= Meitetsu Gamagōri Line =

Railway line in Aichi Prefecture, Japan

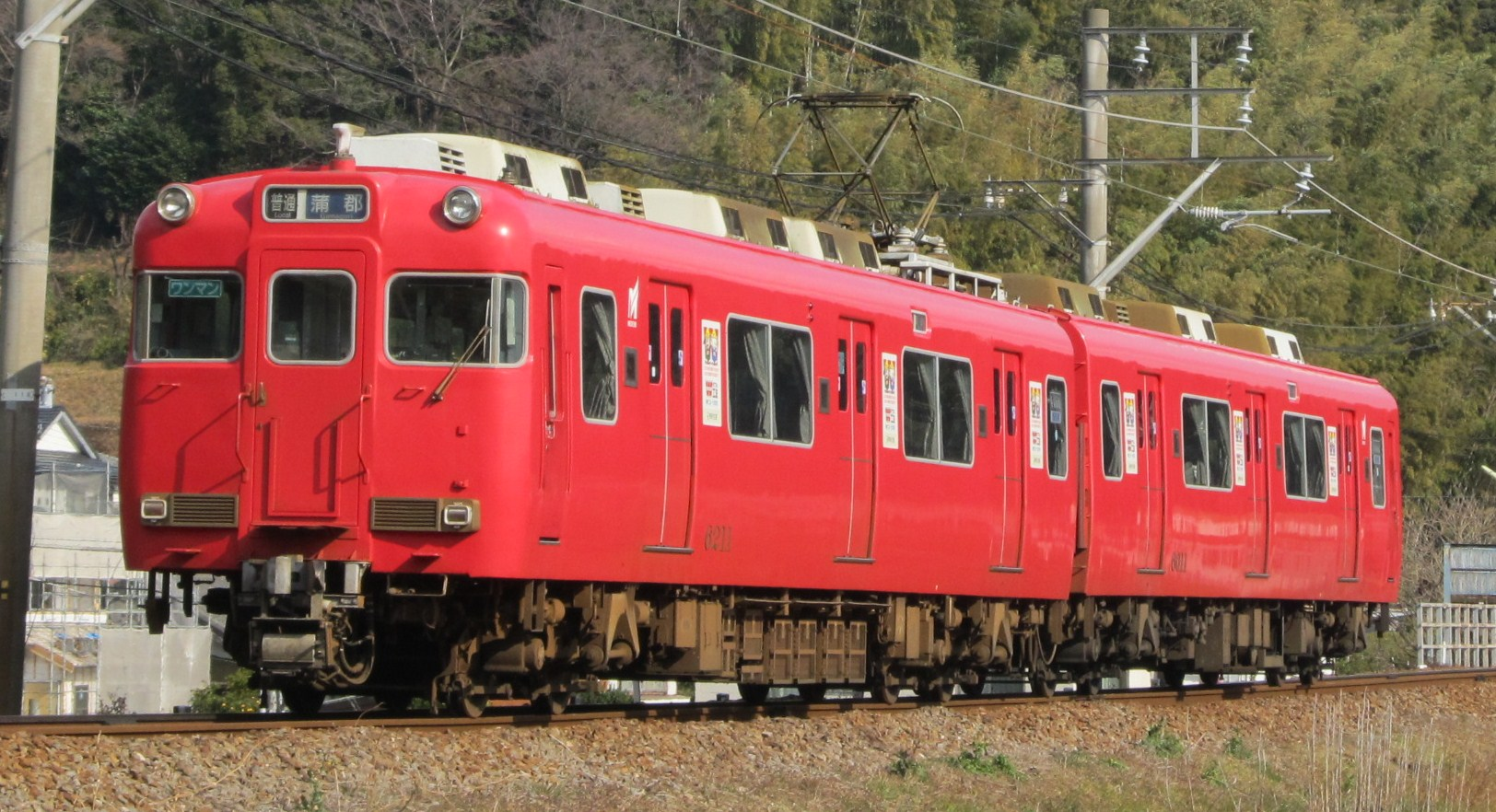
- A Meitetsu 6000 series EMU

Overview
- Native name: 名鉄蒲郡線
- Owner: Meitetsu
- Locale: Nishio; Gamagōri
- Termini: Kira Yoshida; Gamagōri
- Stations: 10

Service
- Type: Commuter rail

History
- Opened: November 10, 1936; 89 years ago

Technical
- Line length: 17.6 km (10.94 mi)
- Track gauge: 1,067 mm (3 ft 6 in)
- Electrification: 1,500 V DC
- Operating speed: 85 km/h (53 mph)

The Meitetsu Gamagōri Line (名鉄蒲郡線, Meitetsu Gamagōri-sen) is a 17.6 km railway line located in Aichi Prefecture, Japan. The line connects Kira Yoshida Station in Nishio, with Gamagōri Station in Gamagōri. It is owned by Nagoya Railroad (Meitetsu) as an extension of the Meitetsu Nishio Line. The fare calculation classification for the line is B, which means the fare is calculated based on the actual distance multiplied by a factor of 1.15.

== History ==
The Kira Yoshida to Mikawa Toba section of the Meitetsu Gamagōri Line was originally opened by the Mikawa Railway in 1929. At that time, it was electrified at 1,500 V DC. In 1936, the line was extended to Gamagōri, although the extension was not electrified. In 1941, the Mikawa Railway merged with Meitetsu, and in 1943, the voltage on the Kira Yoshida to Mikawa Toba section was lowered to 600 V DC to enable through-running with the Meitetsu Nishio Line.

Between 1946 and 1947, the Mikawa Toba to Gamagōri section of the line was electrified. In 1959, the voltage on this section was increased back to 1,500 V DC. As a result, through-running on the Nishio Line resumed when the voltage on that line was raised the following year.

The line does not support IC cards such as manaca. Due to the use of one-person operation the line since June 29, 2008, riders transferring from the Nishio Line must pass through a transfer gate at Kira Yoshida.

=== Viability issues ===
On December 19, 1997, Meitetsu President Muneyoshi Minōra stated during a regularly scheduled press conference Meitetsu's intention to discuss the reorganization and consolidation of unprofitable routes with the relevant local governments and identified the Kira Yoshida-Gamagōri section of the Nishio-Gamagōri Line as a potential candidate for discontinuation, along with the Tanigumi Line and the Yaotsu Line (later discontinued in 2001). Measures to increase efficient operation such as introducing one-person operation and unstaffed stations at select stops were implemented afterwards, but Meitetsu was unable to gain control over the continued reduction in riders. Because of this, on December 20, 2005, Meitetsu established the Meitetsu Nishio and Gamagōri Countermeasures Council along with two cities and towns along the lines.

At the Countermeasures Council, Meitetsu announced the potential closure of two stations on the Gamagōri Line and Nishio Line – Kamaya Station and Mikawa Ogiwara Station – due to the financial challenges of continued operation experienced with the introduction of automatic ticket gates for the new system. They then announced these stations were selected based on the criteria that they received fewer than 300 riders per day and were located outside urban areas. Meitetsu then applied this method of evaluating concrete ridership numbers to the Gamagōri Line with the criteria that the benchmark for considering changing to buses would be less than 4,000 riders per day, meaning the Gamagōri Line at 2,857 riders per day in fiscal 2005 was a strong candidate for cancellation. In reaction, the public authorities along the line stated Meitetsu had a responsibility as a provider of public transportation and requested the line remain. During this same period, Meitetsu was considering implementing a flat fare for the Nishio Line as well as permitting non-disassembled bicycles on board. They went on to trial allowing bicycles on the Nishio Line between March 1 to May 31, 2007, between the Nishio Line's Fukuchi Station and the Gamagōri Line's Gamagōri-Kyōteijō-Mae Station at all stations excluding Kodomonokuni Station.

Ridership dropped to its lowest of 2,927,000 during the 2007 fiscal year. In March 2008, Meitetsu requested Nishio, Kira, Hazu, and Gamagōri cities propose countermeasures for increasing ridership along the Nishio-Kira-Gamagōri section of the Nishio and Gamagōri Lines by the end of the fiscal year. Meitetsu expressed how the lines were unable to display rail's features as a mass transit system due to the extremely low ridership and that they had already exhausted what the company could do alone. They also announced in their 2008 Equipment and Investment Plan that they would not be introducing Tranpass, a magnetic fare card system, between Mikawa Toba Station and Gamagōri Station on the Gamagōri Line despite its rollout on the rest of the company's lines. This section was also not included in the later rollout of manaca, an IC card fare system.

Aichi Prefecture began participating in the Countermeasures Councils starting September 2009 with the 6th Countermeasures Council, and the following arrangements were made at the 8th Countermeasures Council in November 2010:

1. In order to encourage the public to view the Nishio-Gamagōri Line as a foundational aspect of society as important as roads and ensure its continued use, the cities and towns along the line will provide support in the form of a portion of the necessary expenses for Meitetsu for three years (from fiscal 2010 to fiscal 2012).
2. The three parties consisting of the cities and towns along the line, Aichi Prefecture, and Meitetsu will cooperate with local groups, schools, companies, etc. along the line to conduct a variety of awareness-raising activities and maintain the environment around the stations in order to boost use.

As a result, Nishio City and Gamagori City allocated 250 million yen per year, which Aichi Prefecture supplemented by providing 83 million yen annually to the two cities. Discussions were held for the 2013 fiscal year and beyond at the 12th Countermeasures Council in October 2012 which resulted in the two cities on the route continuing to supplement the line's expenses in order to keep the line in operation. Further meetings agreed that the line's continued existence would be maintained by government support up to the 2025 fiscal year.

Revenue generated for the section between Nishio Station and Gamagōri Station in 2017 was 390 million yen, and expenditure for the section was 1.16 billion yen, resulting in a loss of 770 million yen.

== Stations ==
All stations are located in Aichi Prefecture.

No.	Station	Japanese	Distance (km)	Transfers	Location
GN13	Kira Yoshida	吉良吉田	0.0	Meitetsu Nishio Line	Nishio
GN14	Mikawa Toba	三河鳥羽	3.2		Nishio
GN15	Nishi Hazu	西幡豆	4.7		Nishio
GN16	Higashi Hazu	東幡豆	7.0		Nishio
GN17	Kodomonokuni	こどもの国	8.9		Nishio
GN18	Nishiura	西浦	10.5		Gamagōri
GN19	Katahara	形原	11.7		Gamagōri
GN20	Mikawa Kashima	三河鹿島	13.5		Gamagōri
GN21	Gamagōri-Kyōteijō-Mae	蒲郡競艇場前	15.3	Tōkaidō Main Line (Mikawa-Shiotsu)	Gamagōri
GN22	Gamagōri	蒲郡	17.6	Tōkaidō Main Line	Gamagōri
