= Mikawa Toba Station =

Railway station in Nishio, Aichi Prefecture, Japan

Mikawa Toba Station 三河鳥羽駅

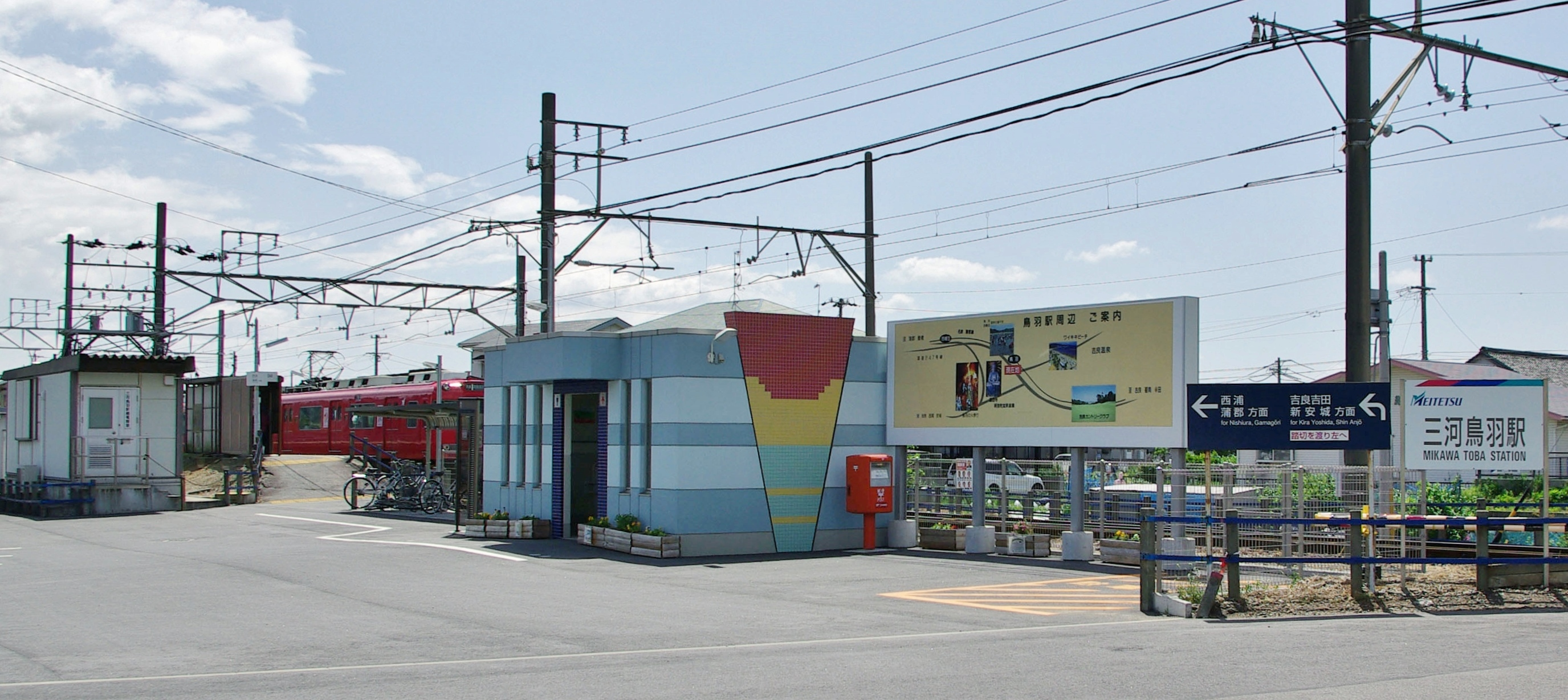
- Mikawa Toba Station in April, 2009

General information
- Location: Koshinden Tobacho, Nishio-shi, Aichi-ken 444-0704; Japan
- Coordinates: 34.7934°N 137.1050°E
- Operator: Meitetsu
- Line: ■ Meitetsu Gamagōri Line
- Distance: 3.2 kilometers from Kira-Yoshida
- Platforms: 2 side platforms

Other information
- Status: Unstaffed
- Station code: GN14
- Website: Official website

History
- Opened: August 11, 1929

Passengers
- FY2017: 161

Services
Preceding station	Meitetsu	Following station
Kira Yoshida Terminus	Gamagōri Line	Nishi Hazu towards Gamagōri
Location
- Location within Aichi Prefecture Location within Japan

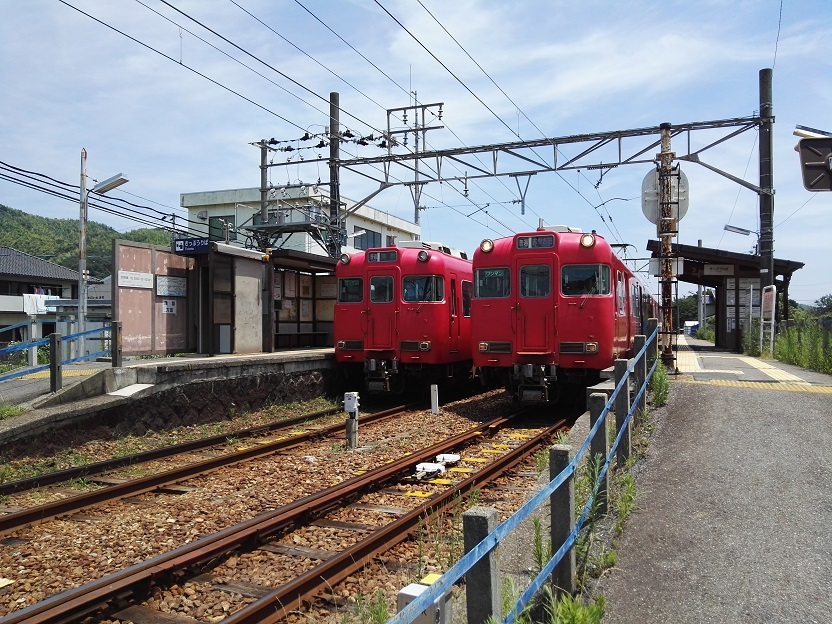
Platform

Mikawa Toba Station (三河鳥羽駅, Mikawa Toba-eki) is a railway station in the city of Nishio, Aichi Prefecture, Japan, operated by Meitetsu.

== Lines ==
Mikawa Toba Station is served by the Meitetsu Gamagōri Line, and is located 3.2 kilometers from the starting point of the line at Kira Yoshida.

== Station layout ==
The station has two opposed unnumbered side platforms connected to the station building by a level crossing. The station has automated ticket machines, Manaca automated turnstiles and is unattended.

=== Platforms ===
South	■ Meitetsu Gamagōri Line	for Kira Yoshida
North	■ Meitetsu Gamagōri Line	for Gamagōri

== Station history ==
Mikawa-Toba Station was opened on August 11, 1929, as a terminal station for the Mikawa Railway. It has been unattended since February 1967.

== Passenger statistics ==
In fiscal 2017, the station was used by an average of 161 passengers daily (boarding passengers only).

== Surrounding area ==
- Japan National Route 247

== See also ==
- List of railway stations in Japan
