= Mikawa Kashima Station =

Railway station in Gamagōri, Aichi Prefecture, Japan

Mikawa Kashima Station 三河鹿島駅

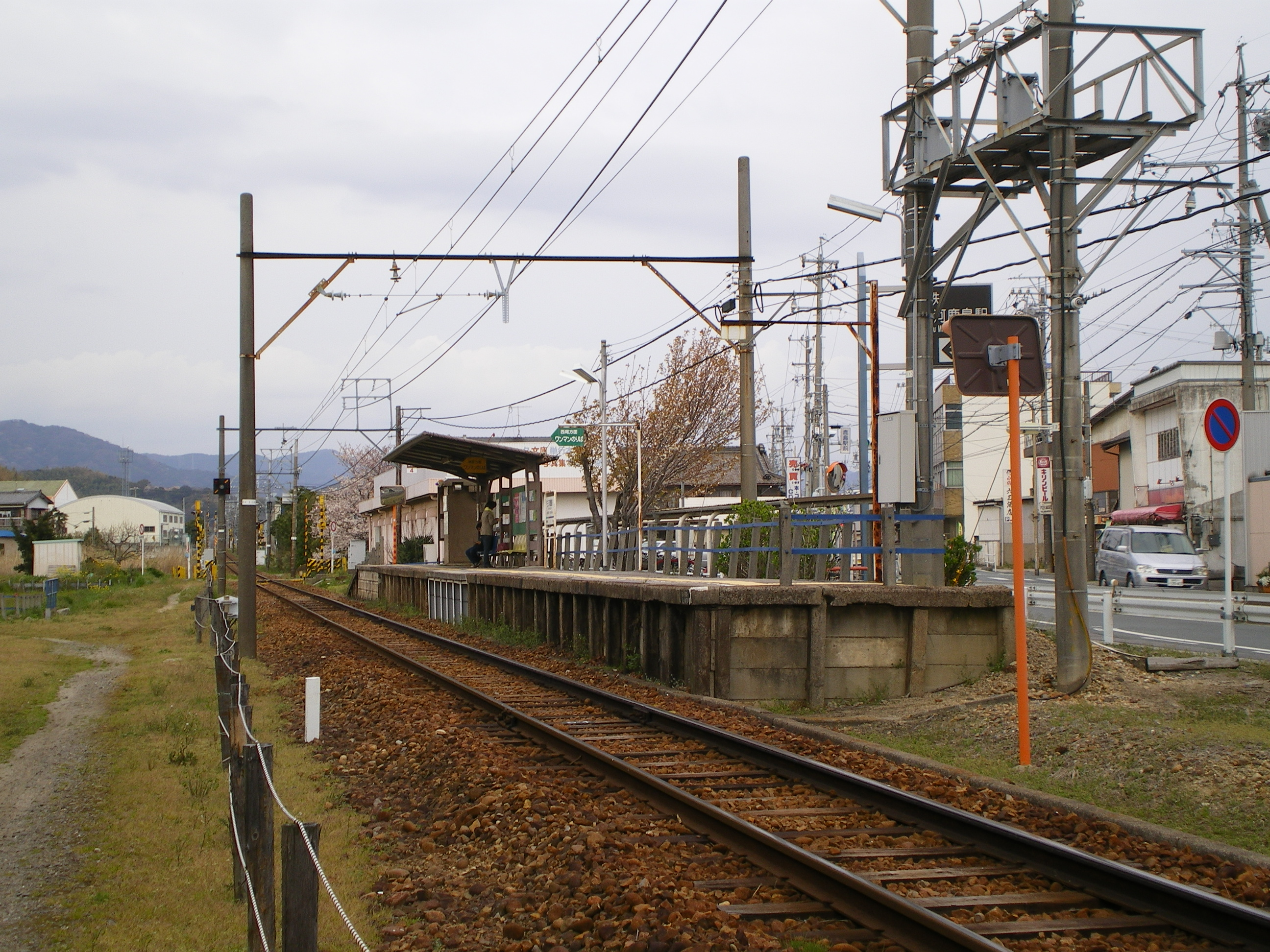
- Mikawa Kashima Station in March 2010

General information
- Location: Yokosuna-39 Kashima-chō, Gamagōri, Aichi-ken 443-0037; Japan
- Coordinates: 34.8134°N 137.1899°E
- Operator: Meitetsu
- Line: ■ Meitetsu Gamagōri Line
- Distance: 13.5 kilometers from Kira-Yoshida
- Platforms: 1 side platform

Other information
- Status: Unstaffed
- Station code: GN20
- Website: Official website

History
- Opened: July 24, 1936

Services
Preceding station	Meitetsu	Following station
Katahara towards Kira Yoshida	Gamagōri Line	Gamagōri-Kyōteijō-Mae towards Gamagōri
Location
- Location within Aichi Prefecture Location within Japan

Mikawa Kashima Station (三河鹿島駅, Mikawa Kashima-eki) is a railway station in the city of Gamagōri, Aichi Prefecture, Japan, operated by Meitetsu.

== Lines ==
Mikawa Kashima Station is served by the Meitetsu Gamagōri Line, and is located 13.5 kilometers from the starting point of the line at Kira-Yoshida.

== Station layout ==
The station has one side platform serving a single bi-directional track. The station is unattended.

== Station history ==
Mikawa Kashima Station was opened on July 24, 1936.

== Surrounding area ==
- Katahara onsen

== See also ==
- List of railway stations in Japan
