= Kodomonokuni Station =

Kodomonokuni Station is the name of three train stations in Japan:

- Kodomonokuni Station (Aichi) (こどもの国駅)
- Kodomonokuni Station (Kanagawa) (こどもの国駅)
- Kodomonokuni Station (Miyazaki) (子供の国駅)
