= Nishi Hazu Station =

Railway station in Nishio, Aichi Prefecture, Japan

Nishi Hazu Station 西幡豆駅

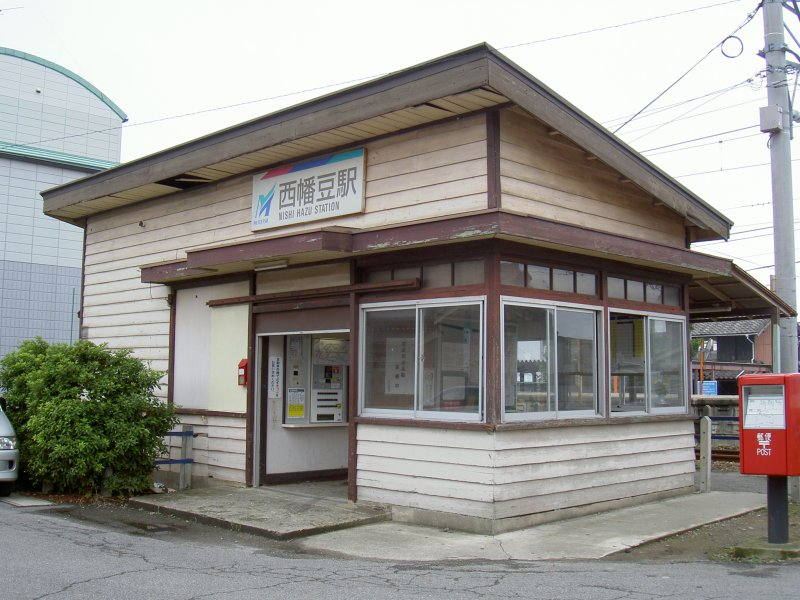
- Nishi Hazu Station in July 2005

General information
- Location: Nakayashiki-16 Nishihazuchō, Nishio-shi, Aichi-ken 444-0703; Japan
- Coordinates: 34.7926°N 137.1215°E
- Operator: Meitetsu
- Line: ■ Meitetsu Gamagōri Line
- Distance: 3.2 kilometers from Kira-Yoshida
- Platforms: 2 side platforms

Other information
- Status: Unstaffed
- Station code: GN15
- Website: Official website

History
- Opened: July 24, 1936

Passengers
- FY2017: 315

Services
| Preceding station | Meitetsu | Following station |
|---|---|---|
| Mikawa Toba towards Kira Yoshida | Gamagōri Line | Higashi Hazu towards Gamagōri |
Location
- Location within Aichi Prefecture Location within Japan

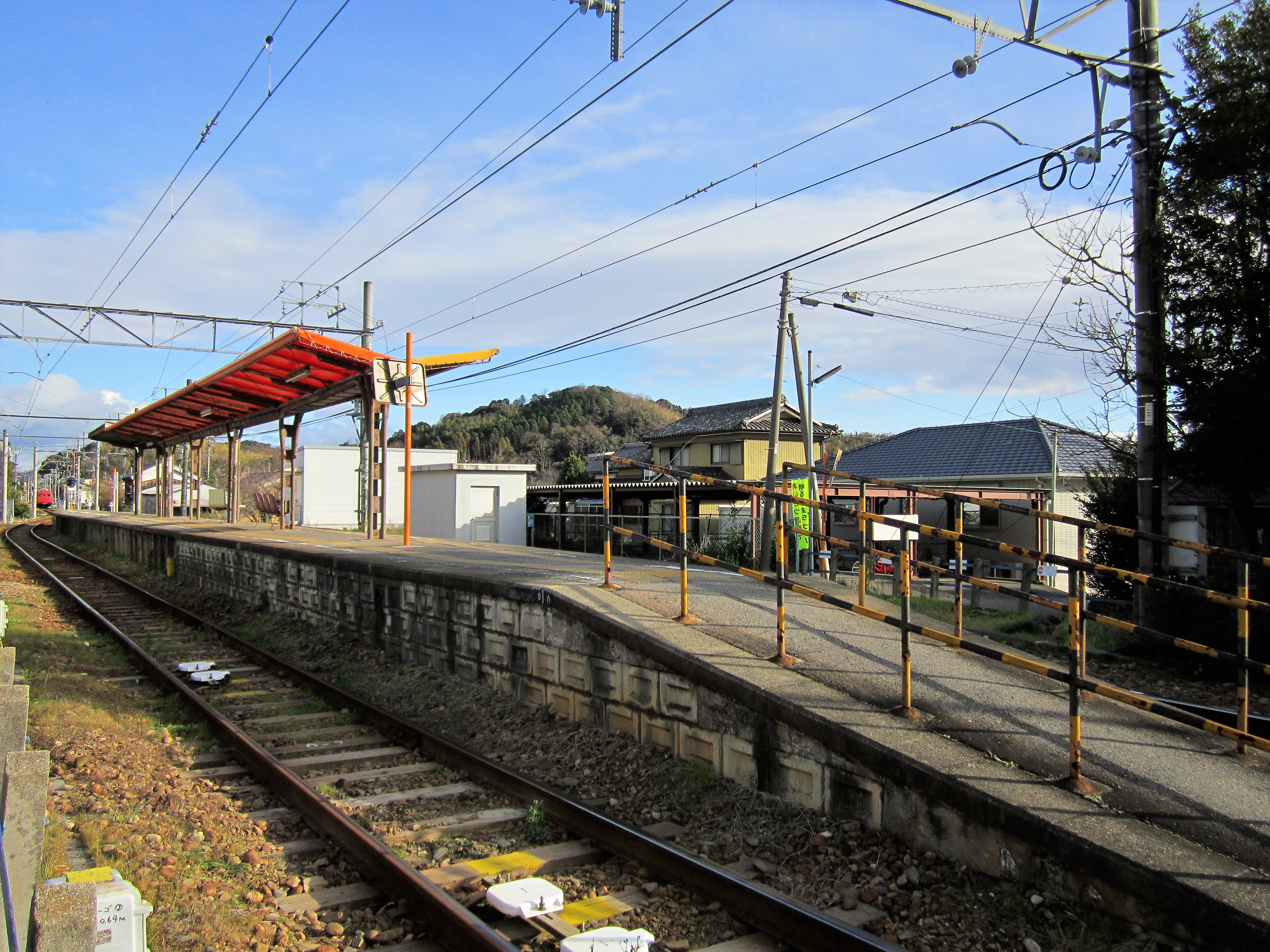
Platform

Nishi Hazu Station (西幡豆駅, Nishi Hazu-eki) is a railway station in the city of Nishio, Aichi Prefecture, Japan, operated by Meitetsu.

== Lines ==
Nishi Hazu Station is served by the Meitetsu Gamagōri Line, and is located 4.7 kilometers from the starting point of the line at Kira Yoshida.

== Station layout ==
The station has a single island platform connected to the station building by a level crossing. The station has automated ticket machines, Manaca automated turnstiles and is unattended.

=== Platforms ===
| South | ■ Meitetsu Gamagōri Line | for Kira Yoshida |
| North | ■ Meitetsu Gamagōri Line | for Gamagōri |

== Station history ==
Nishi Hazu Station was opened on July 24, 1936. It has been unattended since February 1985.

== Passenger statistics ==
In fiscal 2017, the station was used by an average of 315 passengers daily (boarding passengers only).

== Surrounding area ==
- Japan National Route 247
- former Hazu Town Hall

== See also ==
- List of railway stations in Japan
