= Gamagōri-Kyōteijō-Mae Station =

Railway station in Gamagōri, Aichi Prefecture, Japan

Gamagōri-Kyōteijō-Mae Station 蒲郡競艇場前駅

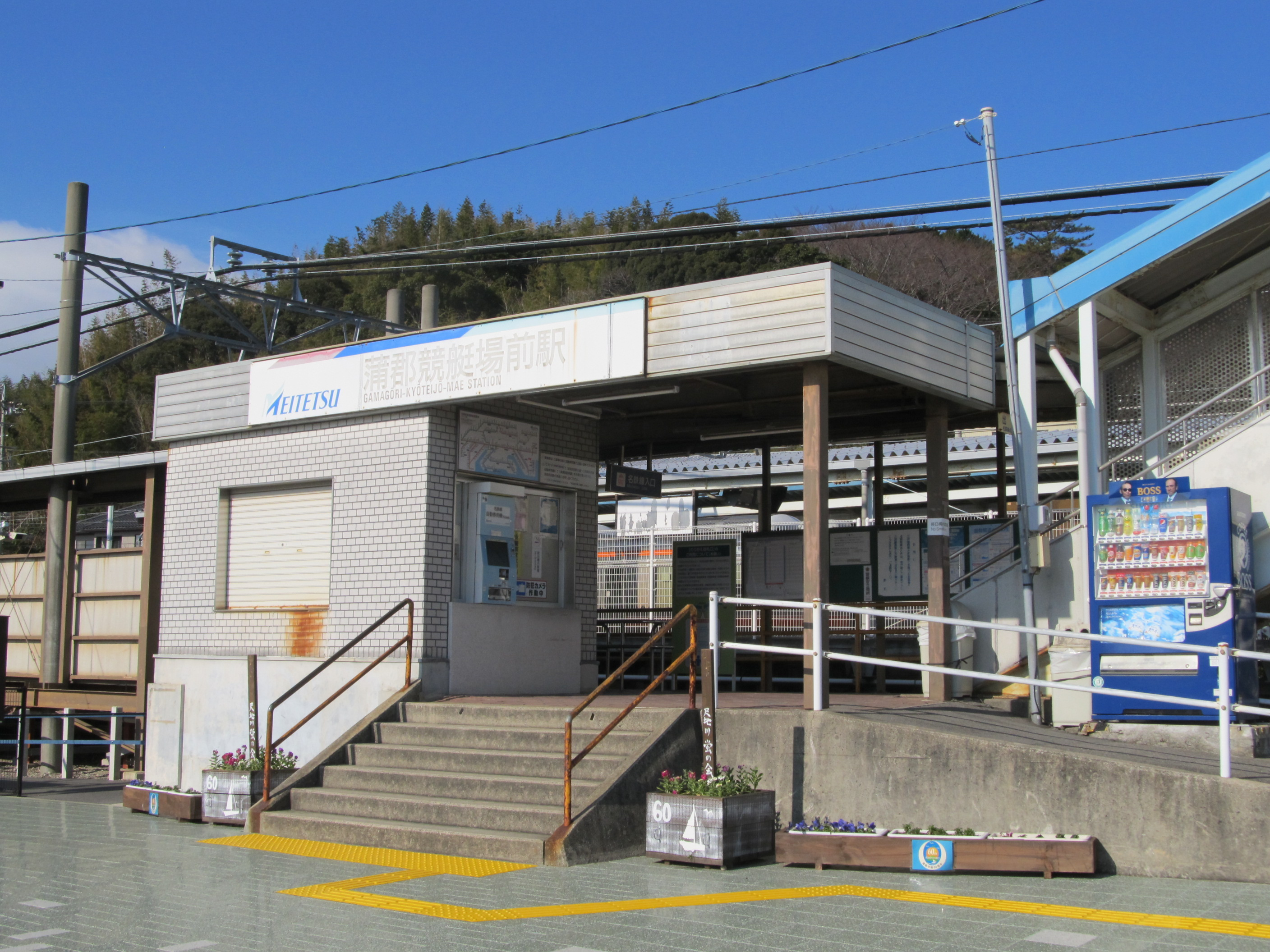
- Gamagōri-Kyōteijō-Mae Station in February 2015

General information
- Location: Yui Takenoya-chō, Gamagōri-shi, Aichi-ken 443-0046; Japan
- Coordinates: 34.8255°N 137.2018°E
- Operator: Meitetsu
- Line: ■ Meitetsu Gamagōri Line
- Distance: 6.6 kilometers from Kira-Yoshida
- Platforms: 1 side platform

Other information
- Status: Staffed
- Station code: GN21
- Website: Official website

History
- Opened: November 10, 1936
- Former names: Hiroishi (until 1968)

Passengers
- 2013: 256 daily

Services
Preceding station	Meitetsu	Following station
Mikawa Kashima towards Kira Yoshida	Gamagōri Line	Gamagōri Terminus
Location
- Location within Aichi Prefecture Location within Japan

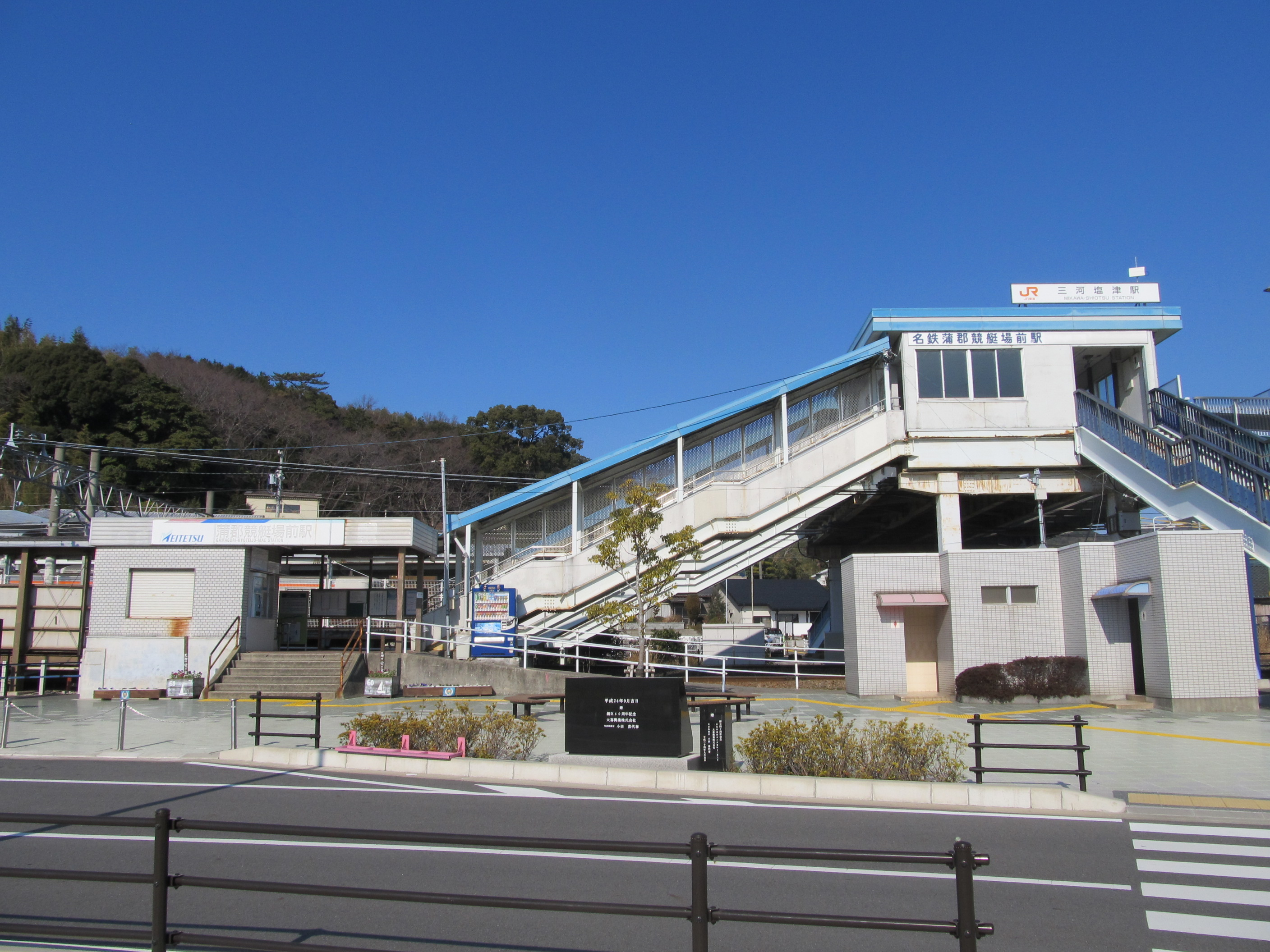
Footbridge

Gamagōri-Kyōteijō-Mae Station (蒲郡競艇場前駅, Gamagōri-kyōteijō-mae-eki) is a railway station in the city of Gamagōri, Aichi Prefecture, Japan, operated by Meitetsu.

== Lines ==
Gamagōri-Kyōteijō-Mae Station is served by the Meitetsu Gamagōri Line, and is located 6.6 kilometers from the starting point of the line at Kira-Yoshida.

== Station layout ==
The station has one side platform connected to a single bi-directional track. The station is staffed. While this station is only operated by Meitetsu, it is physically connected to JR Central Mikawa-Shiotsu Station on the Tōkaidō Main Line by a footbridge.

== Station history ==
Gamagōri-Kyōteijō-Mae Station was opened on November 10, 1936, as Hiroishi Station (拾石駅, Hiroishi-eki) on the Nagoya Railway (the forerunner of present-day Meitetsu). The station was renamed to its present name on October 1, 1968.

== Surrounding area ==
- Aichi University of Technology
- Gamagōri Kyōtei Course, or Gamagōri Boat Race Course.

== See also ==
- List of railway stations in Japan
