= Katahara Station =

Railway station in Gamagōri, Aichi Prefecture, Japan

Katahara Station 形原駅

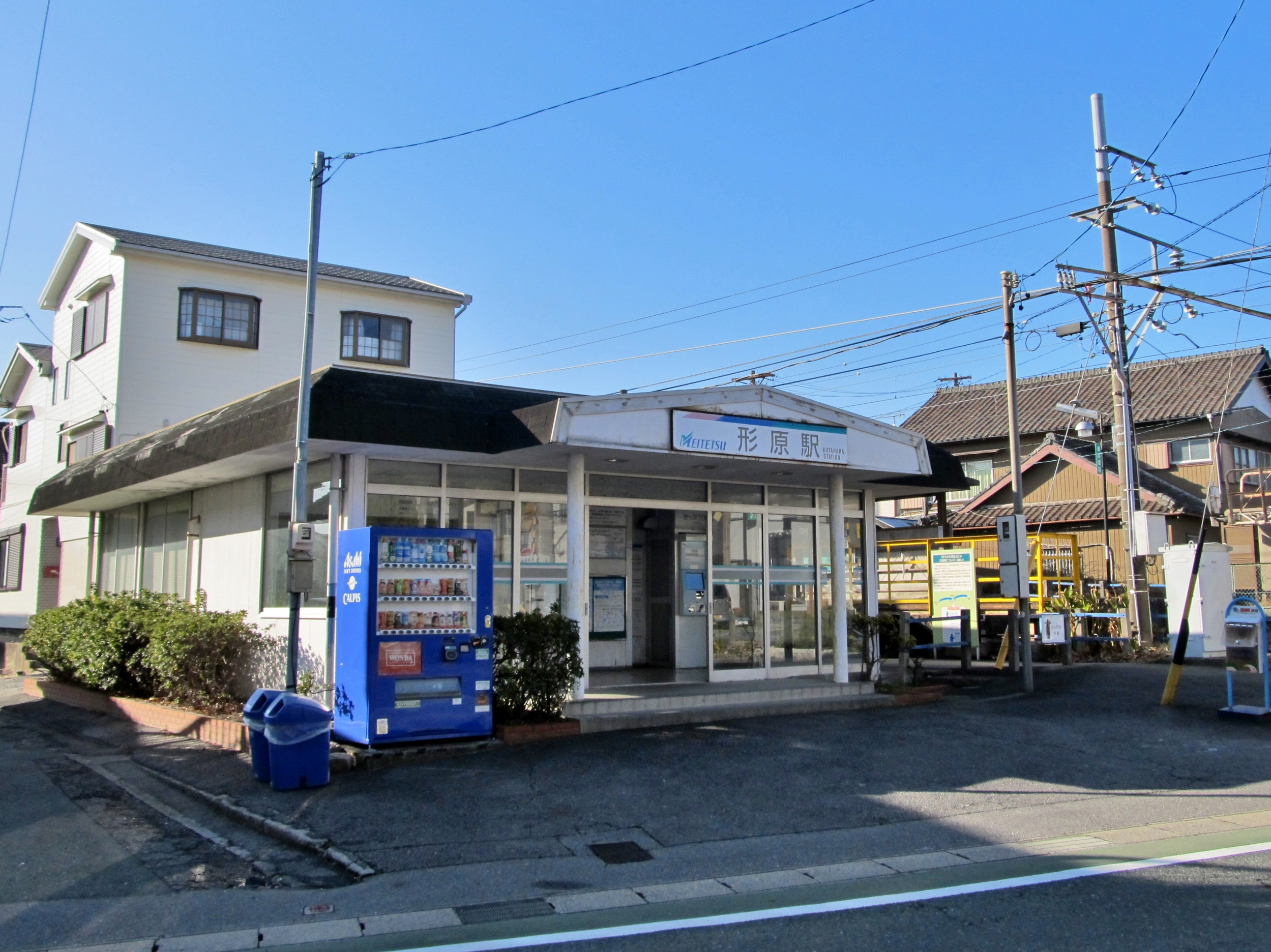
- Katahara Station building in February 2019

General information
- Location: Mitake-62 Kataharachō, Gamagōri-shi, Aichi-ken 443-0104; Japan
- Coordinates: 34.7985°N 137.1847°E
- Operator: Meitetsu
- Line: ■ Meitetsu Gamagōri Line
- Distance: 11.3 kilometers from Kira-Yoshida
- Platforms: 2 side platforms

Other information
- Status: Unstaffed
- Station code: GN19
- Website: Official website

History
- Opened: July 24, 1936

Passengers
- FY2015: 1041

Services
Preceding station	Meitetsu	Following station
Nishiura towards Kira Yoshida	Gamagōri Line	Mikawa Kashima towards Gamagōri
Location
- Location within Aichi Prefecture Location within Japan

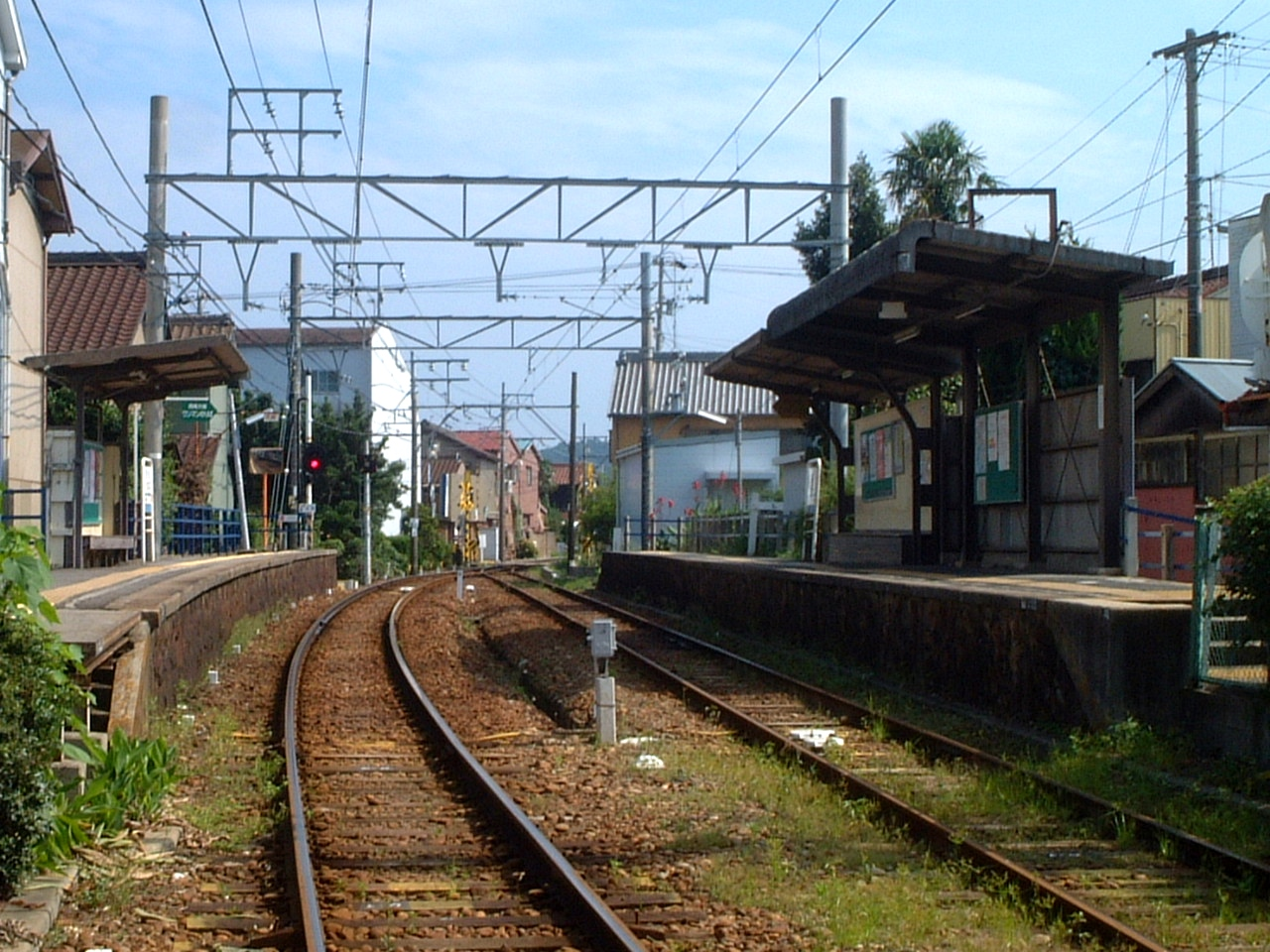
Platform

Katahara Station (形原駅, Katahara-eki) is a railway station in the city of Gamagōri, Aichi Prefecture, Japan, operated by Meitetsu.

== Lines ==
Katahara Station is served by the Meitetsu Gamagōri Line, and is located 11.3 kilometers from the starting point of the line at Kira-Yoshida.

== Station layout ==
The station has two opposed unnumbered side platforms connected to the station building by a level crossing. The station is unattended.

=== Platforms ===
South	■ Meitetsu Gamagōri Line	for Kira Yoshida
North	■ Meitetsu Gamagōri Line	for Gamagōri

== Station history ==
Katahara Station was opened on July 24, 1936. The station building burned down in 1987 and was rebuilt.

== Surrounding area ==
- Katahara onsen
- Gamagohri Baseball Stadium

== See also ==
- List of railway stations in Japan
