= Higashi Hazu Station =

Railway station in Nishio, Aichi Prefecture, Japan

Higashi Hazu Station 東幡豆駅

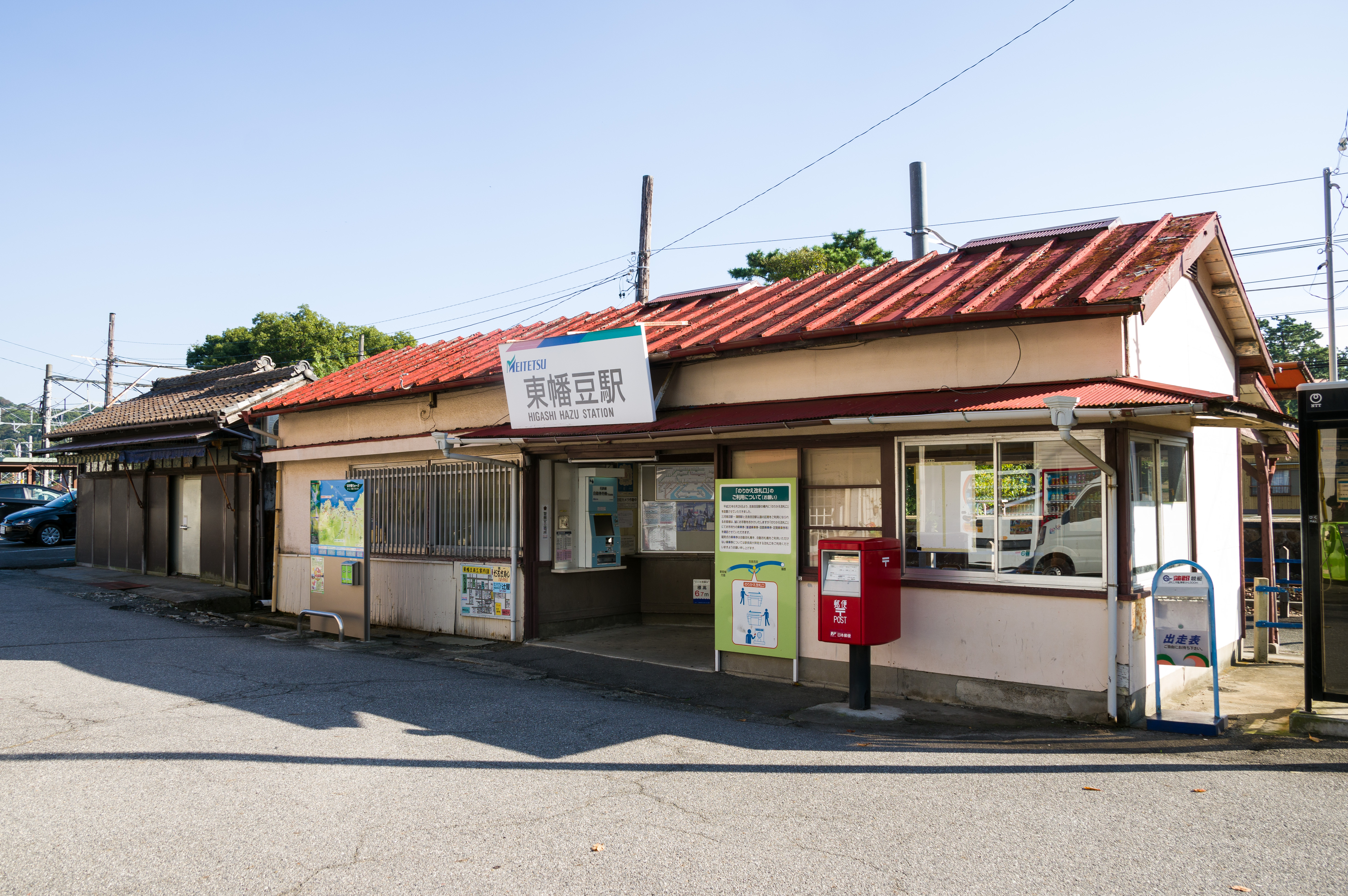
- Higashi Hazu Station in November 2016

General information
- Location: Kokengyoda Hazu, Nishio-shi, Aichi-ken 444-0701; Japan
- Coordinates: 34.7895°N 137.1459°E
- Operator: Meitetsu
- Line: ■ Meitetsu Gamagōri Line
- Distance: 7.0 kilometers from Kira-Yoshida
- Platforms: 1 island platform

Other information
- Status: Unstaffed
- Station code: GN16
- Website: Official website

History
- Opened: July 24, 1936

Passengers
- FY2017: 203

Services
Preceding station	Meitetsu	Following station
Nishi Hazu towards Kira Yoshida	Gamagōri Line	Kodomonokuni towards Gamagōri
Location
- Location within Aichi Prefecture Location within Japan

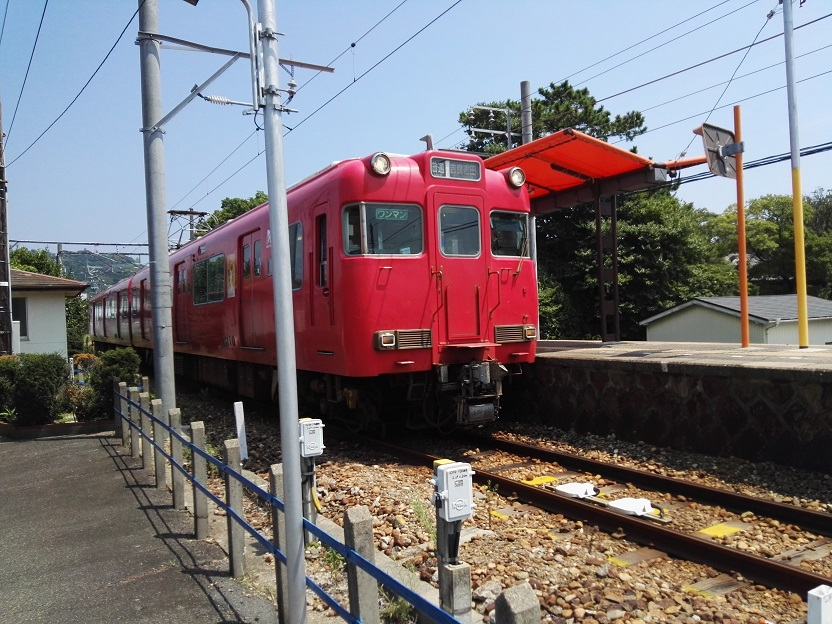
Platform

Higashi Hazu Station (東幡豆駅, Higashi Hazu-eki) is a railway station in the city of Nishio, Aichi Prefecture, Japan, operated by Meitetsu.

== Lines ==
Higashi Hazu Station is served by the Meitetsu Gamagōri Line, and is located 7.0 kilometers from the starting point of the line at Kira Yoshida.

== Station layout ==
The station has a single island platform connected to the station building by a level crossing. The station has automated ticket machines, Manaca automated turnstiles and is unattended.

=== Platforms ===
South	■ Meitetsu Gamagōri Line	for Gamagōri
North	■ Meitetsu Gamagōri Line	for Kira Yoshida

== Station history ==
Higashi Hazu Station was opened on July 24, 1936. It has been unattended since June 1998.

== Passenger statistics ==
In fiscal 2017, the station was used by an average of 203 passengers daily (boarding passengers only).

== Surrounding area ==
- Japan National Route 247

== See also ==
- List of railway stations in Japan
