= Nishiura Station =

Railway station in Gamagōri, Aichi Prefecture, Japan

Nishiura Station 西浦駅

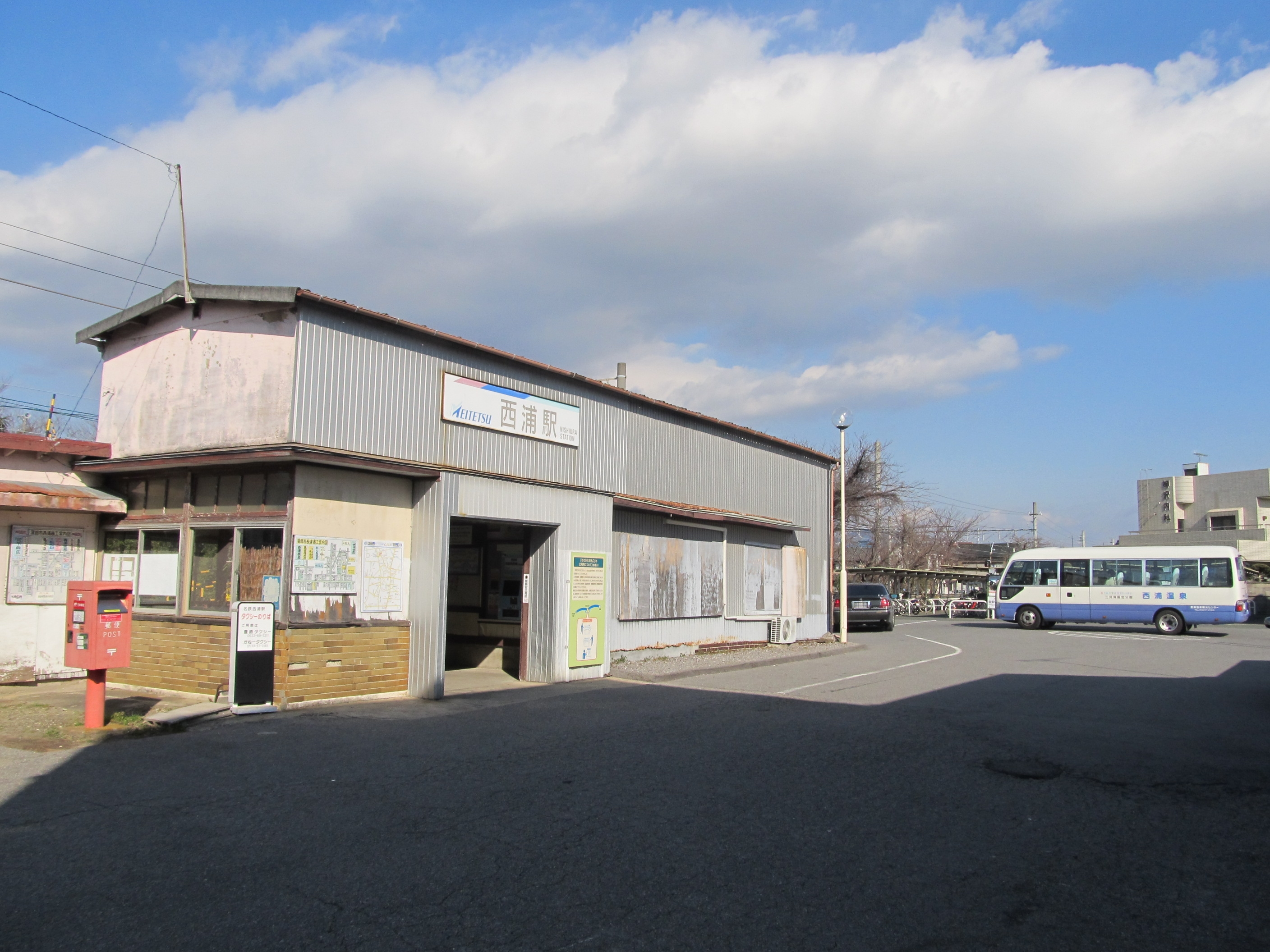
- Station Building

General information
- Location: Baba-48-1 Nishiurachō, Gamagōri-shi, Aichi-ken 443-0105; Japan
- Coordinates: 34.7900°N 137.1785°E
- Operator: Meitetsu
- Line: ■ Meitetsu Gamagōri Line
- Distance: 10.5 kilometers from Kira-Yoshida
- Platforms: 1 island platform

Other information
- Status: Unstaffed
- Station code: GN18
- Website: Official website

History
- Opened: July 24, 1936

Services
Preceding station	Meitetsu	Following station
Kodomonokuni towards Kira Yoshida	Gamagōri Line	Katahara towards Gamagōri
Location
- Location within Aichi Prefecture Location within Japan

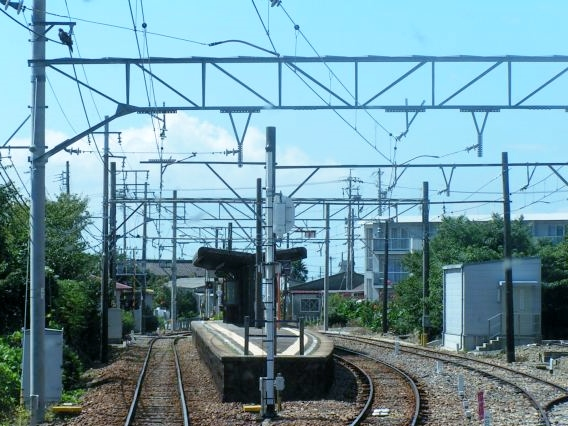
Platform

Nishiura Station (西浦駅, Nishiura-eki) is a railway station in the city of Gamagōri, Aichi Prefecture, Japan, operated by Meitetsu.

== Lines ==
Nishiura Station is served by the Meitetsu Gamagōri Line, and is located 10.5 kilometers from the starting point of the line at Kira-Yoshida.

== Station layout ==
The station has a single island platform connected to the station building by a level crossing. The station is unattended.

=== Platforms ===
1	■ Meitetsu Gamagōri Line	for Kira Yoshida
2	■ Meitetsu Gamagōri Line	for Gamagōri

== Station history ==
Nishiura Station was opened on July 24, 1936. The station has been unattended since June 1999.

== Surrounding area ==
- Nishiura onsen

== See also ==
- List of railway stations in Japan
