= Kodomonokuni Station (Aichi) =

Railway station in Nishio, Aichi Prefecture, Japan

Kodomonokuni Station こどもの国駅

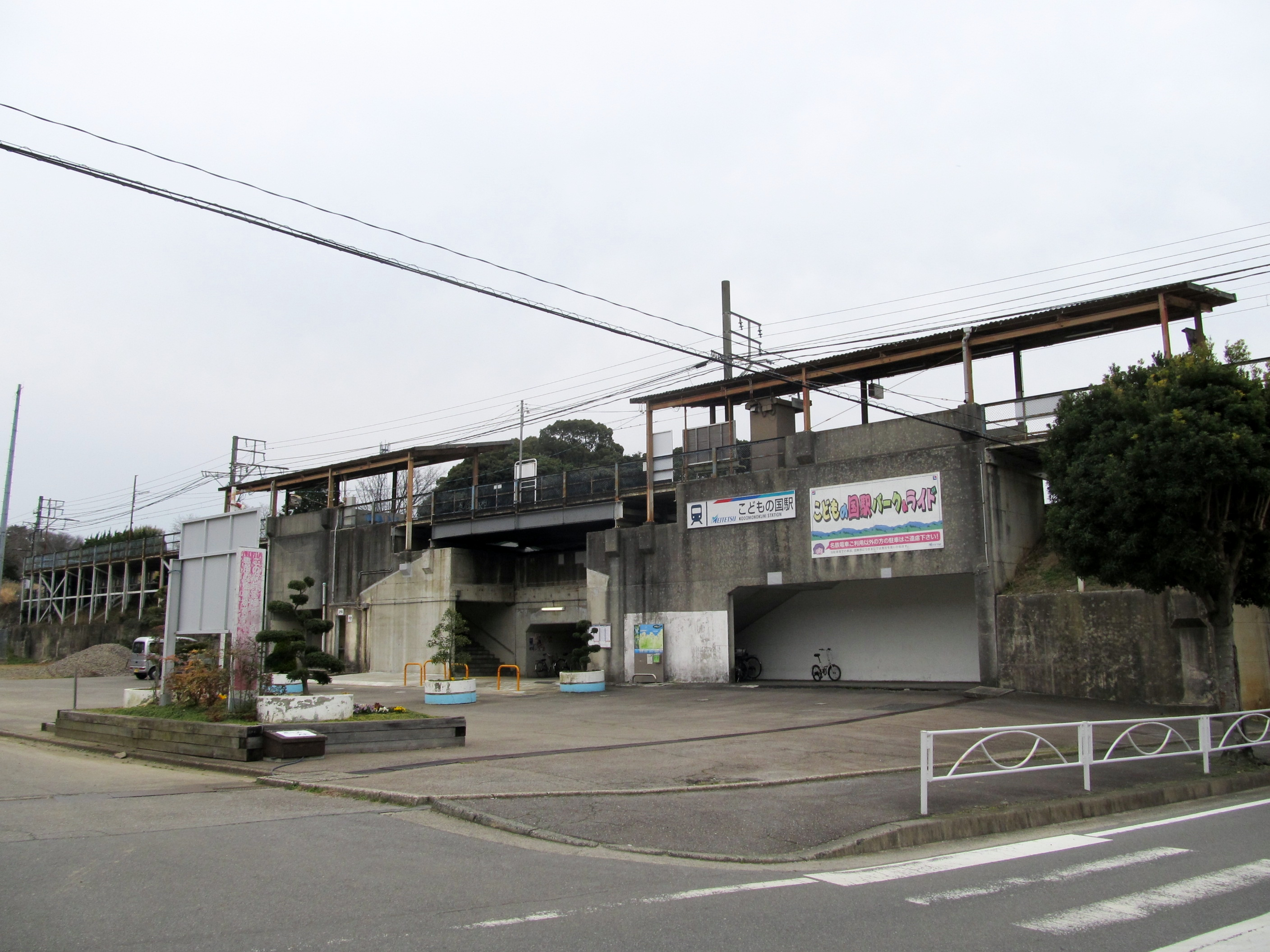
- Kodomonokuni Station in March 2007

General information
- Location: Midomae Hazu, Nishio-shi, Aichi-ken 444-0701; Japan
- Coordinates: 34.7887°N 137.163°E
- Operator: Meitetsu
- Line: ■ Meitetsu Gamagōri Line
- Distance: 8.9 kilometers from Kira-Yoshida
- Platforms: 1 side platform

Other information
- Status: Unstaffed
- Station code: GN17
- Website: Official website

History
- Opened: July 24, 1936
- Former names: Susaki (until 1976)

Passengers
- FY2017: 77

Services
Preceding station	Meitetsu	Following station
Higashi Hazu towards Kira Yoshida	Gamagōri Line	Nishiura towards Gamagōri
Location
- Location within Aichi Prefecture Location within Japan

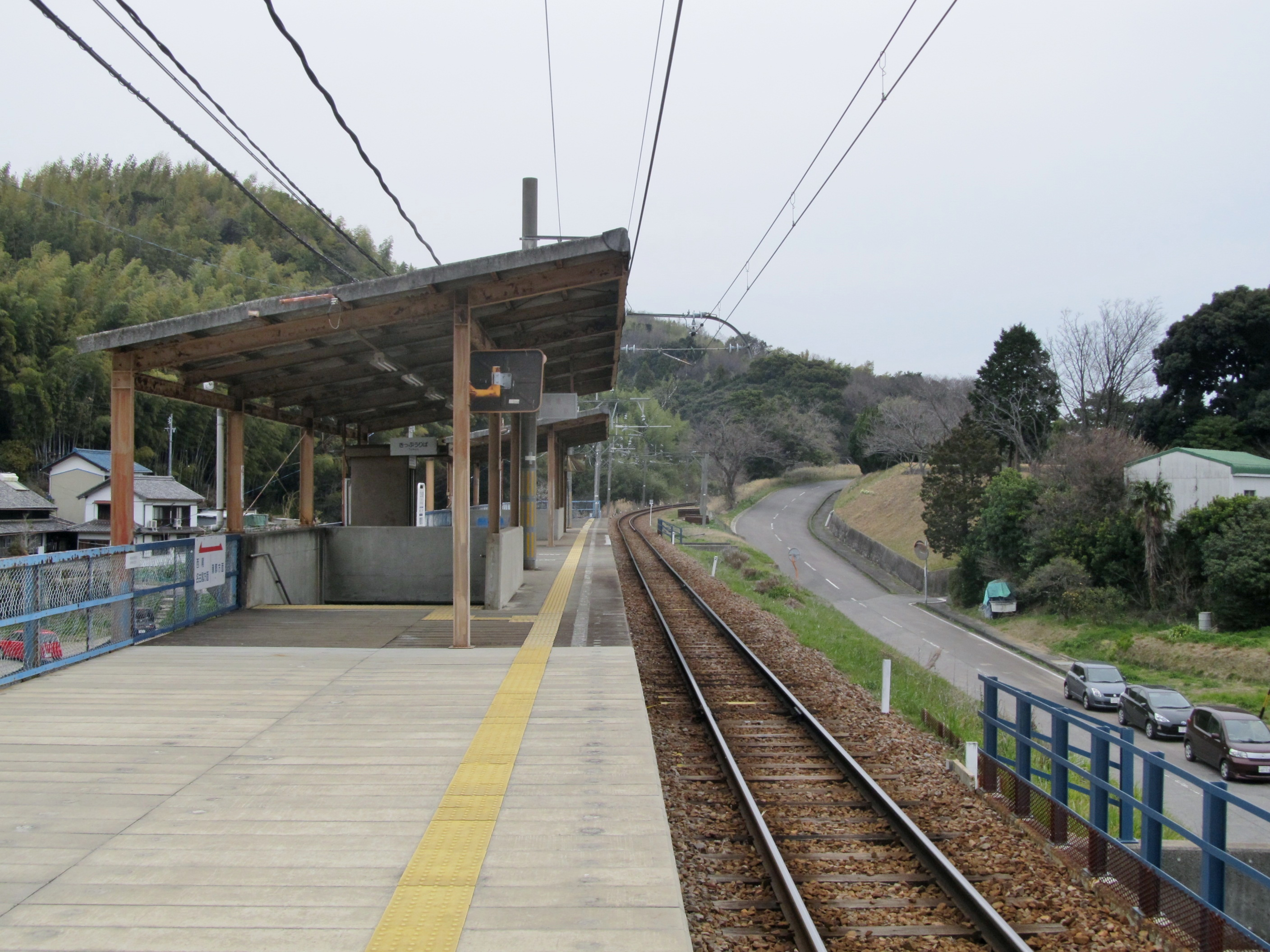
Platform

Kodomonokuni Station (こどもの国駅, Kodomonokuni-eki) is a railway station in the city of Nishio, Aichi Prefecture, Japan, operated by Meitetsu. It serves the Aichi Kodomonokuni theme park.

== Lines ==
Kodomonokuni Station is served by the Meitetsu Gamagōri Line, and is located 8.9 kilometers from the starting point of the line at Kira Yoshida.

== Station layout ==
The station has a single side platform serving one bidirectional track. The station has automated ticket machines, Manaca automated turnstiles and is unattended.

== Station history ==
Kodomonokuni Station was opened on July 24, 1936, as Susaki Station (洲崎駅, Susaki-eki). The station was closed in 1944 due to World War II, and reopened on October 1, 1952, at a new location to the west of the original station. It was relocated again in October 1974 and renamed to its present name on October 10, 1976. It has been unattended since 1952.

== Passenger statistics ==
In fiscal 2017, the station was used by an average of 77 passengers daily (boarding passengers only).

== Surrounding area ==
- Aichi Kodomonokuni Amusement Park.

== See also ==
- List of railway stations in Japan
