= Gamagōri =

Gamagōri 蒲郡市
- City
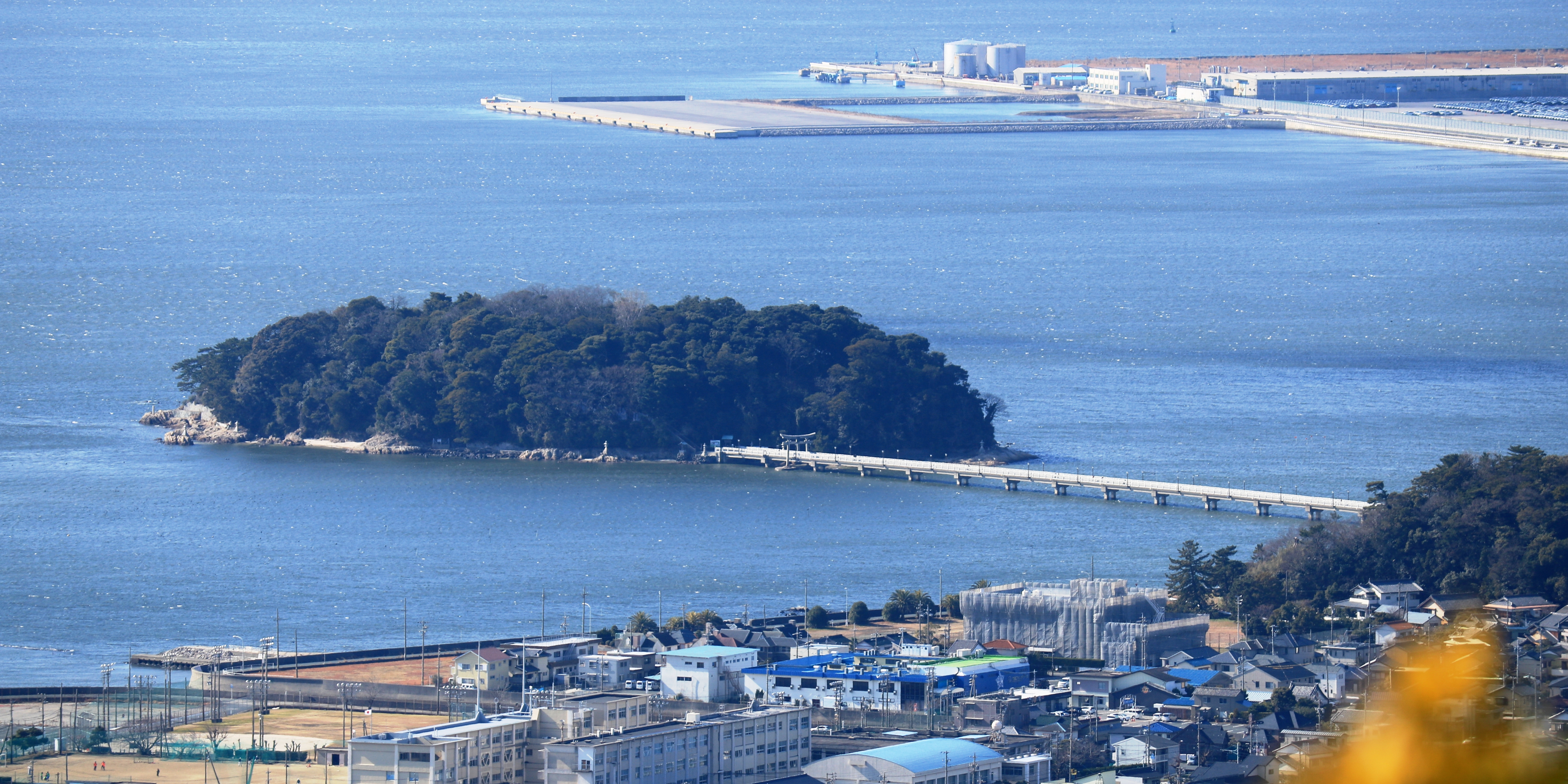
- View of Takeshima Island and part of the city

- Flag Seal
- Interactive map of Gamagōri
- Coordinates: 34°50′35″N 137°13′10.5″E
- Country: Japan
- Region: Chūbu (Tōkai)
- Prefecture: Aichi

Government
  - Mayor: Hisaaki Suzuki

Area
  - Total: 56.92 km^{2} (21.98 sq mi)

Population (October 1, 2019)
  - Total: 80,063
  - Density: 1,407/km^{2} (3,643/sq mi)
- Time zone: UTC+9 (Japan Standard Time)
- Phone number: 0533-66-1111
- Address: 17-1 Asahi-chō, Gamagōri-shi, Aichi-ken 443-8601
- Climate: Cfa
- Website: Official website
- Symbols
- Flower: Azalea
- Tree: Camphor laurel

Gamagōri (蒲郡市, Gamagōri-shi) is a city in Aichi Prefecture, Japan. As of 1 October 2019, the city had an estimated population of 80,063 in 32,800 households, and a population density of 1,407 persons per km^{2}. The total area of the city is 56.92 square kilometres (21.98 sq mi).

== Geography ==
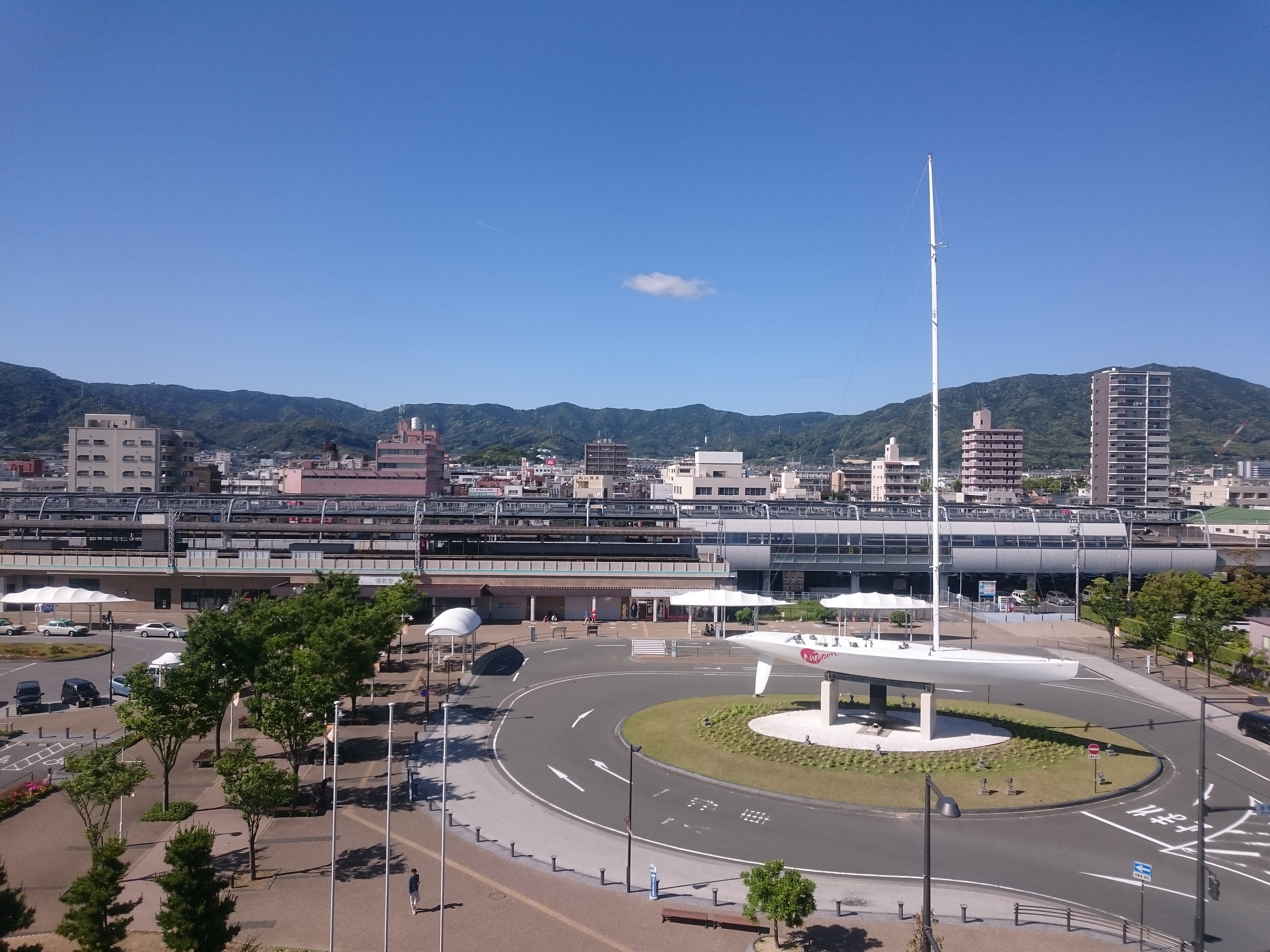
Gamagōri Skyline

Gamagōri is situated on the coast of Mikawa Bay on the Pacific Ocean in southeastern Aichi Prefecture. Sheltered by Chita Peninsula and Atsumi Peninsula, the climate is mild, and parts of the city is within the borders of the Mikawa Wan Quasi-National Park.

=== Climate ===
The city has a climate characterized by hot and humid summers, and relatively mild winters (Köppen climate classification Cfa). The average annual temperature in Gamagōri is 16.3 °C (61.3 °F). The average annual rainfall is 1,631.2 mm (64.22 in) with September as the wettest month. The temperatures are highest on average in August, at around 27.4 °C (81.3 °F), and lowest in January, at around 5.6 °C (42.1 °F).

Climate data for Gamagōri (1991−2020 normals, extremes 1979−present)
| Month | Jan | Feb | Mar | Apr | May | Jun | Jul | Aug | Sep | Oct | Nov | Dec | Year |
|---|---|---|---|---|---|---|---|---|---|---|---|---|---|
| Record high °C (°F) | 18.4 (65.1) | 21.4 (70.5) | 24.8 (76.6) | 29.7 (85.5) | 32.8 (91.0) | 35.4 (95.7) | 38.7 (101.7) | 38.7 (101.7) | 37.2 (99.0) | 32.2 (90.0) | 25.3 (77.5) | 23.0 (73.4) | 38.7 (101.7) |
| Mean daily maximum °C (°F) | 9.9 (49.8) | 10.9 (51.6) | 14.4 (57.9) | 19.5 (67.1) | 23.9 (75.0) | 26.6 (79.9) | 30.5 (86.9) | 32.3 (90.1) | 28.8 (83.8) | 23.4 (74.1) | 17.9 (64.2) | 12.4 (54.3) | 20.9 (69.6) |
| Daily mean °C (°F) | 5.6 (42.1) | 6.2 (43.2) | 9.4 (48.9) | 14.5 (58.1) | 18.9 (66.0) | 22.2 (72.0) | 26.1 (79.0) | 27.4 (81.3) | 24.2 (75.6) | 18.9 (66.0) | 13.4 (56.1) | 8.1 (46.6) | 16.2 (61.2) |
| Mean daily minimum °C (°F) | 1.9 (35.4) | 2.1 (35.8) | 5.0 (41.0) | 10.1 (50.2) | 14.9 (58.8) | 18.8 (65.8) | 22.9 (73.2) | 24.0 (75.2) | 20.8 (69.4) | 15.3 (59.5) | 9.6 (49.3) | 4.4 (39.9) | 12.5 (54.5) |
| Record low °C (°F) | −5.5 (22.1) | −6.0 (21.2) | −1.8 (28.8) | 1.1 (34.0) | 6.0 (42.8) | 12.8 (55.0) | 16.5 (61.7) | 17.9 (64.2) | 12.5 (54.5) | 6.1 (43.0) | 1.2 (34.2) | −2.7 (27.1) | −6.0 (21.2) |
| Average precipitation mm (inches) | 58.8 (2.31) | 67.0 (2.64) | 128.1 (5.04) | 139.3 (5.48) | 160.9 (6.33) | 193.3 (7.61) | 193.6 (7.62) | 124.5 (4.90) | 230.7 (9.08) | 187.6 (7.39) | 90.0 (3.54) | 57.4 (2.26) | 1,631.2 (64.22) |
| Average precipitation days (≥ 1.0 mm) | 5.7 | 6.3 | 9.4 | 9.6 | 9.9 | 12.0 | 11.0 | 7.4 | 10.7 | 10.2 | 6.5 | 6.2 | 104.9 |
| Mean monthly sunshine hours | 181.0 | 175.8 | 201.3 | 204.7 | 212.7 | 152.3 | 181.8 | 223.2 | 168.4 | 169.4 | 168.0 | 179.8 | 2,218.5 |
Source: Japan Meteorological Agency

=== Demographics ===
Per Japanese census data, the population of Gamagōri has been relatively steady over the past 30 years.

Historical population
| Year | Pop. | ±% |
|---|---|---|
| 1950 | 63,923 | — |
| 1960 | 75,723 | +18.5% |
| 1970 | 82,868 | +9.4% |
| 1980 | 85,295 | +2.9% |
| 1990 | 84,819 | −0.6% |
| 2000 | 82,108 | −3.2% |
| 2010 | 82,222 | +0.1% |

=== Neighboring municipalities ===
Aichi Prefecture

- Kōta
- Nishio
- Okazaki
- Toyokawa

== History ==
=== Ancient history ===
Records of place names in present-day Gamagōri have been found from the Nara period.

The area was divided into several shōen during the Heian period, largely under the control of the Udono clan.

=== Early modern period ===
During the Edo period, most of the area was tenryō territory ruled directly by the Tokugawa shogunate through hatamoto administrators, with portions controlled by Yoshida Domain and Okazaki Domain.

=== Late modern period ===
After the start of the Meiji period, Gamagōri Village in Hoi District, Aichi Prefecture was proclaimed on October 1, 1889. Gamagōri was elevated to town status on October 6, 1891.

The area of the town expanded through annexation of the neighboring villages of Toyooka, Kaminogo and Shizusato on July 4, 1906.

The town escaped damage in World War II, but the 1945 Mikawa earthquake caused considerable damage to parts of Gamagōri.

=== Contemporary history ===
The city of Gamagōri was proclaimed on April 1, 1954, when the town of Gamagōri merged with the neighboring town of Miya and village of Shiotsu.

The village of Otsuka joined Gamagōri on October 1, 1956, followed by Katahara on April 1, 1962, and Nishiura on April 1, 1963.

== Government ==
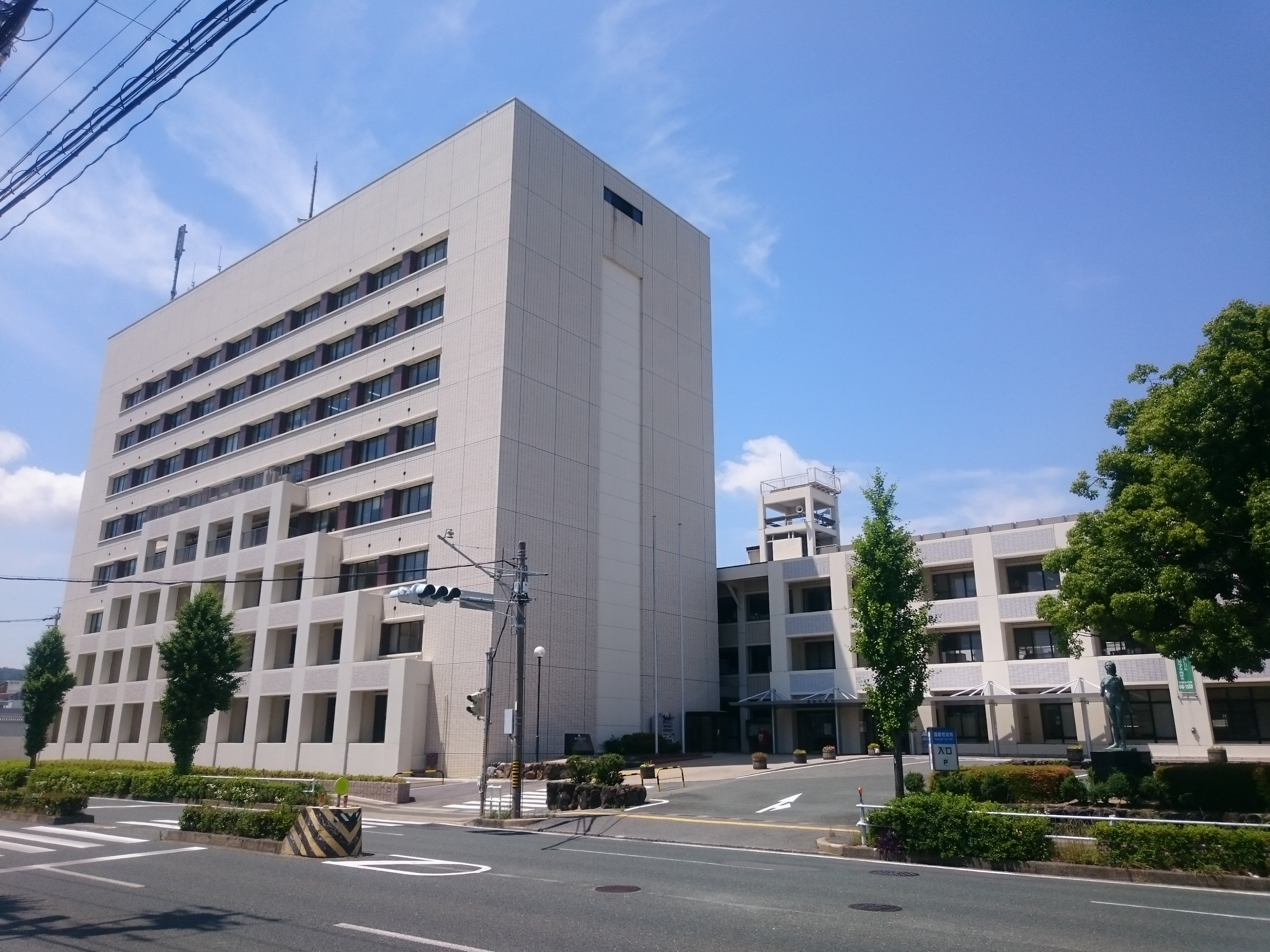
Gamagōri City Office

Gamagōri has a mayor-council form of government with a directly elected mayor and a unicameral city legislature of 20 members. The city contributes one member to the Aichi Prefectural Assembly. In terms of national politics, the city is part of Aichi District 14 of the lower house of the Diet of Japan.

== Economy ==
Gamagōri is a regional commercial center and fishing port, with a mixed economy of light manufacturing and agriculture. Gamagōri is also noted for its production of hothouse oranges. Companies headquartered in the city include:

- Nidek Co., Ltd., optics
- Japan Tissue Engineering Co., Ltd., bio-pharmaceuticals
- Takemoto Oil & Fat Co. Ltd., edible oils
- Gamasa Food Co. Ltd., food processing
- Nippon Tokushu Goukin Co., Ltd., metal fittings and components

== Education ==
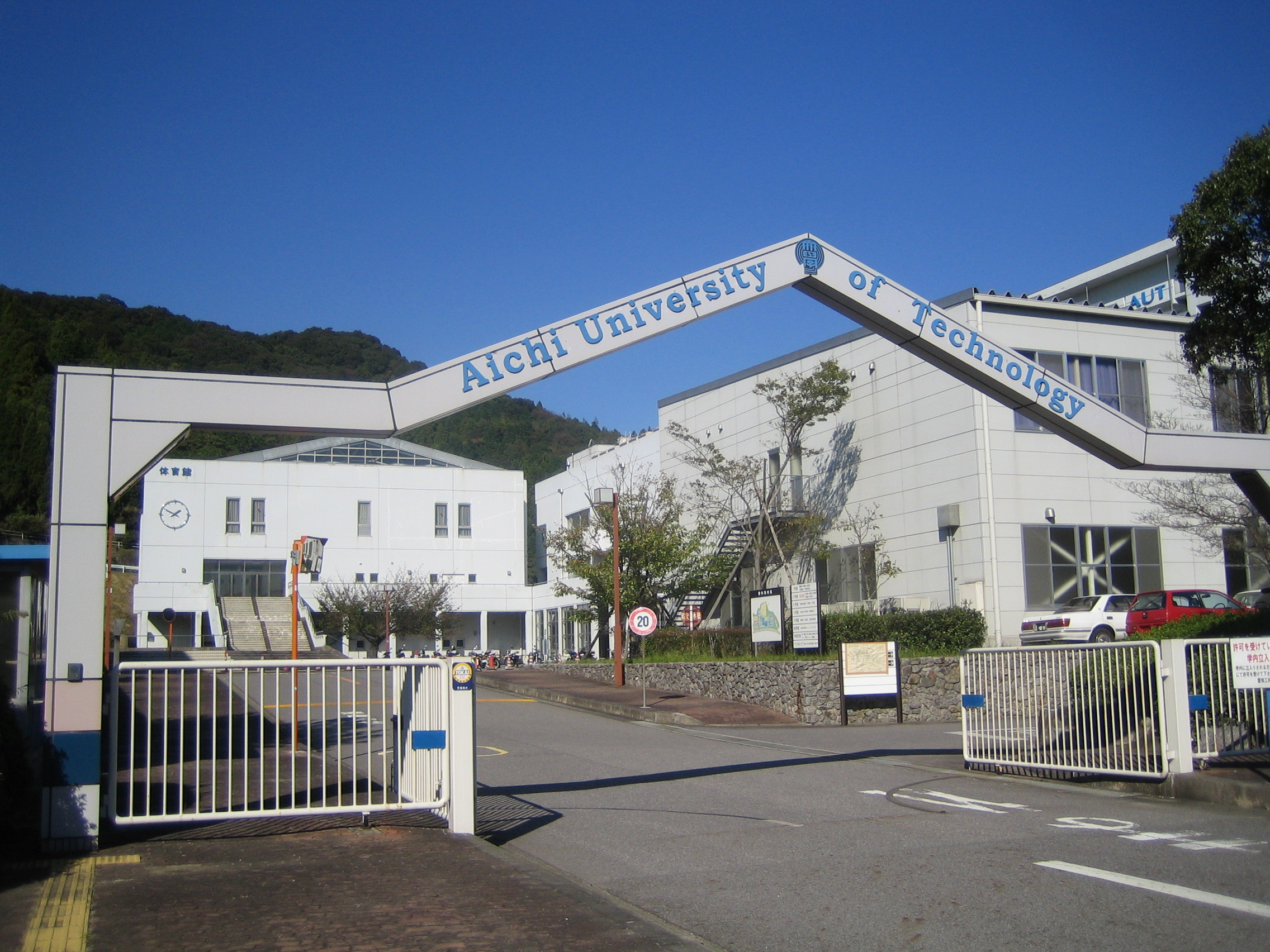
Aichi University of Technology

=== University ===
- Aichi University of Technology

=== Junior college ===
- Aichi University of Technology Automotive Junior College

=== Schools ===
- Gamagōri has 13 public elementary schools and seven public middle schools operated by the city government and two public high schools operated by the Aichi Prefectural Board of Education. There is also one private high school.

== Transportation ==
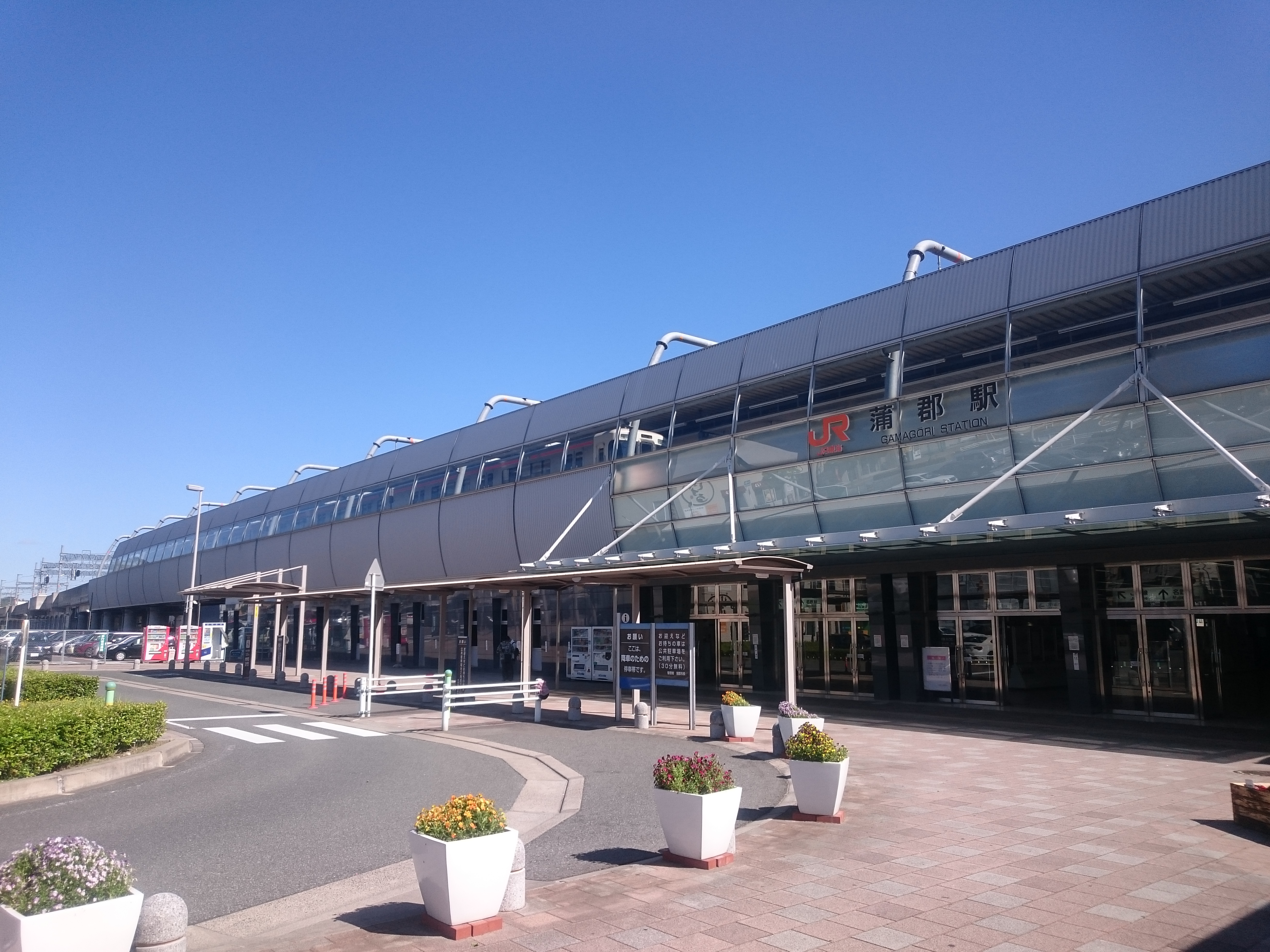
Gamagori Station

=== Railways ===
==== Conventional lines ====
Central Japan Railway Company

- Tōkaidō Main Line: - Mikawa-Ōtsuka - Mikawa-Miya - Gamagōri - Mikawa-Shiotsu -

Meitetsu

- Meitetsu Gamagōri Line: - Nishiura - Katahara - Mikawa-Kashima - Gamagōri-Kyōteijō-Mae - Gamagōri

=== Roads ===
==== Expressways ====
- Tōmei Expressway

==== Japan National Route ====
- National Route 23
- National Route 247
- National Route 248
- National Route 473

== Sister cities ==
- (Japan) Urasoe, Okinawa Prefecture, since November 4, 1981
- Gisborne, New Zealand, sister port since July 27, 1996

== Local attractions ==
As part of Mikawa Wan Quasi-National Park with numerous scenic offshore islands, Gamagōri is noted for marine sports. There are also several hot spring resorts within the city limits. The Gamagōri Matsuri, held in late July features a fireworks display, and the local festival of former Miya village held in October features an event where mikoshi are carried into the sea. The city is also home to the Lagunasia amusement park and Spa Nishiura Motor Park racetrack.

The small fishing community of Nishiura is noted for its onsen (hot spring resorts), some of which are located near its beach front. The area is famous for the medicinal properties of its water and a number of hotels have sprung up to accommodate the tourists visiting these spas.

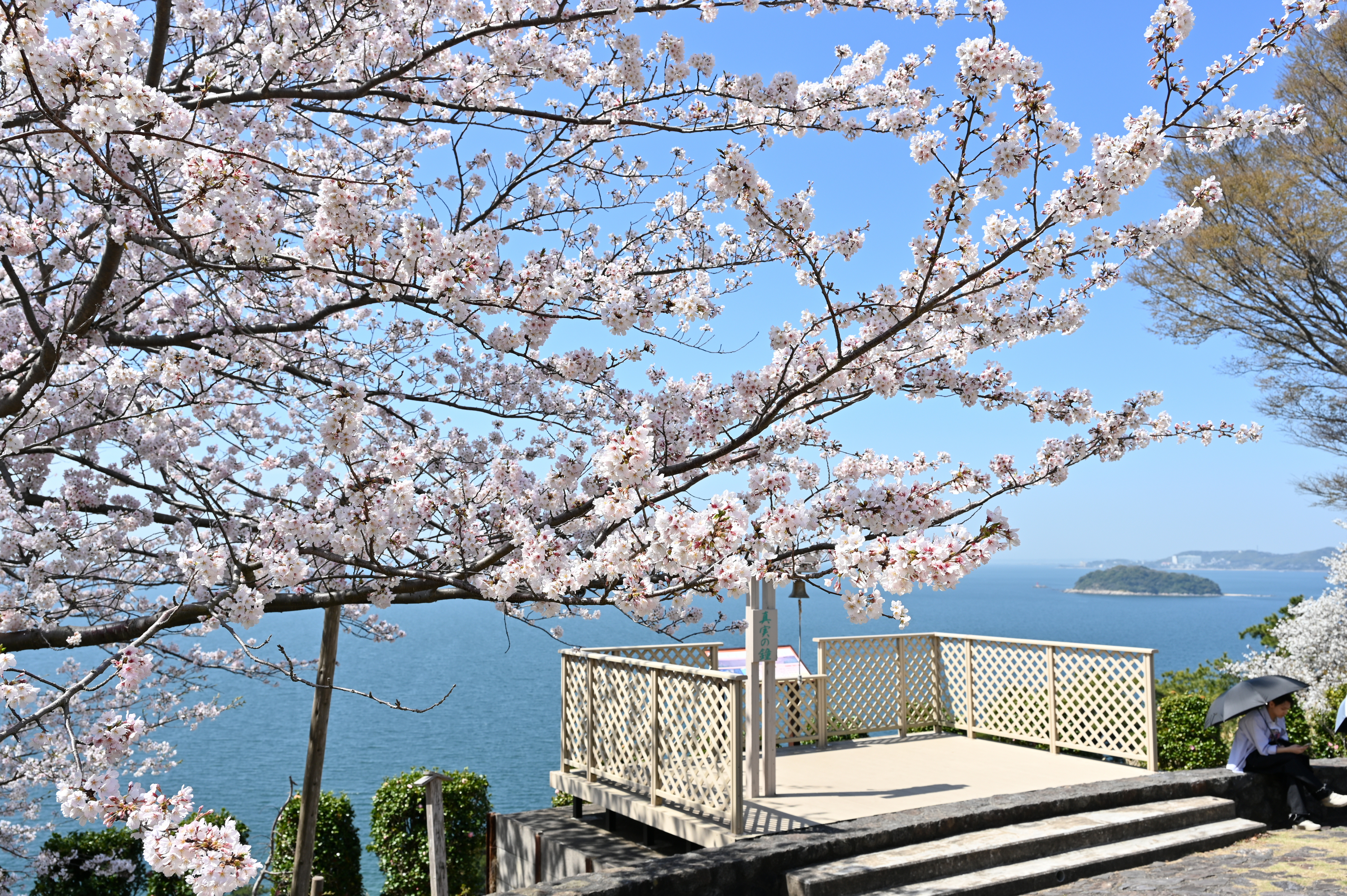
Nishiura Onsen

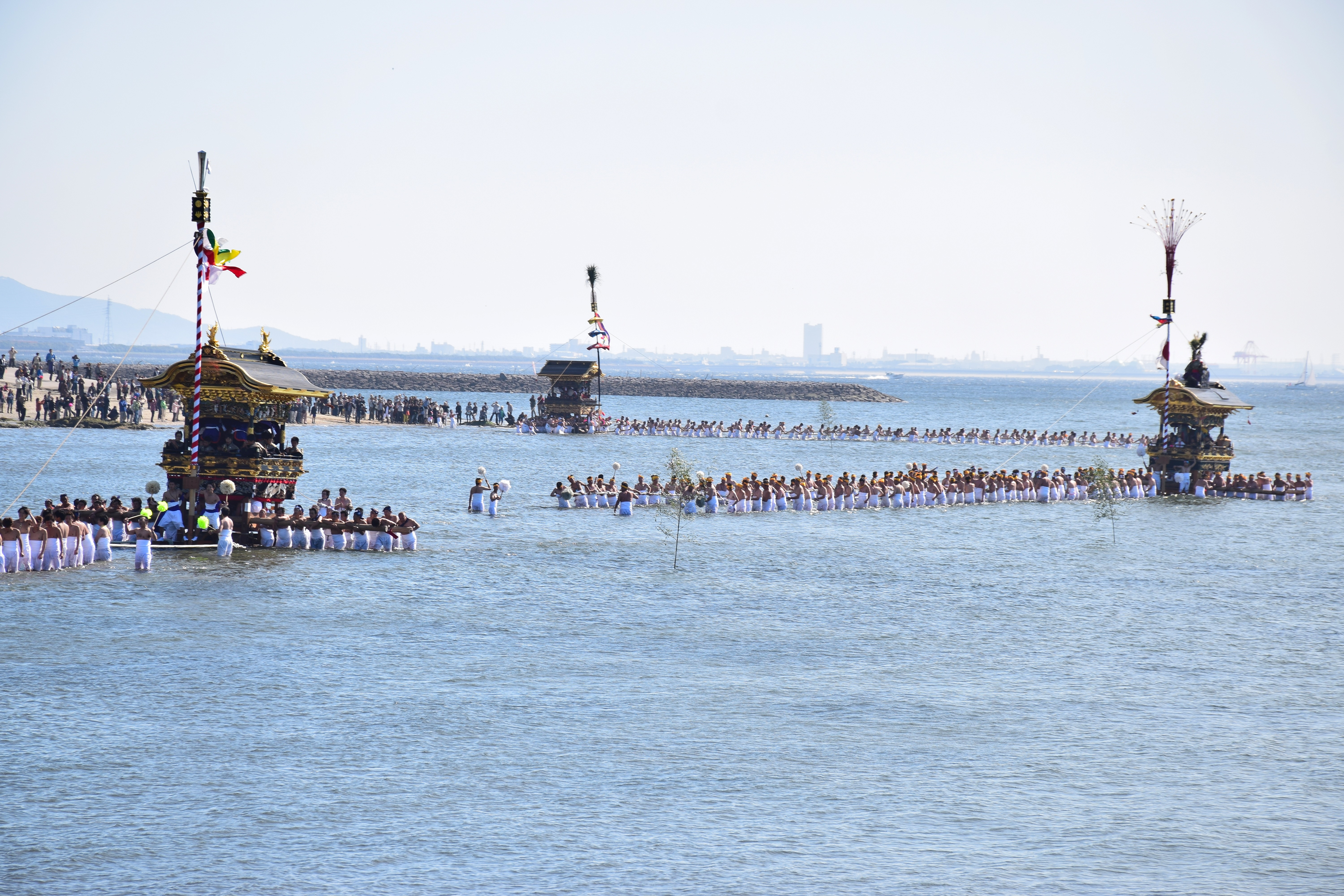
Miya festival

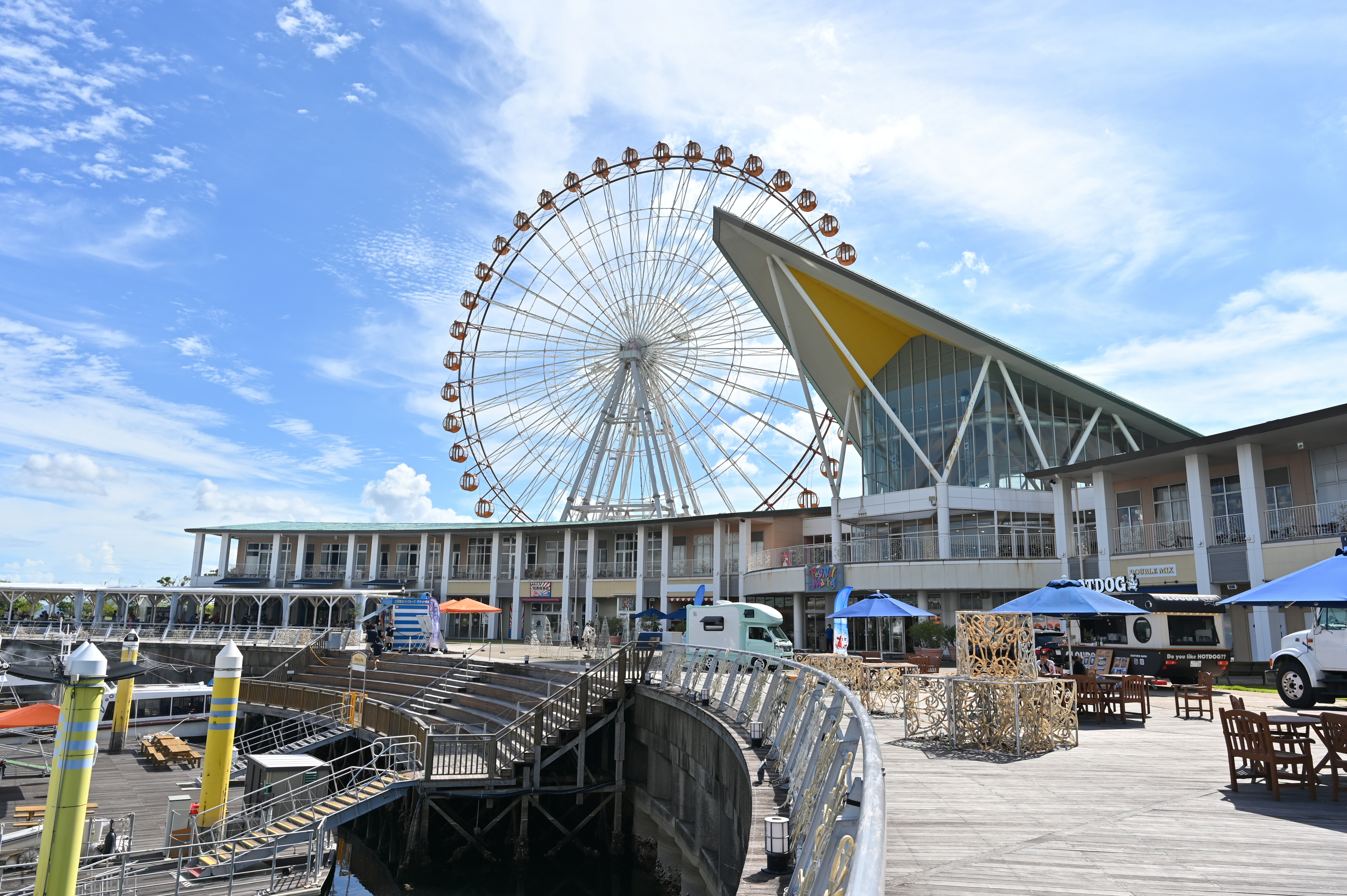
Laguna Ten Bosch

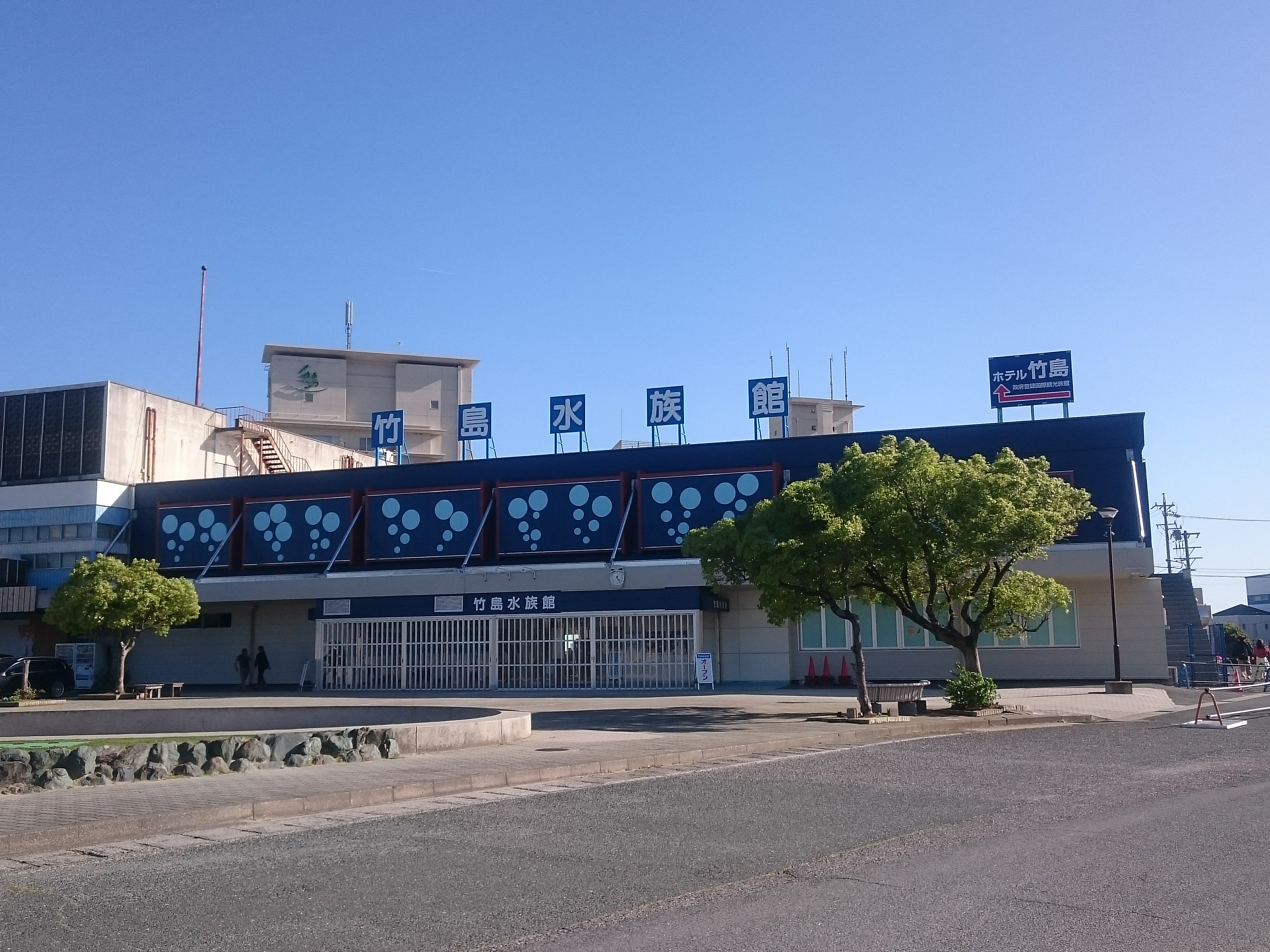
Takeshima Aquarium

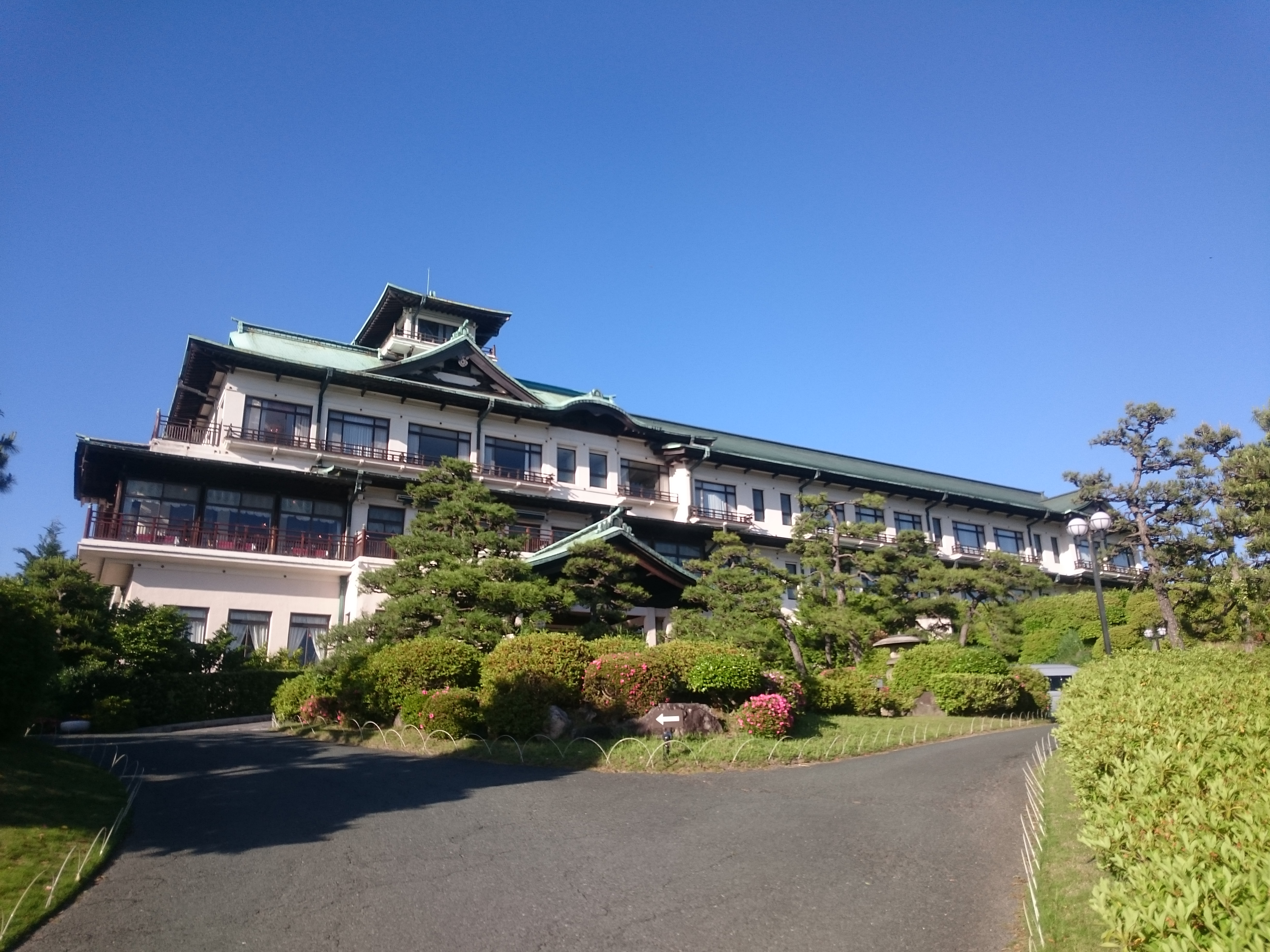
Gamagori Classic Hotel

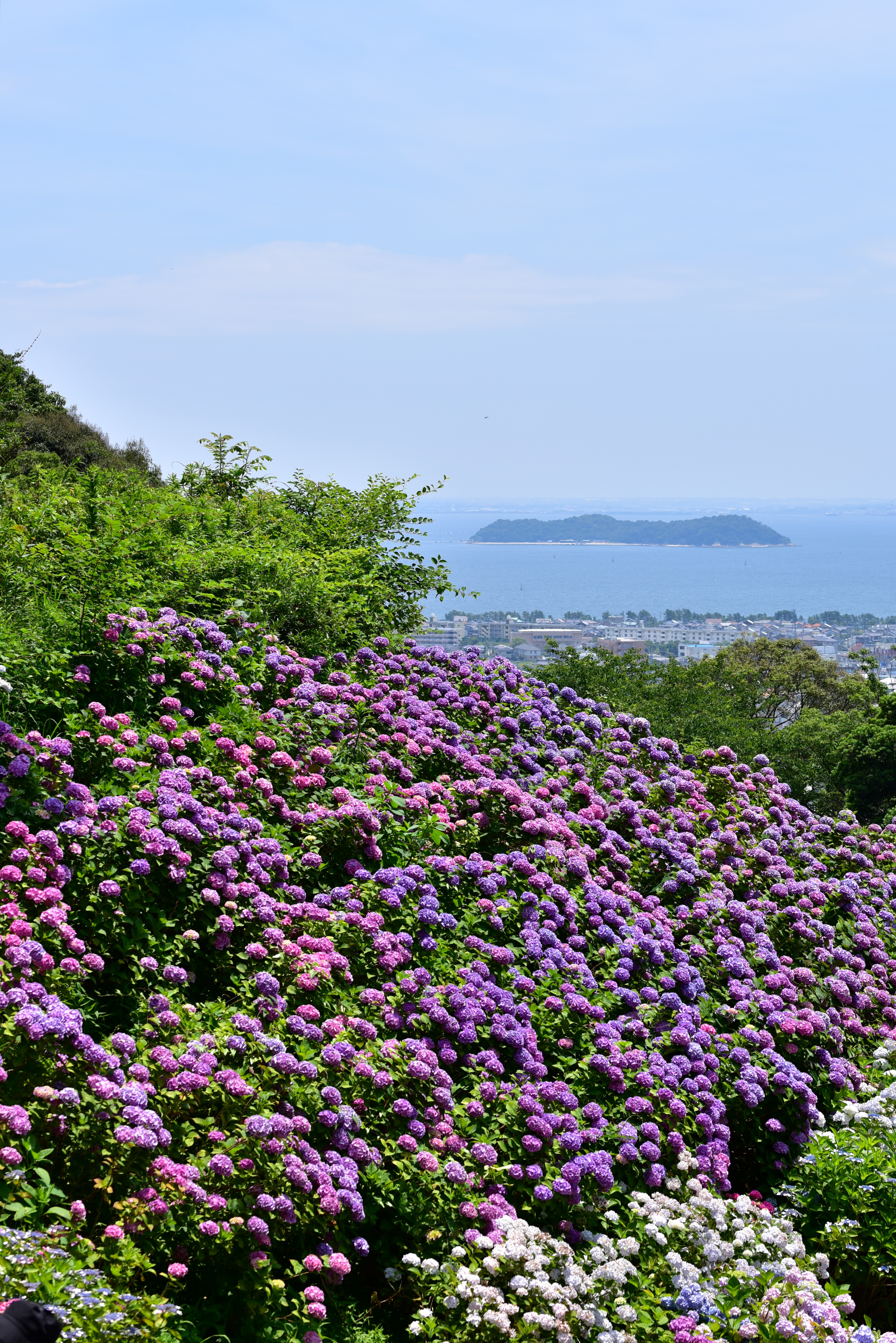
Katahara Onsen (Hydrangea Park)

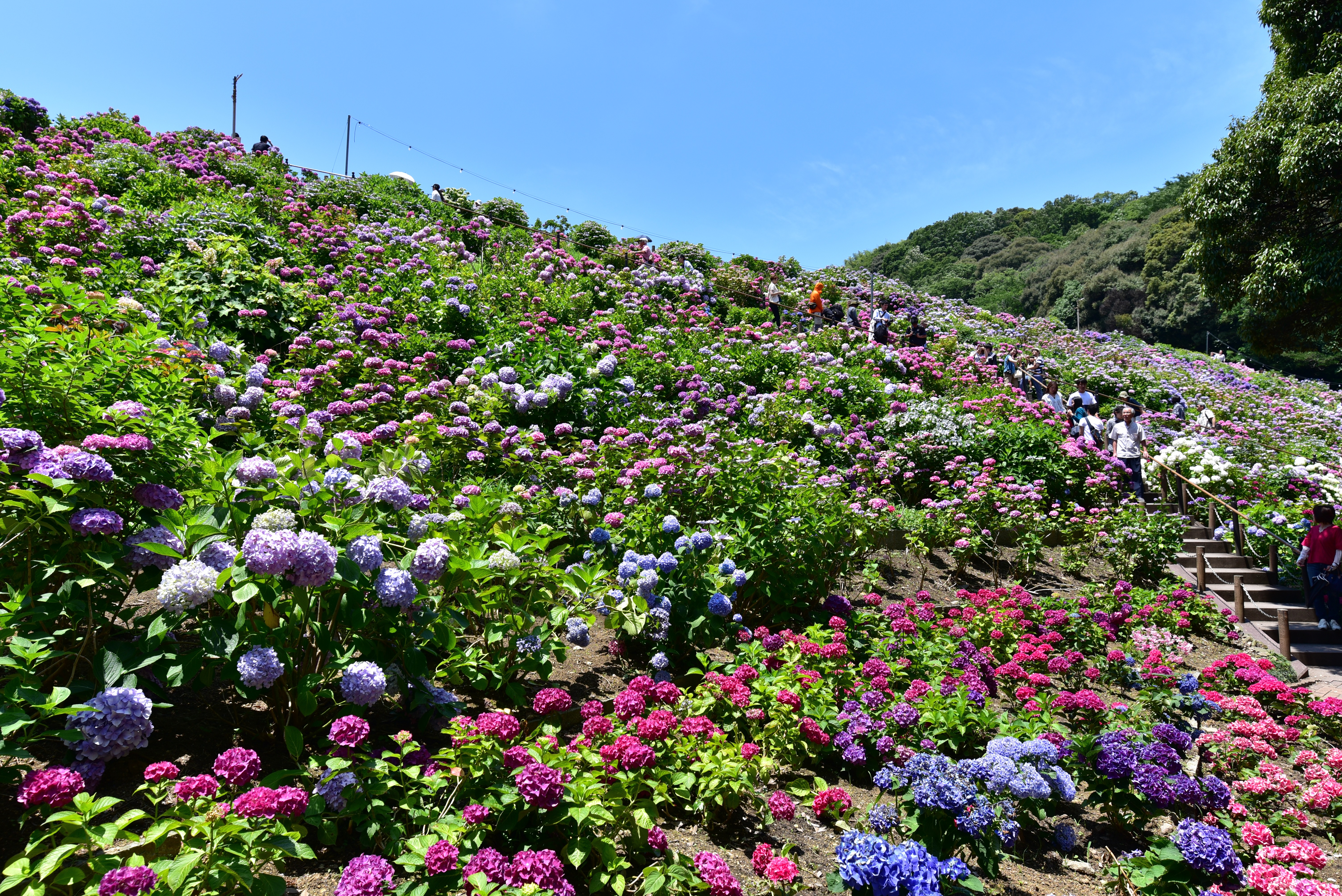
Katahara Onsen (Hydrangea Park)

== Notable people ==
- Keiichiro Hirano, Akutagawa-prize winning novelist
- Tamanoumi Masahiro, sumo wrestler
- Suzuki Mosaburō, politician
- Sakae Ōba, Captain of 18th Infantry Regiment
- Kodai Senga, pitcher for the New York Mets and Japan National Baseball Team
