= Mikawa–Ogihara Station =

Former railway station in Nishio, Aichi prefecture, Japan

Mikawa-Ogihara Station 三河荻原駅
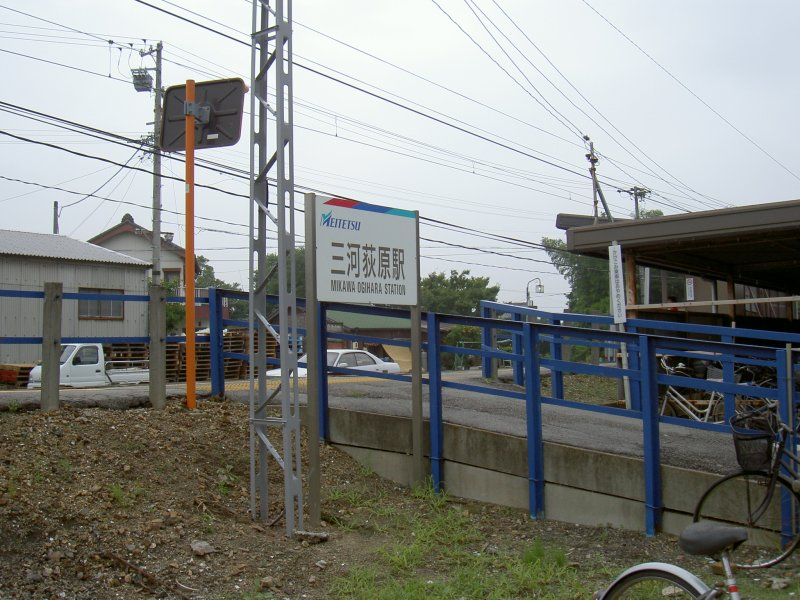
- Mikawa-Ogihara Station before being abandoned

General information
- Location: Kira-cho Ogihara, Nishio-shi, Aichi-ken; Japan
- Operator: Meitetsu
- Line: ■ Meitetsu Nishio Line
- Distance: 23.3 kilometers from Shin Anjō
- Platforms: 1 side platform

Other information
- Status: Unstaffed

History
- Opened: August 5, 1915
- Closed: December 16, 2006
- Former names: Ogihara Station

Passengers
- FY2005: 139 daily
Location

Mikawa-Ogihara Station (三河荻原駅, Mikawa-Ogihara-eki) was a railway station in the city of Nishio, Aichi, Japan, operated by Meitetsu.

== Lines ==
Mikawa–Ogihara Station was served by the Meitetsu Nishio Line, and was located 23.3 kilometers from The starting point of the line at Shin Anjō.

== History ==
The station was opened as Ogihara Station by the Nishio Railway Company in 1915, but was renamed to Mikawa-Ogihara in 1918. The station was closed due to the lack of users in 2006, along with 4 other stations owned by Meitetsu.

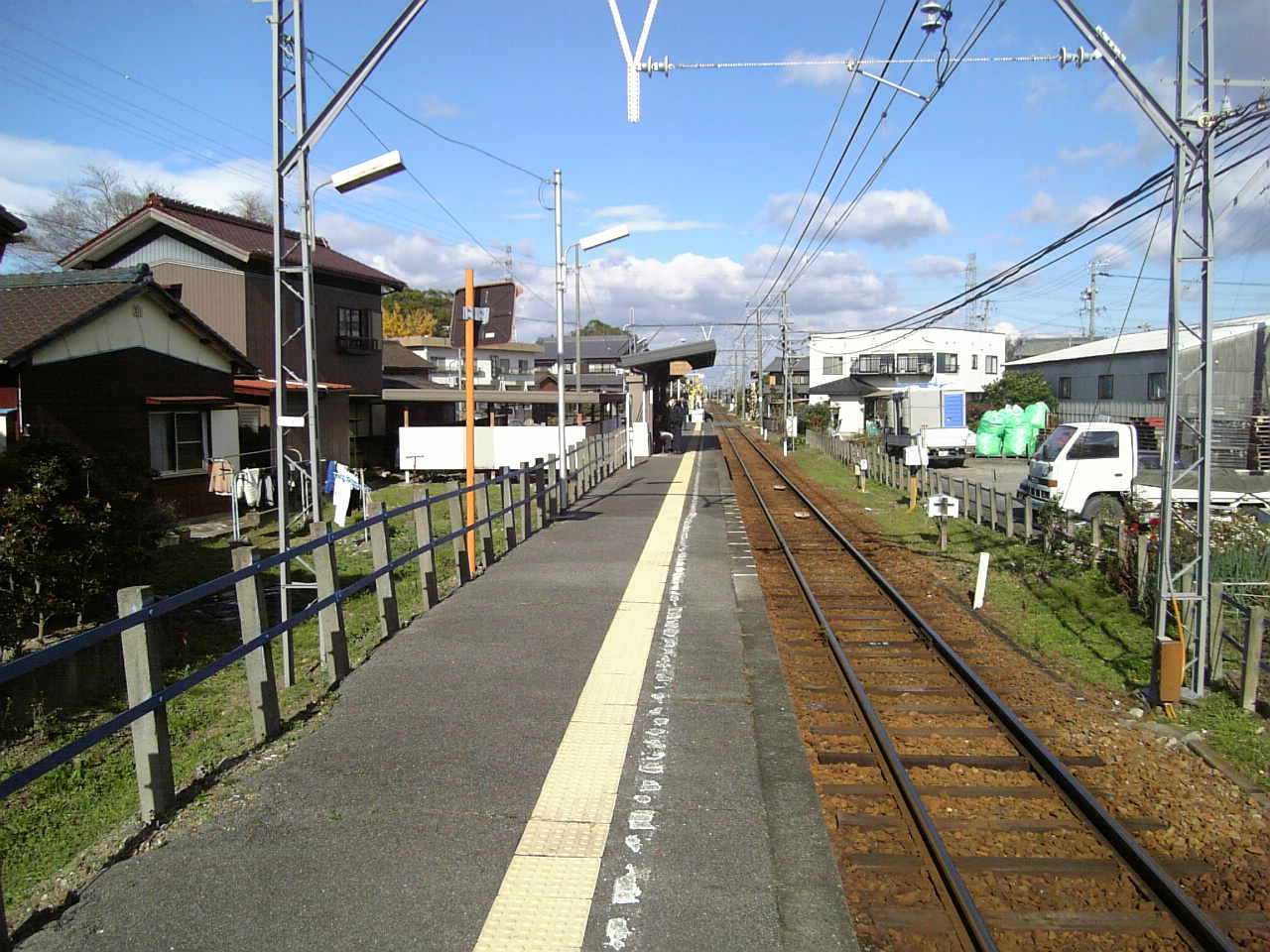
The platform of the station (December 2006)

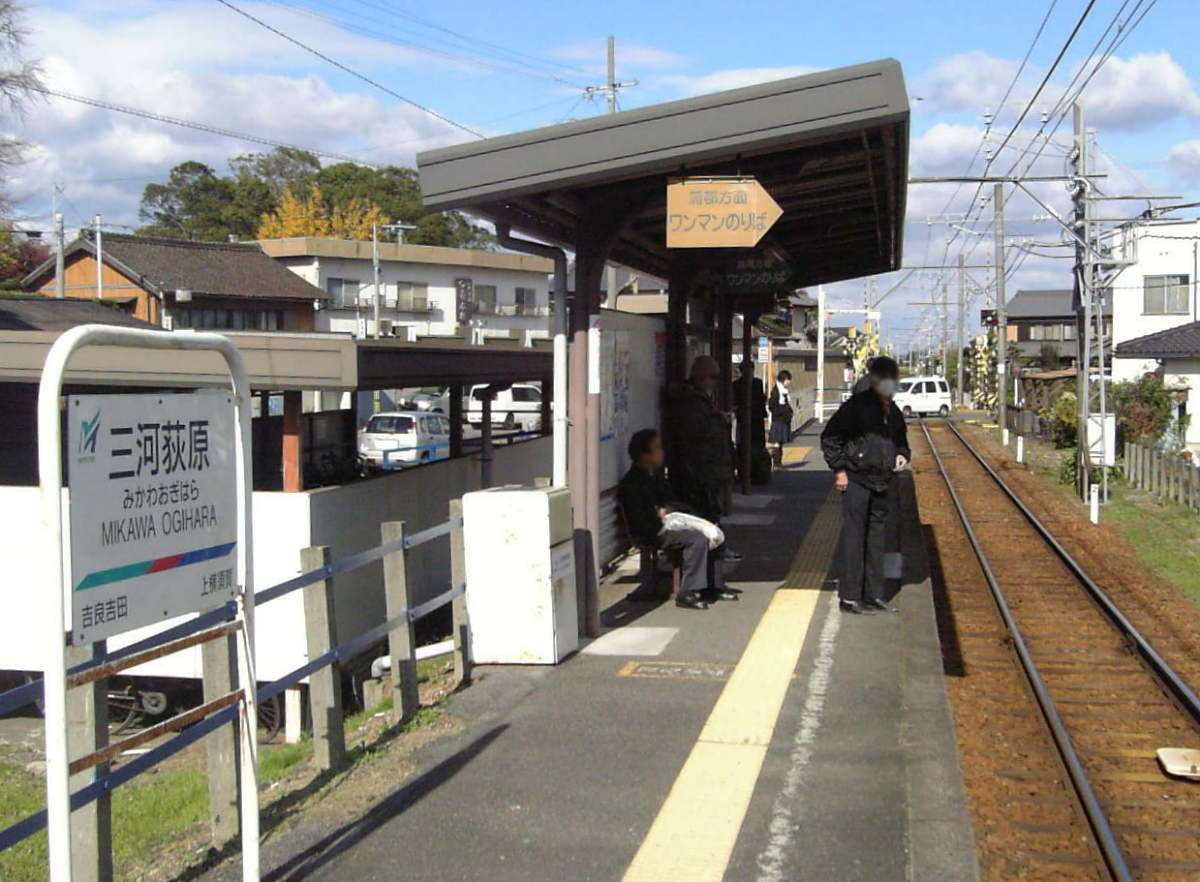
The sign at the station (December 2006)

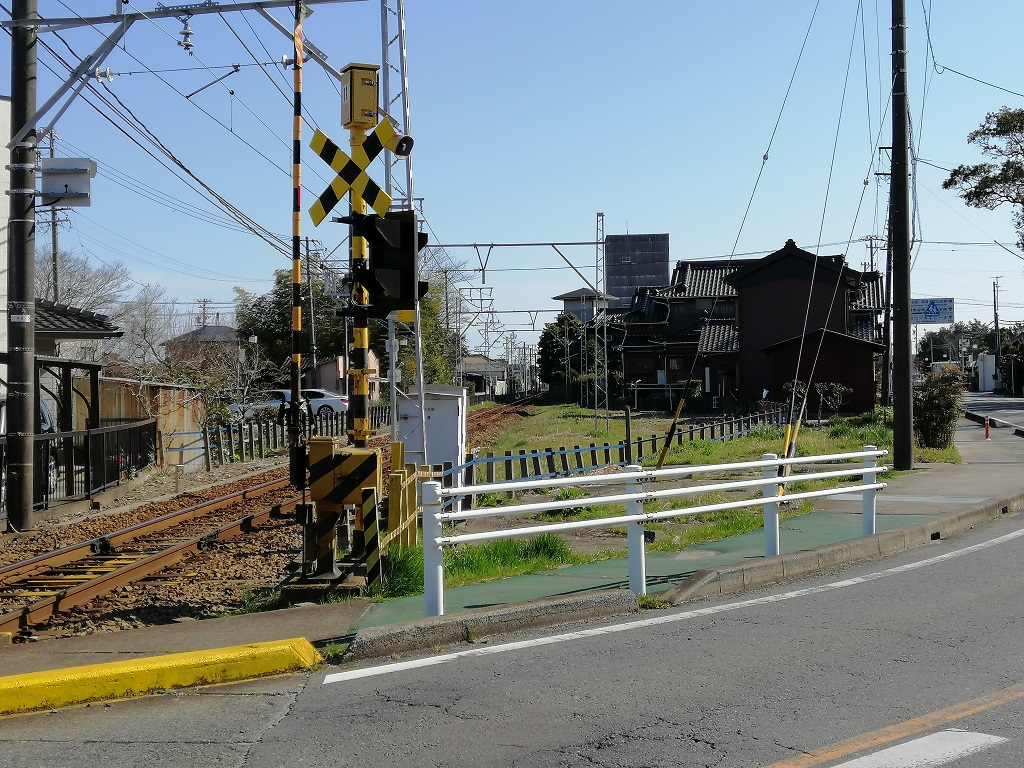
The location of former Mikawa–Ogihara Station (March 2020)

== Adjacent stations ==
Before the closure of the station in 2006, only local service trains stopped in the station.

■Local (One-person operation)

Kami-Yokosuka - Mikawa-Ogihara Station - Kira Yoshida

- Higashi-Tomida Station used to exist between the section in Kami-Yokosuka and Mikawa-Ogihara.

== Passenger statistics ==
In 2006, the station was used by an average of 139 boarding passengers daily.
