= Mikawa-Shiotsu Station =

Railway station in Gamagōri, Aichi Prefecture, Japan

CA48 Mikawa-Shiotsu Station 三河塩津駅
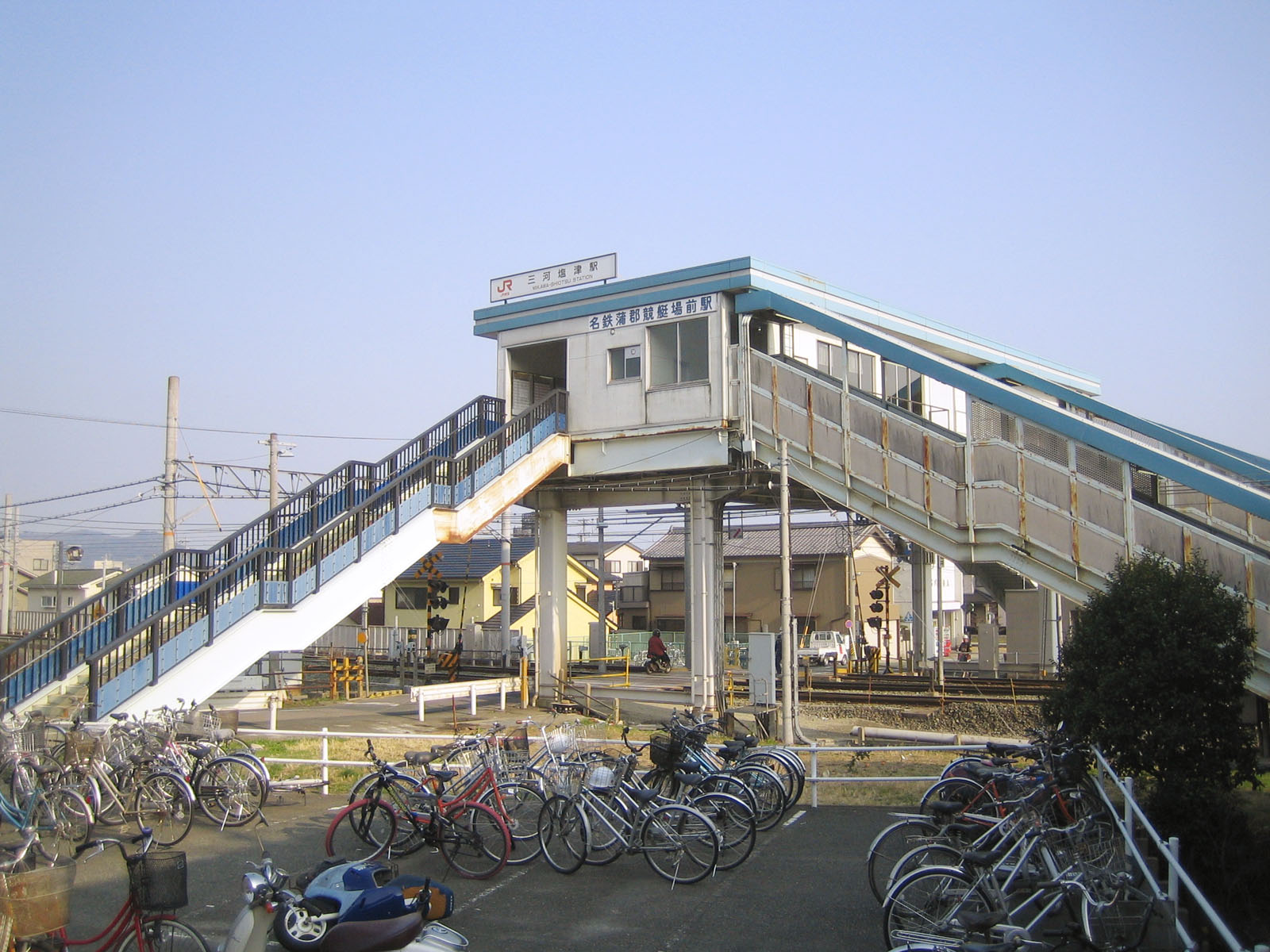
- Mikawa-Shiotsu Station

General information
- Location: 40-5 Yui Takenoyacho, Gamagori-shi, Aichi-ken 443-0046; Japan
- Coordinates: 34°49′33″N 137°12′8″E
- Operator: JR Central
- Line: Tokaido Main Line
- Distance: 312.9 kilometers from Tokyo
- Platforms: 2 side platforms

Other information
- Status: Unstaffed
- Station code: CA48

History
- Opened: November 16, 1988

Passengers
- 2023–2024: 2,660 daily
Location
- Location within Aichi Prefecture Location within Japan

Mikawa-Shiotsu Station (三河塩津駅, Mikawa-Shiotsu-eki) is a railway station in the city of Gamagōri, Aichi Prefecture, Japan, operated by Central Japan Railway Company (JR Tōkai).

== Lines ==
Mikawa-Shiotsu Station is served by the Tōkaidō Main Line, and is located 312.9 kilometers from the starting point of the line at Tokyo Station.

== Station layout ==
The station has two opposed side platforms connected to the elevated station building by a footbridge. The station building has automated ticket machines, TOICA automated turnstiles and is unattended.

=== Platforms ===
1	■ Tōkaidō Main Line	For Okazaki, Nagoya
2	■ Tōkaidō Main Line	For Toyohashi, Hamamatsu

== Adjacent stations ==
«	Service	»
Tōkaidō Main Line
Special Rapid: Does not stop at this station
New Rapid: Does not stop at this station
Rapid: Does not stop at this station
Gamagōri	Sectional Rapid	Sangane
Gamagōri	Local	Sangane

== Station history ==
Mikawa-Shiotsu Station was opened on 16 November 1988.

Station numbering was introduced to the section of the Tōkaidō Line operated JR Central in March 2018; Mikawa-Shiotsu Station was assigned station number CA48.

== Passenger statistics ==
In fiscal 2017, the station was used by an average of 1372 passengers daily (boarding passengers only).

== Surrounding area ==
- Shiotsu Elementary School
- Japan National Route 23

== See also ==
- List of railway stations in Japan
