= Gamagōri Station =

Railway station in Gamagōri, Aichi Prefecture, Japan

CA47 Gamagōri Station 蒲郡駅

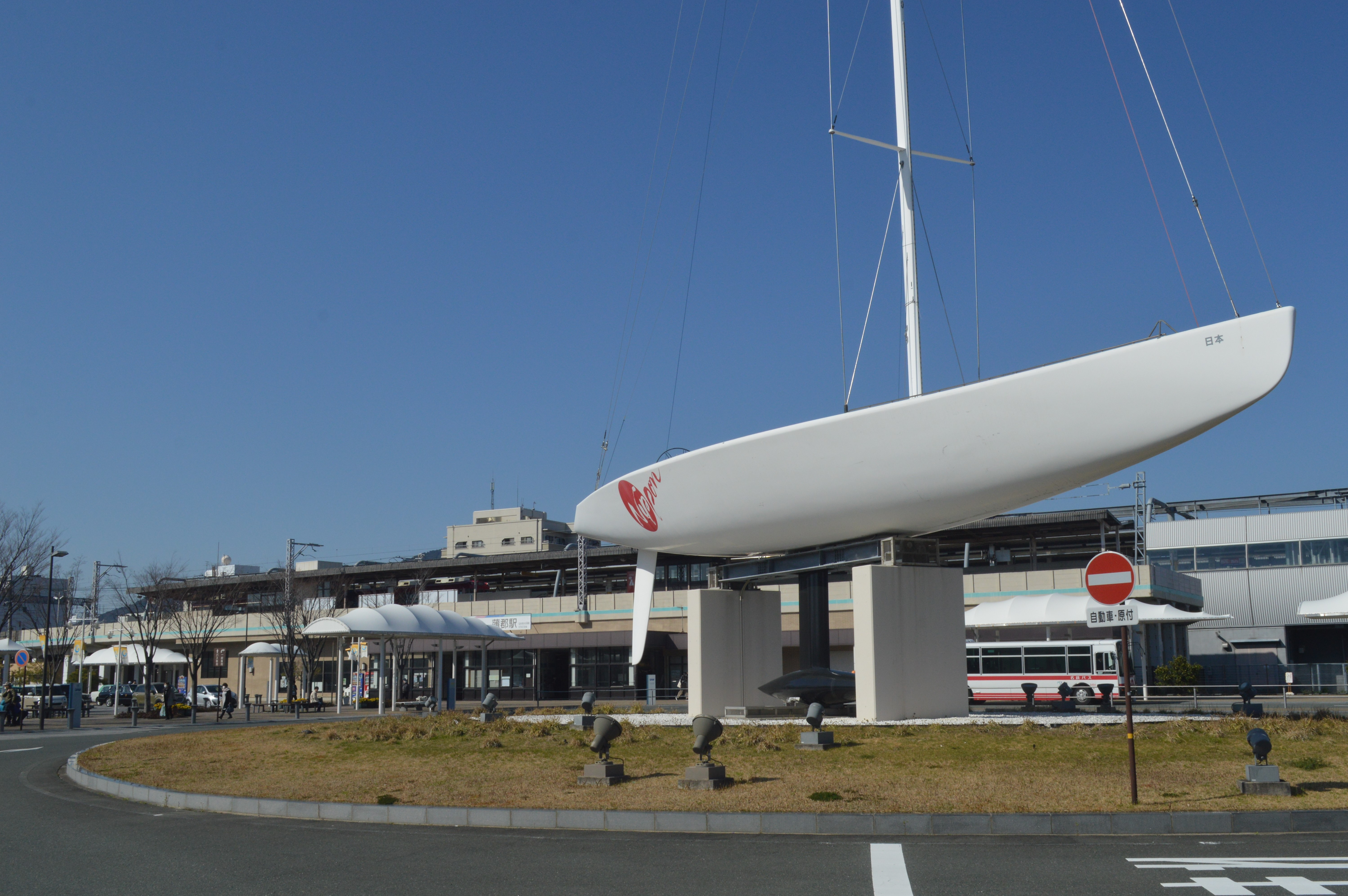

General information
- Location: 1-1 Motomachi, Gamagōri-shi, Aichi-ken 443-0043; Japan
- Coordinates: 34.8230693°N 137.2263622°E
- Operator: JR Central; Meitetsu
- Lines: Tokaido Main Line; ■ Meitetsu Gamagōri Line
- Distance: 310.6 kilometers from Tokyo
- Platforms: 3 island platforms

Other information
- Status: Staffed
- Station code: CA47, GN22
- Website: Official website (JR); Official website (Meitetsu)

History
- Opened: September 1, 1888

Passengers
- 2023–2024: 14,260 daily (JR); 2,379 daily (Meitetsu)

Services
Preceding station	JR Central	Following station
Okazaki towards Maibara	Tōkaidō Main Line Special Rapid	Toyohashi towards Atami
Okazaki towards Maibara	Tōkaidō Main Line New Rapid Rapid	Mikawa Miya towards Atami
Kōda towards Maibara	Tōkaidō Main Line New Rapid Rapid	Mikawa Miya towards Atami
Mikawa-Shiotsu towards Maibara	Tōkaidō Main Line Semi Rapid Local	Mikawa Miya towards Atami
Preceding station	Meitetsu	Following station
Gamagōri-Kyōteijō-Mae towards Kira Yoshida	Gamagōri Line	Terminus
Location
- Location within Aichi Prefecture Location within Japan

station layout

Gamagōri Station (蒲郡駅, Gamagōri-eki) is a railway station in the city of Gamagōri, Aichi Prefecture, Japan, jointly operated by the Central Japan Railway Company (JR Tōkai) and Meitetsu.

== Lines ==
Gamagōri Station is 310.6 kilometers from Tokyo Station on the Tōkaidō Main Line and serves as a terminal station for the 17.6 kilometer Meitetsu Gamagōri Line.

== Station layout ==
=== JR Central ===
The JR Central station has two elevated island platforms serving four tracks, of which only the inner tracks (tracks 2 and 3) are normally used. The station building is underneath the platforms and has automated ticket machines, TOICA automated turnstiles and is staffed.

1/2	■ Tōkaidō Main Line	for Toyohashi and Hamamatsu
3/4	■ Tōkaidō Main Line	for Okazaki and Nagoya

=== Meitetsu ===
Meitetsu Gamagōri Station has a single elevated island platform serving two tracks. Both tracks terminate at this station.

1	■ Meitetsu Gamagōri Line	for Kira Yoshida
2	■ Meitetsu Gamagōri Line	for Kira Yoshida

== Station history ==
Gamagōri Station opened on September 1, 1888 when the section of the Japanese Government Railway (JGR) connecting Hamamatsu Station with Ōbu Station was completed. This line was named the Tōkaidō Line in 1895. On July 24, 1936, the Mikawa Railway (now part of Meitetsu) connected to Gamagōri Station. The JGR became the JNR after World War II. The JNR portion of the station was extensively remodeled in the mid-1960s, with a new station building completed from 1968-1969. The Meitesu portion was likewise remodeled in the early 1970s, with a new station building and bus terminal completed in 1972. With the dissolution and privatization of the JNR on April 1, 1987, the JNR station came under the control of the Central Japan Railway Company. The Tōkaidō Line tracks were elevated in 2003-2005, and a JR station building was completed in 2006. Automated turnstiles using the TOICA IC Card system came into operation from November 25, 2006.

Station numbering was introduced to the section of the Tōkaidō Line operated JR Central in March 2018; Gamagōri Station was assigned station number CA47.

== Passenger statistics ==
In fiscal 2017, the JR portion of the station was used by an average of 7,838 passengers daily (boarding passengers only) and the Meitetsu portion of the station by 1407 passengers daily.

== Surrounding area ==
- Gamagōri City Hall
- Gamagōri High School

== See also ==
- List of railway stations in Japan
