= Aisin Wings =

Aisin Wings アイシン ウィングス
- League: Women's Japan Basketball League
- Founded: 1979; 47 years ago
- History: Aisin AW Wings
- Arena: Anjochiku Kibonooka Gymnasium; Anjō City Gymnasium
- Location: Anjo, Aichi
- Website: www.aisin.com/jp/sports/wings/
Home	Away

The Aisin Wings (アイシン ウィングス, Aishin Uinguzu) are a Japanese professional basketball team based in Anjo, Aichi. The Wings complete in the "Premier" first division of the Women's Japan Basketball League (WJBL).

== Notable players ==
Former logo

- Maki Eguchi
- Kadija Konate
- Kiho Miyashita
- Mayumi Yoshiyama

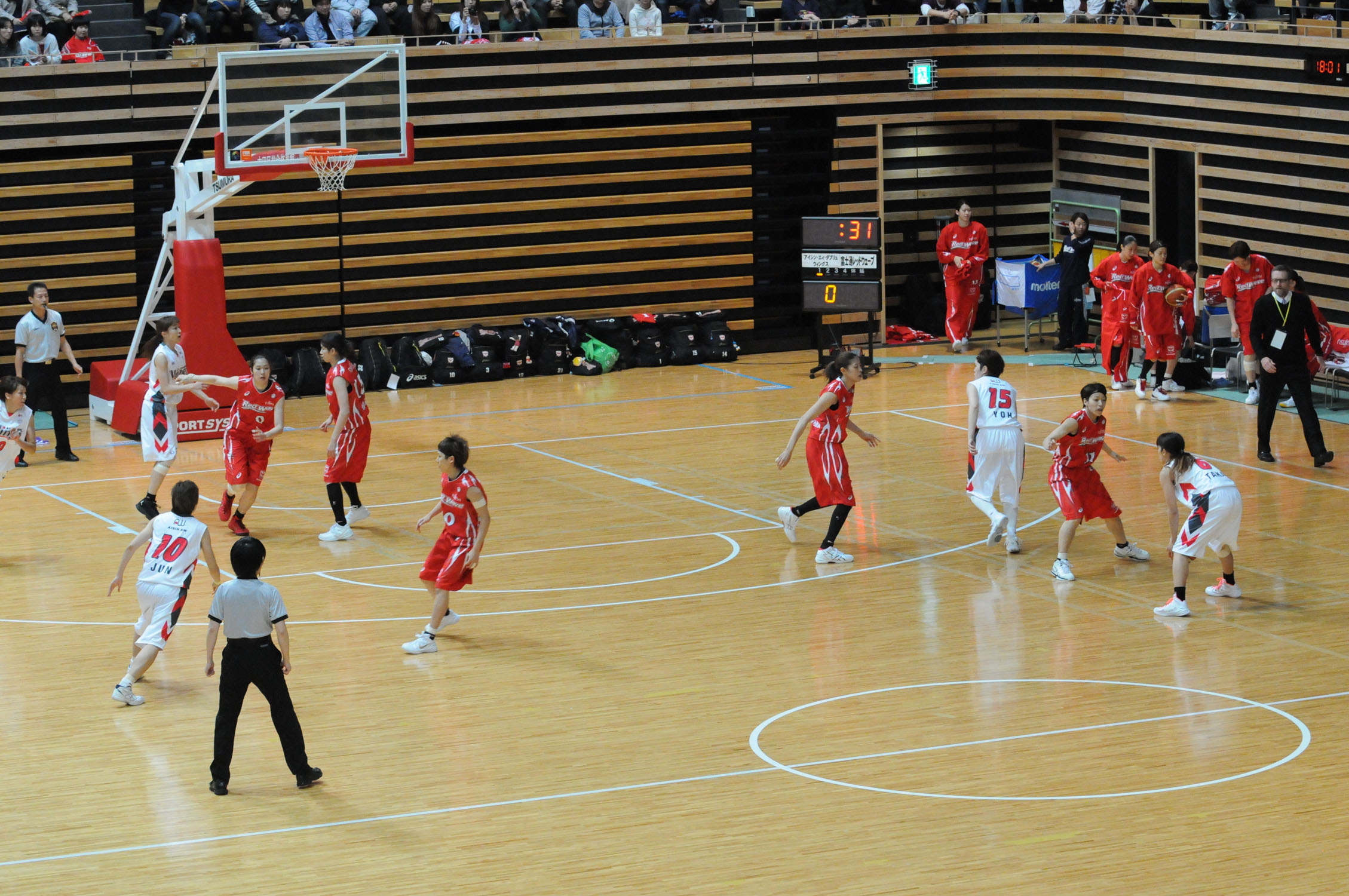

== Coaches ==
- Kagari Yamada

== Practice facilities ==
- Anjochiku Kibonooka Gymnasium
