= Aisin Areions =

- Leagues: B3 league
- Founded: 1978
- Dissolved: 2022
- History: Aisin AW Areions Anjo
- Arena: Anjochiku Kibonooka Gymnasium
- Capacity: 996
- Location: Anjō, Aichi
- Website: Official website
Home	Away

The Aisin Areions (アイシン・アレイオンズ) was a professional basketball team that competed in the third division of the Japanese B.League.

== Coaches ==
- Shingo Fujimura
- Kensaku Tennichi

== Roster ==
Aisin Areions roster
Players
Coaches

Pos.	No.	Nat.	Name
PG	3	(Japan)	Riki Takahashi
PF	5	(United States)	Marcus Dove
SG	6	(Japan)	Kenji Nagasawa
PF	7	(Japan)	Ryosuke Terabe
SF	10	(Japan)	Wataru Murakishi
F/C	11	(United States)	Nigel Spikes
PG	17	(Japan)	Yuki Ishihara
SF	24	(Japan)	Kenshin Urabe
F	33	(Japan)	Shunsuke Fujita
PG	37	(Japan)	Takumi Watanabe
C	38	(Japan)	Hayato Miyawaki
C	40	(United States)	Jordan Faison
PG	81	(Japan)	Naoki Ishikawa

Head coach

Kengo Nakajima

Assistant coach(es)

Kyohei Kumazawa

Legend

- (C) Team captain
- Injured

- Roster
Updated: 2021

== Notable players ==
Former logo

- Marcus Dove
- Jordan Faison
- Markhuri Sanders-Frison
- Shingo Fujimura
- Kevin Kotzur
- Josh Peppers
- Kyle Richardson
- Nigel Spikes

== Arenas ==
- Anjō City Gymnasium
- Anjochiku Kibonooka Gymnasium
- Anjo City Sports Center
- Echizen City AW-I Sports Arena
- Toyohashi City General Gymnasium
- Gamagori Citizens Sports Center
- Nishio City General Gymnasium
- Hekinan City Seaside Gymnasium

== Practice facilities ==
- Anjochiku Kibonooka Gymnasium
