= Anjochiku Kibonooka Gymnasium =

Arena in Anjo, Aichi, Japan

Coordinates: 34°54′8.8″N 137°4′26.5″E

- 安城地区 希望の丘体育館
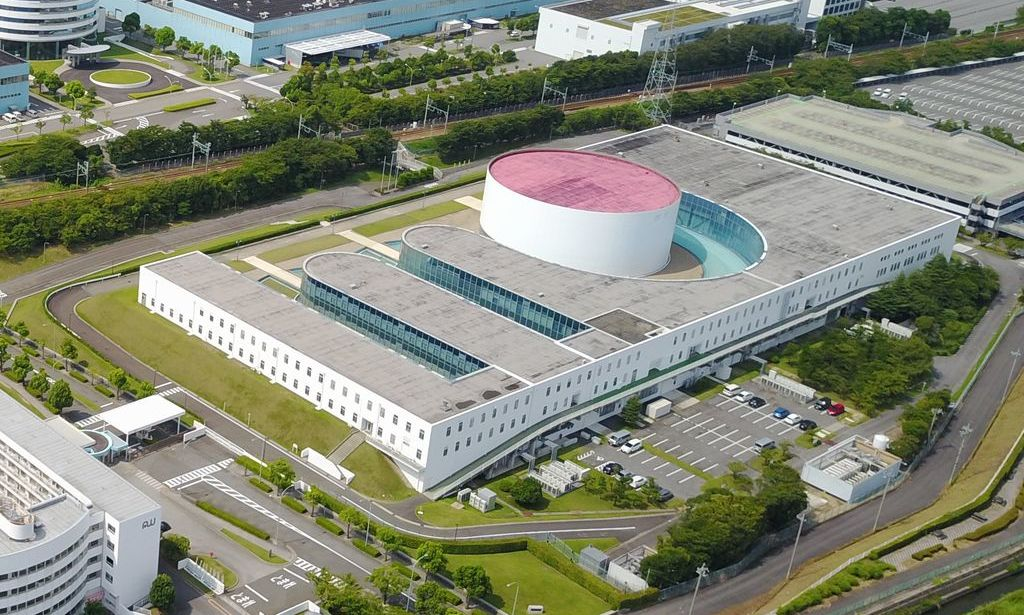
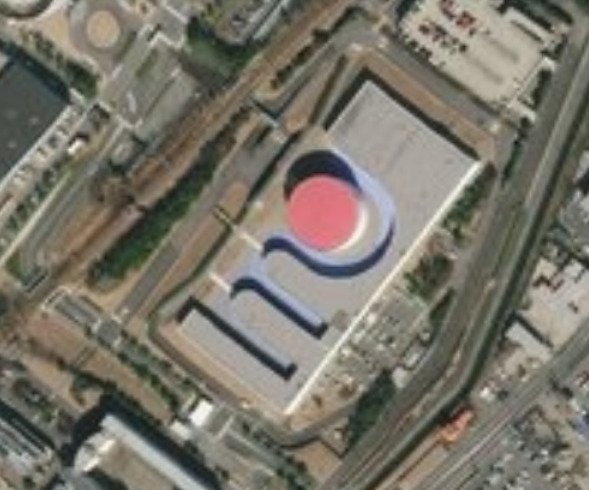
- Interactive map of Anjochiku Kibonooka Gymnasium
- Full name: 安城地区 希望の丘体育館
- Former names: Aisin AW Gymnasium
- Location: Anjo, Aichi, Japan
- Owner: Aisin Areions
- Operator: Aisin Areions

Construction
- Cost

Tenants
- Aisin Areions; Aisin Wings

Website
- HP

Anjochiku Kibonooka Gymnasium is an arena in Anjo, Aichi, Japan. It is the home arena of the Aisin Areions of the B.League, Japan's professional basketball league.

== Facilities ==
- Main arena -
