= Shingo Fujimura =

Japanese basketball coach

Shingo Fujimura 藤村慎吾
Aisin AW Areions Anjo
- Position: Head coach
- League: B.League

Personal information
- Born: September 19, 1983 (age 43) Miyakonojo, Miyazaki
- Listed height: 5 ft 7 in (1.70 m)

Career information
- High school: Kobayashi (Kobayashi, Miyazaki)
- College: Chukyo University

Career history

Playing
- xxxx-xxxx: Aisin AW Areions Anjo

Coaching
- xxxx-present: Aisin AW Areions Anjo

Shingo Fujimura (藤村慎吾, Fujimura Shingo) is the Head coach of the Aisin AW Areions Anjo in the Japanese B.League.

== Head coaching record ==
Legend
Regular season	G	Games coached	W	Games won	L	Games lost	W–L %	Win–loss %
Playoffs	PG	Playoff games	PW	Playoff wins	PL	Playoff losses	PW–L %	Playoff win–loss %

Team	Year	G	W	L	W–L%	Finish	PG	PW	PL	PW–L%	Result
Aisin AW Areions Anjo	2017-18	32	11	21	.344	7th in B3	-	-	-	–	-
