= Anjō =

Anjō 安城市
- City
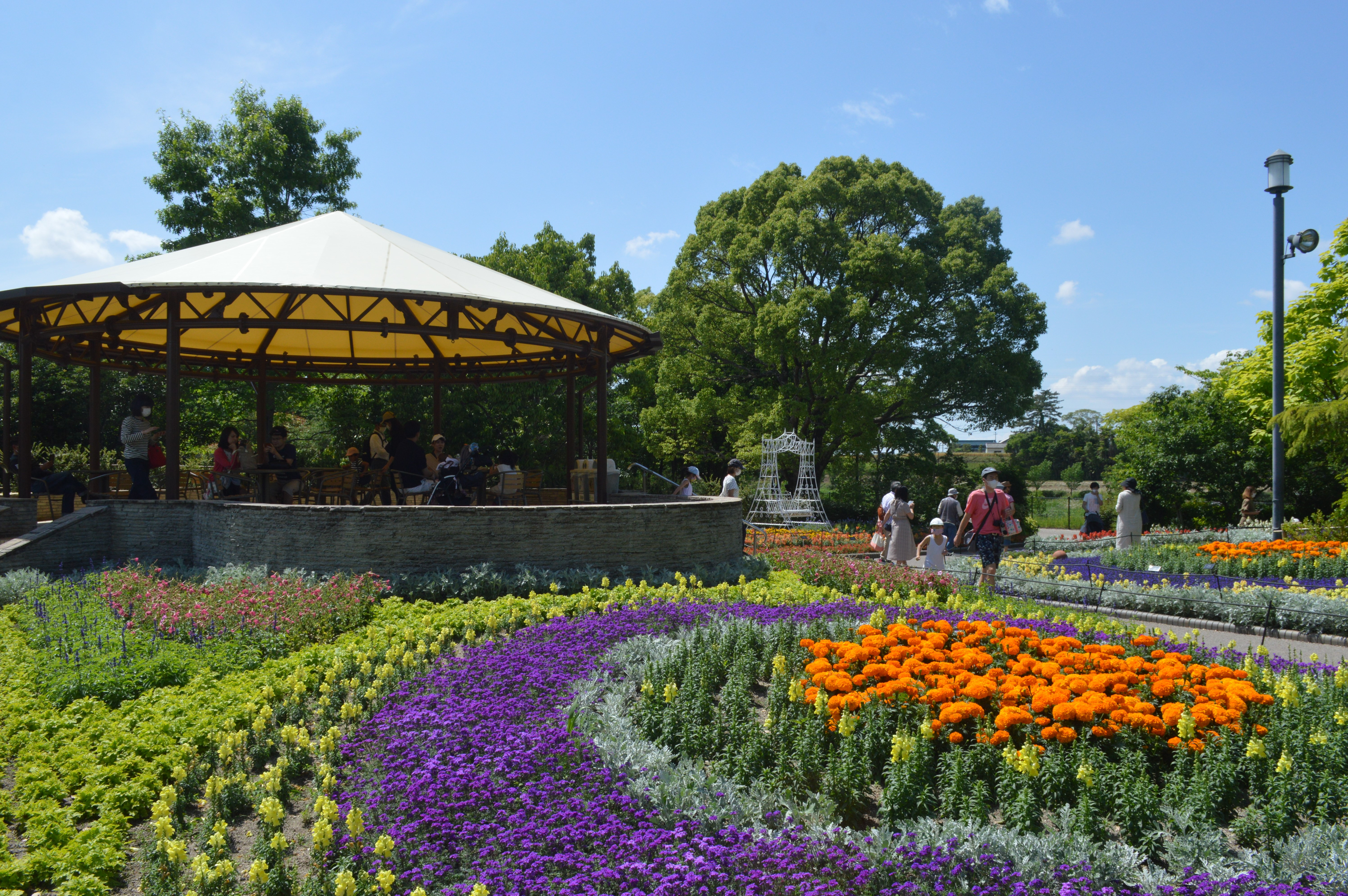
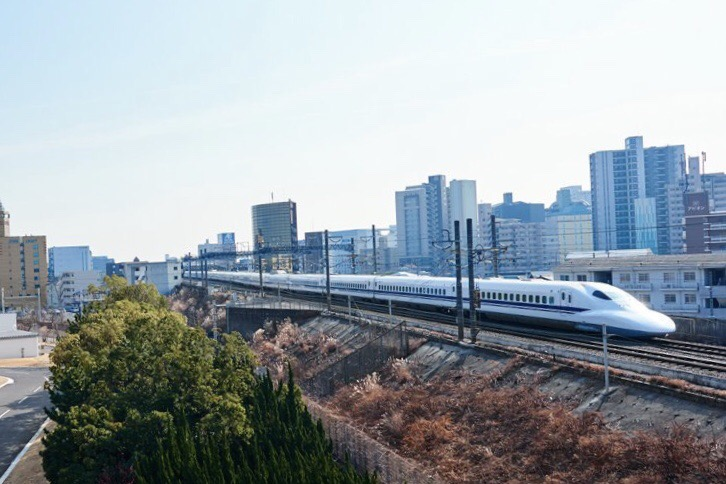
- Upper stage: Den Park; Lower stage: Skyline of Mikawaanjō

- Flag Seal

- Location of Anjō within Aichi Prefecture

- Coordinates: 34°57′31.4″N 137°4′49.2″E
- Country: Japan
- Region: Chūbu (Tōkai)
- Prefecture: Aichi

Government
  - Mayor: Gaku Kamiya

Area
  - Total: 86.05 km^{2} (33.22 sq mi)
- Elevation: 10 m (33 ft)

Population (October 1, 2019)
  - Total: 188,693
  - Density: 2,193/km^{2} (5,679/sq mi)
- Time zone: UTC+9 (Japan Standard Time)
  - Tree: Japanese Black Pine
  - Flower: Scarlet Sage
- Phone number: 0566-76-1111
- Address: 18–23 Sakuramachi, Anjō-shi, Aichi-ken 446-8501
- Website: Official website

Anjō (安城市, Anjō-shi; Japanese pronunciation: [ä́ɲ̟̀.ɟ̟͡ʑò̞ò̞, ä̀ɲ̟́.ɟ̟͡ʑó̞ò̞.ɕì, ä́ɲ̟́.ɟ̟͡ʑó̞ò̞-]) is a city in Aichi Prefecture, Japan. As of 1 October 2019, the city had an estimated population of 188,693 in 76,087 households, and a population density of 2,193 persons per km². The total area of the city was 86.05 square kilometres (33.22 sq mi).

== Geography ==
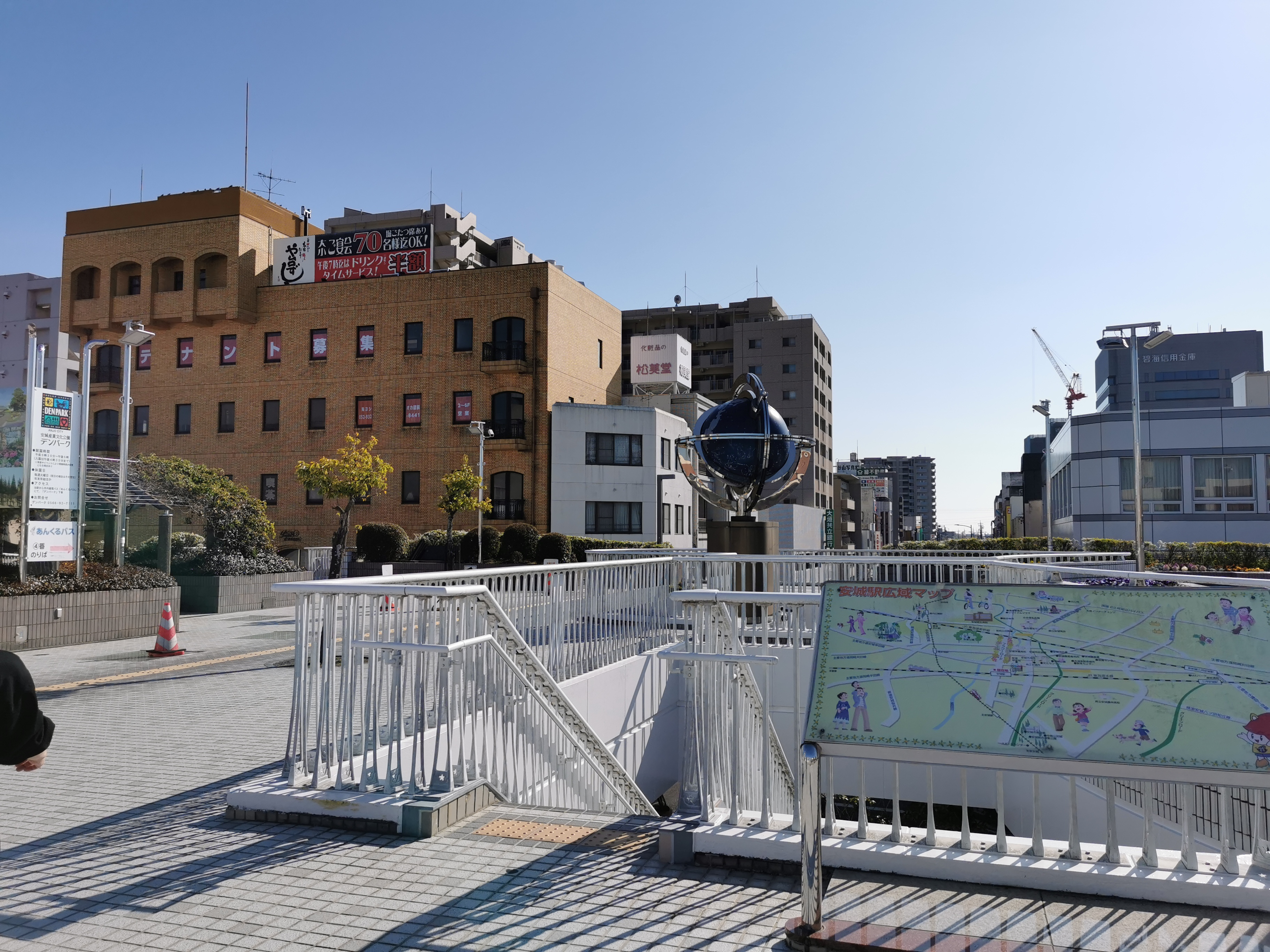
Downtown of Anjō

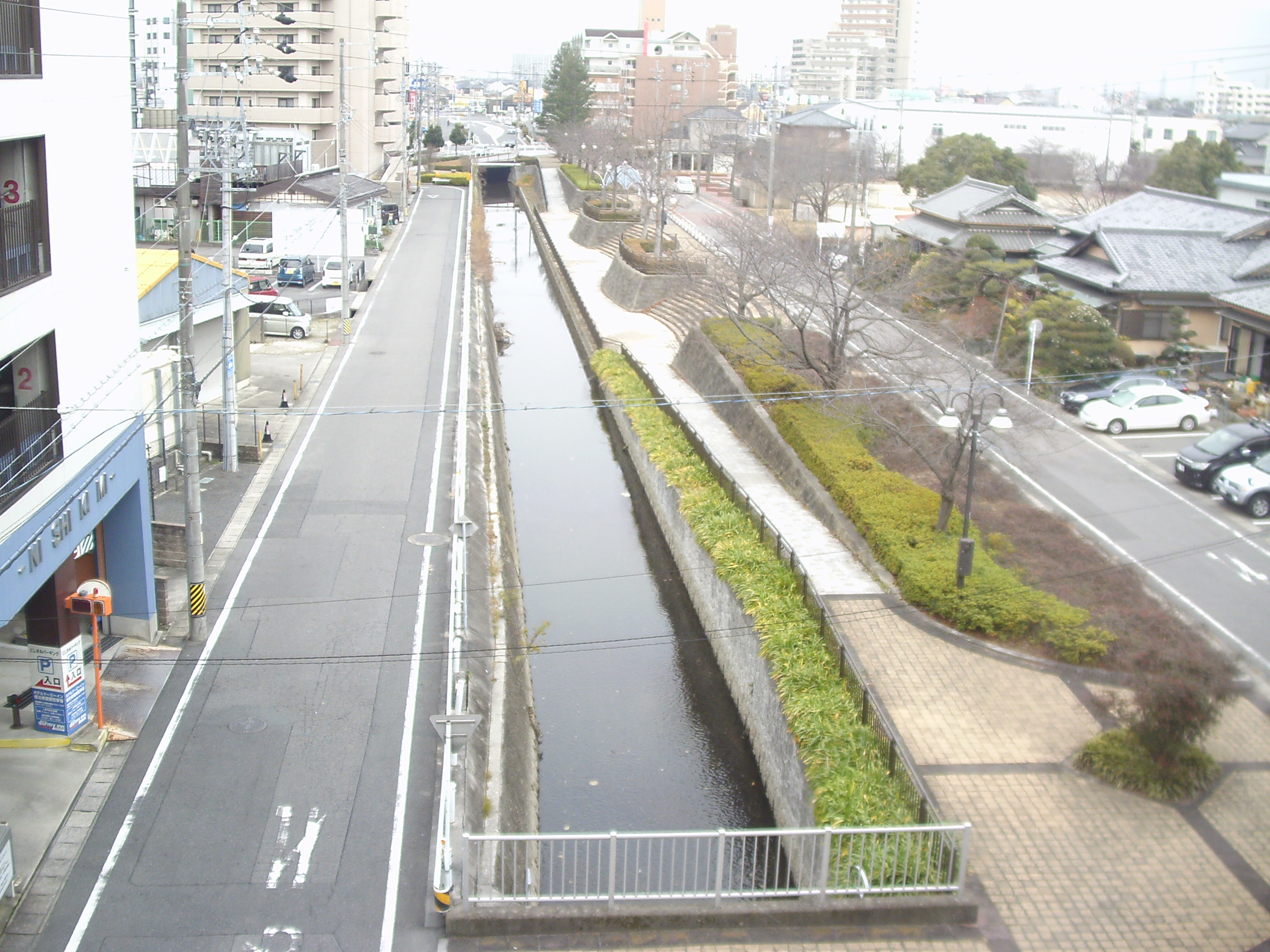
Meiji Irrigation canal

Anjō is situated in southern Aichi Prefecture, approximately 30 kilometres (19 mi) from central Nagoya, in the center of the Okazaki Plain, on the west bank of the Yahagi River. National Route 1 and National Route 23 provide the main east-west access through the city, with Aichi Prefectural Route 48 running between the two.

=== Climate ===
The city has a climate characterized by hot and humid summers, and relatively mild winters (Köppen climate classification Cfa). The average annual temperature in Anjō is 15.6 °C. The average annual rainfall is 1576 mm with September as the wettest month. The temperatures are highest on average in August, at around 27.7 °C, and lowest in January, at around 4.4 °C.

=== Demographics ===
Per Japanese census data, the population of Anjō has grown rapidly over the past 70 years.

Historical population
Year	Pop.	±%
1940	46,737	—
1950	61,037	+30.6%
1960	66,793	+9.4%
1970	94,307	+41.2%
1980	123,843	+31.3%
1990	142,251	+14.9%
2000	158,824	+11.7%
2010	178,738	+12.5%

=== Neighboring municipalities ===
Aichi Prefecture

- Chiryū
- Hekinan
- Kariya
- Nishio
- Okazaki
- Takahama
- Toyota

== History ==
=== Origins ===
The area of present-day Anjō has been continuously occupied since prehistoric times. Archaeologists have found numerous remains from the Japanese Paleolithic period and burial mounds from the Kofun period.

=== Ancient history ===
During the Nara period, the area was assigned to ancient Hekikai County, and was divided into several shōen during the Heian period, largely under the control of the Fujiwara clan or the Taira clan.

=== Feudal period ===
However, in the Kamakura period, parts of the territory came under the control of the Jōdo Shinshū sect, who challenged the secular authority of the various samurai clans, most notably the Matsudaira clan.

During the Sengoku period, numerous fortifications were erected in the area.

=== Early modern period ===
Tokugawa Ieyasu unified the region and destroyed the power of the Jōdo Shinshū sect in the Battle of Azukizaka (1564). During the Edo period, half of present-day Anjō was controlled by Okazaki Domain and the other half by Kariya Domain under the Tokugawa shogunate with some scattered portions of tenryō territory ruled directly by the shogunate. During this period, the area was noted for its production of cotton and textiles.

=== Late modern period ===
At the start of the Meiji period, on October 1, 1889, Anjō was one of a collection of villages organized within Hekikai District, Aichi Prefecture by the establishment of the modern municipalities system. It was elevated to town status on May 1, 1906. The opening of the Meiji Irrigation Canal transformed the area in the 1920s and 1930s into one of the most agriculturally productive regions of the period, sparking the comparison with Denmark, then regarded the most highly advanced agricultural nation in the world. This led to Anjō's moniker of "Japan's Denmark" (日本デンマーク), which remains in the form of Den Park, a Danish theme park, as well as Den Beer, a microbrew available in the park.

=== Contemporary history ===
Anjō was elevated to city status on May 3, 1952. On April 1, 1967, it annexed the neighboring town of Sakurai.

== Government ==
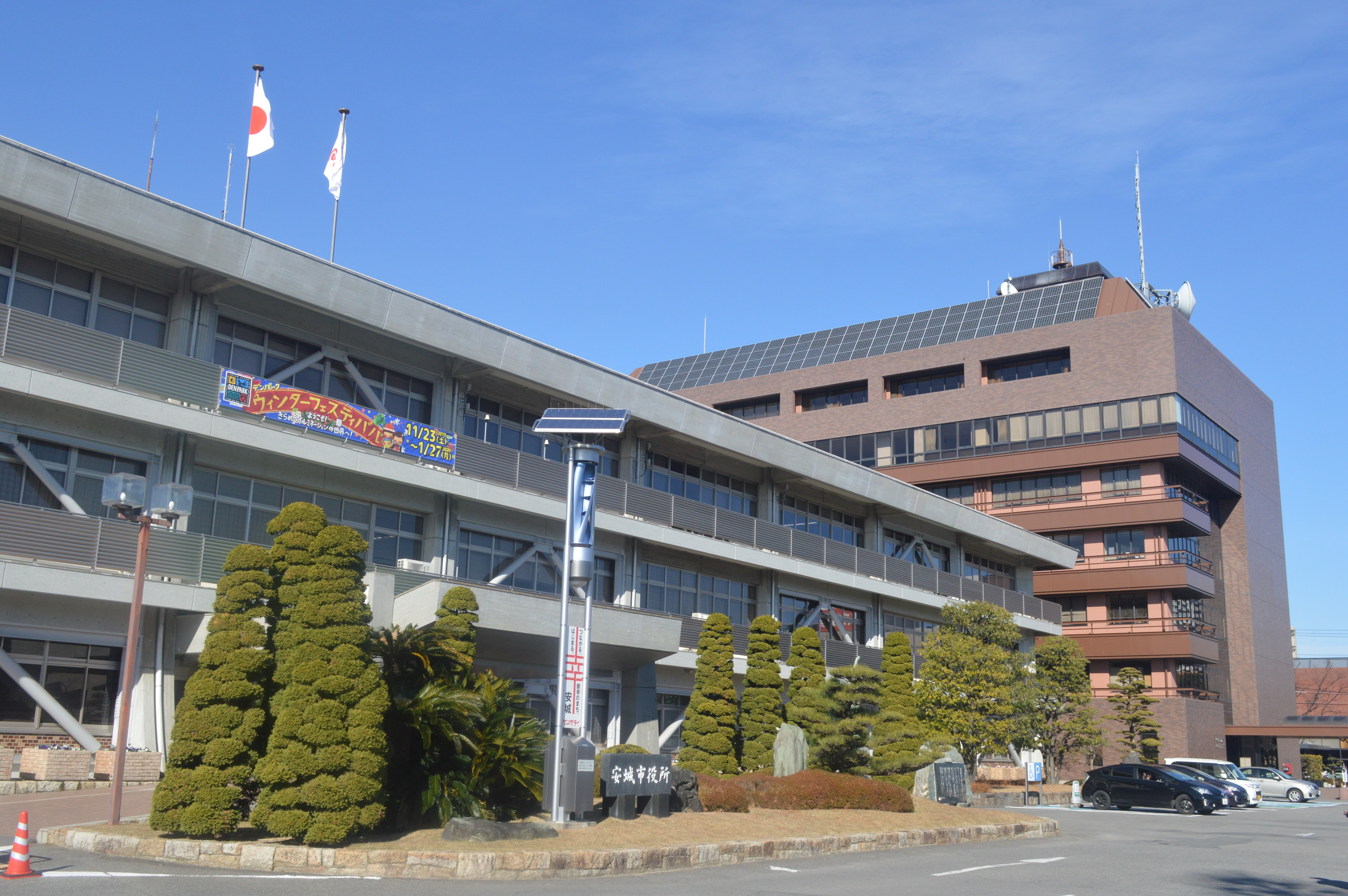
Anjo City Hall

Anjō has a mayor-council form of government with a directly elected mayor and a unicameral city legislature of 28 members. The city contributes two members to the Aichi Prefectural Assembly. In terms of national politics, the city is part of Aichi District 13 of the lower house of the Diet of Japan.

== Economy ==
Anjō is a regional commercial center with a mixed economy of manufacturing and agriculture.

=== Primary sector of the economy ===
==== Agriculture ====
In addition to rice, wheat, and soybeans, notable agricultural products include figs, Japanese pears, and cucumbers.

=== Secondary sector of the economy ===
==== Manufacturing ====
Due to its proximity to the various factories of Toyota in neighboring Toyota City, Anjō is host to many factories supplying components into the automobile industry.

=== Companies headquartered in Anjō ===
- Aisin AW, automotive components
- Anden, automotive components
- Central Motor Wheel, automotive components
- Hekikai Shinkin Bank
- Makita, power tools, founded in Anjō, 1915.
- Sugi Holdings, pharmaceuticals
- Tosho Holdings, real estate
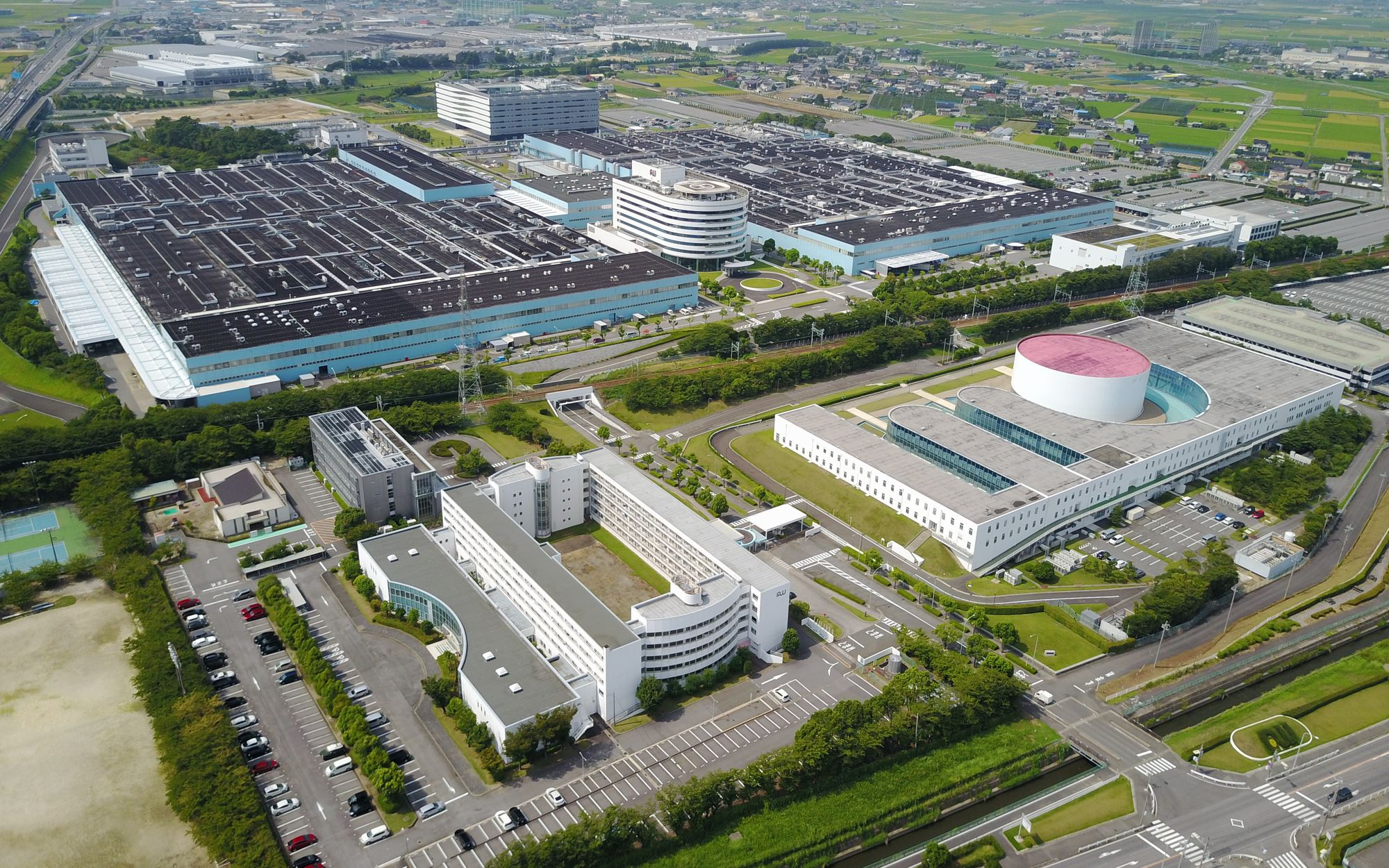
The headquarters of AISIN AW

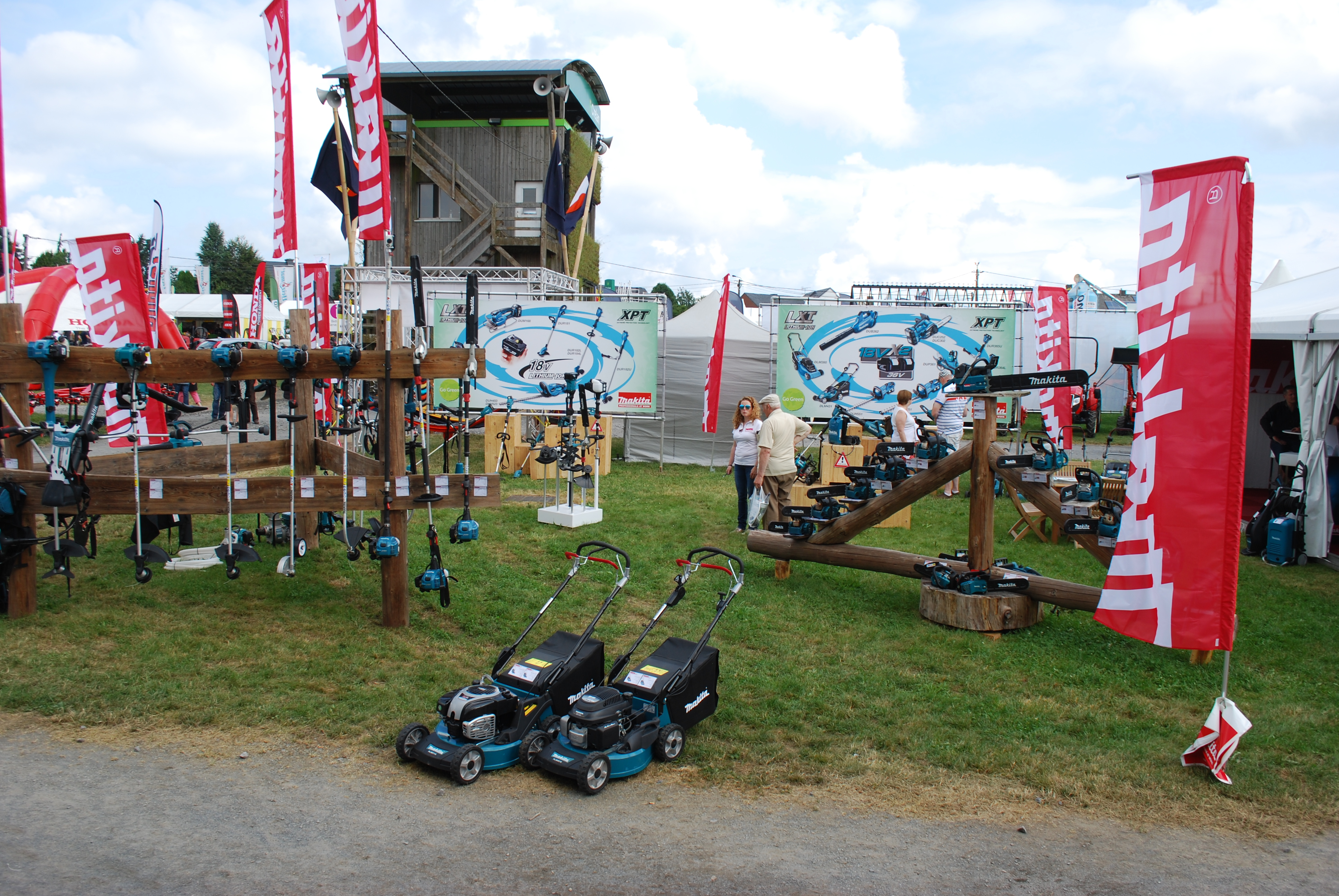
Makita lawn mowers

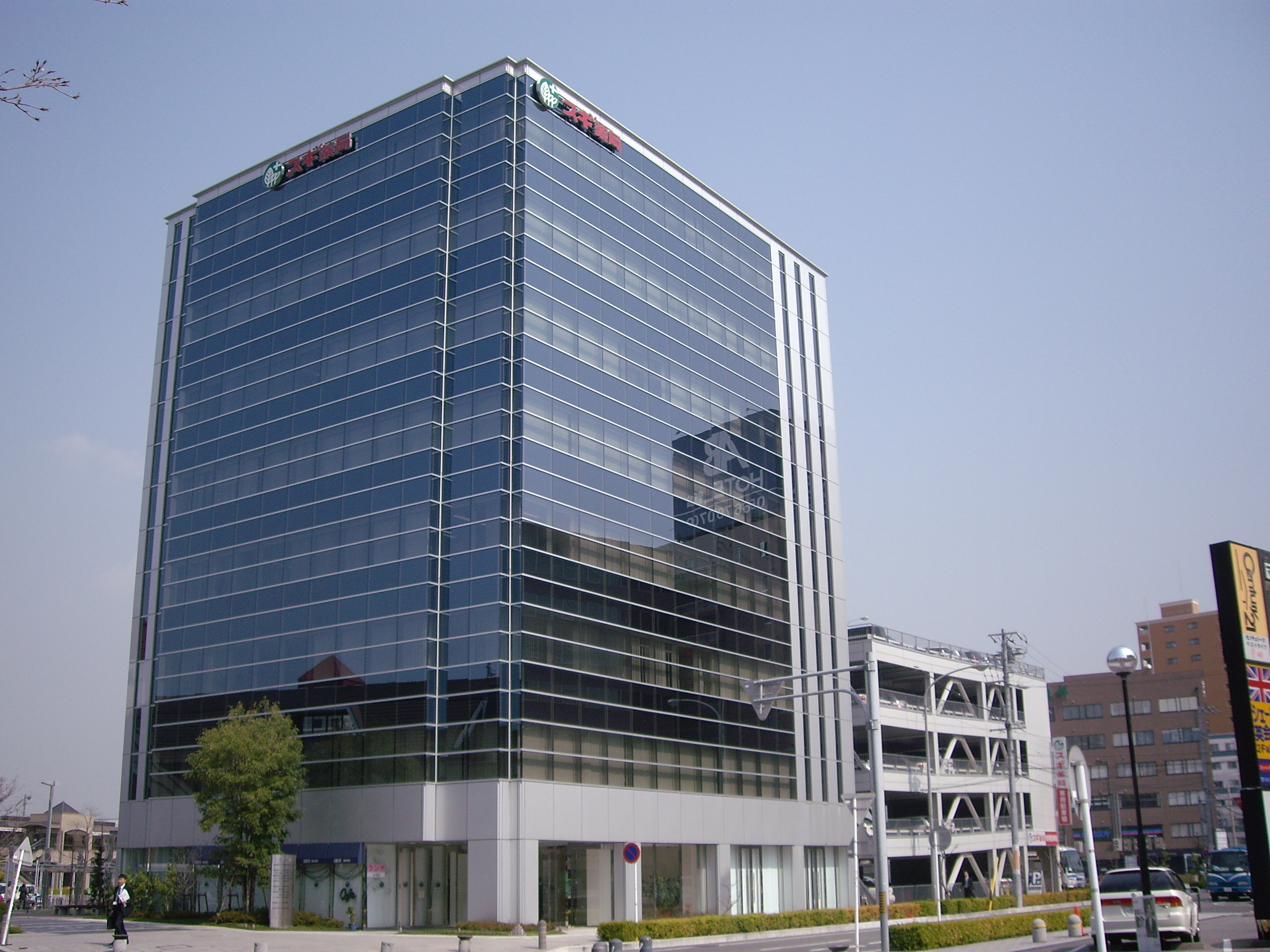
Sugi Pharmacy headquarters

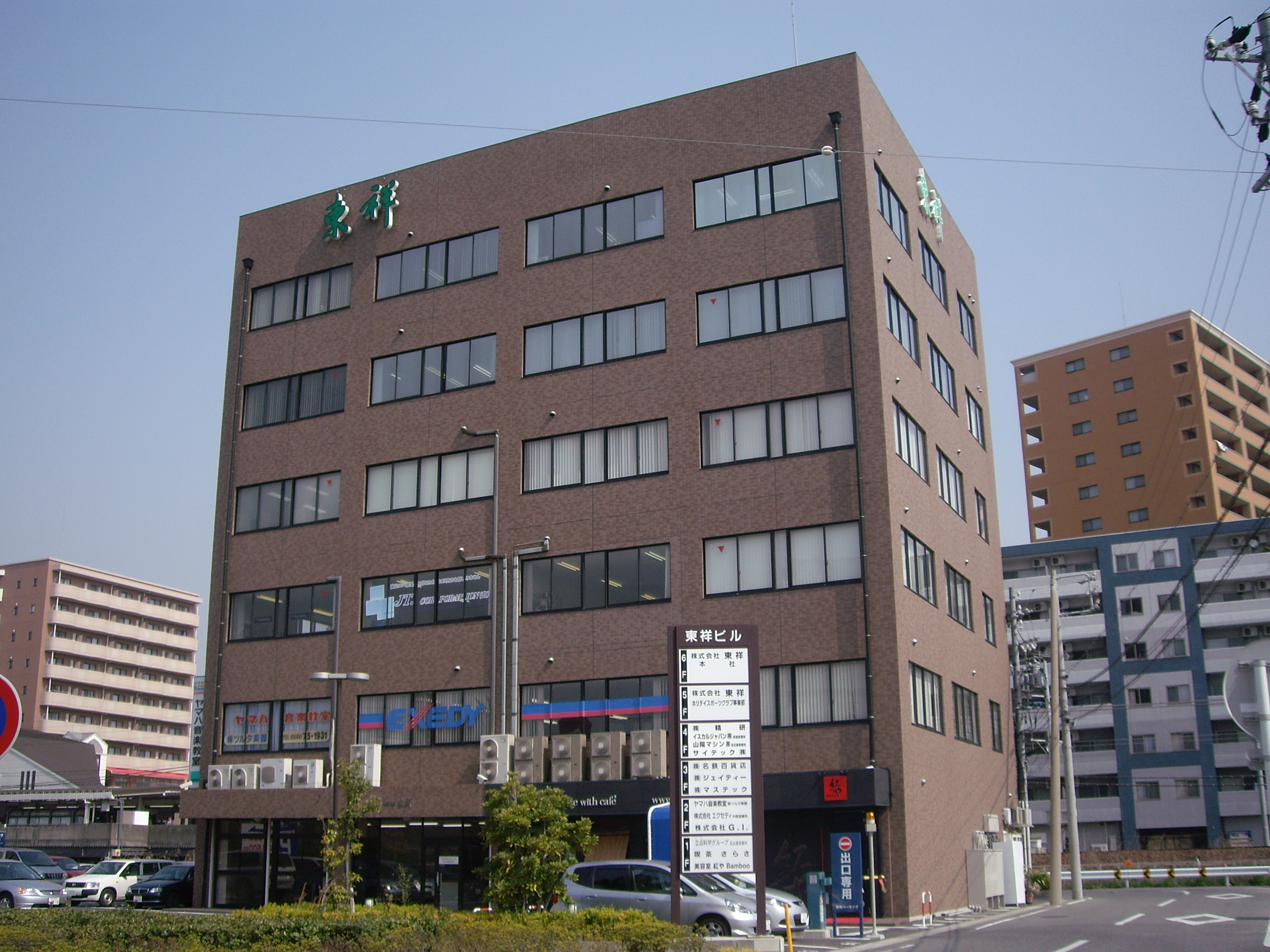
Tosho Building

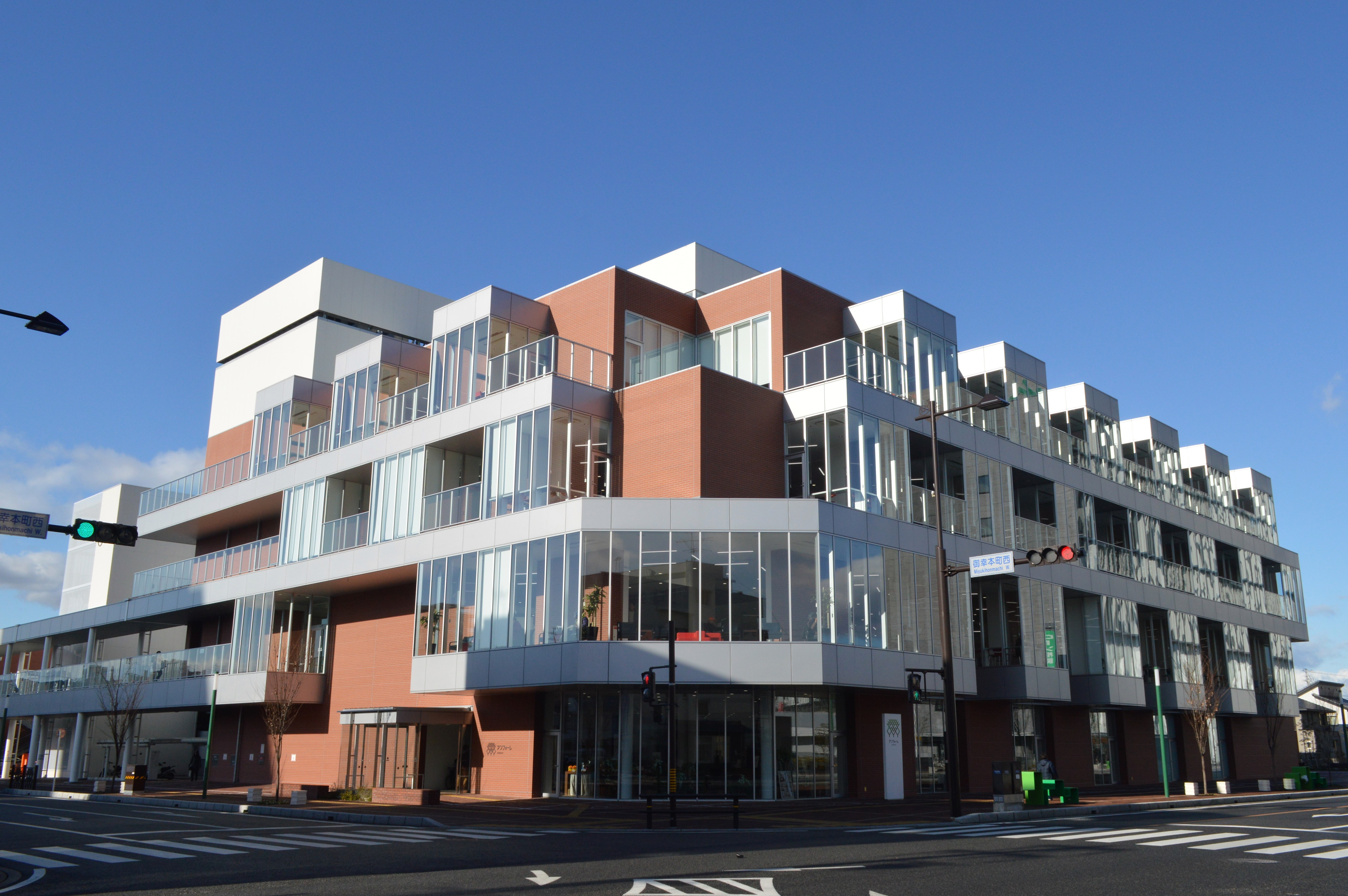
Anforet main building

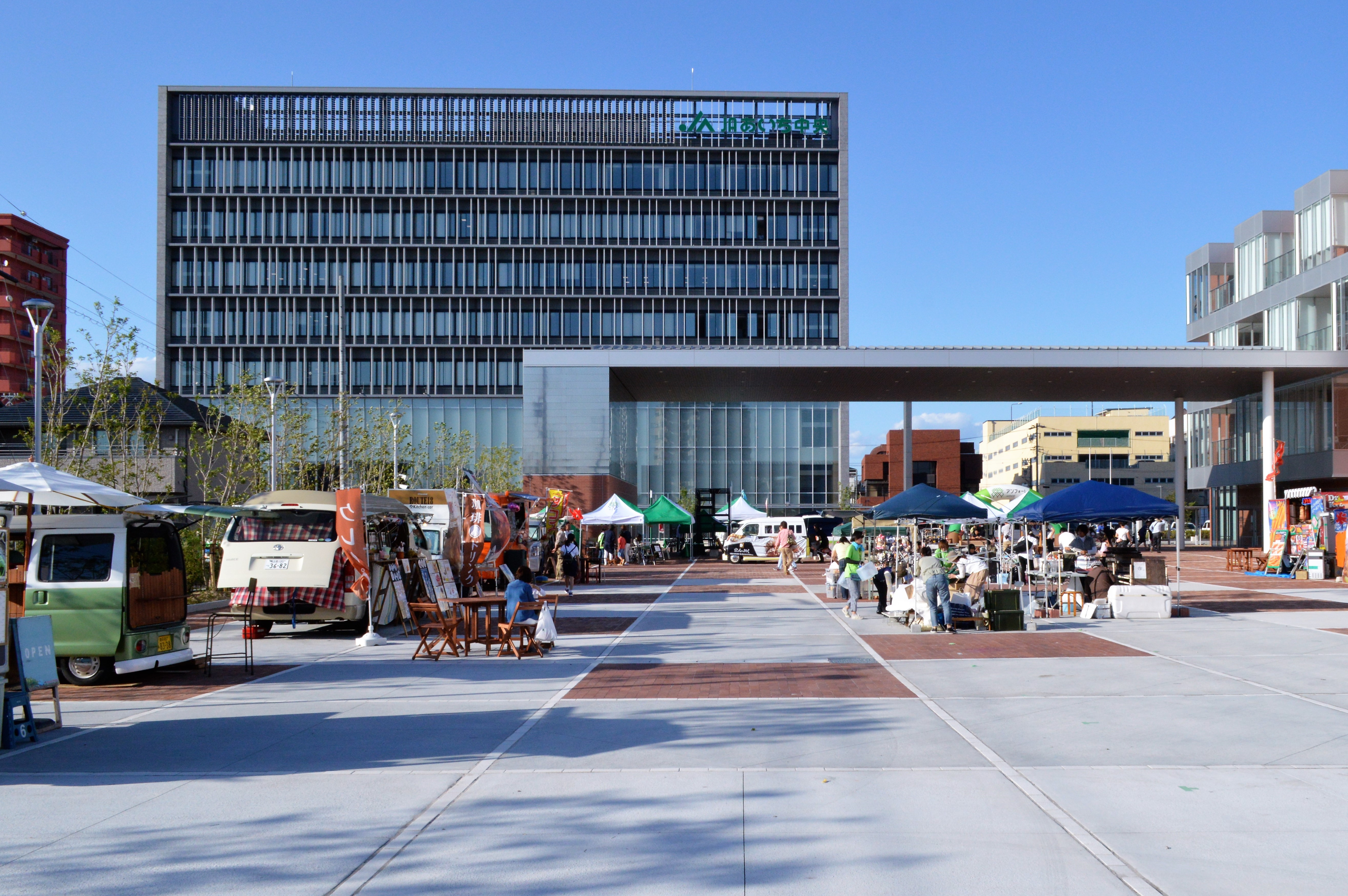
Anforet outdoor plaza

== Education ==
=== Schools ===
Primary and secondary education

- Anjō has 21 public elementary schools and eight public middle schools operated by the city government. The city has four public high schools operated by the Aichi Prefectural Board of Education. In addition the prefecture operates one special education school for the handicapped.

=== International schools ===
- Escola São Paulo – Brazilian school (Ensinos Fundamental e Médio)

=== Professional development school ===
- Denso Technical Skills Academy

== Transportation ==
=== Railways ===
The Tōkaidō Shinkansen stops at Mikawa-Anjō Station, but Anjō Station on the Tōkaidō Main Line and Shin Anjō Station on the Meitetsu Nagoya Main Line and Nishio Line serve the commercial center of the city.

==== High-speed rail ====
Central Japan Railway Company

- Tōkaidō Shinkansen: - Mikawa-Anjō

==== Conventional lines ====
Central Japan Railway Company

- Tōkaidō Main Line: - Anjō – Mikawa-Anjō

Meitetsu

- Nagoya Main Line: - Shin Anjō
- Nishio Line: - Shin Anjō – Kita Anjō – Minami Anjō – Hekikai Furui – Horiuchi Kōen – Sakurai – Minami Sakurai

=== Roads ===
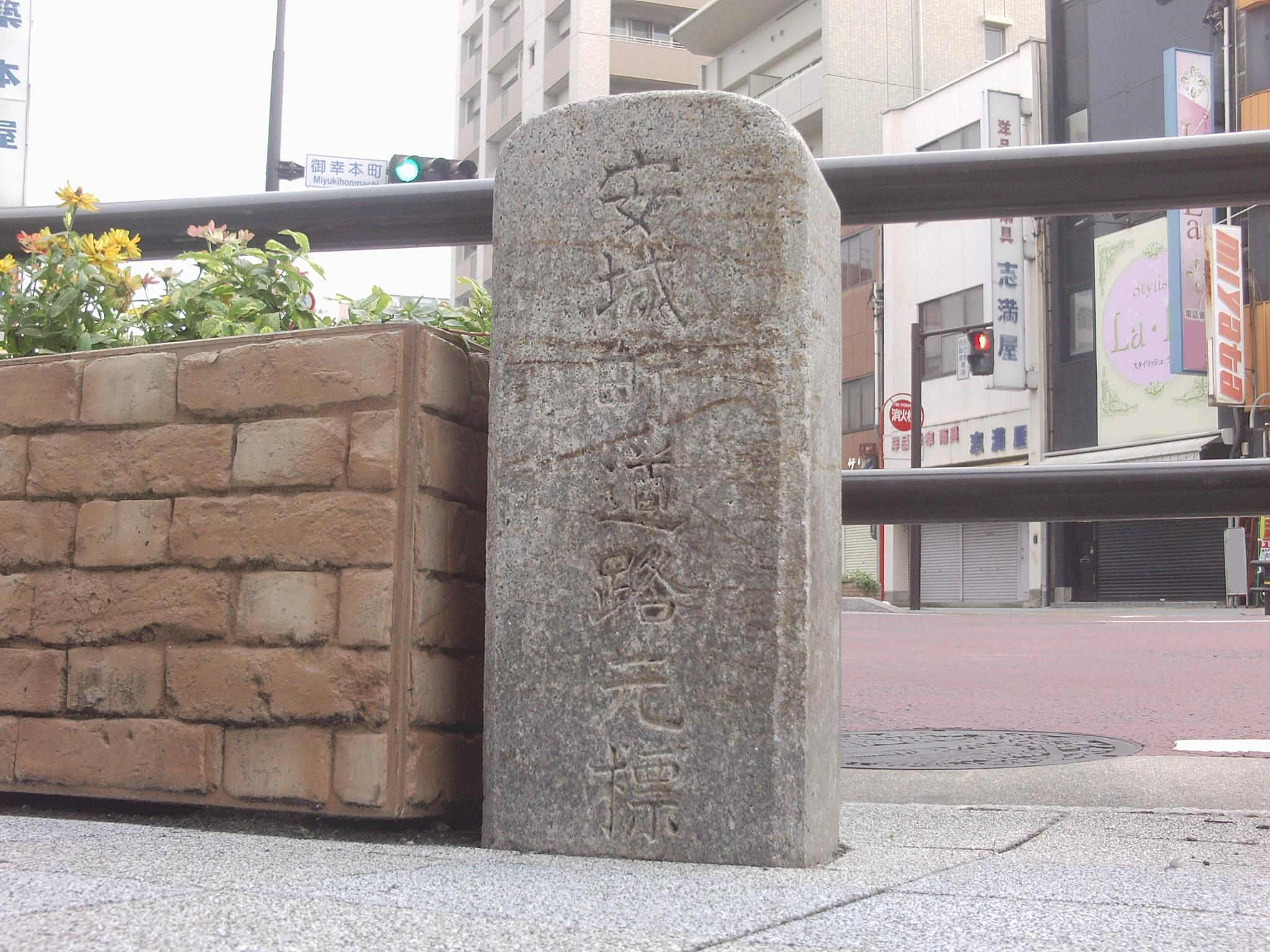
The Kilometre Zero of Anjō

==== Expressways ====
- Isewangan Expressway

==== Japan National Route ====
- National Route 1
- National Route 23
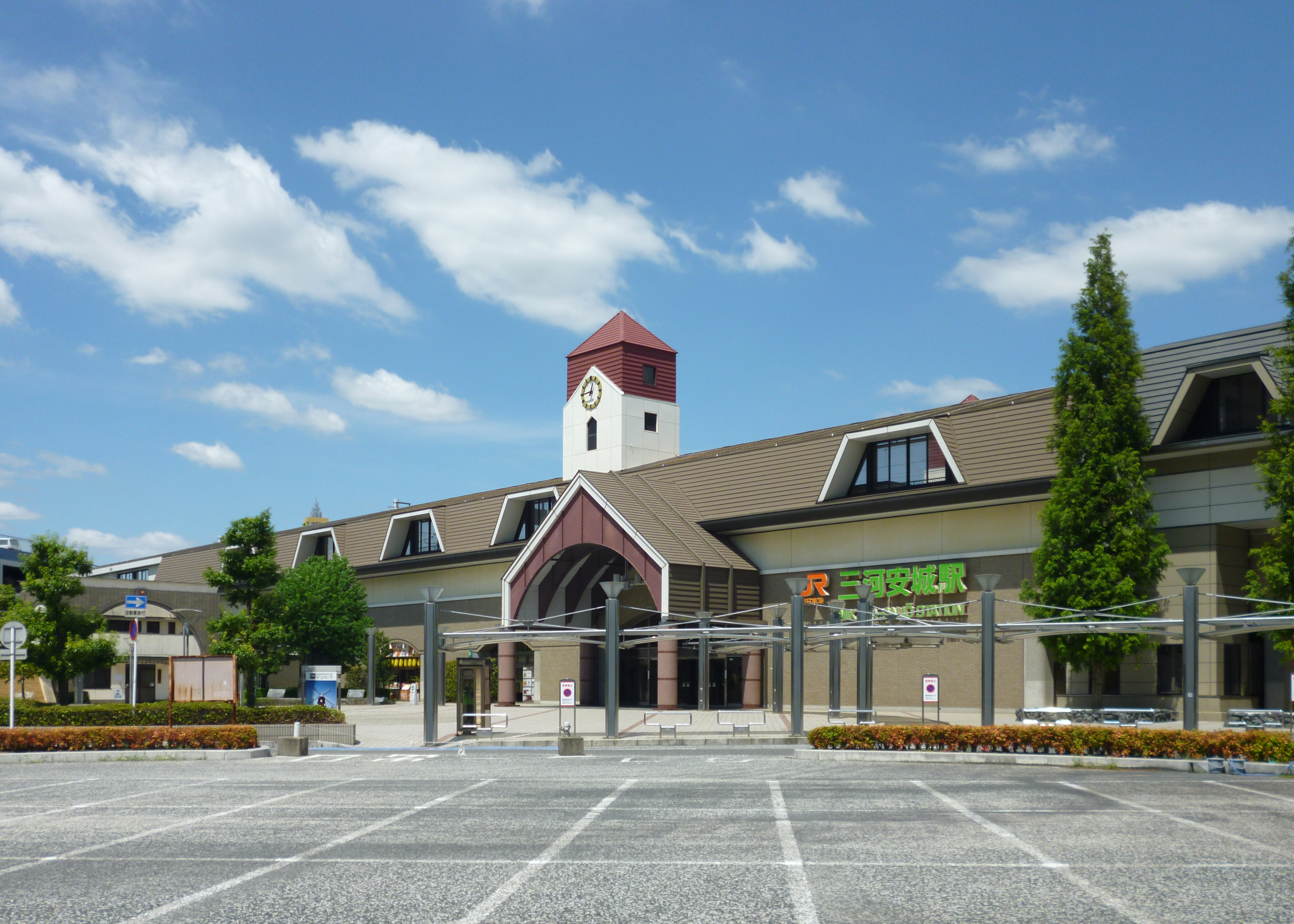
Mikawa-Anjō Station

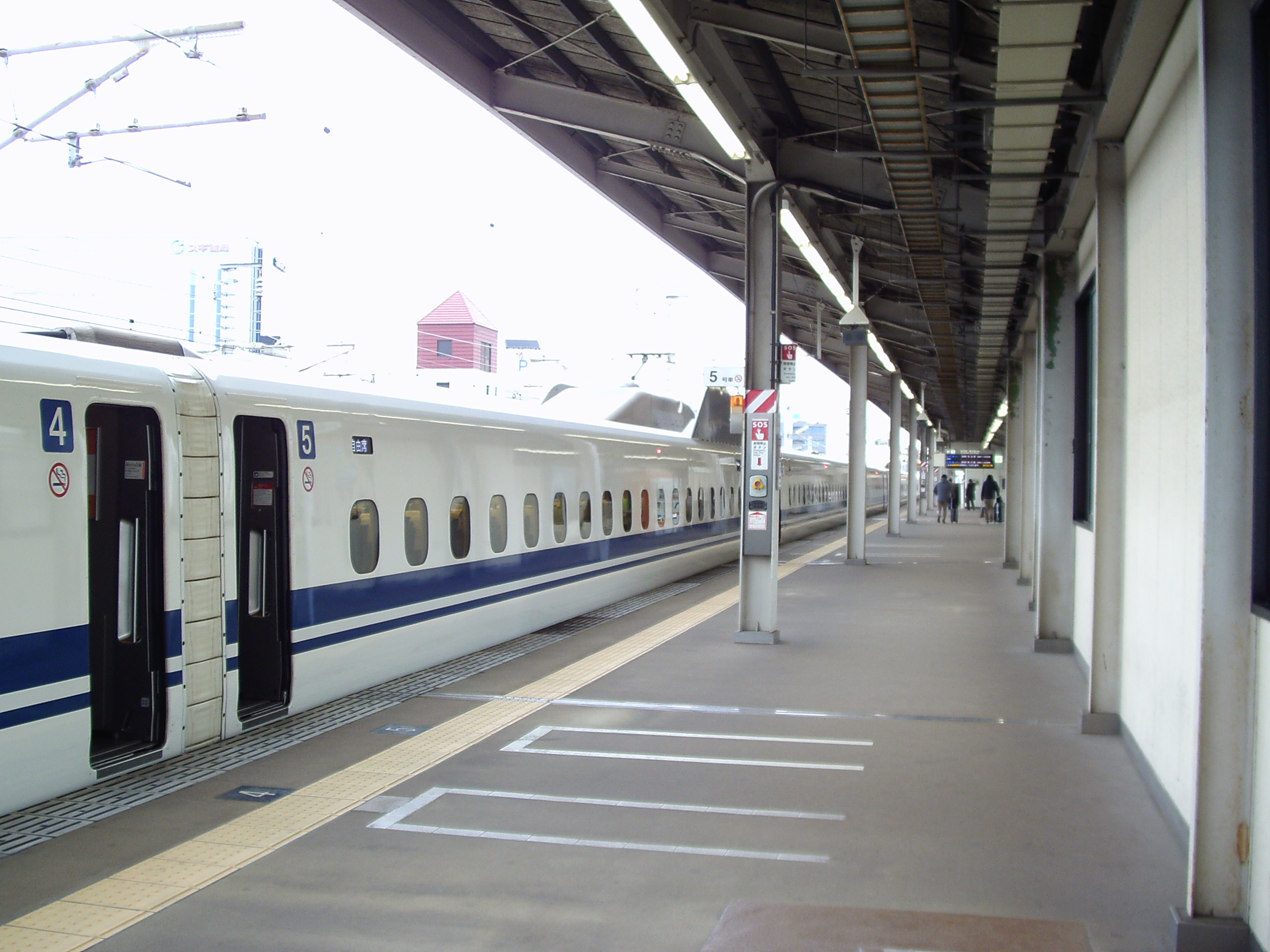
Tōkaidō Shinkansen

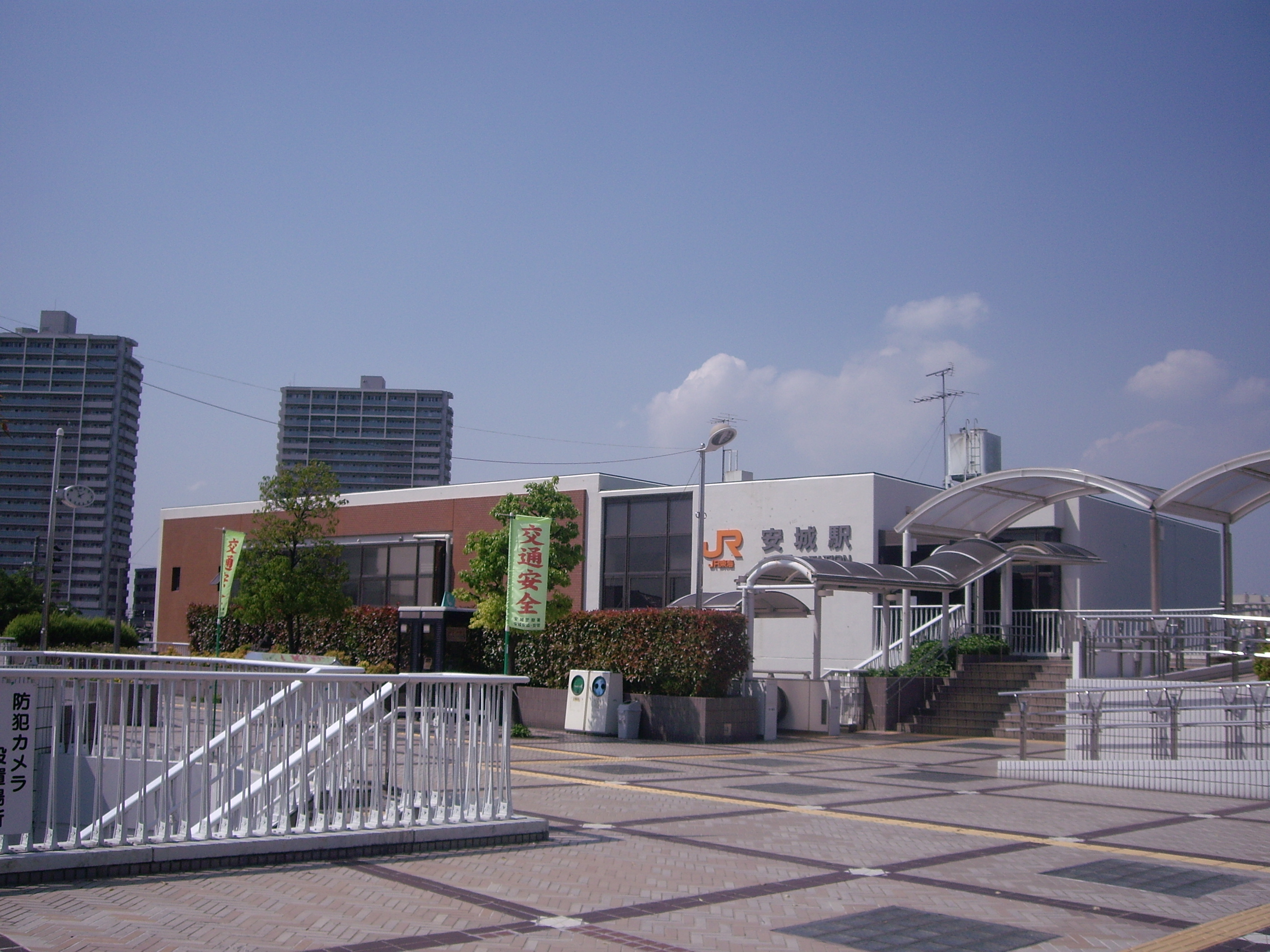
Anjo Station

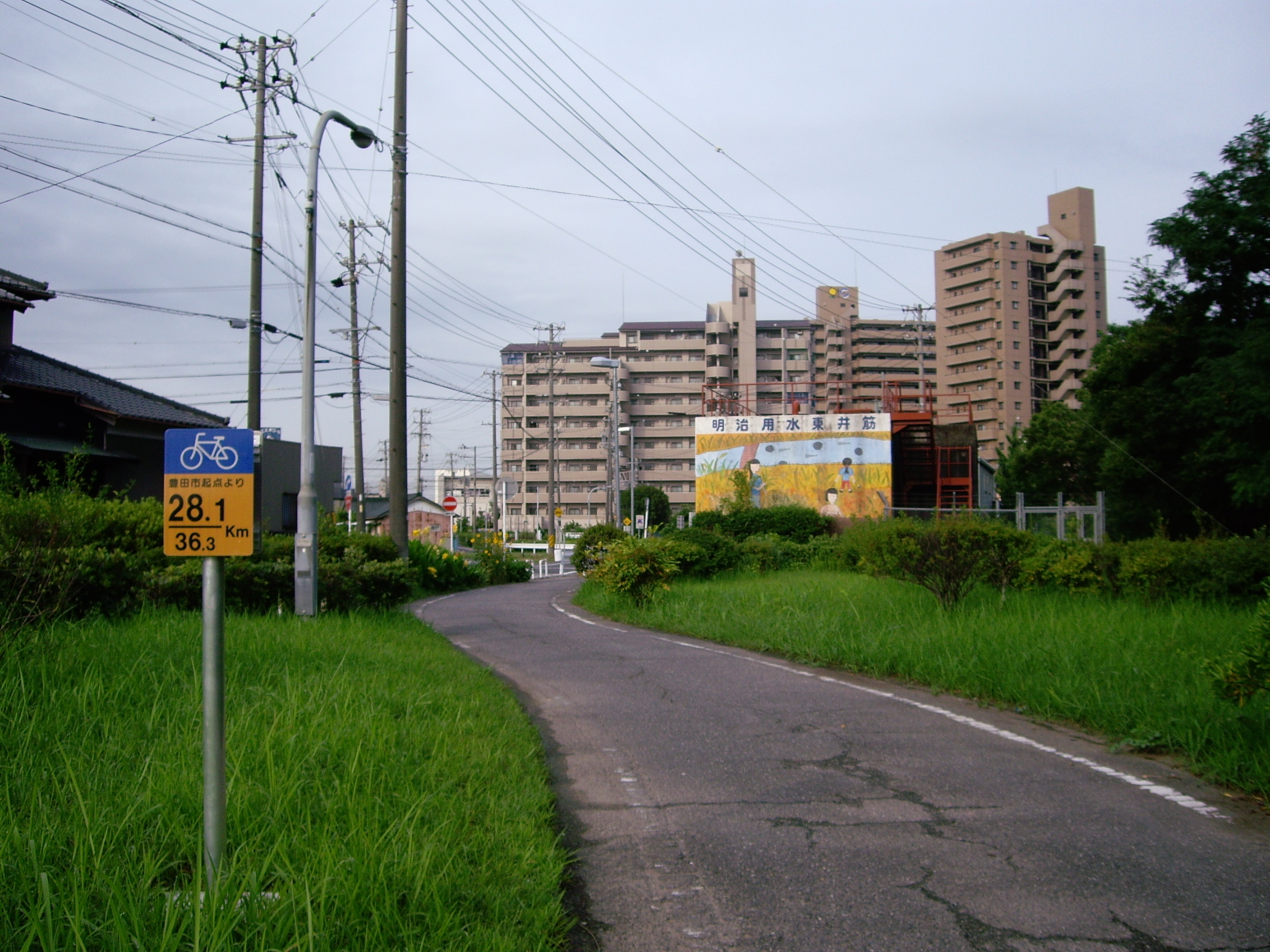
Cycling Road from Anjō to Toyota

== Sister cities ==
- Huntington Beach, California, United States, since July 4, 1992
- Hobsons Bay, Victoria, Australia, since October 15, 1994
- Kolding, Denmark, since January 21, 2009

== Local attractions ==
=== Tourist attraction ===
National Historic Sites

- Futago Kofun
- Himeogawa Kofun
- Honshōji – Buddhist temple that was the site of the Battle of Azukizaka (1564)

Other historical sites

- Anjō Castle – Site of Anjo Castle, built in 1480, destroyed in 1562
- Anjō shrine
- Meijigawa Shrine
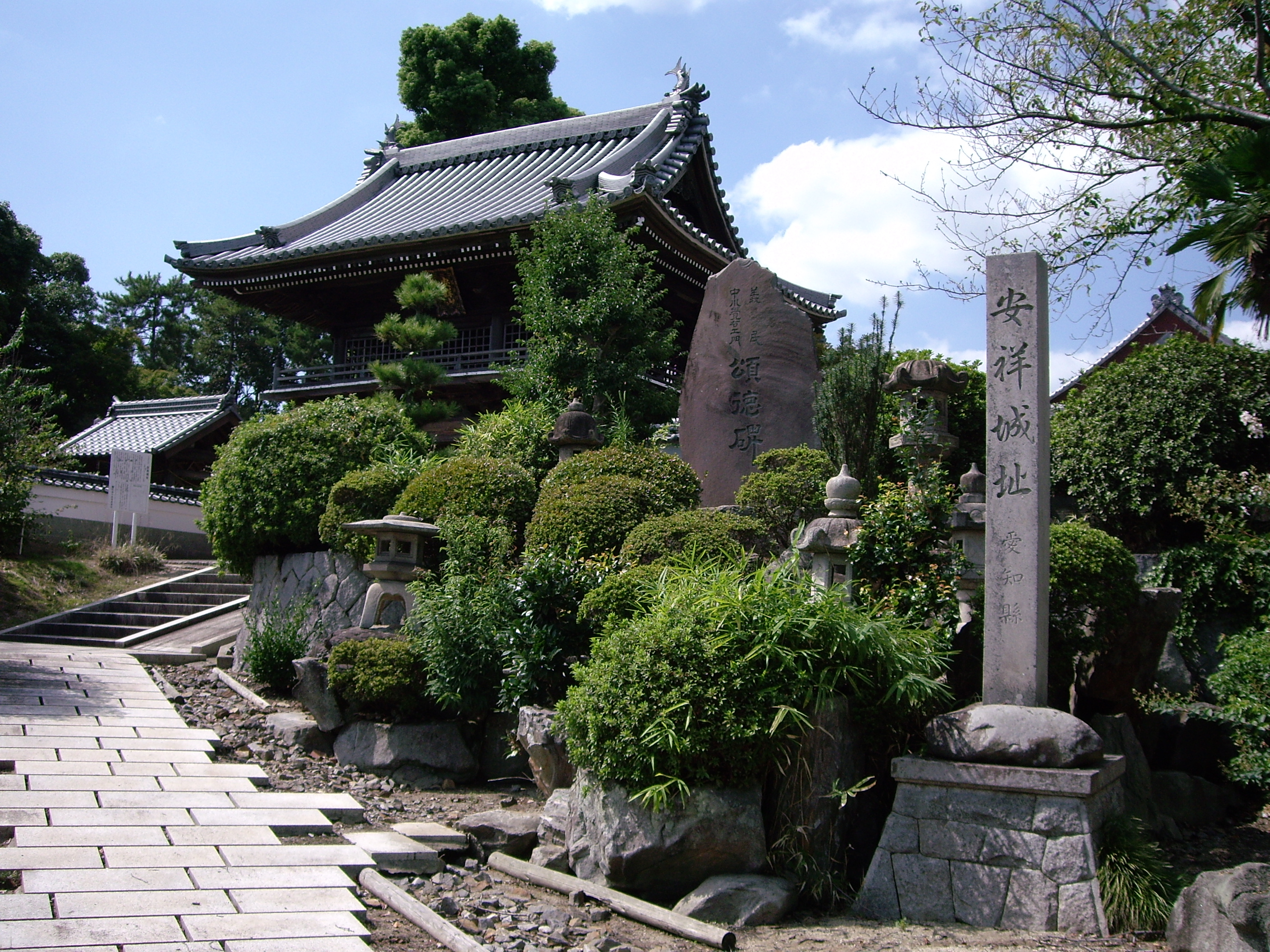
Anjō Castle

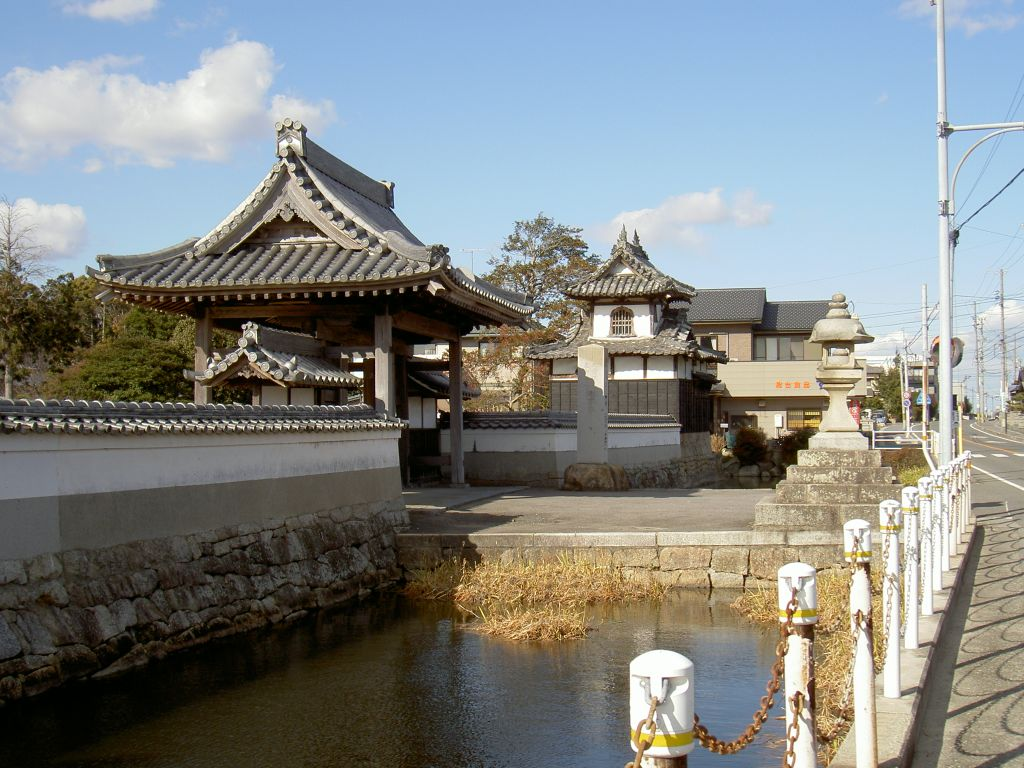
Honshōji temple

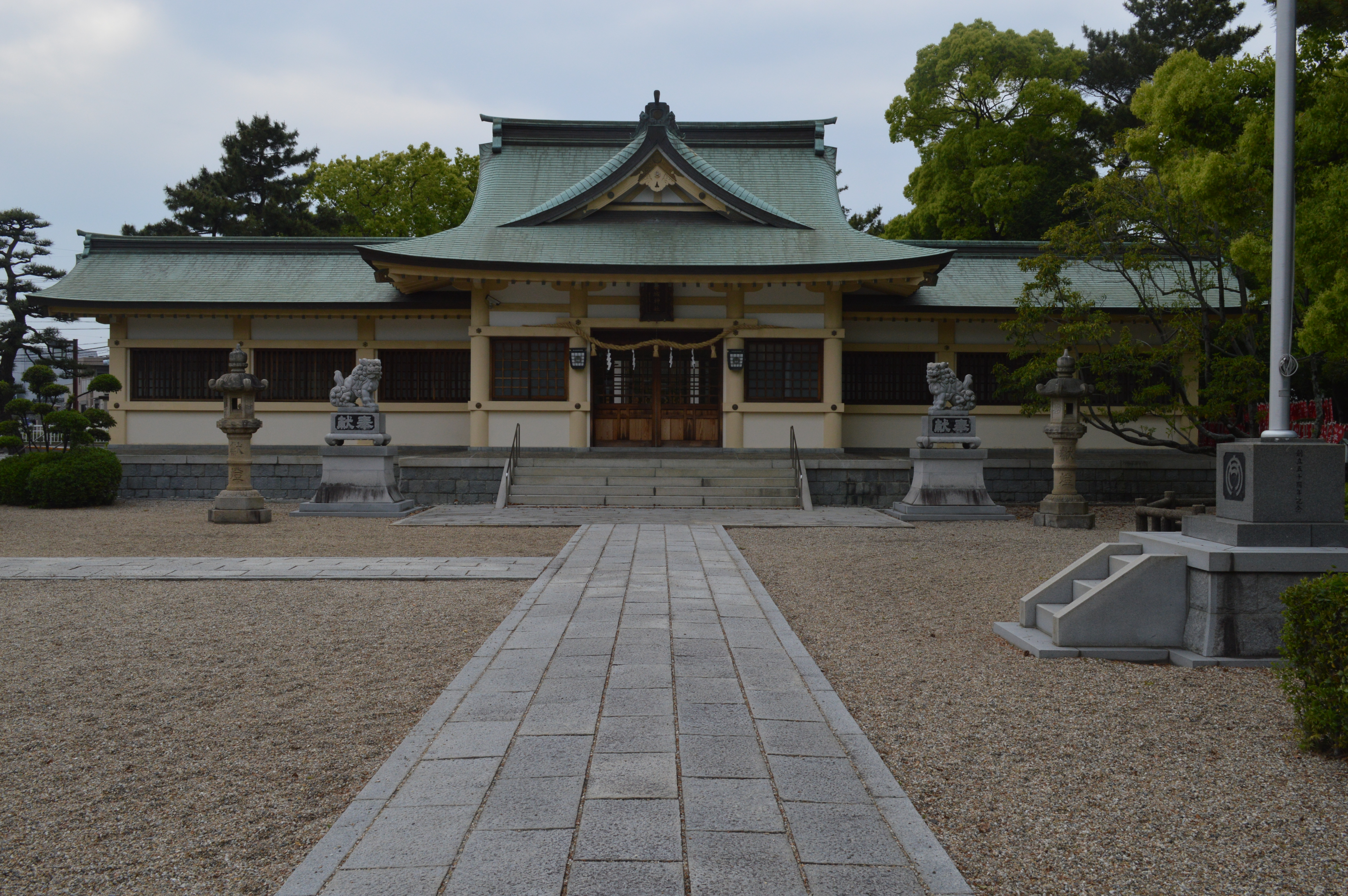
Anjō shrine

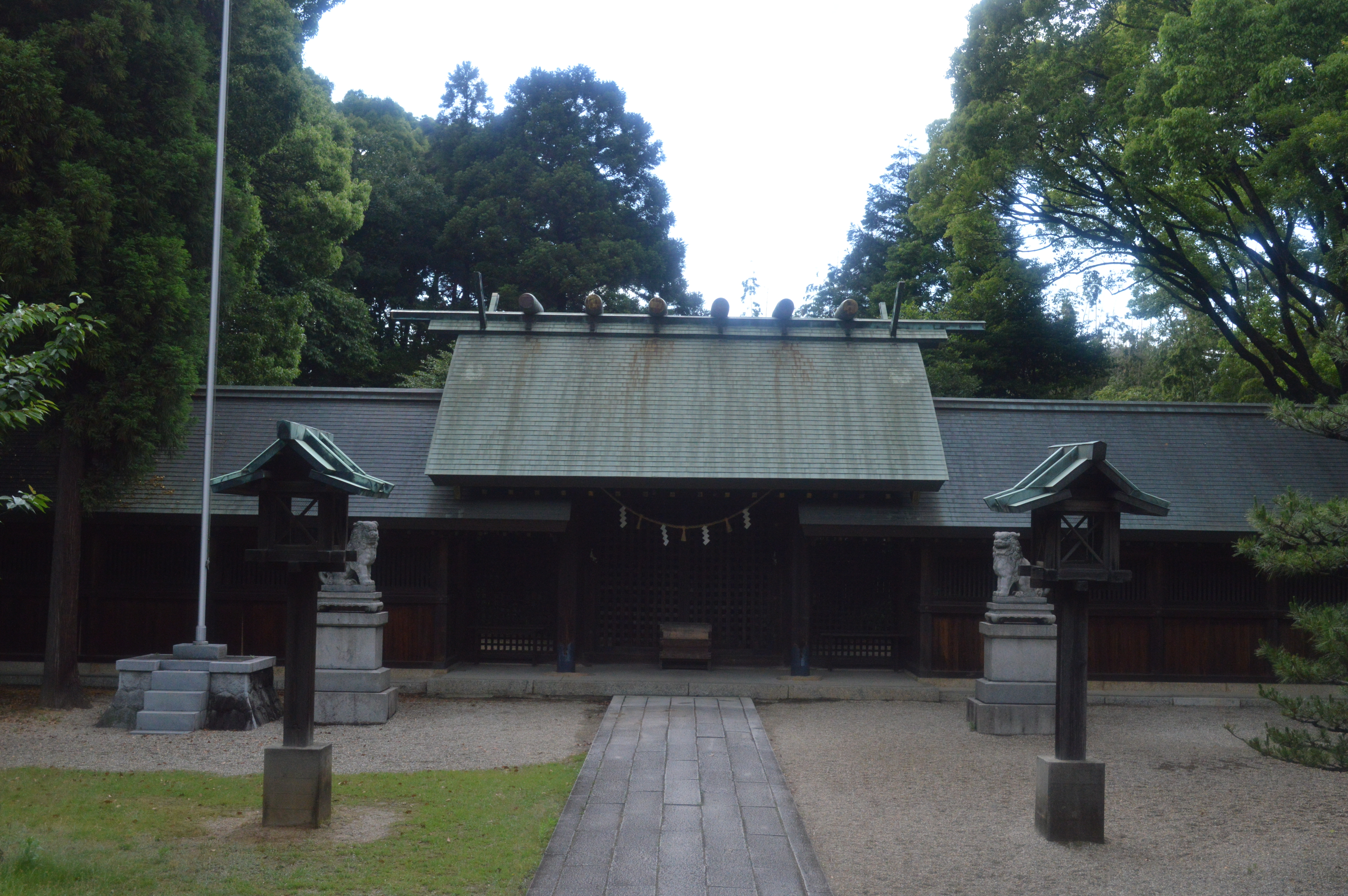
Meijigawa Shrine

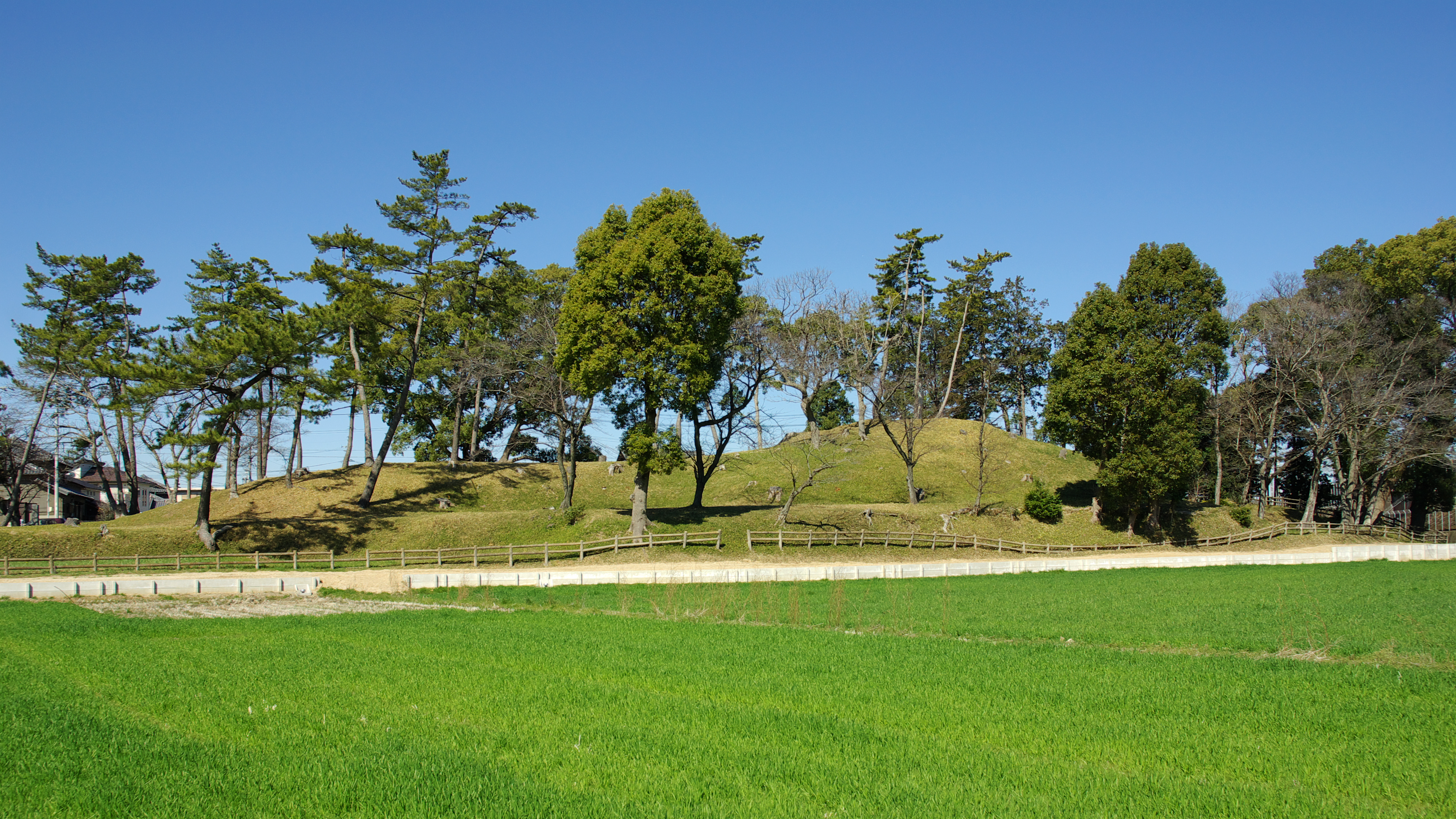
Futago Kofun

Parks

- Den Park
- Horiuchi Park
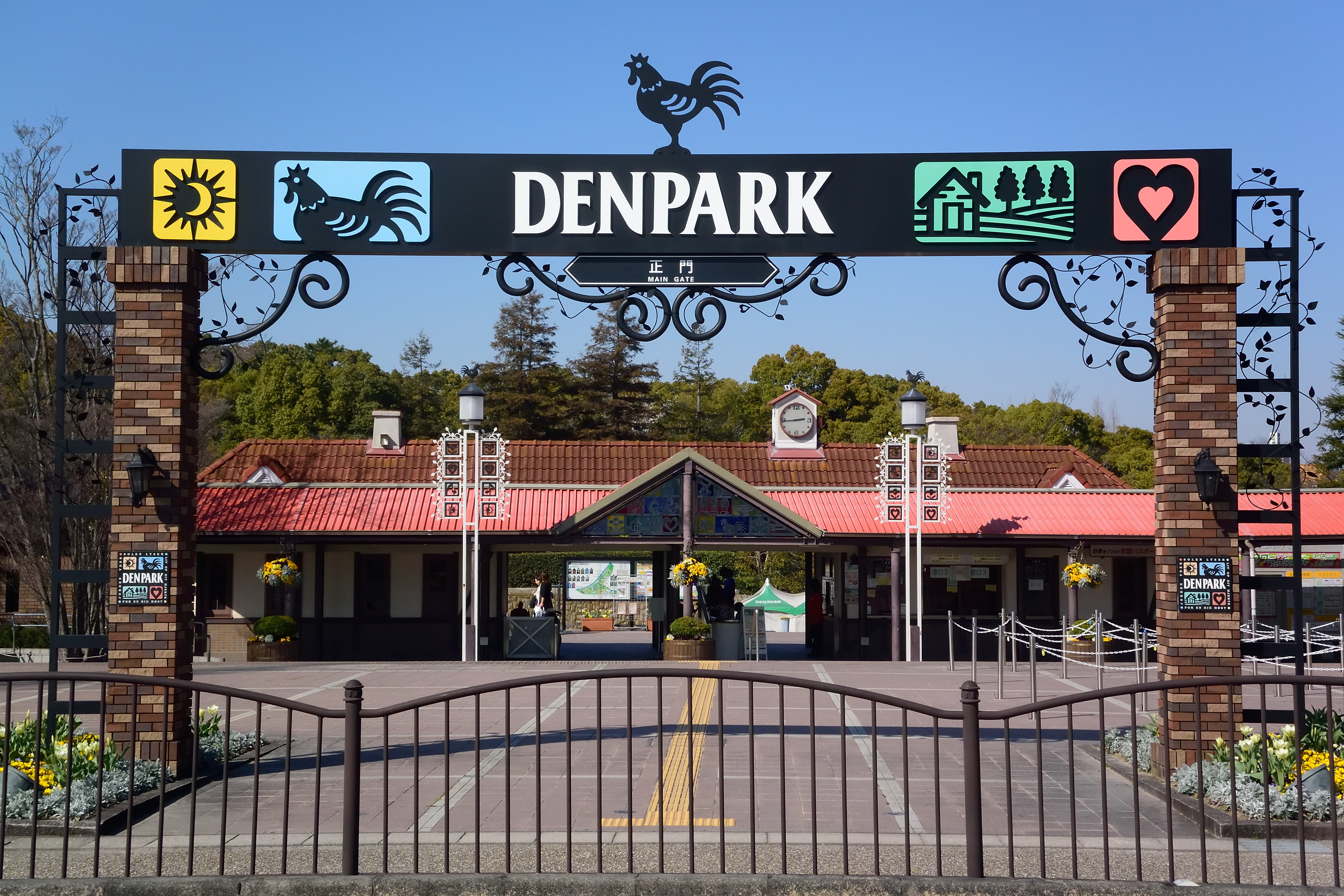
Den Park

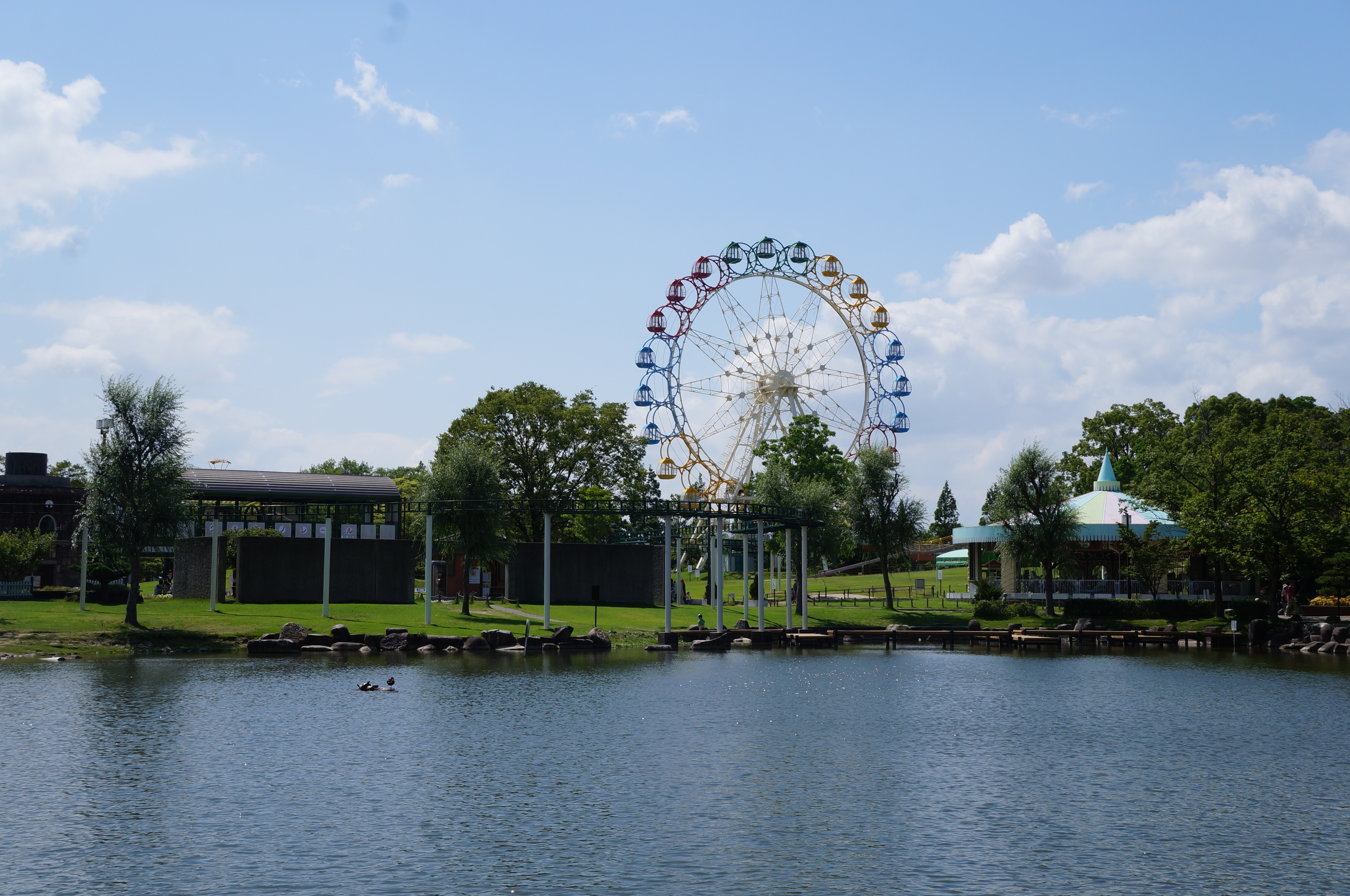
Horiuchi Park

== Culture ==
=== Festival ===
- Anjo Tanabata Festival

=== Sports ===
Sex	Name	competition	League	Home	Sponsor	Since
Men	Aisin Areions	Basketball	B.League (B3)	Aisin AW Gymnasium･Anjō City Gymnasium	Aisin	1978
Women	Denso Bright Pegasus	Softball	Japan Softball League (JSL)	Anjo Sports Park Softball Field	Denso	1960
Women	Aisin Wings	Basketball	W.League	Aisin AW Gymnasium･Anjō City Gymnasium	Aisin	1979

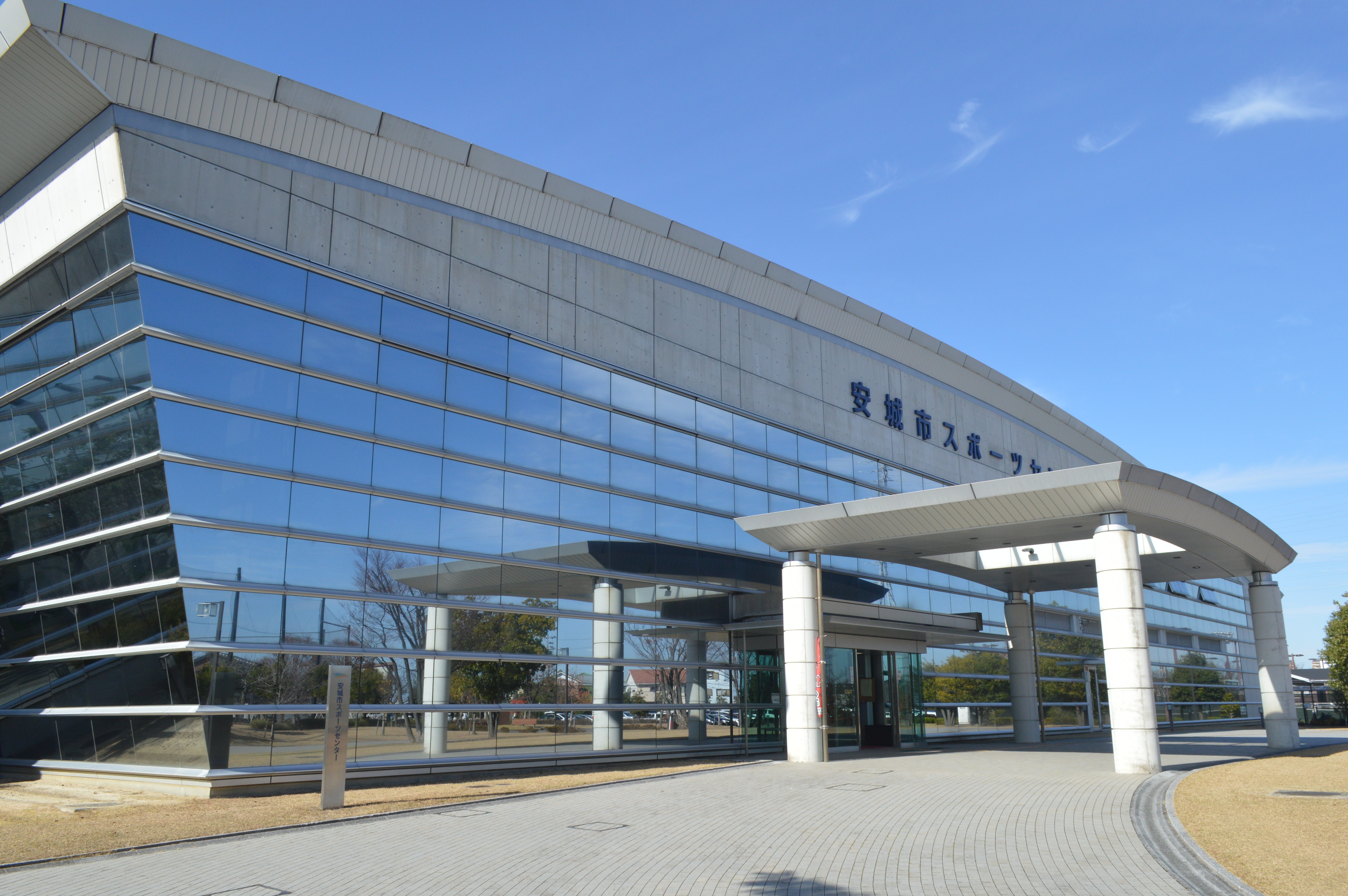
Anjō City Gymnasium

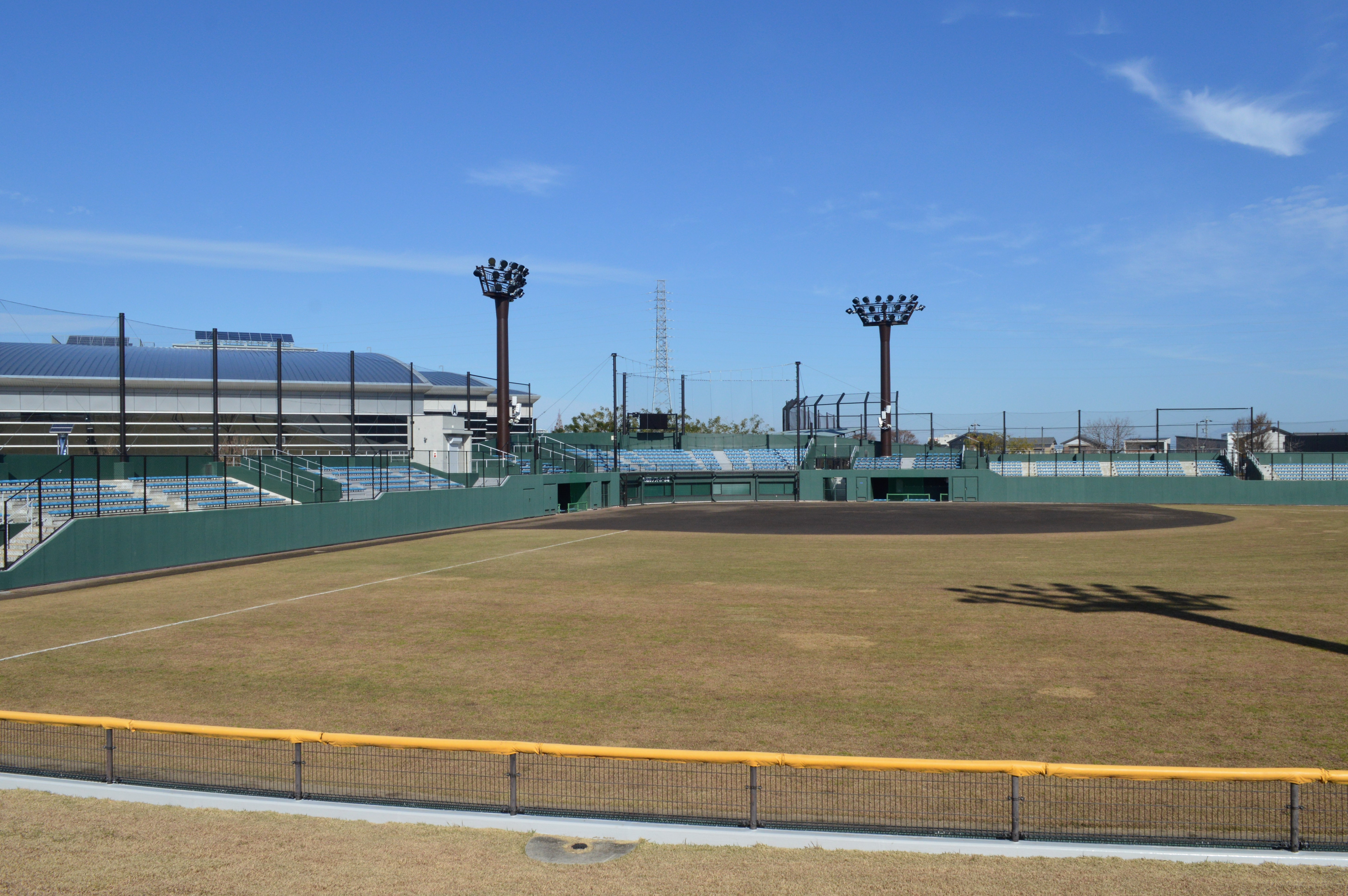
Anjo Sports Park Softball Field

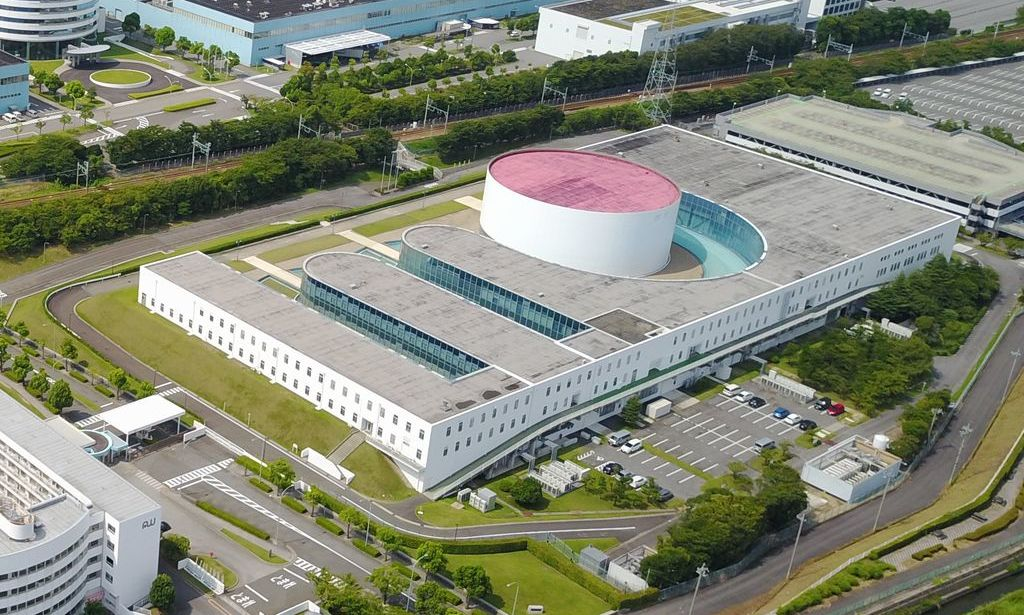
Aisin AW Gymnasium

== Notable people ==
- Tohru Fukuyama, organic chemist
- Tsuneko Gauntlett, suffrage, and peace activist
- Toshiya Kakiuchi, businessman
- Tam Nakano (Real Name: Yuria Tauchi, Nihongo: 田内 友里愛, Tauchi Yuria), professional wrestler
- Kazuchika Okada, professional wrestler
- Ayumi Tanimoto, Olympic gold-medalist judo wrestler
- Goiti Yamauchi, Japanese Brazilian Mixed martial artist
- Ryōka Yuzuki, voice actress
