= Mikawa-Anjō Station =

Railway station in Anjō, Aichi Prefecture, Japan

CA55 Mikawa-Anjō Station 三河安城駅
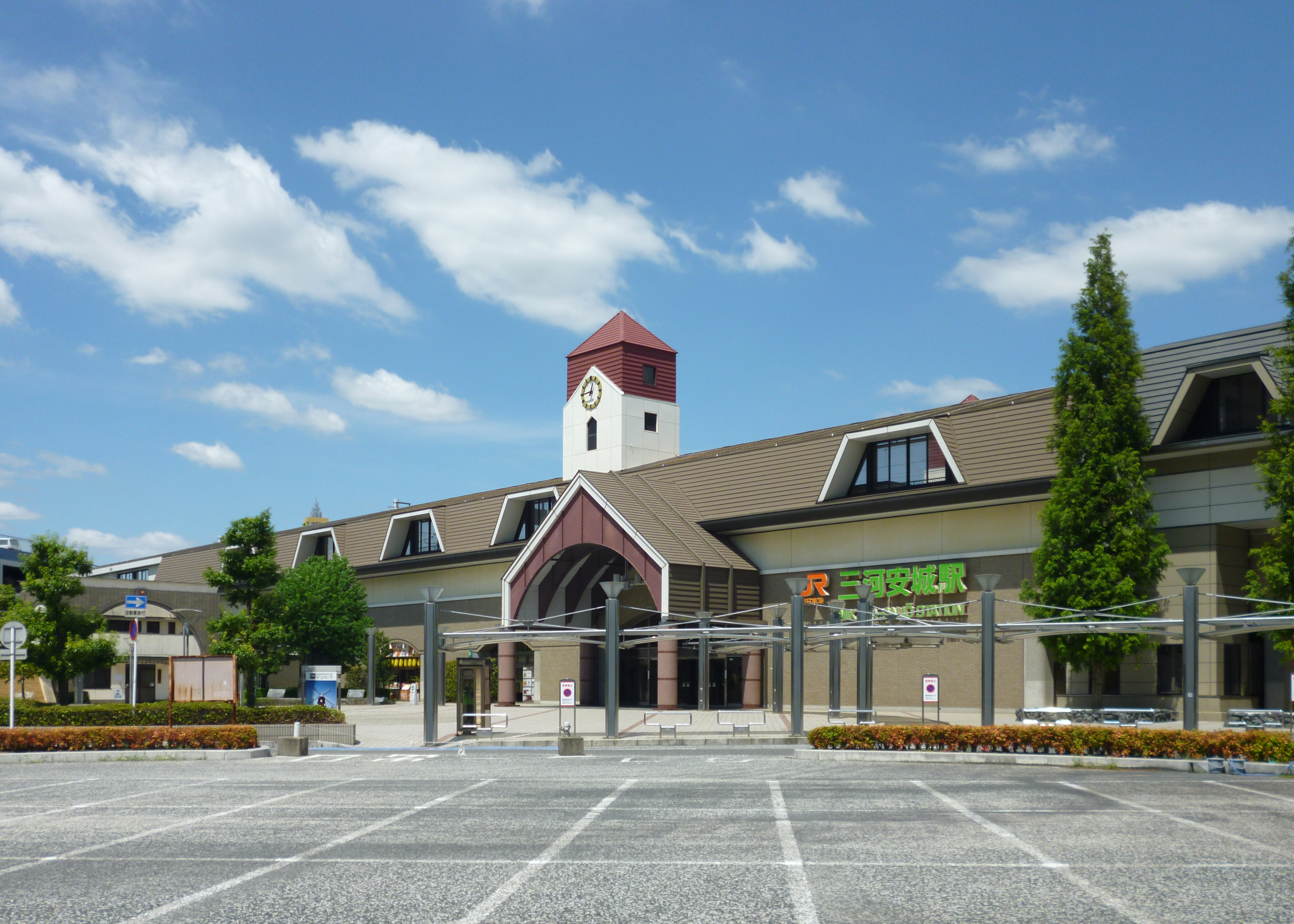
- Mikawa-Anjō Station, August 2017

General information
- Location: 1-17-1 Mikawa-Anjō; Anjō, Aichi; Japan
- Coordinates: 34°58′08″N 137°03′38″E
- Operator: JR Central
- Lines: Tōkaidō Shinkansen; Tōkaidō Main Line
- Distance: 336.3 km (209.0 mi) from Tokyo
- Platforms: 2 side platforms (Shinkansen); 2 side platforms (conventional)
- Tracks: 4 (Shinkansen); 2 (conventional)

Construction
- Structure type: Elevated (Shinkansen); At grade (conventional)

Other information
- Status: Staffed
- Station code: CA55
- Website: Official website

History
- Opened: 13 March 1988; 38 years ago

Passengers
- FY 2023: 3,432 daily (Shinkansen); 13,205 daily (Tokaido Main Line)

Services
Preceding station	JR Central	Following station
Nagoya towards Shin-Ōsaka	Tōkaidō Shinkansen Kodama	Toyohashi towards Tokyo
Higashi-Kariya CA56 towards Maibara	Tōkaidō Main Line Local	Anjō CA54 towards Atami
Location
- Location within Aichi Prefecture Location within Japan

Mikawa-Anjō Station (Japanese: 三河安城駅, Hepburn: Mikawa-Anjō-eki) is a railway station in the city of Anjō, Aichi, Japan, operated by Central Japan Railway Company (JR Central).

== History ==
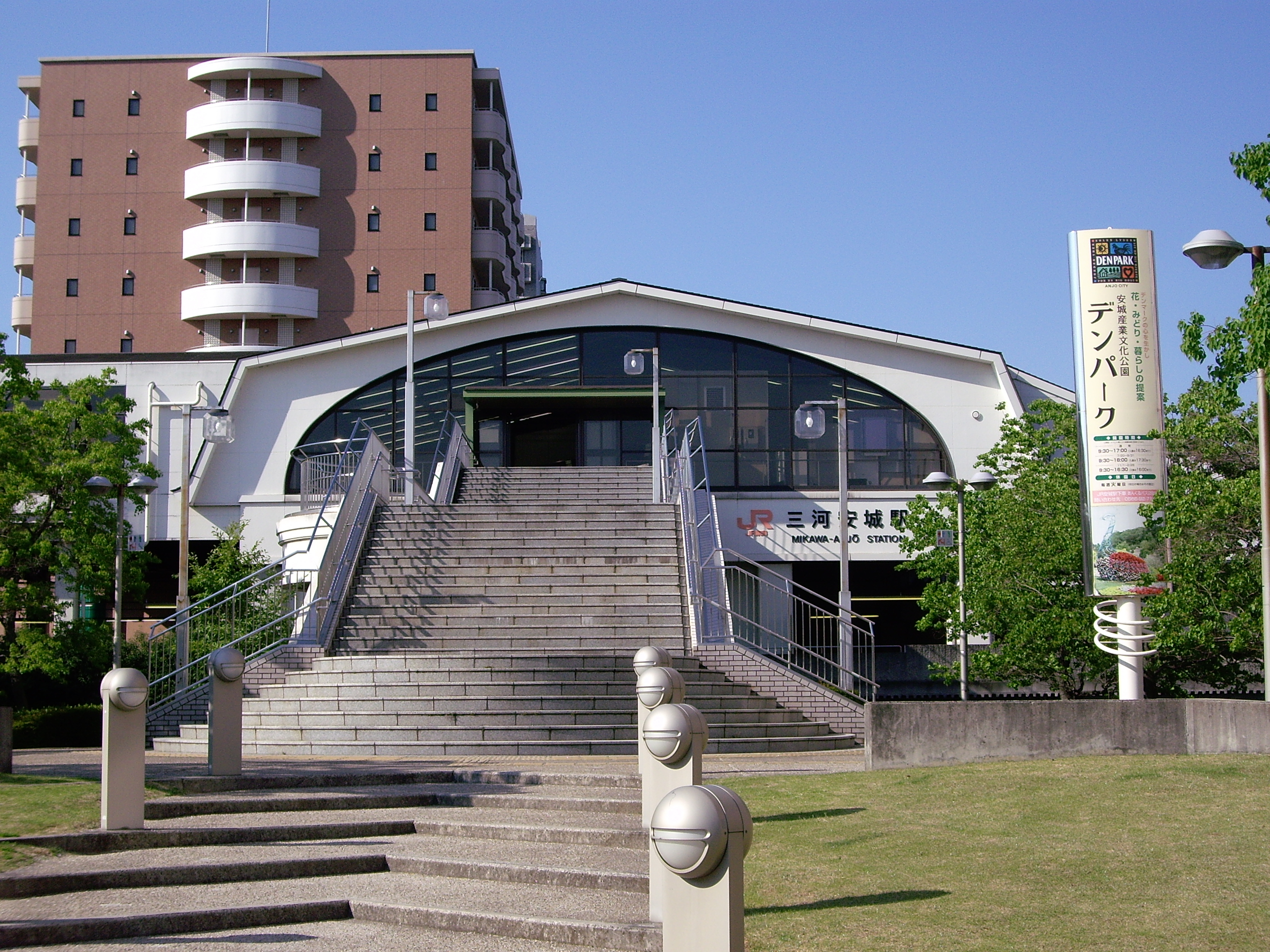
Tokaidō Main Line south gate

When the Tokaido Shinkansen opened, the distance between Toyohashi Station and Nagoya Station was the second-longest on the route of the line. In 1969, the mayors of Okazaki, Toyota, Anjō, Gamagōri, Nishio, Hekinan, Isshiki, Kira, Kōta, Hazu, Nukata, and Otowa submitted the petition of establishing Kokuteikōen-Mikawa Station (国定公園三河駅, Kokuteikōen-Mikawa-eki) in Kota.

These cities and towns formed the "Alliance for Mikawa Station". Kōta town subsequently recommended Ashinoya near Kōda Station. Okazaki city recommended Shōna-chō, Okazaki, Anjō city recommended Furui-chō near Hekikai Furui Station, and Nihongi-chō where the Tōkaidō Shinkansen and Tōkaidō Main Line intersect as possible candidate locations. The alliance entrusted the decision to the Aichi prefectural government. On January 5, 1984, the prefectural government decided to build the station in Nihongi, Anjō. Construction work started on July 29, 1985, and the station was opened on March 13, 1988.

Station numbering was introduced to the section of the Tōkaidō Line operated JR Central in March 2018; Mikawa-Anjō Station was assigned station number CA55.

== Station layout ==
The station has four opposed side platforms serving a total of four tracks. The Shinkansen platforms are located on passing loop tracks, allowing faster trains to pass on the two central tracks. The Shinkansen tracks are elevated, and the Tōkaidō line tracks cross underneath. The station building has automated ticket machines, TOICA automated turnstiles and a staffed ticket office.

=== Platforms ===
1	■ Tōkaidō Shinkansen	for Nagoya and Shin-Ōsaka
2	■ Tōkaidō Shinkansen	for Shizuoka and Tokyo
3	■ Tōkaidō Main Line	for Ōbu and Nagoya
4	■ Tōkaidō Main Line	for Okazaki and Toyohashi

== Services ==
Mikawa-Anjō Station is located at the intersection of two railway lines, Tokaido Shinkansen and Tōkaidō Main Line, and is located 336.3 kilometres (209.0 mi) from the starting point of the line at Tokyo Station. The station's location, Anjō is nicknamed the "Japanese Denmark".

== See also ==
- List of railway stations in Japan
