= Maki Eguchi =

Japanese basketball player

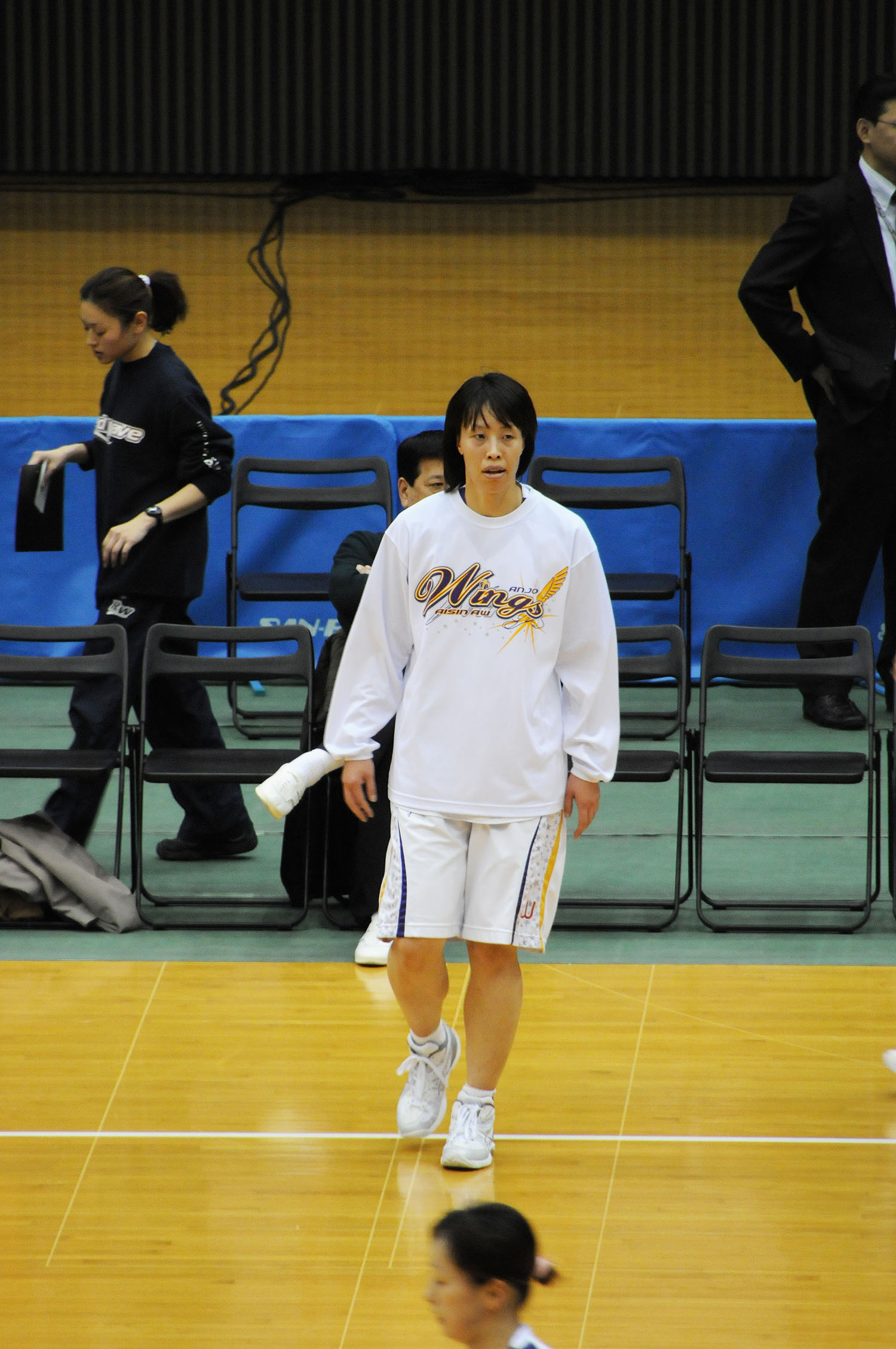
Maki Eguchi

Maki Eguchi (江口真紀, born 14 October 1978) is a Japanese former basketball player who competed in the 2004 Summer Olympics.
