= Anjō Sports Park =

Park in Anjo, Aichi, Japan

- 安城市総合運動公園
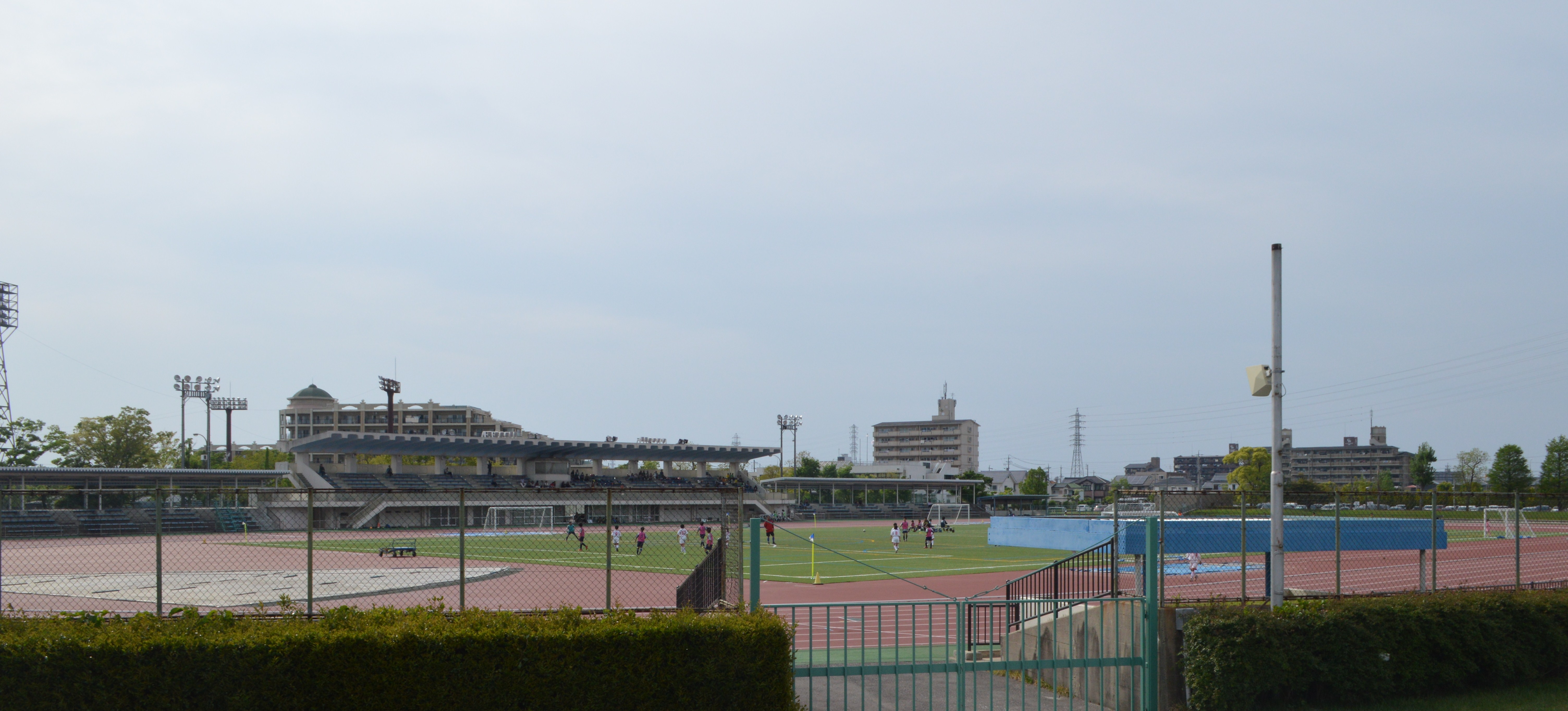
- Athletics stadium
- Interactive map of Anjō Sports Park
- Location: Anjō, Aichi Prefecture, Japan
- Coordinates: 34°58′23.3″N 137°05′24.5″E
- Facilities: See below

Construction
- Opened: 1966

Tenant
- 2026 Asian Games

Anjō Sports Park, also known as the Anjo City General Athletic Park (安城市総合運動公園, Anjō-shi Sōgō Undō Kōen), is a park and sports complex in Anjō at the Aichi Prefecture in Japan.

== History ==
The Anjō Sports Park opened on March 31, 1966. The athletics stadium opened months later in December 1966. Over the years until 2001, other sports facilities was built inside the urban park such as a gymnasium, baseball/softball fields, and tennis courts. The whole Sports Park is 20 hectares (49 acres).

== Facilities ==
Venue	Purpose	Seating capacity	Opened	Notes	Ref.
Anjō City Athletics Stadium	Stadium	4,700	December 16, 1966		
Anjō City Gymnasium	Indoor arena	982	January 21, 1979	Renovated in 2018. Also known as Tosho Arena Anjo from October 1, 2019 due to sponsorship reasons.	
Anjō City Baseball Fields	Baseball and softball diamond	782	March 31, 1969	Three diamonds	
Anjō City Tennis Courts	Tennis venue	–	March 31, 1996	Ten courts	
Anjo City Multipurpose Ground	Football pitch, gateball and ground golf course	-	January 18, 1998		
Anjo Sports Center	Indoor arena and aquatics center	-	April 1, 2001		
Anjo Softball Ground	Softball diamond	2,500 (A); 2,000 (B)	July 28, 2001	Two diamonds; Also known as Denso Bright Pegasus Stadium from October 1, 2019 due to sponsorship reasons. Renovated in 2026	
3x3 basketball court	Basketball court	–	2023		

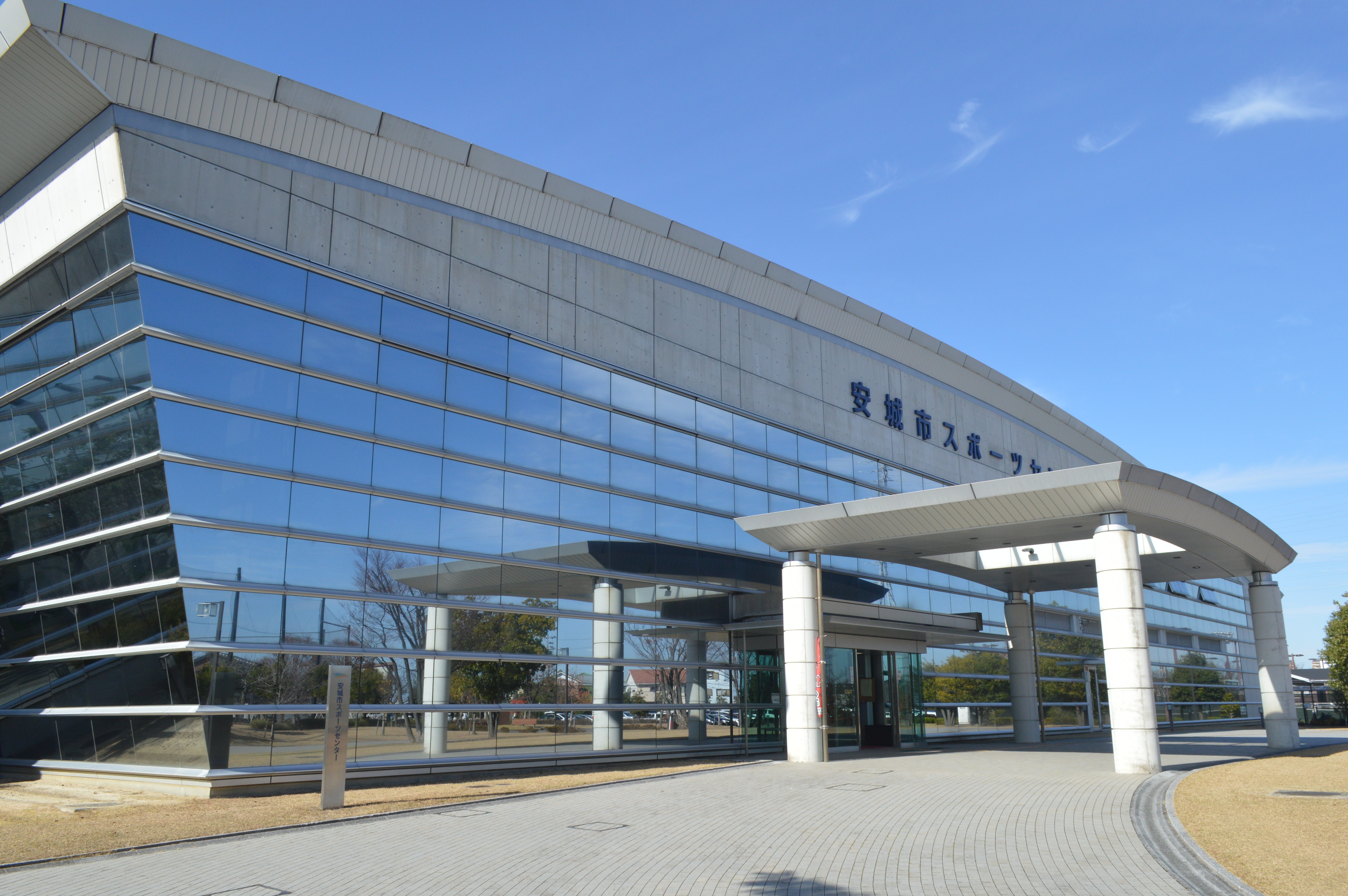
Anjo Sports Center

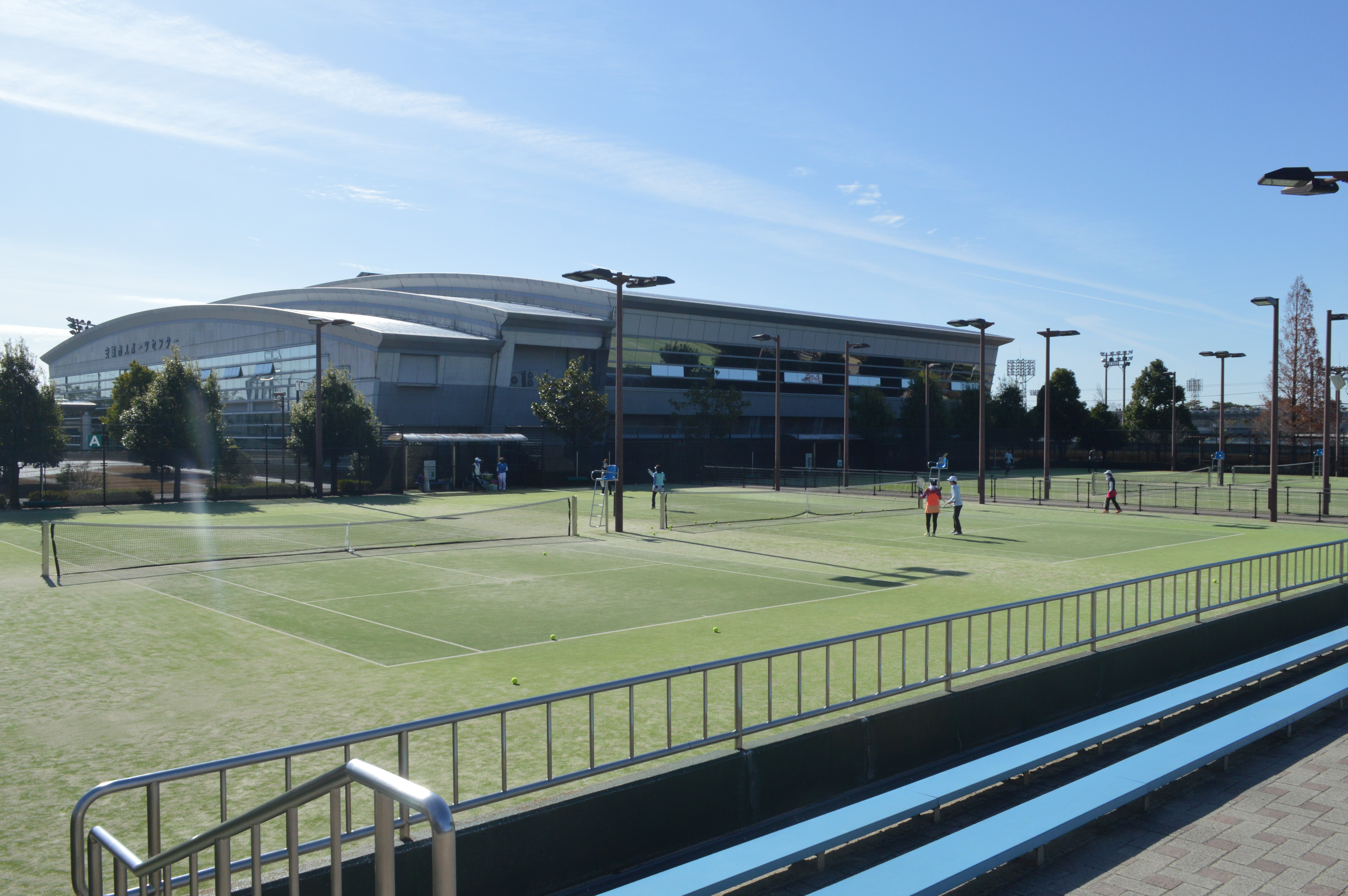
Tennis courts

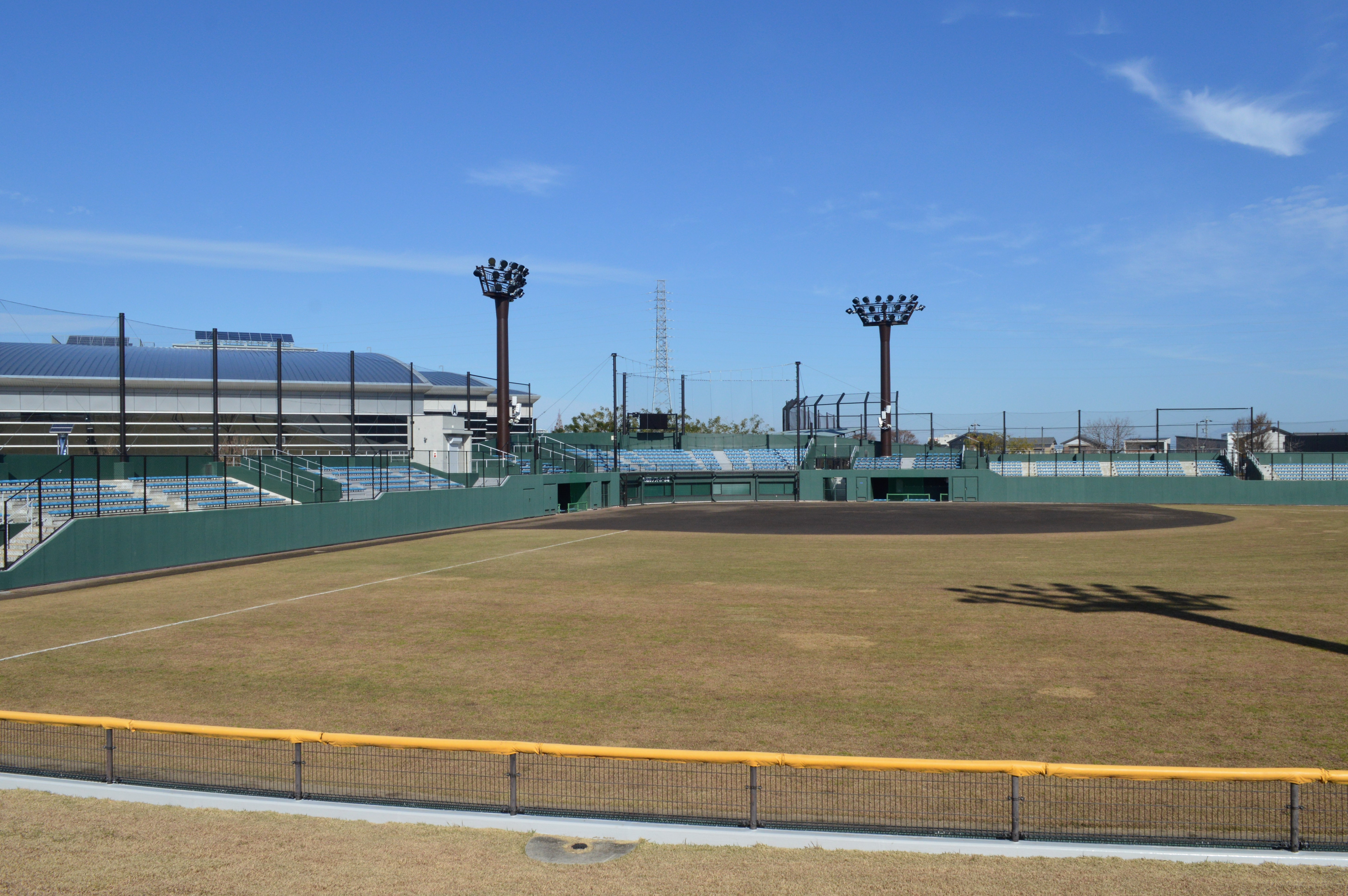
Softball Ground

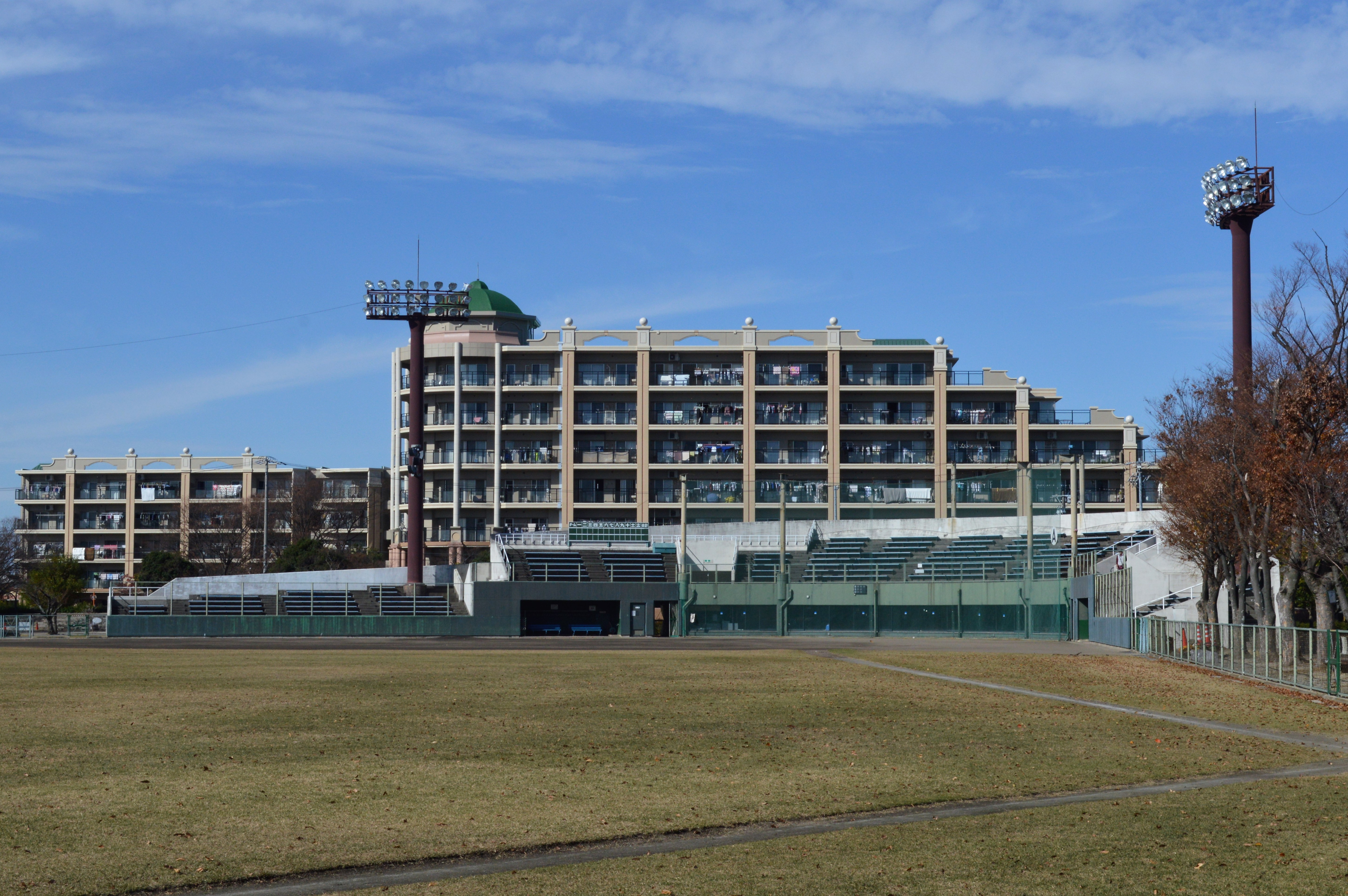
Baseball field

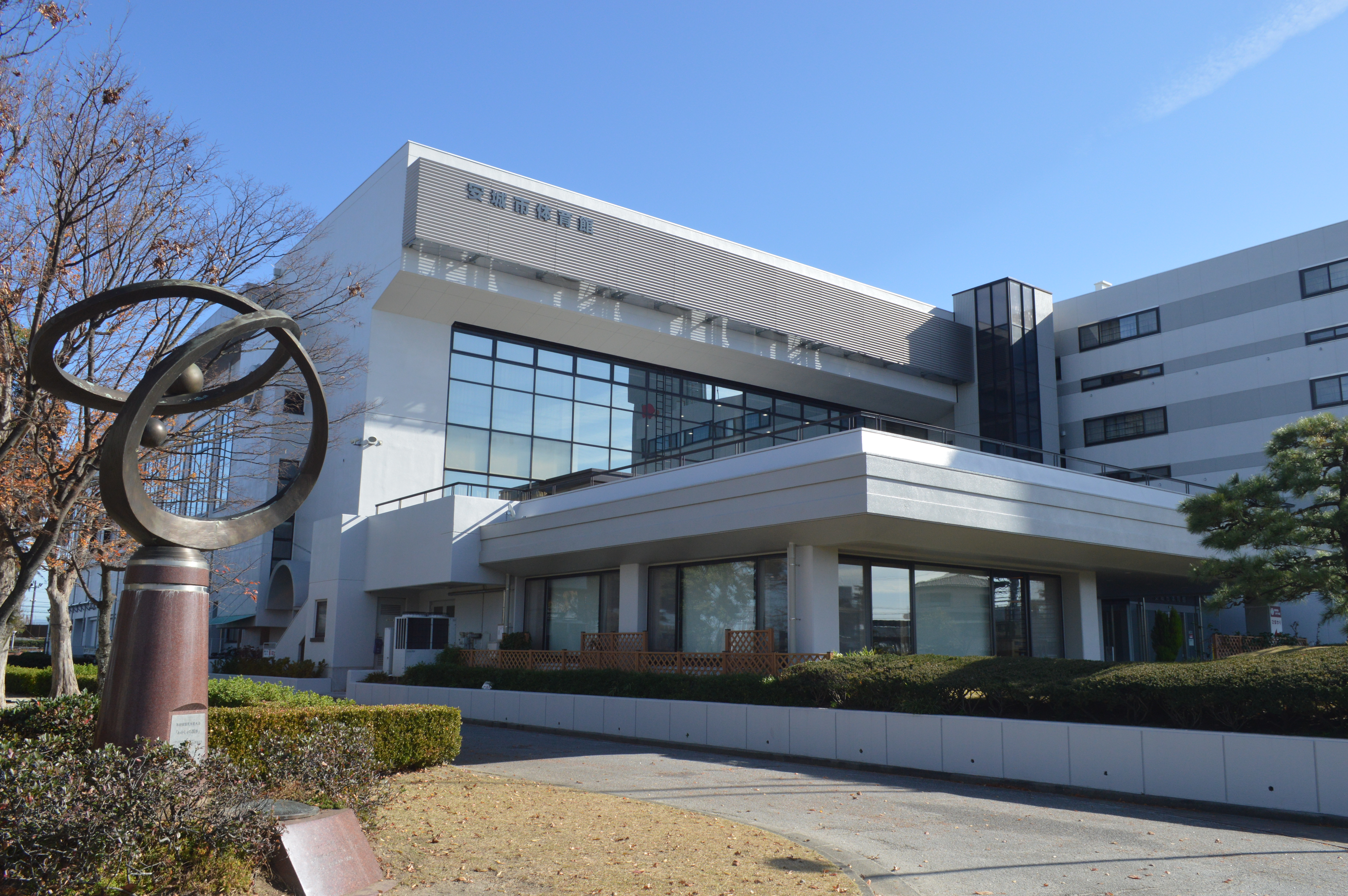
Anjo City Gymnasium
