= 1945 Mikawa earthquake =

Earthquake in Japan

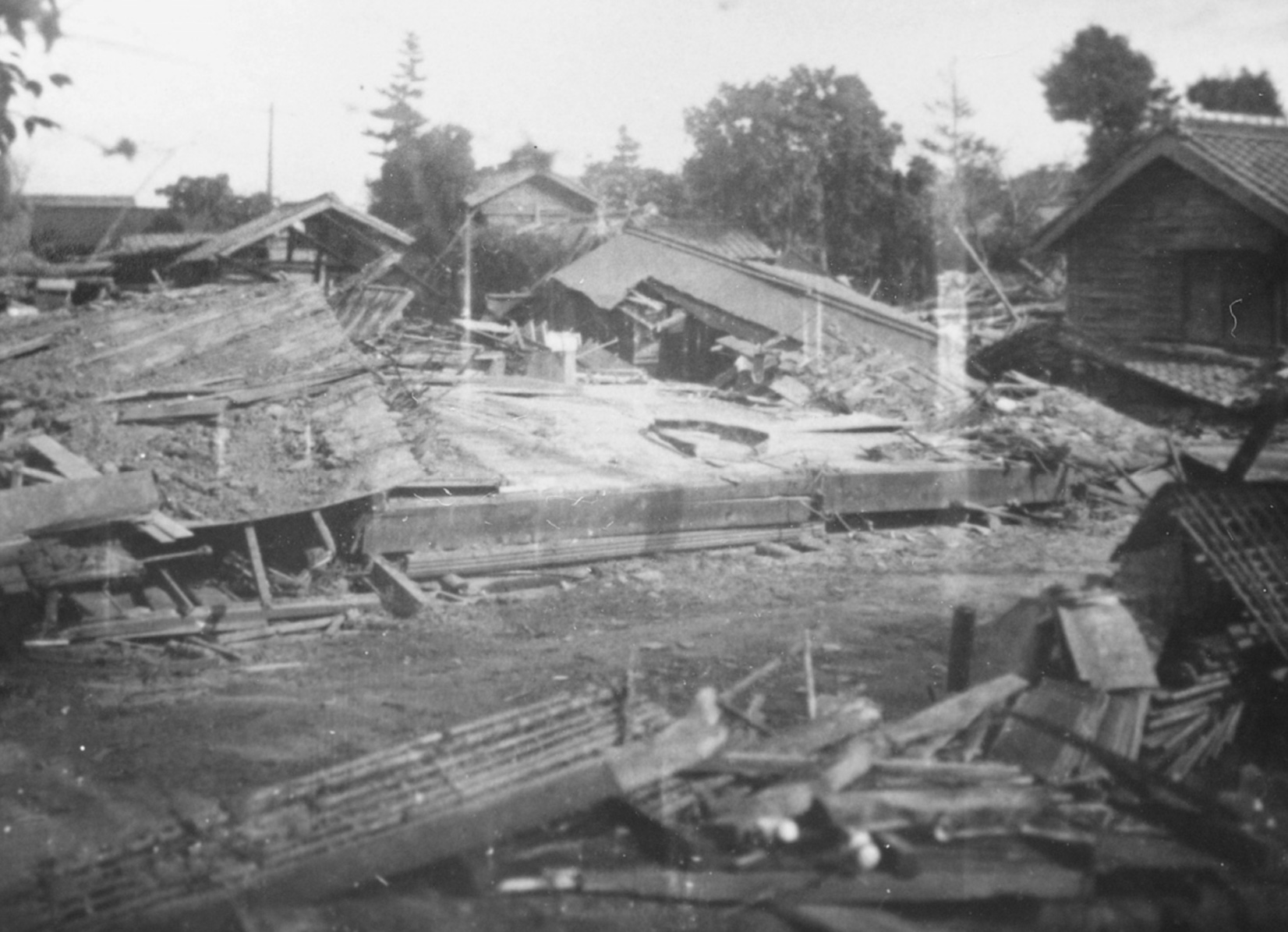
- Damage from the Mikawa earthquake

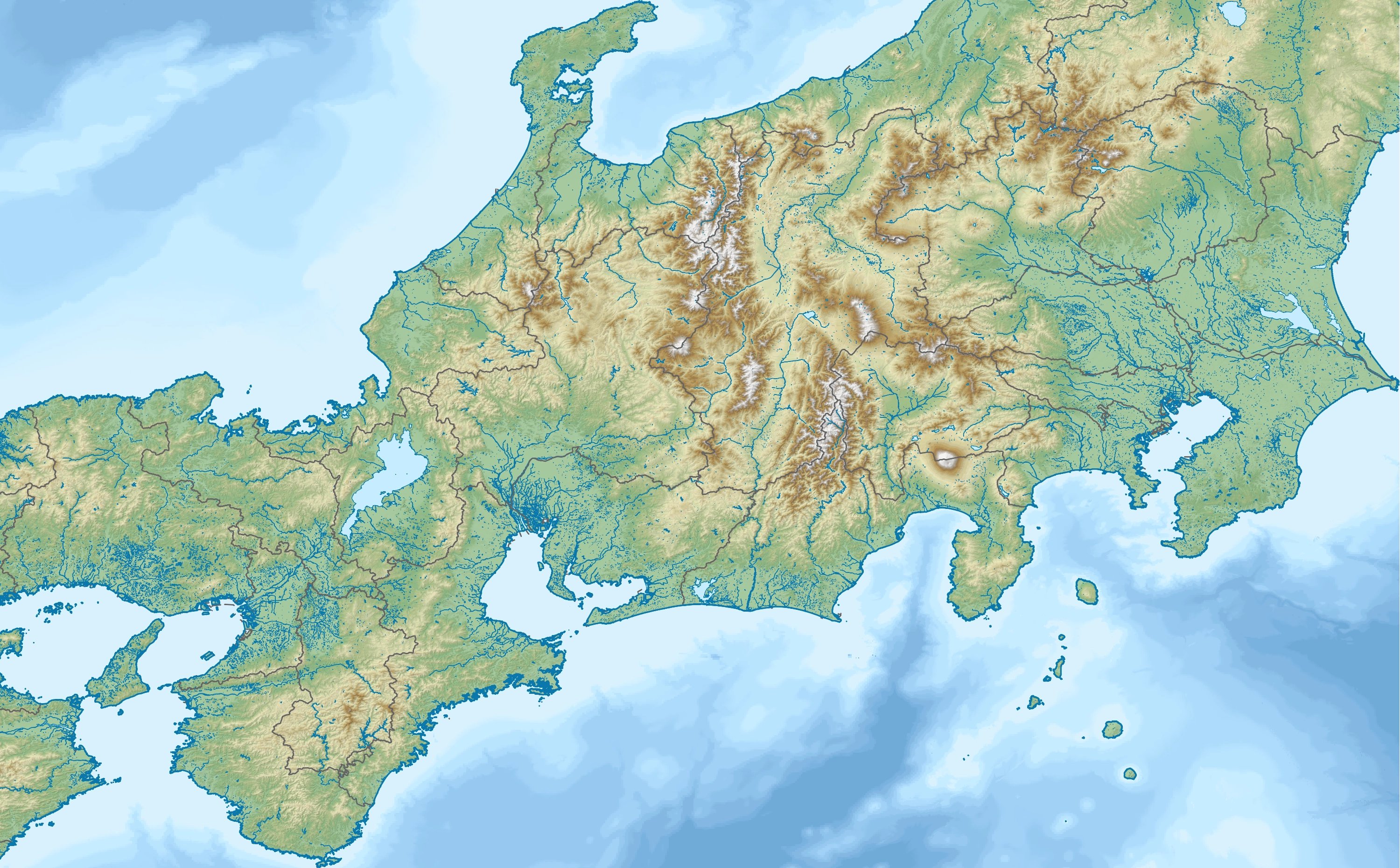
- Location within Aichi Prefecture Location within Central Japan
- UTC time: 1945-01-12 18:38:28
- ISC event: 898751
- USGS-ANSS: ComCat
- Local date: January 13, 1945
- Local time: 03:38 JST
- Magnitude: 6.8 M_{L}
- Depth: 11 km (7 mi)
- Epicenter: 34.7°N 137.1°E
- Areas affected: Japan
- Max. intensity: JMA 7
- Casualties: 1,180 dead, 3,866 injured, 1,126 missing

The 1945 Mikawa earthquake (三河地震, Mikawa jishin) occurred off Aichi prefecture, Japan at 03:38 AM on January 13. As it occurred during World War II, information about the disaster was censored. Efforts at keeping the disaster secret hampered relief efforts and contributed to the high death toll.

== Earthquake ==
The Mikawa earthquake's epicenter was offshore in Mikawa Bay at a depth of eleven kilometers. The city of Tsu recorded a magnitude of 6 on the Richter Scale; however, areas in southern Aichi prefecture were closer to the epicenter and suffered significant damage.

The earthquake created the Fukozu Fault, named after the village in the middle of the fault trace, in an area adjoining the west of the Tōkaidō Main Line railway between Okazaki and Gamagōri, Aichi Prefecture. The fault's total visible distance is little more than 9 km, but is of great interest to geologists as it has a right-angle bend in its middle part, rather than being straight or at a gentle curve. It is also remarkable in that ground displacement at the fault is up to one meter in places; however, the Tokaido Railway Line, although only 150 meters from the fault line in places, suffered no damage.

== Damage ==
Hardest hit were what is now Hazu District: Nishio city, Kira town, Anjō city, Hekinan city and Gamagōri city. The confirmed death toll was 1,180, with an additional 1,126 missing and 3,866 injured. As the earthquake occurred in the middle of the night, and towards the end of the war when fuel supplies were very low, only two houses were lost to fire, but 7,221 houses were destroyed, and 16,555 were severely damaged.

== Previous events ==
Similar large earthquakes have occurred in the same location in 1685 and 1686, and the large 1944 Tōnankai earthquake was also in the same area.

== See also ==
- List of earthquakes in 1945
- List of earthquakes in Japan
