= Fukozu Fault =

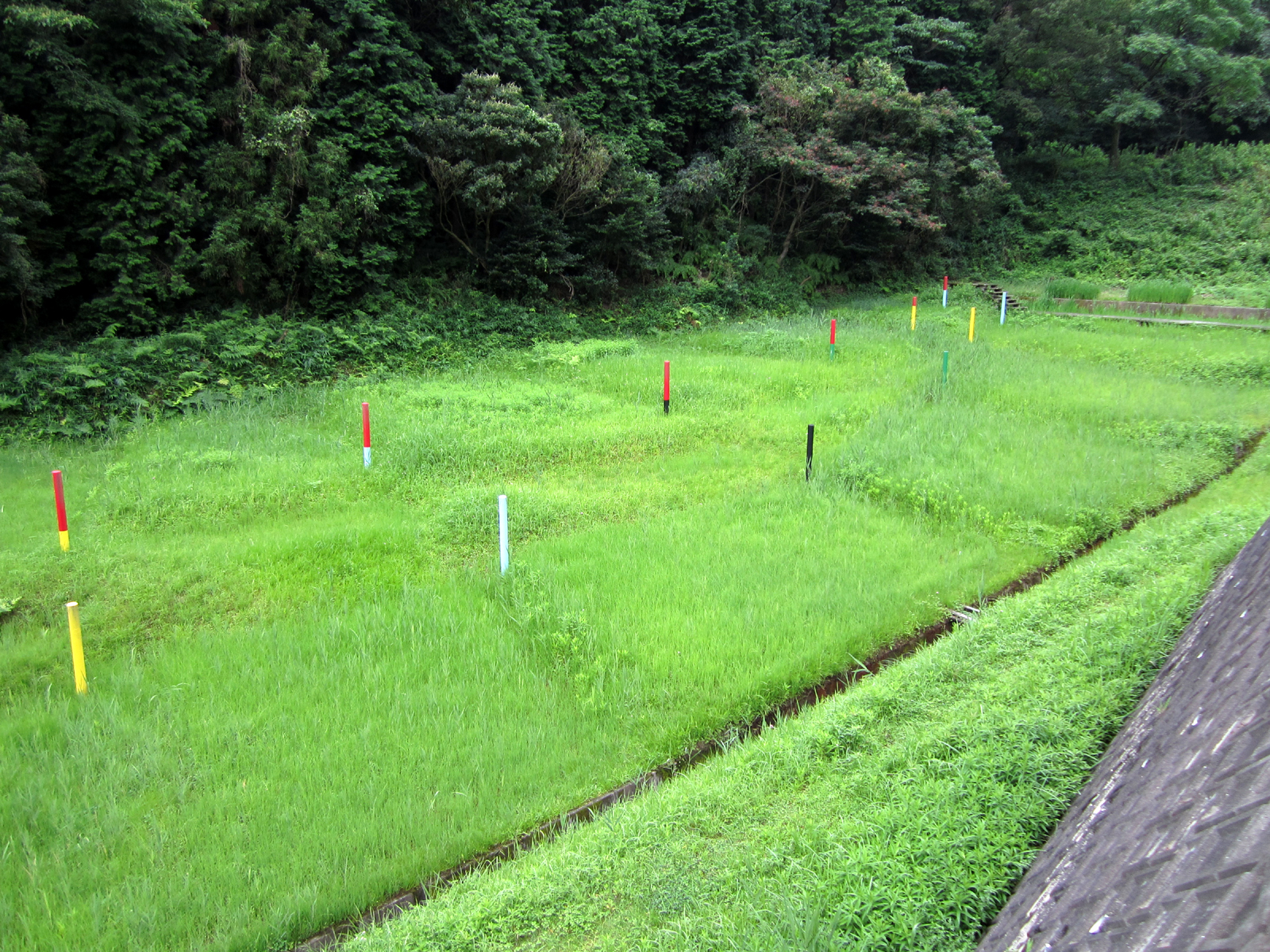

Fukōzu Fault (深溝断層, Fukōzu Dansō) is a fault in Aichi Prefecture of Japan, which was responsible for the 1945 Mikawa earthquake. It extends some 28 km (10 km under the sea) to Nishio City. It flows into the Yokosuka fault which extends another 20 km.
