= Hazo =

Hazo may refer to:

- Hajo, a pilgrimage site in Assam, India
- Hazzo or Hazo Kozluk in Turkey
- Hazo, son of Nahor, a minor Biblical character
- Samuel Hazo (born 1966), American composer
- Samuel John Hazo (born 1928), American writer

== See also ==
- Hazu, Aichi, a town in Japan
