= Nishio Domain =

Domain in Mikawa Province, Edo period Japan

Coordinates: 34°51′6″N 137°02′55″E

Nishio Domain 西尾藩
- Domain of Japan
- 1601–1636; 1638–1644; 1645–1871
- Capital: Nishio Castle
  - Type: Daimyō
- Historical era: Edo period
  - Established: 1601
  - Disestablished: 1871
- Today part of: Aichi Prefecture

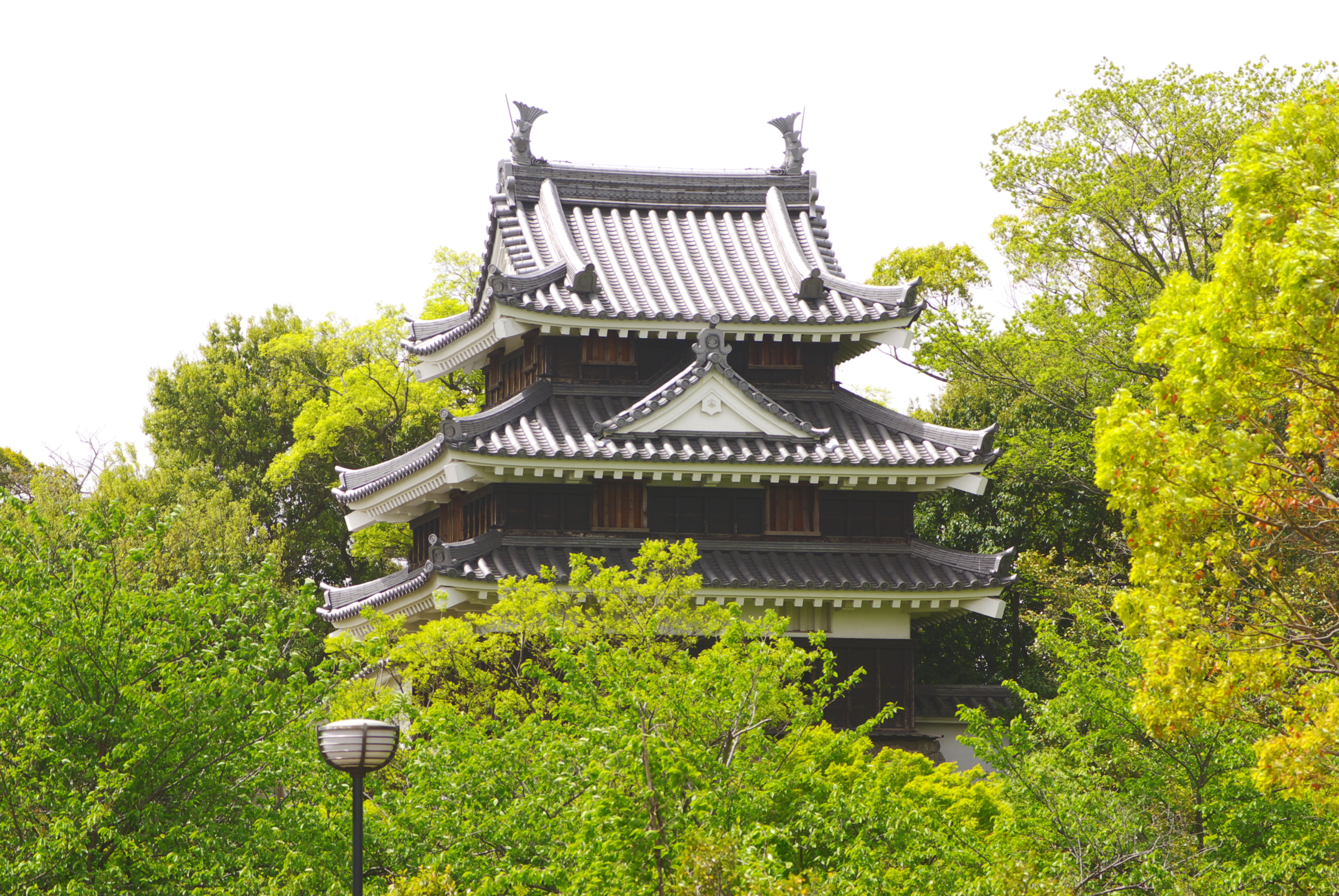
reconstructed yagura of Nishio Castle, administrative center for Nishio Domain

Nishio Domain (西尾藩, Nishio han) was a feudal domain of the Tokugawa shogunate of Edo period Japan, located in former Mikawa Province, in what is now the modern-day city of Nishio in Aichi Prefecture, Japan. It was centered on Nishio Castle.

== History ==
When Tokugawa Ieyasu became independent of the Imagawa clan in 1561, he established Nishio Castle, and assigned his close hereditary retainer, Sakai Masachika to become its first castellan. It was a mark of Ieyasu’s favor and trust, as Sakai Masachika was the first of Ieyasu’s retainers to be so honored. Following the Battle of Sekigahara, the Sakai clan was reassigned to more lucrative territories in western Japan, and was replaced by a branch of the Honda clan as first rulers of the new Nishio-han. The domain changed hands with almost every generation, reverting for periods to tenryō status under direct control of the Tokugawa shogunate. The Doi clan held the territory for almost 100 years (1663-1747), and the Ogyu branch of the Matsudaira clan from 1764 until the Meiji restoration in 1867. The final daimyō, Matsudaira Noritsune, took part in the Second Chōshū expedition, and was assigned to guard Osaka and Kyoto, but presided over domain deeply divided between pro- and anti- Shogunal factions. He surrendered to the new Meiji government during the Boshin War, after the defection of many junior samurai to the pro-Imperial cause. The domain had a population of 55,220 people in 13,039 households per the 1867 census, of whom 51,119 people were classed as farmers. The domain maintained its primary residence (kamiyashiki) in Edo at Daimyo-koji, in Marunouchi. Until the An’ei period (1772-1781) Nishio Domain was not a single contiguous territory, but consisted of many widely scattered holdings, which at the end of the Edo period consisted of:

- Mikawa Province: 112 villages in Hazu, 19 villages in Kamo, 7 villages in Nukata, 4 villages in Hoi, 1 village in Hekikai
- Suruga Province: 8 villages in Kitō, 2 villages in Haibara, 1 village in Fuji, 1 village in Suntō,
- Echizen Province: 27 villages in Nyū, 7 villages in Nanjō District, Fukui, 3 villages in Sakai

After the abolition of the han system in July 1871, the domain became “Nishio Prefecture”, which later became part of Nukata Prefecture, and finally Aichi Prefecture.

== List of daimyō ==
Name	Tenure	Courtesy title	Court Rank	kokudaka	Lineage
Honda clan (fudai) 1601–1617
Honda Yasutoshi (本多 康俊)	1601–1617	Nuidono no suke (縫殿助)	Lower 5th (従五位下)	20,000 koku	2nd son of Sakai Tadatsugu
Ogyū-Matsudaira clan (fudai) 1617–1621
Matsudaira Narishige (松平 成重)	1617–1621	Ukon-no-jō (右近将監)	Lower 5th (従五位下)	20,000 koku	transfer to Kameyama Domain
Honda clan (fudai) 1621–1636
Honda Toshitsugu (本多 俊次)	1621–1636	Shimōsa-no-kami (下総守)	Lower 5th (従五位下)	35,000 koku	son of Honda Yasutoshi; transfer to Kameyama Domain
tenryō 1636–1638
Ōta clan (fudai) 1638–1644
Ōta Sukemune (太田 資宗)	1638–1644	Bitchu-no-kami (備中守)	Lower 5th (従五位下)	15,000 –> 35,000 koku	transfer from Yamakawa Domain; 2nd son of Ōta Shigemasa; transfer to Hamamatsu Domain
tenryō 1644–1645
Ii clan (fudai) 1645–1659
Ii Naoyoshi (井伊 直好)	1645–1659	Hyōbu-no-shō (兵部少輔)	Lower 5th (従五位下)	35,000 koku	transfer from Anaka Domain; son of Ii Naokatsu; transfer to Kakegawa Domain
Mashiyama clan (fudai) 1659–1663
Mashiyama Masatoshi (増山 正利)	1659–1662	Danjō-shōhitsu (弾正少弼)	Lower 5th (従五位下)	20,000 koku	son of Aoki Toshinaga
Mashiyama Masamitsu (増山 正弥)	1662–1663	Hyōbu-no-shō (兵部少輔)	Lower 5th (従五位下)	20,000 koku	son of Nasu Tsukemutsu; transfer to Shimodate Domain
Doi clan (fudai) 1663–1747
Doi Toshinaga (土井 利長)	1663–1681	Hyōgo-ryō (兵庫頭)	Lower 5th (従五位下)	23,000 koku	2nd son of Doi Toshikatsu
Doi Toshimoto (土井 利意)	1681–1724	Yamashiro-no-kami (山城守)	Lower 5th (従五位下)	23,000 koku	7th son of Inaba Masanori
Doi Toshitsune (土井 利庸)	1724–1734	Awaji-no-kami (淡路守)	Lower 5th (従五位下)	23,000 koku	adopted from Miura clan
Doi Toshinobu (土井 利信)	1734–1747	Iyo-no-kami (伊予守)	Lower 5th (従五位下)	23,000 koku	son of Toshinaga; transfer to Kariya Domain
Miura clan (fudai) 1747–1764
Miura Yoshisato (三浦 義理)	1747–1756	Kazue-no-kami (主計頭)	Lower 5th (従五位下)	23,000 koku	son of Akihiro; transfer from Kariya Domain
Miura Akitsugu (三浦 明次)	1756–1764	Hyōgo-ryō (兵庫頭)	Lower 5th (従五位下)	23,000 koku	3rd son of Akitaka; transfer to Katsuyama Domain
Ogyū-Matsudaira clan (fudai) 1764–1871
Matsudaira Norisuke (松平 乗祐)	1764–1769	Izumi-no-kami (和泉守)	Lower 5th (従五位下)	60,000 koku	son of Norisato; transfer from Yamagata Domain
Matsudaira Norisada (松平乗完)	1769–1793	Izumi-no-kami (和泉守)	Lower 4th (従四位下)	60,000 koku	4th son of Norisuke
Matsudaira Norihiro (松平 乗寛)	1793–1839	Izumi-no-kami( 和泉守)	Lower 5th (従五位下)	60,000 koku	son of Norisada
Matsudaira Noriyasu (松平 乗全)	1839–1862	Izumi-no-kami (和泉守)	Lower 4th (従四位下)	60,000 koku	son of Norihiro
Matsudaira Noritsune (松平 乗秩)	1862–1871	Izumi-no-kami (和泉守)	Lower 5th (従五位下)	60,000 koku	2nd son of Norihiro
