= Yatsuomote ware =

Type of Japanese pottery

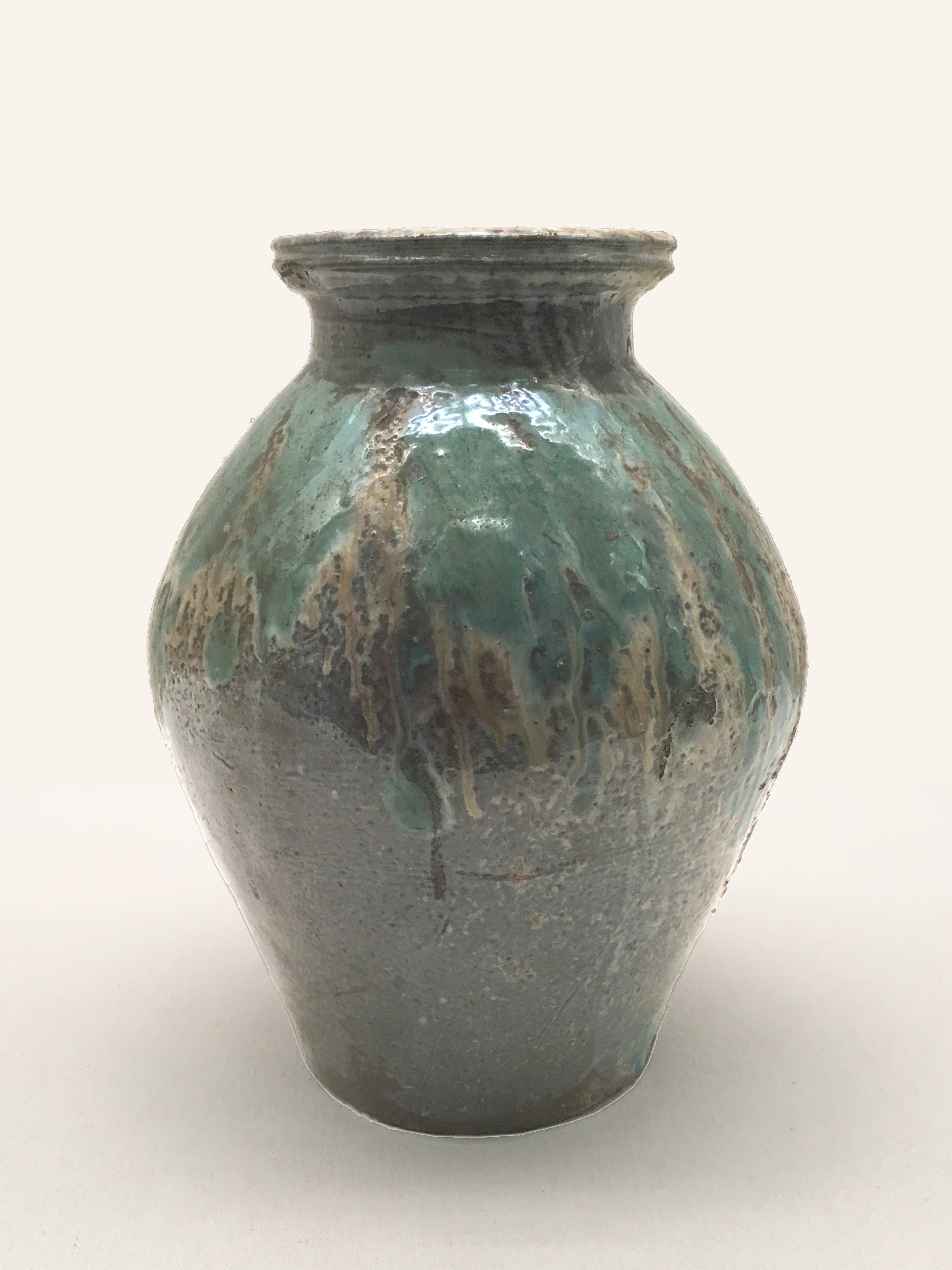
Yatsuomote ware jar by Katō Hachiemon, late Edo period

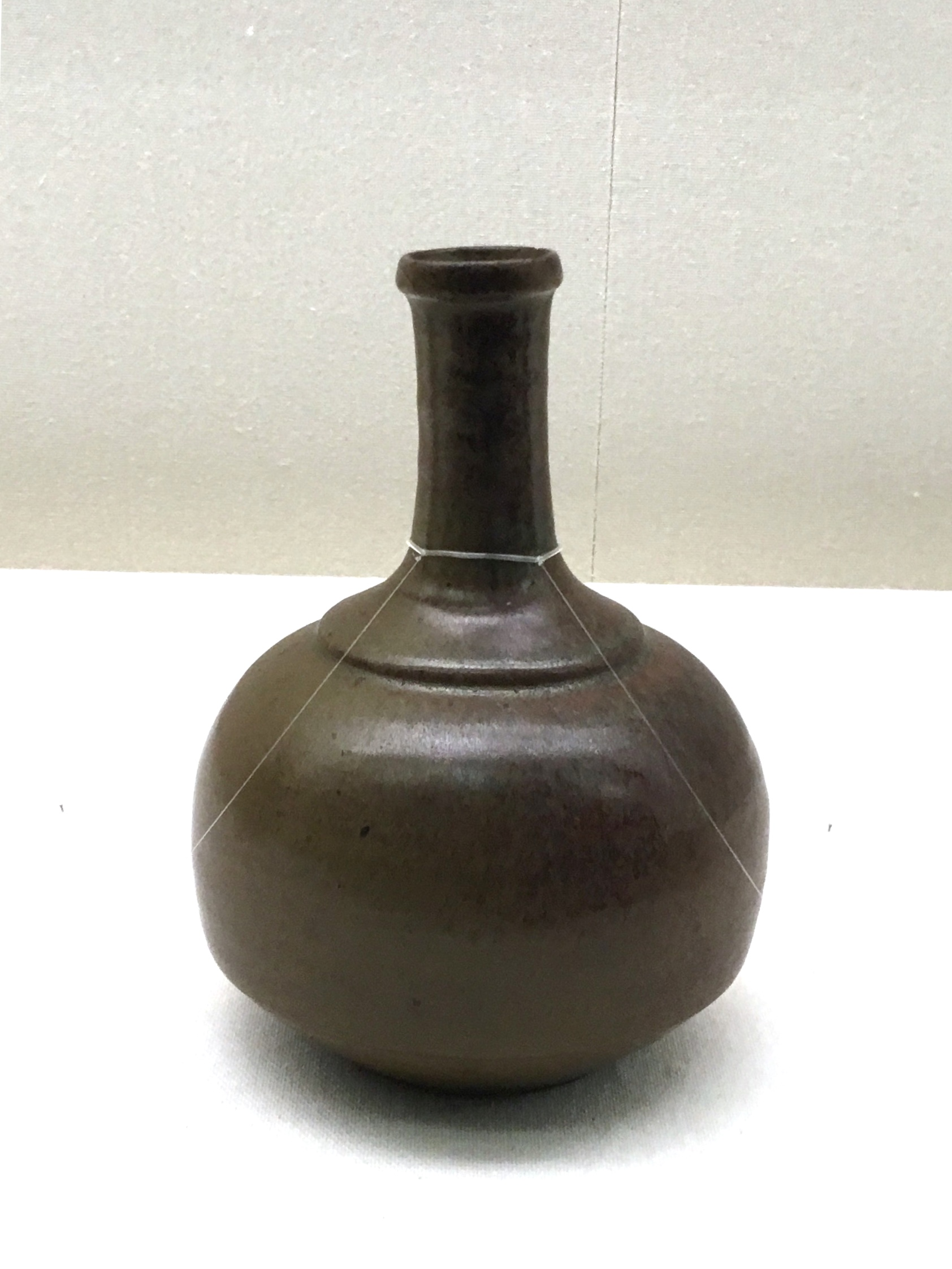
Tokkuri by Katō Kumazō, late Edo period

Yatsuomote ware (ハツ面焼(やつおもてやき)) is a type of Japanese pottery originally from Nishio (西尾市, Nishio-shi), Mikawa Province in the Chūbu region of Japan during the late Edo period.

Around 1825 Katō Hachiemon (加藤八右衛門) opened his kiln at the southern foot of Mount Yatsuomote (八ツ面山), located northeast of Nishio. Under his eldest son Kumazō (熊蔵) it expanded. At the beginning of production, roof tiles and unglazed jars were made, but later, by using techniques from Tokoname ware and Seto ware, miscellaneous items such as tokkuri were made. Sake bottles (commonly known as "Kumazō sake bottles") were produced.

The soil around Nishio is rich in mica deposits, which was already mined in the Nara period. After an incident at the mountain a small bell was offered to soothe the kami. Katō Kumazō started a tradition where small ceramic zodiac bells (きらら鈴) were made out of local mica kneaded into the clay, and after burning in the kiln the bell would make a pleasing sound when rung. Such a bell made by him was offered to the Nishinomiya Shrine.

Production ceased around the Meiji era. Although not many vessels have survived, they have experienced a reappraisal for their local folk art beauty. This type of art later became formalised as Mingei.
