= 1945 Balochistan earthquake =

Natural disaster in Pakistan

- Location within Pakistan
- UTC time: 1945-11-27 21:56:53
- ISC event: 899220
- USGS-ANSS: ComCat
- Local date: 28 November 1945
- Local time: 1:26 PKT
- Magnitude: 8.1 M_{w}
- Depth: 15 kilometers (9.3 mi)
- Epicenter: 24.5°N 63.0°E
- Areas affected: British India; Makran Coast
- Max. intensity: MMI X (Extreme)
- Tsunami: 15.24 m (50.0 ft)
- Casualties: 300–4,000 dead

The 1945 Balochistan earthquake (Note: Balochi: بلۏچستان ڈگار جنز, Urdu: بلوچستان زلزلہ) occurred in British India at 1:26 PKT on 28 November 1945 with a moment magnitude of 8.1 on the Richter scale and a maximum perceived intensity of X (Extreme) on the Mercalli intensity scale.

== Earthquake ==
The earthquake, with its epicenter 97.6 kilometers south-southwest of Pasni in Balochistan, unleashed a tsunami that caused damage along the Makran coastal region. Deaths from the event were reported to be at least 300 and as many as 4,000 people.

Another very large earthquake (7.3 M_{s}) occurred in nearly the same location on August 5, 1947, however not much is known about the event or its effects.

== See also ==
- List of earthquakes in 1945
- List of earthquakes in Pakistan

== Sources ==
- Quittmeyer, R. C.; Jacob, K. H. (1979), "Historical and modern seismicity of Pakistan, Afghanistan, northwestern India, and southeastern Iran", Bulletin of the Seismological Society of America, 69 (3): 773–823
