= List of earthquakes in 1945 =

Earthquakes in 1945
Approximate epicenters of the earthquakes in 1945
- 4.0–5.9 magnitude
- 6.0–6.9 magnitude
- 7.0–7.9 magnitude
- 8.0+ magnitude
- Strongest magnitude: India, off the coast of Pakistan (Magnitude 8.1) November 27
- Deadliest: India, off the coast of Pakistan (Magnitude 8.1) November 27 4,000 deaths
- Total fatalities: 6,337

Number by magnitude
- 9.0+: 0

This is a list of earthquakes in 1945. Only magnitude 6.0 or greater earthquakes appear on the list. Lower magnitude events are included if they have caused death, injury or damage. Events which occurred in remote areas will be excluded from the list as they wouldn't have generated significant media interest. All dates are listed according to UTC time. The last year of World War II was dominated by two events which caused the vast bulk of the death toll. In January, over 2,300 were killed by a large magnitude 6.6 quake in Japan. In November, a magnitude 8.1 quake caused a devastating tsunami leading to 4,000 deaths in Pakistan. In terms of large events, most activity occurred in the western Pacific Ocean. Japan, New Guinea, and the southwest Pacific Islands saw several events with a magnitude over 7.0.

== Overall ==
=== By death toll ===
Rank	Death toll	Magnitude	Location	MMI	Depth (km)	Date
1	4,000	8.1	India, off the coast of Pakistan	X (Extreme)	15.0	November 27
2	2,306	6.6	Empire of Japan, Aichi Prefecture, Honshu	VII (Very strong)	10.0	January 12
3	17	6.2	Republic of China (1912-1949), Hebei Province	VIII (Severe)	35.0	September 23

- Note: At least 10 casualties

=== By magnitude ===
Rank	Magnitude	Death toll	Location	MMI	Depth (km)	Date
1	8.1	4,000	India, off the coast of Pakistan	X (Extreme)	15.0	November 27
2	7.8	0	Australia, West New Britain Province, New Guinea	( )	85.0	December 28
3	7.5	0	New Zealand, off the south coast of South Island, New Zealand	( )	20.0	September 1
= 4	7.2	0	France, southeast of the Loyalty Islands, New Caledonia	( )	20.0	February 1
= 4	7.2	2	Empire of Japan, off the northeast coast of Honshu	VII (Very strong)	58.7	February 10
= 4	7.2	0	Empire of Japan, Volcano Islands	( )	15.0	February 26
= 4	7.2	0	Empire of Japan, off the east coast of Honshu	( )	50.0	March 11
= 5	7.1	0	USA, Northern Mariana Islands	( )	138.5	July 15
= 5	7.1	0	Chile, Santiago Metropolitan Region	( )	91.9	September 13
= 6	7.0	0	France, southeast of the Loyalty Islands, New Caledonia	( )	20.0	February 1
= 6	7.0	0	Soviet Union, off the east coast of Kamchatka, Russia	VI (Strong)	35.0	April 15
= 6	7.0	0	Panama, Chiriqui Province	( )	80.0	June 3
= 6	7.0	0	Soviet Union, Kuril Islands, Russia	( )	100.0	June 22
= 6	7.0	0	Australia, Bismarck Sea, New Guinea	( )	50.0	September 22
= 6	7.0	0	Fiji	( )	592.3	November 26

- Note: At least 7.0 magnitude

== Notable events ==
=== January ===
January
- Strongest magnitude: 6.6 M_{w} Empire of Japan
- Deadliest: 6.6 M_{w} Empire of Japan; 2,306 deaths
- Total fatalities: 2,306

Number by magnitude
- 8.0–8.9: 0
- 7.0–7.9: 0
- 6.0–6.9: 3

Date	Country and location	M_{w}	Depth (km)	MMI	Notes	Casualties	
Date	Country and location	M_{w}	Depth (km)	MMI	Notes	Dead	Injured
1	Canada, Baffin Bay	6.5	35.0				
12	Empire of Japan, Aichi Prefecture, Honshu	6.6	10.0	VII	The 1945 Mikawa earthquake left 2,306 people dead and 896 injured. 7,221 homes were destroyed.	2,306	896
22	Dominican Republic, Espaillat Province	6.0	35.0				

=== February ===
February
- Strongest magnitude: 7.2 M_{w} 3 events
- Deadliest: 7.2 M_{w} Empire of Japan; 2 deaths
- Total fatalities: 2

Number by magnitude
- 8.0–8.9: 0
- 7.0–7.9: 4
- 6.0–6.9: 2

Date	Country and location	M_{w}	Depth (km)	MMI	Notes	Casualties	
Date	Country and location	M_{w}	Depth (km)	MMI	Notes	Dead	Injured
1	France, southeast of the Loyalty Islands, New Caledonia	7.0	20.0	rowspan="2"| Doublet earthquake.			
1	France, southeast of the Loyalty Islands, New Caledonia	7.2	20.0				
10	Empire of Japan, off the northeast coast of Honshu	7.2	58.7	VII	A tsunami was generated. 2 people were killed and 2 homes were destroyed.	2	
14	United States, southern Idaho	6.0	10.0	VI			
18	Empire of Japan, off the northeast coast of Honshu	6.4	22.5		Aftershock.		
26	Empire of Japan, Volcano Islands	7.2	15.0				

=== March ===
March
- Strongest magnitude: 7.2 M_{w} Empire of Japan
- Deadliest: 6.0 M_{w} Uganda; 5 deaths
- Total fatalities: 5

Number by magnitude
- 8.0–8.9: 0
- 7.0–7.9: 1
- 6.0–6.9: 3

Date	Country and location	M_{w}	Depth (km)	MMI	Notes	Casualties	
Date	Country and location	M_{w}	Depth (km)	MMI	Notes	Dead	Injured
11	Empire of Japan, southeast of Mindanao, Philippines	6.8	100.0				
11	Empire of Japan, off the east coast of Honshu	7.2	50.0				
17	Colombia, off the west coast of	6.8	15.0				
18	Uganda, Central Region, Uganda	6.0	35.0	IX	5 people were killed and some damage was caused.	5	

=== April ===
April
- Strongest magnitude: 7.0 M_{w} Soviet Union
- Total fatalities: 0

Number by magnitude
- 8.0–8.9: 0
- 7.0–7.9: 1
- 6.0–6.9: 5

Date	Country and location	M_{w}	Depth (km)	MMI	Notes	Casualties	
Date	Country and location	M_{w}	Depth (km)	MMI	Notes	Dead	Injured
15	Soviet Union, off the east coast of Kamchatka, Russia	7.0	35.0	VI			
15	Soviet Union, off the east coast of Kamchatka, Russia	6.8	35.0		Aftershock.		
19	France, southeast of the Loyalty Islands, New Caledonia	6.5	35.0				
21	Mexico, State of Mexico	6.5	100.0				
22	Empire of Japan, Celebes Sea	6.8	565.0				
23	Australia, East New Britain Province, New Guinea	6.8	160.0				

=== May ===
May
- Strongest magnitude: 6.8 M_{w} Empire of Japan
- Total fatalities: 0

Number by magnitude
- 8.0–8.9: 0
- 7.0–7.9: 0
- 6.0–6.9: 3

Date	Country and location	M_{w}	Depth (km)	MMI	Notes	Casualties	
Date	Country and location	M_{w}	Depth (km)	MMI	Notes	Dead	Injured
9	Empire of Japan, western Banda Sea, Dutch East Indies	6.8	550.0				
19	United States, off the coast of northern California	6.4	10.0	V			
31	Empire of Japan, off the east coast of Honshu	6.6	50.0				

=== June ===
June
- Strongest magnitude: 7.0 M_{w} 2 events
- Total fatalities: 0

Number by magnitude
- 8.0–8.9: 0
- 7.0–7.9: 2
- 6.0–6.9: 3

Date	Country and location	M_{w}	Depth (km)	MMI	Notes	Casualties	
Date	Country and location	M_{w}	Depth (km)	MMI	Notes	Dead	Injured
3	Panama, Chiriqui Province	7.0	80.0				
4	India, Uttarakhand	6.4	15.0	VII			
22	Soviet Union, Kuril Islands, Russia	7.0	100.0				
22	India, Himachal Pradesh	6.5	20.0	VI			
27	Mexico, Gulf of California	6.7	10.0	VI			

=== July ===
July
- Strongest magnitude: 7.1 M_{w} United States
- Total fatalities: 0

Number by magnitude
- 8.0–8.9: 0
- 7.0–7.9: 1
- 6.0–6.9: 2

Date	Country and location	M_{w}	Depth (km)	MMI	Notes	Casualties	
Date	Country and location	M_{w}	Depth (km)	MMI	Notes	Dead	Injured
9	Colombia, Cauca Department	6.5	100.0				
15	United States, Northern Mariana Islands	7.1	138.5				
23	Empire of Japan, northern Sumatra, Dutch East Indies	6.7	15.0	VII			

=== August ===
August
- Strongest magnitude: 6.9 M_{w} New Hebrides
- Total fatalities: 0

Number by magnitude
- 8.0–8.9: 0
- 7.0–7.9: 0
- 6.0–6.9: 7

Date	Country and location	M_{w}	Depth (km)	MMI	Notes	Casualties	
Date	Country and location	M_{w}	Depth (km)	MMI	Notes	Dead	Injured
1	Empire of Japan, off the east coast of Taiwan	6.3	14.0	V			
2	Canada, northern Haida Gwaii	6.2	35.0				
8	India, Andaman Islands	6.4	20.0				
14	Japan, Ryukyu Islands	6.5	15.0				
21	Peru, Pasco Region	6.8	117.3				
28	Japan, off the south coast of Honshu	6.7	100.0				
29	New Hebrides, Vanuatu	6.9	20.0	VI			

=== September ===
September
- Strongest magnitude: 7.5 M_{w} New Zealand
- Deadliest: 6.2 M_{w} Republic of China (1912-1949); 17 deaths
- Total fatalities: 17

Number by magnitude
- 8.0–8.9: 0
- 7.0–7.9: 3
- 6.0–6.9: 6

Date	Country and location	M_{w}	Depth (km)	MMI	Notes	Casualties	
Date	Country and location	M_{w}	Depth (km)	MMI	Notes	Dead	Injured
1	New Zealand, off the south coast of South Island	7.5	20.0				
2	eastern Mediterranean Sea	6.5	80.0				
5	Australia, south of New Ireland (island), New Guinea	6.6	45.0	VI			
7	Romania, Vrancea County	6.5	100.0				
12	France, Sangha Department (Republic of the Congo)	6.0	35.0	VIII	Some damage was caused.		
13	Chile, Santiago Metropolitan Region	7.1	91.9				
19	Japan, off the south coast of Hokkaido	6.6	65.0				
22	Australia, Bismarck Sea, New Guinea	7.0	50.0				
23	Republic of China (1912-1949), Hebei Province	6.2	35.0	VIII	17 people were killed and 30 were injured. Some homes were destroyed.	17	30

=== October ===
October
- Strongest magnitude: 6.8 M_{w} 2 events
- Total fatalities: 0

Number by magnitude
- 8.0–8.9: 0
- 7.0–7.9: 0
- 6.0–6.9: 6

Date	Country and location	M_{w}	Depth (km)	MMI	Notes	Casualties	
Date	Country and location	M_{w}	Depth (km)	MMI	Notes	Dead	Injured
7	El Salvador, off coast of	6.1	25.0				
9	Soviet Union, Kuril Islands, Russia	6.6	60.0	VI			
11	Mexico, Guerrero	6.5	90.0				
16	Indonesia, Molucca Sea	6.5	55.0	VI			
27	Guatemala, Quiche Department	6.8	200.0				
28	New Hebrides, Vanuatu	6.8	183.6				

=== November ===
November
- Strongest magnitude: 8.1 M_{w} India
- Deadliest: 8.1 M_{w} India; 4,000 deaths
- Total fatalities: 4,000

Number by magnitude
- 8.0–8.9: 1
- 7.0–7.9: 1
- 6.0–6.9: 1

Date	Country and location	M_{w}	Depth (km)	MMI	Notes	Casualties	
Date	Country and location	M_{w}	Depth (km)	MMI	Notes	Dead	Injured
3	United States, east of Kodiak Island, Alaska	6.8	50.0				
26	Fiji	7.0	592.3				
27	India, off the coast of Pakistan	8.1	15.0	X	The 1945 Balochistan earthquake caused over 4,000 deaths mainly due to a tsunami. $25 million (1945 rate) in property damage was reported.	4,000	

=== December ===
December
- Strongest magnitude: 7.8 M_{w} Australia
- Deadliest: 0.0 M_{w} Turkey; 7 deaths
- Total fatalities: 7

Number by magnitude
- 8.0–8.9: 0
- 7.0–7.9: 1
- 6.0–6.9: 4

Date	Country and location	M_{w}	Depth (km)	MMI	Notes	Casualties	
Date	Country and location	M_{w}	Depth (km)	MMI	Notes	Dead	Injured
8	Australia, West New Britain Province, New Guinea	6.7	55.0	VI			
9	Romania, Buzau County	6.0	100.0				
21	Turkey, Denizli Province	0.0	0.0	VIII	7 deaths were caused and some damage was caused. Magnitude and depth unknown.	7	
23	Venezuela, Trinidad and Tobago, Columbus Channel	6.5	100.0				
27	Australia, West New Britain Province, New Guinea	6.7	55.0	VI	Foreshock.		
28	Australia, West New Britain Province, New Guinea	7.8	85.0				
