= Isshiki, Aichi =

Isshiki 一色町
- Former municipality
- Flag Emblem

- Location of Isshiki in Aichi Prefecture

- Location in Japan
- Coordinates: 34°49′N 137°2′E
- Country: Japan
- Region: Chūbu (Tōkai)
- Prefecture: Aichi Prefecture
- District: Hazu
- Merged: April 1, 2011 (now part of Nishio)

Area
  - Total: 22.53 km^{2} (8.70 sq mi)

Population (February 1, 2010)
  - Total: 23,775
  - Density: 1,055.25/km^{2} (2,733.1/sq mi)
- Time zone: UTC+09:00 (JST)
- Symbols
- Flower: Carnation
- Tree: Pinus thunbergii

Isshiki (一色町, Isshiki-chō) was a town located in Hazu District, Aichi Prefecture, Japan.

As of May 1, 2004, the village had an estimated population of 23,775 and a population density of 1,055.25 persons per km^{2}. Its total area was 22.53 km^{2}.

Isshiki was a coastal settlement in southern Aichi Prefecture, on Mikawa Bay. The town economy was based on commercial fishing, horticulture and seasonal tourism. The modern town was founded on October 1, 1923, and expanded in August 1954 by merging with adjacent Sakuma Village.

On April 1, 2011, Isshiki, along with the towns of Hazu and Kira (all from Hazu District), was merged into the expanded city of Nishio. Hazu District was dissolved as a result of this merger.
