= Nishio Castle =

Coordinates: 34°51′46″N 137°02′55″E

- 西尾城
- Nishio, Aichi Prefecture, Japan
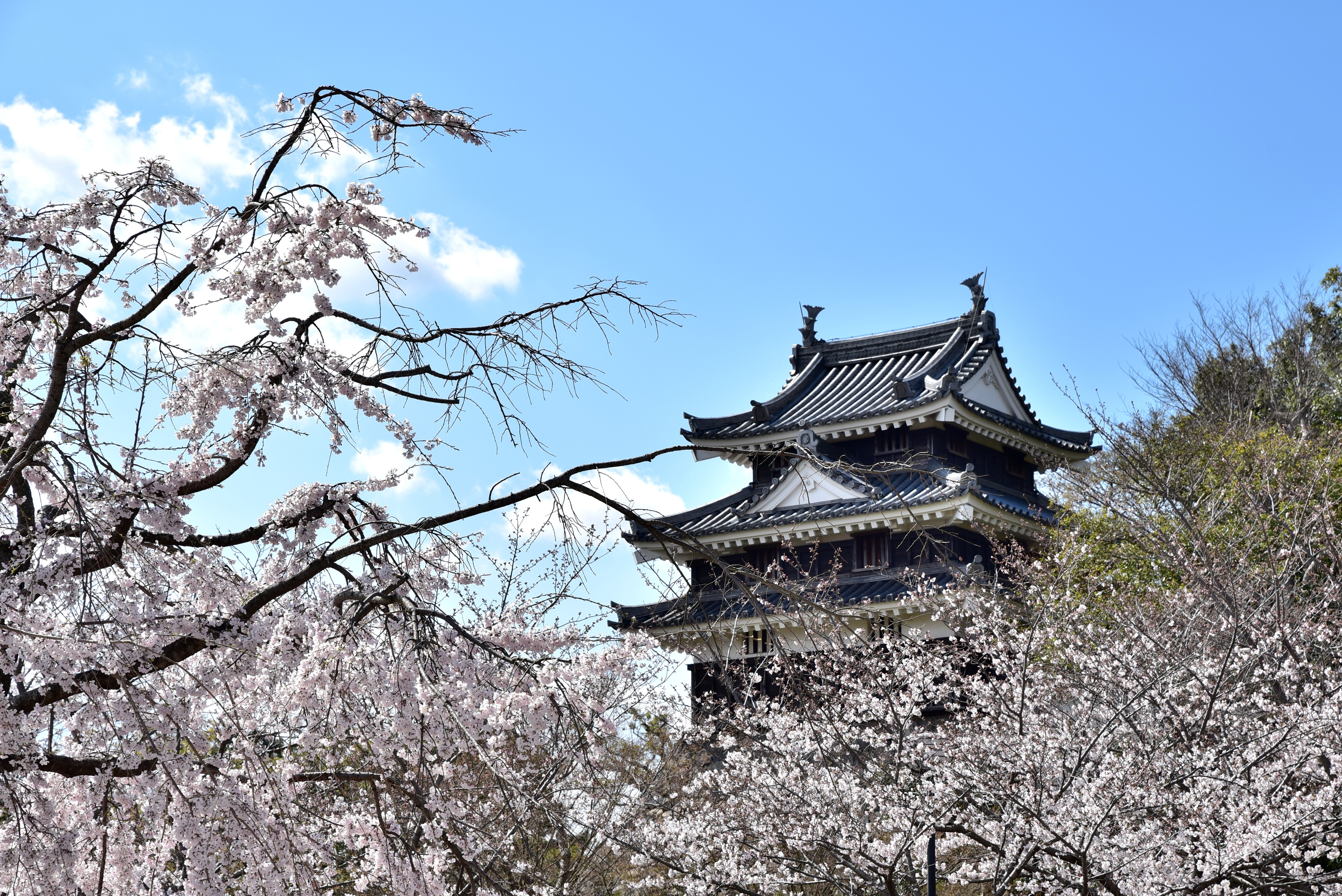
- Reconstructed Ushitora Yagura of Nishio Castle

Site information
- Type: flatland-style Japanese castle
- Owner: reconstructed 1996
- Open to the public: yes

Location

Site history
- Built: 1585
- Built by: Sakai Shigetada
- In use: Edo period
- Demolished: 1872

Nishio Castle (西尾城, Nishio-jō) is a Japanese castle located in the city of Nishio, eastern Aichi Prefecture, Japan. At the end of the Edo period, Nishio Castle was home to the Ogyu Matsudaira, daimyō of Nishio Domain. The castle was also known as Tsuru-jō (鶴城), Tsuruga-jō (鶴ヶ城), or Saijo-jō (西条城).

== History ==
Nishio Castle dates to the Kamakura period with a fortification called Saijō-jō was built by Ashikaga Yoshiuji in around 1221. The Saijō was a cadet branch of the Ashikaga clan and late changed their name to "Kira", serving the Sunpu-based Imagawa clan. After the Battle of Okehazama in 1600, the castle was captured by Tokugawa Ieyasu. He assigned it to one of his generals, Sakai Shigetada, who rebuilt it with moats, stone walls, several yagura, gates and a donjon. After the transfer of the Tokugawa clan to the Kanto region by Toyotomi Hideyoshi, the castle was assigned to one of Hideyoshi's generals, Tanaka Yoshimasa, who was also castellan of Okazaki Castle.

Tanaka Yoshimasa dismantled the existing donjon and built a much larger three-story tower at the edge of the second bailey, facing the front of the castle. The reason for this unusual orientation is unknown; possibly due to space limitations, and possibly to impress his authority over the jōkamachi. The castle also had a secondary three-story donjon and ten corner yagura, which made it very well-equipped considering its size and the kokudaka of the territory. Following the establishment of the Tokugawa shogunate, the castle became the headquarters of Nishio Domain, which changed hands many times during the Edo period between several fudai daimyō houses.

The castle was dismantled in 1872, following the Meiji Restoration, and the inner bailey became a public park. Two of the original gates were left in situ. In 1996, a three-story yagura in central area and the main gate to secondary area was reconstructed along with a local history museum, and in 2014, the base of main donjon and stone walls of secondary area were also rebuilt

== Literature ==
- Schmorleitz, Morton S. (1974). Castles in Japan. Tokyo: Charles E. Tuttle Co. pp. 144–145. ISBN 0-8048-1102-4.
- Motoo, Hinago (1986). Japanese Castles. Tokyo: Kodansha. p. 200 pages. ISBN 0-87011-766-1.
- Mitchelhill, Jennifer (2004). Castles of the Samurai: Power and Beauty. Tokyo: Kodansha. p. 112 pages. ISBN 4-7700-2954-3.
- Turnbull, Stephen (2003). Japanese Castles 1540-1640. Osprey Publishing. p. 64 pages. ISBN 1-84176-429-9.
