= Nishio =

Nishio 西尾市
- City
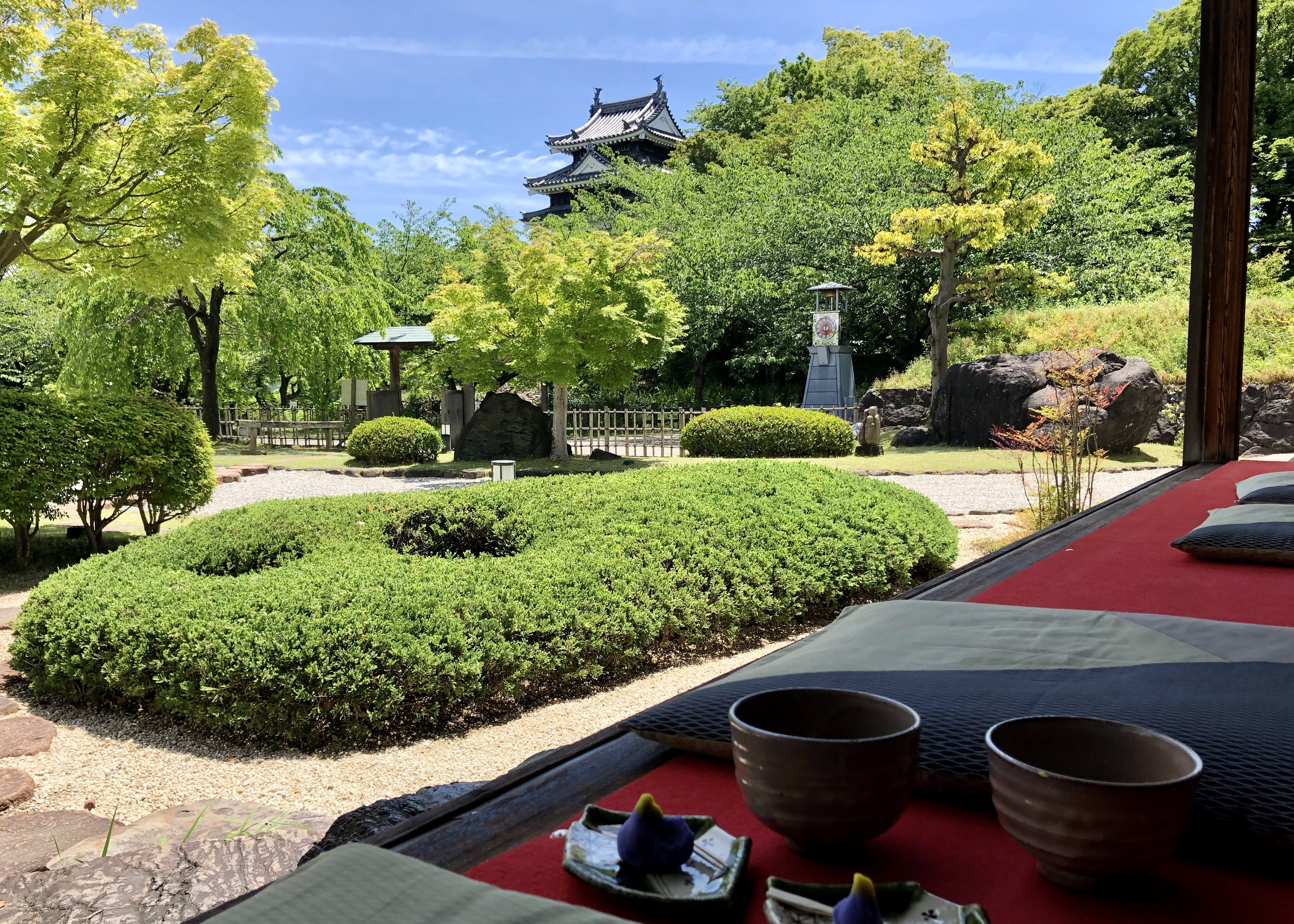
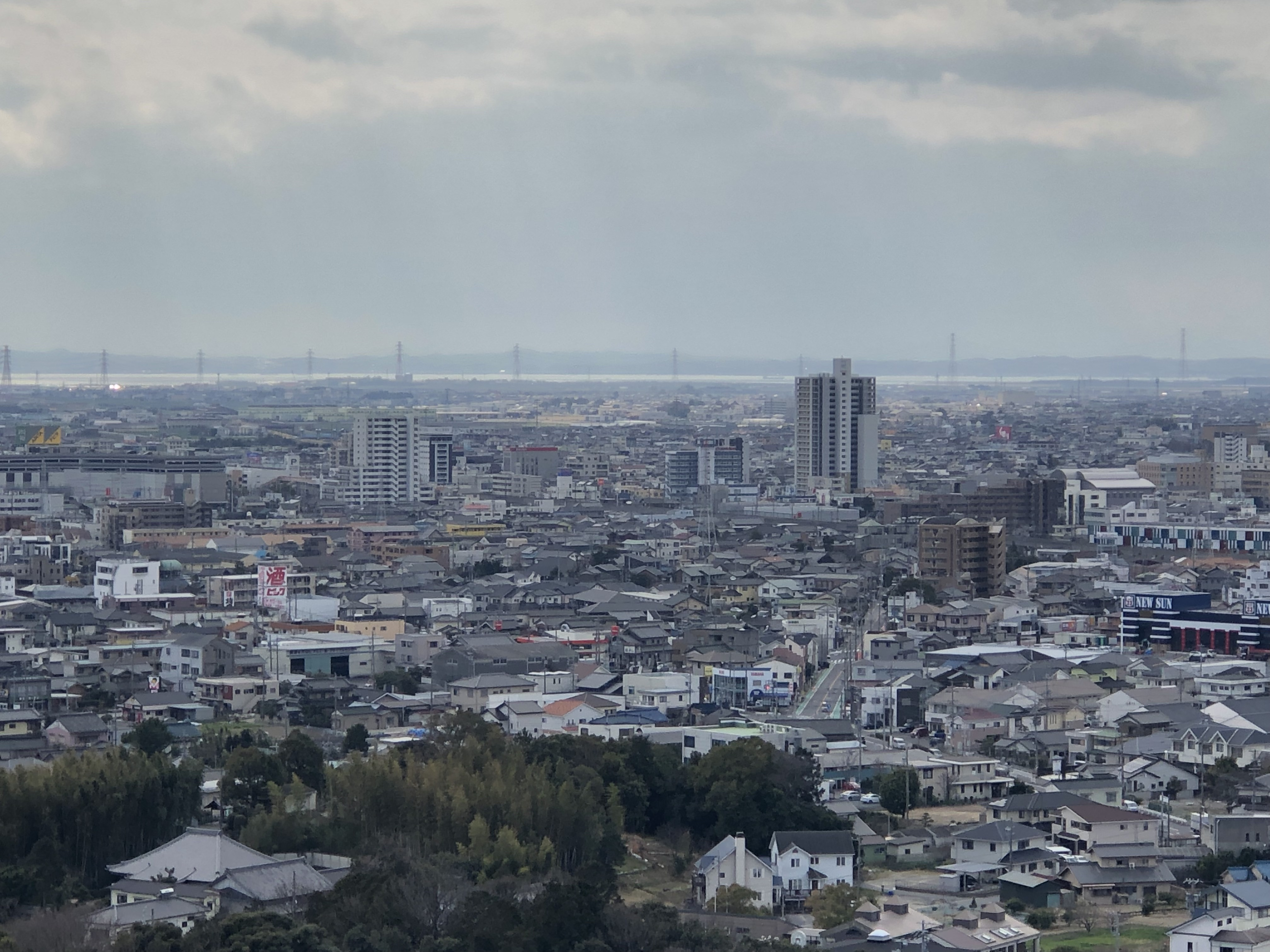
- Upper：Nishio Castle; Lower：Skyline of Nishio

- Flag Emblem
- Location of Nishio in Aichi Prefecture

- Coordinates: 34°49′48″N 137°04′11″E
- Country: Japan
- Region: Chūbu (Tōkai)
- Prefecture: Aichi

Government
  - Mayor: Ken Nakamura (since 2017)

Area
  - Total: 161.22 km^{2} (62.25 sq mi)

Population (October 1, 2019)
  - Total: 169,984
  - Density: 1,054.4/km^{2} (2,730.8/sq mi)
- Time zone: UTC+9 (Japan Standard Time)
- Tree: Camphor laurel
- Flower: Rose
- Phone number: 0563-56-2111
- Address: 22 Yorizumichō Shimoda, Nishio-shi, Aichi-ken 445-8501
- Website: Official website

Nishio (西尾市, Nishio-shi) is a city located in Aichi Prefecture, in the Chūbu region of Japan. As of 1 October 2019, the city had an estimated population of 169,984 in 65,553 households, with a population density of 1,054 persons per km^{2}. The total area of the city was 160.22 square kilometres (61.86 sq mi). It is a regional commercial and manufacturing center and the country's leading producer of powdered green tea.

== Geography ==
Nishio is situated on the northern coast of Mikawa Bay on the Pacific Ocean in southern Aichi Prefecture. The city lies along the eastern bank of the Yahagi River. Sheltered by Chita Peninsula and Atsumi Peninsula, the local climate is mild. Parts of the city lie within the borders of the Mikawa Wan Quasi-National Park

=== Climate ===
The city has a climate characterized by hot and humid summers, and relatively mild winters (Köppen climate classification Cfa). The average annual temperature in Nishio is 15.7 °C. The average annual rainfall is 1596 mm with September as the wettest month. The temperatures are highest on average in August, at around 26.3 °C, and lowest in January, at around 4.5 °C. Gamagōri, Aichi is the closest point that records statistical climate information.

Climate data for Gamagōri, Aichi (1971–2000)
| Month | Jan | Feb | Mar | Apr | May | Jun | Jul | Aug | Sep | Oct | Nov | Dec | Year |
|---|---|---|---|---|---|---|---|---|---|---|---|---|---|
| Mean daily maximum °C (°F) | 9.2 (48.6) | 9.7 (49.5) | 13.2 (55.8) | 18.5 (65.3) | 22.7 (72.9) | 25.5 (77.9) | 29.2 (84.6) | 30.9 (87.6) | 27.4 (81.3) | 22.2 (72.0) | 17.1 (62.8) | 11.9 (53.4) | 19.8 (67.6) |
| Daily mean °C (°F) | 5.3 (41.5) | 5.5 (41.9) | 8.9 (48.0) | 14.2 (57.6) | 18.5 (65.3) | 21.9 (71.4) | 25.5 (77.9) | 26.9 (80.4) | 23.6 (74.5) | 18.3 (64.9) | 13.1 (55.6) | 8.0 (46.4) | 15.8 (60.4) |
| Mean daily minimum °C (°F) | 2.0 (35.6) | 1.9 (35.4) | 4.9 (40.8) | 10.1 (50.2) | 14.7 (58.5) | 18.8 (65.8) | 22.6 (72.7) | 23.8 (74.8) | 20.7 (69.3) | 14.9 (58.8) | 9.6 (49.3) | 4.5 (40.1) | 12.4 (54.3) |
| Average precipitation mm (inches) | 47.9 (1.89) | 59.2 (2.33) | 135.9 (5.35) | 149.5 (5.89) | 178.7 (7.04) | 231.5 (9.11) | 175.3 (6.90) | 157.5 (6.20) | 257.2 (10.13) | 127.8 (5.03) | 93.0 (3.66) | 38.9 (1.53) | 1,649.8 (64.95) |
| Mean monthly sunshine hours | 169.3 | 173.6 | 192.9 | 196.4 | 190.9 | 137.0 | 163.9 | 215.4 | 150.4 | 168.3 | 169.2 | 183.9 | 2,110.7 |

=== Demographics ===
Per Japanese census data, the population of Nishio has been increased steadily over the past 70 years.

Historical population
| Year | Pop. | ±% |
|---|---|---|
| 1950 | 121,300 | — |
| 1960 | 122,726 | +1.2% |
| 1970 | 130,913 | +6.7% |
| 1980 | 146,010 | +11.5% |
| 1990 | 155,559 | +6.5% |
| 2000 | 159,788 | +2.7% |
| 2010 | 165,298 | +3.4% |
| 2020 | 169,046 | +2.3% |

=== Surrounding municipalities ===
(Aichi Prefecture) Aichi prefecture

- Anjō
- Gamagōri
- Hekinan
- Kōta
- Okazaki

== History ==
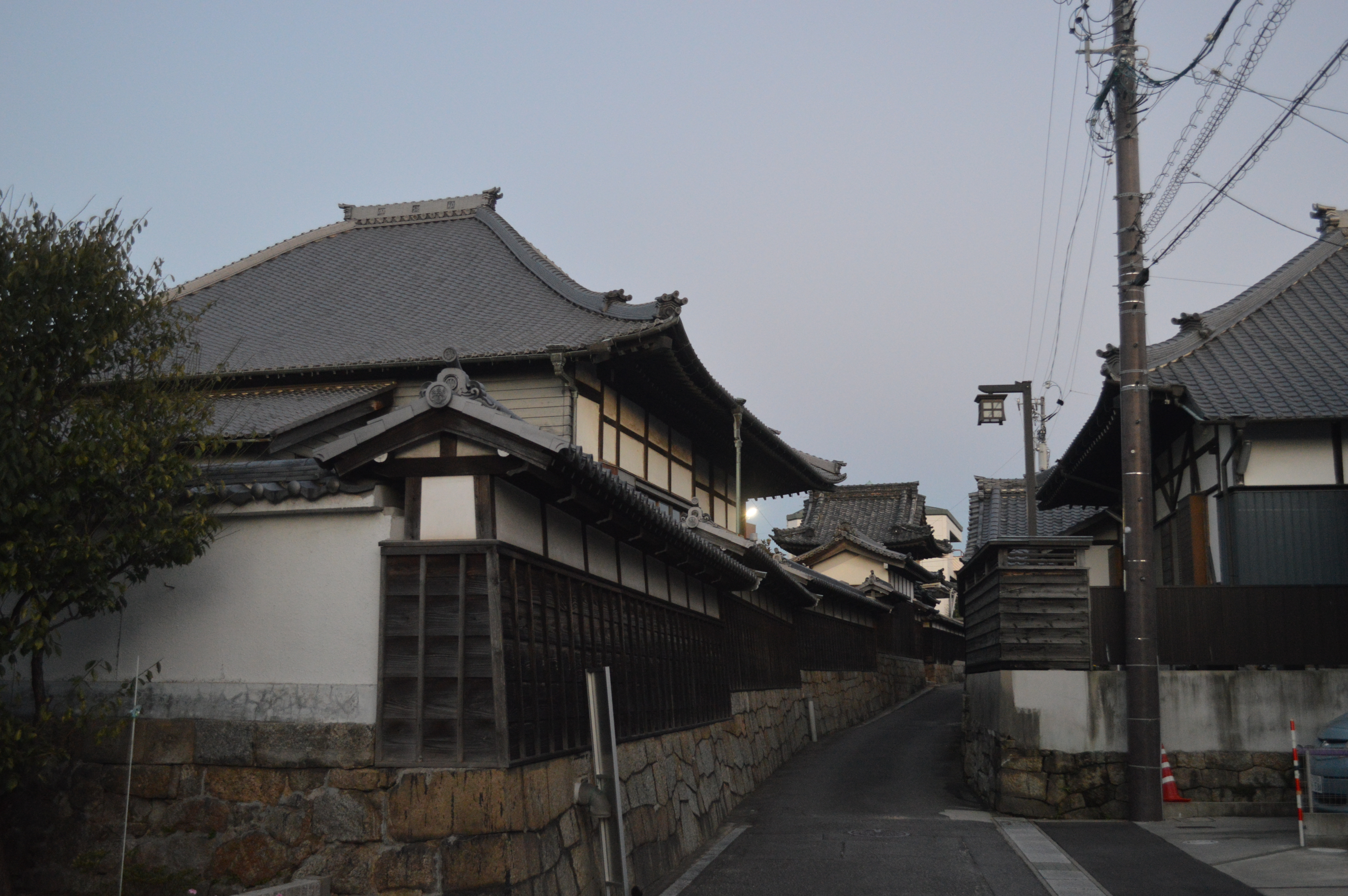
Nishio Castle Jōkamachi (Junkaimachi Town)

=== Origin ===
The Mikawa area has been inhabited since prehistoric times, as attested by finds of pottery shards from the Jōmon period and the megalithic Kofun tomb in Kira, the oldest in the Mikawa Province.

=== Ancient history ===
The fertile plains along the Yahagi River have been used for rice-farming as well as the production of tea and cotton since ancient times. Shell mounds dating to the late Japanese Paleolithic period which have been found in what is today the town center also point to fish and seafood as important early local produce.

In Hazu, a shrine from the Nara period is evidence of an early cultural connection to the Japanese capital at the time. The soil around Nishio is rich in mica deposits, which was already mined in the Nara period.

=== Early modern period ===
During the 15th century Sengoku period, Nishio was the home territory for the Sakai clan, based at Nishio Castle. The area eventually came under the control of the Tokugawa clan, and during the Edo period, most of the area was ruled as the Nishio Domain, a minor fudai feudal domain under the Tokugawa shogunate. The area prospered as a fishing port, and due to its location on the Tōkaidō highway connecting Edo with Kyoto, although the town itself suffered heavy damage due to a tsunami in the 1707 Hōei earthquake.

=== Late modern period ===
Early in the Meiji period, with the establishment of the modern municipalities system, Nishio was proclaimed a village in Hazu District in 1871. Following the 1891 Mino–Owari earthquake, a tsunami killed over 60 people. Nishio was elevated to town status on May 1, 1906. The town suffered damage in the 1944 Tōnankai earthquake, which killed 32 people, and the 1945 Mikawa earthquake, which killed 765.

=== Contemporary history ===
After the end of World War II, Nishio attracted many workers from the rural south of Japan and its population increased. In 1953, Nishio became a city with the annexation of neighboring Heisaka and Terazu towns and Fukuchi and Muroba villages; followed by Miwa and Meiji villages in 1955. In 1959, Typhoon Vera caused considerable damage to the area, with 20 people killed.

On April 1, 2011, the towns of Hazu, Isshiki and Kira (all from Hazu District) were merged into Nishio. Hazu District was dissolved as a result of this merger.

== Government ==
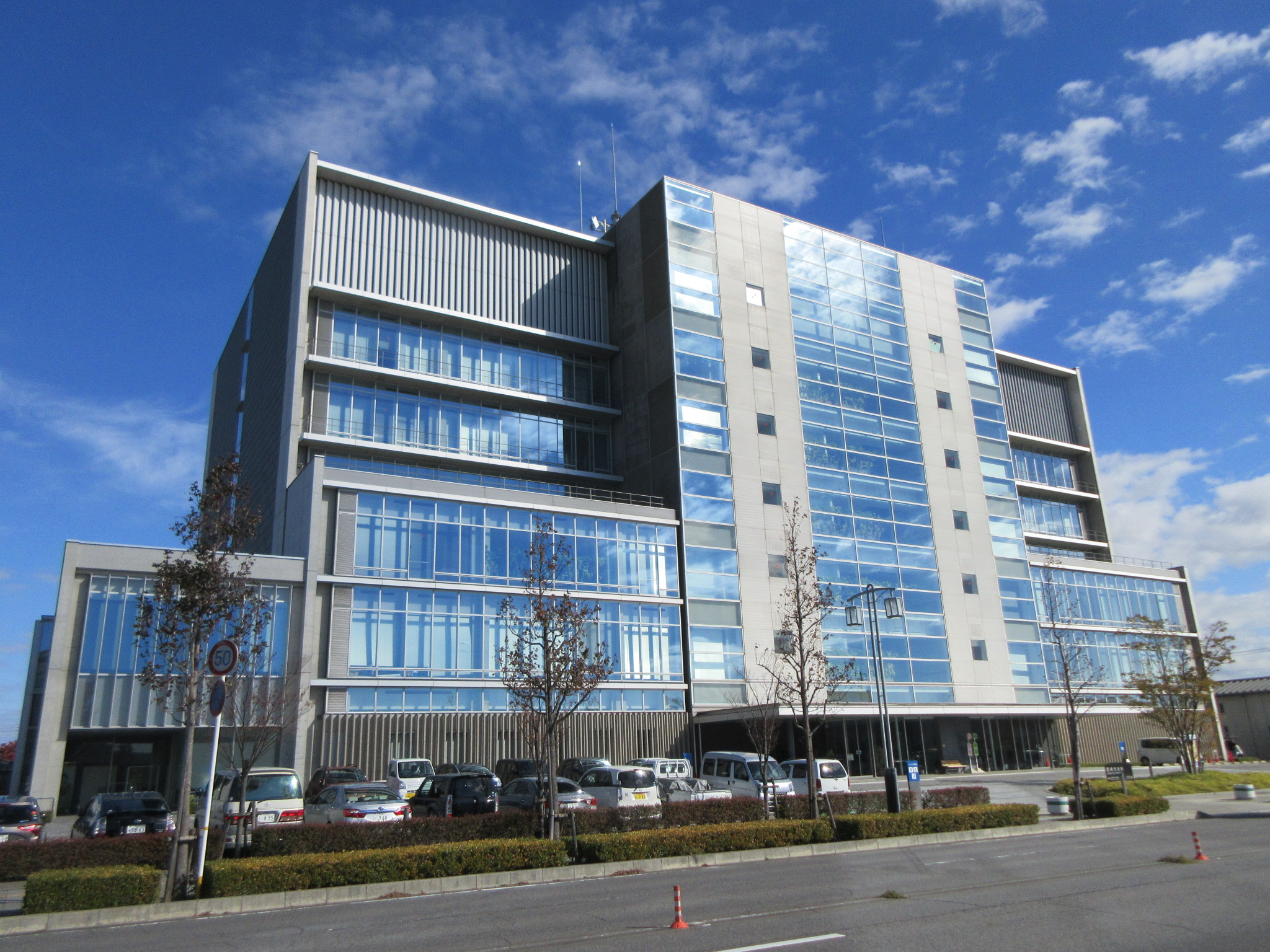
Nishio city Hall

Nishio has a mayor-council form of government with a directly elected mayor and a unicameral city legislature of 30 members. The city contributes two members to the Aichi Prefectural Assembly. In terms of national politics, the city is part of Aichi District 12 of the lower house of the Diet of Japan.

== Public services ==
=== Administration ===
Nishio's City Hall is located in Chodacho, about half a mile to the south-east of Nishio Station. Its foreign residents section offers assistance in Chinese, Korean, Portuguese, Spanish and English.

=== Garbage disposal ===
The Clean Center recycling plant in Kenjoda accepts all kinds of garbage, including bulky items and hazardous waste.

=== Health care ===
Nishio's main hospital is the Nishio Municipal Hospital in central Nishio, near Yatsuomote-yama.

== Sister cities ==
=== International ===
Sister city

- Porirua, New Zealand, since December 15, 1993

=== National ===
Friendship city

- Echizen, Fukui Prefecture, since 2000
- Ena, Gifu Prefecture, since 1998
- Yonezawa, Yamagata Prefecture, since December 15, 2013

== Economy ==
=== Primary sector of the economy ===
==== Agriculture ====
Nishio is a regional commercial center and fishing port, with a mixed economy of light manufacturing and agriculture. It is also the largest producer of powdered green tea in Japan and one of the leading producers of Unagi eels. There is a public fish market at the fishing port in Isshiki.

=== Secondary sector of the economy ===
==== Manufacturing ====
Numerous suppliers to the Japanese automotive industry such as Denso and Aisin have production plants in and around Nishio.

==== Ceramic engineering ====
The soil around Nishio is rich in mica deposits, which was already mined in the Nara period. Yatsuomote ware is a type of Japanese pottery made at a kiln at the southern foot of Mount Yatsuomote (八ツ面山).

== Education ==
=== Schools ===
The city has 26 public elementary schools and 10 public junior high schools operated by the city government and five public high schools operated by the Aichi Prefectural Board of Education. Public libraries and community centers are maintained in central Nishio, Hazu, Isshiki, Kira and Terazu.

The Nishio International Association offers Japanese language classes as well as instruction in foreign languages; most of these are held at the Fukushi (Welfare) Center in Hananoki-Cho.

== Transportation ==
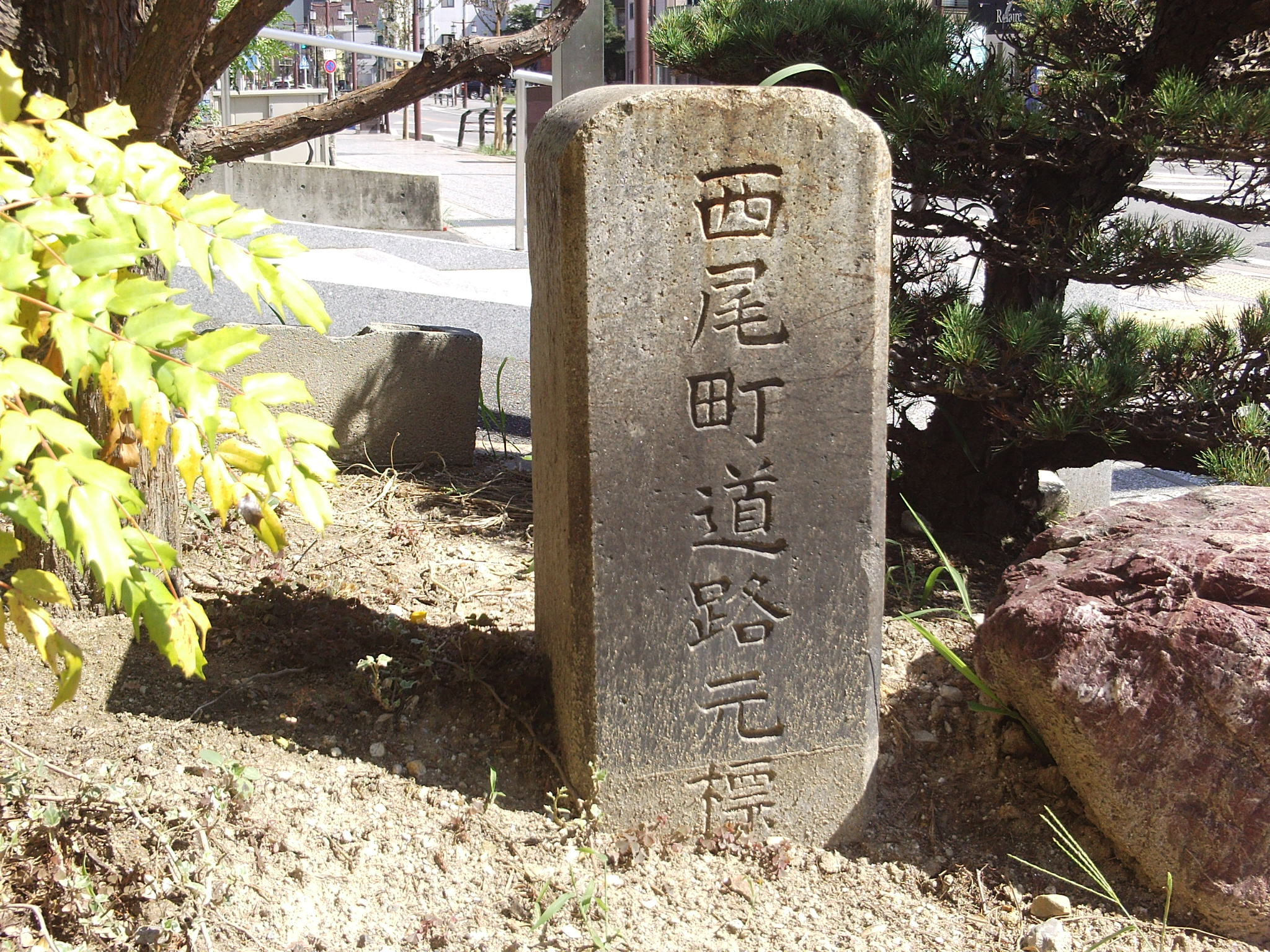
The Kilometre Zero of Nishio

=== Railways ===
==== Conventional lines ====
Meitetsu

- Meitetsu Nishio Line: - Yonezu - Sakuramachi-mae - Nishioguchi - Nishio - Fukuchi - Kami-Yokosuka - Kira-Yoshida

connects the city with Nagoya to the north, via Shin Anjo.

- Meitetsu Gamagōri Line: Kira-Yoshida - Mikawa-Toba - Nishi-Hazu - Higashi-Hazu - Kodomonokuni -

links Nishio with Gamagōri. Local stations in this direction are

=== Roads ===
==== Japan National Route ====
- National Route 23
- National Route 247

=== Seaways ===
==== Seaports ====
- Mikawa Issiki Port
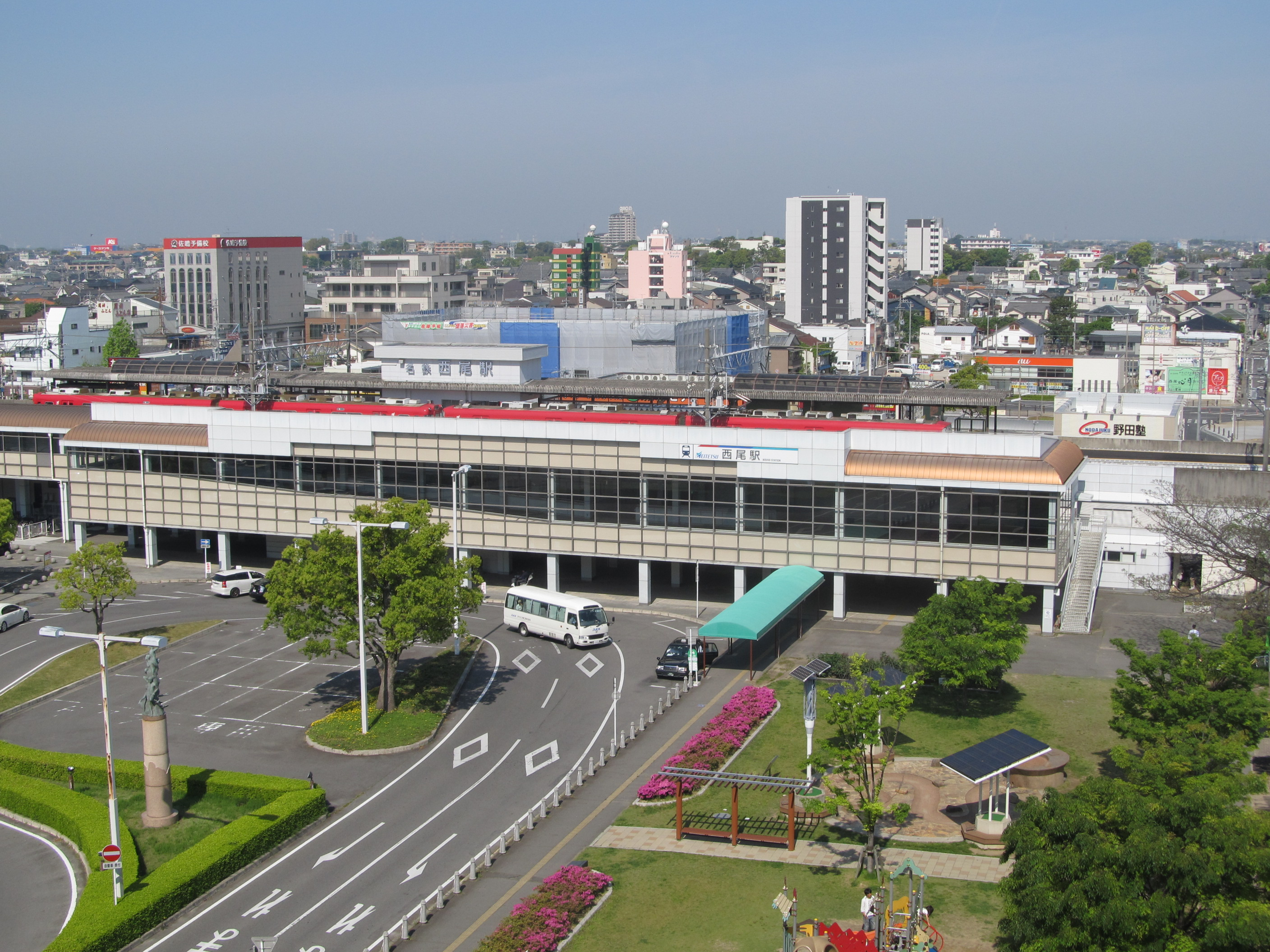
Nishio Station

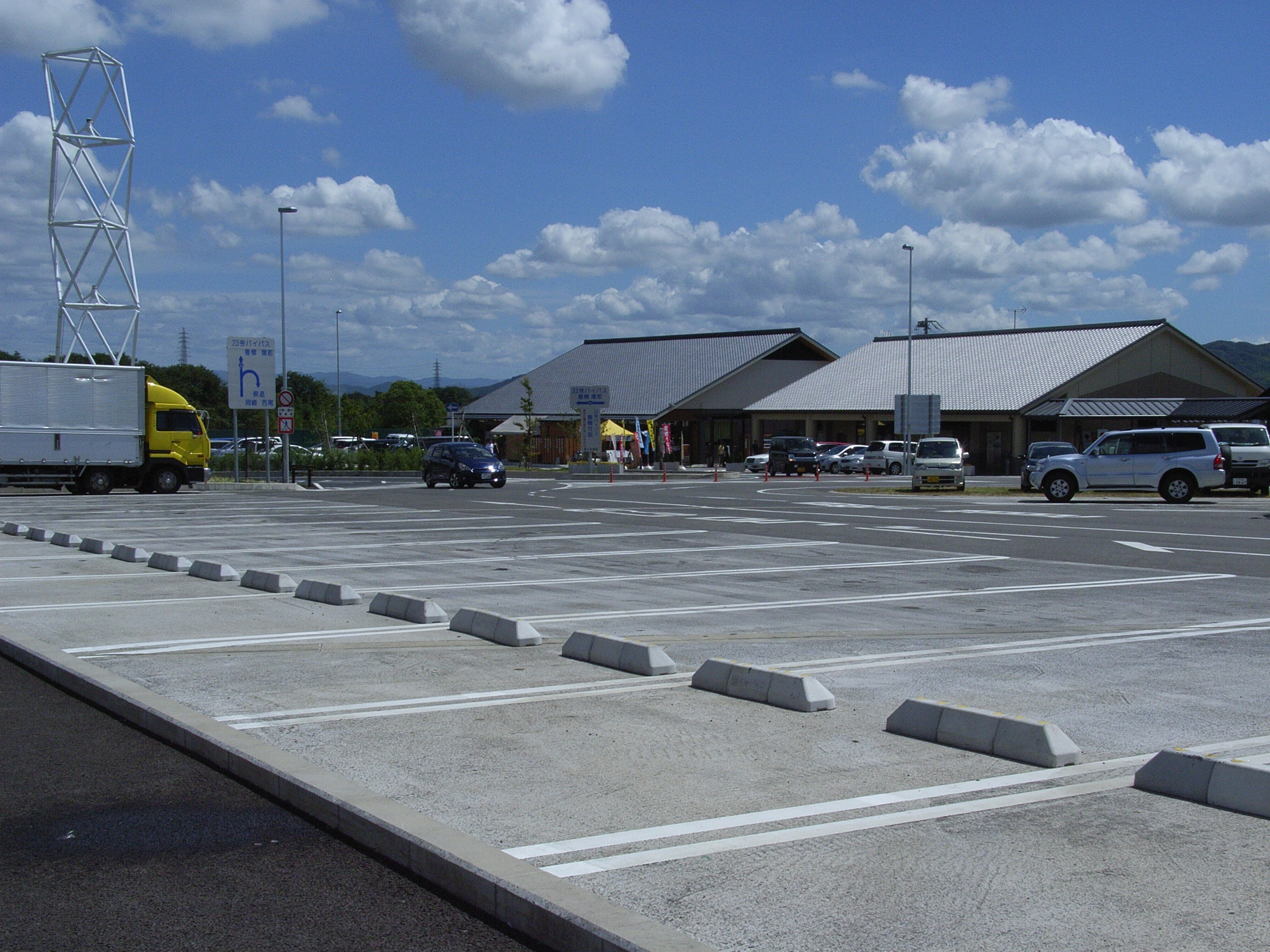
Road Station Nishio Okanoyama (Japan National Route 23)

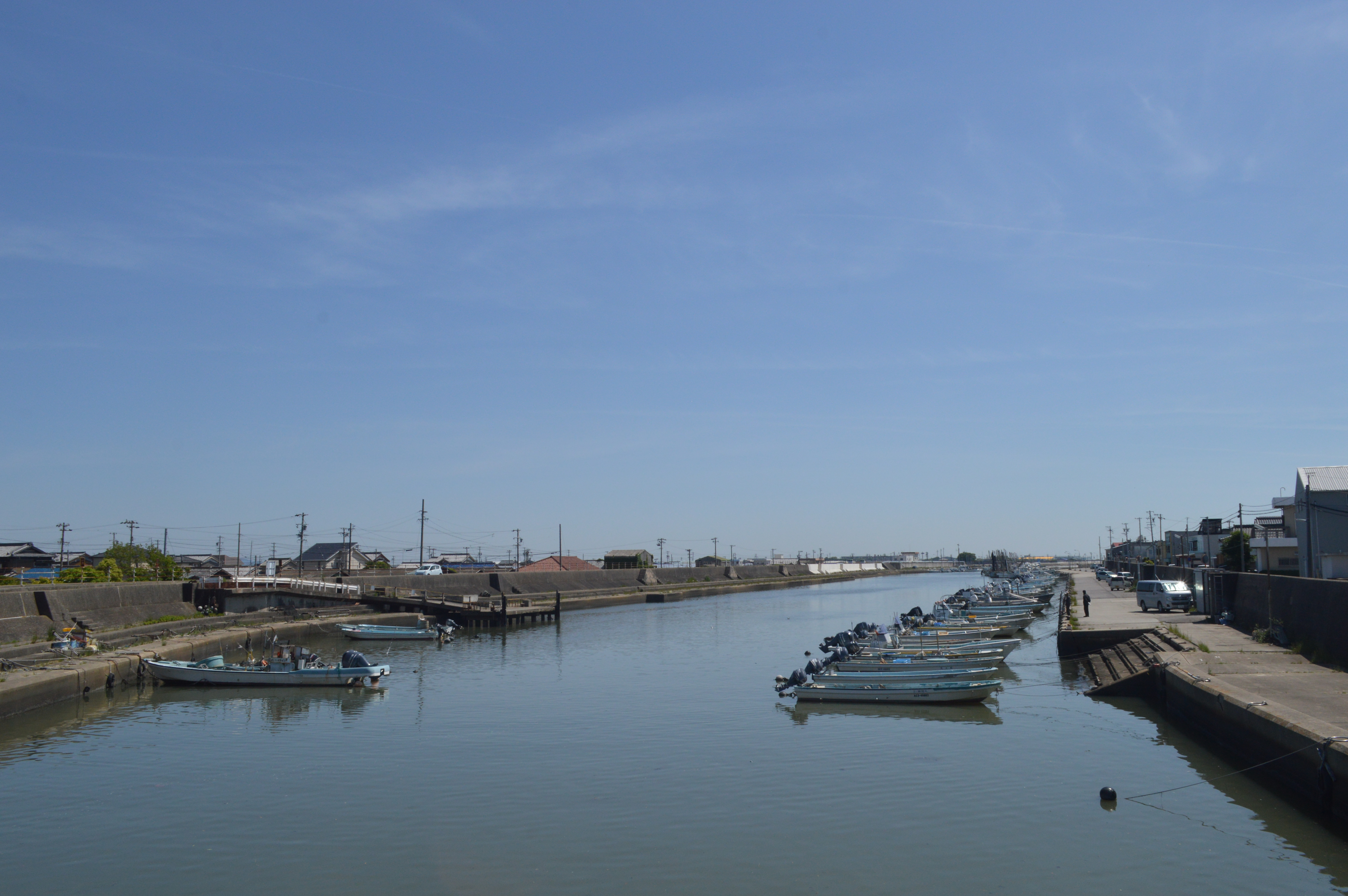
Mikawa Isshiki Port

== Local attractions ==
Nishio's sightseeing highlight is Ushitora Yagura Castle Keep in the downtown Yamashita-cho area. It features a full reconstruction of the wooden central tower, gates and central compound of Nishio Castle, built by the Matsudaira clan in 1221 and used until 1601.

Yatsuomote ware is a type of Japanese pottery started around 1825 by Katō Hachiemon (加藤八右衛門) when he opened his kiln at the southern foot of Mount Yatsuomote (八ツ面山). The soil around Nishio is rich in mica deposits, which was already mined in the Nara period. After an incident at Mount Yatsuomote a small bell was offered to soothe the kami. Katō Kumazō started a local tradition where small ceramic zodiac bells (きらら鈴) were made out of local mica kneaded into the clay, and after burning in the kiln the bell would make a pleasing sound when rung.

=== Landmarks ===
- Hirahara Waterfall and nature-trail, located in Hirahara-cho
- Kira Waikiki Beach: A series of sheltered sandy coves, open for bathing and watersports from June to September
- Sakushima: A small inhabited island with many traditional wooden buildings in Mikawa Bay, popular for fishing trips. Can be reached by ferry from Isshiki Harbor
- Mount Sangane, a spectacular forested mountain range overlooking Mikawa Bay, suitable for hiking and bird-watching
- Mount Yatsuomote, a hillside park in central Nishio, offering a good view of the surrounding cities, mountains and waterfront
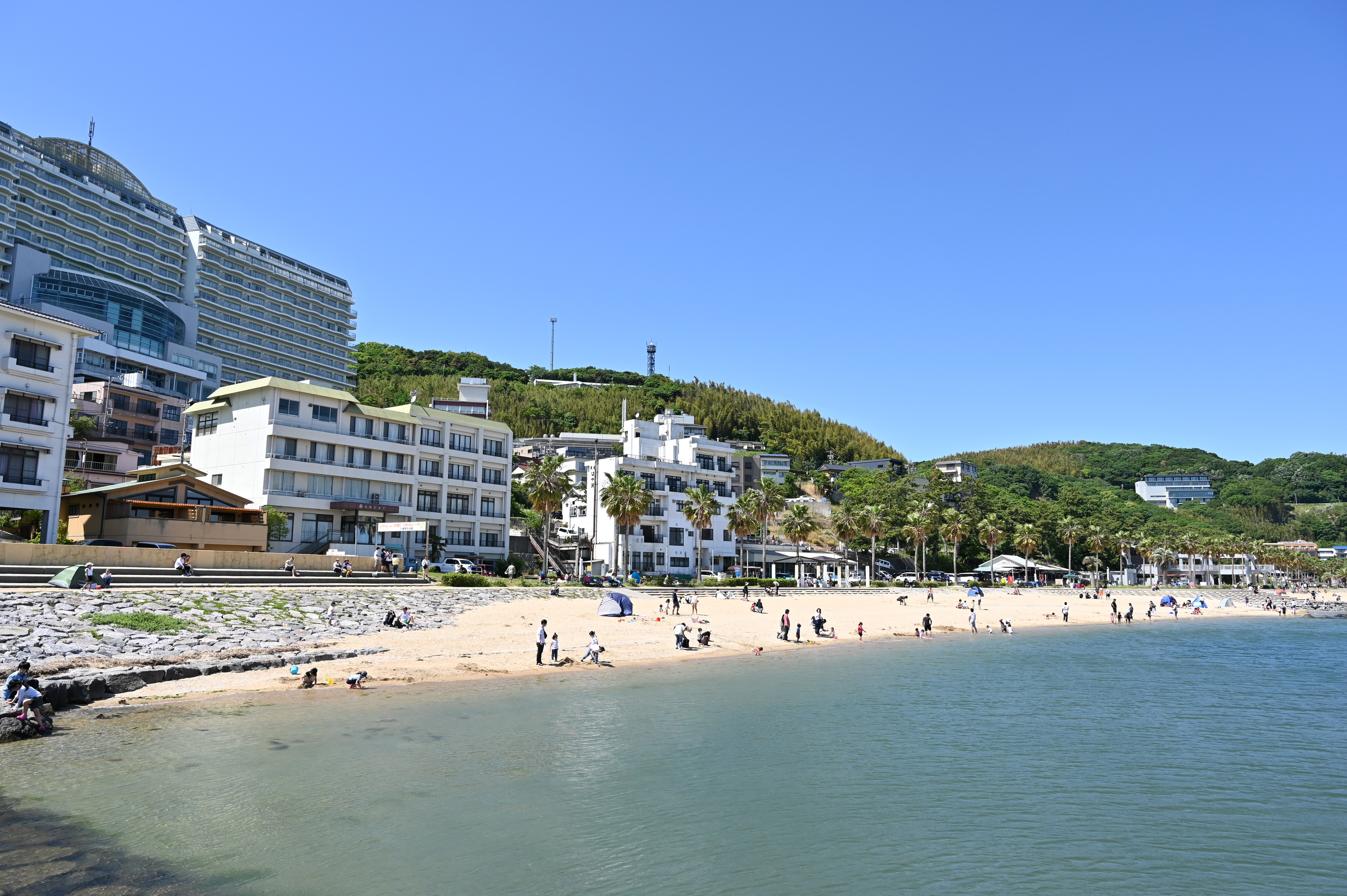
Kira Waikiki Beach

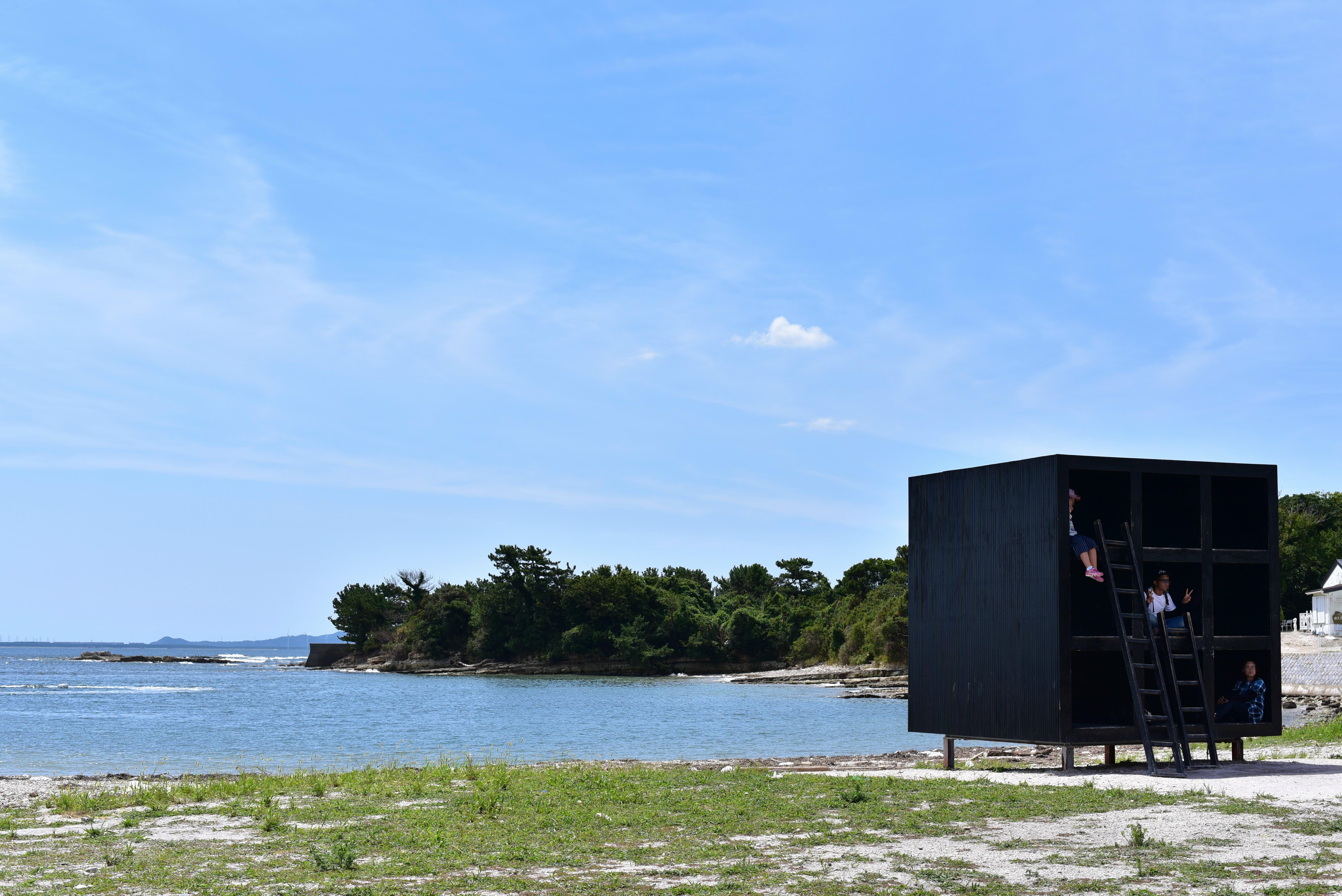
Installation Ohirune House in Sakushima

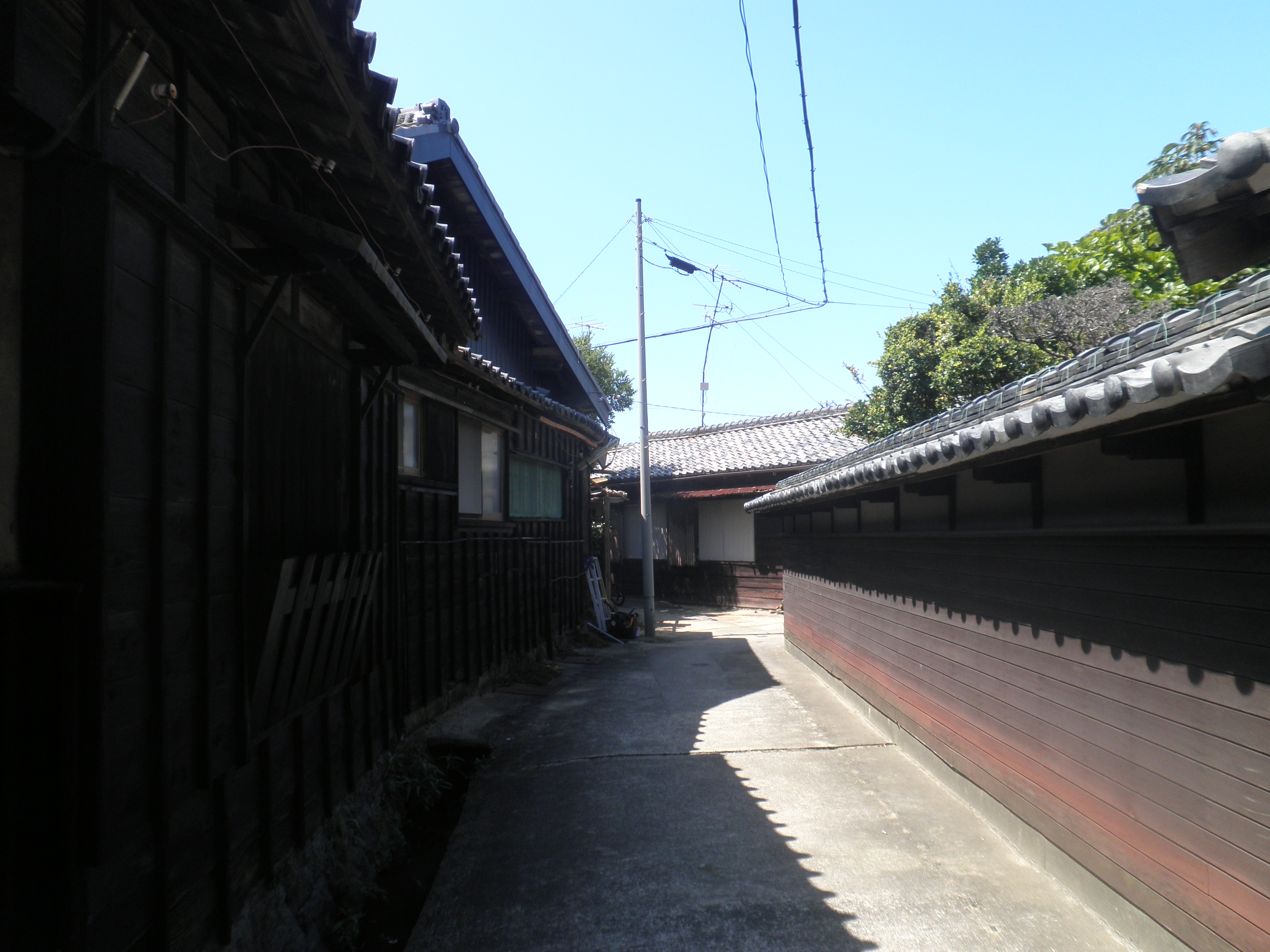
View of a street in Sakushima

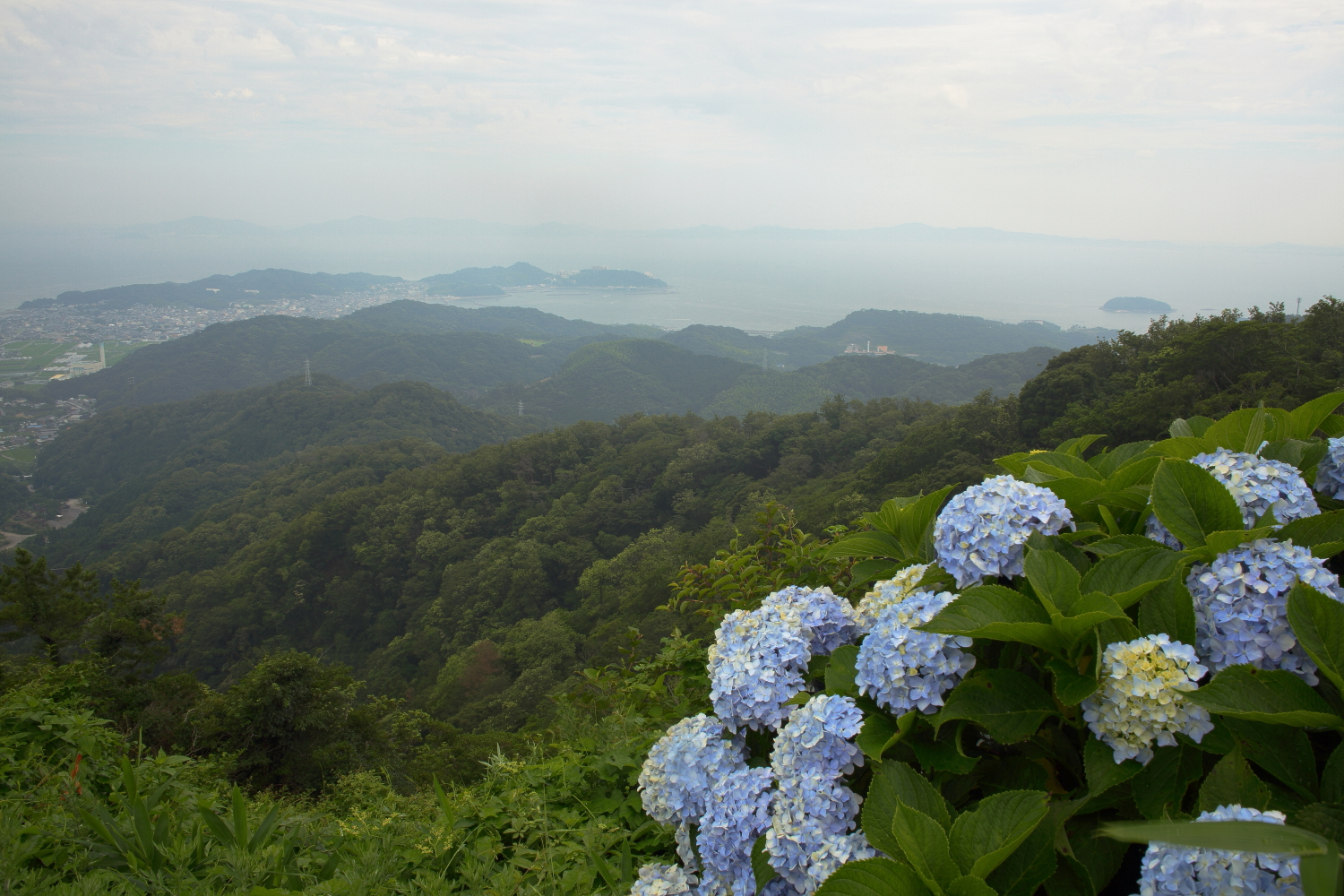
Mount Sangane skyline

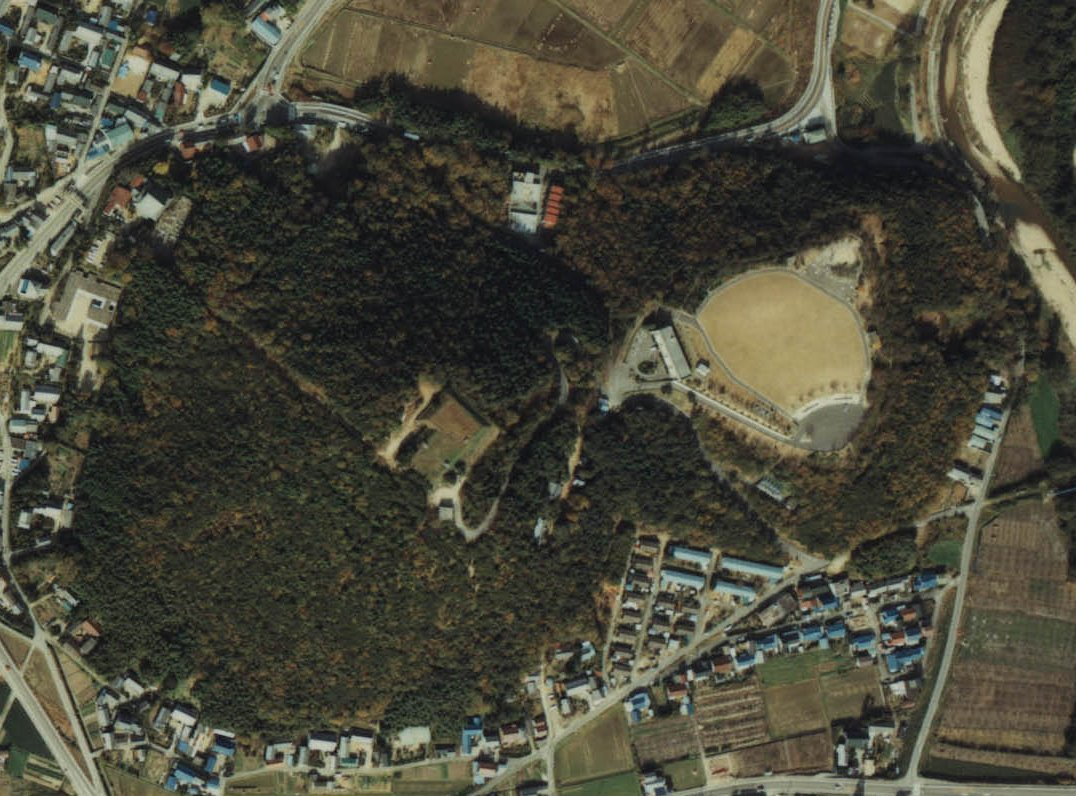
Aerial view of Mount Yatsuomote

=== Tourist attraction ===
Historic sites

- Iwase Bunko Library
- Konren-ji
- Nishio Castle
- Shōbōji Kofun, a National Historic Site

Parks

- Aichi Children Country
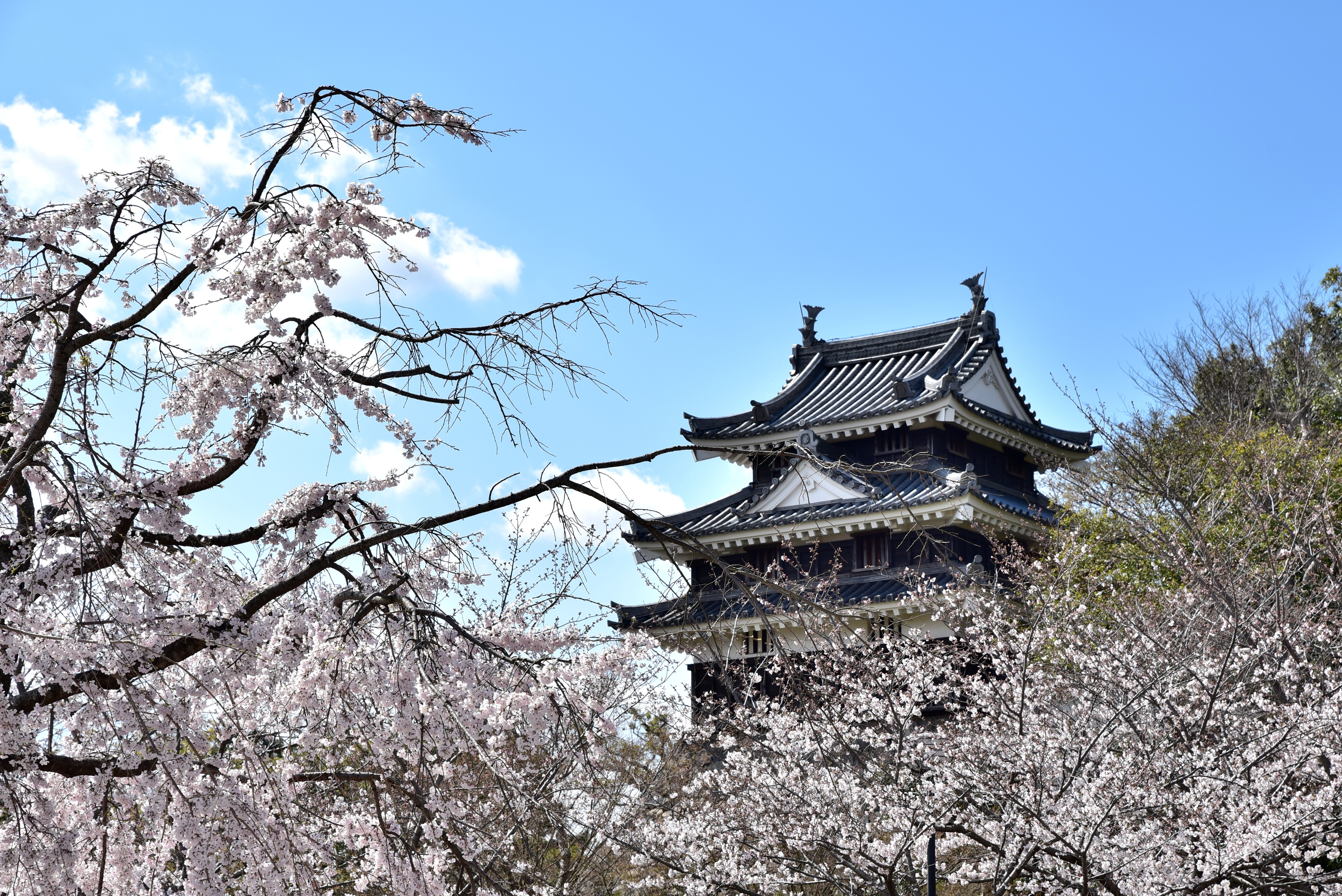
Nishio Castle

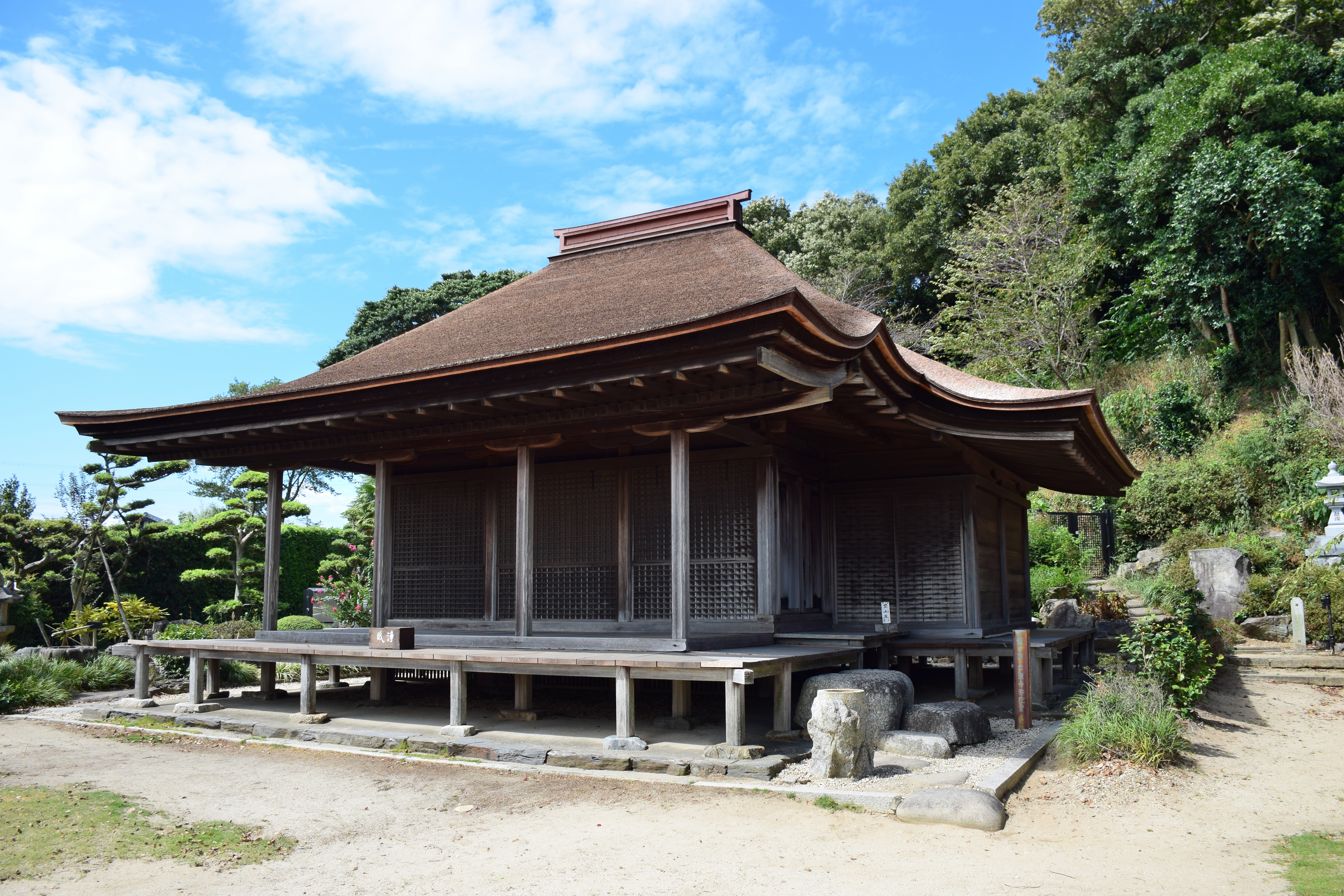
Konren-ji

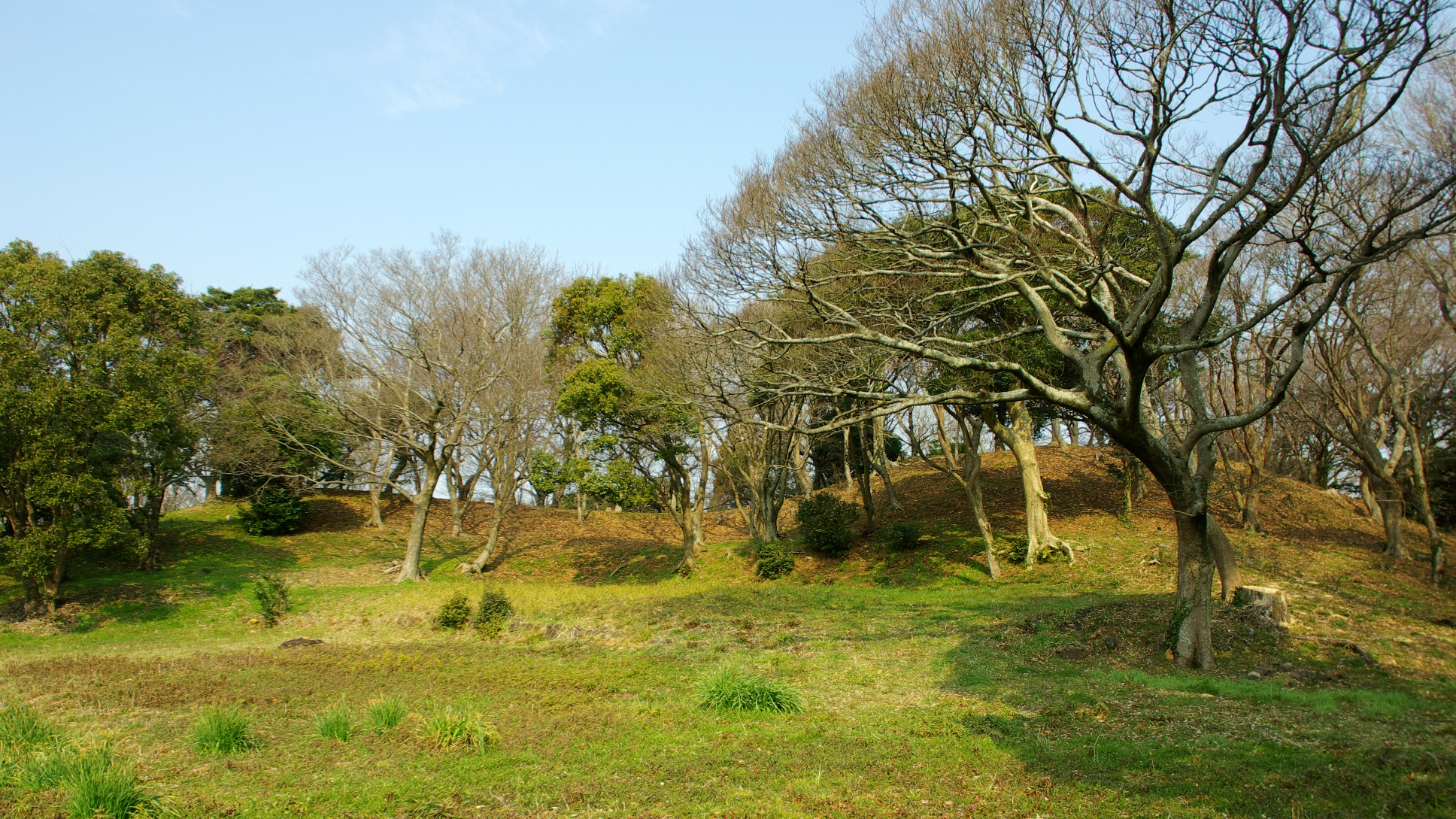
Shōbōji Kofun

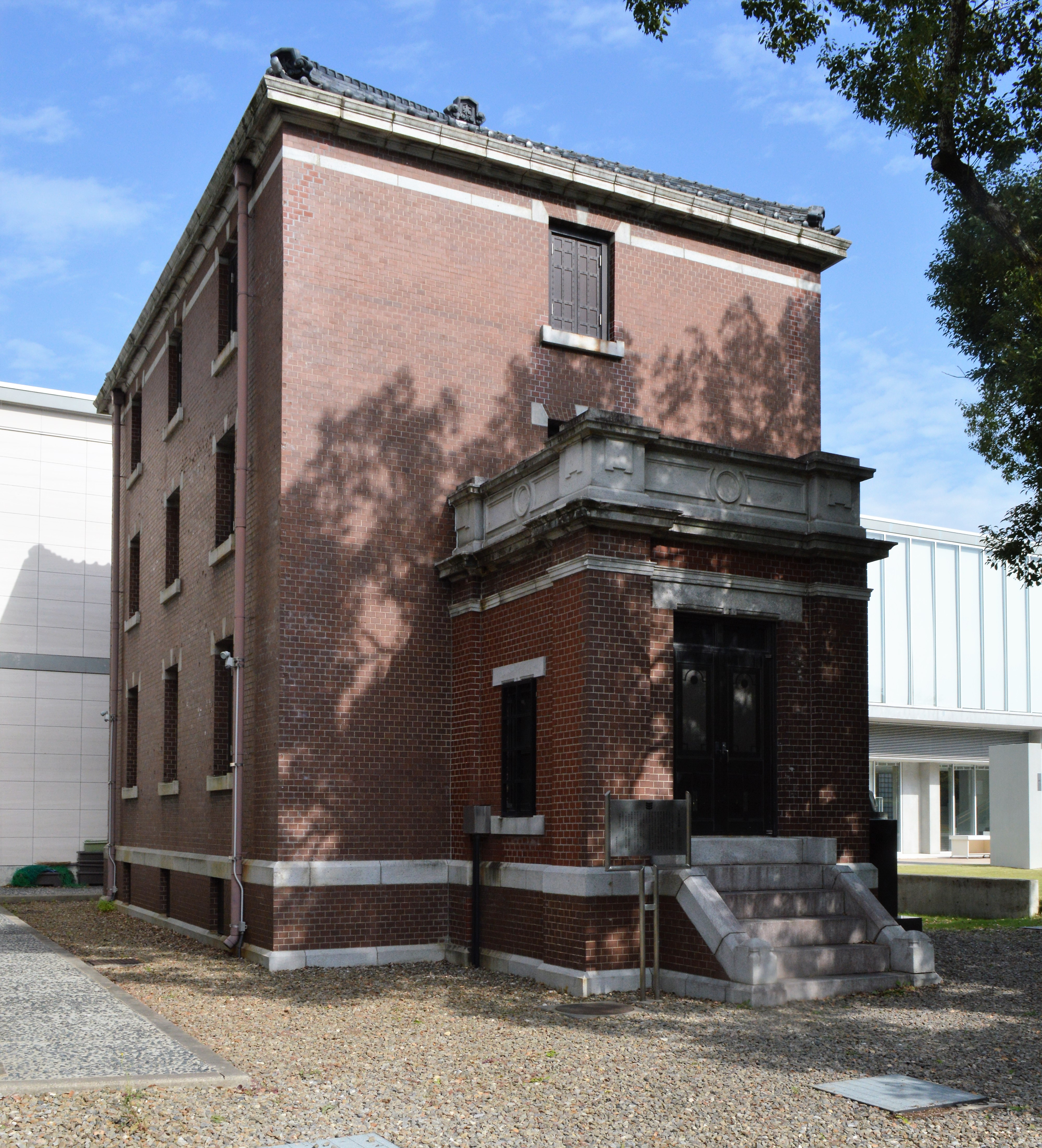
Iwase Bunko Library

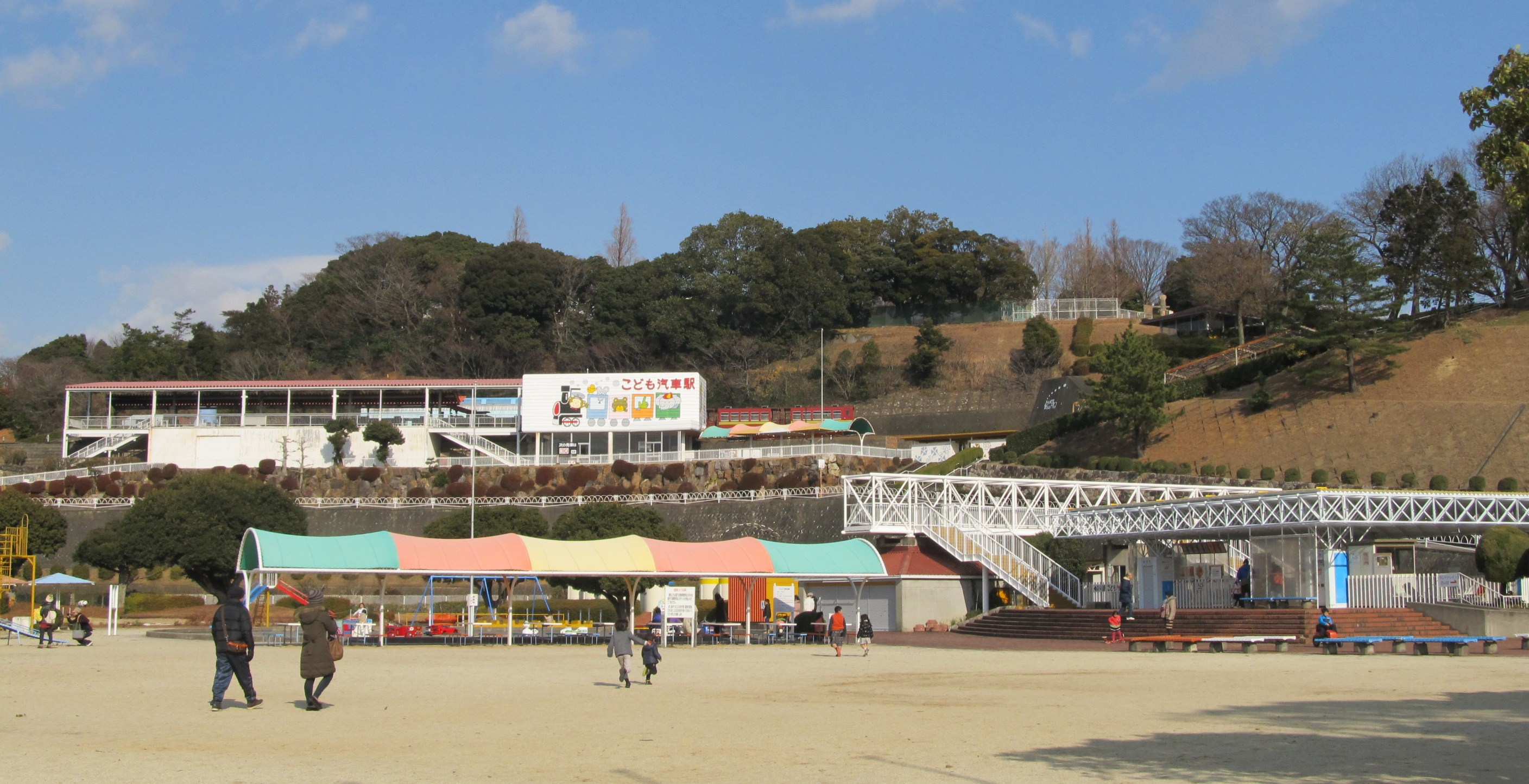
Aichi Children Country

=== Museums ===
The Nishio City Museum is located on the grounds of Nishio Castle. It has an extensive collection of items relating to local history and culture, dating from the ancient Jōmon period to the late Edo period.

The Iwase Bunko Library, next to the city library, is home to a collection of more than 80.000 rare books and ancient Buddhist manuscripts. It features an exposition hall and rooms for study and reading.

The Culture Center in Yamashita-cho provides a venue for concerts, theatre performances, exhibitions and lectures.

== Culture ==
=== Festivals ===
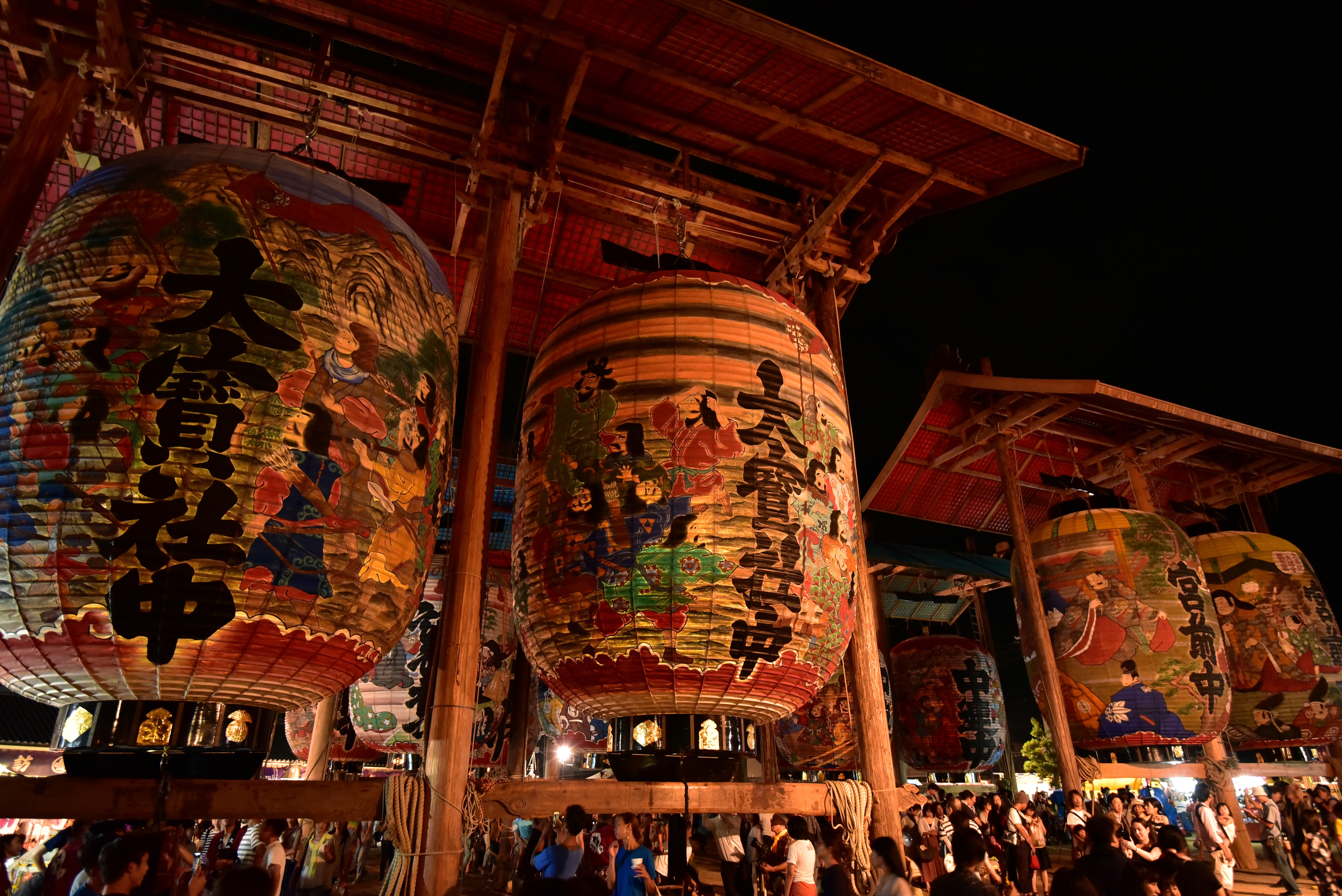
Isshiki Lantern Festival

Toba Fire Festival

A number of popular events and festivals are held in Nishio, most of them during the summer months.

- Toba Fire Festival: On the 2nd Sunday in February two teams of local men from Hazu and Kira vie to pull bamboo poles from a huge bonfire, a traditional rite meant to ensure a good harvest.
- Nishio Gion Festival: On the third weekend of July, a few days before the beginning of the school's summer holidays, Nishio celebrates a two-day city festival in the downtown Honmachi area, the main attraction of Nishio's festival season. Groups of residents parade through the streets performing choreographed dances called “odorocha” and yatai stalls sell sweets and snacks.
- Yonezu River Fireworks Festival: On August 15, more than 3000 fireworks are set off alongside the river near Yonezu Bridge, one of the most extravagant displays of pyrotechnics in the region.

Smaller local fireworks festivals are also held in Kira and Hazu in the month of August.

- Isshiki Lantern Festival: On August 26 and 27, large paper lanterns are on display amid food stalls selling local Unagi eel and other treats.
- Hawaiian Festival: At the end of August, Hawaiian and local groups perform traditional Polynesian dances on a stage at Kira Waikiki Beach.

=== Sports ===
White Wave sports center in Nishio Hazu Fureai Square features a 25m lap-pool, wave pool, waterslides and outdoor swimming areas. It is open year-round.

Public outdoor sporting grounds are found in Nishio Park, Yatsuomote Park, Yahagi River Park, Zenmyo Community Sports Park and Furukawa Green Park. The City, Tsurushiro and Chuo gymnasiums are available for private sport clubs and host a number of minor league teams for baseball, soccer, volleyball, basketball and other sports.

The Denso Airybees, a women's volleyball team playing in the V.Premier League are based in Nishio.

| Sex | Name | competition | League | Home | Sponsor | Since |
|---|---|---|---|---|---|---|
| Women | Denso Airybees | Volleyball | V.League (V1) | Nishio municipal general gymnasium | Aisin | 1953 |

== Notable events ==
In 2006, the city entered the Guinness Book of Records for having the largest simultaneous tea ceremony in the world at any one time with 14,718 participants. This record was later beaten by a tea party in Indore, India in 2008.

== Notable people ==
- Jitsuo Inagaki, politician
- Toshio Iwai, video game artist and musician
- Hitoki Iwase, professional baseball player
- Oguri Jukichi, Edo period castaway
- Koen Kondo, actor
- Mami Koyama, voice actress
- Maria Makino, idol singer (Morning Musume)
- Tetsuya Makita, actor
- Katsuya Takasu, plastic surgeon
