= Hazu =

Hazu 幡豆町
- Former municipality
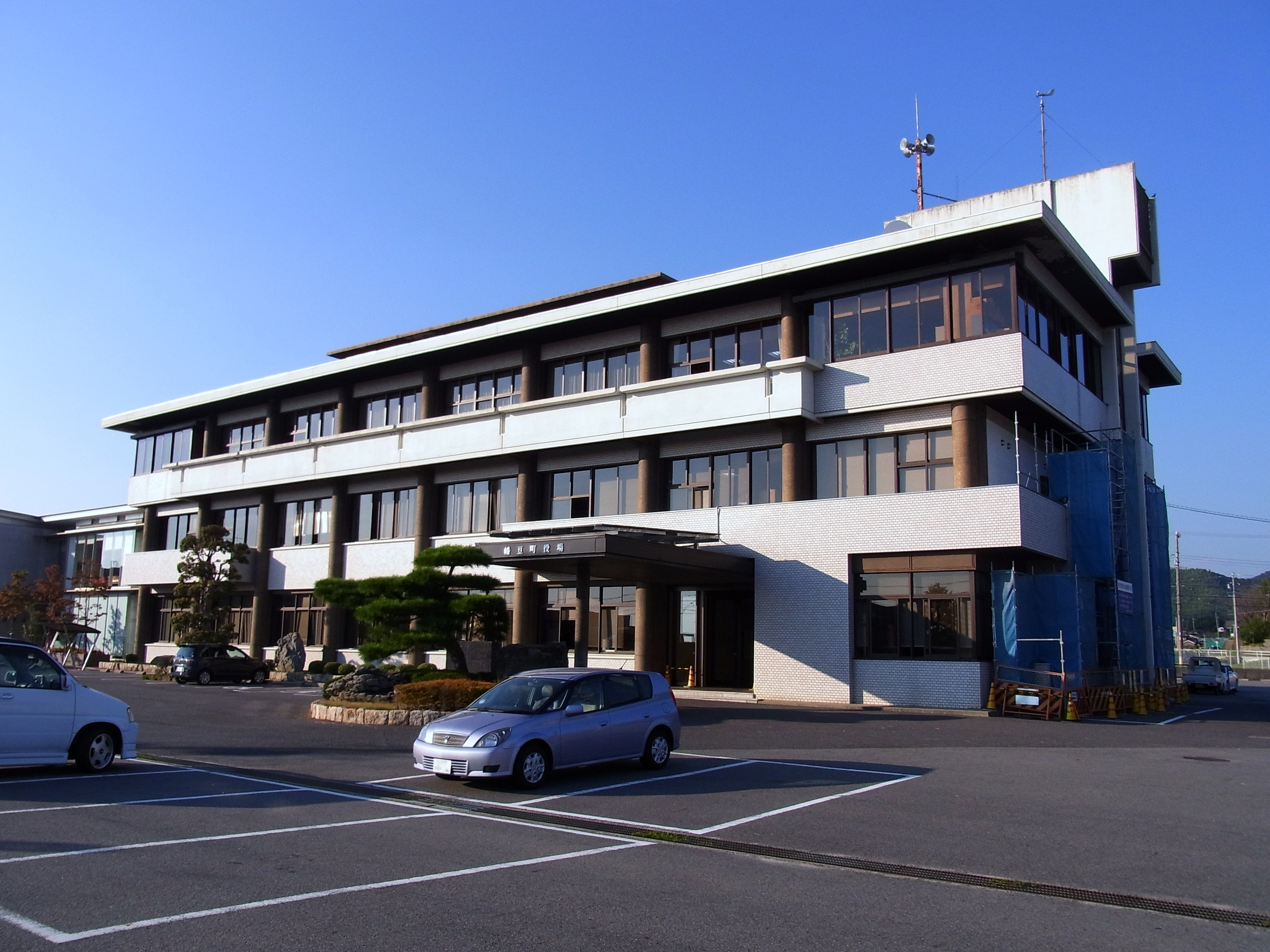
- former Hazu Town Hall

- Flag Emblem

- Location of Hazu in Aichi Prefecture

- Location in Japan
- Coordinates: 34°48′N 137°8′E
- Country: Japan
- Region: Chūbu (Tōkai)
- Prefecture: Aichi Prefecture
- District: Hazu
- Merged: April 1, 2011 (now part of Nishio)

Area
  - Total: 26.05 km^{2} (10.06 sq mi)

Population (February 1, 2010)
  - Total: 12,351
  - Density: 474.13/km^{2} (1,228.0/sq mi)
- Time zone: UTC+09:00 (JST)
- Symbols
- Flower: Azalea
- Tree: Myrica rubra

Hazu (幡豆町, Hazu-chō) was a town located in Hazu District, Aichi Prefecture, Japan.

As of May 1, 2004, the village had an estimated population of 12,351 and a population density of 474.13 persons per km^{2}. Its total area was 26.05 km^{2}.

Isshiki was a coastal settlement in southern Aichi Prefecture, on Mikawa Bay. The town economy was based on commercial fishing, and seasonal tourism, with parts of the town within the borders of the Mikawa Wan Quasi-National Park. The modern town was founded in 1889, and expanded in 1906 and 1926 by merging with adjacent villages. There is a theme park called "Aichi Kodomo no Kuni" (Aichi Children's Land) with a swimming pool, a camp, walking course, and a small zoo.

On April 1, 2011, Hazu, along with the towns of Isshiki and Kira (all from Hazu District), was merged into the expanded city of Nishio. Hazu District was dissolved as a result of this merger.
