= Kira, Aichi =

Kira 吉良町
- Former municipality
- Flag Emblem

- Location of Kira in Aichi Prefecture

- Location in Japan
- Coordinates: 34°48′N 137°4′E
- Country: Japan
- Region: Chūbu (Tōkai)
- Prefecture: Aichi Prefecture
- District: Hazu
- Merged: April 1, 2011 (now part of Nishio)

Area
  - Total: 35.98 km^{2} (13.89 sq mi)

Population (February 1, 2010)
  - Total: 22,280
  - Density: 619.2/km^{2} (1,604/sq mi)
- Time zone: UTC+09:00 (JST)
- Symbols
- Flower: Azalea
- Tree: Paulownia tomentosa

Kira (吉良町, Kira-chō) was a town located in Hazu District, Aichi Prefecture, Japan.

As of May 1, 2004, the town had an estimated population of 22,280 and a population density of 619.2 persons per km^{2}. Its total area was 35.98 km^{2}.

Kira was a coastal settlement in southern Aichi Prefecture, on Mikawa Bay. The town economy was based on commercial fishing and seasonal tourism. The town was founded in 1906, and expanded in March 1955 by merging with adjacent Yokosuka Village.

On April 1, 2011, Kira, along with the towns of Hazu and Isshiki (all from Hazu District), was merged into the expanded city of Nishio. Hazu District was dissolved as a result of this merger.
