= Hazu District =

Former district in Aichi Prefecture, Japan

Coordinates: 34.823230°N 137.021192°E

Map of Hazu District in Aichi Prefecture from 1955 to 2011

Hazu (幡豆郡, Hazu-gun) was a district located in southeastern Aichi Prefecture, Japan.

As of 2003 (the last data available), the district had an estimated population of 58,921 with a density of 696.88 persons per km^{2}. Its total area was 84.55 km^{2} (32.64 mi^{2}).

== Municipalities ==
Prior to its dissolution, the district consisted of three towns:

- Hazu (Note: Classified as a town.)
- Isshiki
- Kira

== History ==
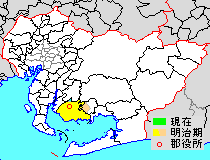
Map showing original extent of Hazu District in Aichi Prefecture: * yellow - areas formerly within the district borders during the early Meiji period

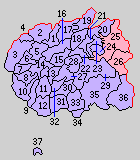
Colored areas are in this district.

Hazu District was one of the ancient districts of Mikawa Province, and was mentioned in Heian period Ritsuryō records under a variety of kanji spellings. Bordering on Mikawa Bay, one of its noted products was sharkskin and dried shark meat, which was sent as taxes to the Imperial household in Kyoto.

=== District Timeline ===
Modern Hazu District was created on 1 October 1889 as part of the cadastral reforms of the early Meiji period. Initially, it consisted of the town of Nishio and 36 villages. On 13 May 1892, the villages Isshiki and Yokosuka were elevated to town status. However, both reverted back to village status in 1906, and in a round of consolidation, the remaining number of villages was reduced to 14. Isshiki regained its town status on 1 October 1923, followed by Yoshida and Hirasaku in 1924, Hazu in 1928, and Terazu in 1929, leaving the district with 6 towns and 6 villages by 1932.

On 15 December 1953, Nishio was elevated to city status, annexing the towns of Hirasaku and Terazu and two villages later that year. On 10 March 1955, Yoshida and the village of Yokosuka were merged to form the town of Kira, leaving the district with three towns and no villages.

=== 2011 merger ===
- On 1 April 2011 - The towns of Hazu, Isshiki and Kira were merged into the expanded city of Nishio. Therefore, Hazu District was dissolved as a result of this merger.

== See also ==
- List of dissolved districts of Japan
