= Yonezu Station =

Railway station in Nishio, Aichi Prefecture, Japan

Yonezu Station 米津駅

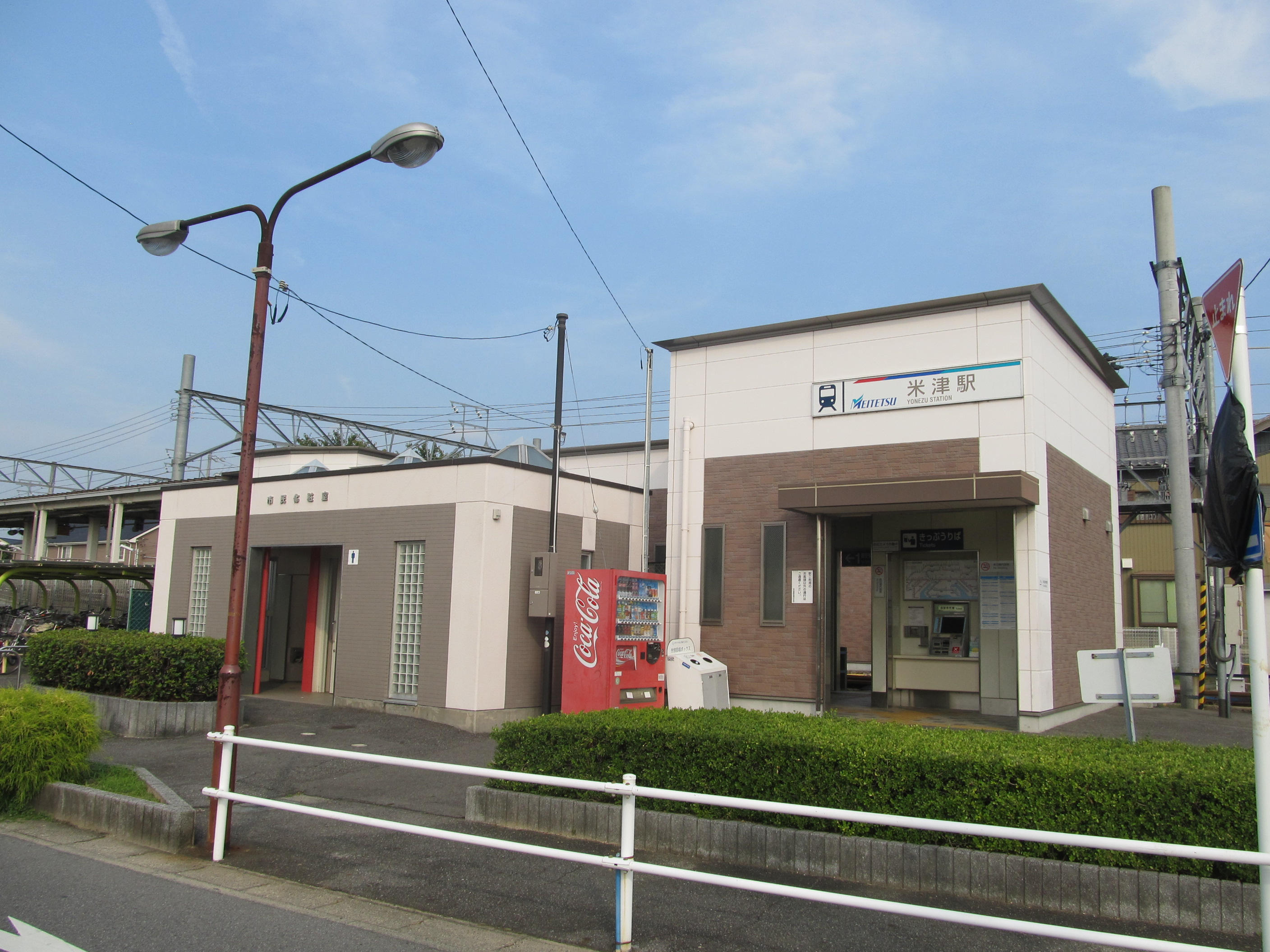
- Yonezu Station in September 2014

General information
- Location: Sakuramichi 60 Yonezucho, Nishio-shi, Aichi-ken 445-0802; Japan
- Coordinates: 34.8929°N 137.0611°E
- Operator: Meitetsu
- Line: ■ Meitetsu Nishio Line
- Distance: 11.6 kilometers from Shin Anjō
- Platforms: 2 side platforms

Other information
- Status: Unstaffed
- Station code: GN07
- Website: Official website

History
- Opened: May 1, 1926

Passengers
- FY2017: 942 daily

Services
Preceding station	Meitetsu	Following station
Minami Sakurai towards Shin Anjō	Nishio Line Express Local	Sakuramachi-mae towards Kira Yoshida
Location
- Location within Aichi Prefecture Location within Japan

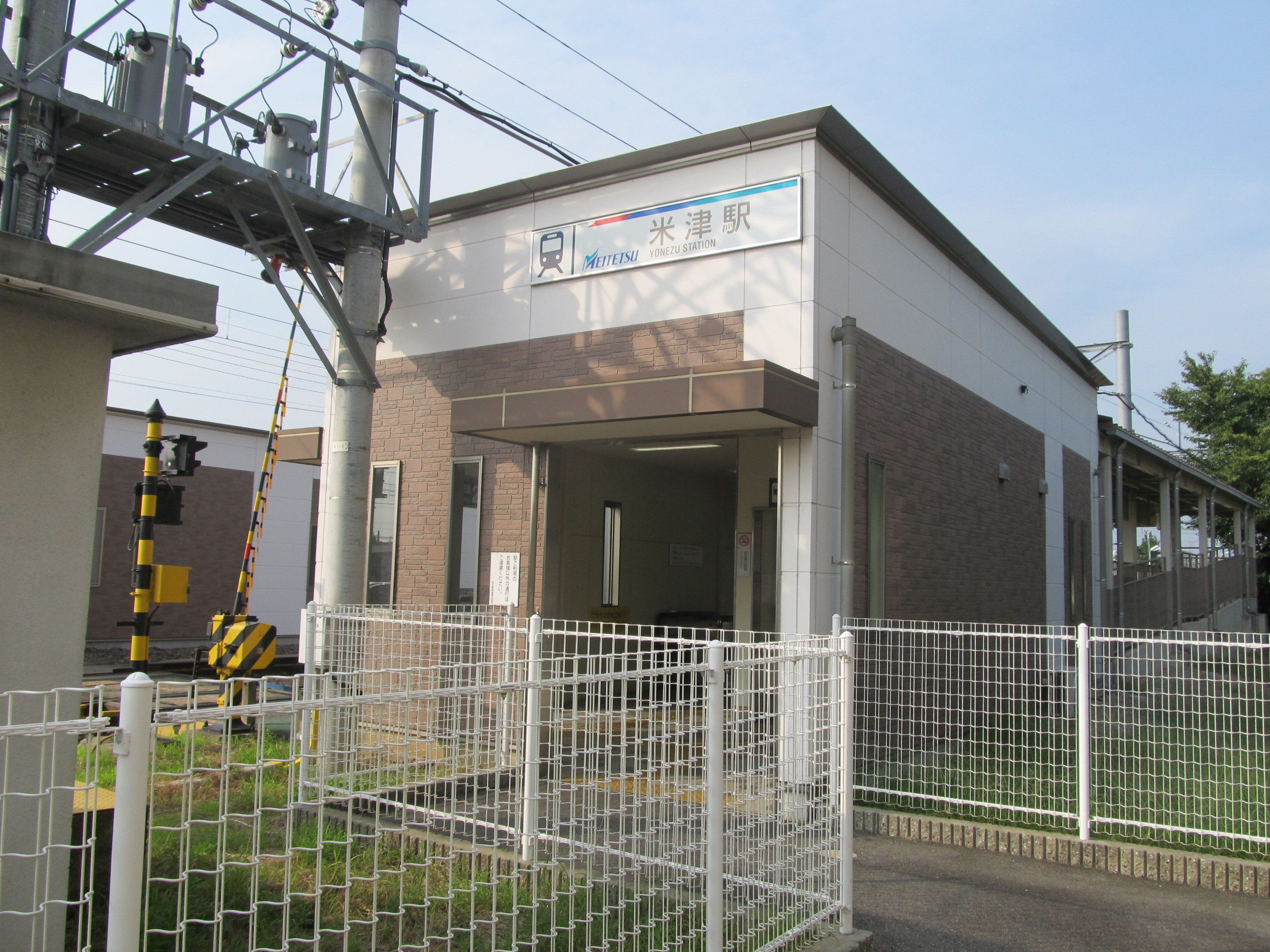
Yonezu Station

Yonezu Station (米津駅, Yonezu-eki) is a railway station in the city of Nishio, Aichi, Japan, operated by Meitetsu.

== Lines ==
Yonezu Station is served by the Meitetsu Nishio Line, and is located 11.6 kilometers from the starting point of the line at Shin Anjō.

== Station layout ==
The station has two opposed side platforms connected by a level crossing. The station has automated ticket machines, Manaca automated turnstiles and is unattended.

=== Platforms ===
1	■ Nishio Line	for Shin Anjō and Meitetsu Nagoya
2	■ Nishio Line	for Nishio and Kira Yoshida

== Station history ==
Yonezu Station was opened on May 1, 1926, as a station on the privately held Hekikai Electric Railway. Hekikai Electric Railway merged with the Meitetsu Group on May 1, 1944. The station has been unattended since February 1985.

== Passenger statistics ==
In fiscal 2017, the station was used by an average of 942 passengers daily (boarding passengers only).

== Surrounding area ==
- Yonezu Elementary School

== See also ==
- List of railway stations in Japan
