= Horiuchikōen Station =

Railway station in Anjō, Aichi Prefecture, Japan

Horiuchikōen Station 堀内公園駅

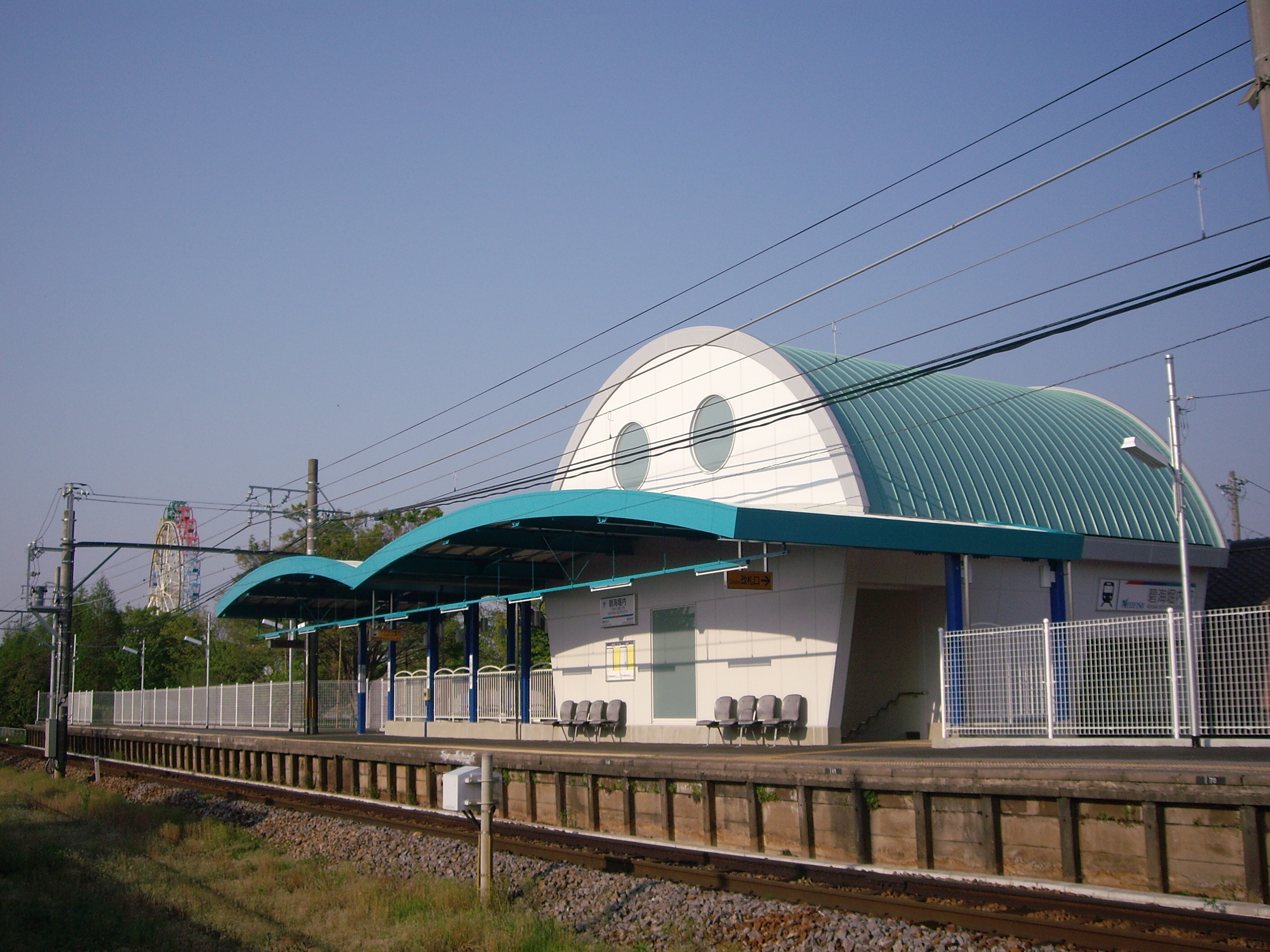
- Horiuchikōen Station in 2008

General information
- Location: Maeyama 92 Horiuchichō Anjō-shi, Aichi-ken 444-1155; Japan
- Coordinates: 34.9278°N 137.0894°E
- Operator: Meitetsu
- Line: ■ Meitetsu Nishio Line
- Distance: 6.7 kilometers from Shin Anjō
- Platforms: 1 side platform

Other information
- Status: Unstaffed
- Station code: GN04
- Website: Official website

History
- Opened: July 1, 1926
- Former names: Hekikai Horiuchi (to 2008)

Passengers
- FY2017: 479 daily

Services
Preceding station	Meitetsu	Following station
Hekikai Furui towards Shin Anjō	Nishio Line Local	Sakurai towards Kira Yoshida
Location
- Location within Aichi Prefecture Location within Japan

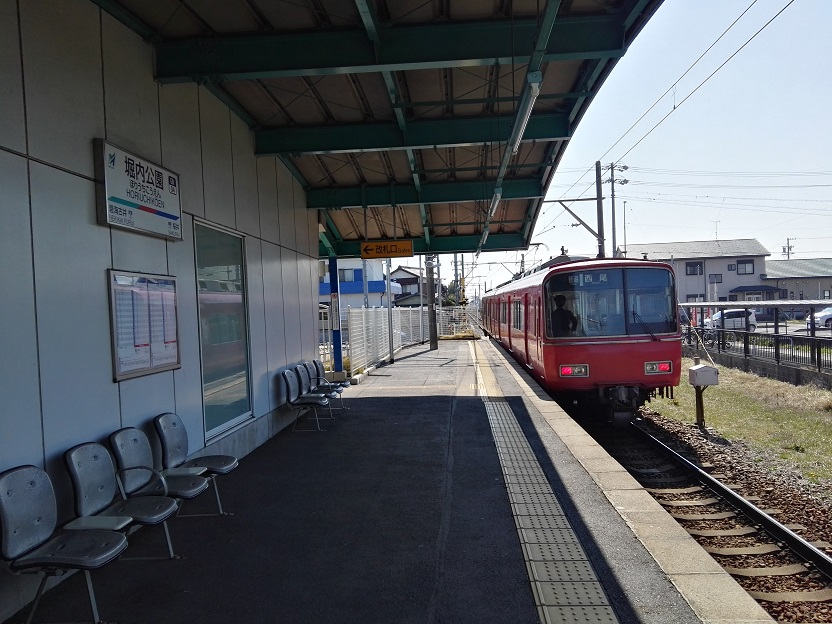
Platforms

Horiuchikōen Station (堀内公園駅, Horiuchikōen-eki) is a railway station in the city of Anjō, Aichi, Japan, operated by Meitetsu.

== Lines ==
Horiuchikōen Station is served by the Meitetsu Nishio Line, and is located 6.7 kilometers from the starting point of the line at Shin Anjō.

== Station layout ==
The station has a single side platform serving bi-directional traffic, connected to a small station building with rounded walls.

== Station history ==
Horiuchikōen Station was opened on July 1, 1926 as Hekikai Horiuchi Station (碧海堀内駅) on the privately held Hekikai Electric Railway. Hekikai Electric Railway merged with the Meitetsu Group on May 1, 1944. The station was reconstructed in 2007, and was renamed to its present name on June 29, 2008.

== Passenger statistics ==
In fiscal 2017, the station was used by an average of 479 passengers daily (boarding passengers only).

== Surrounding area ==
- Futago Kofun

== See also ==
- List of railway stations in Japan
