= Sakuramachi-mae Station =

Railway station in Nishio, Aichi Prefecture, Japan

Sakuramachi-mae Station 桜町前駅

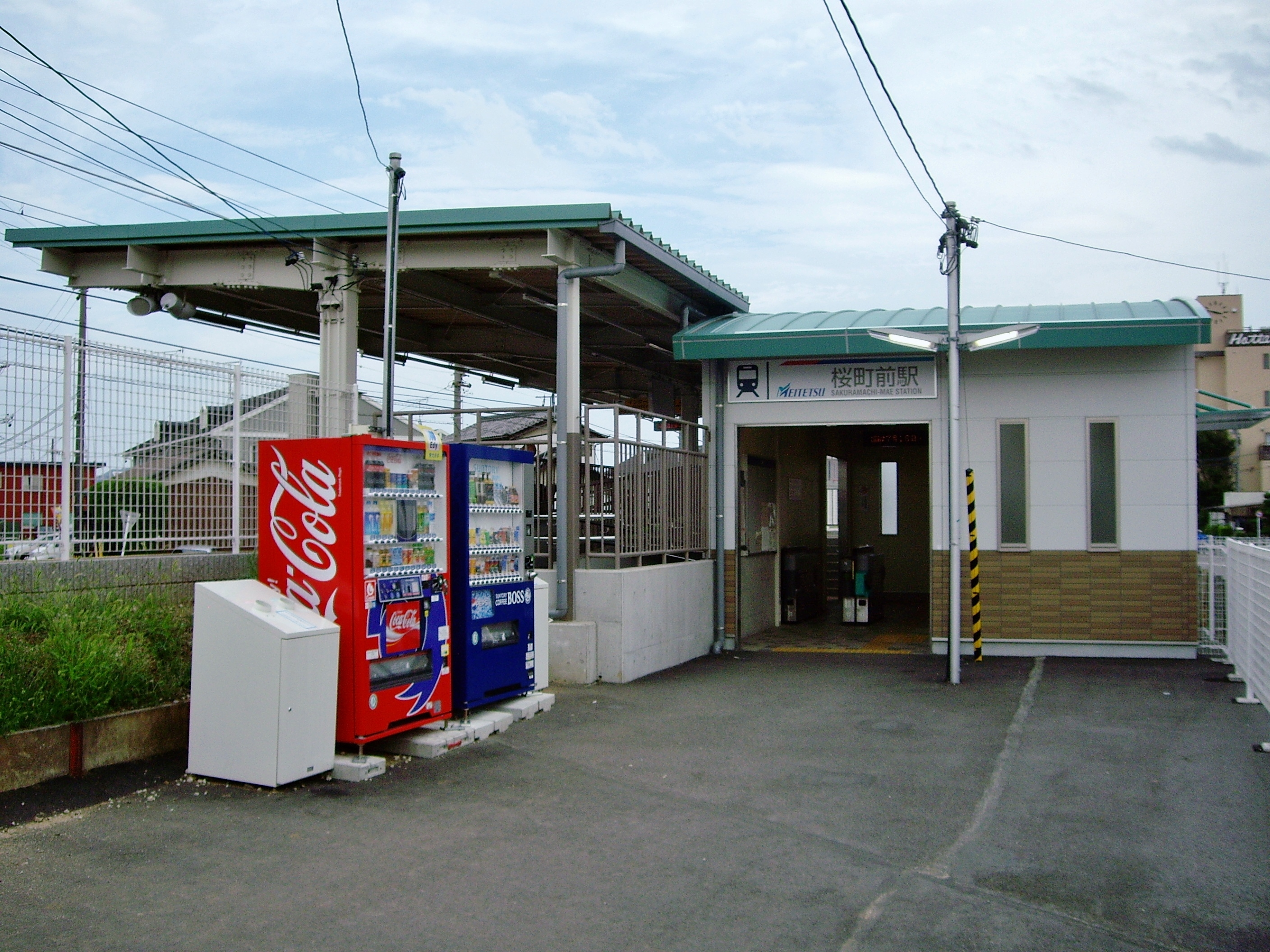
- Sakuramachi-mae Station in July 2009

General information
- Location: 4-28 Midorimachi, Nishio-shi, Aichi-ken 445-0804; Japan
- Coordinates: 34°52′49″N 137°03′45″E
- Operator: Meitetsu
- Line: ■ Meitetsu Nishio Line
- Distance: 13.0 kilometers from Shin Anjō
- Platforms: 1 side platform

Other information
- Status: Unstaffed
- Station code: GN08
- Website: Official website

History
- Opened: October 5, 1928
- Former names: Chūgaku-mae (to 1949)

Passengers
- FY2017: 1641 daily

Services
Preceding station	Meitetsu	Following station
Yonezu towards Shin Anjō	Nishio Line Express	Nishio towards Kira Yoshida
Yonezu towards Shin Anjō	Nishio Line Local	Nishioguchi towards Kira Yoshida
Location
- Location within Aichi Prefecture Location within Japan

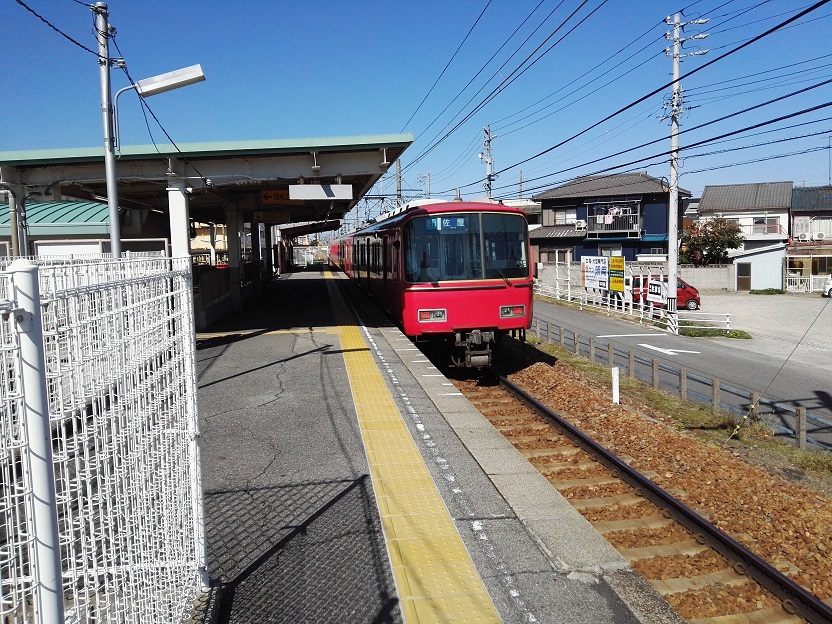
Platform

Sakuramachi-mae Station (桜町前駅, Sakuramachi-mae-eki) is a railway station in the city of Nishio, Aichi, Japan, operated by Meitetsu.

== Lines ==
Sakuramachi Station is served by the Meitetsu Nishio Line, and is located 13.0 kilometers from the starting point of the line at Shin Anjō.

== Station layout ==
The station has one side platform serving a single bi-directional track. The station has automated ticket machines, Manaca automated turnstiles and is unattended.

== Station history ==
Sakuramachi-mae Station was opened on October 5, 1928 as Chūgaku-mae Station (中学前駅, Chūgaku-mae-eki) on the privately held Hekikai Electric Railway. Hekikai Electric Railway merged with the Meitetsu Group on May 1, 1944. It was renamed to its present name on December 1, 1949. The station has been unattended since February 1967.

== Passenger statistics ==
In fiscal 2017, the station was used by an average of 1641 passengers daily (boarding passengers only).

== Surrounding area ==
- Nishio High School

== See also ==
- List of railway stations in Japan
