= Fukuchi Station =

Railway station in Nishio, Aichi Prefecture, Japan

Fukuchi Station 福地駅

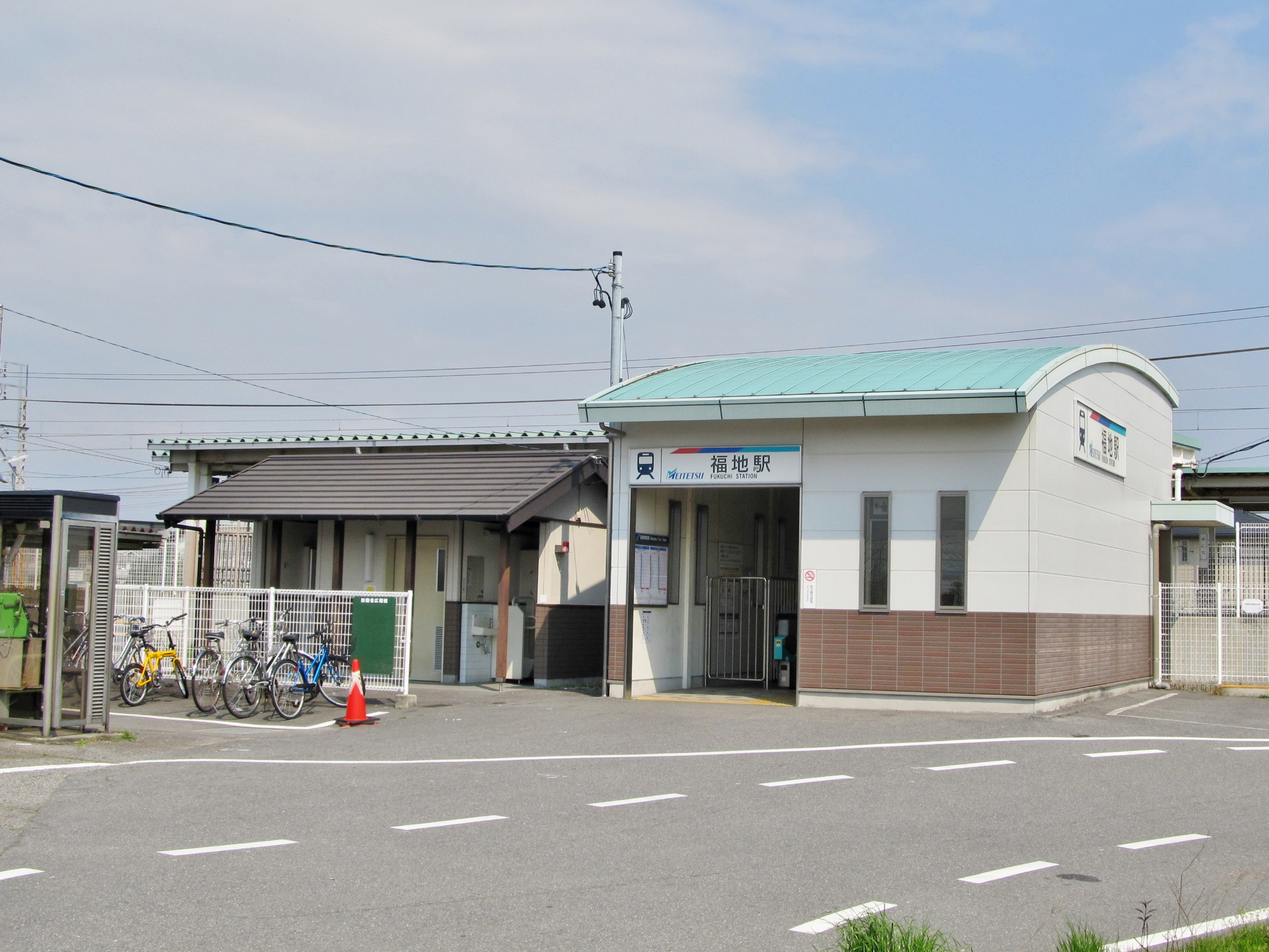
- Fukuchi Station in April 2020

General information
- Location: Kawaguchi-cho Matsubara 28, Nishio-shi, Aichi-ken 445-0873; Japan
- Coordinates: 34.8446°N 137.0486°E
- Operator: Meitetsu
- Line: ■ Meitetsu Nishio Line
- Distance: 17.4 kilometers from Shin Anjō
- Platforms: 2 side platforms

Other information
- Status: Unstaffed
- Station code: GN11
- Website: Official website

History
- Opened: February 13, 1915
- Former names: Isshikiguchi (until 1949)

Passengers
- FY2017: 657 daily

Services
Preceding station	Meitetsu	Following station
Nishio towards Shin Anjō	Nishio Line Express Local	Kami Yokosuka towards Kira Yoshida
Location
- Location within Aichi Prefecture Location within Japan

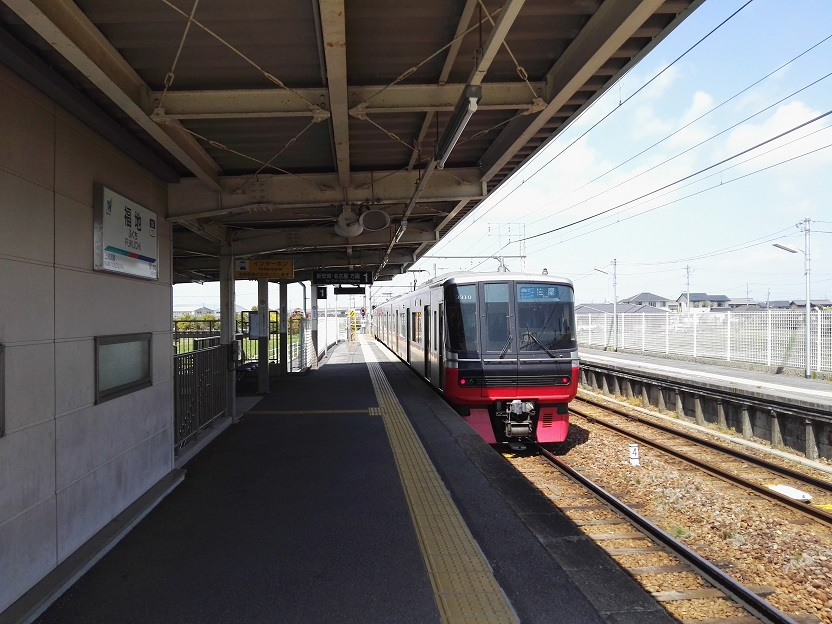
Platform

Fukuchi Station (福地駅, Fukuchi-eki) is a railway station in the city of Nishio, Aichi, Japan, operated by Meitetsu.

== Lines ==
Fukuchi Station is served by the Meitetsu Nishio Line, and is located 17.4 kilometers from the starting point of the line at Shin Anjō.

== Station layout ==
The station has two opposed side platforms with Platform 1 on a passing loop, and connected by a level crossing. The station has automated ticket machines, Manaca automated turnstiles and is unattended.

=== Platforms ===
1	■ Nishio Line	for Nishio, Shin Anjō and Meitetsu Nagoya
2	■ Nishio Line	for Kira Yoshida

== Station history ==
Fukuchi Station was opened on February 13, 1915, as Ishikiguchi Station (一色口駅, Ishikiguchi-eki) on the privately held Nishio Railway. On December 21, 1926, the Nishio Railway merged with the Aichi Electric Railway, which was acquired by the Meitetsu Group on August 1, 1935. It was renamed to its present name on March 1, 1949. The station has been unattended since February 1967.

== Passenger statistics ==
In fiscal 2017, the station was used by an average of 657 passengers daily (boarding passengers only).

== Surrounding area ==
- JA Mikawa Fukuchi branch office

== See also ==
- List of railway stations in Japan
