= Nishioguchi Station =

Railway station in Nishio, Aichi Prefecture, Japan

Nishioguchi Station 西尾口駅

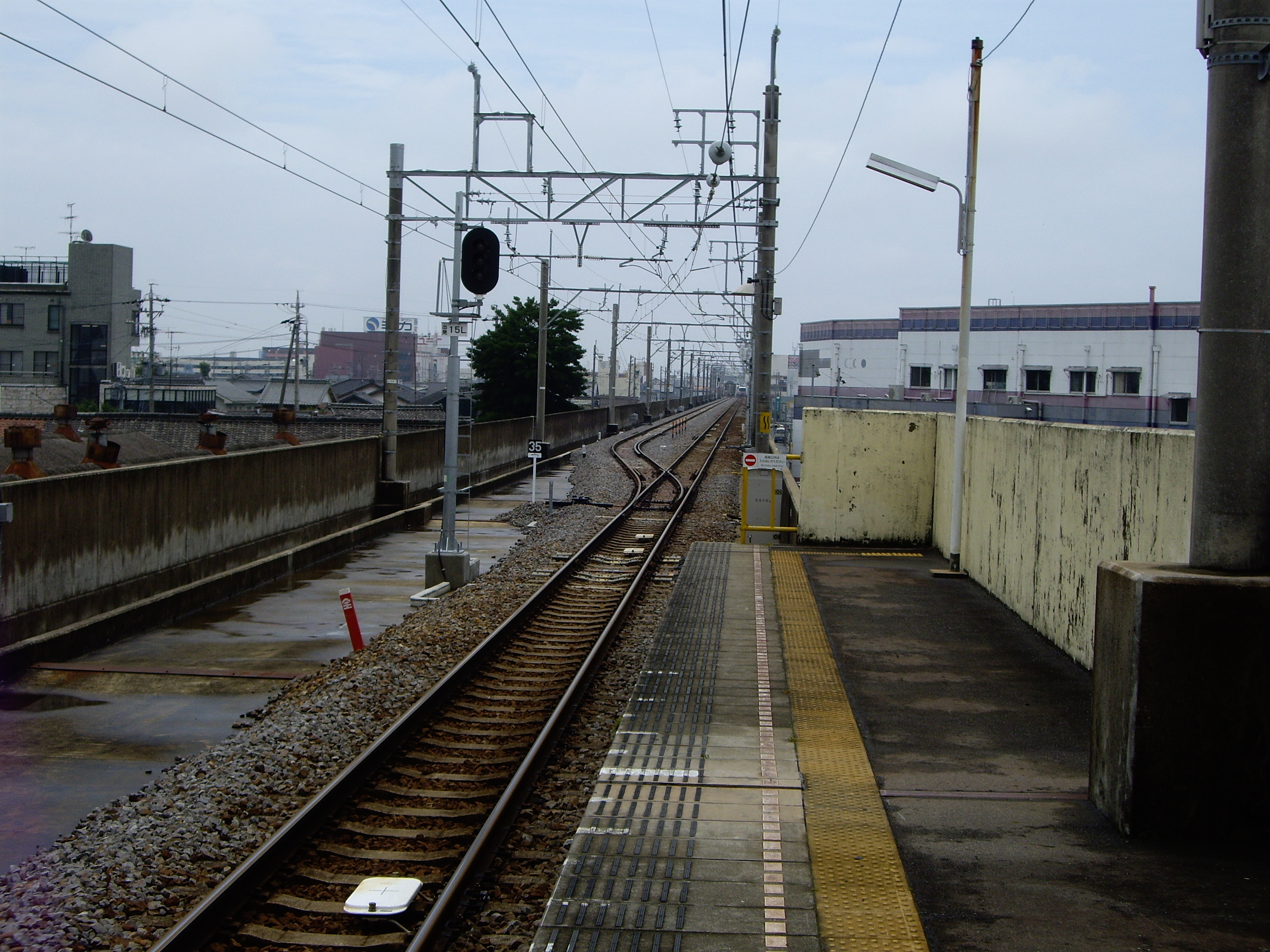
- Nishioguchi Station in February 2019

General information
- Location: Shibakusa Yorizumicho, Nishio-shi, Aichi-ken 445-0073; Japan
- Coordinates: 34.8705°N 137.0627°E
- Operator: Meitetsu
- Line: ■ Meitetsu Nishio Line
- Distance: 14.2 kilometers from Shin Anjō
- Platforms: 1 side platform

Other information
- Status: Unstaffed
- Station code: GN09
- Website: Official website

History
- Opened: October 5, 1928
- Former names: Hekiden Nishioguchi (until 1944)

Passengers
- FY2017: 278 daily

Services
Preceding station	Meitetsu	Following station
Sakuramachi-mae towards Shin Anjō	Nishio Line Local	Nishio towards Kira Yoshida
Location
- Location within Aichi Prefecture Location within Japan

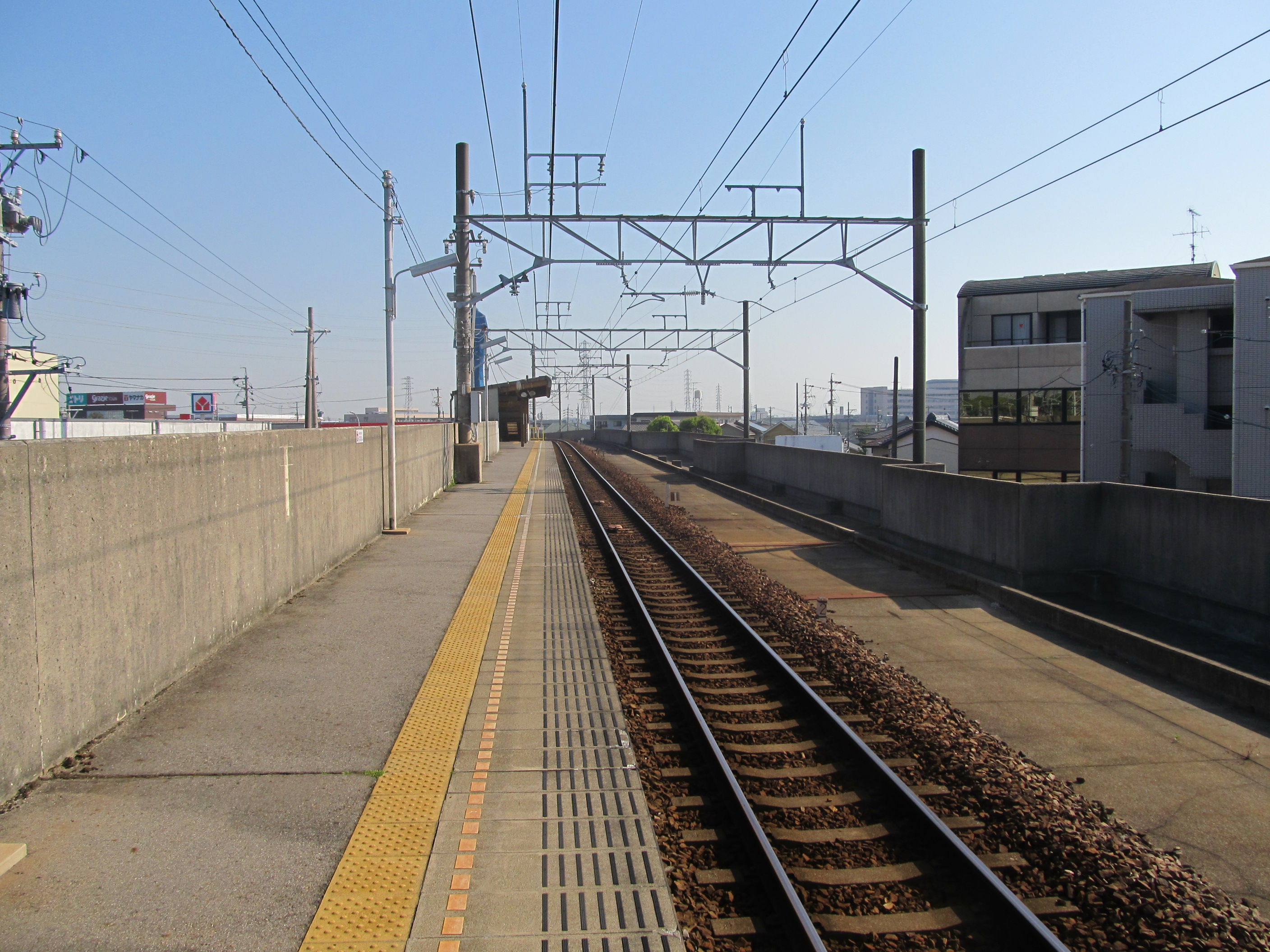
Platform

Nishioguchi Station (西尾口駅, Nishioguchi-eki) is a railway station in the city of Nishio, Aichi, Japan, operated by Meitetsu.

== Lines ==
Nishioguchi Station is served by the Meitetsu Nishio Line, and is located 14.2 kilometers from the starting point of the line at Shin Anjō.

== Station layout ==
The station has one elevated side platform serving a single bi-directional track and the station building underneath. The station has automated ticket machines, Manaca automated turnstiles and is unattended.

== Station history ==
Nishioguchi Station was opened on October 5, 1928, as a Hekiden Nishioguchi Station (碧電西尾口駅) on the privately held Hekikai Electric Railway. It was renamed to its present name on May 1, 1944, when the Hekikai Railway merged with the Meitetsu Group. The tracks were elevated in July 1989.

== Passenger statistics ==
In fiscal 2017, the station was used by an average of 278 passengers daily (boarding passengers only).

== Surrounding area ==
- Nishio Municipal Hospital

== See also ==
- List of railway stations in Japan
