= Kami Yokosuka Station =

Railway station in Nishio, Aichi Prefecture, Japan

Kami Yokosuka Station 上横須賀駅

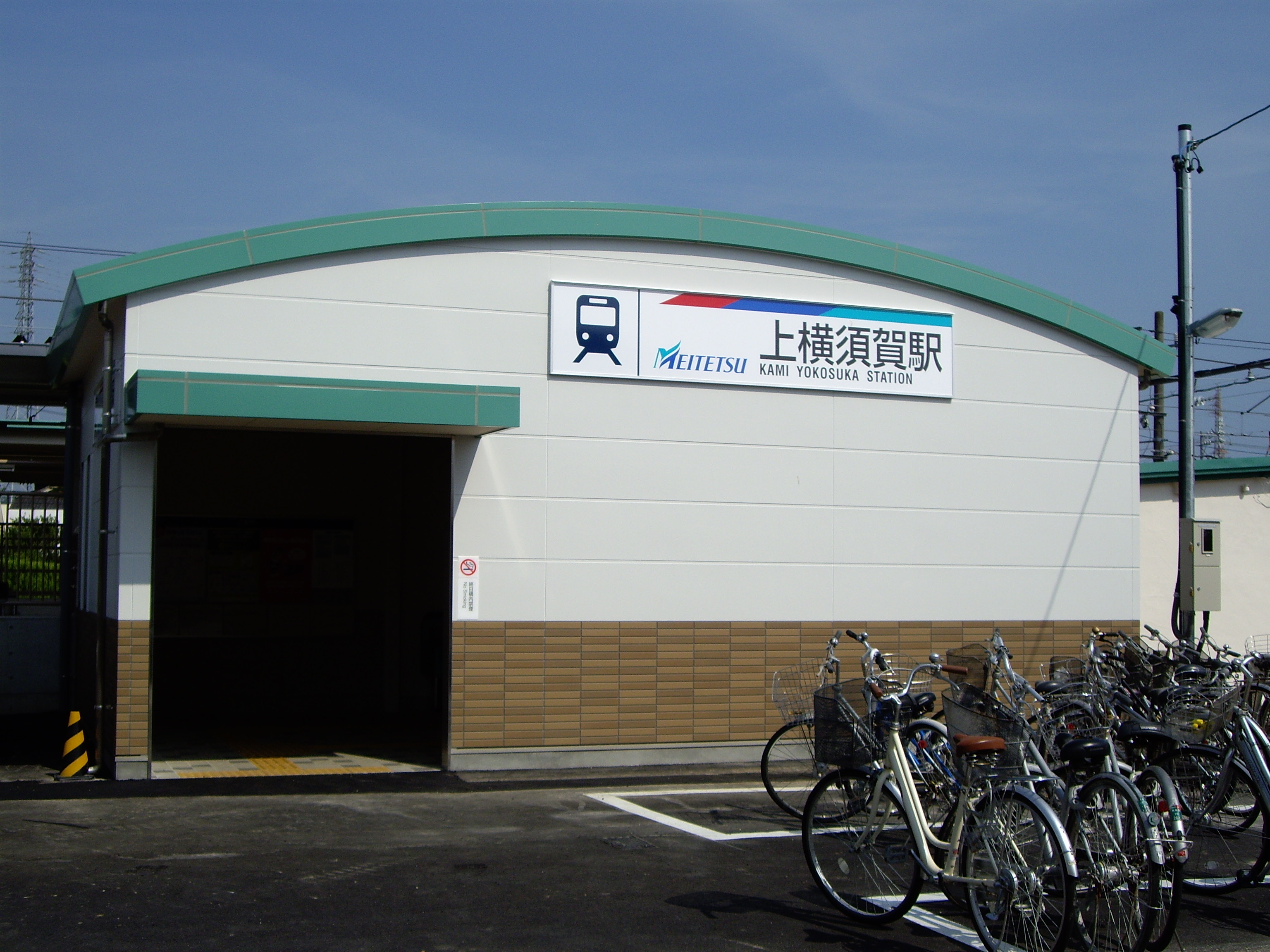
- Kami Yokosuka Station in July 2008

General information
- Location: 60-2 Miyamae Kiracho, Kamiyokosuka, Nishio-shi, Aichi-ken 444-052; Japan
- Coordinates: 34.8297°N 137.0721°E
- Operator: Meitetsu
- Line: ■ Meitetsu Nishio Line
- Distance: 10.5 kilometers from Shin Anjō
- Platforms: 2 side platforms

Other information
- Status: Unstaffed
- Station code: GN12
- Website: Official website

History
- Opened: August 5, 1915

Passengers
- FY2017: 628 daily

Services
Preceding station	Meitetsu	Following station
Fukuchi towards Shin Anjō	Nishio Line Express Local	Kira Yoshida Terminus
Location
- Location within Aichi Prefecture Location within Japan

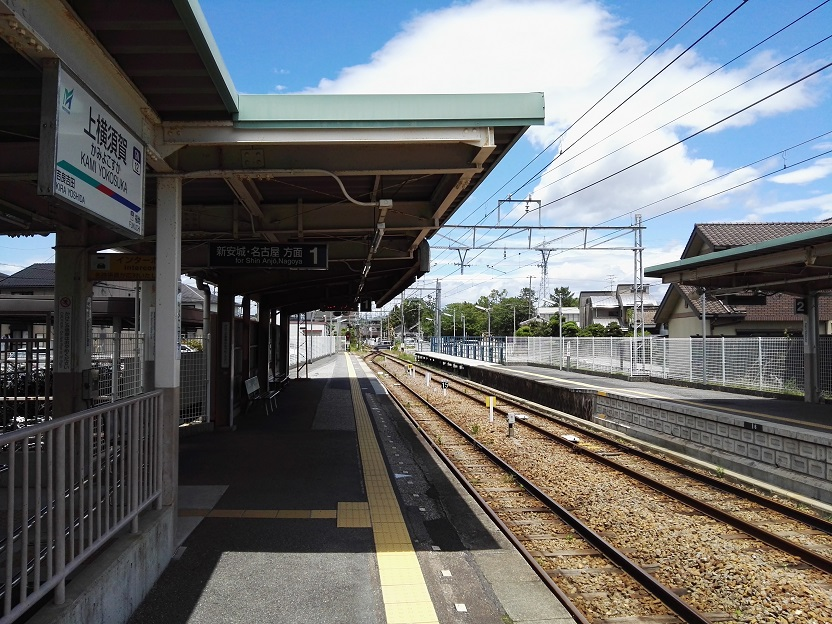
Yonezu Station

Kami Yokosuka Station (上横須賀駅, Kami-Yokosuka-eki) is a railway station in the city of Nishio, Aichi, Japan, operated by Meitetsu.

== Lines ==
Kami Yokosuka Station is served by the Meitetsu Nishio Line, and is located 20.5 kilometers from the starting point of the line at Shin Anjō.

== Station layout ==
The station has two opposed side platforms connected by a level crossing with Platform 1 on a passing loop. The station has automated ticket machines, Manaca automated turnstiles and is unattended.

=== Platforms ===
1	■ Nishio Line	for Nishio, Shin Anjō and Meitetsu Nagoya
2	■ Nishio Line	for Kira Yoshida

== Station history ==
Kami Yokosuka Station was opened on August 5, 1915, as a station on the privately held Nishio Railway. On December 21, 1926, the Nishio Railway merged with the Aichi Electric Railway, which was acquired by the Meitetsu Group on August 1, 1935. The station has been unattended since September 1988.

== Passenger statistics ==
In fiscal 2017, the station was used by an average of 628 passengers daily (boarding passengers only).

== Surrounding area ==
- Yokosuka Elementary School

== See also ==
- List of railway stations in Japan
