= Hekikai Furui Station =

Railway station in Anjō, Aichi Prefecture, Japan

Hekikai Furui Station 碧海古井駅

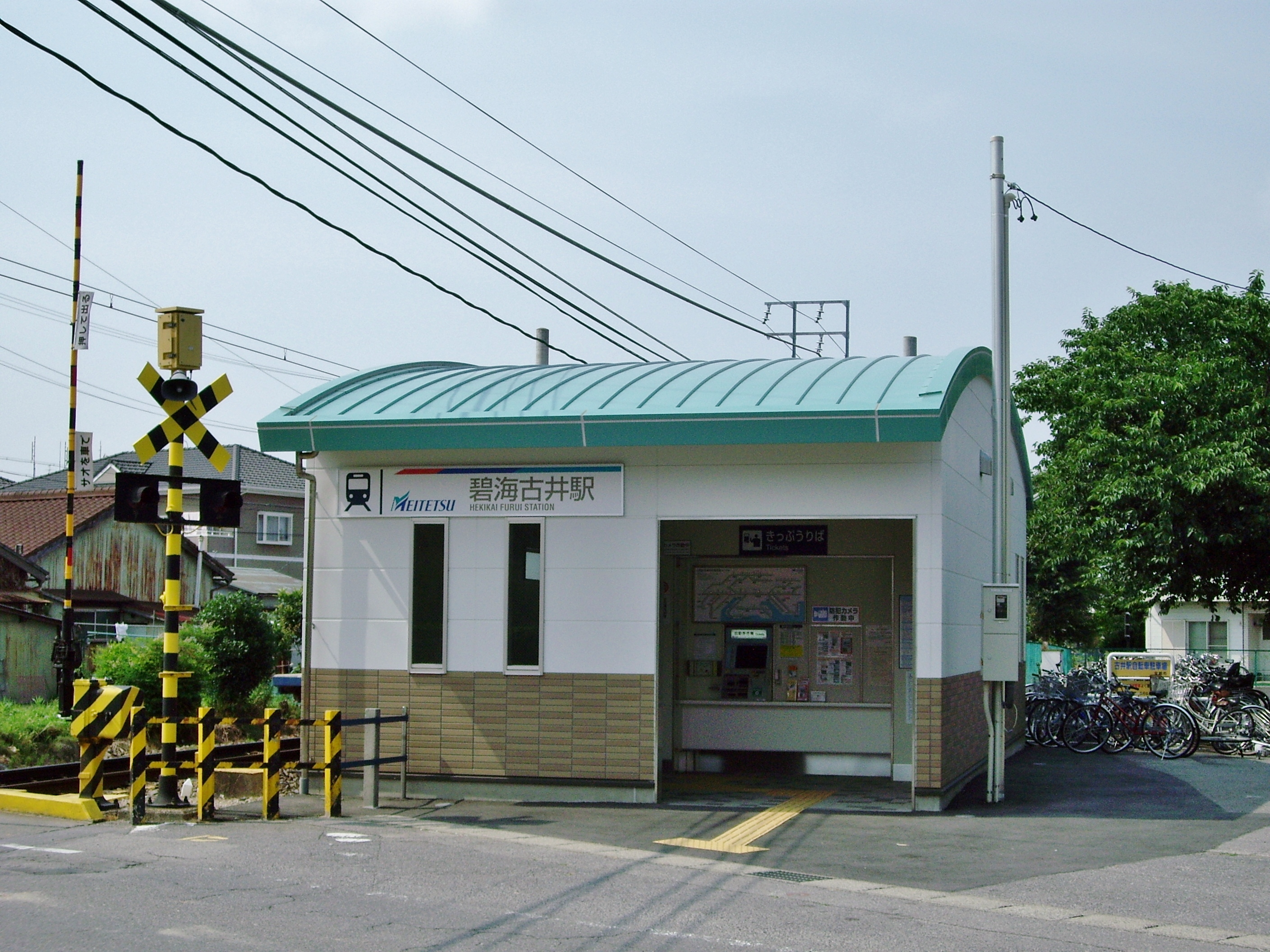
- Hekikai Furui Station in 2008

General information
- Location: Ōkugo-4 Furuichō. Anjō-shi, Aichi-ken 446-0025; Japan
- Coordinates: 34.9374°N 137.0907°E
- Operator: Meitetsu
- Line: ■ Meitetsu Nishio Line
- Distance: 5.7 kilometers from Shin Anjō
- Platforms: 1 side platform

Other information
- Status: Unstaffed
- Station code: GN03
- Website: Official website

History
- Opened: July 1, 1926

Passengers
- FY2017: 1189 daily

Services
Preceding station	Meitetsu	Following station
Minami Anjō towards Shin Anjō	Nishio Line Express (some trains)	Sakurai towards Kira Yoshida
Minami Anjō towards Shin Anjō	Nishio Line Local	Horiuchikōen towards Kira Yoshida
Location
- Location within Aichi Prefecture Location within Japan

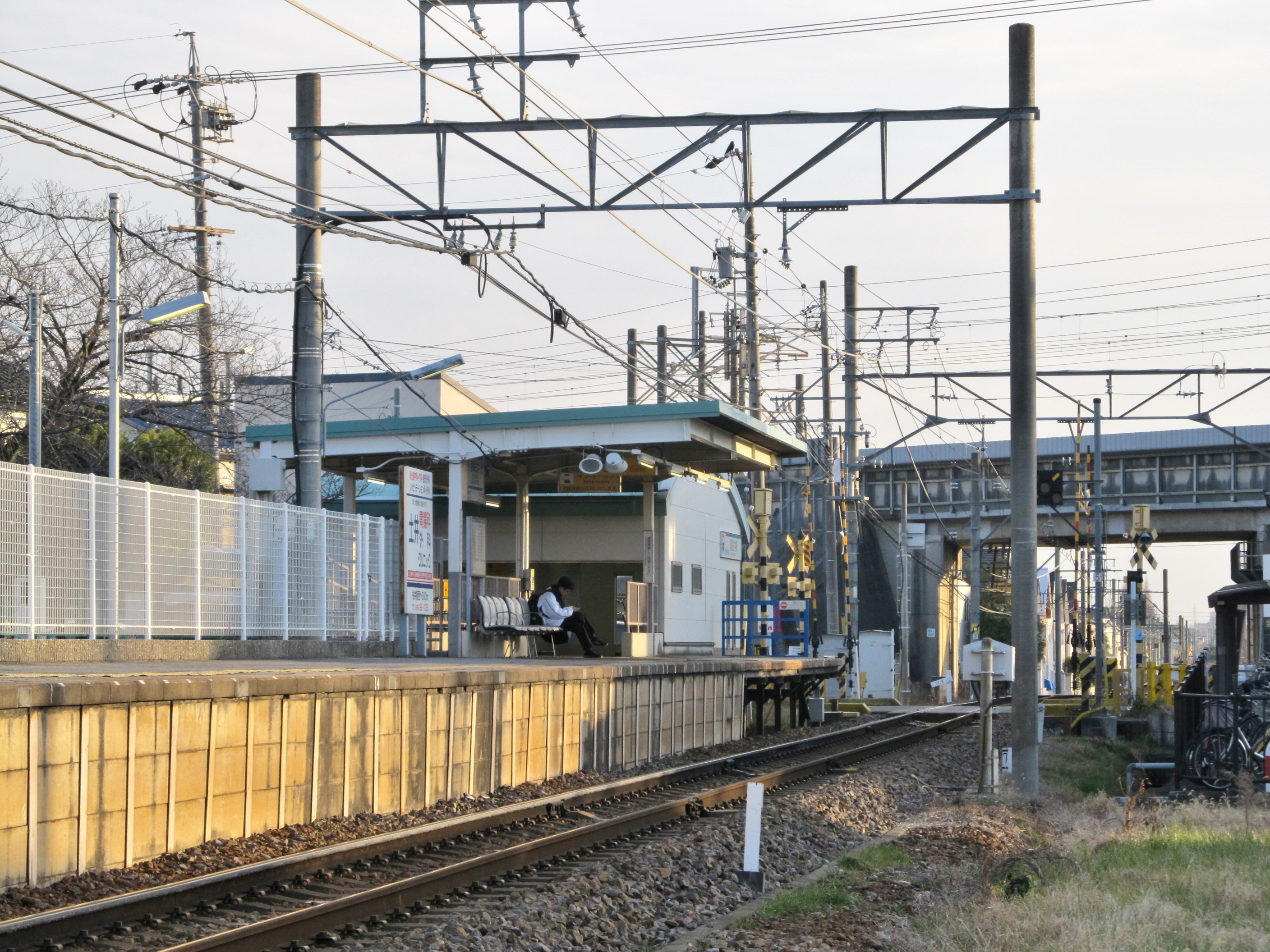
Platforms

Hekikai Furui Station (碧海古井駅, Hekikai-Furui-eki) is a railway station in the city of Anjō, Aichi, Japan, operated by Meitetsu.

== Lines ==
Hekikai Furui Station is served by the Meitetsu Nishio Line, and is located 5.7 kilometers from the starting point of the line at Shin Anjō.

== Station layout ==
The station has a single side platform for bi-directional traffic. The station is unattended.

== Station history ==
Hekikai Furui Station was opened on July 1, 1926, as a station on the privately Hekikai Electric Railway. Hekikai Electric Railway merged with the Meitetsu Group on May 1, 1944. The station was closed in 1944, but was reopened on October 1, 1952.

== Passenger statistics ==
In fiscal 2017, the station was used by an average of 1,189 passengers daily (boarding passengers only).

== Surrounding area ==
- Furui Jinja

== See also ==
- List of railway stations in Japan
