= Minami Anjō Station =

Railway station in Anjō, Aichi Prefecture, Japan

Minami Anjō Station 南安城駅

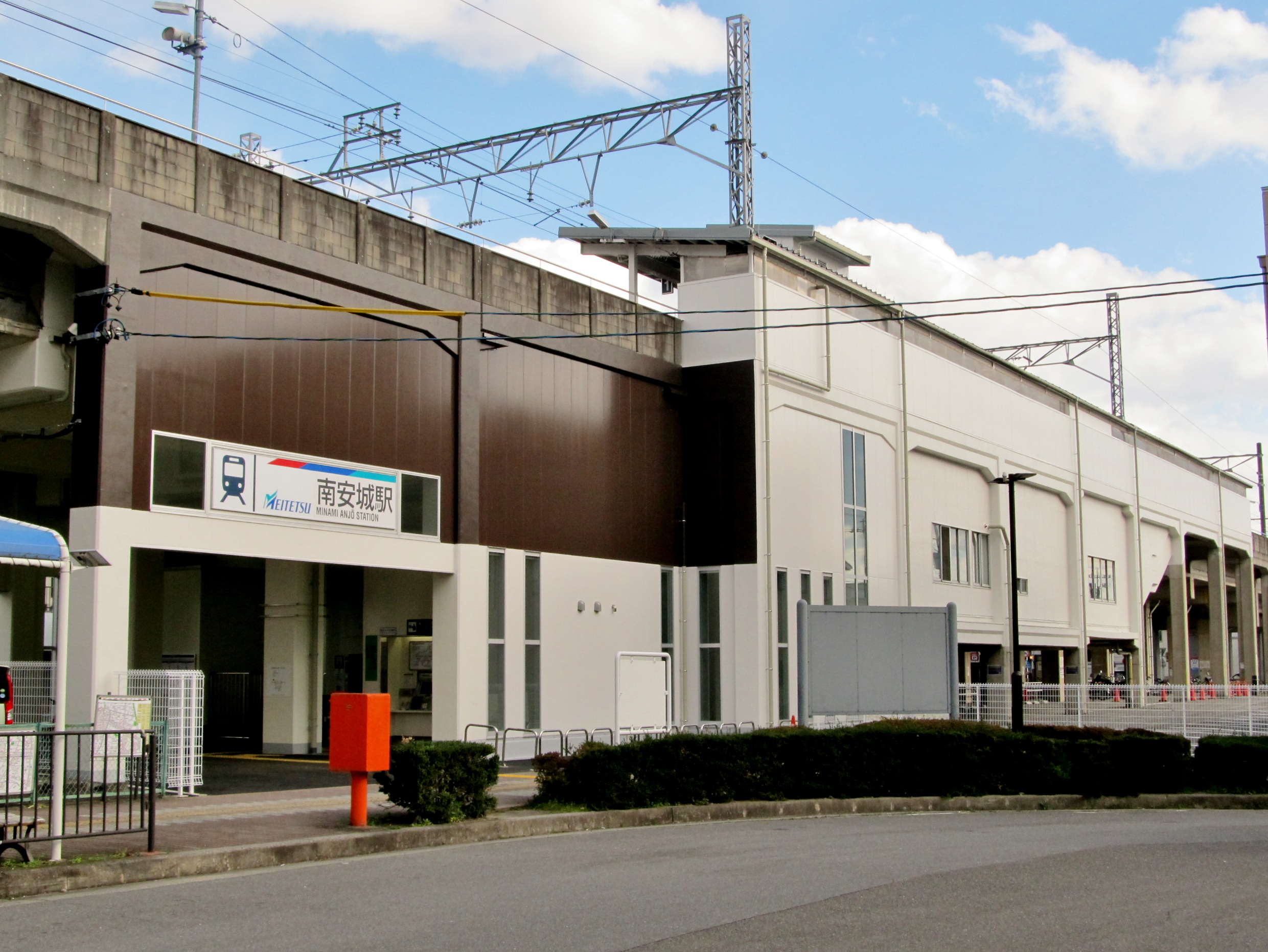
- Minami Anjō Station in March 2019

General information
- Location: Matoba 41-3 Anjō-chō, Anjō-shi, Aichi-kan 446-0026; Japan
- Coordinates: 34°57′07″N 137°05′33″E
- Operator: Meitetsu
- Line: ■ Meitetsu Nishio Line
- Distance: 4.0 kilometers from Shin Anjō
- Platforms: 2 side platforms

Other information
- Status: Staffed
- Station code: GN02
- Website: Official website

History
- Opened: July 1, 1926

Passengers
- FY2017: 5026 daily

Services
Preceding station	Meitetsu	Following station
Shin Anjō Terminus	Nishio Line Limited Express Express	Sakurai towards Kira Yoshida
Kita Anjō towards Shin Anjō	Nishio Line Local (plus some Express trains)	Hekikai Furui towards Kira Yoshida
Location
- Location within Aichi Prefecture Location within Japan

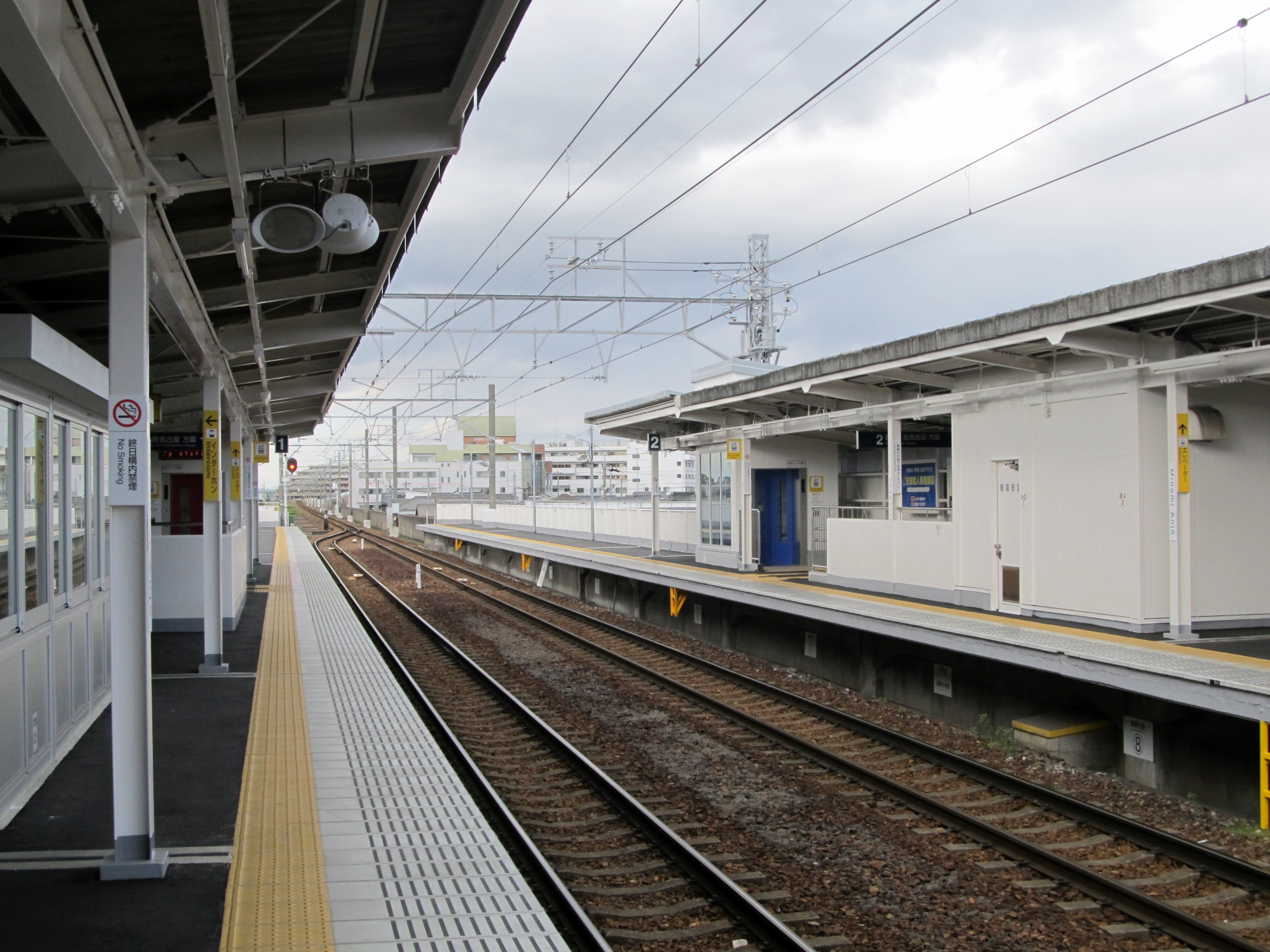
Platforms

Minami Anjō Station (南安城駅, Minami-Anjō-eki) is a railway station in the city of Anjō, Aichi, Japan, operated by Meitetsu.

== Lines ==
Minami Anjō Station is served by the Meitetsu Nishio Line, and is located 4.0 kilometers from the starting point of the line at Shin Anjō.

== Station layout ==
The station is an elevated station with two opposed side platforms and the station building underneath. The station is staffed.

=== Platforms ===
1	■ Nishio Line	for Shin Anjō
2	■ Nishio Line	for Nishio and Kira Yoshida

== Station history ==
Minami Anjō Station was opened on July 1, 1926 as a station on the privately held Hekikai Electric Railway. Hekikai Electric Railway merged with the Meitetsu Group on May 1, 1944. The station was reconstructed in 1961, and the tracks were elevated in May 1981. The station has been unattended since October 11, 2007.

== Passenger statistics ==
In fiscal 2017, the station was used by an average of 5,026 passengers daily (boarding passengers only).

== Surrounding area ==
- Anjō Gakuen High School
- Anjō City History Museum

== See also ==
- List of railway stations in Japan
