= Minami Sakurai Station (Aichi) =

Railway station in Anjō, Aichi Prefecture, Japan

Minami Sakurai Station 南桜井駅

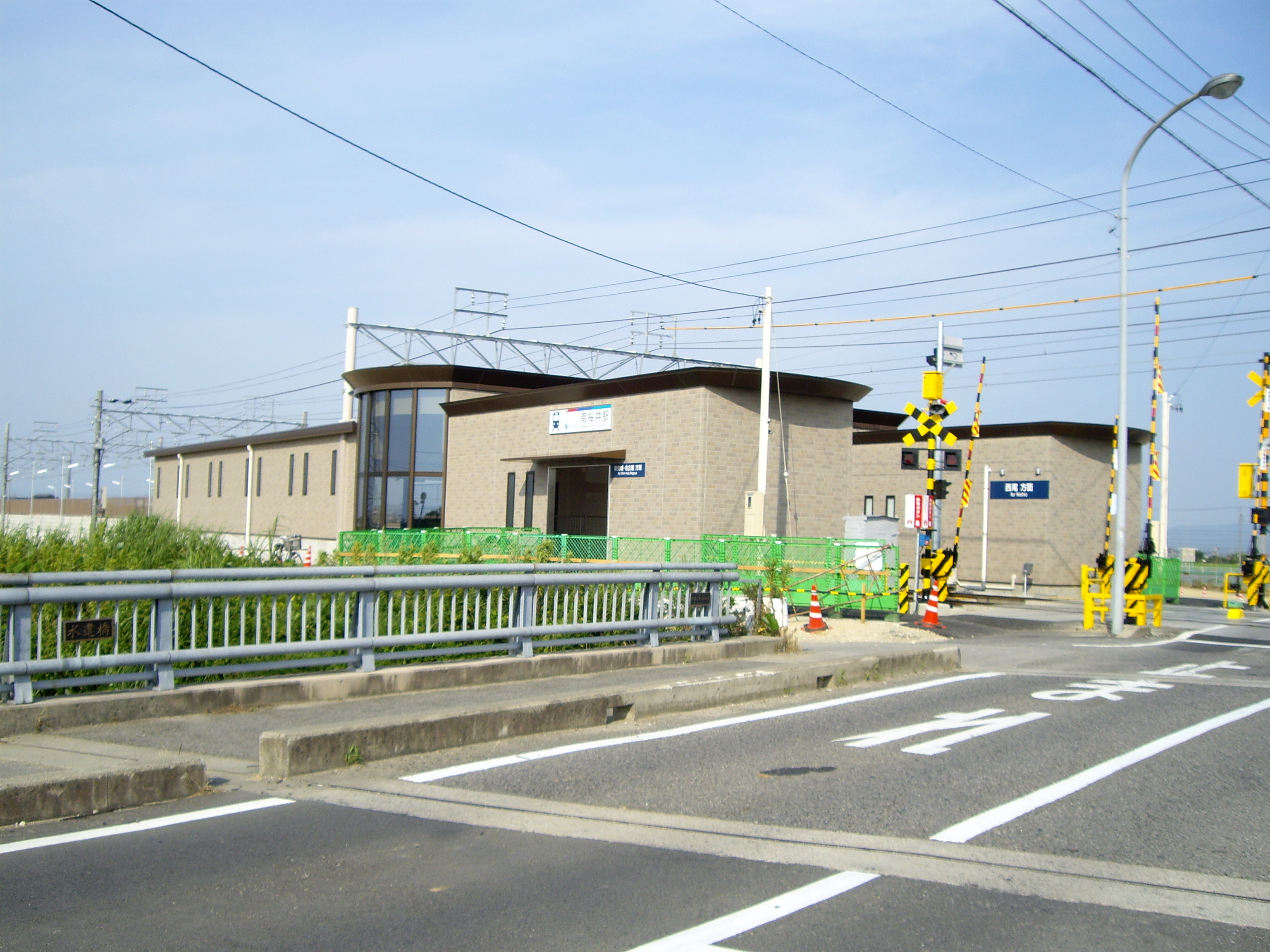
- Minami Sakurai Station in July 2008

General information
- Location: Mizuyari-23 Ogawachō Anjō-shi, Aichi-ken 444-1162; Japan
- Coordinates: 34.9062°N 137.077°E
- Operator: Meitetsu
- Line: ■ Meitetsu Nishio Line
- Distance: 9.5 kilometers from Shin Anjō
- Platforms: 2 side platforms

Other information
- Status: Unstaffed
- Station code: GN06
- Website: Official website

History
- Opened: June 29, 2008

Passengers
- FY2017: 5635 daily

Services
Preceding station	Meitetsu	Following station
Sakurai towards Shin Anjō	Nishio Line Express Local	Yonezu towards Kira Yoshida
Location
- Location within Aichi Prefecture Location within Japan

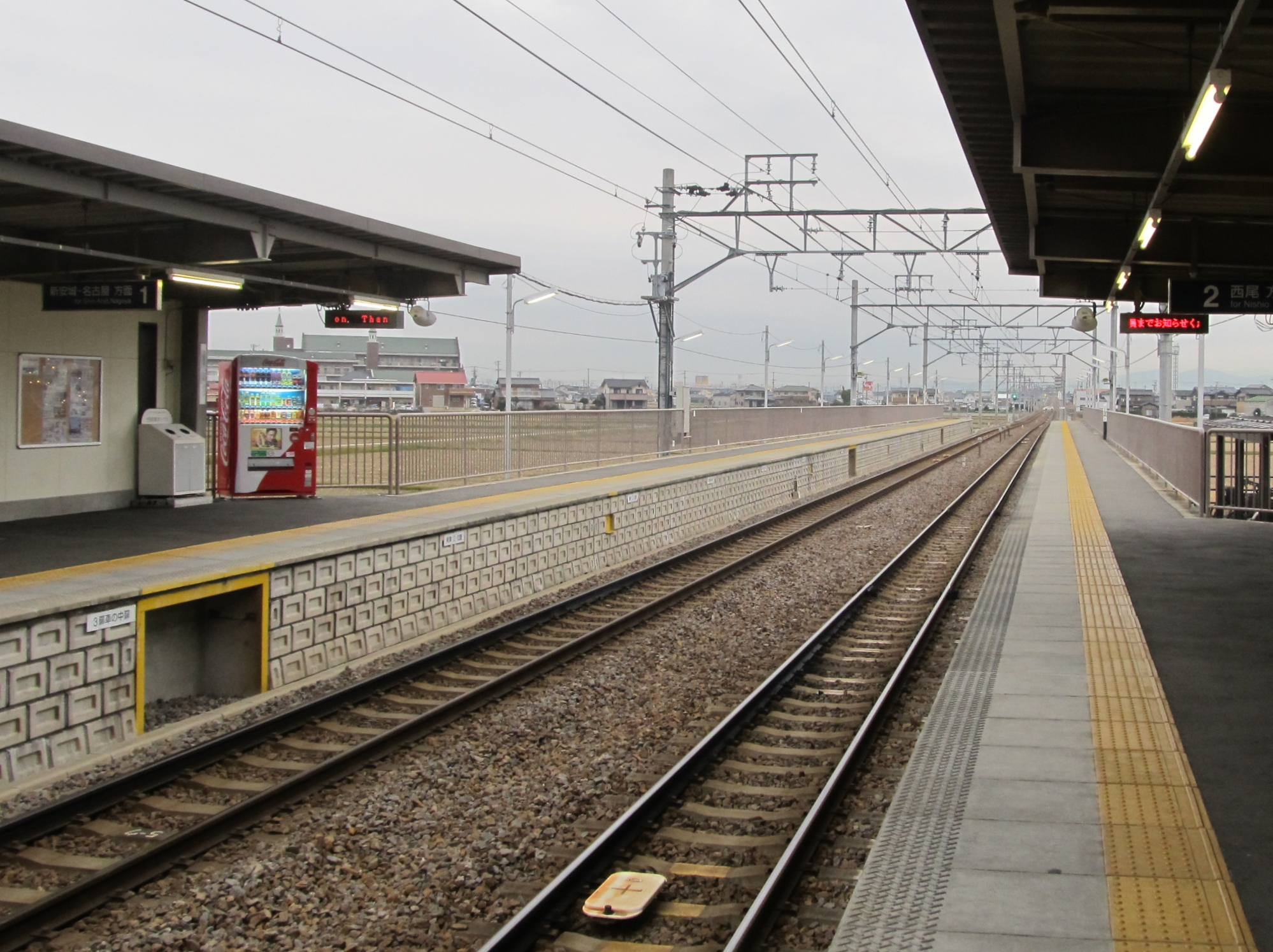
Platforms

Minami Sakurai Station (南桜井駅, Minami Sakurai-eki) is a railway station in the city of Anjō, Aichi, Japan, operated by Meitetsu.

== Lines ==
Minami Sakurai Station is served by the Meitetsu Nishio Line, and is located 9.5 kilometers from the starting point of the line at Shin Anjō.

== Station layout ==
The station has dual opposed side platforms. The platforms are not interconnecting, and any passengers wishing to change platforms must leave the station and re-enter after crossing the tracks via a public road. The station is unattended.

=== Platforms ===
1	■ Nishio Line	for Shin Anjō
2	■ Nishio Line	for Nishio and Kira Yoshida

== Station history ==
Minami Sakurai Station was opened on June 29, 2008.

== Passenger statistics ==
In fiscal 2017, the station was used by an average of 5,635 passengers daily (boarding passengers only).

== Surrounding area ==
The station mainly serves factory workers at the Aisin plant.

== See also ==
- List of railway stations in Japan
