= Himeogawa Kofun =

Ancient burial mound in Anjō, Tōkai, Japan

- 姫小川古墳 (Japanese)
- Himeogawa Kofun Himeogawa Kofun (Japan)
- 34°54′56″N 137°05′44″E
- Type: Kofun
- Periods: Kofun period
- Location: Anjō, Aichi, Japan
- Region: Tōkai region

Site notes
- Public access: Yes (no public facilities)

The Himeogawa Kofun (姫小川古墳) is a Kofun period burial mound located in the Himeogawa neighborhood of the city of Anjō, Aichi in the Tōkai region of Japan. The tumulus was designated as a National Historic Site in 1927.

== Overview ==
The Himeogawa Kofun is located on the eastern edge of the Hekikai Plateau facing the alluvial lowland of the west bank of the Yahagi River at an elevation of 12.5 meters, but protruding only four meters above the surrounding rice paddies. The tumulus is a zenpō-kōen-fun (前方後円墳), which is shaped like a keyhole, having one square end and one circular end, when viewed from above. It has an overall length is 66 meters, with a 44-meter diameter posterior circular portion with a height of seven meters. This circular portion is surmounted with an Asama Jinja Shinto shrine. The anterior rectangular portion has a length of 27 meters and width of 31.5 meters with a height of two meters. The tumulus is in an area with a dense concentration of kofun, known as the Sakurai Kofun cluster, and includes the Futago Kofun.

As a result of an archaeological excavation in 2016, it was found that the anterior portion was closer to trapezoidal rather than rectangular as originally assumed, with changes to the terrain caused by landfill in the Edo period and after World War II. The same survey found traces of moats on the west and north sides, but for unknown reasons the moats did not extend to the south side. The tumulus was originally covered in fukiishi stones, but appeared to be earth-fill with no stone burial chamber. This appears to be a characteristic of the kofun in the Sakurai Kofun group, rather than an indication of age, as some haniwa fragments were also discovered. The tumulus has been dated to the late third century AD.

The tumulus is located about 15 minutes on foot from Sakurai Station on the Meitetsu Nishio Line.

Total length
66.0 meters:
Anterior rectangular portion
27 meters long x 31.5 meters wide x 2.0 meters high
Constriction width
19.0 meters
Posterior circular portion
44.0 meter diameter x 7.5 meters high

== See also ==
- List of Historic Sites of Japan (Aichi)
