= Futago Kofun =

Kofun period burial mound in Anjō, Tōkai, Japan

- 二子古墳 (Japanese)
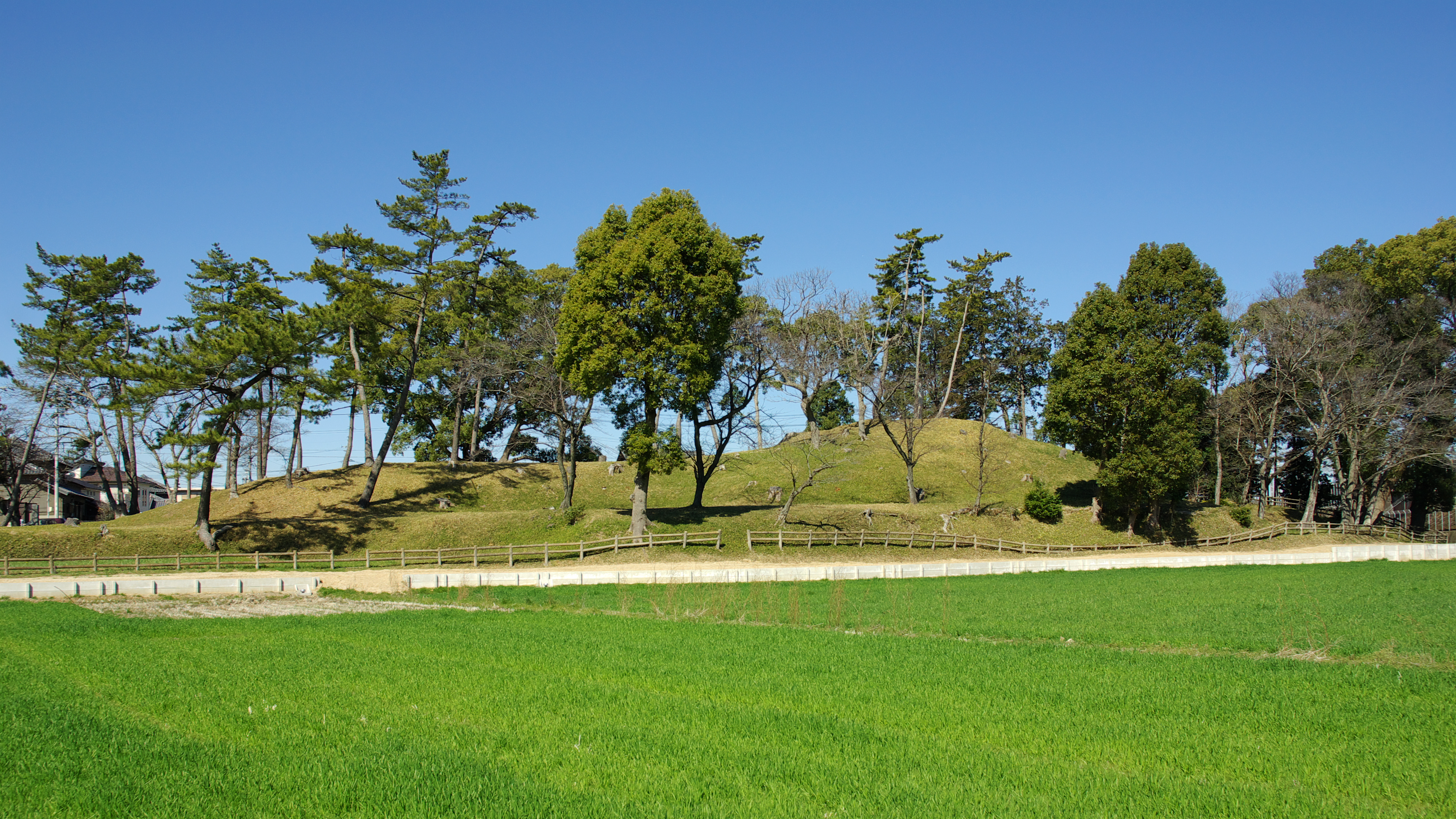
- Futago Kofun

- Futago Kofun Futago Kofun (Japan)
- 34°55′44″N 137°05′47″E
- Type: Kofun
- Periods: Kofun period
- Location: Anjō, Aichi, Japan
- Region: Tōkai region

History
- Built: late 3rd to early 4th century

Site notes
- Public access: Yes (no public facilities)
- National Historic Site of Japan

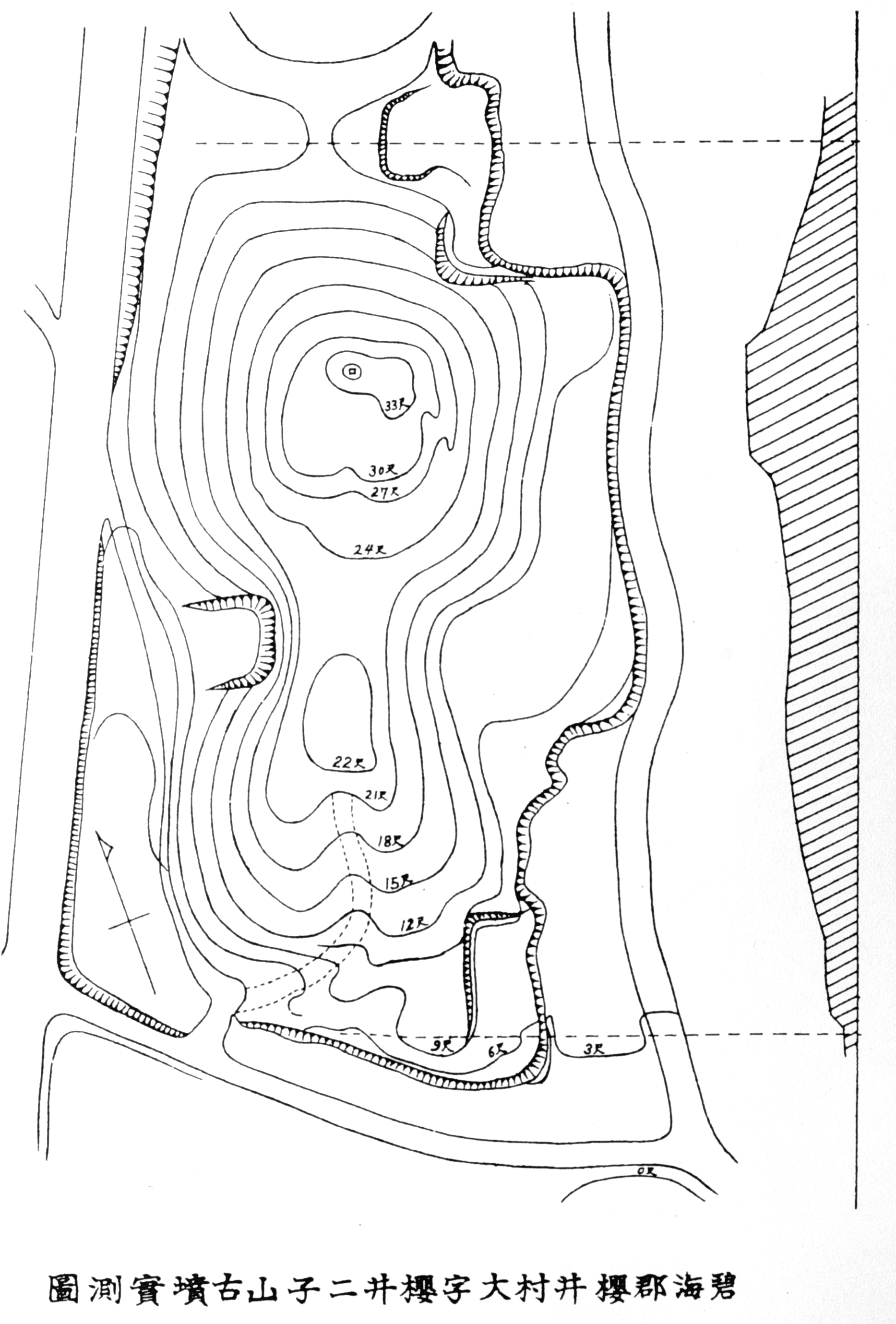
1936 map of Futago Kofun

The Futago Kofun (二子古墳, Futago Kofun) is a Kofun period burial mound, located in the Sakurai neighborhood of the city of Anjō, Aichi in the Tōkai region of Japan. The tumulus was designated a National Historic Site of Japan in 1927, and its borders were expanded in 1955.

== Overview ==
The Futago Kofun is a "two conjoined rectangles" type (zenpō-kōhō-fun (前方後方墳)), located on the Hekikai Plateau in Yahagi River basin in western Mikawa. It is the second largest in the prefecture after the Shōbōji Kofun in Nishio, and the largest of the Sakurai Kofun Group, which also includes the Himeogawa Kofun and twenty other tombs. The tumulus has a total length of 81 meters. The anterior portion has a width of 36 meters and height of 6.7 meters and the posterior portion has a width of 45 meters and height of 10 meters. The summit is flat, and there is a square protrusion about 15 meters square on the east side of the anterior portion, which may have been used as a stage for ceremonial purposes. What appears to be a space for an altar is still in its original form at the west foot. The tumulus is estimated to be around the last half of the 3rd to the first half of the 4th century due to the lack of haniwa or fukiishi. Remnants of a moat remain along its western side.

The Futago Kofun first appears in academic literature in 1887, at which time it was crowned by the small Sakurai Tenjin Jinja Shinto shrine. It was excavated in 1936 and again in 1959 and 1990. In 2003, the Anjō City Board of Education conducted a survey by excavating a total of five trenches. This excavation confirmed the presence of a circumferential moat ten meters wide and one meter deep on the north side of the tumulus. No grave goods have been excavated, but only some fragments of Sue ware pottery.

The site is about 10 minutes on foot from Horiuchikōen Station on the Meitetsu Nishio Line.

== See also ==
- List of Historic Sites of Japan (Aichi)
