= Kita Anjō Station =

Railway station in Anjō, Aichi Prefecture, Japan

Kita Anjō Station 北安城駅

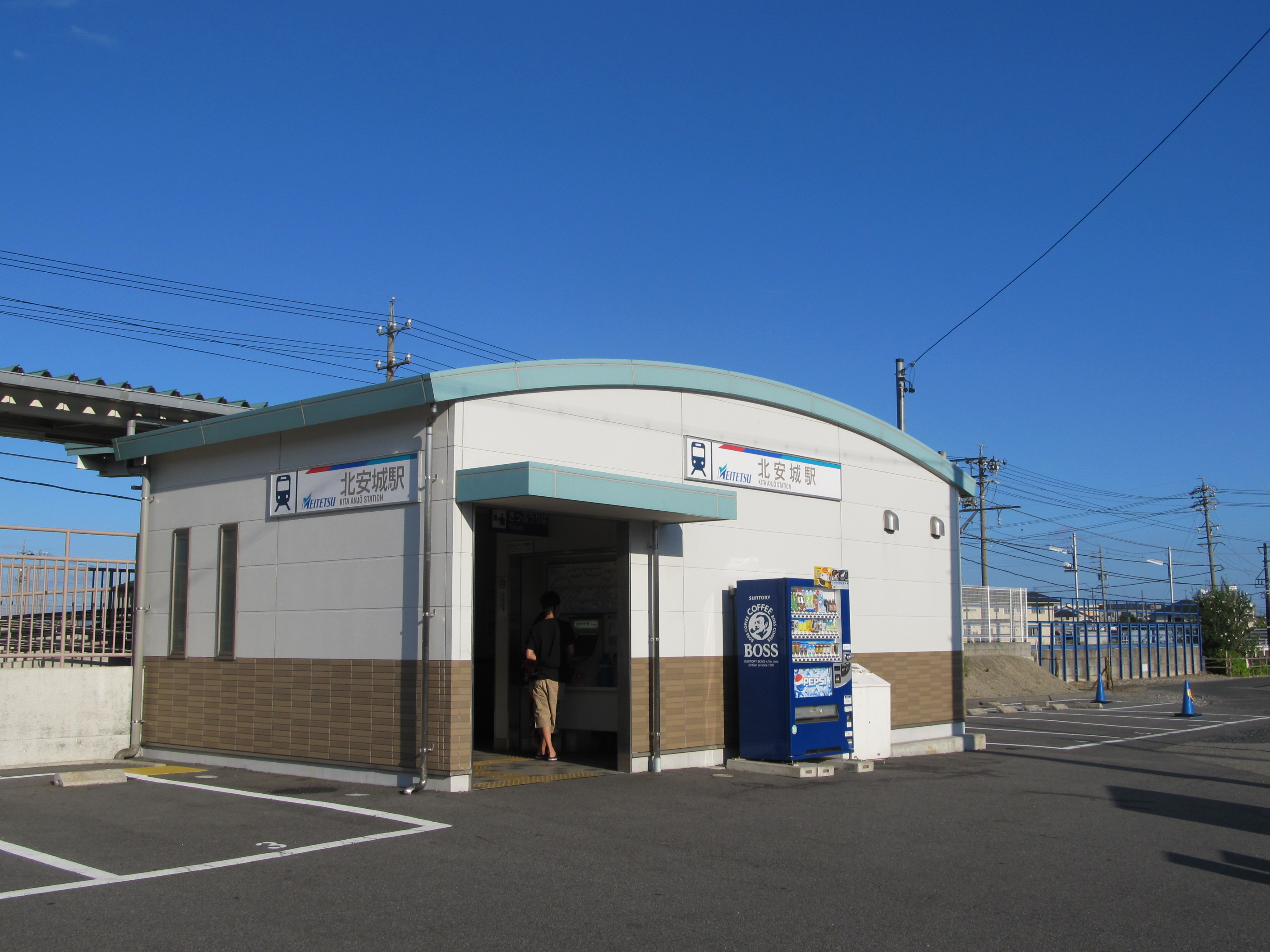
- Kita Anjō Station in August 2012

General information
- Location: 1 Shinsakae Shinden-chō, Anjō-shi, Aichi-ken; Japan
- Coordinates: 34°57′53″N 137°5′31.75″E
- Operator: Meitetsu
- Line: ■ Nishio Line
- Distance: 2.6 kilometers from Shin Anjō
- Platforms: 1 side platform

Other information
- Status: Unstaffed
- Station code: GN01
- Website: Official website

History
- Opened: July 1, 1926

Passengers
- FY2017: 1355 daily

Services
| Preceding station | Meitetsu | Following station |
|---|---|---|
| Shin Anjō Terminus | Nishio Line Express (some trains) | Minami Anjō towards Kira Yoshida |
| Shin Anjō Terminus | Nishio Line Local | Minami Anjō towards Kira Yoshida |
Location
- Location within Aichi Prefecture Location within Japan

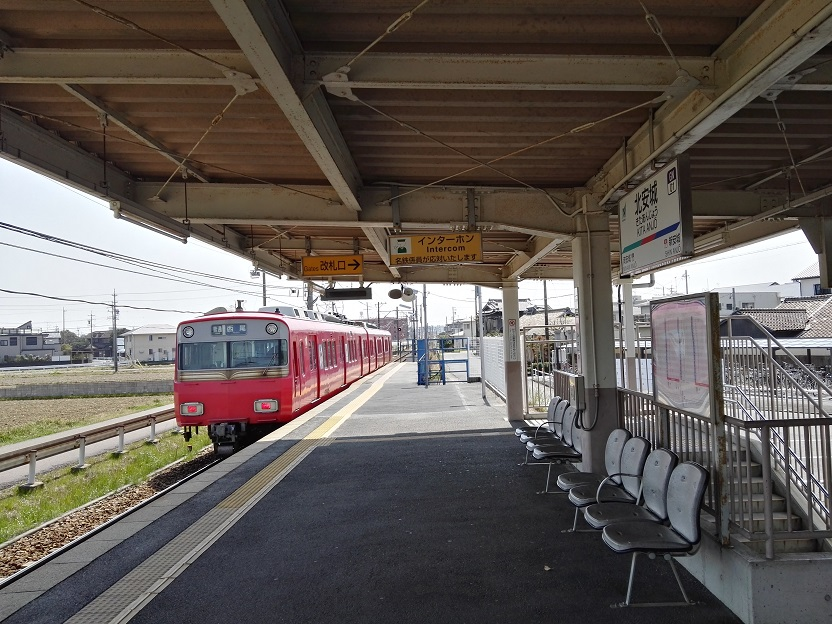
Platforms

Kita Anjō Station (北安城駅, Kita-Anjō-eki) is a railway station in the city of Anjō, Aichi, Japan, operated by Meitetsu.

== Lines ==
Minami Anjō Station is served by the Meitetsu Nishio Line, and is located 2.6 kilometers from the starting point of the line at Shin Anjō.

== Station layout ==
The station has a single side platform for bi-directional traffic. The station is unattended.

== Station history ==
Kita Anjō Station was opened on July 1, 1926 as a station on the privately held Hekikai Electric Railway. Hekikai Electric Railway merged with the Meitetsu Group on May 1, 1944. The station has been unattended since March 1967.

== Passenger statistics ==
In fiscal 2017, the station was used by an average of 1,355 passengers daily (boarding passengers only).

== Surrounding area ==
- Anjō Higashi High School

== See also ==
- List of railway stations in Japan
