= Sakurai Station (Aichi) =

Railway station in Anjō, Aichi Prefecture, Japan

Sakurai Station 桜井駅

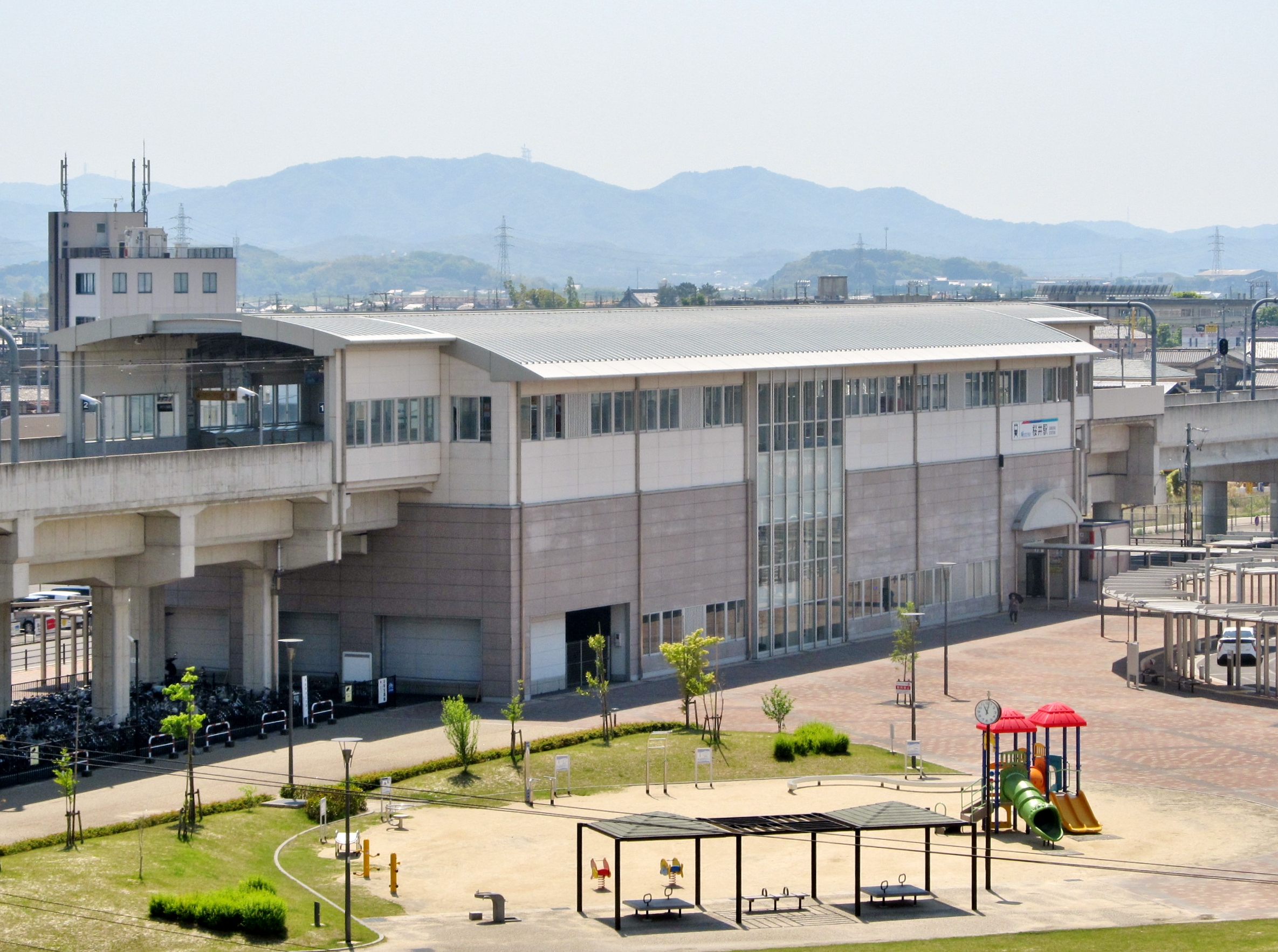
- Sakurai Station in April 2018

General information
- Location: Shinden-19-11 Sakuraichō, Anjō-shi, Aichi-ken 444-1154; Japan
- Coordinates: 34.918°N 137.088°E
- Operator: Meitetsu
- Line: ■ Meitetsu Nishio Line
- Distance: 7.9 kilometers from Shin Anjō
- Platforms: 2 side platforms

Other information
- Status: Staffed
- Station code: GN05
- Website: Official website

History
- Opened: July 1, 1926
- Former names: Hekikai Sakurai (to 2008)

Passengers
- FY2017: 4711 daily

Services
Preceding station	Meitetsu	Following station
Minami Anjō towards Shin Anjō	Nishio Line Limited Express	Nishio towards Kira Yoshida
Minami Anjō towards Shin Anjō	Nishio Line Express	Minami Sakurai towards Kira Yoshida
Hekikai Furui towards Shin Anjō	Nishio Line Express (some trains)	Minami Sakurai towards Kira Yoshida
Horiuchikōen towards Shin Anjō	Nishio Line Local	Minami Sakurai towards Kira Yoshida
Location
- Location within Aichi Prefecture Location within Japan

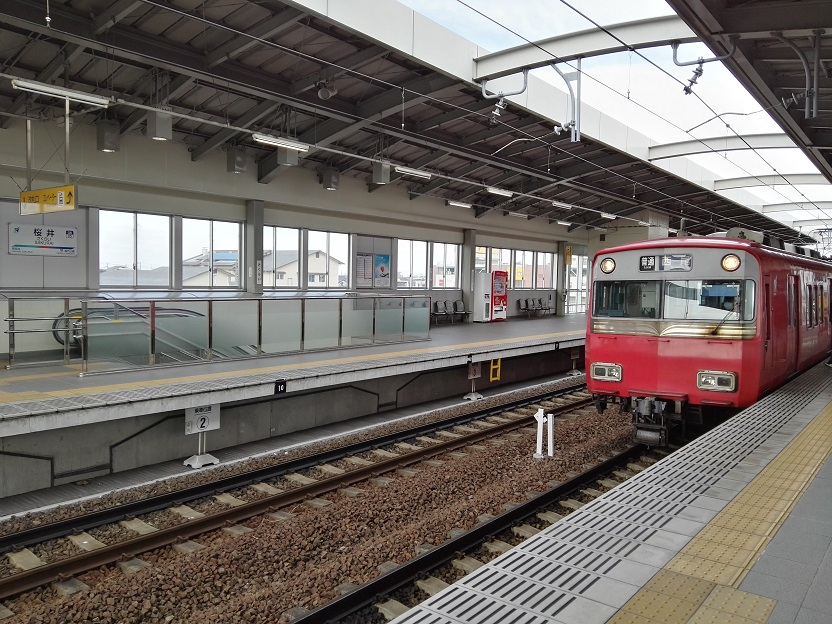
Platforms

Sakurai Station (桜井駅, Sakurai-eki) is a railway station in the city of Anjō, Aichi, Japan, operated by Meitetsu.

== Lines ==
Sakurai Station is served by the Meitetsu Nishio Line, and is located 7.9 kilometers from the starting point of the line at Shin Anjō.

== Station layout ==
The station is an elevated station with a dual opposed side platforms with the station building underneath. The station is staffed.

=== Platforms ===
1	■ Nishio Line	for Shin Anjō
2	■ Nishio Line	for Nishio and Kira Yoshida

== Station history ==
Sakurai Station was opened on July 1, 1926, as Hekikai Sakurai Station (碧海桜井駅) on the privately held Hekikai Electric Railway. Hekikai Electric Railway merged with the Meitetsu Group on May 1, 1944. The tracks were elevated, a new station building was completed and the station renamed to its present name in June 2008.

== Passenger statistics ==
In fiscal 2017, the station was used by an average of 4,711 passengers daily (boarding passengers only).

== Surrounding area ==
- Anjō Minami High School
- Anjō Special Education School

== See also ==
- List of railway stations in Japan
