= Minami-Sakurai Station =

Minami-Sakurai Station (南桜井駅) may refer to:

- Minami Sakurai Station (Aichi)
- Minami-Sakurai Station (Saitama)
