= Shōbōji Kofun =

Burial mound in Tōkai, Japan

- 正法寺古墳 (Japanese)
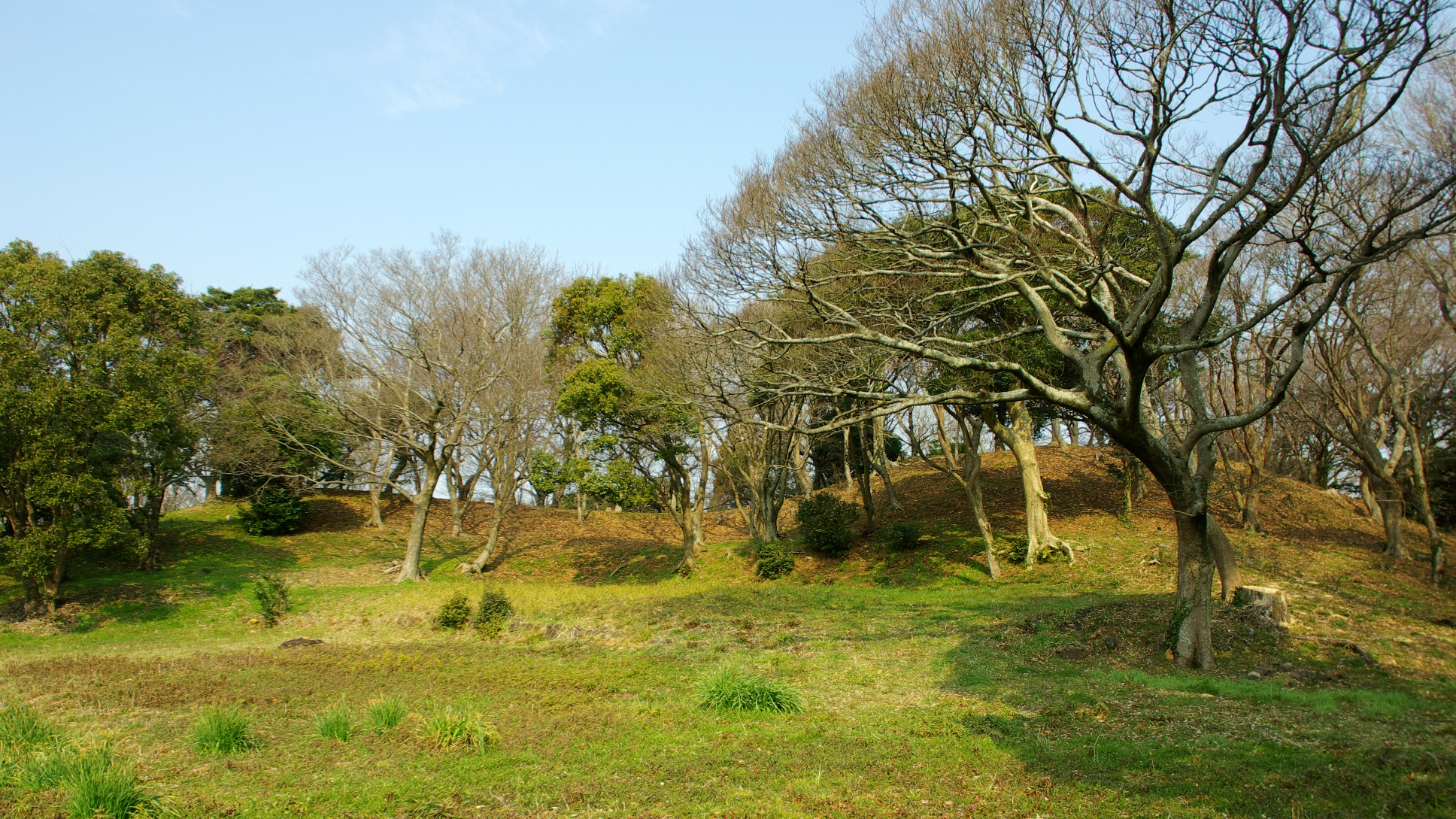
- Shōbōji Kofun

- Shōbōji Kofun Shōbōji Kofun (Japan)
- 34°47′23″N 137°05′07″E
- Type: Kofun
- Periods: Kofun period
- Location: Nishio, Aichi, Japan
- Region: Tōkai region

History
- Built: late 4th to early 5th century

Site notes
- Public access: Yes (park)

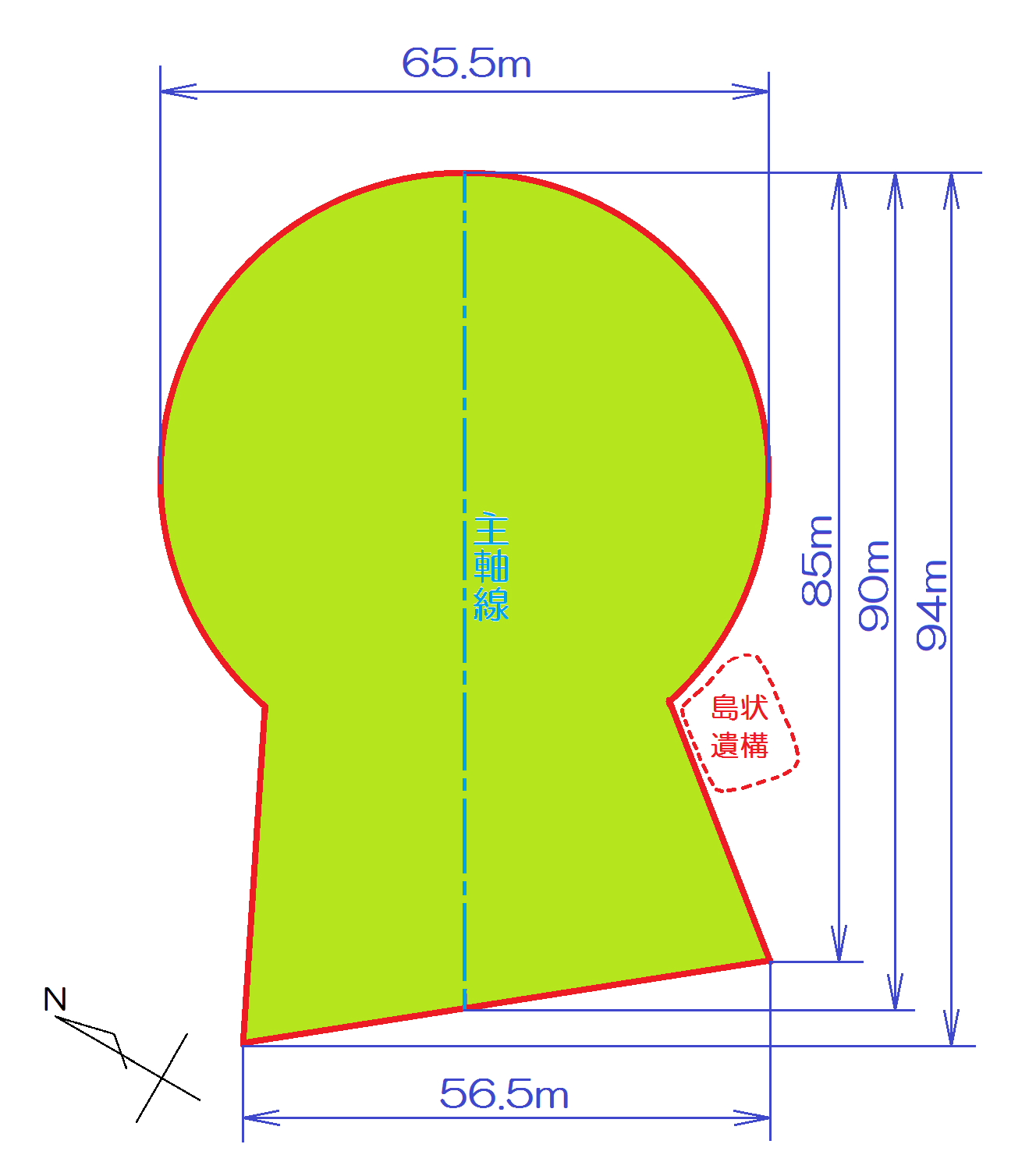
Dimensions of Shōbōji Kofun

The Shōbōji Kofun (正法寺古墳) is a Kofun period burial mound located in the Kira neighborhood of the city of Nishio, Aichi in the Tōkai region of Japan. The tumulus was designated a National Historic Site of Japan in 1936, with the area under protection extended in 2004.

== Overview ==
The Shōbōji Kofun is located near the mouth of the Yahagi River facing Mikawa Bay in central Aichi Prefecture, on what was once a peninsula that extended about 400 meters east from an independent hill at an elevation of 115 meters. The coastline during the Kofun period is estimated to have reached about ten kilometers inland from the present site; however, from ancient and medieval times, land reclamation gradually progressed due to sedimentation of the Yahagi River. The hills within two kilometers around the old burial mound are formed of gabbro, and the stones covering the kofun are almost entirely gabbroic. The soil around the tumulus is reddish-brown clay, which is due to the iron content of gabbro.

The name of "Shōbōji" refers to a Shingon sect temple built by the Ashikaga clan in the early Muromachi period and converted to the Sōtō sect during the Edo period. The tumulus was covered in pine forest during the Edo period and was not recognized as a kofun until after the start of the twentieth century. It was designated as a park in the 1930s but was severely damaged by the Isewan Typhoon in 1959. The site was abandoned and overgrown for many years until the park was revived in 1989 and the dimensions of the kofun surveyed. Although the burial chamber was not opened, a total of 11 trenches were excavated in its sides from 1985 to 2002.

Per the 2001 and 2002 excavation, the tumulus was established to be a three-tiered zenpō-kōen-fun (前方後円墳), which is shaped like a keyhole, having one square end and one circular end, when viewed from above. However, this tumulus is unusual in that the front line is oblique to the main axis. This lack of symmetry was due to the contour of a natural hill, which was incorporated into the tumulus. The first and second tiers were formed by cutting and contouring the natural hill, and the uppermost level was added as an embankment. The total length of the tumulus is 94 meters. The anterior rectangular portion is 55 meters wide and 6 meters high, and then the posterior circular portion has a diameter of 62 meters and a height of eight meters. The mound was covered with fukiishi made from natural stone split stones found in the vicinity, rather than rounded river stones, which was more typical. Numerous cylindrical haniwa have been uncovered at the site (although none in situ and none with any decoration) as well as numerous Sue ware pottery shards. The haniwa dates the construction of the tumulus to the late 4th to early 5th century.

Currently, the tumulus is maintained as an archaeological park. It is located about five minutes by car from Kira-Yoshida Station on the Meitetsu Nishio Line.

== See also ==
- List of Historic Sites of Japan (Aichi)
