= Meitetsu Nishio Line =

Railway line in Aichi Prefecture, Japan

Nishio Line

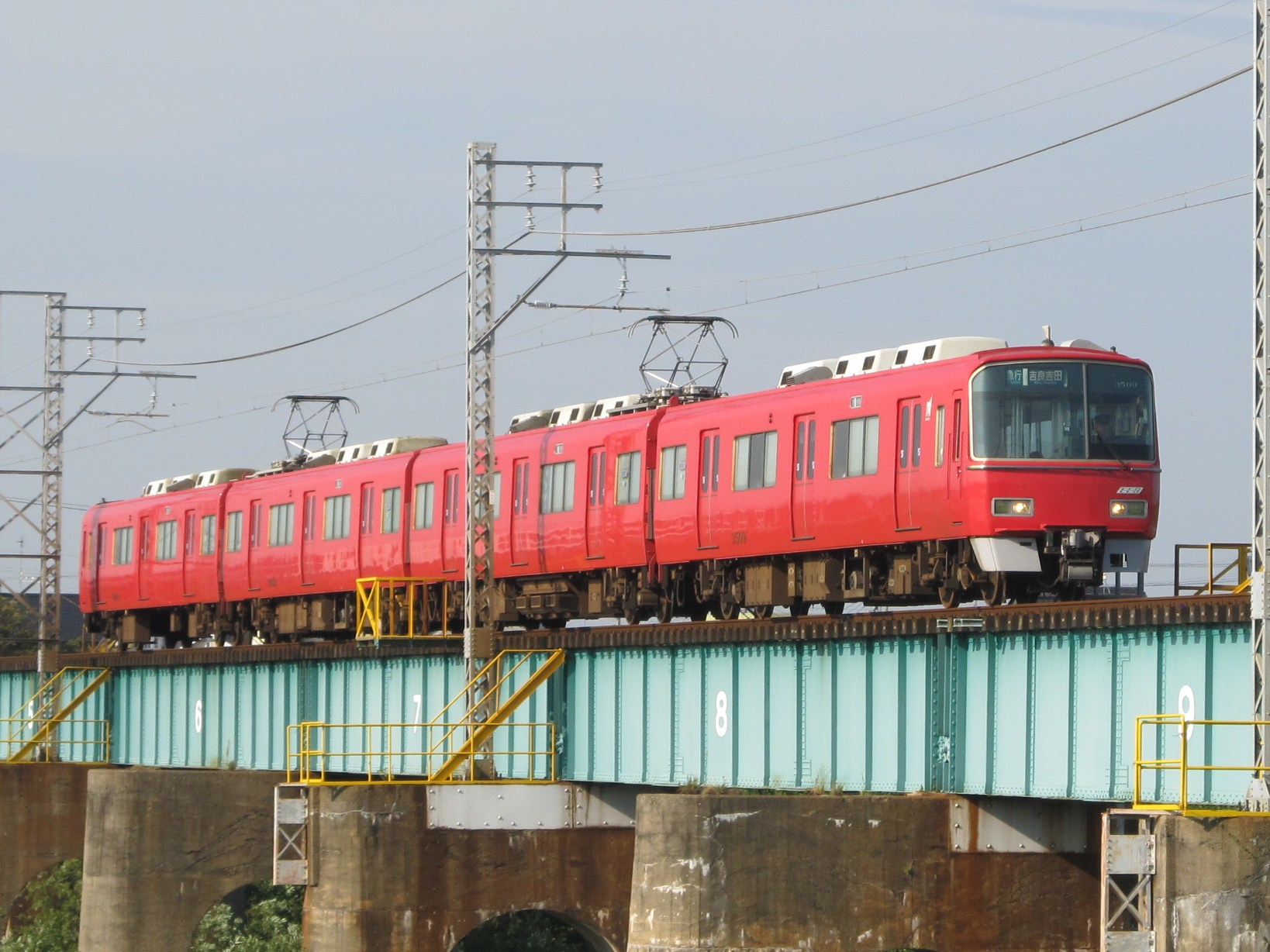
- A Meitetsu 3500 series EMU crossing the Yonezu Bridge

Overview
- Native name: 西尾線
- Status: In service
- Owner: Nagoya Railroad Co., Ltd.
- Line number: GN
- Locale: Anjō; Nishio
- Termini: Shin Anjō; Kira Yoshida
- Stations: 14

Service
- Type: Commuter rail
- System: Meitetsu
- Operator(s): Nagoya Railroad Co., Ltd.

History
- Opened: 30 October 1911; 114 years ago

Technical
- Line length: 24.7 km (15.35 mi)
- Track gauge: 1,067 mm (3 ft 6 in)
- Electrification: 1,500 V DC
- Operating speed: 100 km/h (62 mph)

The Nishio Line (西尾線, Nishio-sen) is a railway line operated by the private railway operator Nagoya Railroad (Meitetsu) in Aichi Prefecture, Japan, connecting Shin Anjō and Kira Yoshida. It originally included a branch from Nishio-guchi to Okazaki-shin on the Tokaido Main Line, which closed in 1962 (see History section below).

== Stations ==
No.	Station		Distance (km)	Local	Express	Limited Express	Transfers	Location	
NH17	Shin Anjō	新安城	0.0	●	●	●	Nagoya Main Line (NH17)	Anjō	Aichi Prefecture
GN01	Kita Anjō	北安城	2.6	●	▲	｜		Anjō	Aichi Prefecture
GN02	Minami Anjō	南安城	4.0	●	●	●		Anjō	Aichi Prefecture
GN03	Hekikai Furui	碧海古井	5.7	●	▲	｜		Anjō	Aichi Prefecture
GN04	Horiuchikōen	堀内公園	6.7	●	｜	｜		Anjō	Aichi Prefecture
GN05	Sakurai	桜井	7.9	●	●	●		Anjō	Aichi Prefecture
GN06	Minami Sakurai	南桜井	9.5	●	●	｜		Anjō	Aichi Prefecture
GN07	Yonezu	米津	11.6	●	●	｜		Nishio	Aichi Prefecture
GN08	Sakuramachi-mae	桜町前	13.0	●	●	｜		Nishio	Aichi Prefecture
GN09	Nishioguchi	西尾口	14.2	●	｜	｜		Nishio	Aichi Prefecture
GN10	Nishio	西尾	15.0	●	●	●		Nishio	Aichi Prefecture
GN11	Fukuchi	福地	17.4	●	●	●		Nishio	Aichi Prefecture
GN12	Kami Yokosuka	上横須賀	20.5	●	●	●		Nishio	Aichi Prefecture
GN13	Kira Yoshida	吉良吉田	24.7	●	●	●	Gamagōri Line (GN13)	Nishio	Aichi Prefecture

●：Stop ▲：Partial stop ｜：Pass

== History ==
The Nishio Railway opened the Okazaki-shin to (old) Nishio section in 1911 as a 762 mm (2 ft 6 in) gauge line, and extended it to Kira Yoshida between 1915 and 1916. In 1926, the line was acquired by the Aichi Electric Railway, which between 1928 and 1929 converted the line to 1,067 mm (3 ft 6 in) gauge, electrified it at 600 V DC, and connected to the line from Shin Anjō (see below) at Nishio-guchi, abandoning the 762 mm gauge section between there and Kami Yokosuka. That company merged with Meitetsu in 1935.

In the meantime, the Hekikai Electric Railway opened the Shin Anjō to Yonezu section, electrified at 1,500 V DC, in 1926, and extended the line to Nishio in 1928, with a connection to Kami Yokosuka opening in 1930. The company merged with Meitetsu in 1944.

The section from Nishio-guchi to Okazaki-shin was closed between 1959 and 1962, with the voltage on the Nishio to Kira Yoshida section being raised to 1,500 V DC in 1960.

With the start of the revised timetable on 16 March 2019, Nishio Line Express services began stopping at Minami Sakurai Station, and Semi-Express services were discontinued.

=== Former connecting lines ===
- Minami Anjo Station: The Hekikai Electric Railway opened a 1 km 1,067 mm gauge freight-only line electrified at 1,500 V DC to Anjo in 1939. The company merged with Meitetsu in 1944, which commenced passenger services in 1950. The line closed in 1961.
- Nishio Station: The Nishio Railway opened a 5 km 762 mm gauge line to Heisaka Port in 1914. Following the company merging with Aichi Electric Railway Co. in 1926, the line was converted to 1,067 mm gauge and electrified at 600 V DC in 1928. The line closed in 1960 when the Nishio line voltage was increased to 1,500 V DC.

== See also ==
- List of railway lines in Japan
