= Nishio Station =

Railway station in Nishio, Aichi Prefecture, Japan

Nishio Station 西尾駅

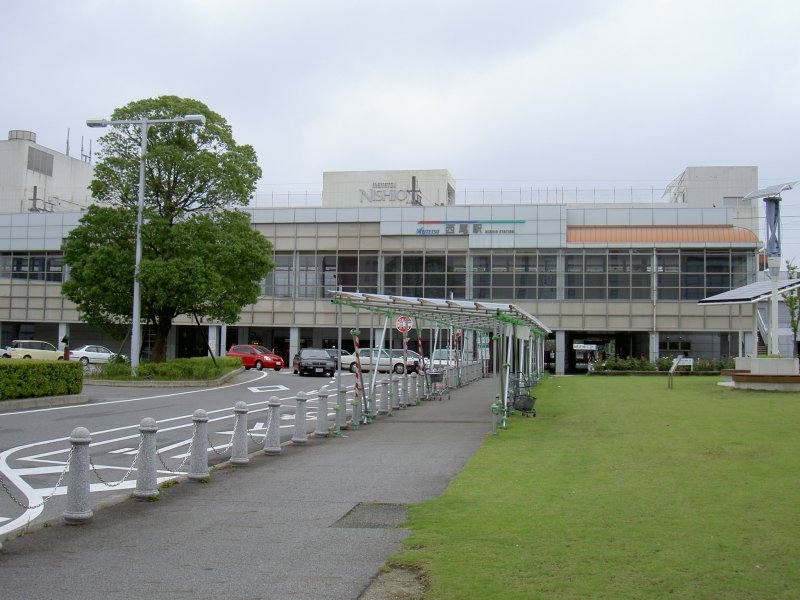
- Nishio Station in July 2005

General information
- Location: 4-18 Sumiyoshichō, Nishio-shi, Aichi-ken 445-0851; Japan
- Coordinates: 34.8643°N 137.0574°E
- Operator: Meitetsu
- Line: ■ Meitetsu Nishio Line
- Distance: 15.0 kilometers from Shin Anjō
- Platforms: 1 island platform

Other information
- Status: Staffed
- Station code: GN10
- Website: Official website

History
- Opened: October 30, 1911

Passengers
- FY2017: 5263 daily

Services
Preceding station	Meitetsu	Following station
Sakurai towards Shin Anjō	Nishio Line Limited Express	Terminus
Sakuramachi-mae towards Shin Anjō	Nishio Line Express	Fukuchi towards Kira Yoshida
Nishioguchi towards Shin Anjō	Nishio Line Local	Fukuchi towards Kira Yoshida
Location
- Location within Aichi Prefecture Location within Japan

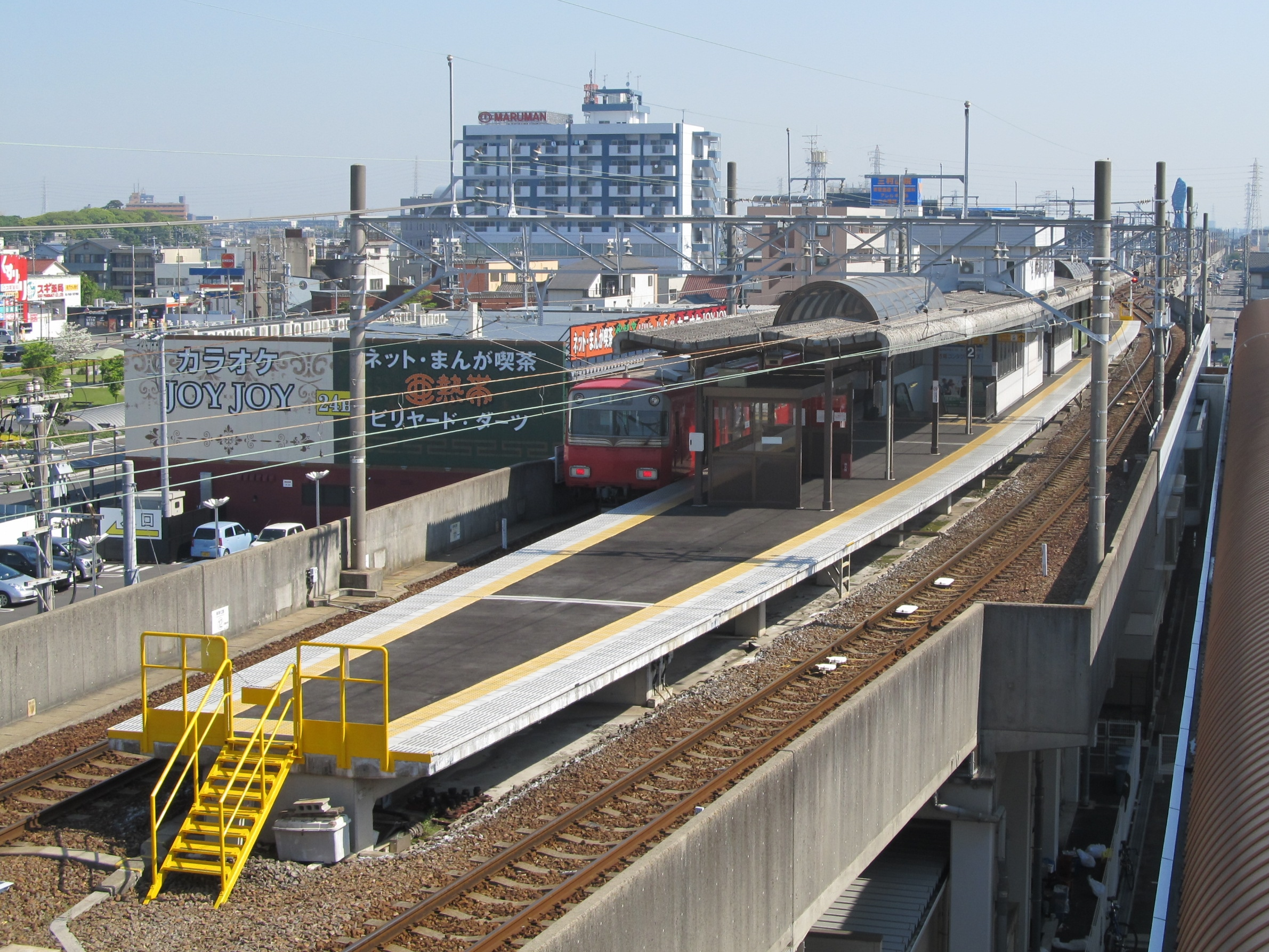
Platform

track layout

Nishio Station (西尾駅, Nishio-eki) is a railway station in the city of Nishio, Aichi, Japan, operated by Meitetsu.

== Lines ==
Nishio Station is served by the Meitetsu Nishio Line, and is located 15.0 kilometers from the starting point of the line at Shin Anjō.

== Station layout ==
The station has one elevated island platform with the station building located underneath. The station has automated ticket machines, Manaca automated turnstiles and is attended.

=== Platforms ===
1	■ Nishio Line	for Shin Anjō, Meitetsu Nagoya and Kira Yoshida normal trains
2	■ Nishio Line	for Shin Anjō, Meitetsu Nagoya and Kira Yoshida express trains

== Station history ==
Nishio Station was opened on October 30, 1911, as a station on the privately held Nishio Railway. It was relocated to its present location on October 1, 1928. On December 21, 1926, the Nishio Railway merged with the Aichi Electric Railway, which was acquired by the Meitetsu Group on August 1, 1935. The station building was completed in December 1973. The tracks were elevated in July 1989.

== Passenger statistics ==
In fiscal 2017, the station was used by an average of 5263 passengers daily (boarding passengers only).

== Surrounding area ==
- Nishio city hall
- Nishio Shinken Bank head office

== See also ==
- List of railway stations in Japan
