= Shin Anjō Station =

Railway station in Anjō, Aichi Prefecture, Japan

Shin Anjō Station 新安城駅

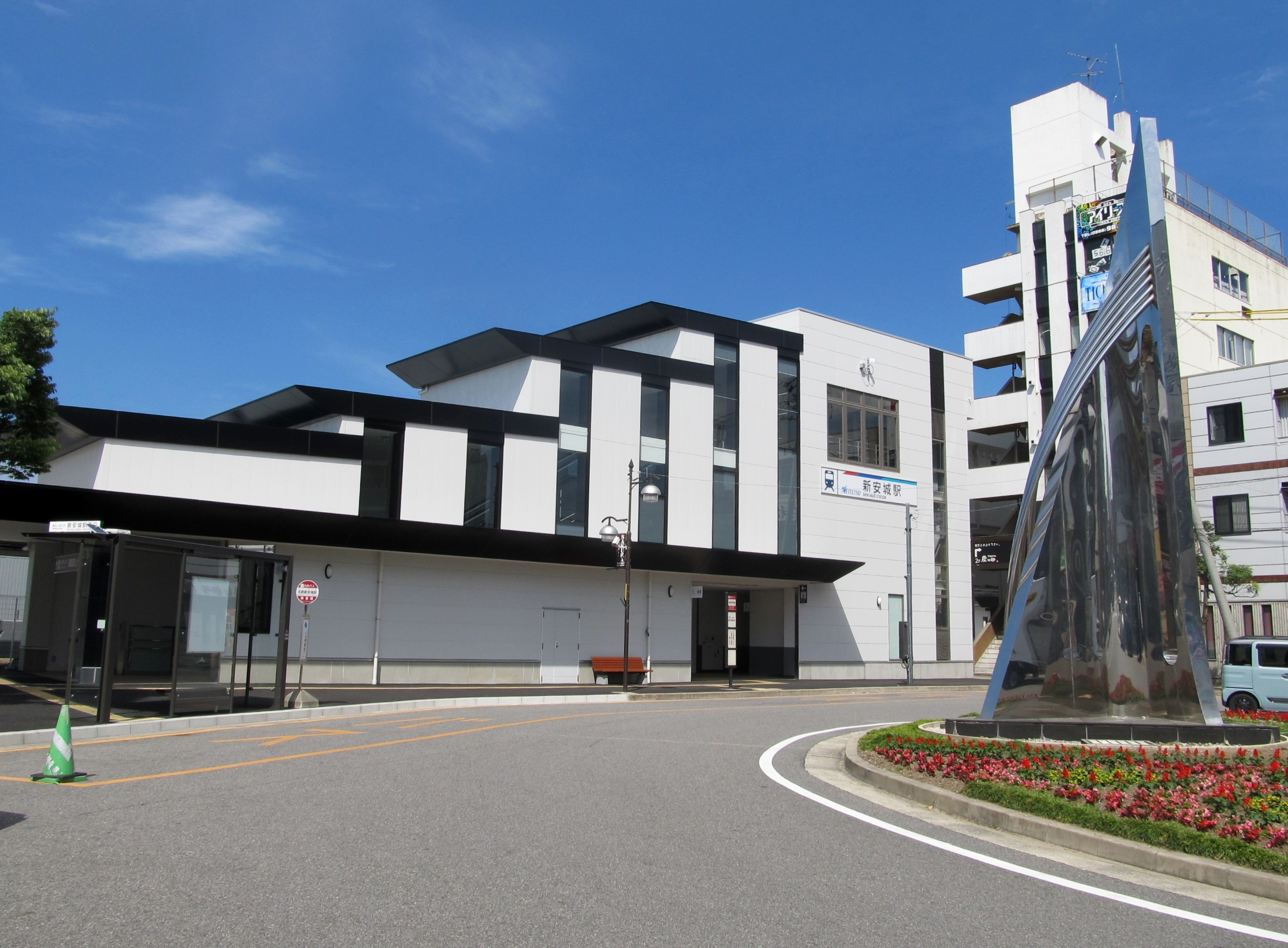
- Shin Anjō Station south exit in June 2021

General information
- Location: 1-chōme-1-5 Tōeichō, Anjō-shi, Aichi-ken 446-0007; Japan
- Coordinates: 34.9870732°N 137.0851868°E
- Operator: Meitetsu
- Lines: Nagoya Main Line; Nishio Line
- Distance: 38.5 kilometers from Toyohashi
- Platforms: 3 island platforms

Other information
- Status: Staffed
- Station code: NH17
- Website: Official website

History
- Opened: 1 June 1923; 103 years ago
- Former names: Imamura (until 1970)

Passengers
- FY2017: 22,864 daily

Services
Preceding station	Meitetsu	Following station
Higashi Okazaki towards Toyohashi	Nagoya Main Line Limited Express Express	Chiryū towards Meitetsu Gifu
Yahagibashi towards Ina	Nagoya Main Line Semi-Express	Chiryū towards Meitetsu Gifu
Utō towards Ina	Nagoya Main Line Local	Ushida towards Meitetsu Gifu
through to Nagoya Main Line	Nishio Line Limited Express Express	Minami Anjō towards Kira Yoshida
through to Nagoya Main Line	Nishio Line Local	Kita Anjō towards Kira Yoshida
Location
- Location within Aichi Prefecture Location within Japan

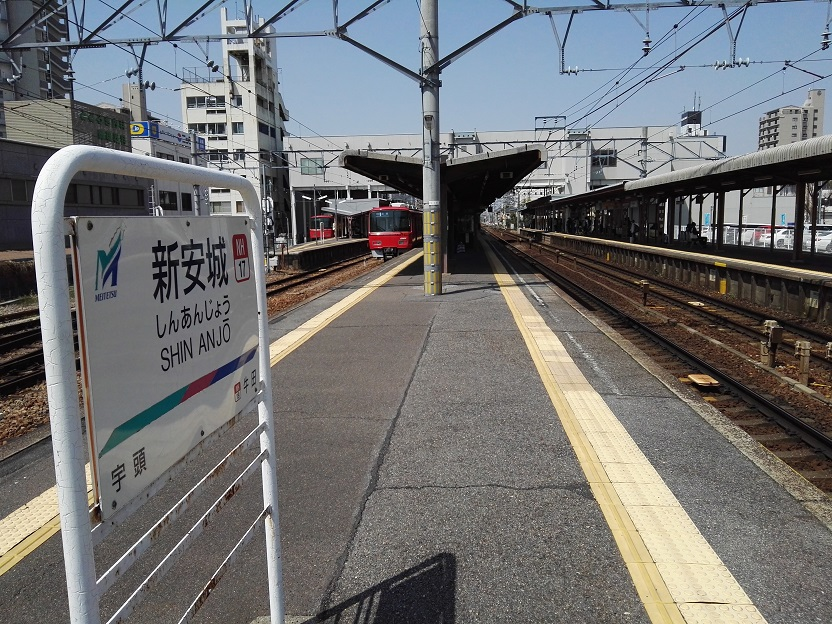
Platforms

Shin Anjō Station (新安城駅, Shin-Anjō-eki) is a railway station in the city of Anjō, Aichi, Japan, operated by Meitetsu.

== Lines ==
Shin Anjō Station is served by the Meitetsu Nagoya Main Line and Meitetsu Nishio Line. It is a terminus for the 24.7 kilometer Nishio Line, and lies 38.5 kilometers from the terminus of the Nagoya Main Line at Toyohashi Station.

== Station layout ==
The station has three island platforms serving six tracks connected by a footbridge. Track one terminates at this station. The station is staffed.

=== Platforms ===
1	■ Meitetsu Nishio Line	for Nishio and Kira-Yoshida
2	■ Meitetsu Meitetsu Nishio Line	for Nishio and Kira Yoshida
3	■ Nagoya Main Line	for Meitetsu Nagoya, Meitetsu Gifu, and Inuyama (also from the Nishio Line)
4	■ Meitetsu Nagoya Main Line	for Meitetsu Nagoya, Meitetsu Gifu, and Inuyama
5	■ Meitetsu Nagoya Main Line	for Higashi Okazaki and Toyohashi
6	■ Meitetsu Nagoya Main Line	for Higashi Okazaki and Toyohashi

Shin Anjō Station track diagram

== Station history ==
The station opened on 1 June 1923, as Imamura Station (今村駅, Imamura-eki) on the privately owned Aichi Electric Railway, which was acquired by the Meitetsu Group on 1 August 1935. The station was renamed Shin Anjo on 1 May 1970.

== Passenger statistics ==
In fiscal 2017, the station was used by an average of 22,864 passengers daily (boarding passengers only).

== Surrounding area ==
- Makita head office

== See also ==
- List of railway stations in Japan
