= Kira Yoshida Station =

Railway station in Nishio, Aichi Prefecture, Japan

Kira Yoshida Station 吉良吉田駅

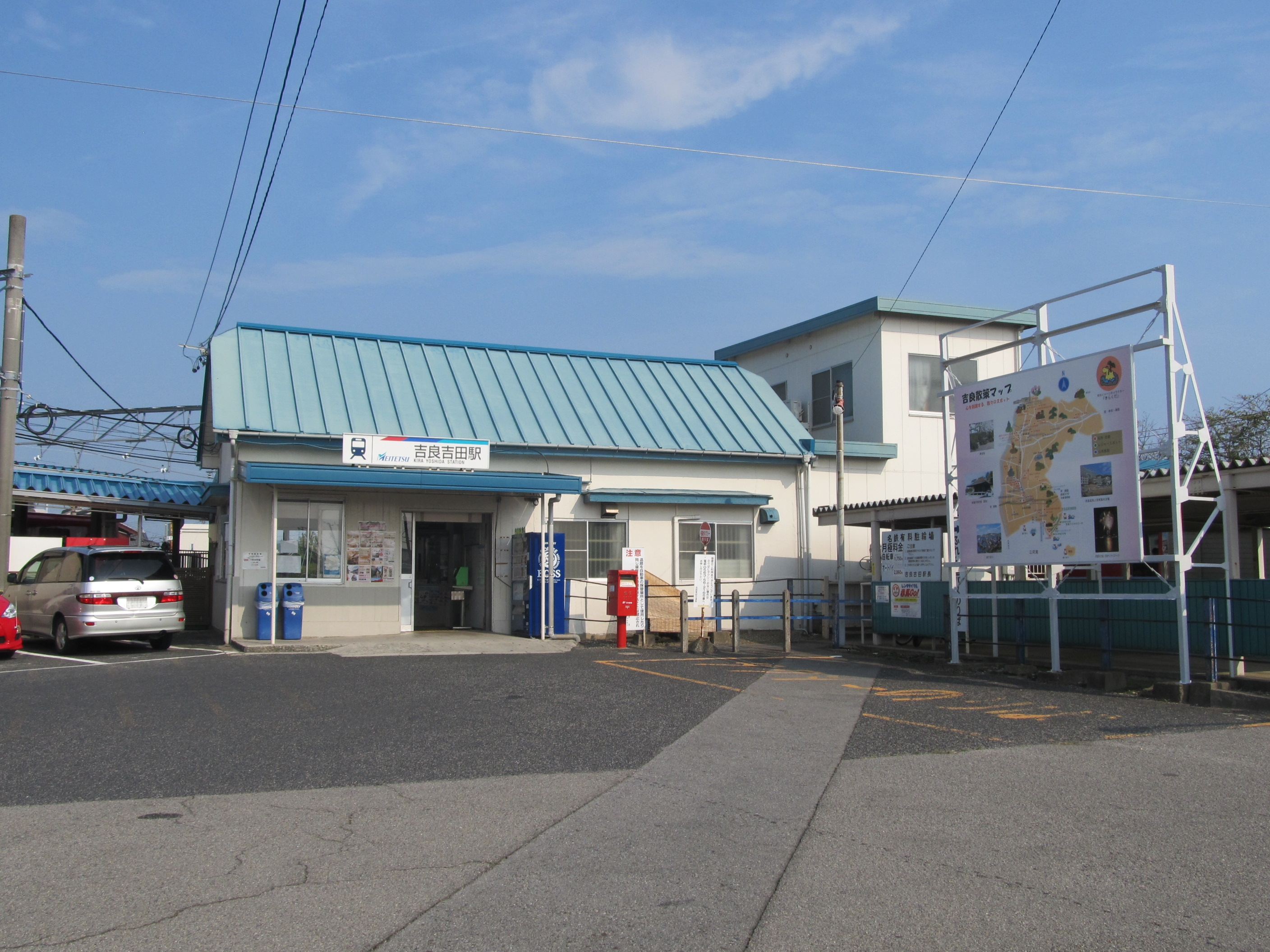
- Kira Yoshida Station in September 2014

General information
- Location: Funato-5 Kirachō Yoshida, Nishio-shi, Aichi-ken 444-0516; Japan
- Coordinates: 34.7940°N 137.0712°E
- Operator: Meitetsu
- Lines: ■ Meitetsu Nishio Line; ■ Meitetsu Gamagōri Line
- Distance: 11.6 kilometers from Shin Anjō
- Platforms: 4 side platforms

Other information
- Status: Staffed
- Station code: GN13
- Website: Official website

History
- Opened: August 25, 1928
- Former names: Mikawa Yoshida (until 1960)

Passengers
- FY2017: 1452 daily

Services
Preceding station	Meitetsu	Following station
Terminus	Gamagōri Line	Mikawa Toba towards Gamagōri
Kami Yokosuka towards Shin Anjō	Nishio Line Express Local	Terminus
Location
- Location within Aichi Prefecture Location within Japan

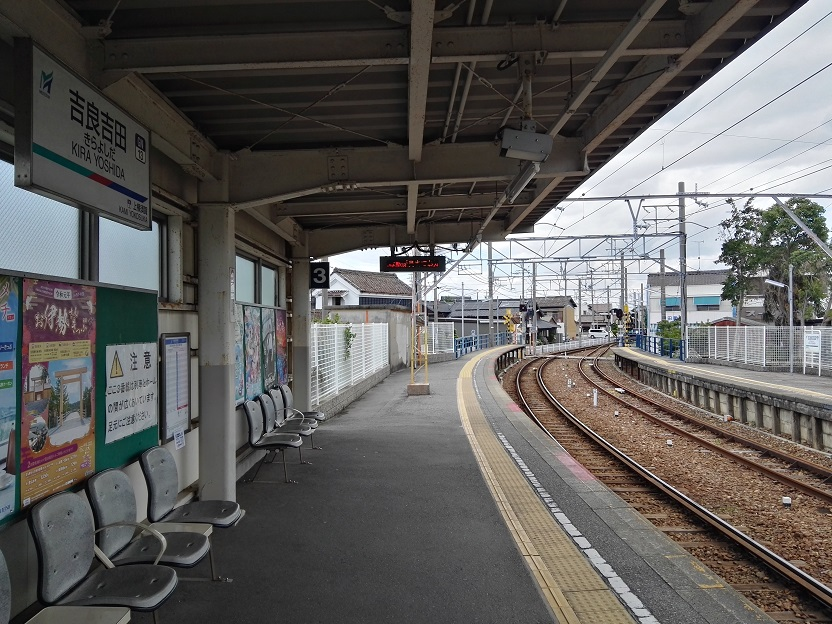
Platform

Track Layout

Kira Yoshida Station (吉良吉田駅, Kira Yoshida-eki) is a railway station in the city of Nishio, Aichi, Japan, operated by Meitetsu.

== Lines ==
Kira Yoshida Station is a served by the Meitetsu Nishio Line, and is located 24.7 kilometers from the starting point of the line at Shin Anjō. It is also a terminus of the Meitetsu Gamagōri Line, and is located 17.6 kilometers from the starting point of the line at Gamagori.

== Station layout ==
The station has two pairs of opposed side platforms. Each pair is set at an angle to each other, forming a "V" shape. Platform one is not in use. The station has automated ticket machines, Manaca automated turnstiles and is attended.

=== Platforms ===
2	■ Meitetsu Gamagōri Line	for Gamagōri
3	■ Meitetsu Gamagōri Line	for Nishio, Shin Anjō and Meitetsu Nagoya
4	■ Meitetsu Nishio Line	for Nishio, Shin Anjō and Meitetsu Nagoya

== Station history ==
Kira Yoshida Station was opened on August 25, 1928, as Mikawa Yoshida Station (三河吉田駅, Mikawa Yoshida-eki) on the Mikawa Railway. The station was renamed to its present name on November 1, 1960.

== Passenger statistics ==
In fiscal 2017, the station was used by an average of 1452 passengers daily (boarding passengers only).

== Surrounding area ==
- former Kira Town Hall
- Yoshida Elementary School

== See also ==
- List of railway stations in Japan
