= Meitetsu Group =

The Meitetsu Group (名鉄グループ, Meitetsu Gurūpu) of companies centers on the Nagoya Railroad railway company, which links Nagoya and its suburbs. Many companies in the group are designed to enhance the value of the Meitetsu rail network. In addition to the railroad system, the group includes other companies in transportation, real-estate, retail, leisure, and cultural endeavors. Here is a partial list of companies in the Meitetsu Group.

== Transportation ==
- Meitetsu
- Toyohashi Railroad
- Hokuriku Railroad
- Ōigawa Railway
- Meitetsu Bus
- Meitetsu Kanko Bus
- Gifu Bus
- Chita Noriai
- Meitetsu Taxi
- Meitetsu Unyu
- Taiheiyō Ferry
- Ontake Kotsu
- Miyagi Kotsu
- Abashiri Bus

== Real estate ==
- Meitetsu Real Estate

== Retail ==
- Meitetsu Department Stores
- Meitetsu Yakuhin
- Kanazawa Meitetsu Marukoshi Department Store
- Pare Marche

== Leisure ==
- Meitetsu Grand Hotel
- Gifu Grand Hotel
- Meitetsu Inuyama Hotel
  - Joan
- Meitetsu Impress
  - Meiji Mura
  - Japan Monkey Park
  - Sugimoto Museum
  - Little World Museum of Man
  - Minamichita Beach Land
- Komagatake Ropeway
- Shinhotaka Ropeway
