= Hirai Junction =

Railway junction in Toyokawa, Aichi Prefecture, Japan

Coordinates: 34°47′40.6″N 137°21′40.2″E

Railway track

Hirai Junction (平井信号場, Hirai shingōjō) is a junction at Toyokawa, Aichi, Japan, The junction was merged to Kozakai Station in 1963, although the function and the name still remains for Meitetsu section of the junction.

== Lines ==
- Central Japan Railway Company (JR Central)
  - Iida Line
- Nagoya Railroad
  - Nagoya Main Line

Two single tracks exist between this junction and Toyohashi Station. The eastern one (in the diagram above) is the Meitetsu Nagoya Main Line and the western one is the Iida Line. They are combined and used as a double track.

There are two JR stations (Shimoji Station and Funamachi Station) on this section of Iida line. Meitetsu trains do not stop at these stations.

== History ==
The junction opened on June 1, 1927. In August 1943 the Toyokawa Railway was nationalized, and the junction was renamed with a different Kanji script, although the pronunciation did not change. The junction for JNR was abolished and merged with Kozakai Station on 17 December 1963, although the junction remains for Meitetsu.
