= Ushikubo Station =

Railway station in Toyokawa, Aichi Prefecture, Japan

CD04 Ushikubo Station 牛久保駅
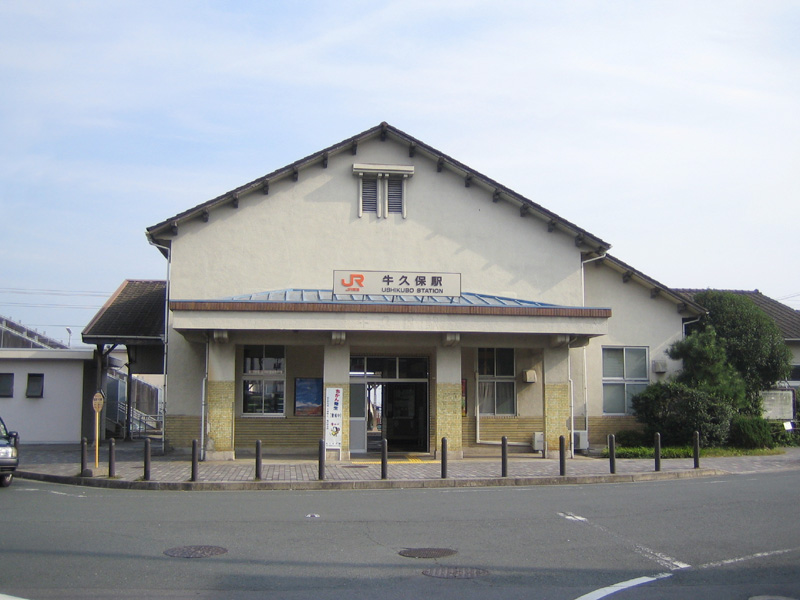
- Ushikubo Station in September 2005

General information
- Location: Shiroato-55 Ushikubochō, Toyokawa-shi, Aichi-ken 442-0826; Japan
- Coordinates: 34.8085°N 137.3817°E
- Operator: JR Central
- Line: Iida Line
- Distance: 6.6 kilometers from Toyohashi
- Platforms: 2 side platforms

Other information
- Status: Unstaffed station (Automatic ticket vending machines installed.)
- Station code: CD04

History
- Opened: July 15, 1897

Passengers
- FY2017: 877 daily
Location
- Location within Aichi Prefecture Location within Japan

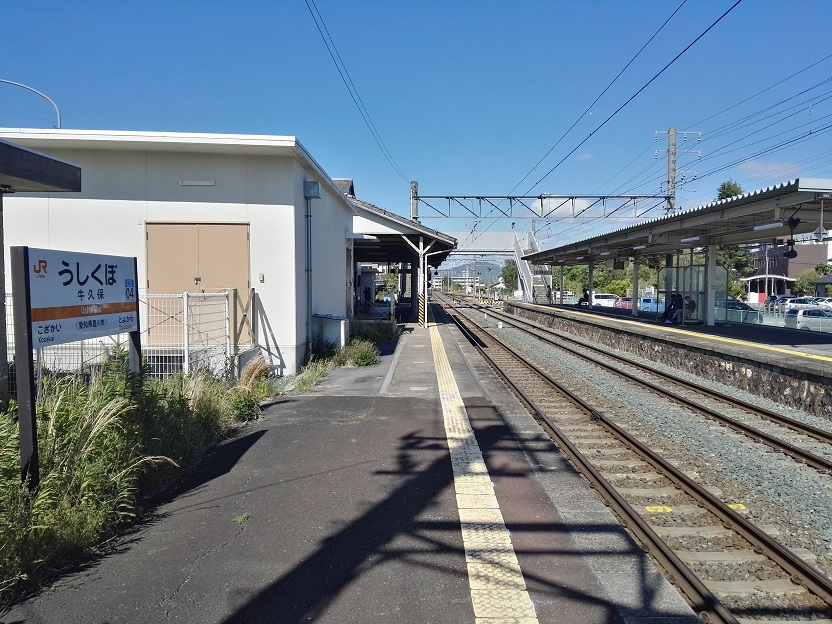
Platform

Ushikubo Station (牛久保駅, Ushikubo-eki) is a railway station in the city of Toyokawa, Aichi Prefecture, Japan, operated by Central Japan Railway Company (JR Tōkai).

== Lines ==
Ushikubo Station is served by the Iida Line, and is located 6.6 kilometers from the southern terminus of the line at Toyohashi Station.

== Station layout ==
The station has two opposed side platforms connected by a footbridge. The station building has automated ticket machines, TOICA automated turnstiles and has a Customer support service.

=== Platforms ===
1	■ Iida Line	For Toyohashi
2	■ Iida Line	For Toyokawa, Iida

== Adjacent stations ==
«	Service	»
Central Japan Railway Company
Iida Line
Limited Express "Inaji" (特急「伊那路」): Does not stop at this station
Kozakai	Local (普通)	Toyokawa

== Station history ==
Ushikubo Station was established on July 15, 1897; 129 years ago as a station on the now-defunct Toyokawa Railway (豊川鉄道, Toyokawa Tetsudō) connecting Toyohashi with Toyokawa. On August 1, 1943, the Toyokawa Railway was nationalized along with some other local lines to form the Japanese Government Railways (JGR) Iida Line. Due to the expansion of traffic at the nearby Toyokawa Naval Arsenal, the station buildingw was also rebuilt in 1943; this building survived the Toyokawa Air Raid and is still used as the station building to date. Scheduled freight operations were discontinued in 1971. Along with its division and privatization of JNR on April 1, 1987, the station came under the control and operation of the Central Japan Railway Company (JR Tōkai).

Station numbering was introduced to the Iida Line in March 2018; Ushikubo Station was assigned station number CE04.

== Passenger statistics ==
In fiscal 2017, the station was used by an average of 877 passengers daily.

== Surrounding area ==
- site of Ushikubo Castle
- Ushikubo Elementary School

== See also ==
- List of railway stations in Japan
