= Funamachi Station =

Railway station in Toyohashi, Aichi Prefecture, Japan

CD01 Funamachi Station 船町駅
- Funamachi Station

General information
- Location: Kitajima Kitajimacho, Toyohashi-shi, Aichi-ken 440-0071; Japan
- Coordinates: 34.7759°N 137.3732°E
- Operator: JR Central
- Line: Iida Line
- Distance: 1.5 kilometers from Toyohashi
- Platforms: 2 side platforms

Other information
- Status: Unstaffed
- Station code: CD01

History
- Opened: August 1, 1943

Passengers
- FY2017: 225 daily
Location
- Location within Aichi Prefecture Location within Japan

Funamachi Station (船町駅, Funamachi-eki) is a railway station in the city of Toyohashi, Aichi Prefecture, Japan, operated by Central Japan Railway Company (JR Tōkai).

== Lines ==
Funamachi Station is served by the Iida Line, and is located 1.5 kilometers from the southern terminus of the line at Toyohashi Station.

The Iida Line shares tracks with the Meitetsu Nagoya Main Line between Toyohashi and Hirai Junction, so Meitetsu trains pass through Funamachi Station. However, Meitetsu trains do not stop here.

== Station layout ==
The station has two side platforms built on an embankment, connected by an underpass crossing. The area in between the side platforms is filled in, forming what is effectively an island platform. The station building has automated ticket machines, TOICA automated turnstiles and is unattended.

=== Platforms ===
1	■ Iida Line	For Toyokawa and Iida
2	■ Iida Line	For Toyohashi

== Adjacent stations ==
«	Service	»
Central Japan Railway Company
Iida Line
All services on Meitetsu (Sharing tracks with Ilda Line): Does not stop at this station
Limited Express "Inaji" (特急「伊那路」): Does not stop at this station
Toyohashi	Local (普通)	Shimoji

== Station history ==
Funamachi Station was established on June 1, 1927 as Shin-Funamachi Temporary Stop (新船町停留場, Shin-Funamachi Teiryujo) on the now-defunct Toyokawa Railway (豊川鉄道, Toyokawa Tetsudō) connecting Toyohashi with Toyokawa. On August 1, 1943, the Toyokawa Railway was nationalized along with some other local lines to form the Japanese Government Railways (JGR) Iida Line and Funamachi became a full station at that time. The station has been unattended since April 1985. Along with its division and privatization of JNR on April 1, 1987, the station came under the control and operation of the Central Japan Railway Company.

Station numbering was introduced to the Iida Line in March 2018; Funamachi Station was assigned station number CE01.

== Passenger statistics ==
In fiscal 2017, the station was used by an average of 225 passengers daily.

== Surrounding area ==
- Toyokawa River
- Japan National Route 1

== See also ==
- List of railway stations in Japan
