= Mikawa-Ichinomiya Station =

Railway station in Toyokawa, Aichi Prefecture, Japan

Mikawa-Ichinomiya Station 三河一宮駅
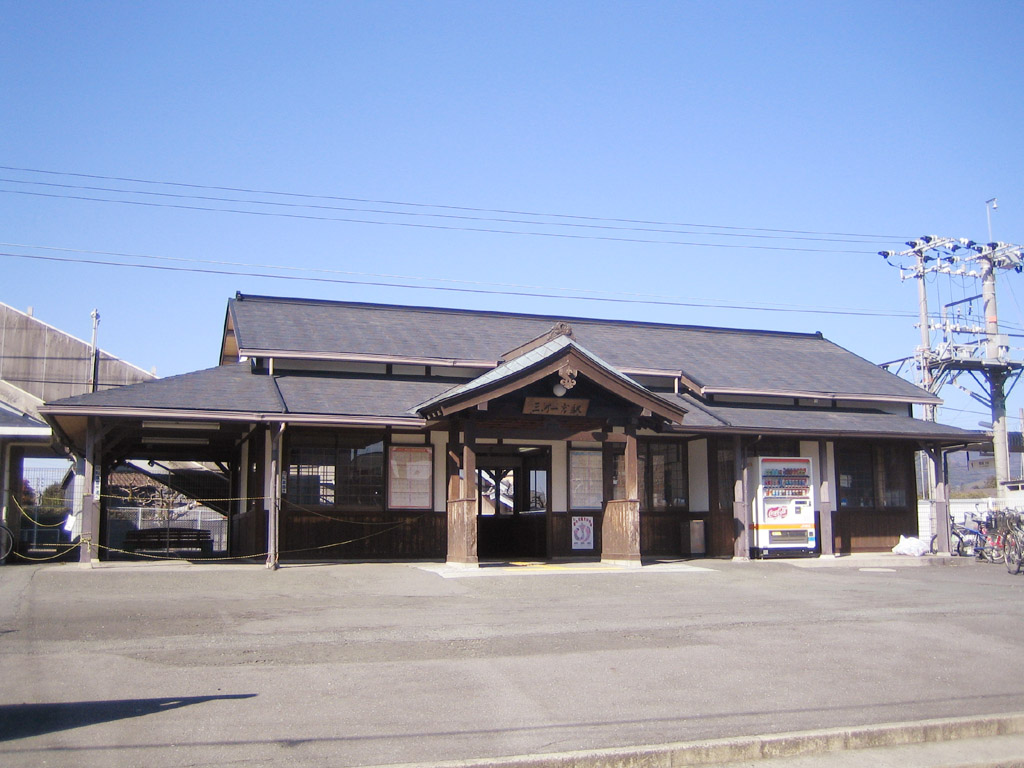
- Mikawa-Ichinomiya Station building, February 2018

General information
- Location: Shimoshinkiri-33 Ichinomiyachō, Toyokawa-shi, Aichi-ken 441-1231; Japan
- Coordinates: 34.8479°N 137.4144°E
- Operator: JR Central
- Line: Iida Line
- Distance: 12.0 kilometers from Toyohashi
- Platforms: 2 side platforms

Other information
- Status: Unstaffed
- Station code: CD

History
- Opened: July 22, 1897
- Former names: Ichinomiya (to 1916)

Passengers
- FY2017: 745 daily
Location
- Location within Aichi Prefecture Location within Japan

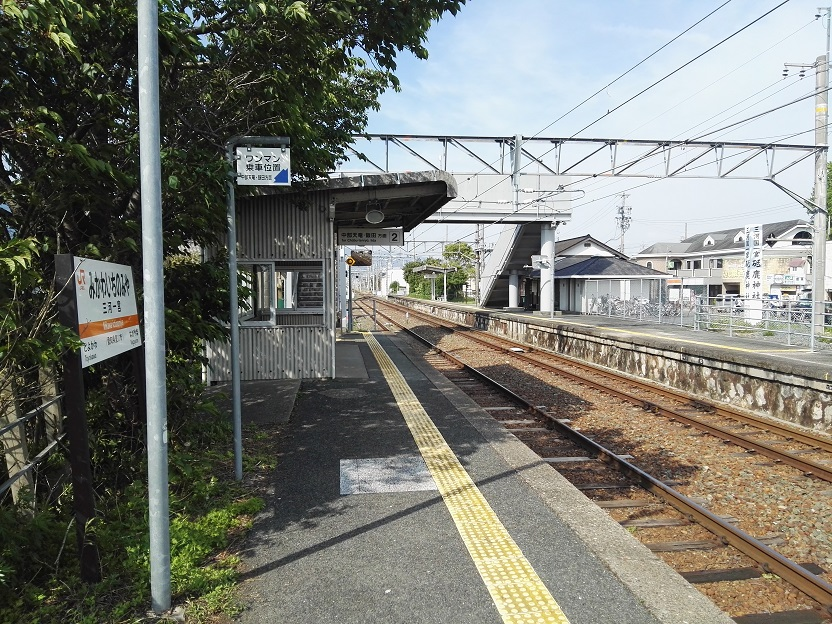
Platform

Mikawa-Ichinomiya Station (三河一宮駅, Mikawa-Ichinomiya-eki) is a railway station in the city of Toyokawa, Aichi Prefecture, Japan, operated by Central Japan Railway Company (JR Tōkai).

== Lines ==
Mikawa-Ichinomiya Station is served by the Iida Line, and is located 12.0 kilometers from the southern terminus of the line at Toyohashi Station.

== Station layout ==
The station has two opposed side platforms connected by a footbridge. The station building is unattended. The station building is designed to resemble a shrine or temple building, as the station is the closest railway station to the ichinomiya of former Mikawa Province, the Toga Shrine.

=== Platforms ===
| 1 | ■ Iida Line | For Toyohashi |
| 2 | ■ Iida Line | For Toyokawa, Iida |

== Adjacent stations ==
| « | Service | » |
Central Japan Railway Company
Iida Line
Limited Express "Inaji" (特急「伊那路」): Does not stop at this station
| Toyokawa | Local (普通) | Nagayama |

== Station history ==
Mikawa-Ichinomiya Station was established on July 22, 1897 as Ichinomiya Station (一の宮駅, Ichinomiya-eki)on the now-defunct Toyokawa Railway (豊川鉄道, Toyokawa Tetsudō). The station was renamed to its present name on January 1, 1916. On August 1, 1943, the Toyokawa Railway was nationalized along with some other local lines to form the Japanese Government Railways (JGR) Iida Line. Scheduled freight operations were discontinued in 1971. Along with its division and privatization of JNR on April 1, 1987, the station came under the control and operation of the Central Japan Railway Company (JR Tōkai). A new station building was completed in December 1990.

== Passenger statistics ==
In fiscal 2017, the station was used by an average of 745 passengers daily.

== Surrounding area ==
- Toga Shrine
- Ichinomiya Seibu Elementary School

== See also ==
- List of railway stations in Japan
