= Shimoji Station =

Railway station in Toyohashi, Aichi Prefecture, Japan

CD02 Shimoji Station 下地駅
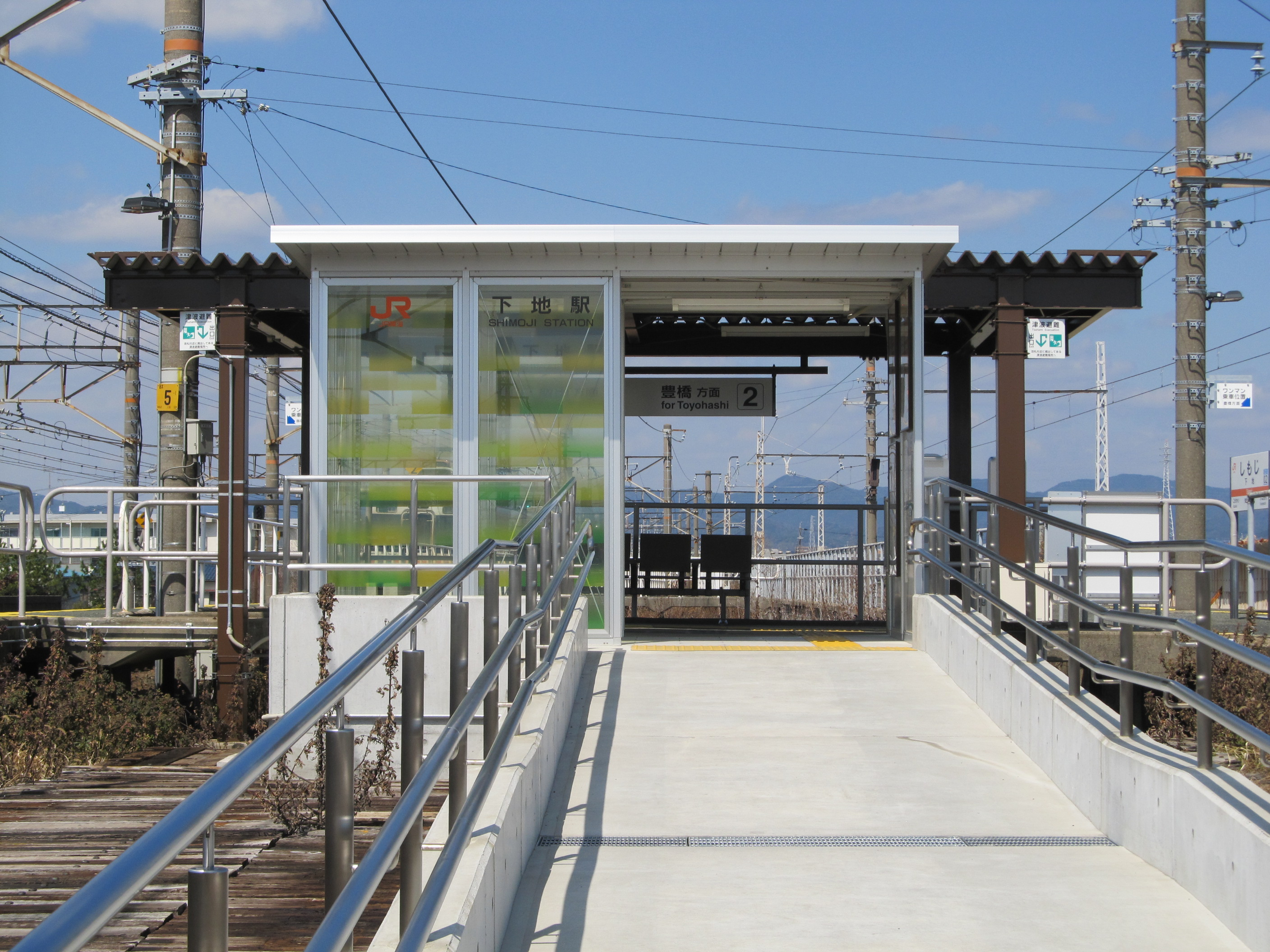
- Shimoji Station, March 2025

General information
- Location: Ushiroguchi Yokosukacho, Toyohashi-shi, Aichi-ken 440-0093; Japan
- Coordinates: 34.7810°N 137.3705°E
- Operator: JR Central
- Line: Iida Line
- Distance: 2.2 kilometers from Toyohashi
- Platforms: 2 side platforms

Other information
- Status: Unstaffed
- Station code: CD02

History
- Opened: August 1, 1943

Passengers
- FY2017: 194 daily
Location
- Location within Aichi Prefecture Location within Japan

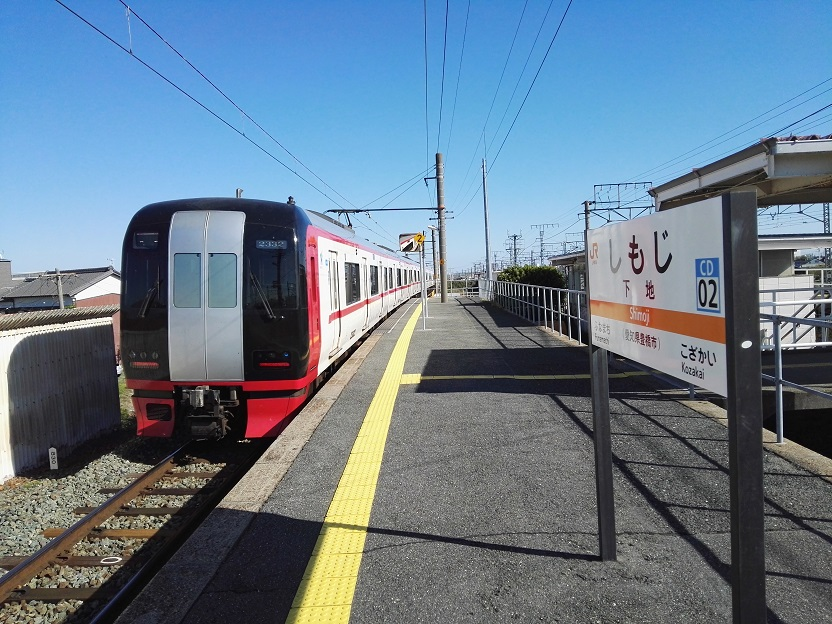
Platform

Shimoji Station (下地駅, Shimoji-eki) is a railway station in the city of Toyohashi, Aichi Prefecture, Japan, operated by Central Japan Railway Company (JR Tōkai).

== Lines ==
Shimoji Station is served by the Iida Line, and is located 2.2 kilometers from the southern terminus of the line at Toyohashi Station.

== Station layout ==
The station has two side platforms built on an embankment, connected by an underpass crossing. The area in between the side platforms is filled in, forming what is effectively an island platform. The station building has automated ticket machines, TOICA automated turnstiles and is unattended.

=== Platforms ===
1	■ Iida Line	For Toyokawa and Iida
2	■ Iida Line	For Toyohashi

== Adjacent stations ==
«	Service	»
Iida Line
Meitetsu train (Sharing tracks with Ilda Line): Does not stop at this station
Limited Express Inaji): Does not stop at this station
Funamachi	Local	Kozakai

== Station history ==
Shimoji Station was established on December 23, 1925 as a temporary stop on the now-defunct Toyokawa Railway (豊川鉄道, Toyokawa Tetsudō) connecting Toyohashi with Toyokawa. On August 1, 1943, the Toyokawa Railway was nationalized along with some other local lines to form the Japanese Government Railways (JGR) Iida Line and Shimoji became a full station at that time. The current station building was constructed in 1974. The station has been unattended since April 1985. Along with its division and privatization of JNR on April 1, 1987, the station came under the control and operation of the Central Japan Railway Company.

Station numbering was introduced to the Iida Line in March 2018; Shimoji Station was assigned station number CE02.

== Passenger statistics ==
In fiscal 2017, the station was used by an average of 194 passengers daily.

== Surrounding area ==
- Toyokawa River
- Japan National Route 1

== See also ==
- List of railway stations in Japan
