= Toga Shrine =

Shinto shrine in Toyokawa, Aichi prefecture, Japan

Toga Shrine 砥鹿神社
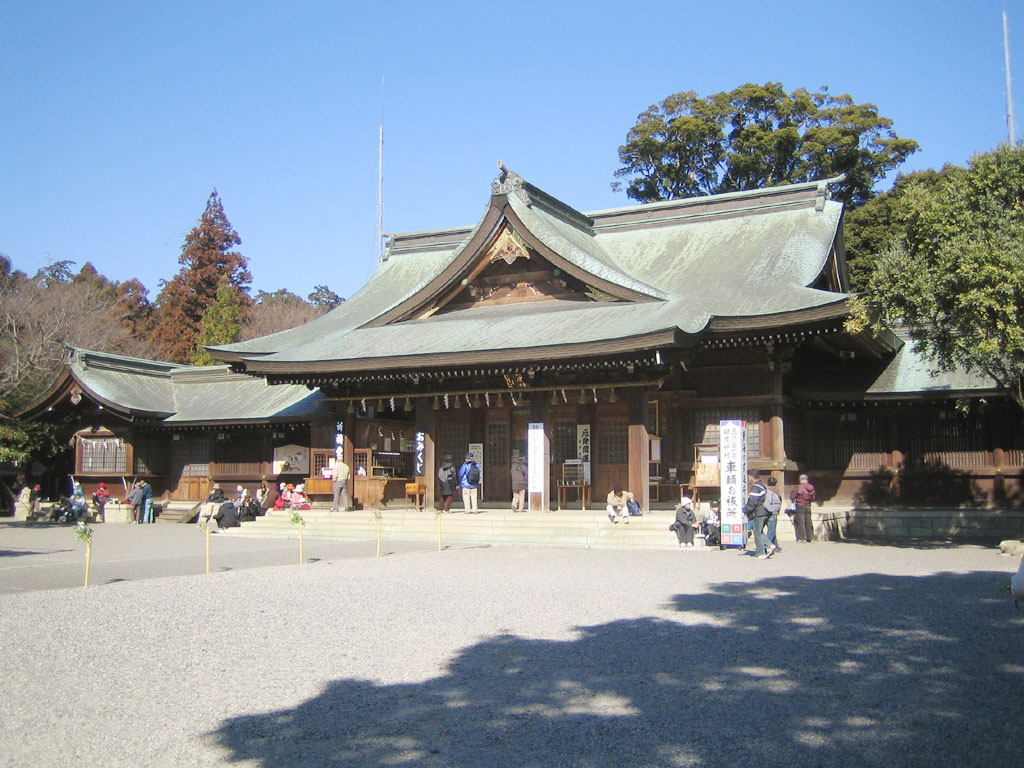
- Honden of Toga Shrine

- Toga Shrine Toga Shrine (Japan)

Religion
- Affiliation: Shinto
- Deity: Ōkuninushi no mikoto
- Festival: May 3–5

Location
- Location: Nishigakiuchi, Ichinomiya-cho, Toyokawa-shi, Aichi
- Interactive map of Toga Shrine 砥鹿神社
- Coordinates: 34°50′51.59″N 137°25′16.38″E

Architecture
- Established: Taihō period (701-704 AD)

Website
- www.togajinja.or.jp

Toga Shrine (砥鹿神社, Toga Jinja) is a Shinto shrine in the city of Toyokawa in eastern Aichi Prefecture, Japan. It is the ichinomiya of former Mikawa Province. The main festival of the shrine is held annually from May 3 to May 5. Located on the borderland of Aichi with Shizuoka Prefecture, the summit of Mount Hongū 782 metres (2,566 ft) is a sacred mountain considered to be within the precincts of the shrine, and has a subsidiary chapel.

== Enshrined kami ==
The kami enshrined at Toga Shrine is:

- Ōkuninushi (玉埼神, Ōkuninushi-no-mikoto) the god of nation-building, agriculture, medicine, and protective magic.

== History ==
The origins of Toga Shrine are unknown. The shrine claims to have been founded in the Taihō period (701-704 AD) by Emperor Mommu. It is located in an area of eastern Mikawa with a favorable climate, which has been settled since at least the Jōmon period. One of the treasures of the shrine is a Yayoi period dōtaku bronze ritual object, possibly recovered from a burial mound in the area. The shrine first appears in historical documentation in the early Heian period Nihon Montoku Tennō Jitsuroku in an entry dated 850 and subsequently in the Nihon Sandai Jitsuroku in an entry dated 864. The shrine is mentioned as the ichinomiya of Mikawa Province in the 927 Engishiki records. During the Sengoku period, it was battleground between the forces of Tokugawa Ieyasu and the imagawa clan. It was given a small stipend of 100 koku by the Edo period Tokugawa shogunate. With the establishment of State Shinto after the Meiji restoration, the Toga Shrine was designated as a National Shrine, 3rd rank (国幣小社}, Kokuhei Shōsha). in the modern system of ranked Shinto Shrines.

The shrine is a five-minute walk from Mikawa-Ichinomiya Station on the JR East Iida Line

== Cultural Properties ==
=== Aichi Prefecture Designated Tangible Cultural Properties ===
- Tamo Dōtaku (田峯の銅鐸), Yayoi period;

== Gallery ==
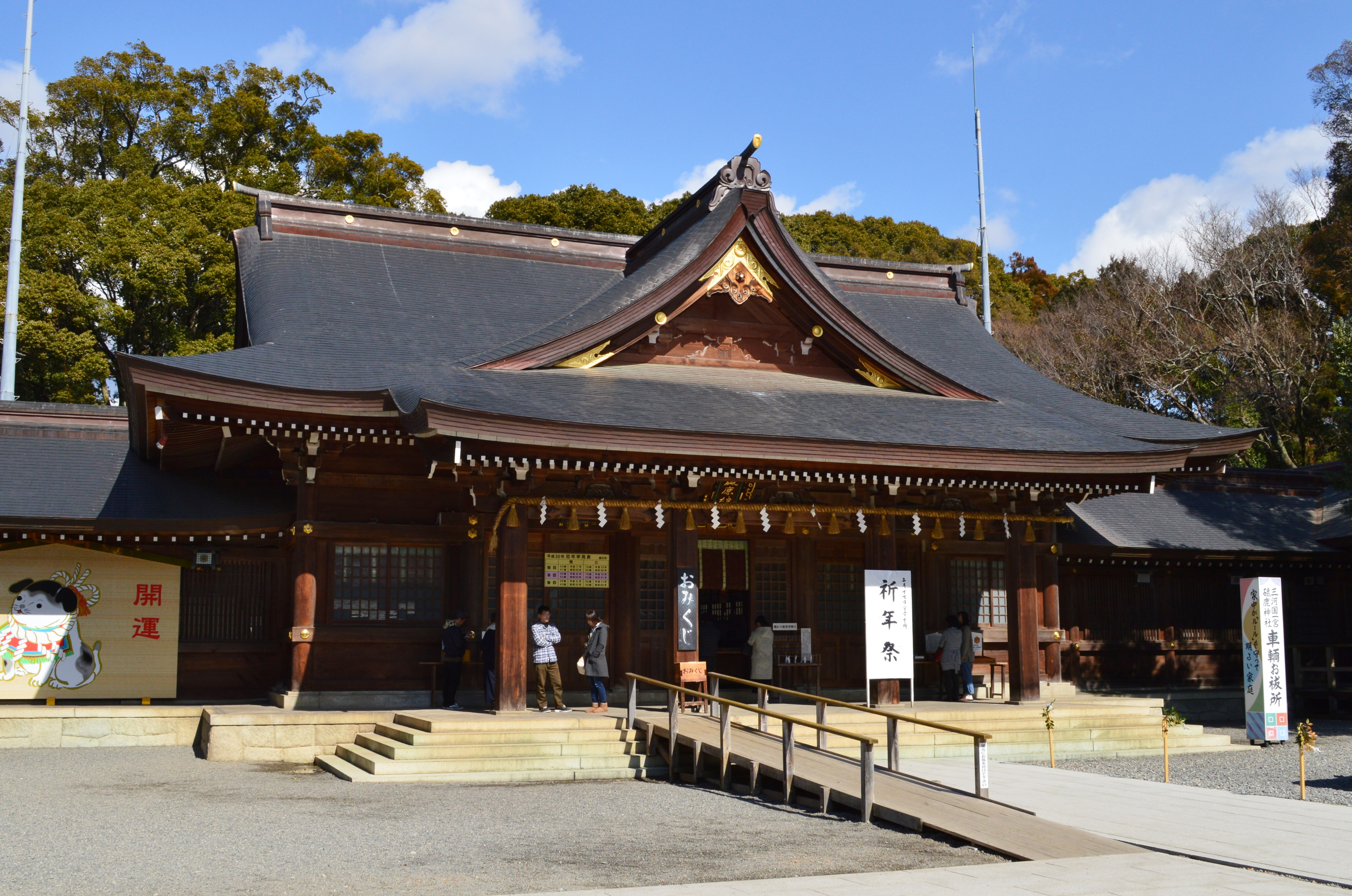
Haiden

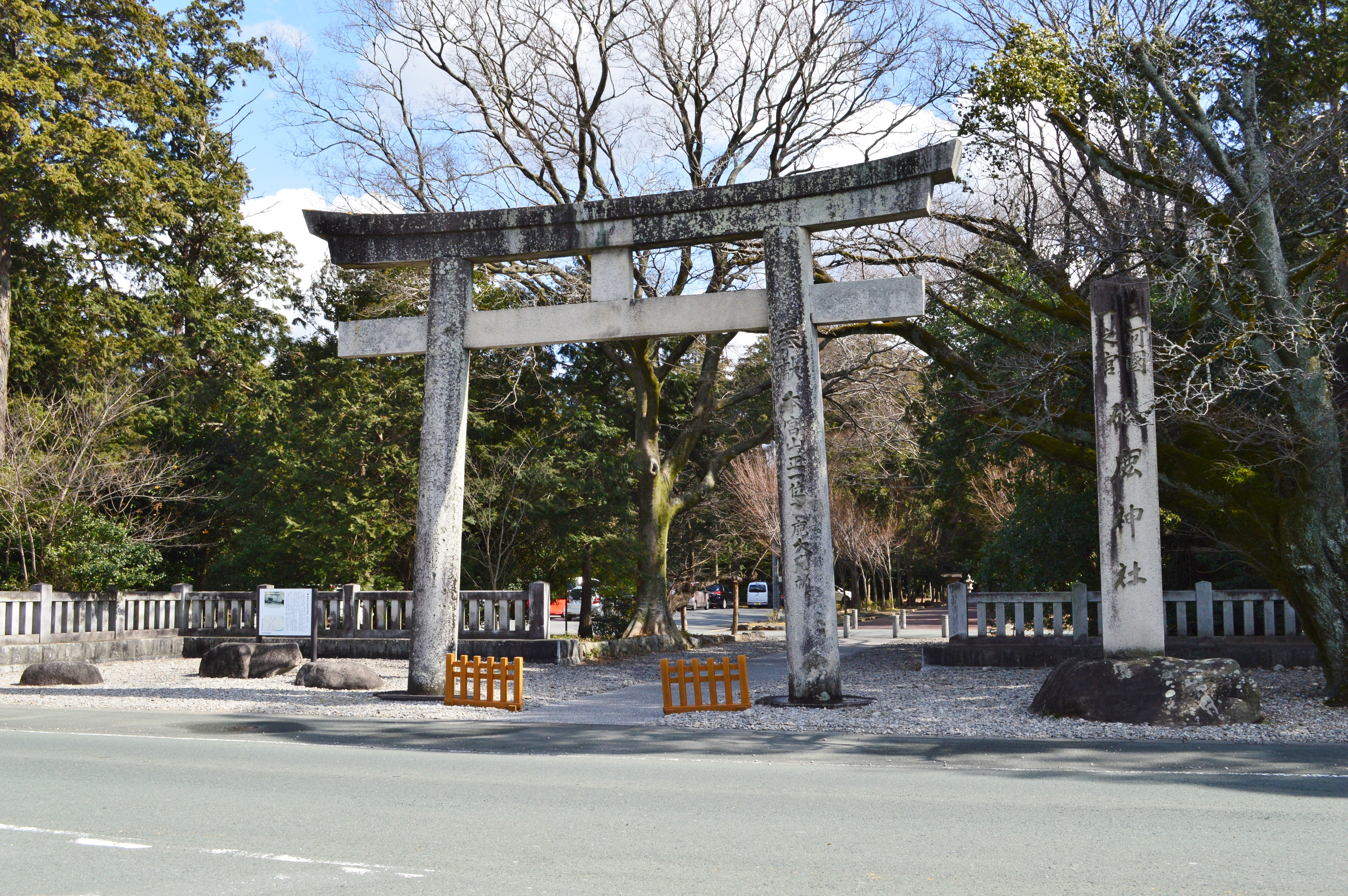
Torii

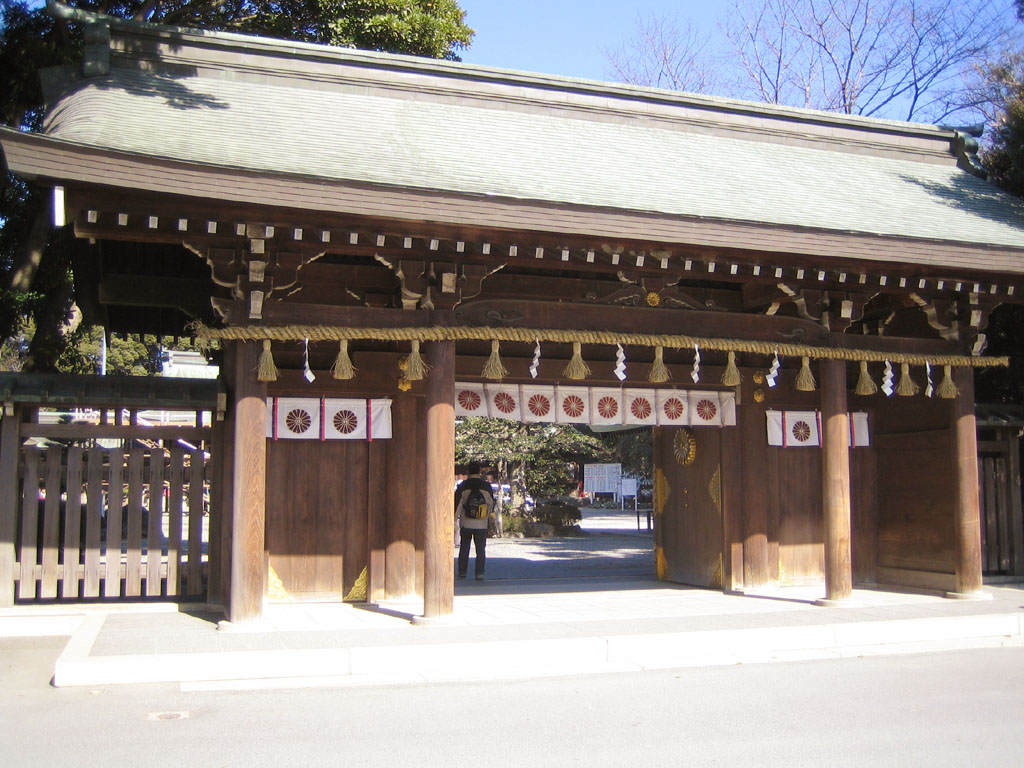
Main gate

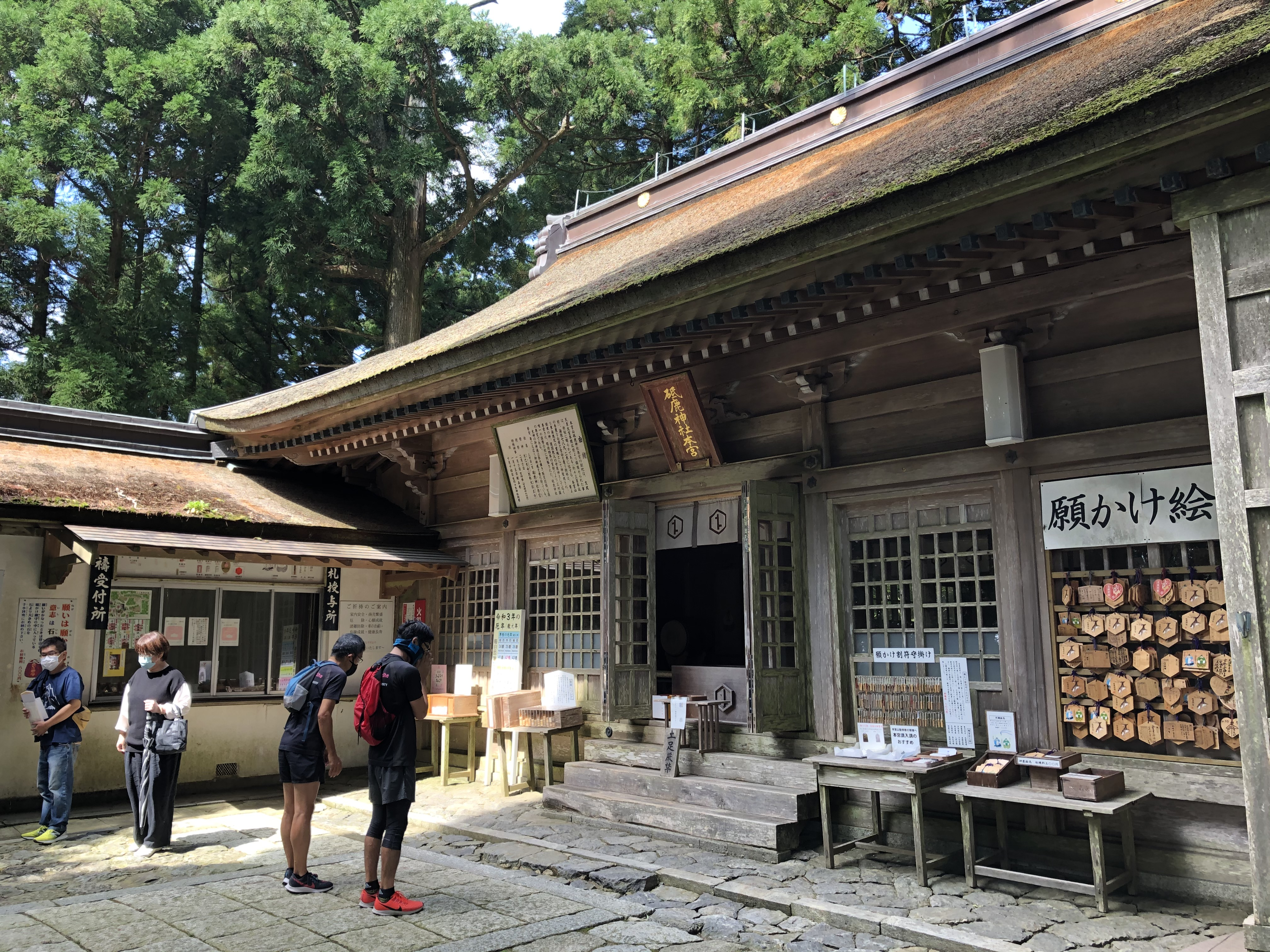
Oku-no-miya on Mount Hongu

== See also ==
- List of Shinto shrines
- Ichinomiya
