= Kozakai Station =

Railway station in Toyokawa, Aichi Prefecture, Japan

CD03 Kozakai Station 小坂井駅
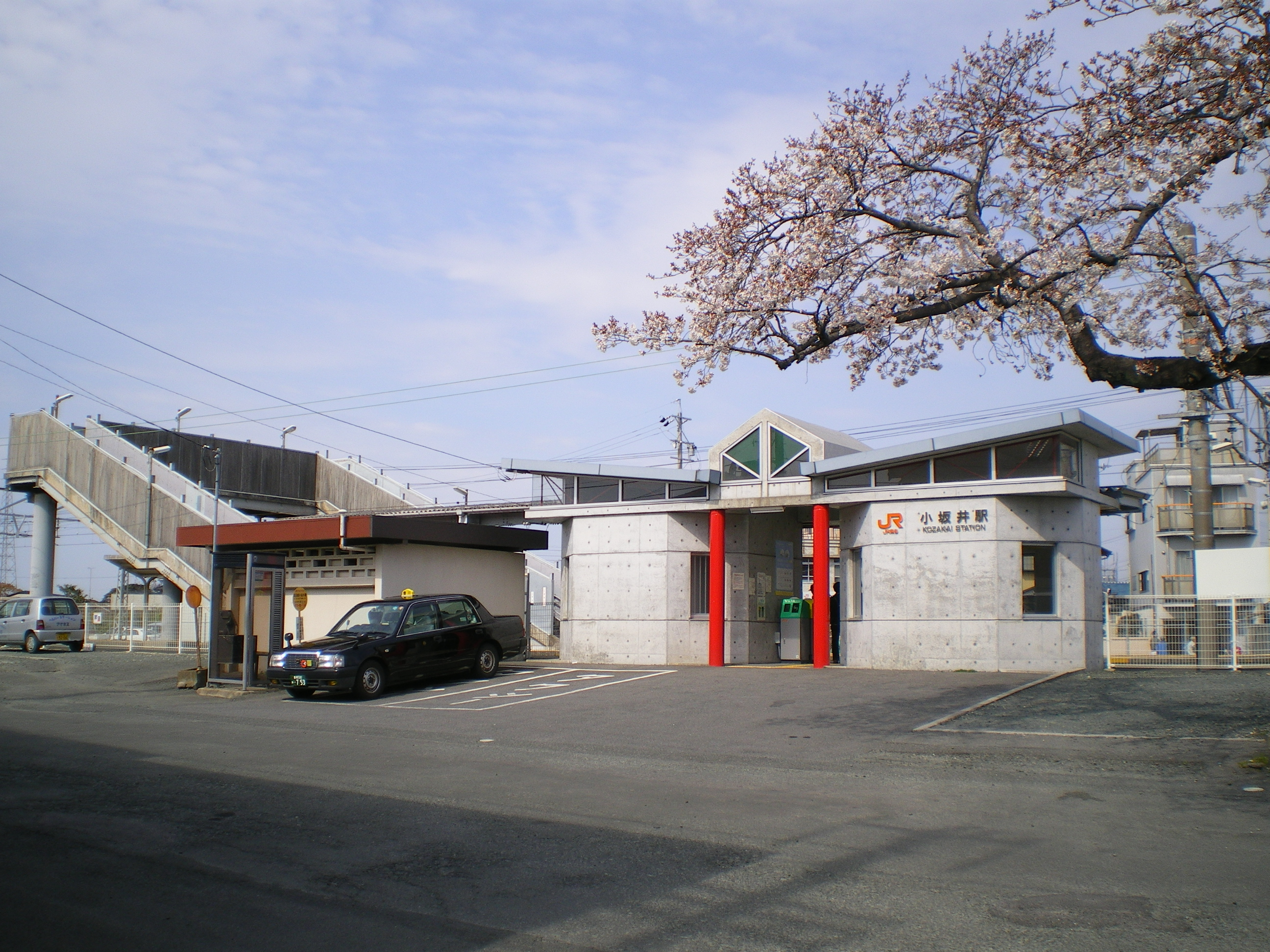
- Kozakai Station in February 2019

General information
- Location: Kurayashiki-72 Kozakai, Toyokawa-shi, Aichi-ken 441-0103; Japan
- Coordinates: 34.7974°N 137.3629°E
- Operator: JR Central
- Line: Iida Line
- Distance: 4.4 kilometers from Toyohashi
- Platforms: 2 side platforms

Other information
- Status: Unstaffed
- Station code: CD03

History
- Opened: March 13, 1898

Passengers
- FY2017: 443 daily
Location
- Location within Aichi Prefecture Location within Japan

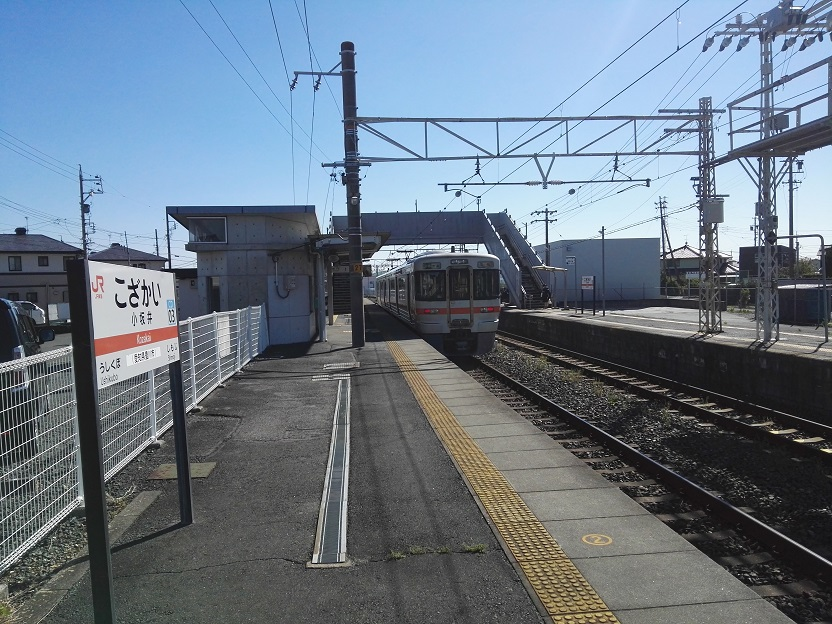
Platform

Kozakai Station (小坂井駅, Kozakai-eki) is a railway station in the city of Toyokawa, Aichi Prefecture, Japan, operated by Central Japan Railway Company (JR Tōkai).

== Lines ==
Kozakai Station is served by the Iida Line, and is located 4.4 kilometers from the southern terminus of the line at Toyohashi Station.

== Station layout ==
The station has two opposed side platforms connected by a footbridge. The station building has automated ticket machines, TOICA automated turnstiles and is unattended.

=== Platforms ===
| 1 | ■ Iida Line | For Toyohashi |
| 2 | ■ Iida Line | For Toyokawa, Iida |

== Adjacent stations ==
| « | Service | » |
Central Japan Railway Company
Iida Line
Limited Express "Inaji" (特急「伊那路」): Does not stop at this station
| Shimoji | Local (普通) | Ushikubo |

== Station history ==
Kozakai Station was established on March 13, 1898 as a station on the now-defunct Toyokawa Railway (豊川鉄道, Toyokawa Tetsudō) connecting Toyohashi with Toyokawa. On April 1, 1926, the Aichi Electric Railroad (愛知電気鉄道, Aichi Denki Tetsudo) (later part of Meitetsu also began operations to this station. On August 1, 1943, the Toyokawa Railway was nationalized along with some other local lines to form the Japanese Government Railways (JGR) Iida Line. Meitetsu ceased operations to Kozakai in 1954. Scheduled freight operations were discontinued in 1971. Along with its division and privatization of JNR on April 1, 1987, the station came under the control and operation of the Central Japan Railway Company (JR Tōkai). A new station building was completed in February 2002.

Station numbering was introduced to the Iida Line in March 2018; Kozakai Station was assigned station number CE03.

== Passenger statistics ==
In fiscal 2017, the station was used by an average of 443 passengers daily.

== Surrounding area ==
- Kozakai High School
- Kozakai Higashi Junior High School

== See also ==
- List of railway stations in Japan
