= JGSDF Camp Toyokawa =

Military base in Aichi Prefecture, Japan

- 豊川駐屯地
- Toyokawa, Aichi in Japan
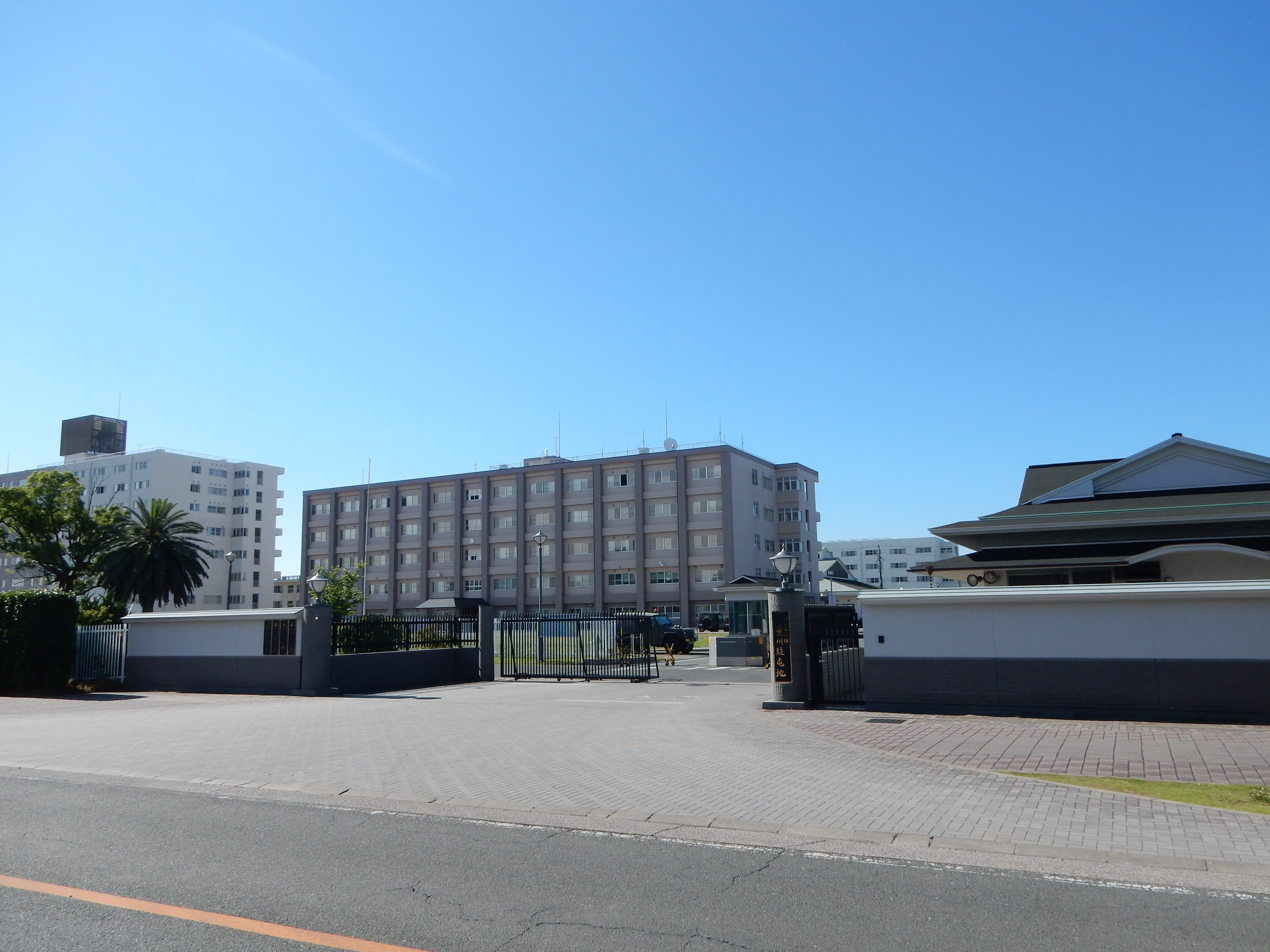

Site information
- Type: Military Base
- Controlled by: Japan Ground Self-Defense Force

Location
- Coordinates: 34.831°N 137.381°E

Site history
- Built: 1950

JGSDF Camp Toyokawa (豊川駐屯地, Toyokawa-chūtonchi) is a military base of the Japan Ground Self-Defense Force, located in Toyokawa, Aichi prefecture, Japan. It is one of several military facilities located in the foothills of eastern Aichi Prefecture.

== History ==
Camp Toyokawa was established in December 1950 as a training facility under the Japanese National Police Reserve, a paramilitary force which later formed the basis of the modern Japan Ground Self-Defense Force.

From March 1960, it became the garrison for the JGSDF 10th Artillery Regiment. The 10th Anti-Aircraft Artillery Regiment under the JGSDF 10th Infantry Division was established in March 1991. With the reorganization of the 10th Infantry Division in March 2004, the JGSDF 49th Infantry Regiment was created.

Units from Camp Toyokawa have been active in various disaster relief efforts in Japan, as well as United Nations operations in Cambodia and Iraq.

== Organization ==
- JGSDF 10th Artillery Regiment
- JGSDF 49th Infantry Regiment
- JGSDF 10th Anti-Aircraft Artillery Battalion
