= Mount Hongū (Aichi) =

Mountain in Aichi Prefecture, Japan

Coordinates: 34°54′35″N 137°25′14″E

- 本宮山
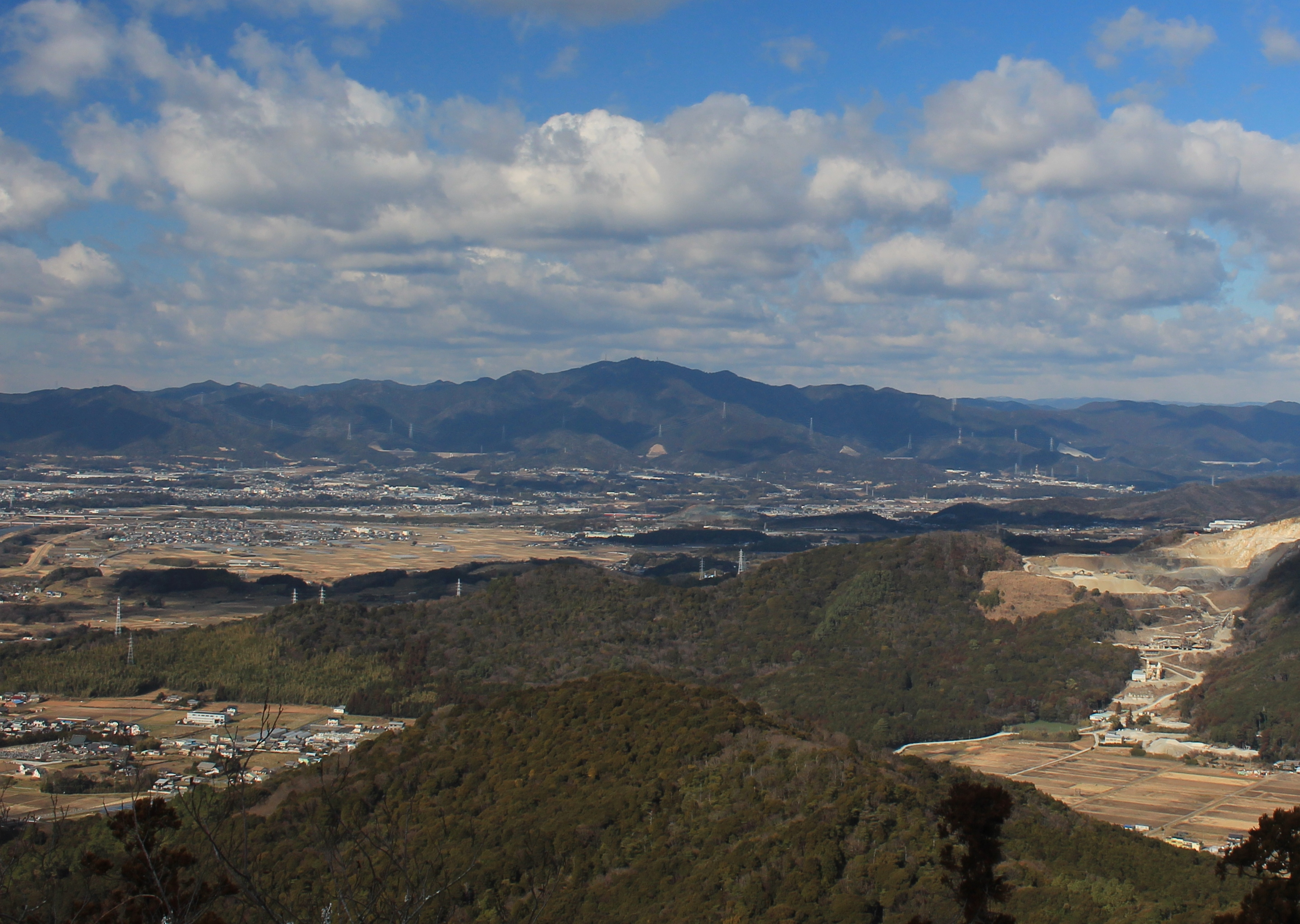
- Mount Hongū seen from Mount Ishimaki

Highest point
- Elevation: 789.2 m (2,589 ft)

Geography
- Location: Toyokawa, Okazaki, Shinshiro in Aichi Prefecture, Japan

Climbing
- Easiest route: by car or hiking

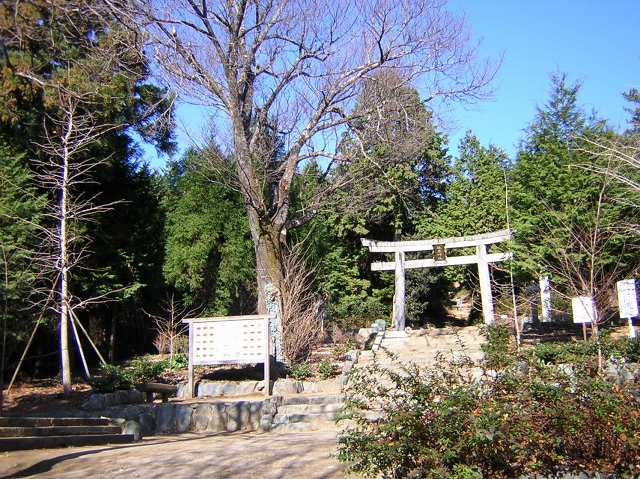
Torii

Mount Hongū (本宮山, Hongū-san) is a mountain located on the border of three cities in Aichi Prefecture, Toyokawa, Okazaki, and Shinshiro.
