= Bombing of Toyokawa in World War II =

Bombing of Toyokawa
- Part of Pacific War, World War II
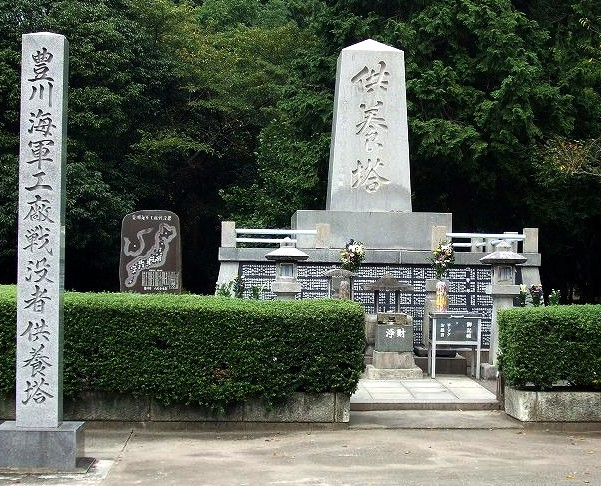
- Memorial to the Toyokawa Air Raid, at Toyokawa Inari
Date	1 November 1944, 7 August 1945
Location	Toyokawa, Aichi, Japan

Belligerents
United States	Japan

Casualties and losses
none	2,544 to 2,677 killed

The bombing of Toyokawa (豊川空襲, Toyokawa dai-kūshū) was part of the strategic bombing campaign waged by the United States of America against military and civilian targets and population centers during the Japan home islands campaign in the closing stages of the Pacific War in 1945.

== Background ==
Although the city of Toyokawa was not a major population center, it had a major target of military significance: the Toyokawa Naval Arsenal (豊川海軍工廠) one of the largest in the Empire of Japan, which produced 7.7 mm machine guns, 13 mm and 20 mm aircraft cannon and 25 mm anti-aircraft cannon and associated munitions for the Imperial Japanese Navy. By February 1945, the facility had 56,400 workers and covered an area of 330 hectares. The Tōkaidō Main Line railway connecting Tokyo with Osaka also ran through the city.

== Air raids ==
Despite its obvious military significance, Toyokawa was not bombed until the very late stages of the war. On 1 November 1944, a small scale air raid occurred. This was followed on 23 November by a midnight fly-over by a lone camera-equipped B-29 Superfortress on a reconnaissance mission.

However, a major air raid did not occur until the morning of 7 August 1945. During this attack, 135 B-29 Superfortress bombers of the USAAF 20th Air Force, 58th 73rd, 313th, and 314th Bombardment Wings launched from Guam, Saipan and Tinian. They were joined by 48 P-51 Mustang escort fighters deployed from Iwo Jima. Arriving over the target area at 10:13 AM, twelve B-29s bombed the Toyokawa Naval Arsenal, while the remaining bombers concentrated on Toyokawa's civilian population center, and the P-51s strafed targets of opportunity. A total of 3,256 500-lb bombs (813 tons) was dropped on the city from an altitude of 15,000–17,000 feet. Civilian casualty estimates range from 2,544 to 2,677 people killed. Victims included 452 schoolchildren and teenaged girls, some of whom had been conscripted and many of whom had volunteered to work at the Naval Arsenal.

Japanese anti-aircraft fire damaged 21 B-29s during the raid, one of which crashed into the ocean near Iwo Jima. There were no American fatalities. Another B-29 lost course and dropped its bombs on the rural village of Futamata (now part of Hamamatsu, Shizuoka).

After the war, a memorial monument was erected within the grounds of Toyokawa Inari temple. Several other memorials exist at various locations around Toyokawa City.

== See also ==
- Evacuations of civilians in Japan during World War II
- Grave of the Fireflies (short story), a semi-autobiographical short story set during the bombing
