= Toyokawa, Aichi =

Toyokawa 豊川市
- City
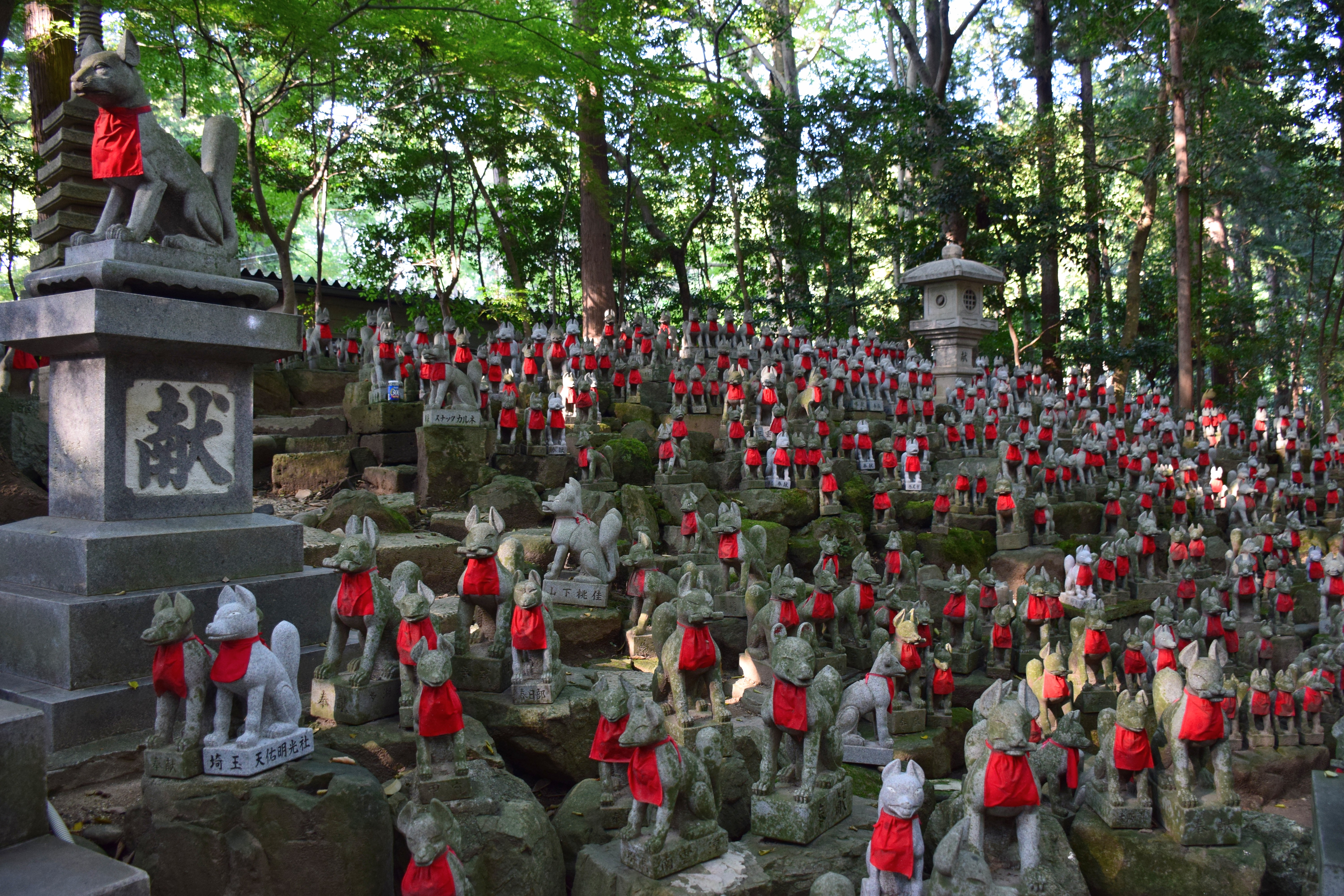
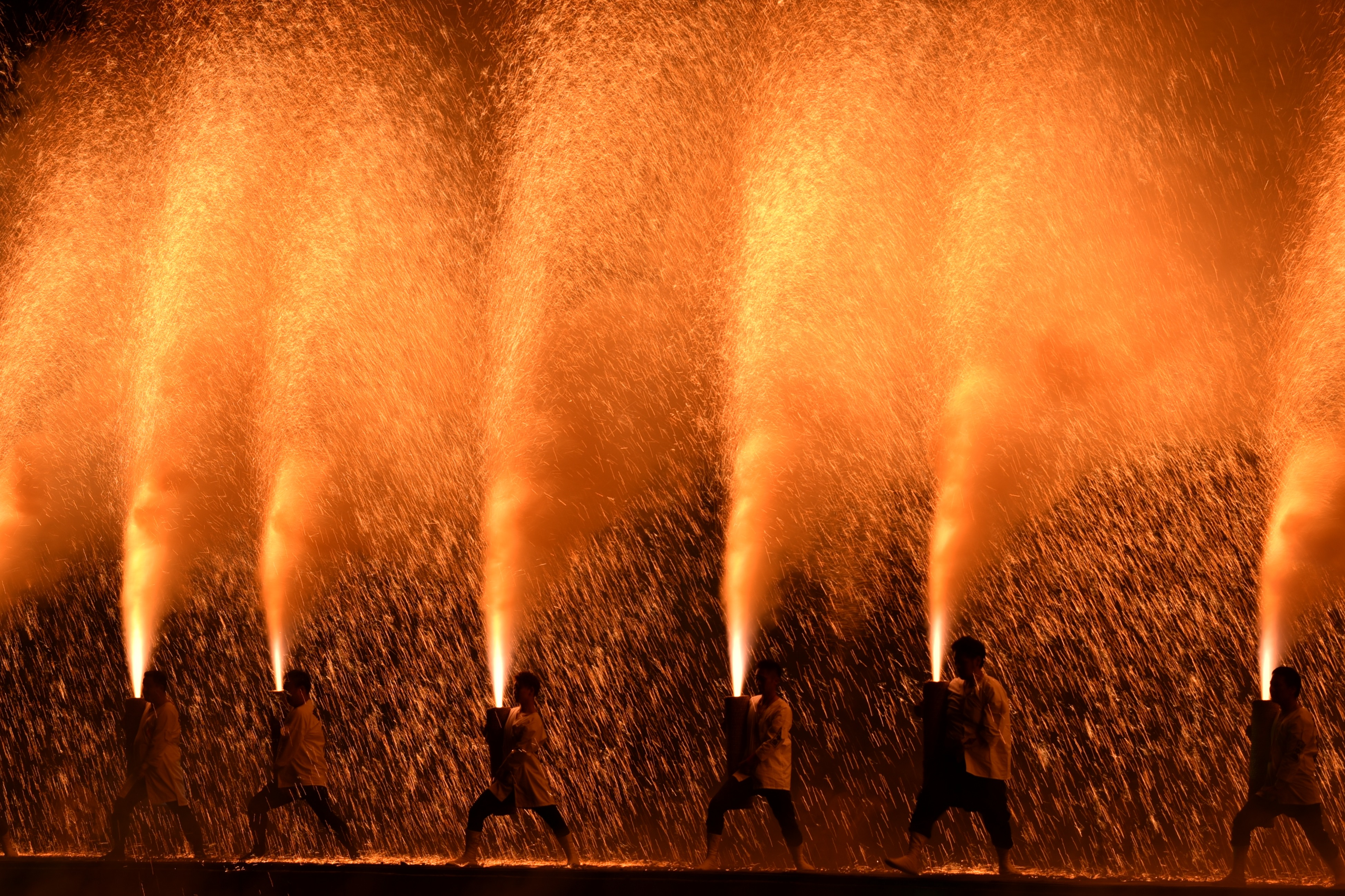
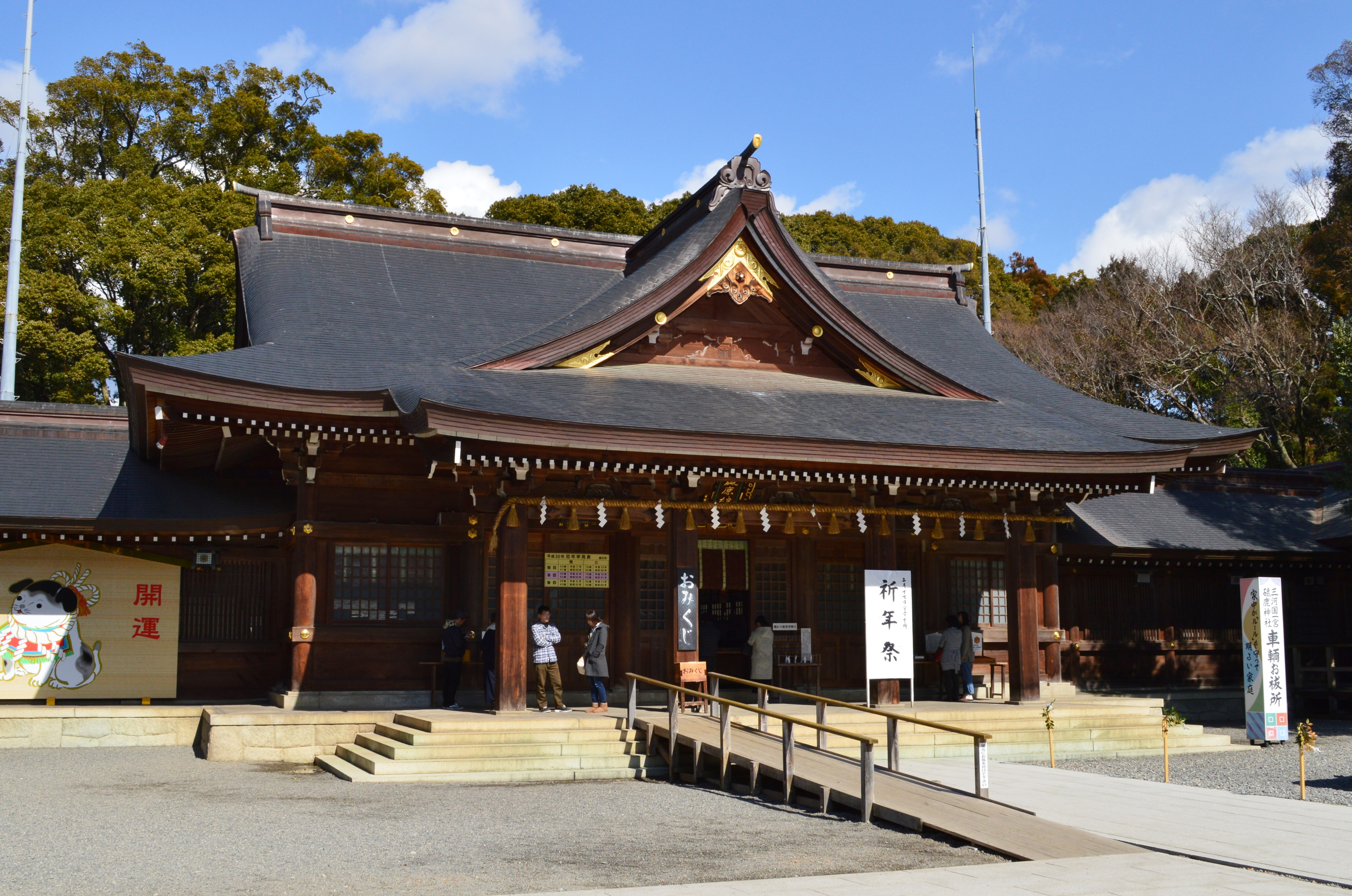
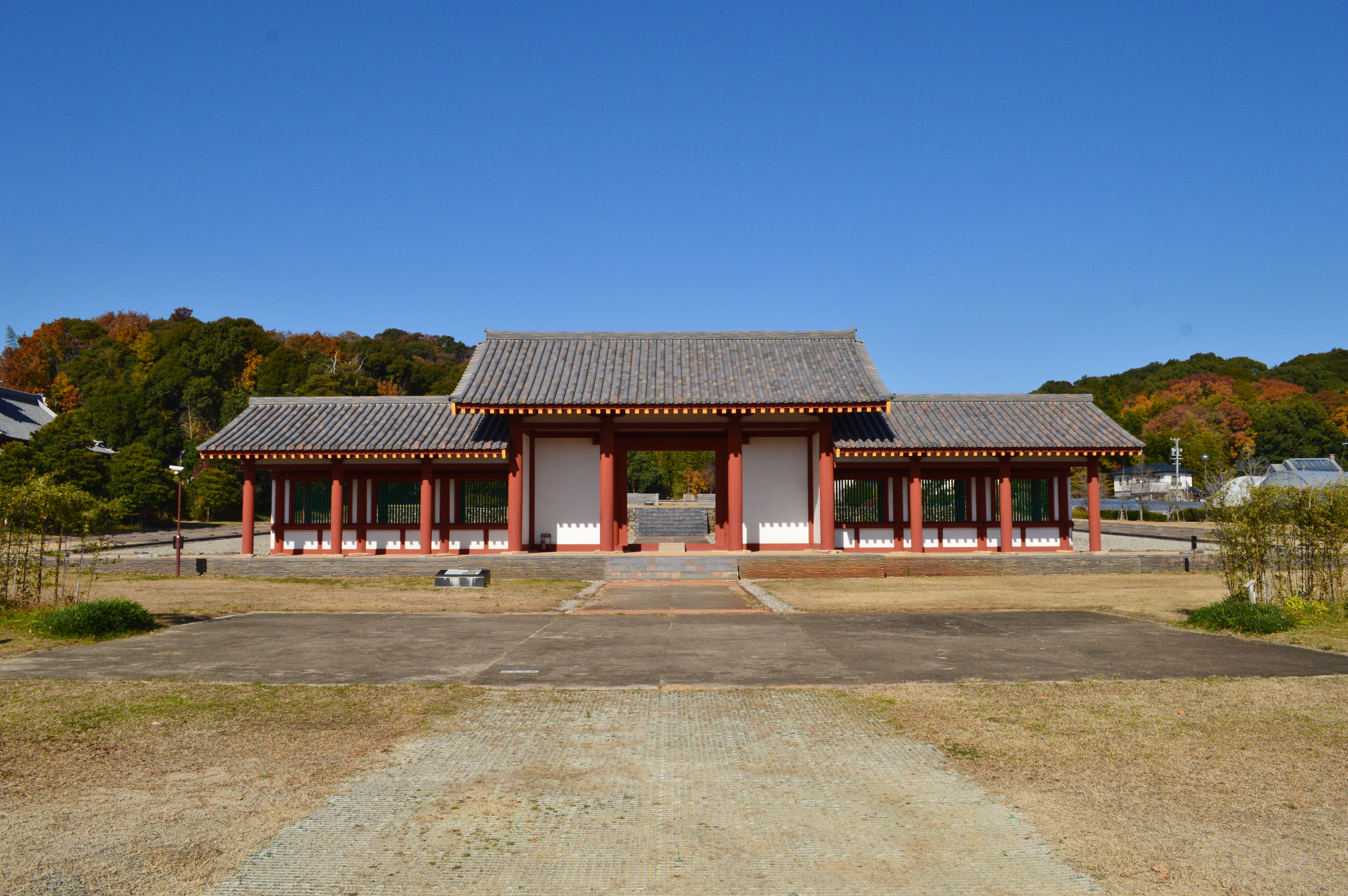
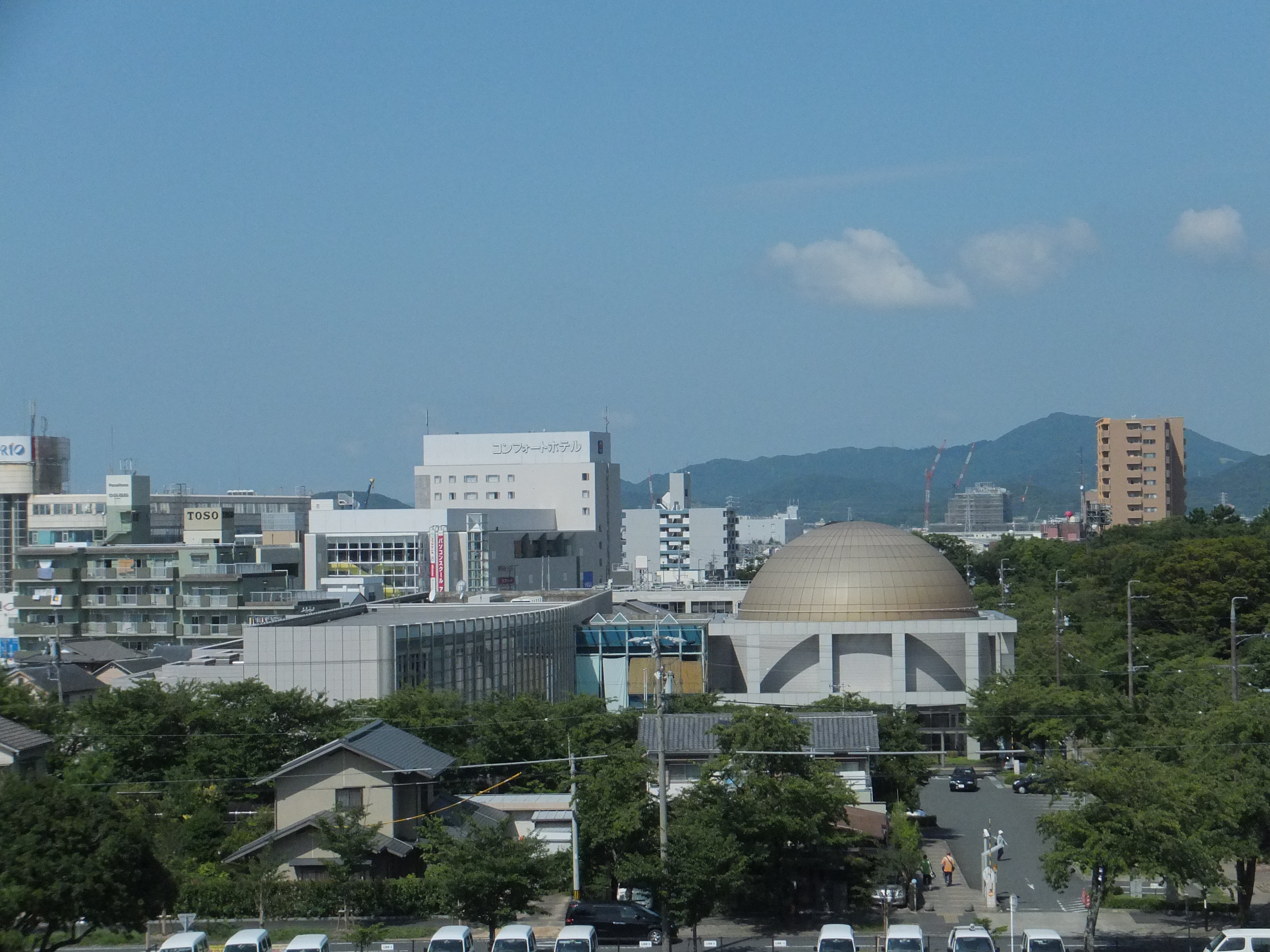
- Toyokawa Inari Tezutsu Fireworks Festival Toga Shrine Mikawa Province Kokufu Toyokawa skyline

- Flag Emblem
- Interactive map outlining Toyokawa
- Location of Toyokawa in Aichi Prefecture

- Location within Japan
- Coordinates: 34°49′36.4″N 137°22′33.3″E
- Country: Japan
- Region: Chūbu (Tōkai)
- Prefecture: Aichi
- First official recorded: 480 AD
- City Settled: June 1, 1943

Government
  - Mayor: Minoru Yamawaki

Area
  - Total: 161.14 km^{2} (62.22 sq mi)

Population (October 1, 2019)
  - Total: 183,930
  - Density: 1,141.4/km^{2} (2,956.3/sq mi)
- Time zone: UTC+9 (Japan Standard Time)
  - Tree: Japanese Black Pine
  - Flower: Dwarf azalea
- Phone number: 0533-89-2111
- Address: 1-1 Suwa-chō, Toyokawa-shi, Aichi-ken 442-0068
- Website: Official website

Toyokawa (豊川市, Toyokawa-shi; Japanese pronunciation: [tò̞.jó̞.kä̀.β̞ä̀, -kä́.β̞ä́.ɕì]) is a city in the eastern part of Aichi Prefecture, Japan. As of 1 October 2019, the city had an estimated population of 183,930 in 72,949 households, and a population density of 1,141 persons per km^{2}. The total area of the city is 161.14 square kilometres (62.22 sq mi). Toyokawa, famous for its Toyokawa Inari temple, has a good balance of industry, commerce, agriculture and forestry, and is situated in an area rich in history, traditions, and culture.

== Geography ==
Located in the eastern part of Aichi Prefecture, the city has the Toyogawa River to the east, the Otoha River to the west, and the Sana River in the central area, flowing into Mikawa Bay in the southwest. The northern part of the city is predominantly mountainous, featuring numerous golf courses.

The city is divided into three districts covering 122.4 hectares in the central business area: the Suwa District, where public institutions and commercial facilities are located, the Toyogawa District, which developed as the gateway town to Toyogawa Inari Shrine, and the Chuo-dori District, connecting both areas. The city has implemented the "Basic Plan for Revitalization of the Central Business District," aiming to promote development in the central business district [4].

However, due to the merger of four villages that originally formed independent central areas, the city struggled to form a centralized urban center. Despite the expansive nature of the city's urban areas, the central functions are dispersed among several stations in different districts. Notably, Toyokawa Station, despite its name, does not function as the central station, further complicating the formation of a centralized business district. Consequently, large-scale commercial facilities and urban development lagged behind, leading to a prolonged situation where the purchasing population flowed to neighboring cities.

Entering the Heisei era, efforts were made to open medium-sized commercial facilities in the Suwa District and its vicinity. Simultaneously, roadside stores concentrated around Toyokawa IC and the southern part of Nagadoshi, near the border with Toyohashi City, without a clear shift in the decentralization trend.

Major roads, such as National Route 1 to the west, National Route 23 to the southwest, and National Route 151 from the east to the south, traverse the city. Additionally, the Hime Kaido (Hon-Zaka Street) runs east to west within the city. There are four railway lines, roughly parallel to the main roads.

In spring, cherry blossoms bloom along the Sana River, Otoha River, and in the Sakura Tunnel near the city hall, adding color to the streets. The summer season sees various festivals throughout the city, creating a lively atmosphere. The city enjoys a relatively mild climate, with little to no snowfall even in winter.

=== Climate ===
The city has a climate characterized by hot and humid summers, and relatively mild winters (Köppen climate classification Cfa). The average annual temperature in Toyokawa is 15.8 °C. The average annual rainfall is 1751 mm with September as the wettest month. The temperatures are highest on average in August, at around 27.5 °C, and lowest in January, at around 4.8 °C.

=== Demographics ===
Per Japanese census data, the population of Toyokawa has been increasing over the past 60 years.

Historical population
Year	Pop.	±%
1950	98,332	—
1960	105,590	+7.4%
1970	130,997	+24.1%
1980	157,084	+19.9%
1990	168,796	+7.5%
2000	176,698	+4.7%
2010	181,882	+2.9%

=== Surrounding municipalities ===
Aichi Prefecture

- Gamagōri
- Okazaki
- Shinshiro
- Toyohashi

== History ==
=== Origins ===
The area of modern Toyokawa was settled in prehistoric times. During the Nara period, the kokubunji of Mikawa Province was established in 741.

=== Feudal period ===
==== Muromachi period ====
The temple of Toyokawa Inari, a popular pilgrimage destination, dates from 1441.

==== Sengoku period ====
A number of daimyō clans under the Tokugawa shogunate originate in what are now parts of Toyokawa, most notably the Makino clan.

=== Early modern period ===
==== Edo period ====
The area prospered during the Edo period with two post towns along the Tōkaidō, Goyu-shuku and Akasaka.

=== Late modern period ===
==== Meiji period ====
After the Meiji Restoration, on October 1, 1889, several villages were organized with the establishment of the modern municipalities system within Hoi District, Aichi Prefecture, including Toyokawa Village. On March 13, 1893, Toyokawa was promoted to town status.

==== Showa period ====
Toyokawa City was founded on June 1, 1943, by the merger of Toyokawa town with neighboring Ushikubo Town and Yawata Village, all from Hoi District.

In 1939 the massive Toyokawa Naval Arsenal was established, one of the largest producers of machine guns, aviation ordnance and ammunition in the Empire of Japan. It also had sections that produced military-issue katana, bayonets, and glass lenses for use in cameras, binoculars, and similar equipment. During World War II, many thousands of civilians were conscripted or volunteered to work at the Arsenal, and towards the end of the war, this workforce included hundreds of middle school students and high school girls. On August 7, 1945, the Toyokawa Naval Arsenal was targeted by a flight of B-29 bombers. About 2,500 people were killed during the Toyokawa Air Raid.

Toyokawa was one of the last places to be targeted using conventional explosive and incendiary bombs in the closing days of World War II, occurring the day after Hiroshima was destroyed by an atomic bomb.

=== Contemporary history ===
==== After WWII ====
After the war, on April 12, 1955, Toyokawa annexed Mikami village from Yana District. This was followed by the neighboring town of Goyu from Hoi District on April 1, 1959. Toyokawa further expanded on February 1, 2006, by annexing Ichinomiya, On January 15, 2008, the towns of Otowa and Mito became part of Toyokawa, and finally on February 1, 2010, the town of Kozakai likewise was merged into Toyokawa City.

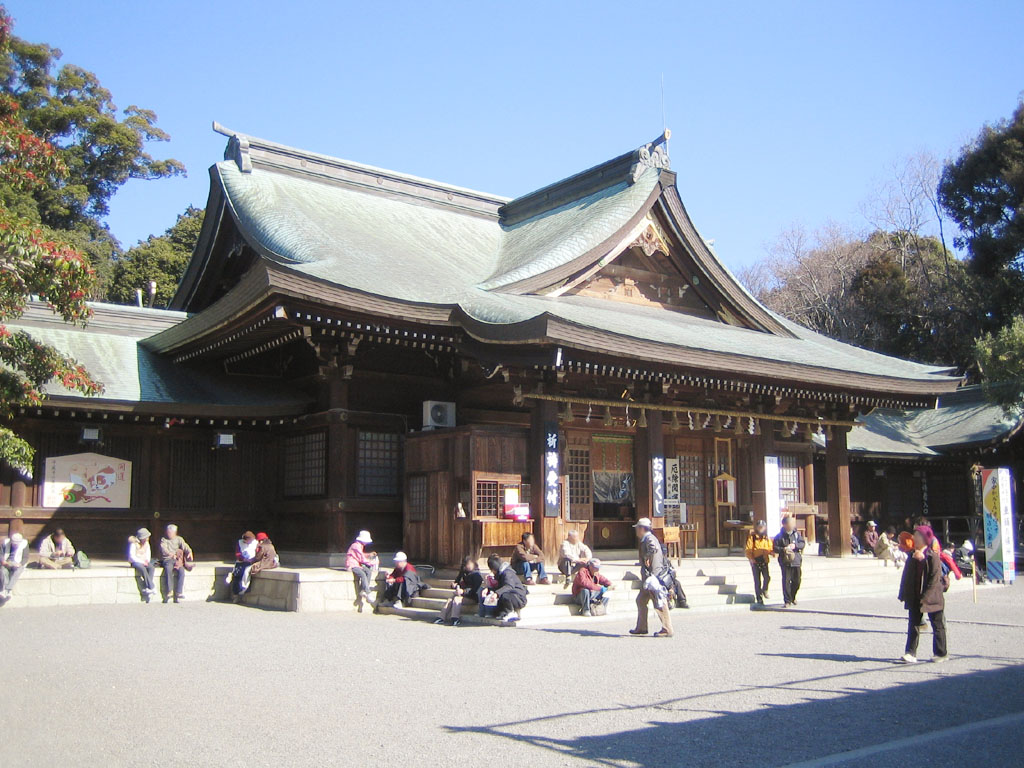
Toga Shrine

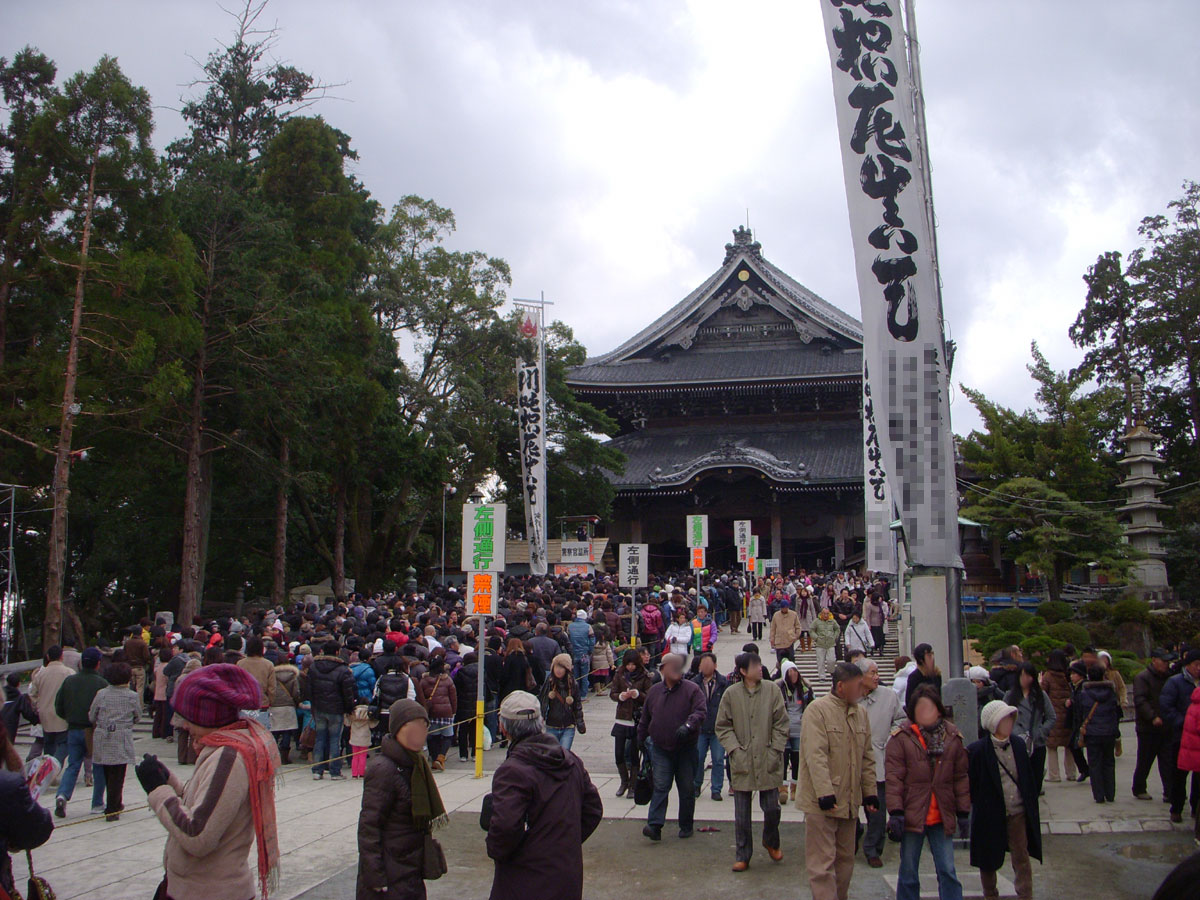
Toyokawa Inari

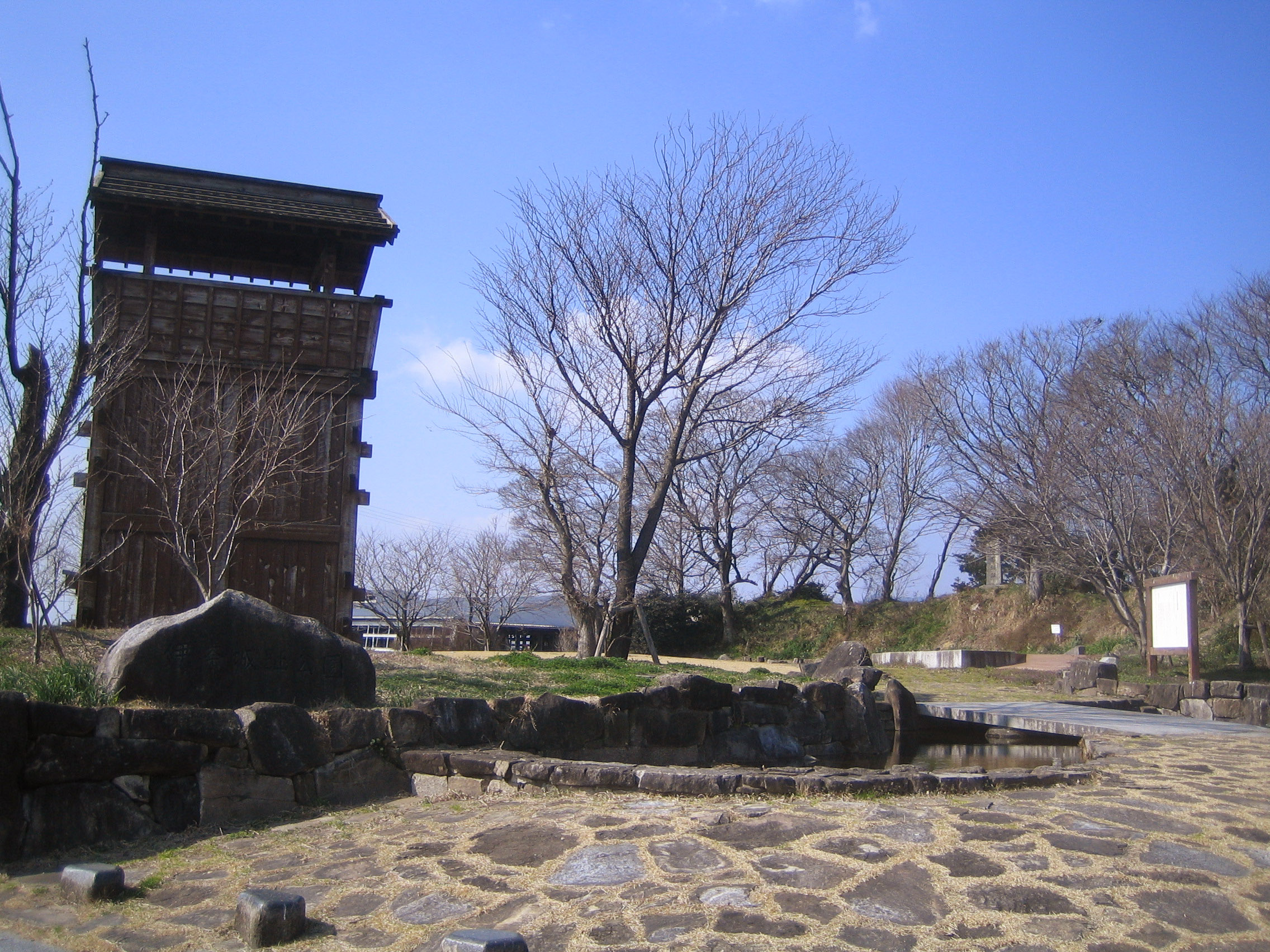
Ina Castle

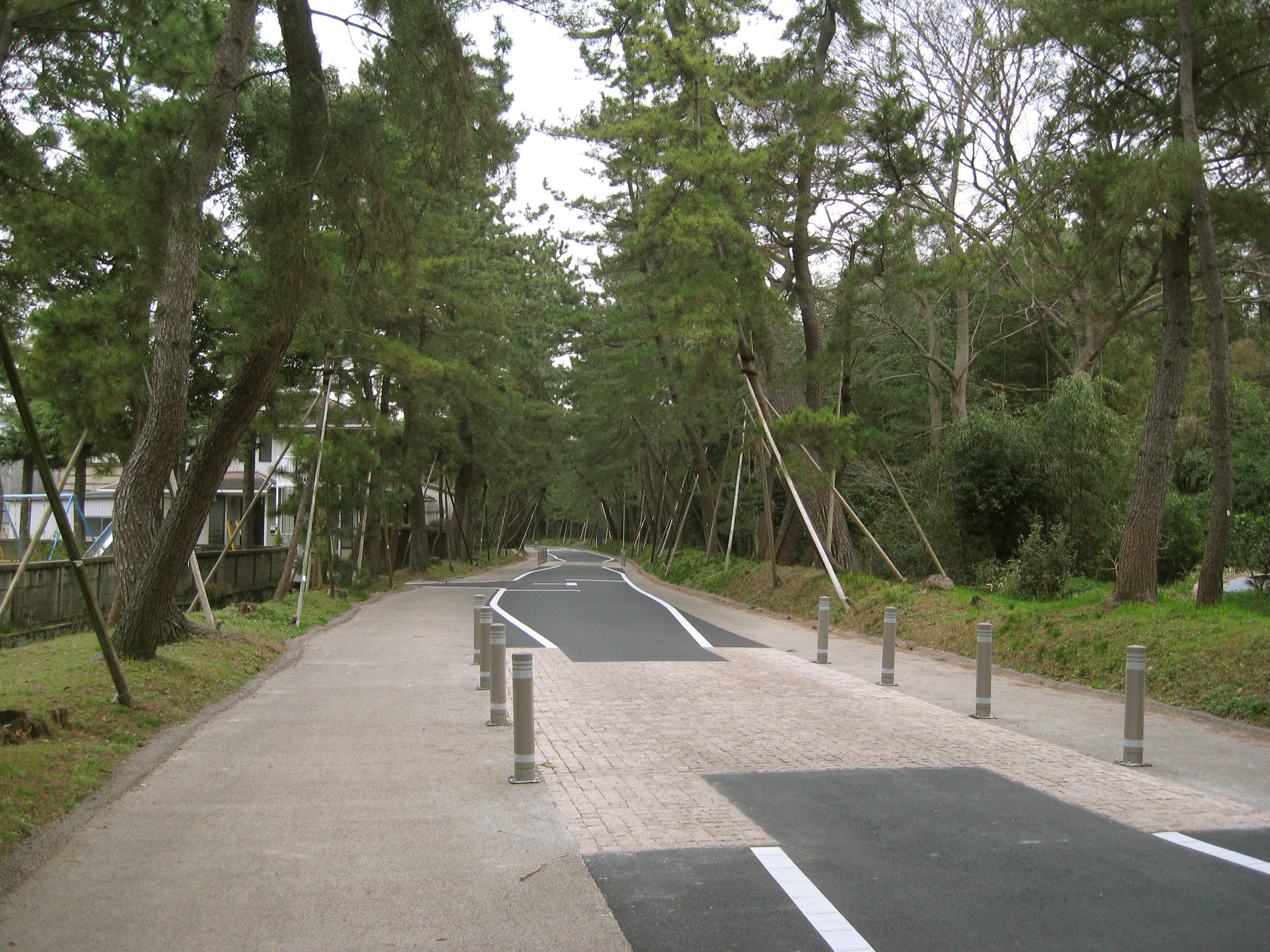
Goyu-shuku

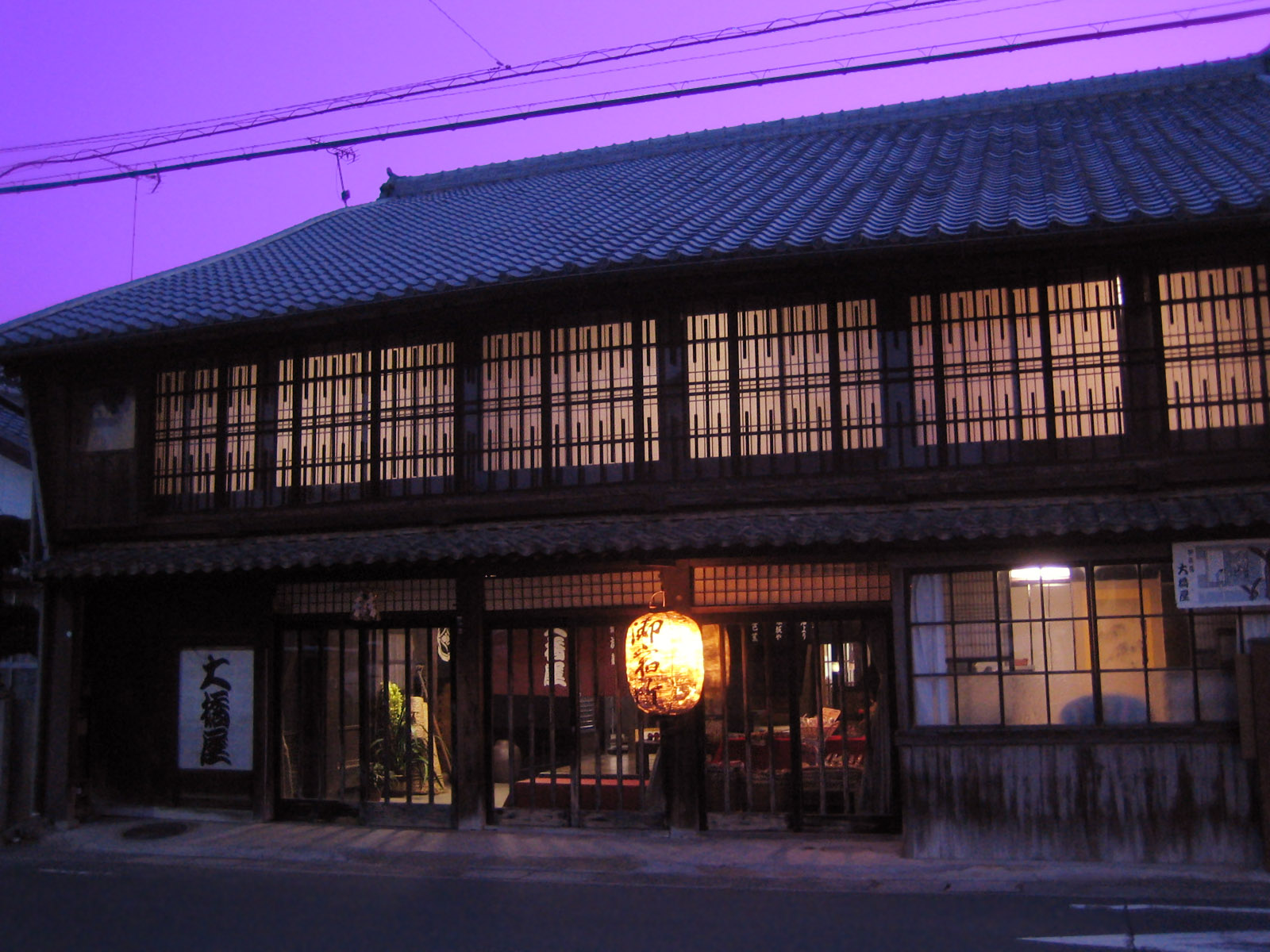
Akasaka-juku (Tōkaidō)

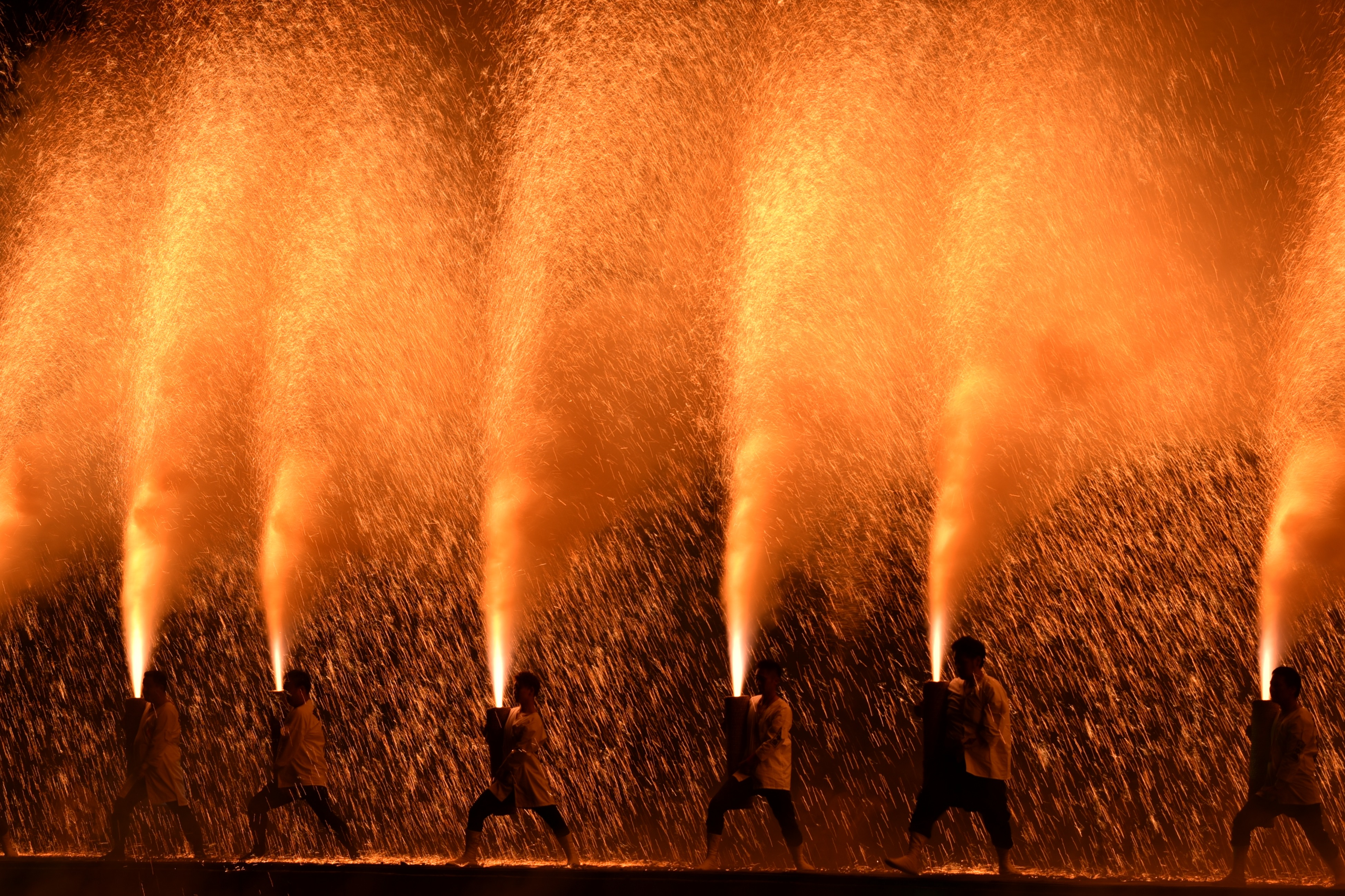
Toyokawa Tezutsu Fireworks Festival

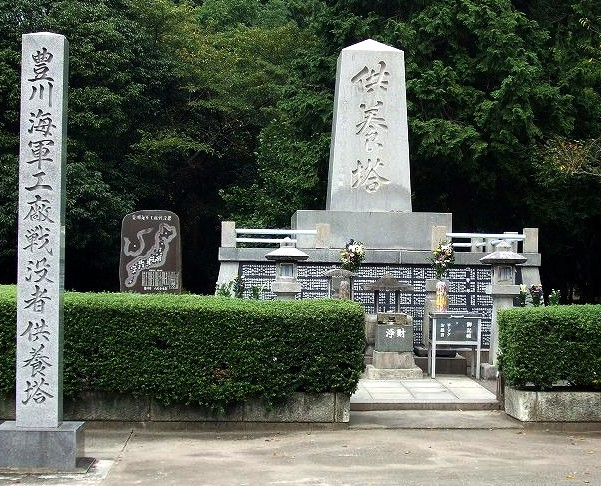
Memorial to the victims of the Toyokawa Air Raid

== Government ==
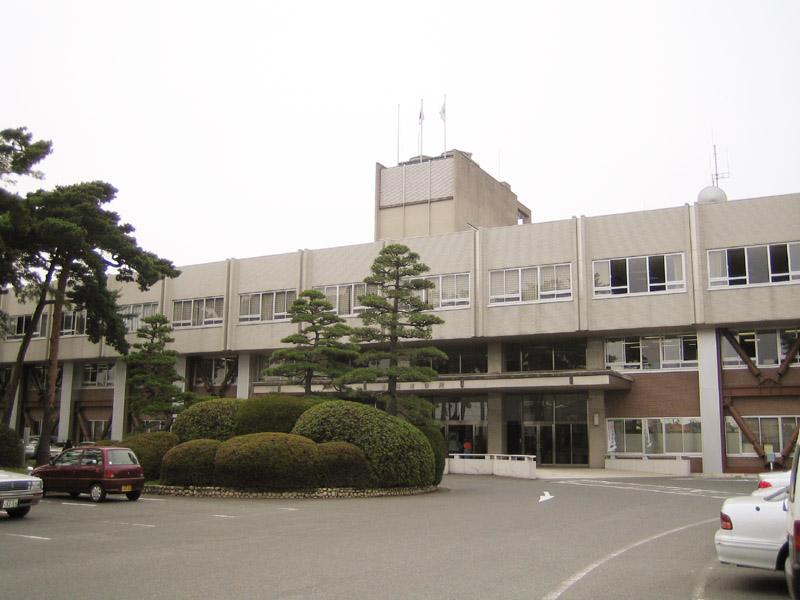
Toyokawa City Hall

Toyokawa has a mayor-council form of government with a directly elected mayor and a unicameral city legislature of 30 members. The city contributes one member to the Aichi Prefectural Assembly. In terms of national politics, the city is part of Aichi District 8 of the lower house of the Diet of Japan.

== Military facilities ==
- JGSDF Camp Toyokawa

== International relations ==
Sister cities

- Cupertino, California, United States, since 1978

Friendship city

- Xinwu District, Wuxi, Jiangsu, China, since April 15, 2009

== Education ==
Toyokawa has 26 public elementary schools and 10 public junior high schools operated by the city government, and five public high schools operated by the Aichi Prefectural Board of Education. There is also one private high school. The prefecture also operates one special education school for the handicapped.

== Transportation ==
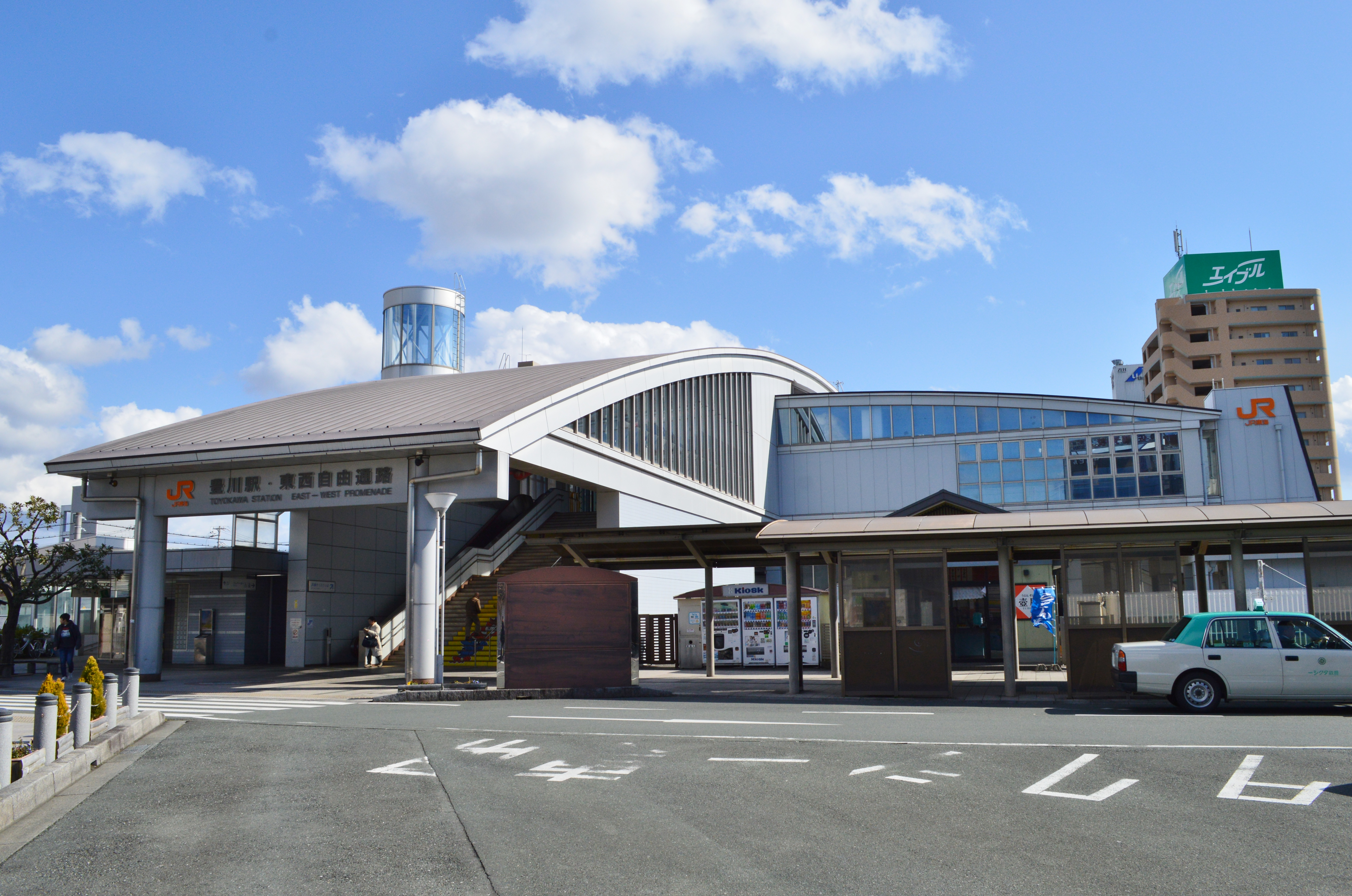
Toyokawa Station

=== Railways ===
==== Conventional lines ====
Central Japan Railway Company

- Tōkaidō Main Line: - Nishi-Kozakai – Aichi-Mito –
- Iida Line: - Kozakai – Ushikubo – Toyokawa – Mikawa-Ichinomiya – Nagayama – Ejima – Tōjō –

Meitetsu

- Nagoya Main Line: - Ina – Odabuchi – Kō – Goyu – Meiden-Akasaka – Meiden-Nagasawa –
- Toyokawa Line: - Kō – Yawata – Suwachō – Inariguchi – Toyokawa-Inari

=== Roads ===
==== Expressways ====
- Tōmei Expressway

==== Japan National Route ====
- National Route 1
- National Route 23
- National Route 151
- National Route 247
- National Route 362

=== Seaways ===
==== Seaport ====
- Port of Mito (Port of Mikawa)

== Local attractions ==
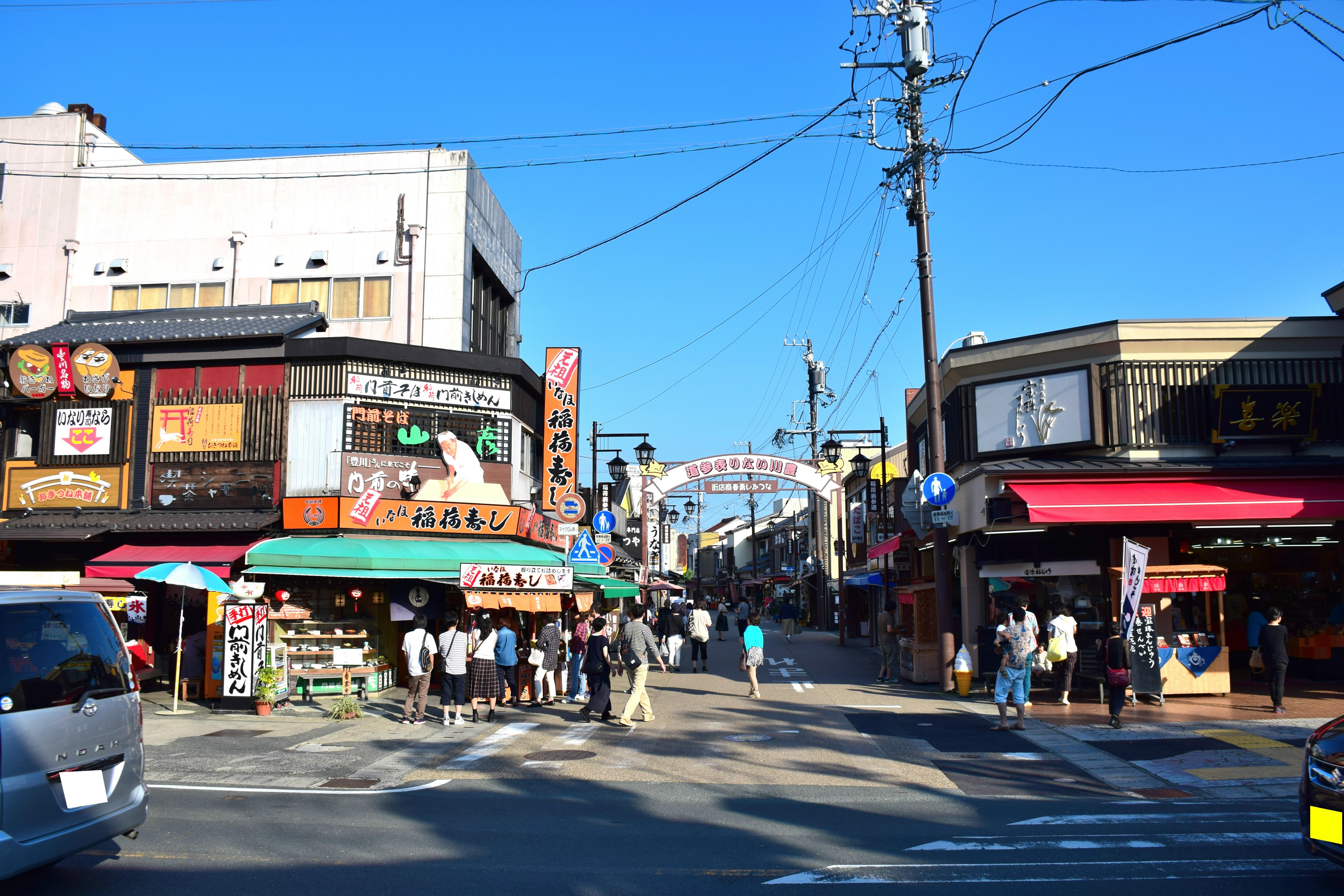
Toyokawa Inari Omotesando

Castles

- Ina Castle
- Makino Castle
- Ushikubo Castle

Temples

- Mikawa Kokubun-ji
- Toyokawa Inari – notable Buddhist temple known for its hundreds of fox statues

Shrines

- Toga Shrine – ichinomiya of Mikawa Province

== Notable people from Toyokawa ==
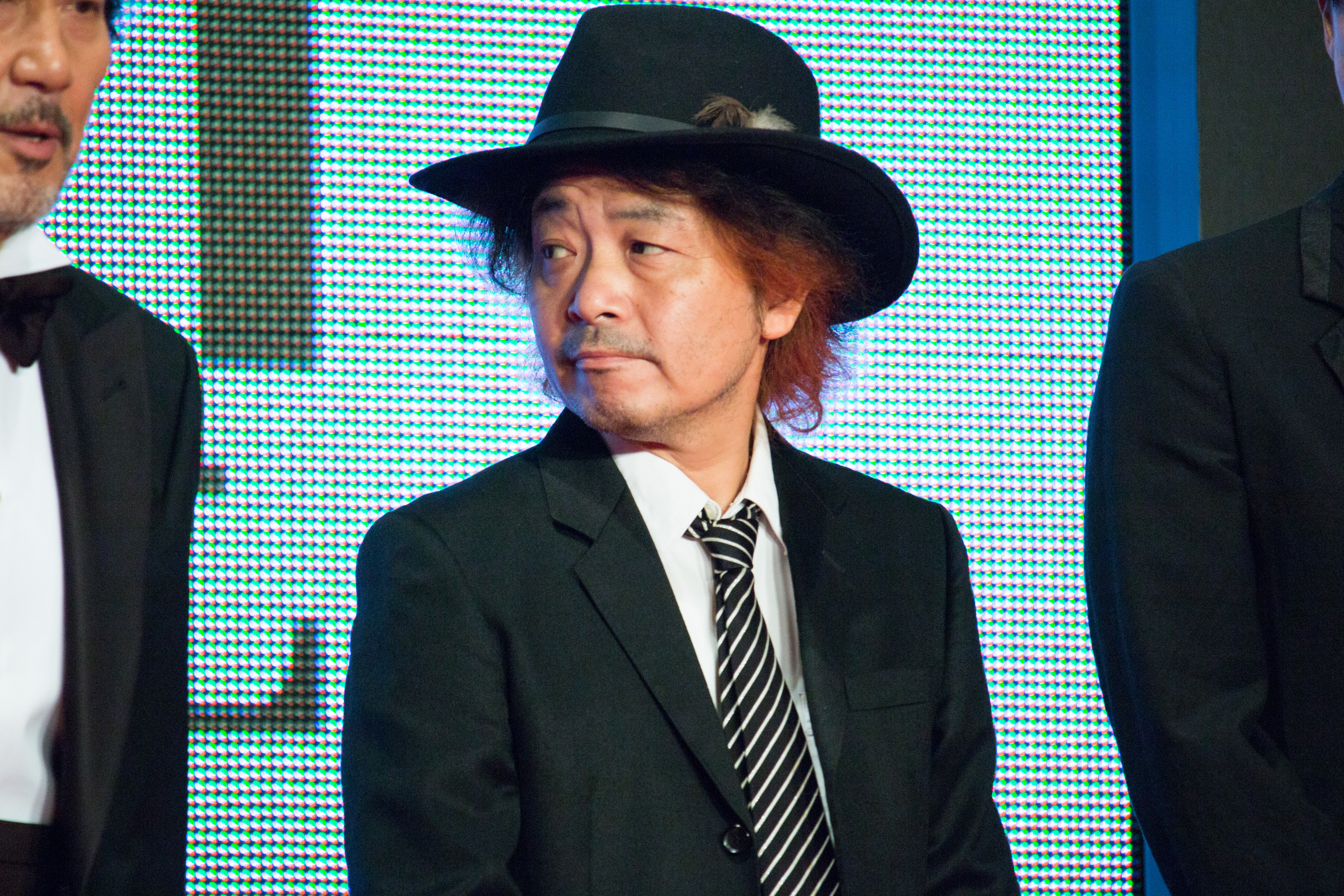
Sion Sono （2015）

- Azusa Inaba, is a Japanese professional wrestler
- Tomoka Inaba, is a Japanese professional wrestler
- Yamamoto Kansuke, Japanese Samurai of the Sengoku period
- Yuka Kato, Olympic swimmer
- Gakuto Kondo, professional soccer player
- Masahiko Morifuku, Baseball player
- Atsuya Ota, Basketball player
- Sion Sono, movie director
- Yukinari Sugawara, professional soccer player
- Yusuke Yamamoto, Japanese Actor
