= Toyokawa Station (Aichi) =

Railway station in Toyokawa, Aichi Prefecture, Japan

CD05 Toyokawa Station 豊川駅
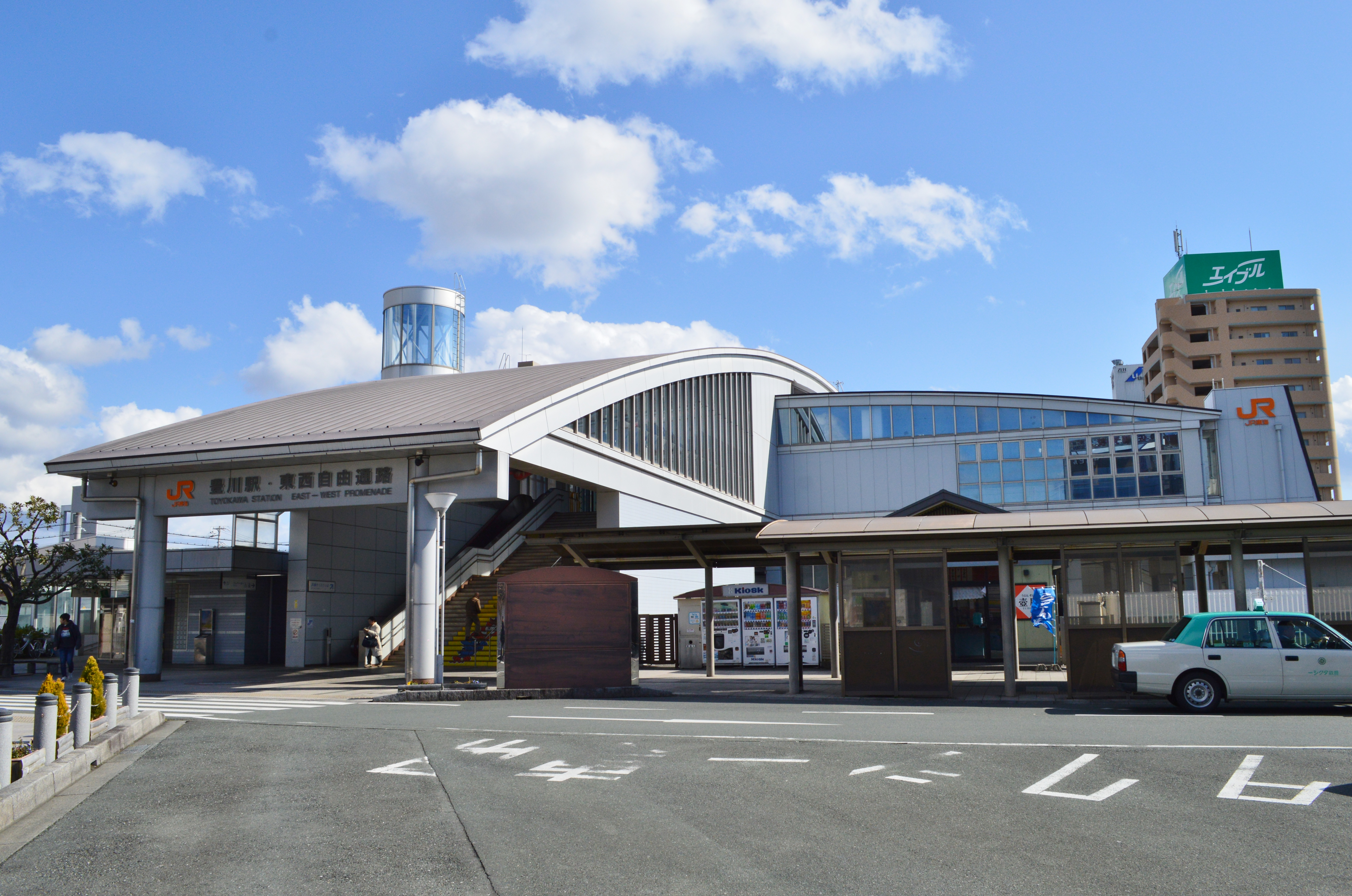
- Toyokawa Station

General information
- Location: Nihodōri-10 Toyokawachō, Toyokawa-shi, Aichi-ken 442-0033; Japan
- Coordinates: 34.8225°N 137.3971°E
- Operator: JR Central; Japan Freight Railway Company
- Line: Iida Line
- Distance: 8.7 kilometers from Toyohashi
- Platforms: 1 side + 1 island platforms

Other information
- Status: Staffed (Midori no Madoguchi)
- Station code: CD05

History
- Opened: July 15, 1897

Passengers
- FY2017: 3296 daily
Location
- Location within Aichi Prefecture Location within Japan

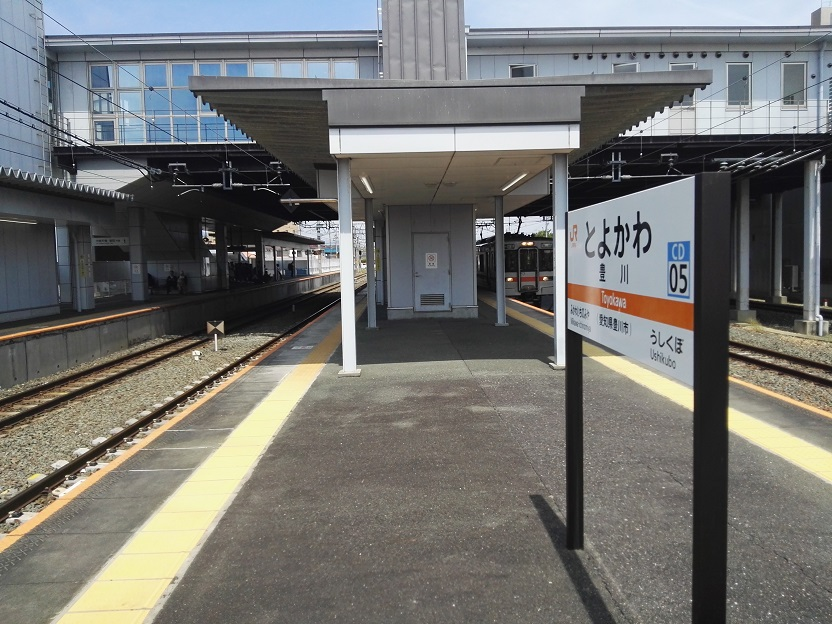
Platform

Track Layout

Toyokawa Station (豊川駅, Toyokawa-eki) is a railway station in the city of Toyokawa, Aichi Prefecture, Japan, operated by Central Japan Railway Company (JR Tōkai). It is also a freight terminal for the Japan Freight Railway Company (JR Freight).

== Lines ==
Toyokawa Station is served by the Iida Line, and is located 8.7 kilometers from the southern terminus of the line at Toyohashi Station.

== Station layout ==
The station has one island platform and one side platform connected by a footbridge. The station building was rebuilt in 1997 as an elevated station. The station building has automated ticket machines, TOICA automated turnstiles and a Midori no Madoguchi staffed ticket office.

=== Platforms ===
1	■ Iida Line	For Chūbu-Tenryū and Iida
2	■ Iida Line	For Toyohashi
3	■ Iida Line	For Toyohashi

== Adjacent stations ==
«	Service	»
Central Japan Railway Company
Iida Line
Toyohashi	Limited Express "Inaji" (特急「伊那路」)	Shinshiro
Ushikubo	Local (普通)	Mikawa-Ichinomiya

== Station history ==
Toyokawa Station was opened on July 15, 1897; 129 years ago as a terminal station on the now-defunct Toyokawa Railway (豊川鉄道, Toyokawa Tetsudō). At the time, the line consisted of Toyohashi Station, Ushikubo Station, and this station, in that order, but the line was soon extended on to Mikawa-Ichinomiya later that year. In December 1931 a modern, 3-story concrete station building was completed. A spur line, the Nishi-Toyokawa Line, connected to the station on May 12, 1942. On August 1, 1943, the Toyokawa Railway was nationalized along with some other local lines to form the Japanese Government Railways (JGR) Iida Line. The Nishi-Toyokawa Line ceased operation in 1956. Scheduled freight operations were discontinued in 1984. Along with its division and privatization of JNR on April 1, 1987, the station came under the control and operation of the Central Japan Railway Company (JR Tōkai).

== Passenger statistics ==
In fiscal 2017, the station was used by an average of 3296 passengers daily.

== Surrounding area ==
- Toyokawa Inari
- Toyokawa High School

== See also ==
- List of railway stations in Japan
