= Toyohashi Station =

Railway station in Toyohashi, Aichi Prefecture, Japan

CA42 CD00 Toyohashi Station 豊橋駅

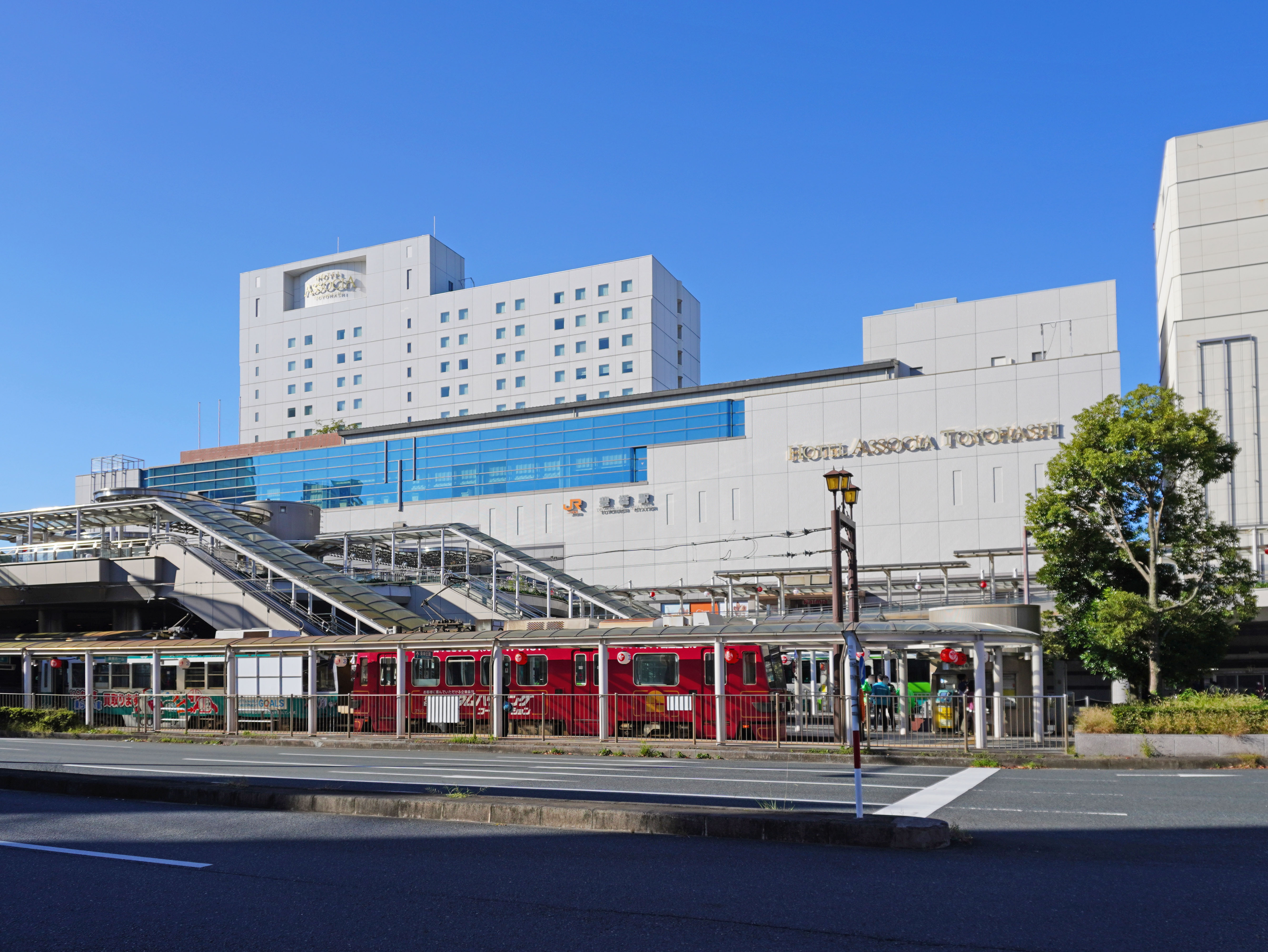
- The east side of the station in October 2022

General information
- Location: Nishijuku Hanada-cho, Toyohashi City; Aichi Prefecture; Japan
- Coordinates: 34°45′46″N 137°22′54″E
- Operator: JR Central; Meitetsu
- Lines: Tōkaidō Shinkansen; Tōkaidō Main Line; Iida Line; Nagoya Main Line
- Distance: 293.6 km (182.4 mi) from Tokyo
- Platforms: 2 side + 3 island + 1 bay platform
- Connections: Bus terminal

History
- Opened: 1 September 1888; 138 years ago
- Former names: Yoshida Station (Meitetsu only)

Passengers
- FY 2023: 50,393 daily (JR Central); 14,132 daily (Shinkansen); 33,320 daily (Meitetsu)

Services
Preceding station	JR Central	Following station
Nagoya towards Shin-Ōsaka	Tōkaidō Shinkansen Hikari	Hamamatsu towards Tokyo
Mikawa-Anjō towards Shin-Ōsaka	Tōkaidō Shinkansen Kodama	Hamamatsu towards Tokyo
Gamagōri CA47 towards Maibara	Tōkaidō Main Line Special Rapid New Rapid Rapid	Futagawa CA41 towards Atami
Nishi-Kozakai CA43 towards Maibara	Tōkaidō Main Line Semi Rapid Local	Futagawa CA41 towards Atami
- Some New Rapid trains stop at Mikawa-Ōtsuka Station or Mikawa-Miya Station
- Some Rapid trains stop at Mikawa-Miya Station
Other services
Preceding station	JR Central	Following station
Terminus	Iida Line Inaji	Toyokawa CD05 towards Okaya
Terminus	Iida Line Rapid Local (some)	Kozakai CD03 towards Okaya
Terminus	Iida Line Local	Funamachi CD01 towards Okaya
Preceding station	Meitetsu	Following station
Terminus	Nagoya Main Line Rapid Limited Express	Higashi Okazaki towards Meitetsu Gifu
Terminus	Nagoya Main Line Limited Express	Kō towards Meitetsu Gifu
Terminus	Nagoya Main Line Express	Ina towards Meitetsu Gifu
Location
- Location within Aichi Prefecture Location within Central Japan Location within Japan

Toyohashi Station (Japanese: 豊橋駅, Hepburn: Toyohashi-eki) is an interchange, union railway station in Toyohashi, Aichi, Japan, operated by Central Japan Railway Company (JR Central) and the private railway operator Nagoya Railroad (Meitetsu). The station is served by the high-speed Tokaido Shinkansen and the conventional Tōkaidō Main Line, while being the terminus of the Iida Line and the Meitetsu Nagoya Main Line. The station is assigned the station number CA42 and CD00 by JR Central, and NH01 by Meitetsu. The station was opened on 1 September 1888 as a part of the Tōkaidō Main Line.

The station as a whole is serviced by trains from 5:37 a.m. to 11:44 p.m. (JST) Almost all services stop at this station, with an exception of Nozomi shinkansen services and some Hikari shinkansen services. Japan Freight Railway Company operates Toyohashi ORS, an Off-Rail station that handles freights by trucks rather than freight trains nearby the station.

While not physically connected, Toyohashi station is located next to the Shin-Toyohashi train station and Ekimae tram station, both of which are owned by the Toyohashi Railroad. A subsidiary of Toyohashi Railroad operates a bus terminal on the east side of the station, with a bus stop on the west side.

== History ==
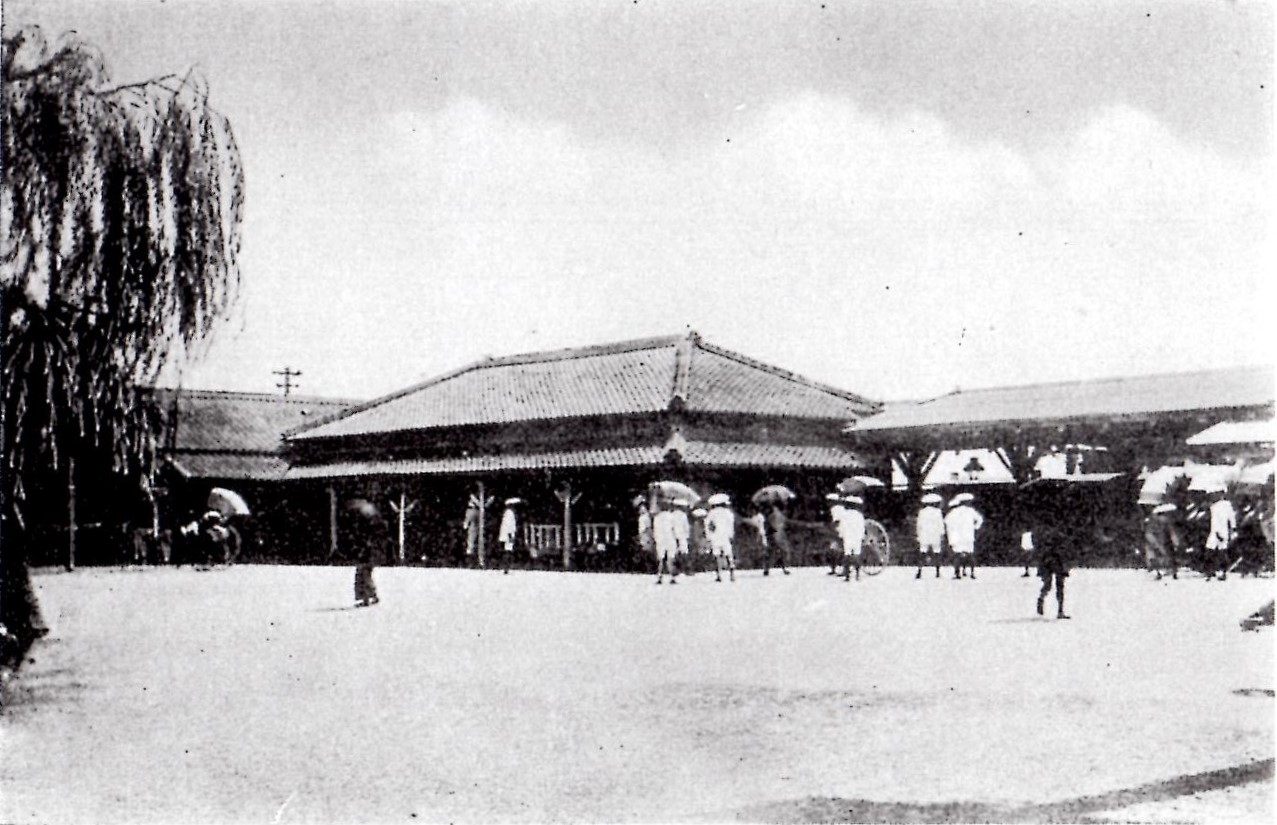
The station building in 1888

Toyohashi Station was opened on 1 September 1888 by the Japan Governmental Railways. The privately owned Toyokawa Railroad began operations to Toyohashi on 15 July 1897, but renamed its terminus Yoshida Station (吉田駅) on 11 December 1899 to differentiate itself from the government railway system. The station building was rebuilt in 1916 and 1927. On 1 June 1927, the Aichi Electric Railway (the predecessor to Meitetsu) extended the Nagoya Main Line to the station. The Toyokawa Railroad was nationalized and came under the ownership of Japan Governmental Railways on 1 August 1943. The Yoshida station was merged into Toyokawa Station on the same date, making it a union station. The station was completely lost in the Bombing of Toyohashi on 20 June 1945. The Tōkaidō Main Line took a week to return to normal service. The station was rebuilt in 1950. The station building was the first station classified as a "community station". Community stations were built partially using private funds, and the railway operator allowed commercial establishments in return. Toyohashi Station also became a station served by the Tokaido Shinkansen when it fully opened on 1 October 1964. On 1 July 1970, the station building was replaced by a larger one, which was built with reinforced concrete and housed around 100 stores. The station came under Central Japan Railway Company ownership after the privatization of Japanese National Railway on 1 April 1987.

Station numbering was introduced to all lines operated by Meitetsu in March 2016. Toyohashi Station was assigned station number NH01. The station number was assigned to the section of the Tōkaidō Line operated by JR Central as well as the Iida Line in March 2018; Toyohashi Station was assigned station number CA42 for the Tōkaidō Line and CD00 for the Iida Line.

== Station layout ==
Toyohashi Station track diagram

Local train services at Toyohashi Station are handled by five platforms serving eight tracks. The Iida Line and Meitetsu lines use three tracks terminating in a bay platform. The Tōkaidō Main Line uses a side platform and two island platforms. The Shinkansen portion of Toyohashi Station has a side platform and an island platform. Meitetsu shares tracks and the station with their competitor JR Central.

There is an unused island platform in between the local train platforms and the Shinkansen platforms. This platform was originally numbered 9 and 10, assigned to trains providing through service to the Futamata Line, which is now called the Tenryū Hamanako Line. The through service was abolished in 1987 due to the Futamata Line being transferred to a private railway operator. Since the abolition of the service, the platforms have been used as a detention line, where unused trains are temporarily kept.

The station is built at grade, which is rare for a Shinkansen station. This is because of Aichi Prefecture and Toyohashi's refusal to remove an overpass blocking the way, forcing the track to go below the overpass.

=== Platforms ===
1–2	■ Iida Line	for Toyokawa, Iida, and Tatsuno
3	■ Meitetsu Nagoya Main Line	for Jingū-mae, Meitetsu-Nagoya , Meitetsu Gifu, and Shin Unuma
4	■ Tokaido Main Line	for Nagoya, Gifu, Ōgaki, and Maibara
4	■ Iida Line	for Toyokawa, Iida, and Tatsuno
5–8	■ Tokaido Main Line	for Nagoya, Gifu, Ōgaki, Maibara, Hamamatsu and Shizuoka
11–12	■ Tōkaidō Shinkansen	for Shizuoka and Tokyo
13	■ Tōkaidō Shinkansen	for Nagoya, Shin-Osaka and Hakata

== Services ==
Toyohashi Station is served by the high-speed Tokaido Shinkansen, and the conventional Tōkaidō Main Line operated by JR Central. It is 293.6 kilometers (182.4 mi) from Tokyo Station. It is also the southern terminus of the Iida Line. The station is also a union station between Meitetsu. It is also a terminus for the 99.8-kilometer (62.0 mi) Meitetsu Nagoya Main Line.

The Toyohashi Railroad has two small stations close to Toyohashi Station: Shin-Toyohashi Station for the Atsumi Line railway and Ekimae Station for the Azumada Main Line tramway, but these stations are not physically connected to Toyohashi Station.

The two companies that own the station have competed with each other on the paralleling section between Gifu and Toyohashi. This rivalry, continued since the privatization of Japanese National Railways in 1987, has led to both sides offering discounted tickets for the adjacent section.

=== Passenger service ===
As of 2025, the JR Central part of the station is serviced by trains from 5:37 a.m. to 11:44 p.m. in Japan Standard Time. For the Tōkaidō main line services, all trains on the line stop at the station. Services in the direction of Maibara depart around twice as frequently as services in the direction of Atami. Inaji trains depart from the station two times a day. For the Tokaido Shinkansen, Nozomi services pass the station entirely, while all Kodama services and some Hikari services stop at the station. Shinkansen services depart from the station between 6:40 a.m. and 11:30 p.m. (JST), with a frequency of two or three services per hour.

For Meitetsu services, the station is not serviced by any local or semi-express trains, as neither of these services reach the station. Instead, express, limited express, and rapid limited express services terminate and depart at the station. Meitetsu services depart the station from 5:53 a.m. to 11:41 p.m. (JST) During the daytime, six services depart from the station per hour, while fewer services depart during early morning or night.

=== Freight service ===
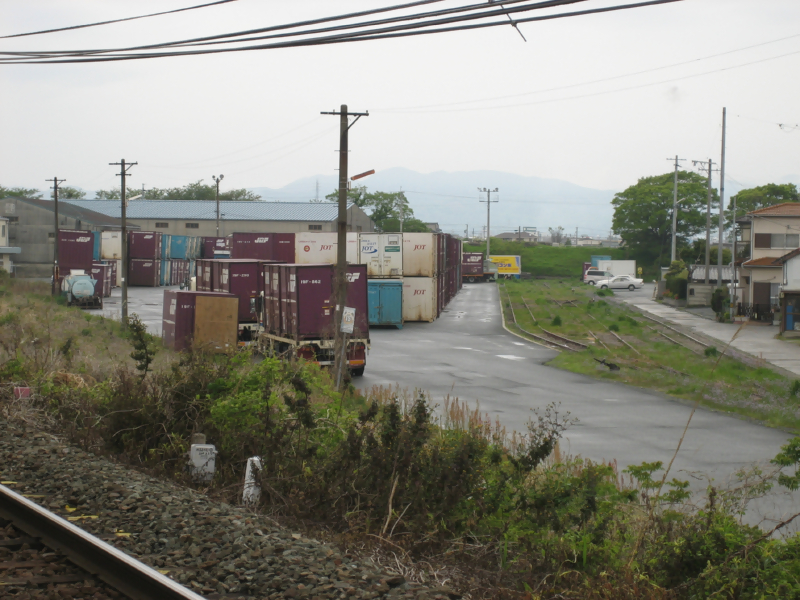
Toyohashi Off-rail Station, operated by the Japan Freight Railway Company

Japan Freight Railway Company operates the Toyohashi Off-rail Station, which does not utilize freight trains to carry freight. Instead, trucks are used to transport them to Nishi-Hamamatsu Station. While this station is no longer serviced by trains, tracks are still left in the off-rail station.

=== Bus service ===
The station is connected to the Toyohashi Station Bus Center operated by the Toyotetsu Bus, a subsidiary of Toyohashi Railroad. A bus terminal is located to the east of the station, while there is also an additional bus stop to the west of the station.

== See also ==
- List of railway stations in Japan
