= List of dissolved districts in Japan =

A district of Japan is dissolved when all towns or villages in the district become cities or are merged into the city. The following is a list of dissolved districts of Japan. The date shown is the day the district was dissolved (i.e. the district was active until that date) and the reason why the district was dissolved is also shown.

== Before Edo period ==
- Unknown Suruga District (駿河郡), Suruga, Tokaido (Renamed to Suntō District)
- Unknown Kudara District (百済郡), Settsu, (Merged into either Higashinari and Sumiyoshi Districts)
- Unknown Nuttari District (沼垂郡), Echigo, Hokurikudo (Merged into Kanbara District)
- Unknown Tajihi District (百済郡), Kawachi, (Split into Tanboku, Tannan and Yakami Districts)
- Sengoku Era Hinai District (比内郡), Mutsu, Tozando (Merged into Akita District in Dewa Province)
- Sengoku Era Ogashima District (小鹿島郡), Dewa, Tozando (Merged into Akita District)
- Sengoku Era Yamada District (山田郡), Owari, Tokaido (Split and merged into Kasugai and Aichi Districts)
- Early Edo Period Hanawa (鼻和郡), Hiraka (平賀郡), and Inaka (田舎郡) Districts, Mutsu, Tozando (Merged to form Tsugaru District)
- Early Edo Period Hiyama District (檜山郡), Dewa, Tozando (Renamed to Yamamoto District)
- Early Edo Period Toshima District (豊島郡), Dewa, Tozando (Renamed to Kawabe District)
- Early Edo Period Yamamoto District (山本郡), Dewa, Tozando (Renamed to Senboku District)
- Early Edo Period Yuza District (遊佐郡), Dewa, Tozando (Renamed to Akumi District)
- Early Edo Period Kujibiki District (櫛引郡), Dewa, Tozando (Merged into Tagawa District)
- Edo Period Shikama District (色麻郡), Mutsu, Tozando (Merged into Kami District)
- 1634 Nukanobe District (糠部郡), Mutsu, Tozando (Split into Kita, Sannohe, Ninohe, and Kunohe Districts)
- 1700 Noto District (能登郡), Noto, Hokurikudo (Renamed to Kashima District)
- 1700 Kaga District (加賀郡), Kaga, Hokurikudo (Renamed to Kahoku District)
- Edo Period Mashiki District (益城郡), Higo, Saikaido (Split into Kamimashiki and Shimomashiki Districts)

== 1868 to 1895 ==
Tōhoku

- 1878 Kita District (北郡), Mutsu (Split into Kamikita and Shimokita Districts in Aomori Prefecture)
- 1878 Tsugaru District (津軽郡), Mutsu (Split into Kitatsugaru, Minamitsugaru, Higashitsugaru, Nishitsugaru and Nakatsugaru Districts in Aomori Prefecture)
- 1878 Hei District (閉伊郡), Rikuchū (Split into Kitahei, Minamihei, Higashihei, Nishihei and Nakahei Districts in Iwate Prefecture)
- 1878 Iwai District (磐井郡), Rikuchū (Split into Higashiiwai and Nishiiwai Districts in Iwate Prefecture)
- 1878 Kunohe District (九戸郡), Rikuchū (Split into Kitakunohe and Minamikunohe Districts in Iwate Prefecture)
- 1878 Waga District (和賀郡), Rikuchū (Split into Higashiwaga and Nishiwaga Districts in Iwate Prefecture)
- 1878 Akita District (秋田郡), Ugo (Split into Kitaakita and Minamiakita Districts in Akita Prefecture)
- 1878 Tagawa District (田川郡), Uzen (Split into Higashitagawa and Nishitagawa Districts in Yamagata Prefecture)
- 1878 Murayama District (村山郡), Uzen (Split into Kitamurayama, Minamimurayama, Higashimurayama, and Nishimurayama Districts in Yamagata Prefecture)
- 1878 Okitama District (置賜郡), Uzen (Split into Higashiokitama, Nishiokitama, and Minamiokitama Districts in Yamagata Prefecture)
- 1878 Aizu District (会津郡), Iwashiro (Split into Kitaaizu and Minamiaizu Districts in Fukushima Prefecture)
- 1878 Shirakawa District (白川郡), Iwaki (Renamed to Higashishirakawa District in Fukushima Prefecture)
- 1878 Shirakawa District (白河郡), Iwaki (Renamed to Nishishirakawa District in Fukushima Prefecture)

Kantō

- 1878 Ibaraki District (茨城郡), Hitachi (Split into Higashiibaraki and Nishiibaraki Districts in Ibaraki Prefecture)
- 1878 Tsuga District (都賀郡), Shimotsuke (Split into Kamitsuga and Shimotsuga Districts in Tochigi Prefecture)
- 1878 Gunma District (群馬郡), Kōzuke (Split into Higashigunma and Nishigunma Districts in Gunma Prefecture)
- 1878 Kanra District (甘楽郡), Kōzuke (Split into Kitakanra and Minamikanra Districts in Gunma Prefecture)
- 1878 Seta District (勢多郡), Kōzuke (Split into Kitaseta and Minamiseta Districts in Gunma Prefecture)
- 1878 Habu District (埴生郡), Kazusa (Renamed to Kamihabu District in Chiba Prefecture)
- 1878 Habu District (埴生郡), Shimōsa (Renamed to Shimohabu District in Chiba Prefecture)
- 1878 Sōma District (相馬郡), Shimōsa (Split into Kitasōma District in Ibaraki Prefecture and Minamisōma District in Chiba Prefecture)
- 1878 Katsushika District (葛飾郡), Shimōsa (Split into Nishikatsushika District in Ibaraki Prefecture, Nakakatsushika District in Saitama Prefecture, and Higashikatsushika District in Chiba Prefecture)
- 1878 Katsushika District (葛飾郡), Musashi (Split into Kitakatsushika District in Saitama Prefecture and Minamikatsushika District in Tokyo Prefecture)
- 1878 Saitama District (埼玉郡), Musashi (Split into Kitasaitama and Minamisaitama Districts in Saitama Prefecture)
- 1878 Adachi District (足立郡), Musashi (Split into Kitadachi District in Saitama Prefecture and Minamiadachi District in Tokyo Prefecture)
- 1878 Toshima District (豊嶋郡), Musashi (Split into Kitatoshima and Minamitoshima Districts in Tokyo Prefecture)
- 1878 Tama District (多摩郡), Musashi (Split into Higashitama District in Tokyo Prefecture, Kitatama, Minamitama, and Nishitama Districts in Kanagawa Prefecture; the latter 3 were transferred to Tokyo Prefecture in 1893)

Chūbu

- 1878 Kanbara District (蒲原郡), Echigo (Split into Kitakanbara, Minamikanbara, Higashikanbara, Nishikanbara and Nakakanbara Districts, and the borough (-ku) of Niigata in Niigata Prefecture)
- 1878 Uonuma District (魚沼郡), Echigo (Split into Kitauonuma, Nakauonuma, and Minamiuonuma Districts in Niigata Prefecture)
- 1878 Kubiki District (頸城郡), Echigo (Split into Higashikubiki, Nakakubiki, and Nishikubiki Districts in Niigata Prefecture)
- 1878 Niikawa District (新川郡), Ecchu (Split into Kaminiikawa and Shimoniikawa Districts in Toyama Prefecture)
- 1878 Tsuru District (都留郡), Kai (Split into Kitatsuru and Minamitsuru Districts in Yamanashi Prefecture)
- 1878 Yamanashi District (山梨郡), Kai (Split into Higashiyamanashi and Nishiyamanashi Districts in Yamanashi Prefecture)
- 1878 Yatsushiro District (八代郡), Kai (Split into Higashiyatsushiro and Nishiyatsushiro Districts in Yamanashi Prefecture)
- 1878 Koma District (巨摩郡), Kai (Split into Kitakoma, Nakakoma, and Minamikoma Districts in Yamanashi Prefecture)
- 1878 Saku District (佐久郡), Shinano (Split into Kitasaku and Minamisaku Districts in Nagano Prefecture)
- 1878 Takai District (高井郡), Shinano (Split into Kamitakai and Shimotakai Districts in Nagano Prefecture)
- 1878 Minochi District (水内郡), Shinano (Split into Kamiminochi and Shimominochi Districts in Nagano Prefecture)
- 1878 Ina District (伊那郡), Shinano (Split into Kamiina and Shimoina Districts in Nagano Prefecture)
- 1878 Chikuma District (筑摩郡), Shinano (Split into Higashichikuma and Nishichikuma Districts in Nagano Prefecture)
- 1878 Azumi District (安曇郡), Shinano (Split into Kitaazumi and Minamiazumi Districts in Nagano Prefecture)
- 1878 Ishizu District (石津郡), Mino (Split into Kamiishizu and Shimoishizu Districts in Gifu Prefecture)
- 1878 Shitara District (設楽郡), Mikawa (Split into Kitashitara and Minamishitara Districts in Aichi Prefecture)
- 1878 Kamo District (加茂郡), Mikawa (Split into Higashikamo and Nishikamo Districts in Aichi Prefecture)
- 1878 Kasugai District (春日井郡), Owari (Split into Higashikasugai and Nishikasugai Districts in Aichi Prefecture)

Kansai

- 1878 Muro District (牟婁郡), Kii (Split into Kitamuro and Minamimuro Districts in Mie Prefecture and Higashimuro and Nishimuro Districts in Wakayama Prefecture)
- 1878 Azai District (浅井郡), Ōmi (Split into Higashiazai and Nishiazai Districts in Shiga Prefecture)
- 1878 Kuwata District (桑田郡), Tanba (Split into Kitakuwada and Minamikuwada Districts in Kyoto Prefecture)

Shikoku

- 1878 Ukena District (浮穴郡), Iyo (Split into Kamiukena and Shimoukena Districts in Ehime Prefecture)
- 1878 Uwa District (宇和郡), Iyo (Split into Higashiuwa, Nishiuwa, Kitauwa, and Minamiuwa Districts in Ehime Prefecture)

Kyushu

- 1878 Matsuura District (松浦郡), Hizen (Split into Higashimatsuura, Nishimatsuura, Kitamatsuura, and Minamimatsuura Districts in Nagasaki Prefecture; the former two were transferred to Saga Prefecture in 1883)
- 1878 Sonogi District (彼杵郡), Hizen (Split into Higashisonogi and Nishisonogi Districts, and the borough (-ku) of Nagasaki in Nagasaki Prefecture)
- 1878 Takaki District (高来郡), Hizen (Split into Kitatakaki and Minamitakaki Districts in Nagasaki Prefecture)
- 1878 Kunisaki District (国東郡), Bungo (Split into Higashikunisaki and Nishikunisaki Districts in Ōita Prefecture)
- 1878 Amabe District (海部郡), Bungo (Split into Kitaamabe and Minamiamabe Districts in Ōita Prefecture)
- 1878 Usuki District (臼杵郡), Hyūga (Split into Higashiusuki and Nishiusuki Districts in Miyazaki Prefecture)
- 1878 Naka District (那珂郡), Hyūga (Split into Kitanaka and Minaminaka Districts in Miyazaki Prefecture)
- 1878 Ōsumi District (大隅郡), Ōsumi (Split into Kitaōsumi and Minamiōsumi Districts in Kagoshima Prefecture)
- 1878 Soo District (囎唹郡), Ōsumi (Split into Higashisoo and Nishisoo Districts in Kagoshima Prefecture)
- 1878 Isa District (伊佐郡), Satsuma (Split into Kitaisa and Minamiisa Districts in Kagoshima Prefecture)

Others

- January 1, 1879 Iwate District (磐井郡), Rikuchū (Split into Kitaiwate and Minamiiwate Districts in Iwate Prefecture)
- July 8, 1881 Abashiri District (網尻郡), Kushiro, Hokkaido (Merged into Abashiri District in Kitami Province)
- July 27, 1881 Tsugaru (津軽郡) and Fukushima (福島郡) Districts, Oshima, Hokkaido (Merged to form Matsumae District)
- May 9, 1883 Morokata District (諸県郡), Hyūga (Due to the split of Kagoshima Prefecture, the area became part of the new Miyazaki Prefecture becomes Kitamorokata District and parts remaining in Kagoshima Prefecture became Minamimorokata District)
- April 1, 1889 Samukawa District (寒川郡), Tochigi (Merged into Shimotsuga District)

== 1896 ==
February 26, 1896

- Nakatsu District (仲津郡), Fukuoka (Merged into Miyako District)
- Tsuiki (築城郡) and Kōge (上毛郡) Districts, Fukuoka (Merged to form Chikujō District)
- Ito (怡土郡) and Shima (志摩郡) Districts, Fukuoka (Merged to form Itoshima District)
- Mikasa (御笠郡), Mushiroda (席田郡), and Naka (那珂郡) Districts, Fukuoka (Merged to form Chikushi District)
- Kama (嘉麻郡) and Honami (穂波郡) Districts, Fukuoka (Merged to form Kaho District)
- Johza (上座郡), Geza (下座郡), and Yasu (夜須郡) Districts, Fukuoka (Merged to form Asakura District)
- Kamitsuma (上妻郡) and Shimotsuma (下妻郡) Districts, Fukuoka (Merged to form Yame District)
- Ikuha (生葉郡) and Takeno (竹野郡) Districts, Fukuoka (Merged to form Ukiha District)
- Mii (御井郡), Mihara (御原郡), and Yamamoto (山本郡) Districts, Fukuoka (Merged to form Mii District)

March 26, 1896

- Osumi (大住郡) and Yurugi (淘綾郡) Districts, Kanagawa (Merged to form Naka District)
- Mine (三根郡), Yabu (養父郡), and Kii (基肄郡) Districts, Saga (Merged to form Miyaki District)

March 29, 1896

- Kitakunohe (北九戸郡) and Minamikunohe (南九戸郡) Districts, Iwate (Merged to form Kunohe District)
- Kitaiwate (北岩手郡) and Minamiiwate (南岩手郡) Districts, Iwate (Merged to form Iwate District)
- Higashiwaga (東和賀郡) and Nishiwaga (西和賀郡) Districts, Iwate (Merged to form Waga District)
- Nishihei (西閉伊郡) and Minamihei (南閉伊郡) Districts, Iwate (Merged to form Kamihei District)
- Kitahei (北閉伊郡), Nakahei (中閉伊郡), and Higashihei (東閉伊郡) Districts, Iwate (Merged to form Shimohei District)
- Nishikatsushika District (西葛飾郡), Ibaraki (Merged into Sashima District)
- Kawachi (河内郡) and Shida (信太郡) Districts, Ibaraki (Merged to form Inashiki District)
- Toyoda (豊田郡) and Okada (岡田郡) Districts, Ibaraki (Merged into Yūki District)
- Koma District (高麗郡), Saitama (Merged into Iruma District)
- Niikura District (新座郡), Saitama (Merged into Kitaadachi District)
- Hatara (幡羅郡), Hanzawa (榛沢郡), and Obusuma (男衾郡) Districts, Saitama (Merged into Ōsato District)
- Kami (賀美郡) and Naka (那珂郡) Districts, Saitama (Merged into Kodama District)
- Yokomi District (横見郡), Saitama (Merged into Hiki District)
- Nakakatsushika District (中葛飾郡), Shimōsa, Saitama (Merged into Kitakatsushika District in Musashi Province)
- Asake District (朝明郡), Mie (Merged into Mie District)
- Kawawa (河曲郡) and Anki (奄芸郡) Districts, Mie (Merged to form Kawage District)
- Iino (飯野郡) and Iitaka (飯高郡) Districts, Mie (Merged to form Iinan District)
- Ahai (阿拝郡) and Yamada (山田郡) Districts, Mie (Merged to form Ayama District)
- Nabari (名張郡) and Iga (伊賀郡) Districts, Mie (Merged to form Naga District)
- Tōshi (答志郡) and Ago (英虞郡) Districts, Mie (Merged to form Shima District)
- Soejimo (添下郡) and Heguri (平群郡) Districts, Nara (Merged to form Ikoma District)
- Hirose (広瀬郡) and Katsuge (葛下郡) Districts, Nara (Merged to form Kitakatsuragi District)
- Katsujō (葛上郡) and Oshimi (忍海郡) Districts, Nara (Merged to form Minamikatsuragi District)
- Shikijō (式上郡), Shikige (式下郡), and Toichi (十市郡) Districts, Nara (Merged to form Shiki District)
- Ōmi (邑美郡), Hōmi (法美郡), and Iwai (岩井郡) Districts, Tottori (Merged to form Iwami District)
- Yakami (八上郡), Hattō (八東郡), and Chizu (智頭郡) Districts, Tottori (Merged to form Yazu District)
- Takakusa (高草郡) and Keta (気多郡) Districts, Tottori (Merged to form Ketaka District)
- Kawamura (河村郡), Kume (久米郡), and Yabase (八橋郡) Districts, Tottori (Merged to form Tōhaku District)
- Aseri (汗入郡) and Aimi (会見郡) Districts, Tottori (Merged to form Saihaku District)
- Minamimorokata (南諸県郡) and Higashisoo (東囎唹郡) Districts, Kagoshima (Merged to form Soo District)
- Kuwabara (桑原郡) and Nishisoo (西囎唹郡), Kagoshima (Merged into Aira District)
- Minamiōsumi District (南大隅郡), Kagoshima (Merged into Kimotsuki District)
- Gomu District (馭謨郡), Kagoshima (Merged into Kumage District)
- Hishikari District (菱刈郡) in Ōsumi and Kitaisa District (北伊佐郡) in Satsuma, Kagoshima (Merged to form Isa District)
- Minamiisa (南伊佐郡), Koshikijima (甑島郡), and Taki (高城郡) Districts, Kagoshima (Merged into Satsuma District)
- Ata District (阿多郡), Kagoshima (Merged into Hioki District)
- Kiire District (給黎郡), Kagoshima (Split and merged into Kawanabe and Ibusuki Districts)
- Ei District (頴娃郡), Kagoshima (Merged along with parts of Kiire District into Ibusuki District)
- Taniyama (谿山郡) and Kitaōsumi (北大隅郡) Districts, Kagoshima (Merged into Kagoshima District)

April 1, 1896

- Uda (宇多郡) and Namekata (行方郡) Districts, Fukushima (Merged to form Sōma District)
- Shineha (標葉郡) and Naraha (楢葉郡) Districts, Fukushima (Merged to form Futaba District)
- Iwaki (磐城郡), Iwasaki (磐前郡), and Kikuta (菊多郡) Districts, Fukushima (Merged to form Iwaki District)
- Yanada District (梁田郡), Tochigi (Merged into Ashikaga District)
- Sai (佐位郡) and Nawa (那波郡) Districts, Gunma (Merged to form Sawa District)
- Kitaseta District (北勢多郡), Gunma (Merged into Tone District)
- Minamiseta (南勢多郡) and Higashigunma (東群馬郡) Districts, Gunma (Merged to form Seta District)
- Kataoka (片岡郡) and Nishigunma (西群馬郡) Districts, Gunma (Merged to form Gunma District)
- Tago (多胡郡), Midono (緑野郡), and Minamikanra (南甘楽郡) Districts, Gunma (Merged to form Tano District)
- Minamitoshima (南豊島郡) and Higashitama (東多摩郡), Tokyo (Merged to form Toyotama District)
- Sawata (雑太郡), Kamo (賀茂郡), and Hamochi (羽茂郡) Districts, Niigata (Merged to form Sado District)
- Kimisawa District (君沢郡), Shizuoka (Merged with Tagata District and parts of Kamo District to form Tagata District)
- Naka District (那賀郡), Shizuoka (Merged with parts of Kamo District to form Kamo District)
- Udo District (有渡郡), Shizuoka (Merged into Abe District)
- Mashizu District (益津郡), Shizuoka (Merged into Shida District)
- Saya (佐野郡) and Kitō (城東郡) Districts, Shizuoka (Merged to form Ogasa District)
- Toyoda District (豊田郡), Shizuoka (Merged into Iwata District)
- Yamana District (山名郡), Shizuoka (Merged into Iwata District)
- Fuchi (敷知郡) and Nagakami (長上郡) Districts, Shizuoka (Merged into Hamana District)
- Aratama District (麁玉郡), Shizuoka (Merged into Inasa District)
- Tonami District (礪波郡), Toyama (Split into Nishitonami (西礪波郡) and Higashitonami (東礪波郡) Districts)
- Teshima (豊島郡) and Nose (能勢郡) Districts, Osaka (Merged to form Toyono District)
- Shimakami (島上郡) and Shimashimo (島下郡) Districts, Osaka (Merged to form Mishima District)
- Sumiyoshi District (住吉郡), Osaka (Merged into Higashinari District)
- Katano (交野郡), Matta (茨田郡), and Sasara (讃良郡) Districts, Osaka (Merged to form Kitakawachi District)
- Shiki District (志紀郡), Osaka (Split and merged into Nakakawachi and Minamikawachi Districts)
- Wakae (若江郡), Shibukawa (渋川郡), Kawachi (河内郡), Takayasu (高安郡), Ōgata (大県郡), and Tanboku (丹北郡) Districts, Osaka (Merged along with parts of Shiki District (三木本村) to form Nakakawachi District)
- Ishikawa (石川郡), Nishigori (錦部郡), Yakami (八上郡), Furuichi (古市郡), Asukabe (安宿部郡), and Tannan (丹南郡) Districts, Osaka (Merged along with most of Shiki District (excluding the village of 三木本) to form Minamikawachi District)
- Ōtori (大鳥郡) and Izumi (和泉郡) Districts, Osaka (Merged to form Senboku District)
- Minami (南郡) and Hine (日根郡) Districts, Osaka (Merged to form Sennan District)
- Keta (気多郡) and Mikumi (美含郡) Districts, Hyōgo (Merged into Kinosaki District)
- Ubara (菟原郡) and Yatabe (八部郡) Districts, Hyōgo (Merged into Muko District)
- Futakata (二方郡) and Shitsumi (七美郡) Districts, Hyōgo (Merged to form Mikata District)
- Ittō (揖東郡) and Issai (揖西郡) Districts, Hyōgo (Merged to form Ibo District)
- Jintō (神東郡) and Jinsai (神西郡) Districts, Hyōgo (Merged to form Kanzaki District)
- Shikitō (飾東郡) and Shikisai (飾西郡) Districts, Hyōgo (Merged to form Shikama District)
- Ama (海部郡) and Nagusa (名草郡) Districts, Wakayama (Merged to form Kaisō District)
- Shimane (島根郡), Aika (秋鹿郡), and Ou (意宇郡) Districts, Shimane (Merged to form Yatsuka District)
- Izumo (出雲郡), Tatenui (楯縫郡), and Kando (神門郡) Districts, Shimane (Merged to form Hikawa District)
- Mishima District (見島郡), Yamaguchi (Merged into Abu District)
- Ishida District (石田郡), Nagasaki (Merged into Iki District)
- Akita (飽田郡) and Takuma (託麻郡) Districts, Kumamoto (Merged to form Hōtaku District)
- Yamaga (山鹿郡) and Yamamoto (山本郡) Districts, Kumamoto (Merged to form Kamoto District)
- Gōshi District (合志郡), Kumamoto (Merged into Kikuchi District)
- Kitanaka District (北那珂郡), Miyazaki (Merged into Miyazaki District)

April 18, 1896

- Nakashima (中島郡) and Haguri (羽栗郡) Districts, Gifu (Merged to form Hashima District)
- Taki District (多芸郡), Gifu (Split and merged into Yōrō and Anpachi Districts)
- Kamiishizu District (上石津郡), Gifu (Merged with parts of Taki District to form Yōrō District)
- Kaisai (海西郡) and Shimoishizu (下石津郡) Districts, Gifu (Merged with parts of Anpachi District to form Kaizu District)
- Kakami (各務郡) and Atsumi (厚見郡) Districts, Gifu (Merged with parts of Katagata District to form Inaba District)
- Katagata District (方県郡), Gifu (Split and became part of Inaba, Motosu, and Yamagata Districts)
- Mushiroda District (席田郡), Gifu (Merged with Motosu District, parts of Katagata District, and parts of Ōno District to form Motosu District)
- Ōno District (大野郡), Mino, Gifu (Split and became part of Motosu and Ibi Districts)
- Ikeda District (池田郡), Gifu (Merged with parts of Ōno District to form Ibi District)
- Shūfu (周布郡) and Kuwamura (桑村郡) Districts, Ehime (Merged to form Shūsō District)
- Noma District (野間郡), Ehime (Merged into Ochi District)
- Kazahaya (風早郡), Wake (和気郡), and Kume (久米郡) Districts, Ehime (Merged along with parts of Shimonukena District into Onsen District)
- Shimoukena District (下浮穴郡), Ehime (Split and merged into parts of Onsen and Iyo Districts)

== 1897~1912 ==
- April 1, 1897 Minamisōma District (南相馬郡), Chiba (Merged into Higashikatsushika District)
- April 1, 1897 Shimohabu District (下埴生郡), Chiba (Merged into Inba District)
- April 1, 1897 Hei (平郡), Asai (朝夷郡), and Nagasa (長狭郡) Districts, Chiba (Merged into Awa District)
- April 1, 1897 Mōda (望陀郡), Sue (周淮郡), and Amaha (天羽郡) Districts, Chiba (Merged to form Kimitsu District)
- April 1, 1897 Yamabe (山辺郡) and Musha (武射郡) Districts, Chiba (Merged to form Sanbu District)
- April 1, 1897 Nagara (長柄郡) and Kamihabu (上埴生郡) Districts, Chiba (Merged to form Chōsei District)
- April 1, 1897 Nishiazai District (西浅井郡), Shiga (Merged into Ika District)
- October 1, 1898 Fukatsu (深津郡) and Yasuna (安那郡) Districts, Hiroshima (Merged to form Fukayasu District)
- October 1, 1898 Ashida (芦田郡) and Honji (品治郡) Districts, Hiroshima (Merged to form Ashina District)
- October 1, 1898 Miyoshi (三次郡) and Mitani (三谿郡) Districts, Hiroshima (Merged to form Futami District)
- October 1, 1898 Nuka (奴可郡), Mikami (三上郡), and Eso (恵蘇郡) Districts, Hiroshima (Merged to form Hiba District)
- October 1, 1898 Numata (沼田郡) and Takamiya (高宮郡) Districts, Hiroshima (Merged to form Asa District)
- March 16, 1899 Ōuchi (大内郡) and Sangawa (寒川郡) Districts, Kagawa (Merged to form Ōkawa District)
- March 16, 1899 Miki (三木郡) and Yamada (山田郡) Districts, Kagawa (Merged to form Kita District)
- March 16, 1899 Aya (阿野郡) and Uta (鵜足郡) Districts, Kagawa (Merged to form Ayauta District)
- March 16, 1899 Naka (那珂郡) and Tado (多度郡) Districts, Kagawa (Merged to form Nakatado District)
- March 16, 1899 Mino (三野郡) and Toyota (豊田郡) Districts, Kagawa (Merged to form Mitoyo District)
- April 1, 1900 Mashima (真島郡), and Ōba (大庭郡) Districts, Okayama (Merged to form Maniwa District)
- April 1, 1900 Saisaijō (西西条郡), Saihokujō (西北条郡), Tōnanjō (東南条郡), and Tōhokujō (東北条郡) Districts, Okayama (Merged to form Tomata District)
- April 1, 1900 Shōboku (勝北郡) and Shōnan (勝南郡) Districts, Okayama (Merged to form Katsuta District)
- April 1, 1900 Yoshino District (吉野郡), Okayama (Merged into Aida District)
- April 1, 1900 Kumehokujō (久米北条郡) and Kumenanjō (久米南条郡), Okayama (Merged to form Kume District)
- April 1, 1900 Mino (御野郡) and Tsudaka (津高郡) Districts, Okayama (Merged to form Mitsu District)
- April 1, 1900 Akasaka (赤坂郡) and Iwanashi (磐梨郡) Districts, Okayama (Merged to form Akaiwa District)
- April 1, 1900 Tsuu (都宇郡) and Kuboya (窪屋郡) Districts, Okayama (Merged to form Tsukubo District)
- April 1, 1900 Kayō (賀陽郡) and Shimotsu (下道郡) Districts, Okayama (Merged to form Kibi District)
- April 1, 1900 Tetta (哲多郡) and Aga (阿賀郡) Districts, Okayama (Merged to form Atetsu District)
- April 1, 1906 Tōbui District (当縁郡), Hokkaido (The villages of Taiki (大樹村), Berufune (歴舟村), and parts of Tōbui (当縁村) merged with other villages to form the village of Moyori (茂寄村) in Hiroo District; parts of the village of Tōbui merged with other villages to form the village of Ōtsu (大津村) in Tokachi District)

== 1912~1926 ==
- April 4, 1913 Kaitō (海東郡) and Kaisai (海西郡), Aichi (Merged to form Ama District)
- February 1, 1918 Muroran District (室蘭郡), Hokkaido (The town of Muroran and the villages of Wanishi, Chimaibetsu, and Motomuroran merged to form the borough (-ku) of Muroran (now the city of Muroran))
- April 1923 Furebetsu District (振別郡), Hokkaido (The village of Furebetsu (振別村) merged with other villages to form the village of Rubetsu in Etorofu)
- April 1, 1925 Higashinari District (東成郡), Osaka (Merged into the city of Osaka)
- April 1, 1925 Nishinari District (西成郡), Osaka (Merged into the city of Osaka)

== 1927~1945 ==
- April 1, 1931 Kii District (紀伊郡), Kyoto (The villages of Kamitoba, Kisshōin, Fukakusa, Shimotoba, Yokoōji, Nōso, Horiuchi, Mukaijima, and Takeda merged into the city of Kyoto)
- October 1, 1932 Ebara District (荏原郡), Tokyo (Merged into the city of Tokyo)
- October 1, 1932 Toyotama District (豊多摩郡), Tokyo (Merged into the city of Tokyo)
- October 1, 1932 Kitatoshima District (北豊島郡), Tokyo (Merged into the city of Tokyo)
- October 1, 1932 Minamiadachi District (南足立郡), Tokyo (Merged into the city of Tokyo)
- October 1, 1932 Minamikatsushika District (南葛飾郡), Tokyo (Merged into the city of Tokyo)
- October 1, 1936 Kuraki District (久良岐郡), Kanagawa (The town of Kanazawa and the village of Mutsuurashō merged into the city of Yokohama)
- October 1, 1938 Tachibana District (橘樹郡), Kanagawa (The villages of Mukaigaoka, Miyasaki, the town of Inada, and the village of Ikuta merged into the city of Kawasaki)
- April 1, 1939 Tsuzuki District (都筑郡), Kanagawa (The village of Nitta, the town of Kawara, and the villages of Yamauchi, Nakasato, Nakagawa, Tana, Niiharu, Tsuoka, and Futamatagawa merged into the city of Yokohama; the villages of Kakioeki and Okagami merged into the city of Kawasaki)
- September 1, 1940 Otaru District (小樽郡), Hokkaido (The village of Asari merged into the city of Otaru)
- September 1, 1940 Takashima District (高島郡), Hokkaido (The town of Takashima merged into the city of Otaru)

== 1945~1959 ==
- April 1, 1948 Kadono District (葛野郡), Kyoto (The villages of 小野郷 and 中川 merged into the city of Kyoto)
- June 1, 1948 Kamakura District (鎌倉郡), Kanagawa (The town of 大船 merged into the city of Kamakura)
- September 10, 1948 Kiku District (企救郡), Fukuoka (The village of 東谷 merged into the city of Kokura (now the city of Kitakyūshū))
- April 1, 1949 Otagi District (愛宕郡), Kyoto (The villages of 雲ヶ畑, 岩倉, 八瀬, 大原, 静市野, 鞍馬, 花背, and 久多 merged into the city of Kyoto)
- April 1, 1950 Kitakanra District (北甘楽郡), Gunma (Renamed to Kanra District)
- January 1, 1951 Akashi District (明石郡), Hyōgo (The town of 大久保 and the village of 魚住 merged into the city of Akashi)
- March 1, 1951 Uji District (宇治郡), Kyoto (The town of Higashiuji merged with the towns and villages from Kuse District and granted town status to form the city of Uji)
- April 1, 1954 Himi District (氷見郡), Toyama (The villages of 神代, 仏生寺, 布勢, 十二町, 速川, 久目, 阿尾, 薮田, 宇波, and 女良 merged into the city of Himi)
- April 1, 1954 Muko District (武庫郡), Hyōgo (The village of 良元 merged into the city of Takarazuka)
- April 1, 1954 Ano District (安濃郡), Shimane (The villages of 佐比売, 朝山, and 富山 split and merged into the city of Ōda and the town of Tagi, Hikawa District (now the city of Izumo))
- October 17, 1954 Nishiyamanashi District (西山梨郡), Yamanashi (The villages of 山城, 住吉, 朝井, 玉諸, 甲運, 能泉, and 千代田 merged into the city of Kōfu)
- January 15, 1955 Utasutsu District (歌棄郡), Hokkaido (The village of Utasutsu merged into the town of Suttsu, Suttsu District; the village of Neppu merged with the village of Kuromatsunai and parts of the village of Tarukishi from Suttsu District to form the village of Sanwa (now the town of Kuromatsunai))
- January 15, 1955 Tsuruga District (敦賀郡), Fukui (The villages of 東浦, 東郷, 中郷, 愛発, and 粟野 merged into the city of Tsuruga)
- April 1, 1955 Futoru District (太櫓郡), Hokkaido (The village of Futoru merged with the town of Tōsetana, Setana District to form the town of Kitahiyama)
- September 30, 1956 Bikuni District (美国郡), Hokkaido (The town of Bikuni merged into the town of Shakotan, Shakotan District)
- September 30, 1956 Yana District (八名郡), Aichi (The village of Yamayoshida merged into the town of Hōrai, Minamishitara District)
- September 30, 1956 Kawage (河芸郡) and Ano (安濃郡) Districts, Mie (Merged to form Age District)
- September 30, 1956 Ikaruga District (何鹿郡), Kyoto (The village of Saga split and merged into the cities of Ayabe and Fukuchiyama)
- March 21, 1957 Minamimurayama District (南村山郡), Yamagata (The village of Yamamoto merged into the city of Kaminoyama)
- August 1, 1957 Nemuro District (根室郡), Hokkaido (The town of Nemuro and the village of Wada merged to form the city of Nemuro)
- March 31, 1958 Minamikatsuragi District (南葛城郡), Nara (The town of Gose and the villages of Kuzu, Taishō, and Katsujō merged and granted city status to form the city of Gose)
- April 1, 1958 Oshiyoro District (忍路郡), Hokkaido (The village of Shioya merged into the city of Otaru)
- April 1, 1958 Minamiokitama District (南置賜郡), Yamagata (The village of Nakatsugawa merged into the town of Iide, Nishiokitama District)
- July 1, 1958 Arima District (有馬郡), Hyōgo (The town of Sanda granted city status to become the city of Sanda)
- October 1, 1958 Nakakawachi District (中河内郡), Osaka (The town of Kashiwara granted city status to become the city of Kashiwara)
- November 3, 1958 Esashi District (江刺郡), Iwate (The town of Esashi granted city status to become the city of Esashi)
- January 1, 1959 Uchi District (宇智郡), Nara (The village of Minamiuchi merged into the city of Gojō)
- April 1, 1959 Hanasaki District (花咲郡), Hokkaido (The village of Habomai merged into the city of Nemuro)
- April 1, 1959 Nii District (新居郡), Ehime (The town of Sumino merged into the city of Niihama)
- September 30, 1959 Minamikuwada District (南桑田郡), Kyoto (The village of merged into the city of Kameoka)

== 1960~1988 ==
- October 1, 1962 Ashikaga District (足利郡), Tochigi (The towns of Mikuriya and Sakanishi merged into the city of Ashikaga)
- April 1, 1963 Inaba District (稲葉郡), Gifu (The towns of Sohara, Naka, Inaha, and Unuma merged to form the city of Kakamigahara)
- May 1, 1965 Asaka District (安積郡), Fukushima (The towns of Asaka, Hiwada, Fukuyama, Atami, and the villages of Mihota, Ouse, Katahira, Kikuta, and Konan merged into the city of Kōriyama)
- October 1, 1966 Iwaki District (石城郡), Fukushima (The towns of Yotsukura, Ogawa, Tōno, the villages of Kawamae, Miwa, Yoshima, Tabito, 2 towns and villages from Futaba District, and the cities of Taira, Jōban, Iwaki, Nakoso, and Uchigō merged to form the city of Iwaki)
- January 1, 1967 Chiba District (千葉郡), Chiba (The town of Yachiyo gained city status to become the city of Yachiyo)
- April 1, 1967 Kasai District (加西郡), Hyōgo (The towns of Hōjō, Kasai, and Izumi merged to form the city of Kasai)
- October 1, 1967 Ichihara District (市原郡), Chiba (The town of Nansō and the village of Kamo merged into the city of Ichihara)
- May 1, 1968 Nishichikuma District (西筑摩郡), Nagano (Renamed to Kiso District (木曽郡))
- October 1, 1968 Shinobu District (信夫郡), Fukushima (The town of Azuma merged into the city of Fukushima)
- January 1, 1969 Abe District (安倍郡), Shizuoka (The villages of Ōkōchi, Umegashima, Tamakawa, Ikawa, Kiyosawa, and Ōkawa merged into the city of Shizuoka)
- April 1, 1969 Suki (周吉郡), Ōchi District (穏地郡), Ama (海士郡), and Chibu (知夫郡) Districts, Shimane (Merged to form Oki District)
- August 1, 1970 Yoribetsu District (幌別郡), Hokkaido (The town of Noboribetsu gained city status to become the city of Noboribetsu)
- November 1, 1970 Chitose District (千歳郡), Hokkaido (The town of Eniwa gained city status to become the city of Eniwa)
- November 3, 1970 Kitatama District (北多摩郡), Tokyo (The town of Murayama gained city status to become the city of Musashimurayama)
- December 1, 1970 Higashikasugai District (東春日井郡), Aichi (The town of Asahi gained city status to become the city of Owariasahi)
- December 1, 1970 Hekikai District (碧海郡), Aichi (The town of Takahama gained town status to become the city of Takahama, the town of Chiryū gained city status to become the city of Chiryū)
- May 1, 1971 Jōdō District (上道郡), Okayama (The town of Jōdō merged into the city of Okayama)
- November 1, 1971 Minamitama District (南多摩郡), Tokyo (The town of Tama gained city status to become the city of Tama and the town of Inagi gained city status to become the city of Inagi)
- November 3, 1971 Kitakawachi District (北河内郡), Osaka (The town of Katano gained city status to become the city of Katano)
- April 1, 1972 Soo District (囎唹郡), Kagoshima (renamed to Soo District (曽於郡))
- March 20, 1973 Asa District (安佐郡), Hiroshima (The towns of Yasufuruichi, Satō, and Kōyō merged into the city of Hiroshima)
- March 1, 1975 Sawara District (早良郡), Fukuoka (The town of Sawara merged into the city of Fukuoka)
- February 1, 1979 Innan District (印南郡), Hyōgo (The town of Shikata merged into the city of Kakogawa)
- March 1, 1988 Natori District (名取郡), Miyagi (The town of Akiu merged into the city of Sendai)

== 1989~1998 ==
- February 1, 1991 Hōtaku District (飽託郡), Kumamoto (The towns of Hokubu, Kawachi, Akita, and Tenmei merged into the city of Kumamoto)
- April 1, 1991 Kimitsu District (君津郡), Chiba (The town of Sodegaura gained city status to become the city of Sodegaura)
- September 1, 1996 Sapporo District (札幌郡), Hokkaido (The town of Hiroshima gained city status to become the city of Kitahiroshima)

== 1999~2004 ==
- April 1, 1999 Taki District (多紀郡), Hyōgo (The towns of Sasayama, Nishiki, Tannan, and Konda merged to form the city of Sasayama)
- October 1, 2001 Kurita District (栗太郡), Shiga (The town of Rittō gained city status to become the city of Rittō)
- February 3, 2003 Ashina District (芦品郡), Hiroshima (The town of Shinichi merged into the city of Fukuyama)
- April 1, 2003 Yamagata District (山県郡), Gifu (The town of Takatomi, the village of Ijira, and the town of Miyama merged to become the city of Yamagata)
- April 1, 2003 Ōkawa District (大川郡), Kagawa (The towns of Hiketa, Shirotori, and Ōchi merged to form the city of Higashikagawa)
- April 21, 2003 Tsuno District (都濃郡), Yamaguchi (The town of Kano merged with the cities of Tokuyama, Shinnanyō, and the town of Kumage from Kumage District to form the city of Shūnan)
- March 1, 2004 Sado District (佐渡郡), Niigata (the towns of Aikawa, Kanai, Sawata, Hatano, Mano, Hamochi and Ogi; and the villages of Niibo, and Akadomari merged with the city of Ryōtsu to form the city of Sado)
- March 1, 2004 Gujō District (郡上郡), Gifu (The towns of Hachiman, Yamato, Shirotori, and the villages of Takasu, Minami, Meihō, and Wara merged to form the city of Gujō)
- March 1, 2004 Mashita District (益田郡), Gifu (The towns of Hagiwara, Osaka, Gero, Kanayama, and the village of Maze merged to form the city of Gero)
- March 1, 2004 Takata District (高田郡), Hiroshima (The towns of Yoshida, Yachiyo, Midori, Takamiya, Kōda, and Mukaihara merged to form the city of Akitakata)
- March 1, 2004 Iki District (壱岐郡), Nagasaki (The towns of Gōnoura, Katsumoto, Ashibe, and Ishida merged to form the city of Iki)
- March 1, 2004 Shimoagata District (下県郡), Nagasaki (The towns of Izuhara, Mitsushima, and Toyotama merged with three towns from Kamiagata District to form the city of Tsushima)
- March 1, 2004 Kamiagata District (上県郡), Nagasaki (The towns of Mine, Kamiagata, and Kamitsushima merged with three towns from Shimoagata District to form the city of Tsushima)
- April 1, 2004 Naka District (中郡), Kyoto (The towns of Mineyama and Ōmiya and other 2 districts 4 towns merged to form the city of Kyōtango)
- April 1, 2004 Takeno District (竹野郡), Kyoto (The towns of Amino, Takeno, Yasaka and the other 2 districts 3 towns merged to form the city of Kyōtango)
- April 1, 2004 Kumano District (熊野郡), Kyoto (The town of Kumihama and the other 2 districts 5 towns merged to form the city of Kyōtango)
- April 1, 2004 Yabu District (養父郡), Hyōgo (The towns of Yōka, Yabu, Ōya, and Sekinomiya merged to form the city of Yabu)
- April 1, 2004 Futami District (双三郡), Hiroshima (The towns of Kisa, Mirasaka, Miwa, and the villages of Sakugi, Kimita, and Funo merged with the city of Miyoshi and the town of Kōnu from Kōnu District to form the city of Miyoshi)
- April 1, 2004 Uma District (宇摩郡), Ehime (The town of Doi, the village of Shingū, and the cities of Iyomishima and Kawanoe merged to form the city of Shikokuchūō)
- April 1, 2004 Higashiuwa District (東宇和郡), Ehime (The towns of Akehama, Uwa, Nomura, Shirokawa, and Mikame from Nishiuwa District merged to form the city of Seiyo)
- October 1, 2004 Shima District (志摩郡), Mie (The towns of Hamajima, Daiō, Ago, Shima, and Isobe merged to form the city of Shima)
- October 1, 2004 Yasu District (野洲郡), Shiga (The towns of Chūzu and Yasu merged to form the city of Yasu)
- October 1, 2004 Kōka District (甲賀郡), Shiga (The towns of Ishibe and Kosei merged to form the city of Konan; The towns of Minakuchi, Tsuchiyama, Kōka, Kōnan, and Shigaraki merged to form the city of Kōka)
- October 1, 2004 Nogi District (能義郡), Shimane (The towns of Hirose and Hakuta merged with the city of Yasugi to form the city of Yasugi)
- October 1, 2004 Kawakami District (川上郡), Okayama (The town of Nariwa, Kawakami, and Bitchū merged with the city of Takahashi and the town of Ukan from Jōbō District to form the city of Takahashi)
- October 1, 2004 Oe District (麻植郡), Tokushima (The towns of Kamoshima, Kawashima, Yamakawa, and the village of Misato merged to form the city of Yoshinogawa)
- November 1, 2004 Kitaaizu District (北会津郡), Fukushima (The village of Kitaaizu merged into the city of Aizuwakamatsu)
- November 1, 2004 Taga District (多賀郡), Ibaraki (The town of Jūō merged into the city of Hitachi)
- November 1, 2004 Higashitonami District (東礪波郡), Toyama (The town of Shogawa and the city of Tonami merged to form the city of Tonami; the town of Jōhana, the villages of Taira, Kamitaira, Toga, the town of Inami, the village of Inokuchi, and the town of Fukuno merged with the town of Fukumitsu from Nishitonami District to form the city of Nanto)
- November 1, 2004 Ayama District (阿山郡), Mie (The town of Iga, the village of Shimagahara, the town of Ayama, and the village of Ōyamada merged with the city of Ueno and the town of Aoyama in Naga District to form the city of Iga)
- November 1, 2004 Naga District (名賀郡), Mie (The town of Aoyama and the city of Ueno and 4 towns and villages from Ayama District merged to form the city of Iga)
- November 1, 2004 Hikami District (氷上郡), Hyōgo (The towns of Kaibara, Hikami, Aogaki, Kasuga, Sannan, and Ichijima merged to form the city of Tamba)
- November 1, 2004 Ketaka District (気高郡), Tottori (The towns of Ketaka, Shikano, and Aoya merged into the city of Tottori)
- November 1, 2004 Mino District (美濃郡), Shimane (The towns of Mito and Hikimi merged into the city of Masuda)
- November 1, 2004 Ohara District (大原郡), Shimane (The towns of Daitō, Kamo, and Kisuki merged with three towns from Iishi District to form the city of Unnan)
- November 1, 2004 Oku District (邑久郡), Okayama (The towns of Ushimado, Oku, and Osafune merged to form the city of Setouchi)
- November 1, 2004 Shūsō District (周桑郡), Ehime (The towns of Komatsu and Tanbara and the cities of Saijō and Tōyo merged to form the city of Saijō)

== 2005 ==
January 1, 2005

- Sarashina District (更級郡), Nagano (The village of Ooka merged into the city of Nagano)
- Iinan District (飯南郡), Mie (The towns of Iinan and Iitaka merged with the city of Matsusaka and two towns from Ichishi District to form the city of Matsusaka)
- Takashima District (高島郡), Shiga (The towns of Adogawa, Imazu, Shinasahi, Takashima, Makino, and the village of Kutsuki merged to form the city of Takashima)
- Onsen District (温泉郡), Ehime (The town of Nakajima merged into the city of Matsuyama)
- Kitaamabe District (北海部郡), Ōita (The town of Saganoseki merged into the city of Ōita)

January 11, 2005

- Kawabe District (河辺郡), Akita (The towns of Kawabe and merged into the city of Akita)
- Suzuka District (鈴鹿郡), Mie (The town of Seki and the city of Kameyama merged to form the city of Kameyama)
- Mihara District (三原郡), Hyōgo (The towns of Midori, Seidan, Mihara, and Nandan merged to form the city of Minamiawaji)
- Uto District (宇土郡), Kumamoto (The towns of Misumi and Shiranuhi merged with three towns from Shimomashiki District to form the city of Uki)

February 1, 2005

- Yoshiki District (吉城郡), Gifu (The town of Kokufu and the village of Kamitakara merged into the city of Takayama)
- Numakuma District (沼隈郡), Hiroshima (The town of Numakuma merged into the city of Fukuyama)

February 7, 2005

- Mugi District (武儀郡), Gifu (The towns of Mugi, Mugegawa, and the villages of Horado, Kaminoho, and Itadori merged into the city of Seki)

February 13, 2005

- Ena District (恵那郡), Gifu (The town of Sakashita, the villages of Kawaue, Kashimo, the towns of Tsukechi, Fukuoka, and the village of Hirukawa merged into the city of Nakatsugawa)
- Toyoura District (豊浦郡), Yamaguchi (The towns of Kikukawa, Toyota, Toyoura, and Hōhoku merged with the city of Shimonoseki to form the city of Shimonoseki)

February 28, 2005

- Aso District (安蘇郡), Tochigi (The towns Kuzu and Tanuma merged with the city of Sano to form the city of Sano)

March 1, 2005

- Fugeshi (鳳至郡) and Suzu (珠洲郡) Districts, Ishikawa (Merged to form Hōsu District)
- Shitsuki District (後月郡), Okayama (The town of Yoshii merged into the city of Ibara)
- Ogi District (小城郡), Saga (The towns of Ogi, Ashikari, Ushizu, and Mikatsuki merged to form the city of Ogi)
- Kitatakaki District (北高来郡), Nagasaki (The towns of Iimori, Konagai, Takaki, and Moriyama merged with the town of Tarami from Nishisonogi District and the city of Isahaya to form the city of Isahaya)
- Shimoge District (下毛郡), Ōita (The towns of Honyabakei, Yabakei, Yamakuni, and the village of Sankō merged into the city of Nakatsu)

March 3, 2005

- Minamiamabe District (南海部郡), Ōita (The towns of Ume, Kamae, Kamiura, Tsurumi, Yayoi, and the villages of Naokawa, Honjo, and Yonoutsu merged with the city of Saiki to form the city of Saiki)

March 19, 2005

- Nishikubiki District (西頸城郡), Niigata (The towns of Nose and Oume and the city of Itoigawa merged to form the city of Itoigawa)

March 20, 2005

- Ukiha District (浮羽郡), Fukuoka (The towns of Ukiha and Yoshii merged to form the city of Ukiha)

March 22, 2005

- Kojima District (児島郡), Okayama (The town of Nadasaki merged into the city of Okayama)
- Kamo District (賀茂郡), Hiroshima (The town of Yamato merged with the town of Hongo from Toyota District, the town of Kui from Mitsugi District, and the city of Mihara to form the city of Mihara)
- Asa District (厚狭郡), Yamaguchi (The town of San'yō merged with the city of Onoda to form the city of San'yō-Onoda)
- Ōtsu District (大津郡), Yamaguchi (The towns of Heki, Yuya, and Misumi merged with the city of Nagato to form the city of Nagato)
- Hita District (日田郡), Ōita (The villages of Maetsue, Nakatsue, Kamitsue, and the towns of Ōyama and Amagase merged into the city of Hita)

March 28, 2005

- Higashikatsushika District (東葛飾郡), Chiba (The town of Shonan merged into the city of Kashiwa)
- Kaizu District (海津郡), Gifu (The towns of Hirata, Nanno, and Kaizu merged to form the city of Kaizu)
- Mitsugi District (御調郡), Hiroshima (The town of Mitsugi and Mukaishima merged into the city of Onomichi)
- Munakata District (宗像郡), Fukuoka (The village of Ōshima merged into the city of Munakata)

March 31, 2005

- Atetsu District (阿哲郡), Okayama (The towns of Ōsa, Shingō, Tetta, and Tessei merged with the city of Niimi to form the city of Niimi)
- Jōbō District (上房郡), Okayama (The town of Hokubō merged with 8 towns and villages from Maniwa District to form the city of Maniwa)
- Kōnu District (甲奴郡), Hiroshima (The town of Sōryō merged with 5 towns from Hiba District and the city of Shōbara to form the city of Shōbara)
- Hiba District (比婆郡), Hiroshima (The towns of Saijō, Tōjō, Kuchiwa, Takano and Hiwa merged with the town of Sōryō from Kōnu District and the city of Shōbara to form the city of Shōbara)
- Usa District (宇佐郡), Ōita (The towns of Innai and Ajimu merged with the city of Usa to form the city of Usa)
- Ōno District (大野郡), Ōita (The town of Mie, The village of Kiyokawa, the towns of Ogata, Asaji, Ōno, the village of Chitose, and the town of Inukai merged to form the city of Bungo-ōno)

April 1, 2005

- Kurihara District (栗原郡), Miyagi (The towns of Ichihasama, Uguisuzawa, Kannari, Kurikoma, Shiwahime, Semine, Takashimizu, Tsukidate, Wakayanagi, and the village of Hanayama merged to form the city of Kurihara)
- Tome District (登米郡), Miyagi (The towns of Ishikoshi, Towa, Toyosato, Toyoma, Nakada, Hasama, Minamikata, and Yoneyama merged with the town of Tsuyama from Motoyoshi District to form the city of Tome)
- Monou District (桃生郡), Miyagi (The towns of Yamoto and Naruse merged to form the city of Higashimatsushima; the towns of Kahoku, Ogatsu, Kanan, Monou, and Kitakami merged with the town of Oshika from Oshika District and the city of Ishinomaki to form the city of Ishinomaki)
- Koshi District (古志郡), Niigata (The village of Yamakoshi merged into the city of Nagaoka)
- Higashikubiki District (東頸城郡), Niigata (The towns of Matsudai and Matsunoyama merged with the city of Tōkamachi and 2 towns and villages from Nakauonuma District to form the city of Tōkamachi)
- Nakakubiki District (中頸城郡), Niigata (The town of Myōkōkōgen and the village of Myōkō merged into the city of Arai to become the city of Myōkō)
- Kaminiikawa District (上新川郡), Toyama (The towns of Ōsawano and Ōyama merged with 4 towns and villages from Nei District and the city of Toyama to form the city of Toyama)
- Nei District (婦負郡), Toyama (The towns of Yatsuo, Fuchu, and the villages of Yamada and Hosoiri merged with two towns from Kaminiikawa District and the city of Toyama to form the city of Toyama)
- Ogasa District (小笠郡), Shizuoka (The towns of Ōsuga and Daitō merged with the city of Kakegawa to form the city of Kakegawa)
- Haguri District (葉栗郡), Aichi (The town of Kisogawa merged into the city of Ichinomiya)
- Nakashima District (中島郡), Aichi (The towns of Sofue and Heiwa merged into the city of Inazawa)
- Higashikamo District (東加茂郡), Aichi (The town of Asuke, the village of Shimoyama, and the towns of Asahi and Inabu merged into the city of Toyota)
- Asago District (朝来郡), Hyōgo (The towns of Ikuno, Wadayama, Santo, and Asago merged to form the city of Asago)
- Kinosaki District (城崎郡), Hyōgo (The towns of Kinosaki, Takeno, and Hidaka merged with 2 towns from Izushi District and the city of Toyooka to form the city of Toyooka; the town of Kasumi merged with the towns of Muraoka and Mikata from Mikata District to form the town of Kami in Mikata District)
- Izushi District (出石郡), Hyōgo (The towns of Izushi and Tantō merged with 3 towns from Kinosaki District and the city of Toyooka to form the city of Toyooka)
- Soekami District (添上郡), Nara (The village of Tsukigase merged into the city of Nara)
- Awa District (阿波郡), Tokushima (The towns of Awa and Ichiba merged with 2 towns from Itano District to form the city of Awa)
- Naoiri District (直入郡), Ōita (The towns of Ogi, Kujū, and Naoiri merged with the city of Taketa to form the city of Taketa)

July 1, 2005

- Kaijo District (海上郡), Chiba (The towns of Iioka and Unakami merged with the town of Hikata from Katori District and the city of Asahi to form the city of Asahi)
- Inasa District (引佐郡), Shizuoka (The towns of Inasa, Hosoe, and Mikkabi merged into the city of Hamamatsu)
- Iwata District (磐田郡), Shizuoka (The towns of Sakuma, Misakubo, and the village of Tatsuyama merged into the city of Hamamatsu)

August 1, 2005

- Kibi District (吉備郡), Okayama (The town of Mabi merged into the city of Kurashiki)

September 2, 2005

- Namegata District (行方郡), Ibaraki (The towns of Asou, Kitaura, and Tamatsukuri merged to form the city of Namegata)

October 1, 2005

- Atsuta District (厚田郡), Hokkaido (The village of Atsuta merged into the city of Ishikari)
- Hamamasu District (浜益郡), Hokkaido (The village of Hamamasu merged into the city of Ishikari)
- Hiraka District (平鹿郡), Akita (The towns of Masuda, Hiraka, Omonogawa, Ōmori, Jumonji, and the villages of Sannai and Taiyū merged with the city of Yokote to form the city of Yokote)
- Yuri District (由利郡), Akita (The towns of Nikaho, Konoura, and Kisakata merged to form the city of Nikaho)
- Nishitagawa District (西田川郡), Yamagata (The town of Atsumi merged with 4 towns and villages from Higashitagawa District and the city of Tsuruoka to form the city of Tsuruoka)
- Makabe District (真壁郡), Ibaraki (The town of Makabe and the village of Yamato merged with the town of Iwase from Nishiibaraki District to form the city of Sakuragawa)
- Enuma District (江沼郡), Ishikawa (The town of Yamanaka merged with the city of Kaga to form the city of Kaga)
- Minamiazumi District (南安曇郡), Nagano (The towns of Toyoshina and Hotaka, and the villages of Misato and Horigane merged with the towns of Akashina from Higashichikuma District to form the city of Azumino)
- Minamishitara District (南設楽郡), Aichi (The town of Horai and Tsukude merged with the city of Shinshiro to form the city of Shinshiro)
- Atsumi District (渥美郡), Aichi (The town of Atsumi merged into the city of Tahara)
- Sakata District (坂田郡), Shiga (The town of Ōmi merged into the city of Maibara)
- Naka District (那賀郡), Shimane (The towns of Kanagi, Asahi, the village of Yasaka, and the town of Misumi merged with the city of Hamada to form the city of Hamada)
- Nima District (邇摩郡), Shimane (The towns of Yunotsu and Nima merged with the city of Ōda to form the city of Ōda)
- Saba District (佐波郡), Yamaguchi (The town of Tokuji merged with three towns from Yoshiki District and the city of Yamaguchi to form the city of Yamaguchi)
- Yoshiki District (吉敷郡), Yamaguchi (The towns of Aio, Ogori, and Ajisu merged with the town of Tokuji from Saba District and the city of Yamaguchi to form the city of Yamaguchi)
- Nishikunisaki District (西国東郡), Ōita (The village of Ōta merged with the town of Yamaga from Hayami District and the city of Kitsuki to form the city of Kitsuki)
- Ōita District (大分郡), Ōita (The towns of Yufuin, Shōnai, and Hasama merged to form the city of Yufu)

October 11, 2005

- Kashima District (鹿島郡), Ibaraki (The village of Asahi, the town of Hokota, and the village of Taiyō merged to form the city of Hokota)

October 24, 2005

- Mino District (美嚢郡), Hyōgo (The town of Yokawa merged into the city of Miki)

November 1, 2005

- Higashiyamanashi District (東山梨郡), Yamanashi (The town of Katsunuma and the village of Yamato merged with the city of Enzan to form the city of Kōshū)
- Imizu District (射水郡), Toyama (The towns of Kosugi, Daimon, Ōshima, and the village of Shimo merged with the city of Shinminato to form the city of Imizu)
- Nishitonami District (西礪波郡), Toyama (The town of Fukuoka merged with the city of Takaoka to form the city of Takaoka)

November 3, 2005

- Saeki District (佐伯郡), Hiroshima (The towns of Ōno and Miyajima merged into the city of Hatsukaichi)

November 7, 2005

- Ōno District (大野郡), Fukui (The village of Izumi merged into the city of Ōno)
- Hioki District (日置郡), Kagoshima (The town of Kinpō merged with the city of Kaseda and three towns from Kawanabe District to form the city of Minamisatsuma)

== 2006~ ==
January 1, 2006

- Hienuki District (稗貫郡), Iwate (The towns of Ōhasama and Ishidoriya merged with the town of Tōwa from Waga District and the city of Hanamaki to form the city of Hanamaki)
- Nakakanbara District (中蒲原郡), Niigata (The town of Muramatsu merged with the city of Gosen to form the city of Gosen)
- Age District (安芸郡), Mie (The towns of Kawage, Geinō, Anō, and the village of Misato merged with the 4 towns and villages from Ichishi District and the cities of Hisai and Tsu to form the city of Tsu)
- Ichishi District (一志郡), Mie (The towns of Ichishi, Karasu, Hakusan, and the village of Misugi merged with 4 towns and village from Age District and the cities of Hisai and Tsu to form the city of Tsu)
- Kanzaki District (神崎郡), Shiga (The town of Notogawa merged into the city of Higashiōmi)
- Amata District (天田郡), Kyoto (The towns of Miwa and Yakuno merged into the city of Fukuchiyama)
- Kasa District (加佐郡), Kyoto (The town of Ōe merged into the city of Fukuchiyama)
- Kitakuwada District (北桑田郡), Kyoto (The town of Miyama merged with 3 towns from Funai District to form the city of Nantan)
- Mitoyo District (三豊郡), Kagawa (The towns of Takase, Yamamoto, Mino, Toyonaka, Takuma, Nio, and Saita merged to form the city of Mitoyo)

January 23, 2006

- Toki District (土岐郡), Gifu (The town of Kasahara merged into the city of Tajimi)

February 1, 2006

- Asuwa District (足羽郡), Fukui (The town of Miyama merged into the city of Fukui)

February 11, 2006

- Tsuna District (津名郡), Hyōgo (The town of Goshiki merged with the city of Sumoto to form the city of Sumoto)

March 1, 2006

- Fukayasu District (深安郡), Hiroshima (The town of Kannabe merged into the city of Fukuyama)
- Kami District (香美郡), Kōchi (The towns of Tosayamada and Kahoku and the village of Monobe merged to form the city of Kami; the towns of Akaoka, Kagami, Noichi, and Yasu and the village of Yoshikawa merged to form the city of Kōnan)

March 3, 2006

- Onyū District (遠敷郡), Fukui (The village of Natasho merged with the town of Ōi from Ōi District to form the town of Ōi in Ōi District)

March 15, 2006

- Kitakoma District (北巨摩郡), Yamanashi (The town of Kobuchisawa merged into the city of Hokuto)

March 18, 2006

- Usui District (碓氷郡), Gunma (The town of Matsuida merged with the city of Annaka to form the city of Annaka)

March 19, 2006

- Nishiibaraki District (西茨城郡), Ibaraki (The towns of Tomobe and Iwama merged with the city of Kasama to form the city of Kasama)

March 20, 2006

- Sakai District (坂井郡), Fukui (The towns of Sakai, Mikuni, Maruoka, and Harue merged to form the city of Sakai)
- Shiga District (滋賀郡), Shiga (The town of Shiga merged into the city of Ōtsu)
- Katō District (加東郡), Hyōgo (The towns of Yashiro, Takino, and Tōjō merged to form the city of Katō)

March 27, 2006

- Niihari District (新治郡), Ibaraki (The village of Tamari merged with the towns of Ogawa and Minori from Higashiibaraki District to form the city of Omitama)
- Tsukuba District (筑波郡), Ibaraki (The town of Ina and the village of Yawara merged to form the city of Tsukubamirai)
- Nitta District (新田郡), Gunma (The town of Kasakake merged with the town of Omama from Yamada District and the village of Azuma from Seta District to form the city of Midori)
- Yamada District (山田郡), Gunma (The town of Omama merged with the town of Kasakake from Nitta District and the village of Azuma from Seta District to form the city of Midori)
- Sōsa District (匝瑳郡), Chiba (The town of Hikari merged with the town of Yokoshiba from Sanbu District to form the town of Yokoshibahikari in Sanbu District)
- Shisō District (宍粟郡), Hyōgo (The town of Yasutomi merged into the city of Himeji)
- Shikama District (飾磨郡), Hyōgo (The towns of Ieshima and Yumesaki merged into the city of Himeji)

March 31, 2006

- Shizunai (静内郡) and Mitsuishi (三石郡) Districts, Hokkaido (Merged to form Hidaka District (日高郡))
- Shida District (志田郡), Miyagi (The towns of Sanbongi, Matsuyama, and Kashimadai merged with two towns from Tamatsukuri District, the town of Tajiri from Tōda District, and the city of Furukawa to form the city of Ōsaki)
- Tamatsukuri District (玉造郡), Miyagi (The towns of Iwadeyama and Naruko merged with three towns from Shida District, the town of Tajiri from Tōda District, and the city of Furukawa to form the city of Ōsaki)
- Minamitakaki District (南高来郡), Nagasaki (The towns of Kazusa, Kuchinotsu, Minamiarima, Kitaarima, Nishiarie, Arie, Futsu, and Fukae merged to form the city of Minamishimabara)

April 1, 2006

- Naga District (那賀郡), Wakayama (The town of Iwade gained city status to become the city of Iwade)

August 1, 2006

- Higashiyatsushiro District (東八代郡), Yamanashi (The village of Ashigawa merged into the city of Fuefuki)

October 1, 2006

- Gunma District (群馬郡), Gunma (The town of Haruna merged into the city of Takasaki)

January 22, 2007

- Mitsu District (御津郡), Okayama (The town of Takebe merged into the city of Okayama)
- Akaiwa District (赤磐郡), Okayama (The town of Seto merged into the city of Okayama)

January 29, 2007

- Yamato District (山門郡), Fukuoka (The towns of Setaka and Yamakawa merged with the town of Takata from Miike District to form the city of Miyama)
- Miike District (三池郡), Fukuoka (The town of Takata merged with the towns of Yamakawa and Setaka from Yamato District to form the city of Miyama)

March 11, 2007

- Tsukui District (津久井郡), Kanagawa (The towns of Shiroyama and Fujino merged into the city of Sagamihara)

October 1, 2007

- Saga District (佐賀郡), Saga (The towns of Kawasoe, Kubota, and Higashiyoga merged into the city of Saga)

December 1, 2007

- Kawanabe District (川辺郡), Kagoshima (The towns of Kawanabe and Chiran merged with the town of Ei from Ibusuki District to form the city of Minamikyūshū)
- Ibusuki District (揖宿郡), Kagoshima (The town of Ei merged with the towns of Kawanabe and Chiran from Kawanabe District to form the city of Minamikyūshū)

March 21, 2008

- Mine District (美祢郡), Yamaguchi (The towns of Mitō and Shūhō merged with the city of Mine to form the city of Mine)

November 1, 2008

- Ihara District (庵原郡), Shizuoka (The town of Yui merged into the city of Shizuoka, the town of Fujikawa merged into the city of Fuji)
- Isa District (伊佐郡), Kagoshima (The town of Hishikari merged with the city of Ōkuchi to form the city of Isa)

January 1, 2009

- Shida District (志太郡), Shizuoka (The town of Okabe merged into the city of Fujieda)

March 30, 2009

- Minaminaka District (南那珂郡), Miyazaki (The towns of Kitagō and Nangō merged with the city of Nichinan to form the city of Nichinan)

May 5, 2009

- Seta District (勢多郡), Gunma (The village of Fujimi merged into the city of Maebashi)

January 1, 2010

- Higashiazai District (東浅井郡), Shiga (The towns of Torahime and Kohoku merged into the city of Nagahama)
- Ika District (伊香郡), Shiga (The towns of Takatsuki, Kinomoto, Yogo, and Nishiazai merged into the city of Nagahama)
- Itoshima District (糸島郡), Fukuoka (The towns of Nijō and Shima merged with the city of Maebaru to form the city of Itoshima)

January 4, 2010

- Nishikamo District (西加茂郡), Aichi (The town of Miyoshi become the city of Miyoshi)

February 1, 2010

- Hoi District (宝飯郡), Aichi (The town of Kozakai merged into the city of Toyokawa)

March 23, 2010

- Kitasaitama District (北埼玉郡), Saitama (The towns of Kisai, Kitakawabe, and Ōtone merged with the city of Kazo to form the city of Kazo)
- Fuji District (富士郡), Shizuoka (The town of Shibakawa merged into the city of Fujinomiya)
- Hamana District (浜名郡), Shizuoka (The town of Arai merged into the city of Kosai)
- Kamoto District (鹿本郡), Kumamoto (The town of Ueki merged into the city of Kumamoto)
- Miyazaki District (宮崎郡), Miyazaki (The town of Kiyotake merged into the city of Miyazaki)

March 31, 2010

- Kitauonuma District (北魚沼郡), Niigata (The town of Kawaguchi merged into the city of Nagaoka)

April 1, 2011

- Hazu District (幡豆郡), Aichi (The towns of Hazu, Isshiki and Kira merged into the city of Nishio)

August 1, 2011

- Yatsuka District (八束郡), Shimane (The town of Higashiizumo merged into the city of Matsue)

September 26, 2011

- Higashiiwai District (東磐井郡), Iwate (The town of Fujisawa merged into the city of Ichinoseki)

October 1, 2011

- Kamitsuga District (上都賀郡), Tochigi (The town of Nishikata merged into the city of Tochigi)
- Hikawa District (簸川郡), Shimane (The town of Hikawa merged into the city of Izumo)

November 11, 2011

- Ishikawa District (石川郡), Ishikawa (The town of Nonoichi become the city of Nonoichi)

October 1, 2018

- Chikushi District (筑紫郡), Fukuoka (The town of Nakagawa become the city of Nakagawa)

== See also ==
- List of dissolved municipalities of Japan
