= Shōnan, Chiba =

Shōnan 沼南町
- Former municipality
- Flag
- Interactive map of Shōnan
- Country: Japan
- Region: Kantō
- Prefecture: Chiba Prefecture
- District: Higashikatsushika
- Merged: March 28, 2005 (now part of Kashiwa)

Area
  - Total: 41.99 km^{2} (16.21 sq mi)

Population (April 2005)
  - Total: 46,875
  - Density: 1,116/km^{2} (2,890/sq mi)
- Time zone: UTC+09:00 (JST)
- Symbols
- Flower: Sunflower
- Tree: Castanopsis

Shōnan (沼南町, Shōnan-machi) was a town located in Higashikatsushika District, Chiba Prefecture, Japan.

== History ==
On April 1, 1889 the villages of Kazahaya and Tega were established within the district of Minamisōma District, Chiba. On April 1, 1897, Minamisōma District merged with Higashikatsushika District. Shōnan Village was formed on March 30, 1955. through the merger of Kazahaya and Tega. On February 1, 1964 Shōnan was elevated to town status.

On March 28, 2005, Shōnan was merged into the expanded city of Kashiwa, and thus no longer exists as an independent municipality.

== Population ==
In April 2005 (the last data available before its merger into Kashiwa), the town had an estimated population of 46,875 and a population density of 1116 persons per km^{2}. Its total area was 41.99 km^{2}.
