= Mutsu-kuni =

Mutsu-kuni may refer to:

- Mutsu Province (陸奥国) in modern-day Aomori, Iwate, Miyagi, Fukushima Prefectures and part of Akita Prefecture until 1868
- Mutsu Province (1868) (a.k.a. Rikuō Province (陸奥国)) in modern-day Aomori Prefecture
