= Kōichi Hamada (politician) =

Japanese politician (1928–2012)

- 浜田 幸一
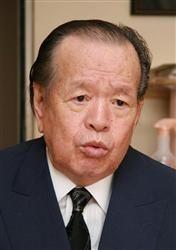

Member of the House of Representatives
- In office 18 December 1983 – 18 June 1993
- Preceded by: Atsushi Ikeda
- Succeeded by: Yasukazu Hamada
- Constituency: Chiba 3rd
- In office 27 December 1969 – 11 April 1980
- Preceded by: Kiyoshi Jitsukawa
- Succeeded by: Chūji Yoshiura
- Constituency: Chiba 3rd

Member of the Chiba Prefectural Assembly
- In office 1963–1969
- Constituency: Kimitsu District

Personal details
- Born: 5 September 1928 Kimitsu, Chiba, Japan
- Died: 5 August 2012 (aged 83) Futtsu, Chiba, Japan
- Party: Liberal Democratic
- Children: Yasukazu Hamada

Kōichi Hamada (浜田 幸一, Hamada Kōichi; 5 September 1928 – 5 August 2012) was a Japanese politician who served in the House of Representatives from 1969 to 1980 and from 1983 to 1993.

A member of the Liberal Democratic Party, he often drew attention for his unrestrained statements and actions. After his retirement from politics he was active as a television personality.

== Early life ==
Kōichi Hamada was born on 5 September 1928, in Aohori in the Kimitsu District of Chiba Prefecture. Hamada enrolled at Nihon University in 1945, but soon dropped out.

Hamada became involved with the Yakuza in the early post-war period. In 1952 he was convicted of assault and embezzlement and served time in prison. By the time of his release his old gang had been absorbed by the Inagawa-gumi. The boss Kakuji Inagawa advised Hamada to not pursue a criminal career. When Hamada expressed an interest in politics, Inagawa introduced him to the right-wing fixer Yoshio Kodama.

Hamada lived in the house of Yoshio Kodama as a servant and secretary for several years. Hamada was also a leader in local youth organisations in Chiba Prefecture. He was elected to the Futtsu Town Council in 1955 and the Chiba Prefectural Assembly in 1963. While serving as a prefectural assemblyman he meet the businessman Kenji Osano through Kodama. For a time he also served as a secretary to the LDP faction boss Shojiro Kawashima.

== Member of the House of Representatives ==
In the December 1969 House of Representatives election, Hamada was elected as a LDP candidate in Chiba 3rd district. Hamada joined the Kawashima faction, but was also associated with Kakuei Tanaka. Hamada became director of the LDP youth division in December 1972. In July 1973 he took part in the formation of the Seirankai, a cross-factional right-wing group, along with Ichiro Nakagawa, Shintaro Ishihara, Michio Watanabe and others. Hamada became secretary general of the Seirankai.

Hamada ceased to be youth director when he became parliamentary vice minister of Agriculture under the Miki Cabinet. He also served as parliamentary vice minister of Defence under the Fukuda Cabinet. The Seirankai fell apart in early 1979 and his old faction also broke apart in September of the same year. Hamada remained without faction afterwards, but developed a strong relationship with Shin Kanemaru.

During the intraparty "40-day war" which followed the October 1979 election, Hamada sided with incumbent Prime Minister Masayoshi Ohira. In an incident that was caught on national television, Hamada kicked down barricades which non-mainstream LDP members had built to prevent a party meeting from renewing confidence in the prime minister. Hamada was appointed chief of the LDP National Movement Headquarters in November.

During the trial of Kenji Osano in connection to the Lockheed bribery scandals in March 1980, it was revealed that Hamada had lost almost two million American dollars playing baccarat in Las Vegas in October 1972. Hamada's debts had been partially covered by Osano. Since this incident was used by the opposition to attack the Ohira administration, Hamada resigned as a Diet member the following month. During his time as a political rōnin he served as a bodyguard to Kanemaru.

Hamada was reelected in December 1983. Upon his reelection he became chairman of the Construction Committee in the House of Representatives and served as such for a year. In 1987 Hamada became chairman of the Budget Committee. In February the following year Hamada accused Japan Communist Party Chairman Kenji Miyamoto of being a murderer during a committee deliberation. This referred to an incident in 1933, when an alleged police informant in the Communist Party had been found dead after interrogation by Miyamoto and others. Hamada's comments caused the communists and other opposition parties to boycott deliberations. This led to Hamada resigning as chairman.

After Toshiki Kaifu became LDP president in August 1989, Hamada was appointed chairman of the LDP public relations committee. He didn't run in the 1993 election, handing over his position to his son Yasukazu Hamada, who had been his secretary since 1984, and retiring from politics.

== Later years ==
In December 1993, Hamada released a book entitled Nine Politicians Who Ruined Japan, containing many stories from his time as a politician, as well as condemnations against both opposition and LDP politicians. The book became a bestseller. After that, Hamada became active as a television personality and frequently appeared on variety shows.

Kōichi Hamada died of heart failure on 5 August 2012, at the age of 83, in his hometown Aohori, now part of Futtsu in Chiba Prefecture.

House of Representatives (Japan)
Preceded by Hikaru Matsunaga	Chairman of the Construction Committee; 1983–1984	Succeeded by Okiharu Yasuoka
Preceded by Shigetami Sunada	Chairman of the Budget Committee; 1987–1988	Succeeded by Keiwa Okuda
Party political offices
Preceded by Takeo Nishioka	Director of the Youth Division, Liberal Democratic Party; 1972–1976	Succeeded by Takashi Fukaya
Preceded by Hikaru Matsunaga	Chairman of the Public Relations Committee, Liberal Democratic Party; 1989–1993	Succeeded by Kaoru Yosano
