= Nishiyamanashi District, Yamanashi =

Former district in Yamanashi prefecture, Japan

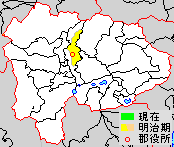
Map showing original extent of Nishiyamanashi District in Yamanashi Prefecture: * yellow - areas formerly within the district borders during the early Meiji period

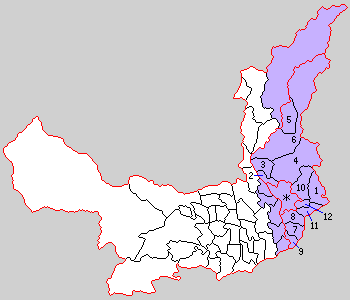
Colored areas are in this district.

Nishiyamanashi (西山梨郡, Nishiyamanashi-gun) was a district located in Yamanashi Prefecture, Japan.

== History ==
Historically, the district formerly included most of the current city of Kōfu.

=== District Timeline ===
- On October 17, 1954 - The villages of Kinoehaboku (Koun), Noizumi, Chiyoda, Yamashiro, Sumiyoshi, Asai and Tamamoro were absorbed into the city of Kōfu.

== See also ==
- List of dissolved districts of Japan
