= Sekiyado, Chiba =

Sekiyado 関宿町
- Former Town
- Flag Emblem

- Location in Japan
- Coordinates: 36°05′48″N 139°46′49″E
- Country: Japan
- Region: Kantō
- Prefecture: Chiba Prefecture
- District: Higashikatsushika
- Merged: June 6, 2003 (now part of Noda)

Area
  - Total: 23.72 km^{2} (9.16 sq mi)

Population (June 1, 2003)
  - Total: 30,710
  - Density: 1,295/km^{2} (3,350/sq mi)
- Time zone: UTC+09:00 (JST)

Sekiyado (関宿町, Sekiyado-machi) was a town located in Higashikatsushika District, Chiba Prefecture, Japan. Bordered by the Tone River and Ibaraki Prefectureto the east, and the Edo River and Saitama Prefecture on the west, it was formerly the northernmost municipality in Chiba Prefecture.

Sekiyado was a river port and castle town in the Edo period, with Sekiyado Castle as the center of Sekiyado Domain, a feudal han of the Tokugawa shogunate in Shimosa Province. After the Meiji Restoration, the town of Sekiyado was created on April 1, 1889. In border adjustments in 1895 and 1899, it lost portions of its territory to Ibaraki and Saitama Prefectures on the far banks of the Tone River and the Edo River. However, it expanded on July 20, 1955 by annexing the neighboring villages of Futagawa and Kimagase. Some minor border adjustments were made with the neighboring city of Noda in 1961 and 1999.

On June 6, 2003, Sekiyado was merged into the expanded city of Noda and ceased to exist as an independent municipality.

As of June 1, 2003, (the last data from before the merger), Sekiyado had an estimated population of 30,710 and a density of 1295 persons per km^{2}. The total area was 29.82 km^{2}.
