= Nishiazai District, Shiga =

Former district in Shiga prefecture, Japan

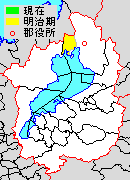
Map of Nishiazai District with Meiji period (1890) area in yellow

Nishiazai (西浅井郡, Nishiazai-gun) was a district located in Shiga Prefecture. The district is equivalent to the town of Nishiazai in Ika District.

== Timeline ==
- 1878 – Azai District splits into Nishiazai and Higashiazai Districts.
- April 1, 1889 – Municipal status is enforced. The villages of Shiotsu and Nagahara are formed.
- April 1, 1897 – Nishiazai District merges into Ika District.

== See also ==
- List of dissolved districts of Japan
