= Kaitō District, Aichi =

Japanese district

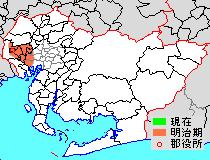
Map showing original extent of Kaisei District in Aichi Prefecture: * yellow - areas formerly within the district borders during the early Meiji period

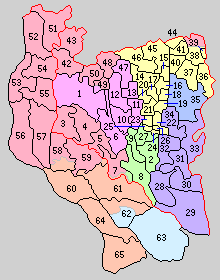
Colored areas are in this district.

Kaitō (海東郡, Kaitō-gun) (a.k.a. East Ama) was a district located in Aichi Prefecture, Japan.

== History ==
=== District Timeline ===
- 1913 - Kaisei and Kaitō Districts were merged to form Ama District. Therefore, both Kaisei and Kaitō Districts were dissolved as a result of this merger.

== See also ==
- List of dissolved districts of Japan
