= Kaisai District, Aichi =

Former district in Aichi prefecture, Japan

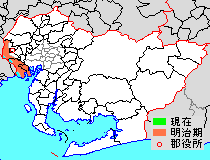
Map showing original extent of Kaisai District in Aichi Prefecture: * yellow - areas formerly within the district borders during the early Meiji period

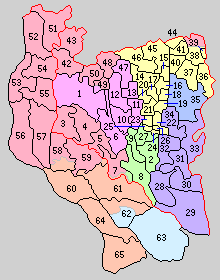
Colored areas are in this district.

Kaisai (海西郡, Kaisai-gun) (a.k.a. West Ama) was a district located in Aichi Prefecture, Japan.

== County Area ==
The county was inaugurated as an administrative district in 1878 and is composed of the following areas:

- Part of Aisai City (Excluding part of Fukuhara Nitta, Motobuda-cho, Tojo-cho, Toho-cho, Nishiho-cho, Yamaji-cho, Jakugamori-cho, Hayao-cho, Akame-cho, Futago-cho, Shimotatsugawa-cho and west)
- Most of Yatomi City (except Zenta-cho, Gomei, Gomei-cho, Kojima-cho, Kawahara-ki, Kaina-kuroji-shinden, Miyoshi, Tomishima, Inarizaki, Tomisaki, Sakaimachi, Einan-cho, and Nakahara)
- All over Tobishima Village, Kaifu-gun
- Part of Komagane, Kaizu-cho, Kaizu-shi, Gifu Prefecture

== History ==
=== District Timeline ===
- 1913 - Kaisai and Kaitō Districts were merged to form Ama District. Therefore, both Kaisai and Kaitō Districts were dissolved as a result of this merger.

== See also ==
- List of dissolved districts of Japan
