= Yasukazu Hamada =

Japanese politician

- 浜田 靖一
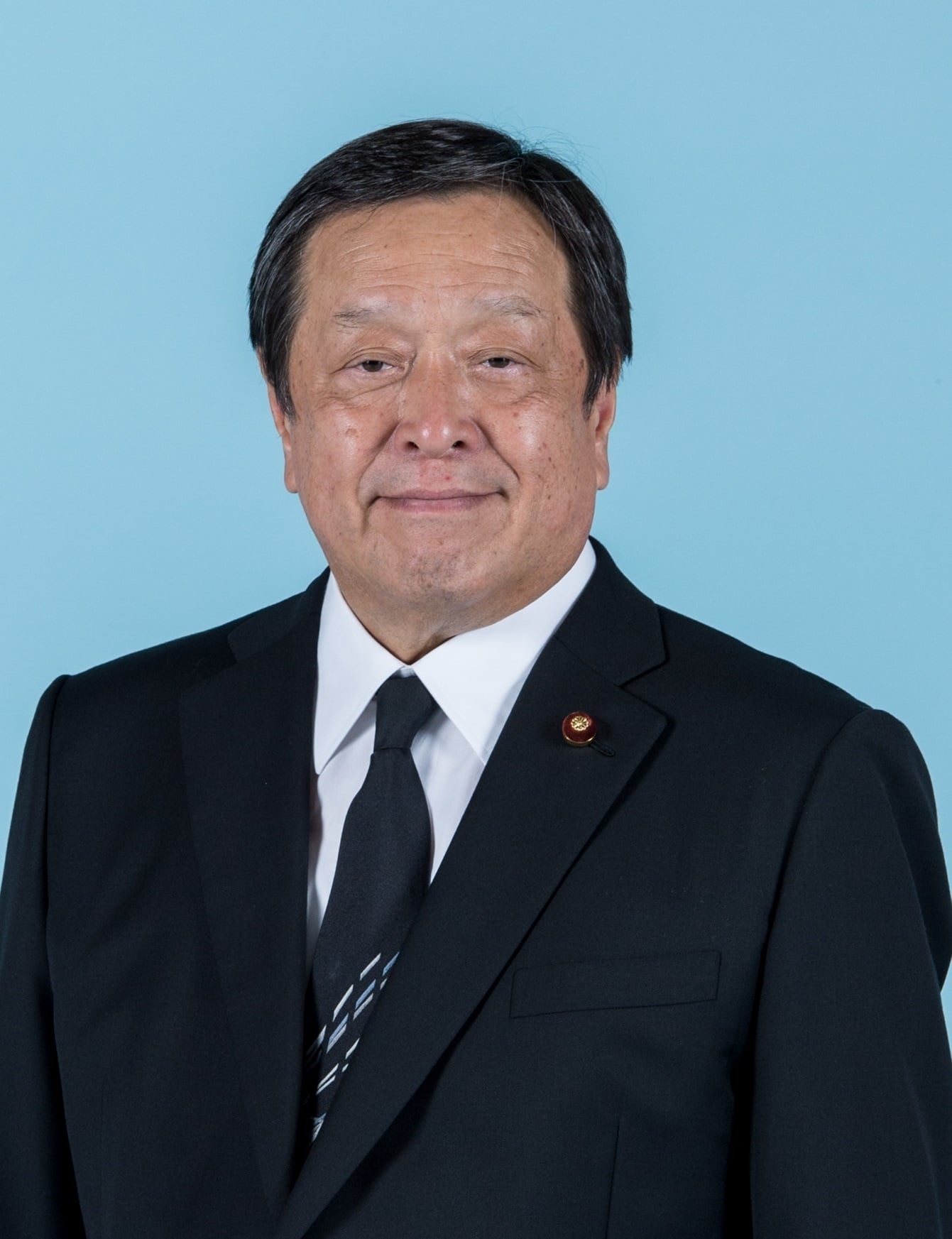
- Official portrait, 2022

Minister of Defense
- In office 10 August 2022 – 13 September 2023
- Prime Minister: Fumio Kishida
- Preceded by: Nobuo Kishi
- Succeeded by: Minoru Kihara
- In office 24 September 2008 – 16 September 2009
- Prime Minister: Tarō Asō
- Preceded by: Yoshimasa Hayashi
- Succeeded by: Toshimi Kitazawa

Member of the House of Representatives; from Southern Kanto
- Incumbent
- Assumed office 18 July 1993
- Preceded by: Kōichi Hamada
- Constituency: Chiba 3rd (1993–1996); Chiba 12th (1996–2000); PR block (2000–2003); Chiba 12th (2003–present)

Personal details
- Born: 21 October 1955 (age 70) Futtsu, Chiba, Japan
- Party: Liberal Democratic
- Parent: Kōichi Hamada (father)
- Education: Senshu University (BBA)

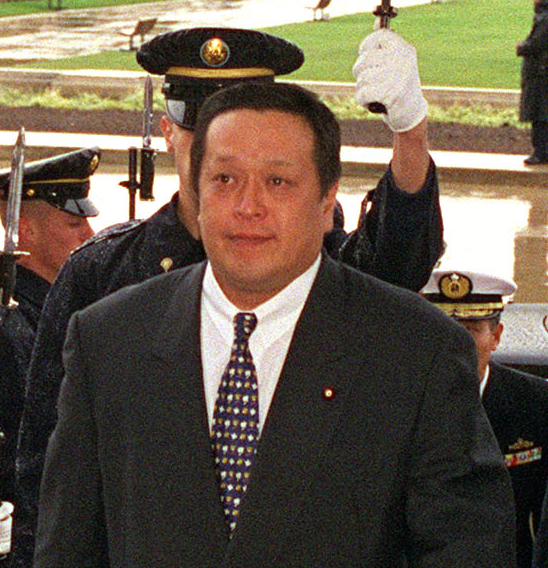
Hamada at the Pentagon, 3 November 1998

Yasukazu Hamada (浜田 靖一, Hamada Yasukazu; born 21 October 1955) is a Japanese politician who served as the Minister of Defense of Japan from 2008 to 2009 and from 2022 to 2023. A member of the Liberal Democratic Party, he also serves in the House of Representatives, having taken office in 1993.

In September 2008, under the Cabinet of Prime Minister Tarō Asō, Hamada was appointed Minister of Defense. This was Hamada's first Cabinet position. He was appointed to the same position under the Cabinet of Prime Minister Fumio Kishida in 2022.

His father, Kōichi Hamada, also served in the House of Representatives.

Political offices
Preceded by Yoshimasa Hayashi	Minister of Defense; 2008–2009	Succeeded by Toshimi Kitazawa
Preceded by Nobuo Kishi	Minister of Defence; 2022–2023	Succeeded by Minoru Kihara
Party political offices
Preceded by Hachiro Okonogi	Director of the Youth Division, Liberal Democratic Party; 1999–2000	Succeeded by Hakubun Shimomura
Preceded by Fumio Kishida	Chairman of the Diet Affairs Committee, Liberal Democratic Party; 2012	Succeeded by Ichiro Kamoshita
Preceded by Tsuyoshi Takagi	Chairman of the Diet Affairs Committee, Liberal Democratic Party; 2023–2024	Succeeded by Tetsushi Sakamoto
House of Representatives (Japan)
Preceded by Kōki Kobayashi	Chairman of the Committee on National Security; 2005–2006	Succeeded by Tarō Kimura
Preceded by Ichiro Aisawa	Chairman of the Committee on Fundamental National Policies; 2016	Succeeded by Yasufumi Tanahashi
Preceded by Wataru Takeshita	Chairman of the Budget Committee; 2016–2017	Succeeded by Takeo Kawamura
Preceded by Fukushiro Nukaga	Chairman of the Board of Intelligence Oversight and Review; 2018–2020	Succeeded by Hirokazu Matsuno
Preceded by Eisuke Mori	Chairman of the Committee on Fundamental National Policies; 2020–2021	Succeeded by Kisaburo Tokai
Preceded by Itsunori Onodera	Chairman of the Board of Intelligence Oversight and Review; 2023–2024	Succeeded by Takeshi Iwaya
Preceded by Shunichi Yamaguchi	Chairman of the Committee on Rules and Administration; 2024–2026	Succeeded by Shunichi Yamaguchi
