= Higashi-Katsushika District, Chiba =

Former district in Chiba prefecture, Japan

Higashi-Katsushika (東葛飾郡, Higashi-Katsushika-gun) was a district located in Chiba Prefecture, Japan until March 27, 2005.

On March 28, 2005 the district was dissolved when the town of Shōnan was merged into the expanded city of Kashiwa.

== Area ==
The Higashi-Katsushika District (April 1, 1897 – March 28, 2005) is now covering the following cities:

- The following cities was part of this district at the time of founding:
  - Urayasu, Ichikawa, Matsudo, Nagareyama, Noda, Kamagaya, large parts of Funabashi, Kashiwa (Former municipalities of Kashiwa, Tanaka, Tsuchi, and Kogane areas)
- The following cities was part of Minamisōma District (1889-April 1, 1897):
  - Abiko, Kashiwa (Former towns of Shōnan and Tomise areas)

== History ==
Katsushika District, of the Musashi Province was broke off by their respective prefectures and thus Higashi-Katsushika District was placed within Chiba Prefecture. The seat was located in Matsudo.

In 1897, Minamisōma District (Broke off from Sōma District in Kazusa Province by their respective prefectures and Minamisōma was placed in Chiba Prefecture) was later absorbed into Higashi-Katsushika District.

After the one and the only town in Higashi-Katsushika District, Shōnan was merged into the city of Kashiwa on March 28, 2005, the district dissolved. But the region covering the former district is now known as the Tokatsu Region (東葛地域).

=== Timeline ===
- April 1, 1897 - The district absorbed Minamisōma District.
- September 1, 1909 - The village of Urayasu was elevated to town status. (12 towns, 31 villages)
- October 10, 1914 (12 towns, 29 villages)
  - The villages of Chiyoda and Toyoshiki were merged to create the village of Chiyoda.
  - The villages of Tanaka and Toyofuta were merged to create the village of Tanaka.
- August 10, 1924 - The village of Nakayama was elevated to town status. (13 towns, 28 villages)
- September 15, 1926 - The village of Chiyoda was elevated to town status and was renamed to Kashiwa. (14 towns, 27 villages)
- January 1, 1931 - The village of Katsushika was elevated to town status. (15 towns, 26 villages)
- April 1, 1933 - The town of Matsudo, and the village of Mei were merged to create the town of Matsudo. (15 towns, 25 villages)
- November 3, 1934 - The towns of Ichikawa, Yawata, Nakayama, and the village of Kokubun were merged to create the city of Ichikawa. (12 towns, 24 villages)
- April 1, 1937 - The towns of Funabashi and Katsushika, and the villages of Yasaka, Hoden, and Tsukada were merged to create the city of Funabashi. (10 towns, 21 villages)
- April 15, 1937 - The village of Minamigyotoku was elevated to town status. (11 towns, 20 villages)
- April 1, 1938 - The village of Yabashira was merged into the town of Matsudo. (11 towns, 19 villages)
- April 1, 1943 - The town of Matsudo, and the villages of Mabashi and Takagi were merged to create the city of Matsudo. (10 towns, 17 villages)
- November 3, 1949 - The village of Ogashiwa was merged into the city of Ichikawa. (10 towns, 16 villages)
- May 3, 1950 - The town of Noda, and the villages of Asahi, Shichifuku, and Umesato were merged to create the city of Noda. (9 towns, 13 villages)
- April 1, 1951 - The town of Nagareyama, and the villages of Yagi and Shinkawa were merged to creare the town of Edogawa. (9 towns, 11 villages)
- January 1, 1952 - The town of Edogawa was renamed to Nagareyama.
- September 1, 1954 - The towns of Kogane and Kashiwa, and the villages of Tuchi and Tanaka were merged to create the city of Tokatsu. (7 towns, 9 villages)
- November 1, 1954 - The village of Tomise broke off and some of its localities were merged into the town of Abiko and the city of Tokatsu (respectively). (7 towns, 8 villages)
- March 30, 1955 - The villages of Kazahaya and Tega were merged to create the village of Shōnan. (7 towns, 7 villages)
- March 31, 1955 - The town of Gyotoku was merged into the city of Ichikawa. (6 towns, 7 villages)
- April 29, 1955 - The towns of Abiko and Fusa, and the village of Kohoku were merged to create the town of Abiko. (5 towns, 6 villages)
- July 20, 1955 - The town of Sekiyado, and the villages of Kimagase and Futakawa were merged to create the town of Sekido. (5 towns, 4 villages)
- October 1, 1956 - The town of Minamigyotoku was merged into the city of Ichikawa. (4 towns, 4 villages)
- April 1, 1957 - The villages of Fukuda and Kawama were merged into the city of Noba (4 towns, 2 villages)
- August 1, 1958 - The village of Kamagaya was elevated to town status. (5 towns, 1 village)
- February 1, 1964 - The village of Shōnan was elevated to town status. (6 towns)
- January 1, 1967 - The town of Nagareyama was elevated to city status. (5 towns)
- July 1, 1970 - The town of Abiko was elevated to city status. (4 towns)
- September 1, 1971 - The town of Kamagaya was elevated to city status. (3 towns)
- April 1, 1981 - The town of Urayasu was elevated to city status. (2 towns)
- June 6, 2003 - The town of Sekiyado was merged into the expanded city of Noda. (1 town)
- March 28, 2005 - The town of Shōnan was merged into the expanded city of Kashiwa. Higashikatsushika District was dissolved as a result of this merger.

== See also ==
- Katsushika District
  - Nishikatsushika District
  - Minamikatsushika District
  - Kitakatsushika District
  - Nakakatsushika District
