= Ashikaga District, Tochigi =

District in Tochigi prefecture, Japan

Ashikaga District (Japanese: 足利郡) was a district located in Tochigi Prefecture, Japan. It was dissolved in 1962.
