= Kimitsu District, Chiba =

Former district in Chiba prefecture, Japan

Coordinates: 35°23′N 139°55′E

Kimitsu District (君津郡, Kimitsu-gun) was an administrative district in Chiba Prefecture Japan. The district was dissolved April 1, 1991 when the town of Sodegaura gained city status.

== Location ==
Kimitsu District covered the area of the present day cities of Kisarazu, Futtsu, Kimitsu, and Sodegaura.

== History ==
During the early Meiji period establishment of the municipality system in 1878, the districts of Mōda District (望陀郡, Mōda-gun), Sue District (周淮郡, Sue-gun) and Amaha District (天羽郡, Amaha-gun) were created in what was formerly the central-eastern portion of Kazusa Province. The district office for all three of these districts was in the village of Kisarazu. The three districts were formally merged into the new Kimitsu District on April 1, 1897.

As created, Kimitsu District initially consisted of two towns (Kururi and Kisarazu) and 17 villages. The town of Kisarazu merged with the villages of Takene, Kiyokawa, and Namioka to form the city of Kisarazu on November 3, 1942. The towns of Kimitsu and Futtsu gained city status on September 1, 1971. The town of Sodegaura gained city status on April 1, 1991, upon which Kimitsu District creased to exist.

== Geology ==
The area slopes northwestern, presumably due to the presence of Mount Kano with an aquifer in the Miura group.

== See also ==
- List of dissolved districts of Japan
