= Hokubu, Kumamoto =

Dissolved municipality in Kumamoto prefecture, Japan

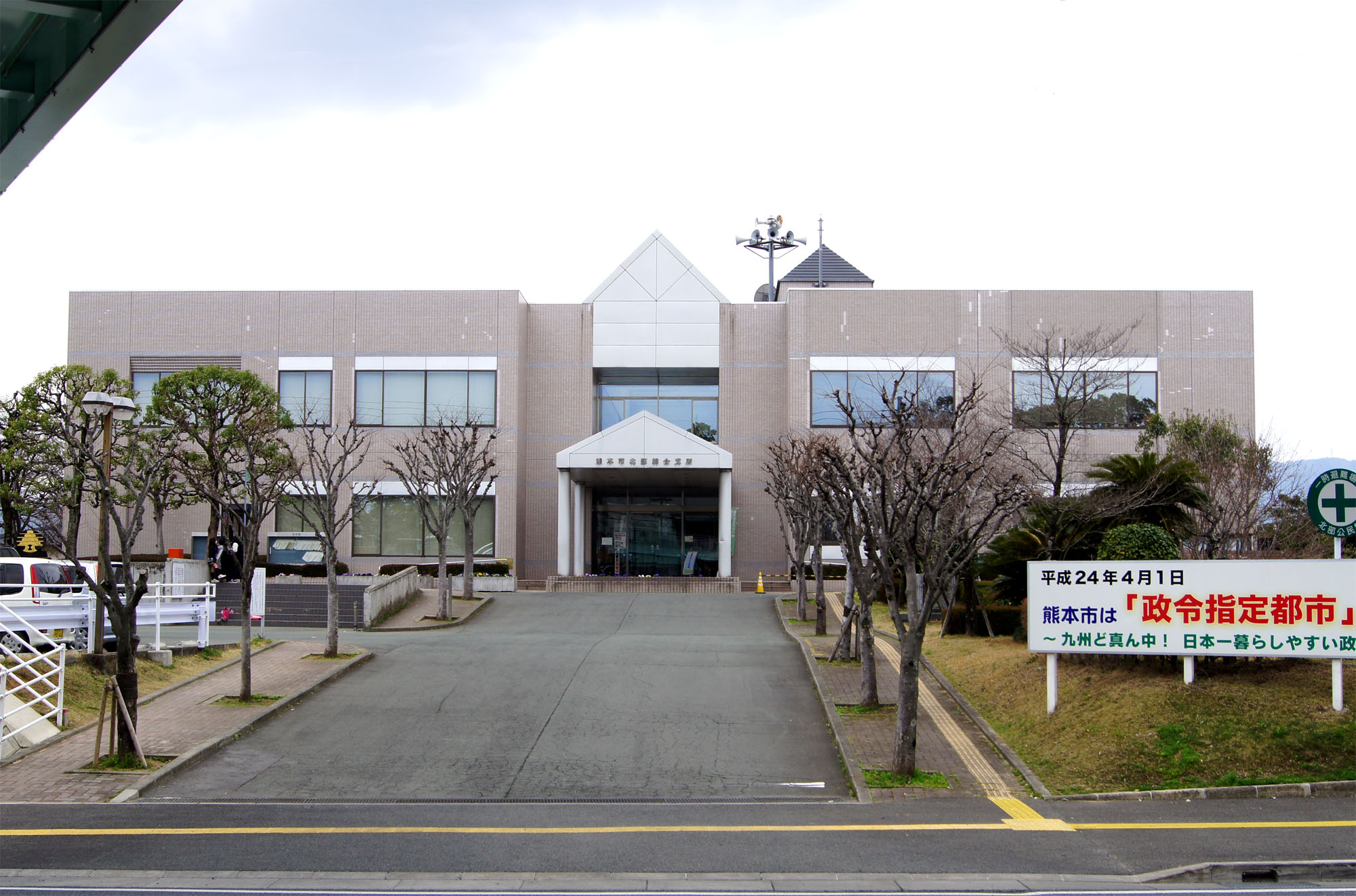
Kumamoto city Kita ward office Hokubu synthesis branch

Hokubu (北部町, Hokubu-machi) was a town located in Hōtaku District, Kumamoto Prefecture, Japan.

On February 1, 1991, Hokubu, along with the towns of Akita, Kawachi and Tenmei (all from Hōtaku District), was merged into the expanded city of Kumamoto and no longer exists as an independent municipality. As of April 1, 2012, the area is part of the Kita-ku ward.
