= Tsugaru District, Mutsu =

Former district in Aomori prefecture, Japan

- List of Provinces of Japan > Tōsandō > Mutsu Province > Tsugaru District
- Japan > Tōhoku region > Aomori Prefecture > Tsugaru District

Tsugaru (津軽郡, Tsugaru-gun) was a district located in the old province of Mutsu, Japan (now in current Aomori Prefecture). The district once had a land in southern Hokkaido but in 1878, the district dissolved by splitting up into 5 districts.

As the Tsugaru Domain, the area was considered a de facto province in its own right, and even today Japan Rail and other local railroad stations prefix Tsugaru- to their names instead of Mutsu- as in stations in the rest of Aomori Prefecture.

== Description ==
- 1664 - Under Tokugawa Shogunate's orders, Tsugaru District's name was visible on the letter published by the shogunate against the Tsugaru Clan's Tsugaru Nobumasa (津軽信政). This order combined Hanawa, Hiraga, and Inaka Districts in the Tsugaru Region.
- 1878 - The district split up into 5 districts, which consisted on the following below.

== See also ==
- Higashitsugaru District (東津軽郡)
- Kitatsugaru District (北津軽郡)
- Minamitsugaru District (南津軽郡)
- Nakatsugaru District (中津軽郡)
- Nishitsugaru District (西津軽郡)
- Tsugaru District, Hokkaido
