= Tenmei, Kumamoto =

Dissolved municipality in Kumamoto prefecture, Japan

Tenmei (天明町, Tenmei-machi) was a town located in Hōtaku District, Kumamoto Prefecture, Japan.

On February 1, 1991, Tenmei, along with the towns of Akita, Hokubu and Kawachi (all from Hōtaku District), was merged into the expanded city of Kumamoto and no longer exists as an independent municipality. As of April 1, 2012, the area is part of the Minami-ku ward.
