= Minamitoshima District =

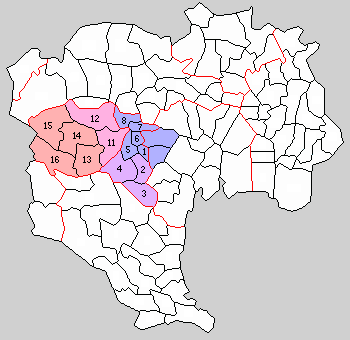
The Southern Toshima (MinamiToshima) and Eastern Tama (HigashiTama) Counties within Tokyo Prefecture in 1889: Minamitoshima-gun: 1. Naitō-Shinjuku-machi; 2. Sendagaya-mura; 3. Shibuya-mura; 4. Yoyohata-mura; 5. Yodobashi-machi; 6. Ōkubo-mura; 7. Totsuka-mura; 8. Ochiai-mura; blue - Shinjuku-ku purple - Shibuya-ku Higashitama-gun: 11. Nakano-mura; 12. Nogata-mura; 13. Wadahori-mura; 14. Suginami-mura; 15. Iogi-machi; 16. Takaido-mura; pink - Nakano-ku red - Suginami-ku

Minamitoshima (南豊島郡, Minamitoshima-gun; South Toshima) was a district (gun) located in Tokyo Prefecture between 1878 and 1896.

In 1878, the Meiji government made the first step to introduce modern administrative divisions on the municipal level: The counties (gun) were created from the pre-modern districts (gun or kōri) with their towns and villages; in addition, 17 cities became districts (ku) and the three capitals (santo) Tokyo, Kyoto and Osaka were each subdivided into several ku. The old Toshima District of Musashi Province was divided into three parts: The Eastern section became the Kanda, Shiba, Azabu, Akasaka, Yotsuya, Ushigome and Koishikawa Districts (and later became wards of Tokyo City when it was created in 1889); and the Western section was divided into two districts: Northern Toshima and Southern Toshima.

In 1889 when the modern cities, towns and villages were set up, small sections of South Toshima were split off and integrated into newly created Tokyo City, the rest was reorganized into eight municipalities:

- the towns of Yodobashi and Naitō-Shinjuku,
- and the villages of Sendagaya, Shibuya, Yoyohata, Ōkubo, Totsuka and Ochiai.

In 1896, Minamitoshima District was merged with Higashitama District to become Toyotama County that eventually disappeared when all its towns and villages were merged into Tokyo City in 1932.

The county/district area roughly corresponded to the present-day special wards of Shibuya but also extended into Shinjuku, Toshima and small section of Minato.
