= Hōtaku District, Kumamoto =

Former district in Kumamoto prefecture, Japan

Hōtaku District (飽託郡, Hōtaku-gun) was a district located in Kumamoto Prefecture, Japan.

== Former towns and villages ==
- Akita
- Kawachi
- Tenmei
- Hokubu

== Merger ==
- On February 1, 1991 - the towns of Akita, Hokubu, Kawachi and Tenmei were merged into the expanded city of Kumamoto. Hōtaku District was dissolved as a result of this merger.
