= Mutsu Province (1868) =

Former province of Japan

Rikuō Province 陸奥国
- Province of Japan
- 1869–1871
- Map of Japanese provinces (1869) with Rikuō Province highlighted
- History
  - Established: 1869
  - Disestablished: 1871
Preceded by
Mutsu Province
Succeeded by
Tonami Prefecture
Shichinohe Prefecture
Hirosaki Prefecture
Kuroshi Prefecture
Hachinohe Prefecture
- Today part of: Iwate Prefecture; Aomori Prefecture

Mutsu Province (陸奥国, Mutsu no Kuni; Japanese pronunciation: [mɯ̈́.t͡sɨ̀ (nò̞ kɯ̈̀.ɲ̟ì)]), officially called Rikuō Province (陸奥国, Rikuō no kuni) was an old province of Japan in the area of Iwate and Aomori prefecture.

It was also known as Ōshū (奥州) or Rikushū (陸州). In the Meiji era, the province was cut down to cover only present-day Aomori and given the new name Rikuō Province, which retained the original kanji.

== History ==
On December 7, 1868 (January 19, 1869 in the Gregorian calendar), four additional provinces (Rikuchū, Rikuzen, Iwaki, and Iwashiro) were separated from Mutsu, leaving only a rump corresponding to today's Aomori Prefecture (with Ninohe District of Iwate Prefecture). At the same time, while the characters of the name were unchanged, the official reading was changed to the on'yomi version "Rikuō".

== Historical districts ==
Mutsu (Rikuō) Province consisted of nine districts:

- Aomori Prefecture
  - Tsugaru District (津軽郡)
    - Higashitsugaru District (東津軽郡)
    - Kitatsugaru District (北津軽郡)
    - Minamitsugaru District (南津軽郡)
    - Nakatsugaru District (中津軽郡)
    - Nishitsugaru District (西津軽郡)
  - Kita District (北郡)
    - Kamikita District (上北郡)
    - Shimokita District (下北郡)
  - Sannohe District (三戸郡)
- Iwate Prefecture
  - Ninohe District (二戸郡)

== See also ==
- Mutsu Province
- Sanriku
- Tōhoku region
- Tōsandō
- Japanese battleship Mutsu, the World War II Imperial Japanese Navy warship named after the province.

== Other websites ==
Media related to Mutsu Province (1868) at Wikimedia Commons

- Murdoch's map of provinces, 1903
- "Mutsu Province". SamuraiWiki.
