= Kawachi, Kumamoto =

Dissolved municipality in Kumamoto prefecture, Japan

Kawachi (河内町, Kawachi-machi) was a town located in Hōtaku District, Kumamoto Prefecture, Japan.

On February 1, 1991, Kawachi, along with the towns of Akita, Hokubu and Tenmei (all from Hōtaku District), was merged into the expanded city of Kumamoto and no longer exists as an independent municipality. As of April 1, 2012, the area is part of the Nishi-ku ward.

Kawachi was the ancestral hometown of Peruvian President Alberto Fujimori (1990-2000). His parents, Naoichi Fujimori (original surname Minami, adopted by a childless relative; 1897–1971) and Mutsue Inomoto Fujimori (1913–2009), immigrated to Peru in 1934. Decades later, Alberto himself made a triumphal visit to the town in July 1990, shortly before taking power after winning the second round of that year's presidential election, in which he defeated famed novelist (and future Nobel Prize in Literature) Mario Vargas Llosa.
