= Akita District =

Region in Japan

Coordinates: 39.760634936024175°N 140.06543420298186°E

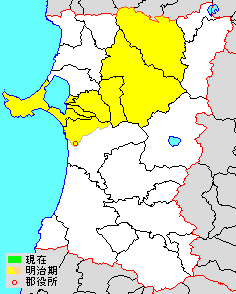
Location of former Akita District in Dewa Province

Akita District (秋田郡, Akita-gun) was a rural district located in Dewa Province, Japan. It was established in 804, and absorbed Hinai District, Mutsu Province in 1590. It was the largest district in Dewa until Akita District was divided into Minamiakita District and Kitaakita District in 1878. The provincial capital was located in Tsuchizaki/Terauchi area and transferred to Kubota, Akita in the 17th century.

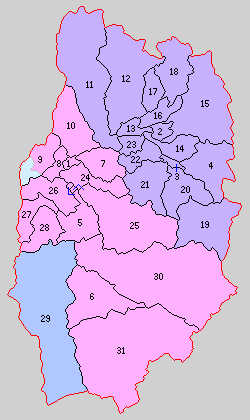
Historic Map of Kitaakita District: Purple - Ōdate-shi: 2. Ōdate; 3. Ogita; 4. Junishō; 11. Hayaguchi; 12. Yamase; 13. Shimokawasoe; 14. Kamikawasoe; 15. Nagaki; 16. Shakanai; 17. Hanaoka; 18. Yatate; 19. Ōkuzo; 20. Higashidate; 21. Nishidate; 22. Niida; 23. Manaka; Light Blue - part of Noshiro-shi: 9. Nanakura (southwest portion); Pink - Kitaakiya-shi: 1. Takanosu; 5. Yonaizawa; 6. Aniai; 7. Sakae; 8. Bōsawa; 9. Nanakura (northeast portion); 10. Tsuzureko; 24. Sawaguchi; 25. Nanukaichi; 26. Ōno; 27. Ochiai; 28. Shimokoani; 30. Maeda; 31. Arasei; Blue - Kamikoani-mura: 29. Kamikoani

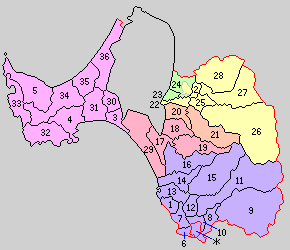
Historic Map of Minamiakita District: Purple: Akita City; Pink: Oga City; Salmon: Katagami City; Yellow: Gojōme Town; Green: Hachirōgata Town; Orange: Ikawa Town; 1. Tsuchizaki Minato; 2. Gojume; 3. Funakoshi; 4. Funakawa; 5. Kitaura; 6. Kawashiri; 7. Terauchi; 8. Hiroyamada; 9. Taihei; 10. Shimo-Asahikawa; 11. Kami-Asahikawa; 12. Soto-Asahikawa; 13. Iijima; 14. Shimo-Shinjo; 15. Kami-Shinjo; 16. Kanaashi; 17. Okubo; 18. Iitagawa; 19. Toyokawa; 20. Shimoikawa; 21. Kamiikawa; 22. Okawa; 23. Hitoichi; 24. Omogata; 25. Magawa; 26. Babame; 27. Futtsunai; 28. Uchikawa; 29. Tenno; 30. Futto; 31. Wakimoto; 32. Minamiiso; 33. Toga; 34. Oganaka; 35. Goriai; 36. Katanishi

== Gallery ==
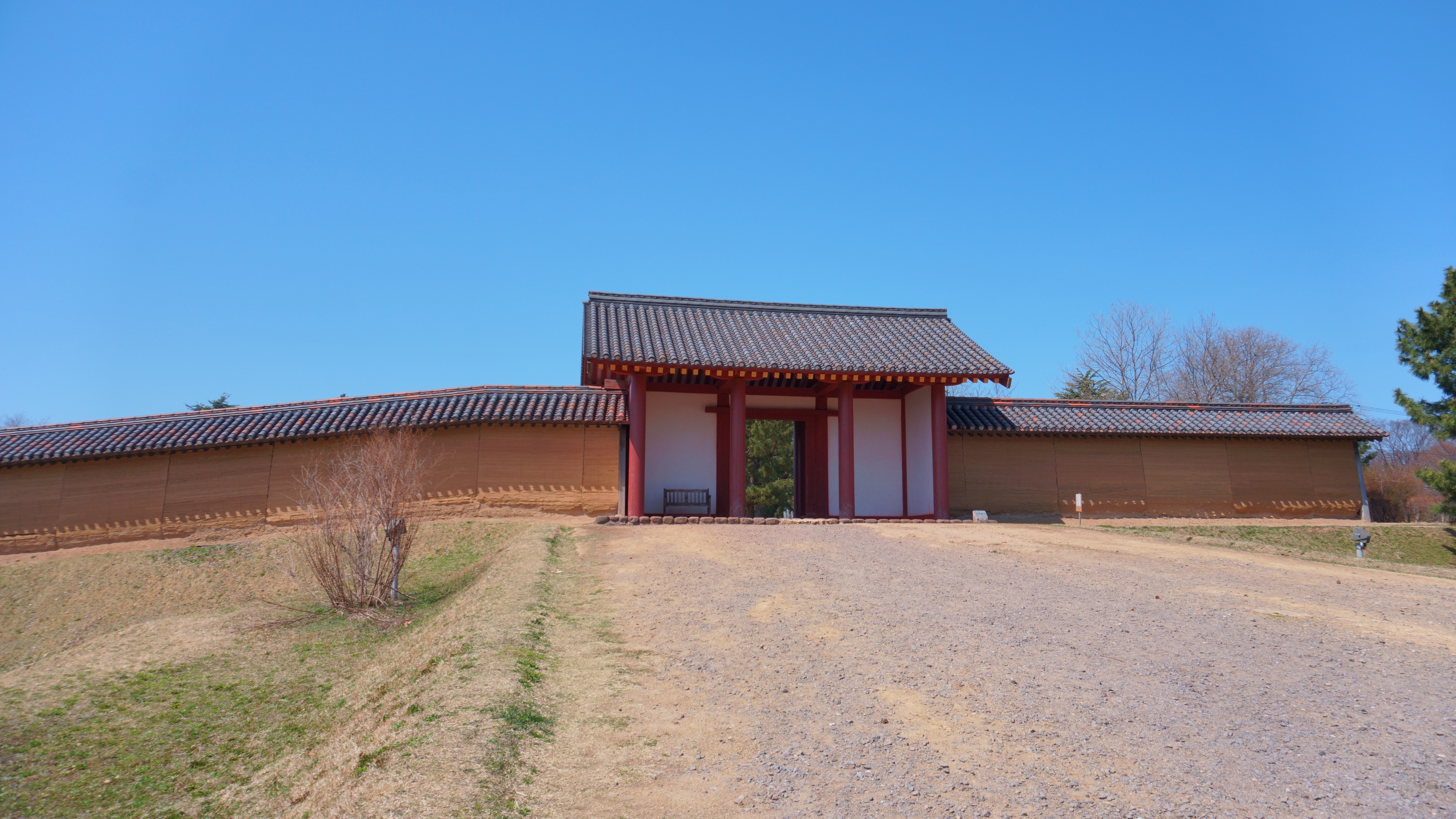
Akita Castle

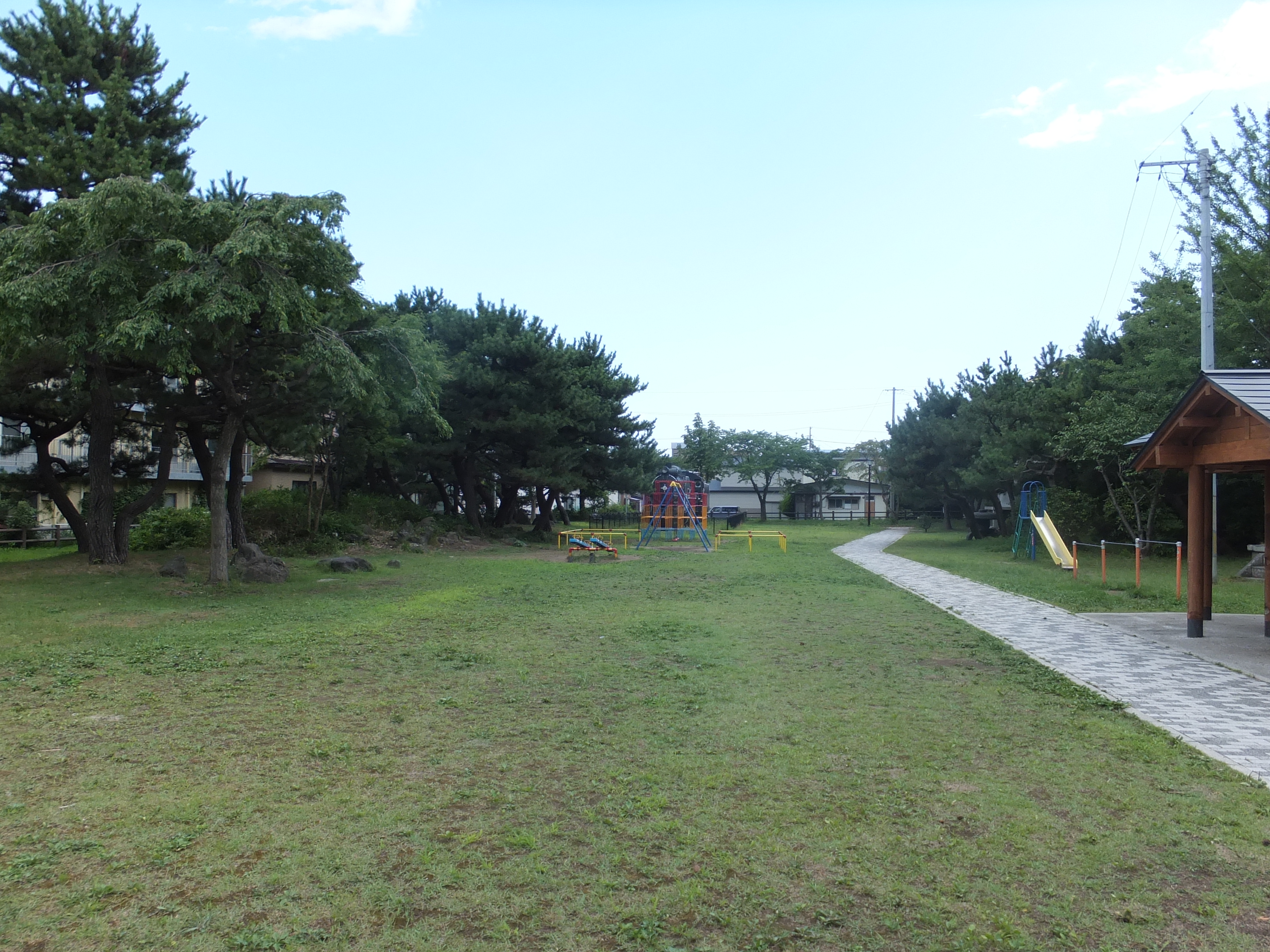
Minato Castle

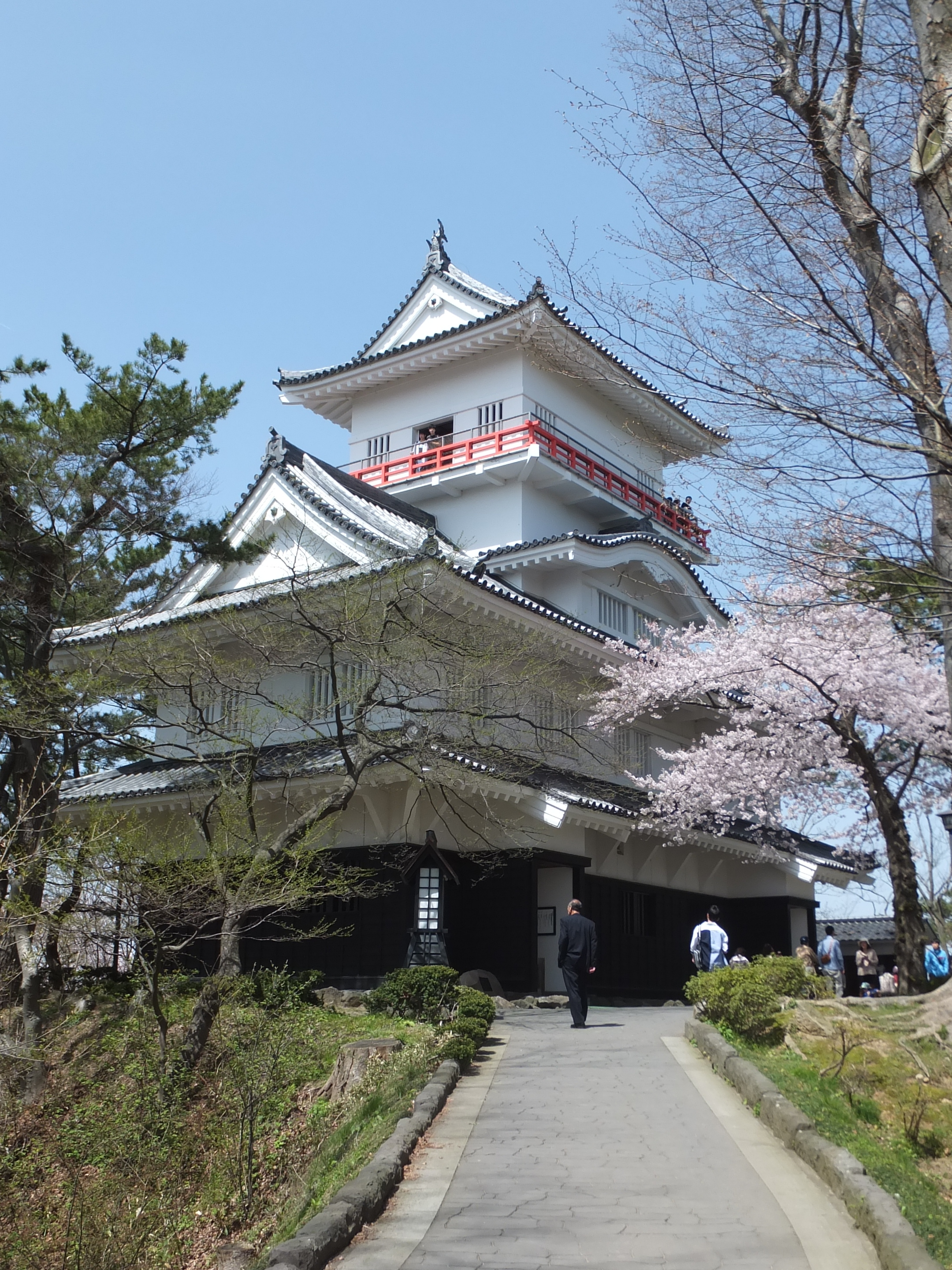
Kubota Castle

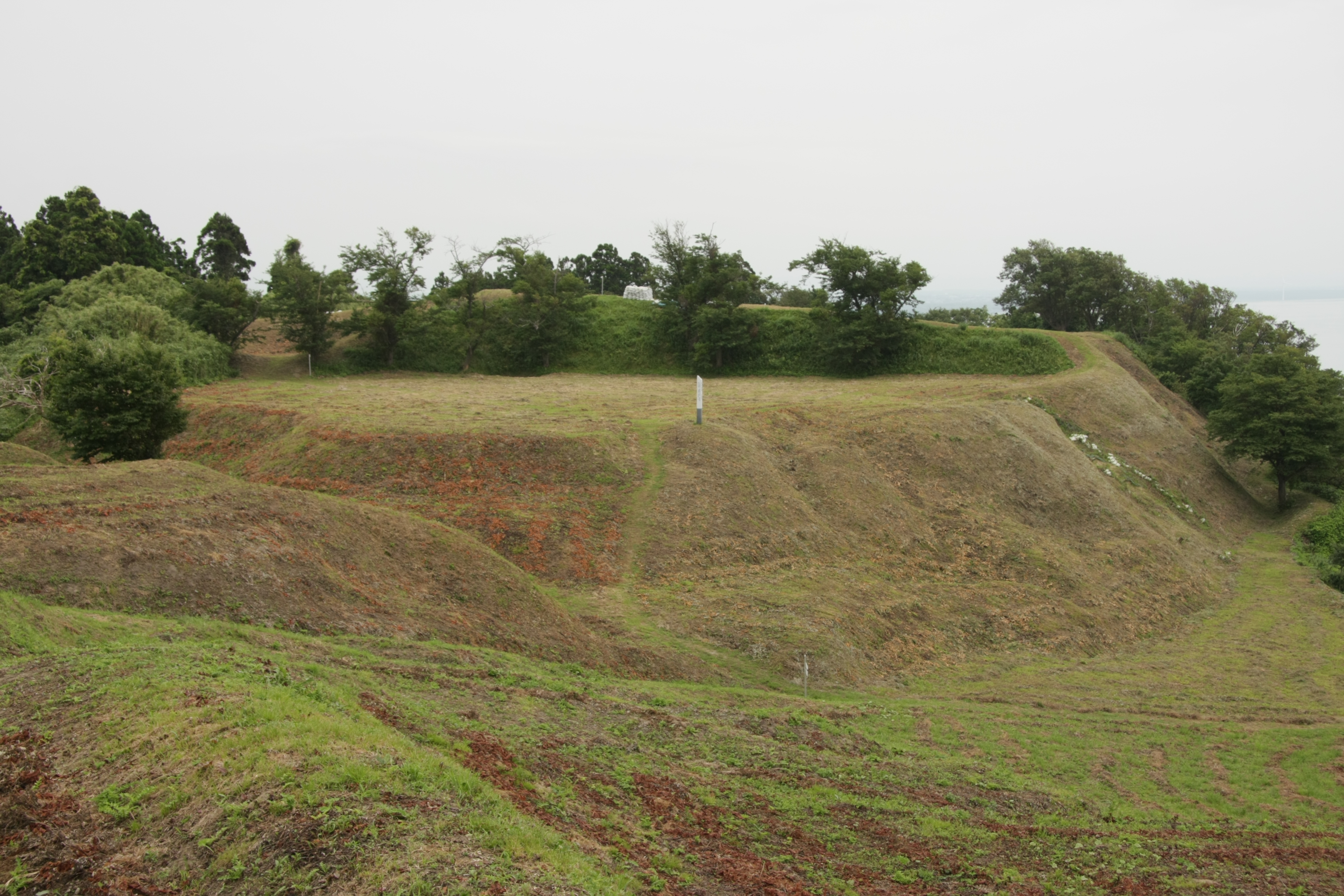
Wakimoto Castle

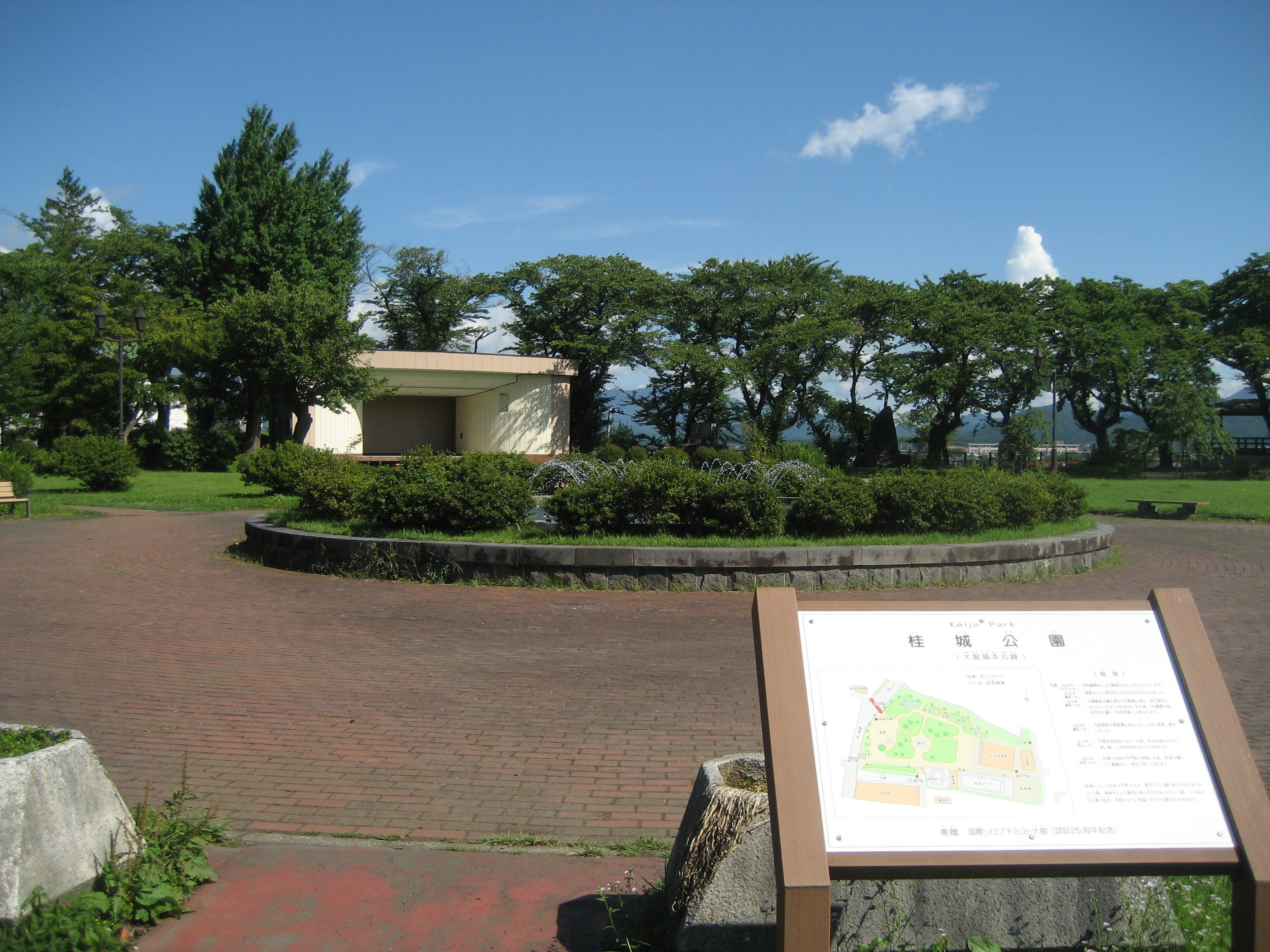
Odate Castle

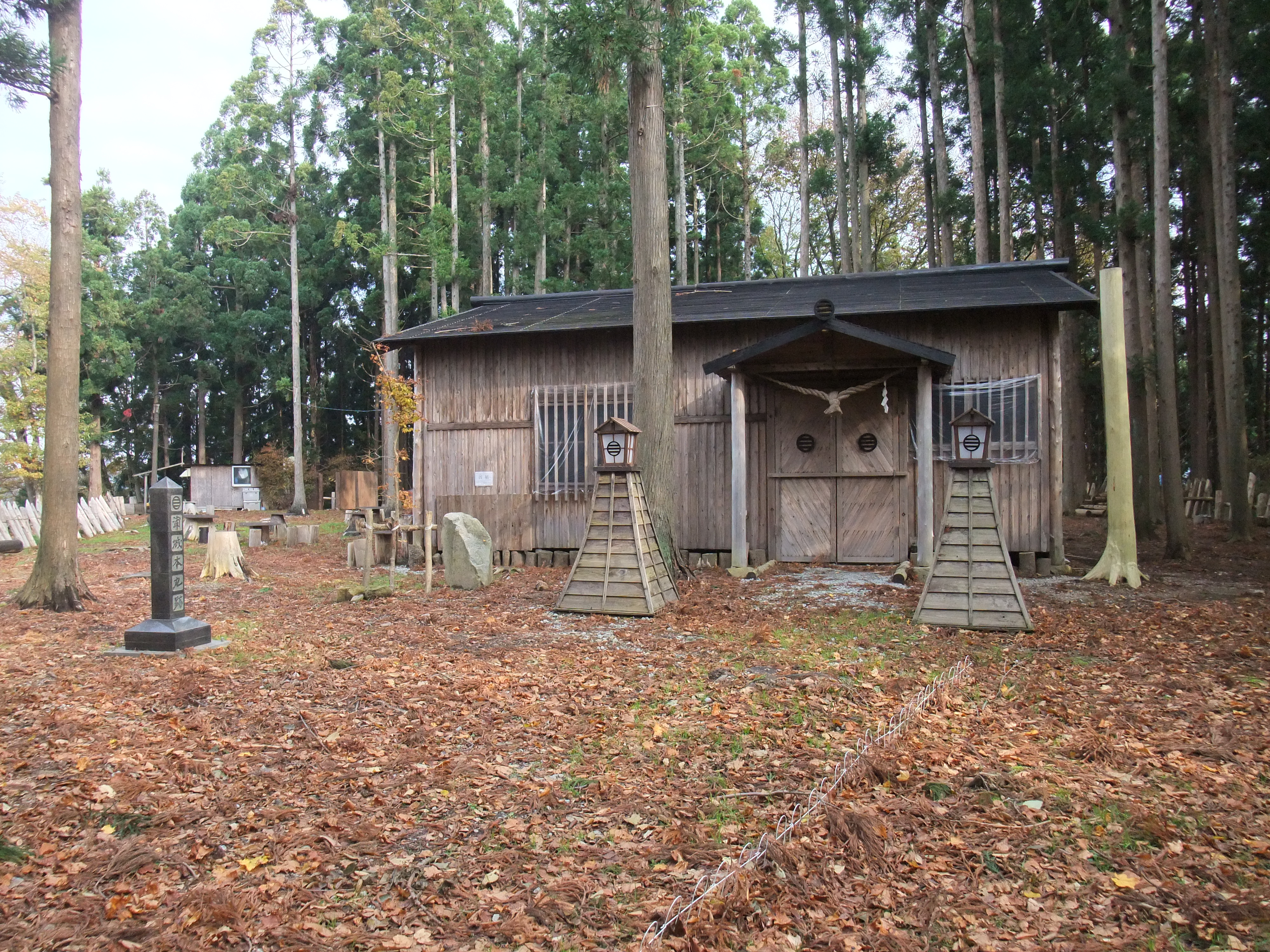
Ura Castle

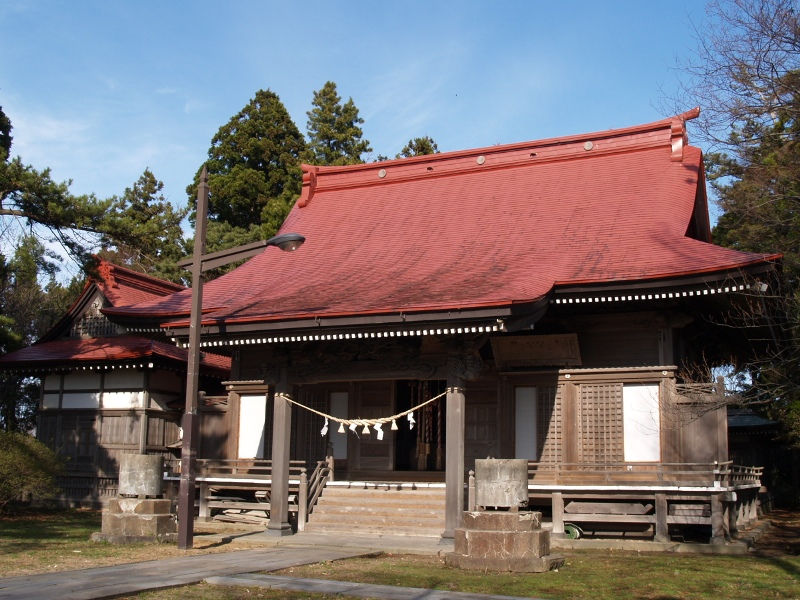
Koshiō Shrine

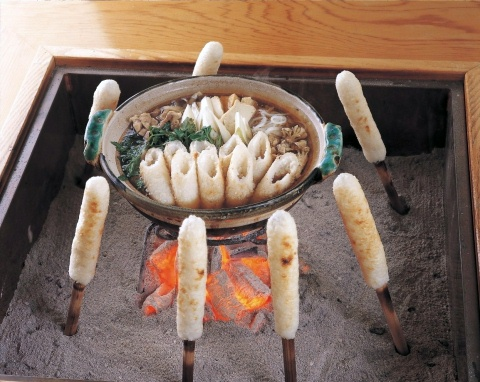
Kiritanpo

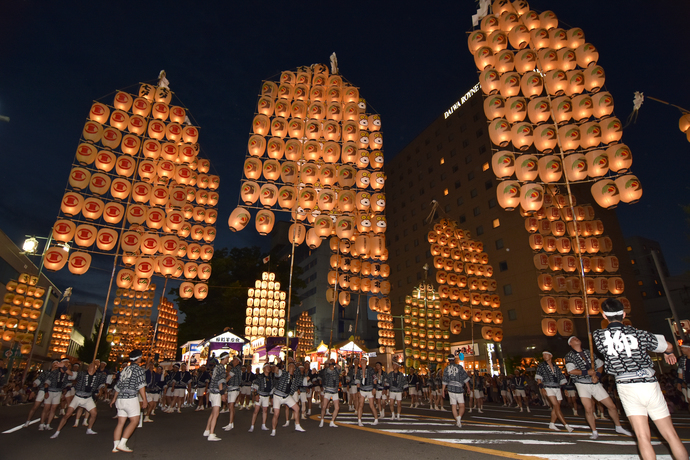
Akita Kantō

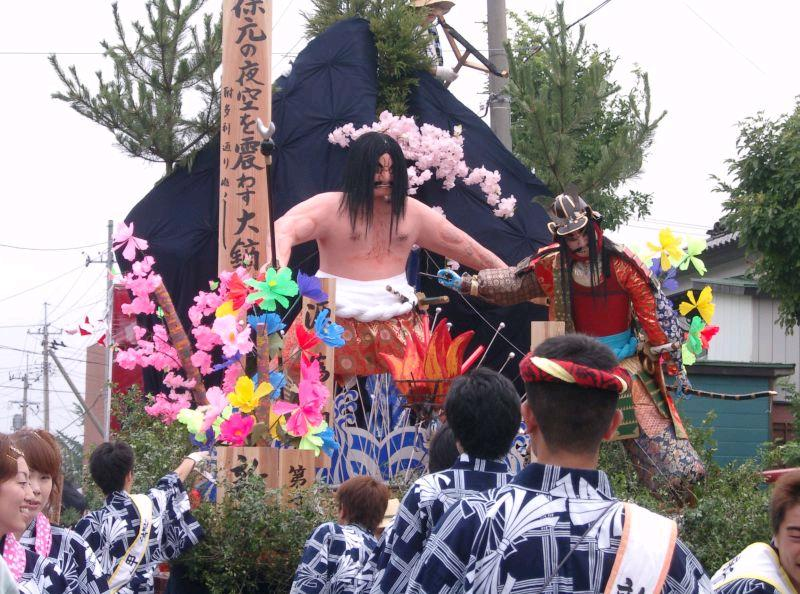
Tsuchizaki Shinmeisha Shrine Annual Celebration And The Float Festival

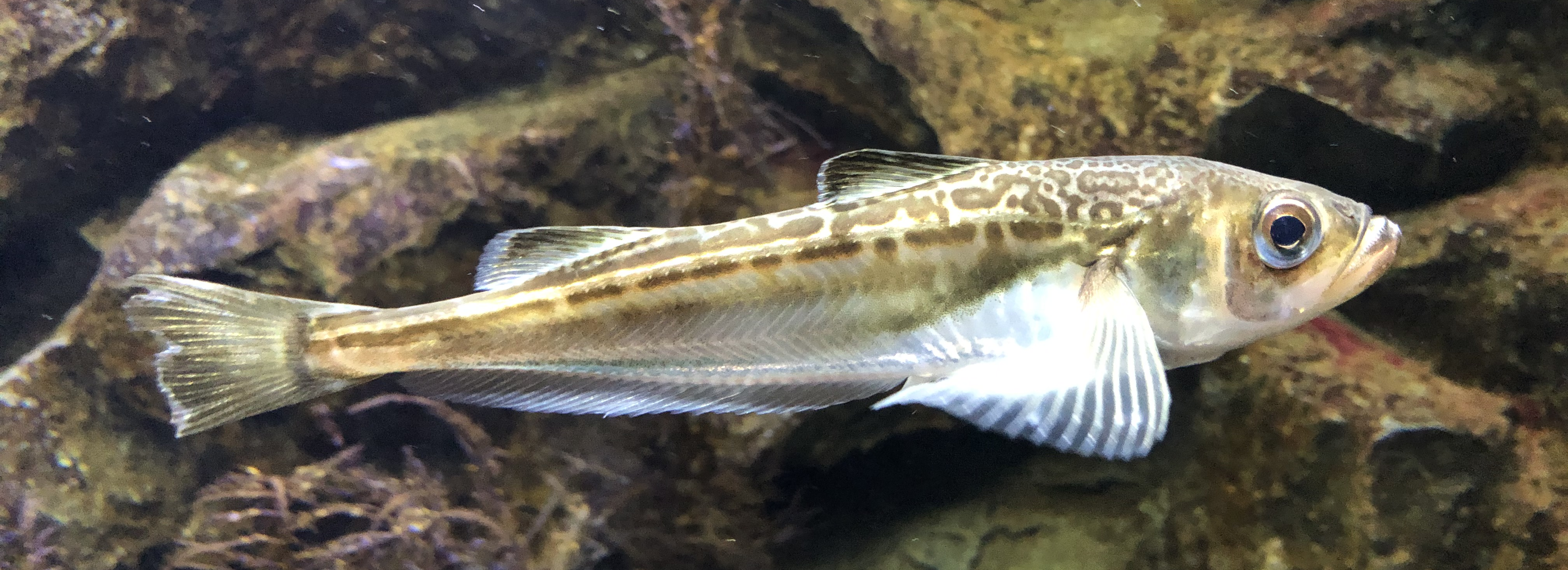
Japanese sandfish

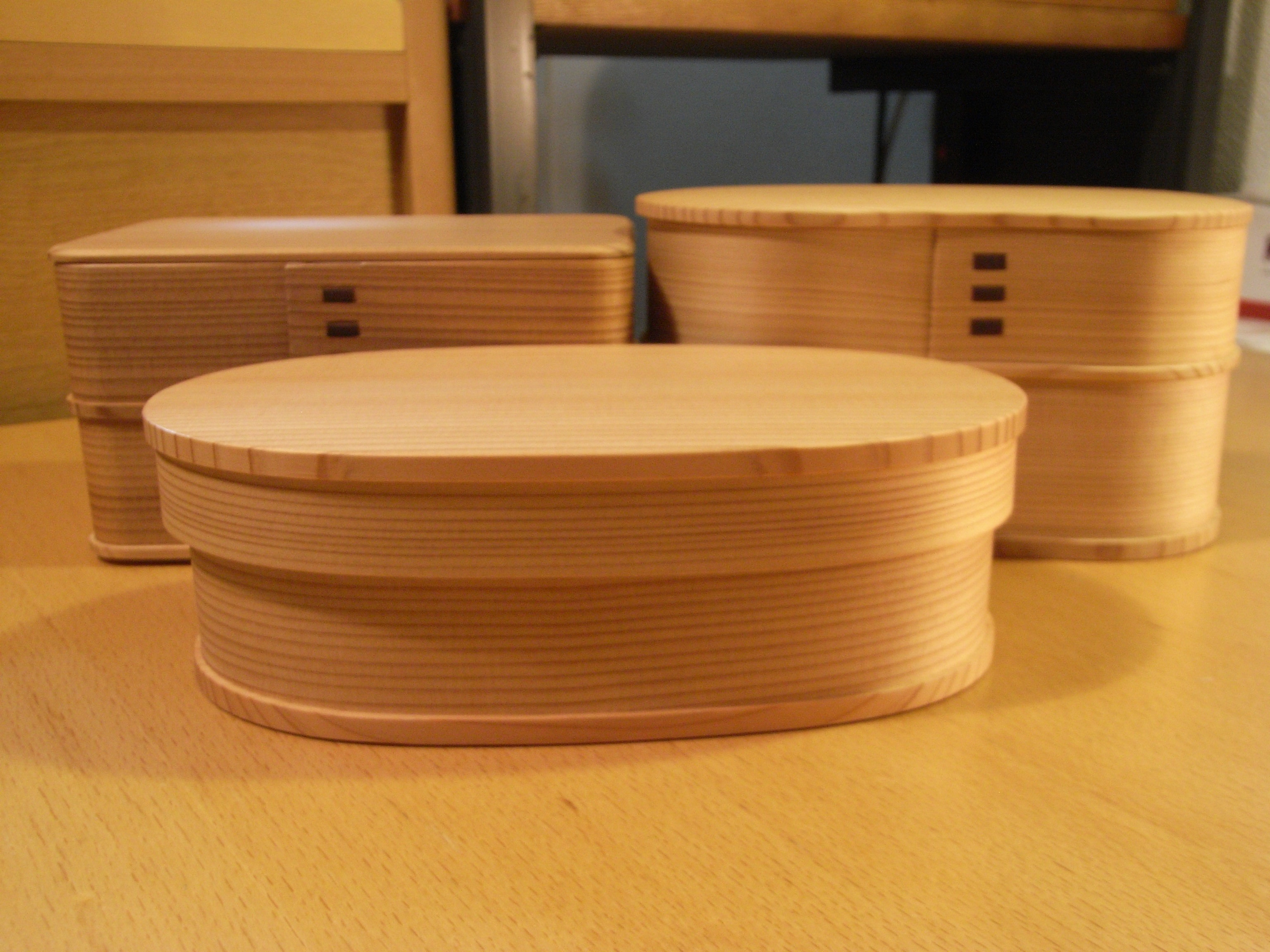
Magewappa

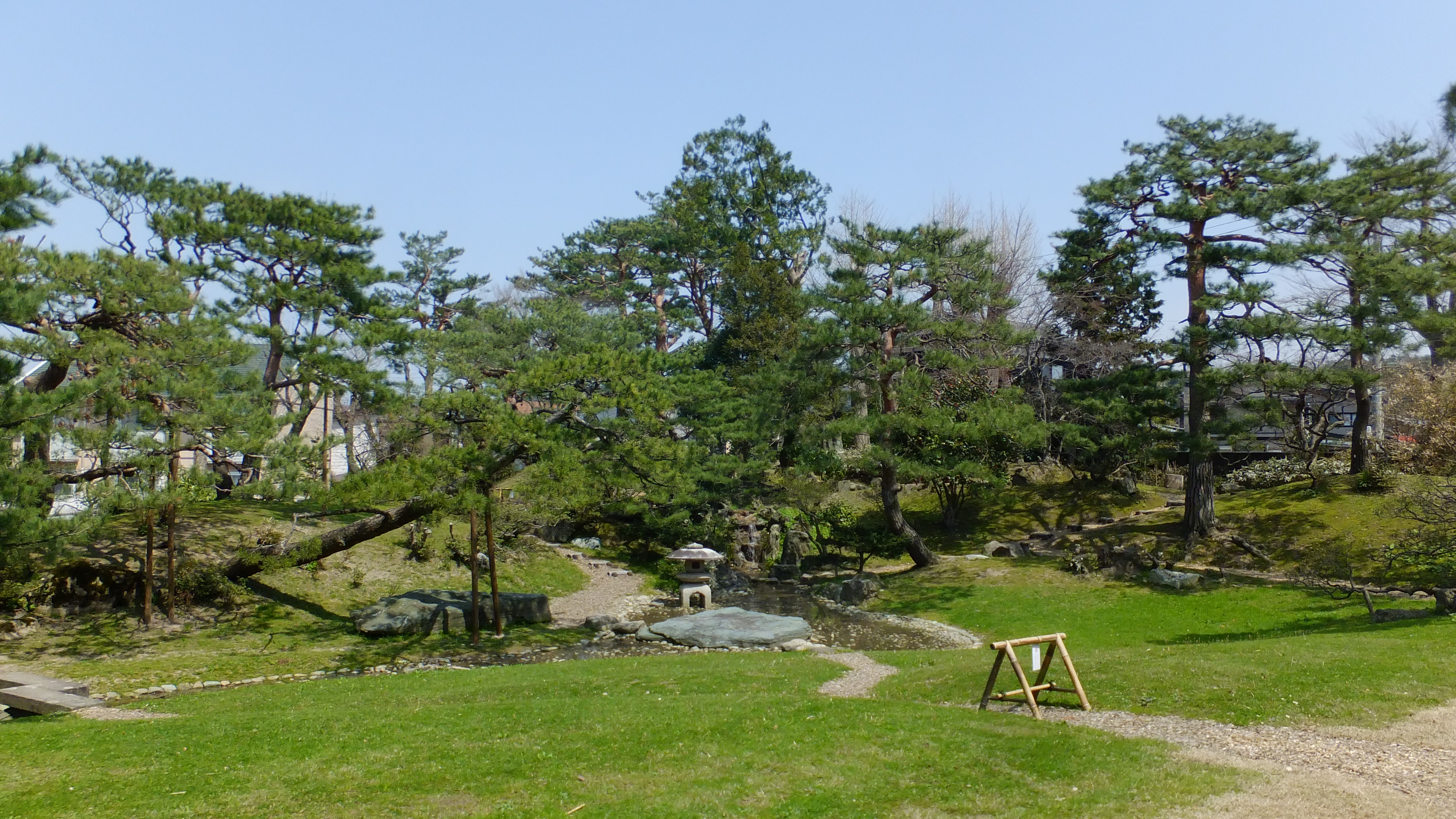
Joshitei

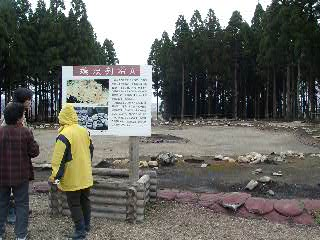
Isedōtai Ruins
