= Minamisōma District, Chiba =

Former district in Chiba prefecture, Japan

Minamisōma District (南相馬郡, Minamisōma-gun) was a district located in Chiba Prefecture, Japan.

== District timeline ==
- 1878 – Minamisōma District is founded after the former Sōma District areas designated within Chiba Prefecture.
- 1889 – At the time of municipal status enforcement, the district had two towns and four villages:
  - The towns of Abiko and Fussa, and the village of Kohoku (city of Abiko)
  - The village of Tomise (either the cities of Abiko or Kashiwa)
  - The villages of Tega and Fusō (Town of Shonan → City of Kashiwa)
- April 1, 1897 – Minamisōma District was merged into Higashikatsushika District. Therefore, Minamisōma District was dissolved as a result of this merger.
