= Otowa =

Otowa 音羽町
- Former municipality
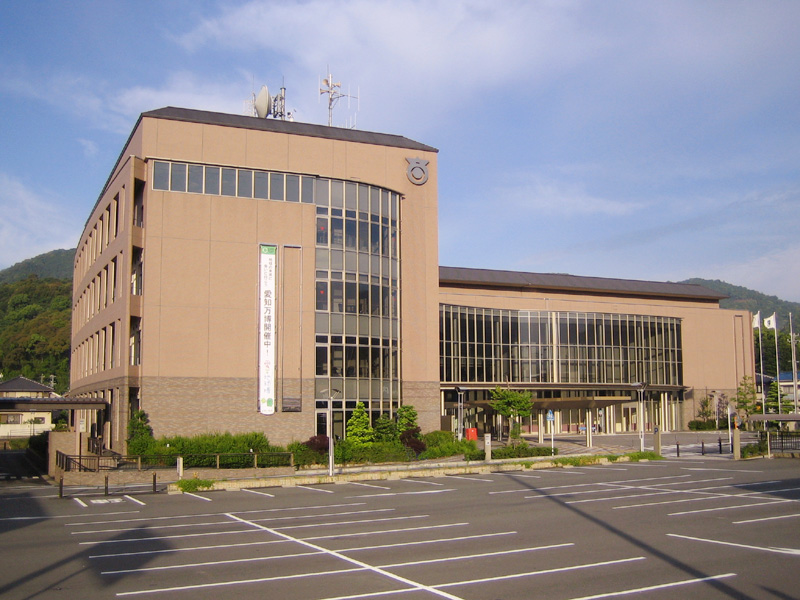
- Otowa Town Office and Cultural Hall

- Flag Emblem

- Location of Otowa in Aichi Prefecture

- Location in Japan
- Coordinates: 34°51′21″N 137°18′38″E
- Country: Japan
- Region: Chūbu (Tōkai)
- Prefecture: Aichi Prefecture
- District: Hoi
- Merged: January 15, 2008 (now part of Toyokawa)

Area
  - Total: 29.65 km^{2} (11.45 sq mi)

Population (November 1, 2007)
  - Total: 8,870
  - Density: 299.15/km^{2} (774.8/sq mi)
- Time zone: UTC+09:00 (JST)
- Website: City of Toyokawa
- Symbols
- Flower: Enkianthus subsessilis
- Tree: Azalea

Otowa (音羽町, Otowa-chō) was a town located in Hoi District, Aichi Prefecture, Japan.

On January 15, 2008, Otowa, along with the town of Mito (also from Hoi District), was merged into the expanded city of Toyokawa.

As of November 1, 2007 (the last census data prior to the merger), the town had an estimated population of 8,870 and a population density of 299.15 persons per km^{2}. The total area was 29.65 km^{2}.

== Geography ==
- Principal mountains: Kyōgamine (京ヶ峰), Mt. Miyaji (宮路山), Shiro-yama (城山), Mt. Kan'non (観音山)
- Principal rivers: Otowa River (音羽川), Yamakage River (山陰川)

== History ==
- June 23, 1894 - Akasaka Village changed over to Akasaka Town (赤坂町).
- April 1, 1955 - Otowa was founded by the unification of Akasaka Town, Nagasawa Village (長沢村) and Hagi Village (萩村).
- 1981 - Otowa Town Office was moved. Symbol of Otowa was established.
- 1986 - Tōmei Expressway Otowa-Gamagori Interchange opened.
- 1987 - The rezoning of Akasaka was carried. ( - 1993)
- 1992 - Otowa Town Field Park (音羽町運動公園) was completed.
- 1999 - Otowa Town Office was moved. New office and Cultural Hall ("Windia Hall") was completed.
- 2000 - Otowa Town Library and Akasaka Community Center was completed.
- 2002 - Akasaka Rest House (赤坂休憩所), commonly called "Yoramaikan (よらまいかん)" was completed.
- 2005 - Ceremony to celebrate the 50th anniversary of the founding Otowa Town was held.
- January 15, 2008 - Otowa Town, along with Mito Town (also from Hoi District), was merged into the expanded Toyokawa City.

== Administration ==
=== Successive mayors ===
#	Name	Kanji	Took office	Left office
1	Watanabe Ryūji	渡邉 隆次	April 30, 1955	April 29, 1959
2	Sakakibara Buntarō	榊原 文太郎	April 30, 1959	June 10, 1962
3	Uebayashi Tahē	上林 多兵惠	July 29, 1962	December 18, 1963
4	Iyoda Isamu	伊與田 勇	January 21, 1964	January 20, 1968
5-8	Horiuchi Shigeaki	堀内 重昭	January 21, 1968	January 20, 1984
9-12	Nakamori Kōichi	中森 幸一	January 21, 1984	January 20, 2000
13-14	Utsuno Takeshi	宇都野 武	January 21, 2000	January 14, 2008

== Economy ==
- Tokai Rika Otowa Factory

== Region ==
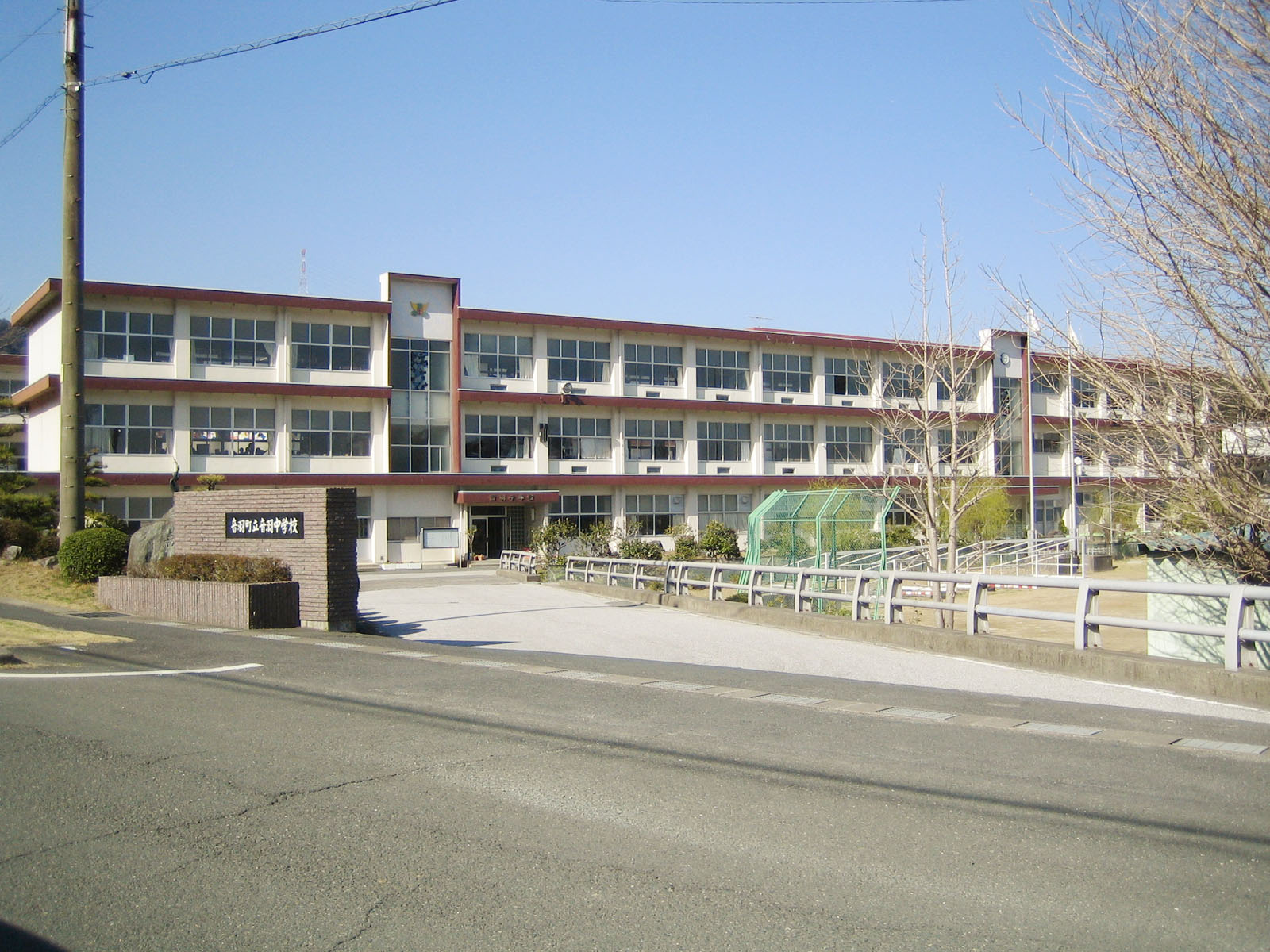
Otowa Junior High School

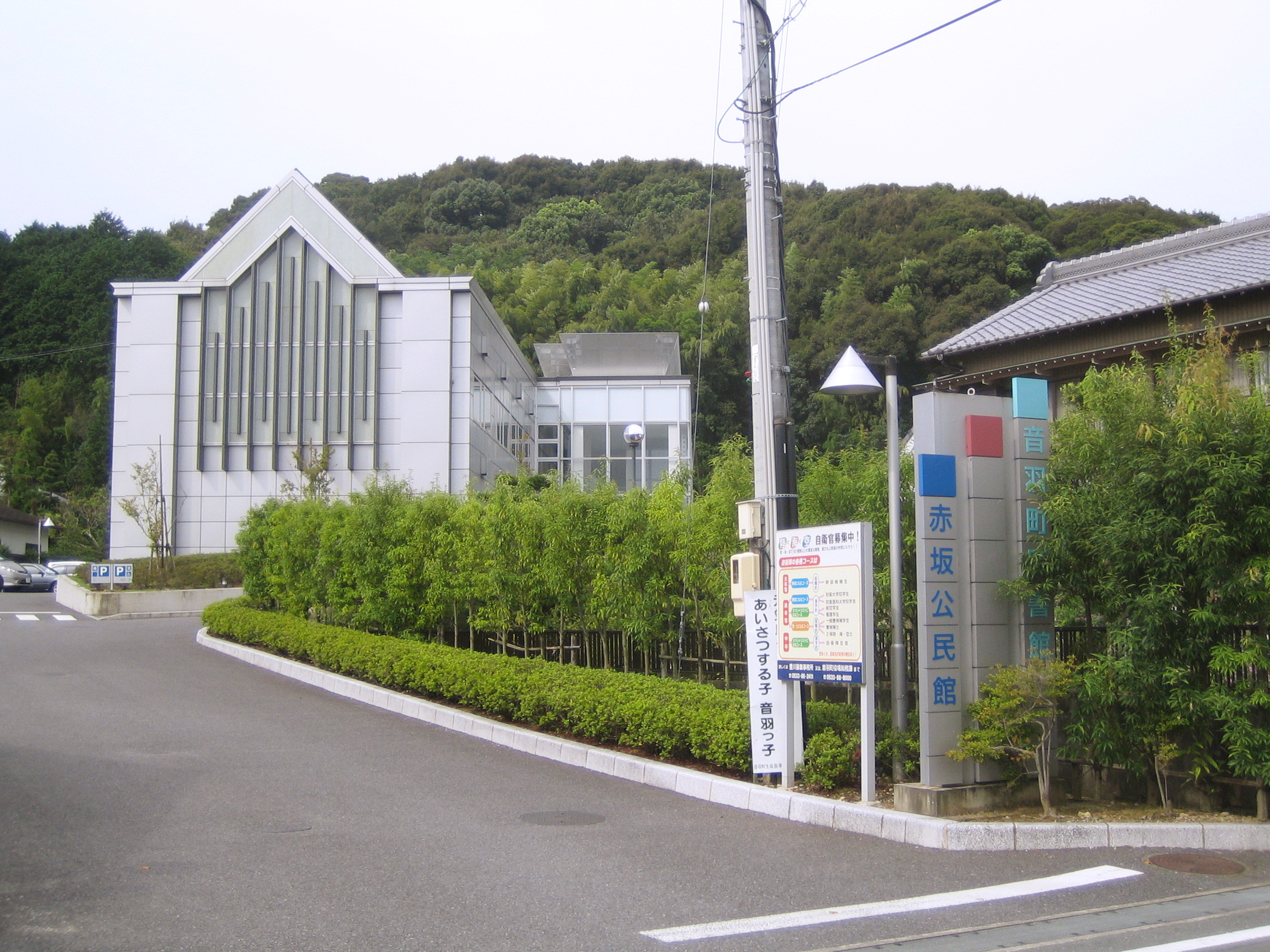
Otowa Town Library and Akasaka Community Center

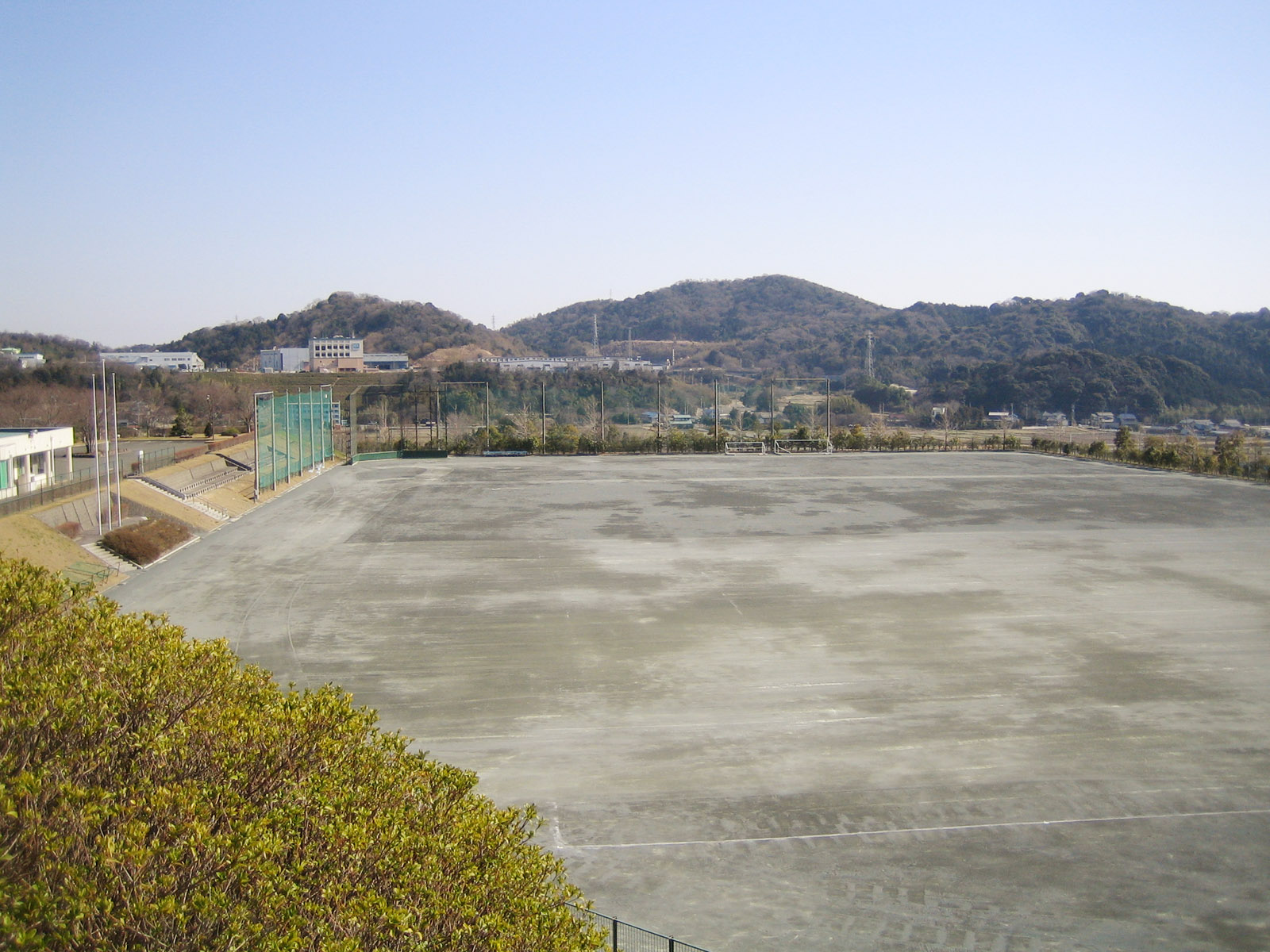
Otowa Town Field Park

=== Education ===
==== Primary schools ====
- Akasaka Primary School
- Nagasawa Primary School
- Hagi Primary School

==== Junior High school ====
- Otowa Junior High School

=== Social education ===
==== Ceremony Hall ====
- Otowa Town Cultural Hall ("Windia Hall")

==== Community centers ====
- Akasaka Community Center
- Nagasawa Community Center
- Hagi Community Center
- Akasakadai Community Center

==== Library ====
- Otowa Town Library

==== Athletic institution ====
- Otowa Town Field Park

== Transportation ==
=== Railway ===
- Meitetsu Nagoya Main Line - Meiden-Akasaka Station, Meiden-Nagasawa Station

=== Road ===
==== Expressway ====
- Interchange - Tōmei Expressway Otowa-Gamagori Interchange

==== Toll road ====
- Toll road - Otowa-Gamagori Toll Road, commonly called "Mikawa Bay Orange Road (三河湾オレンジロード)"

==== National highway ====
- National highway - Route 1

=== Bus ===
- Tōmei Highway Bus: Otowa Bus Stop
- Otowa Town Community Bus

=== Local attractions ===
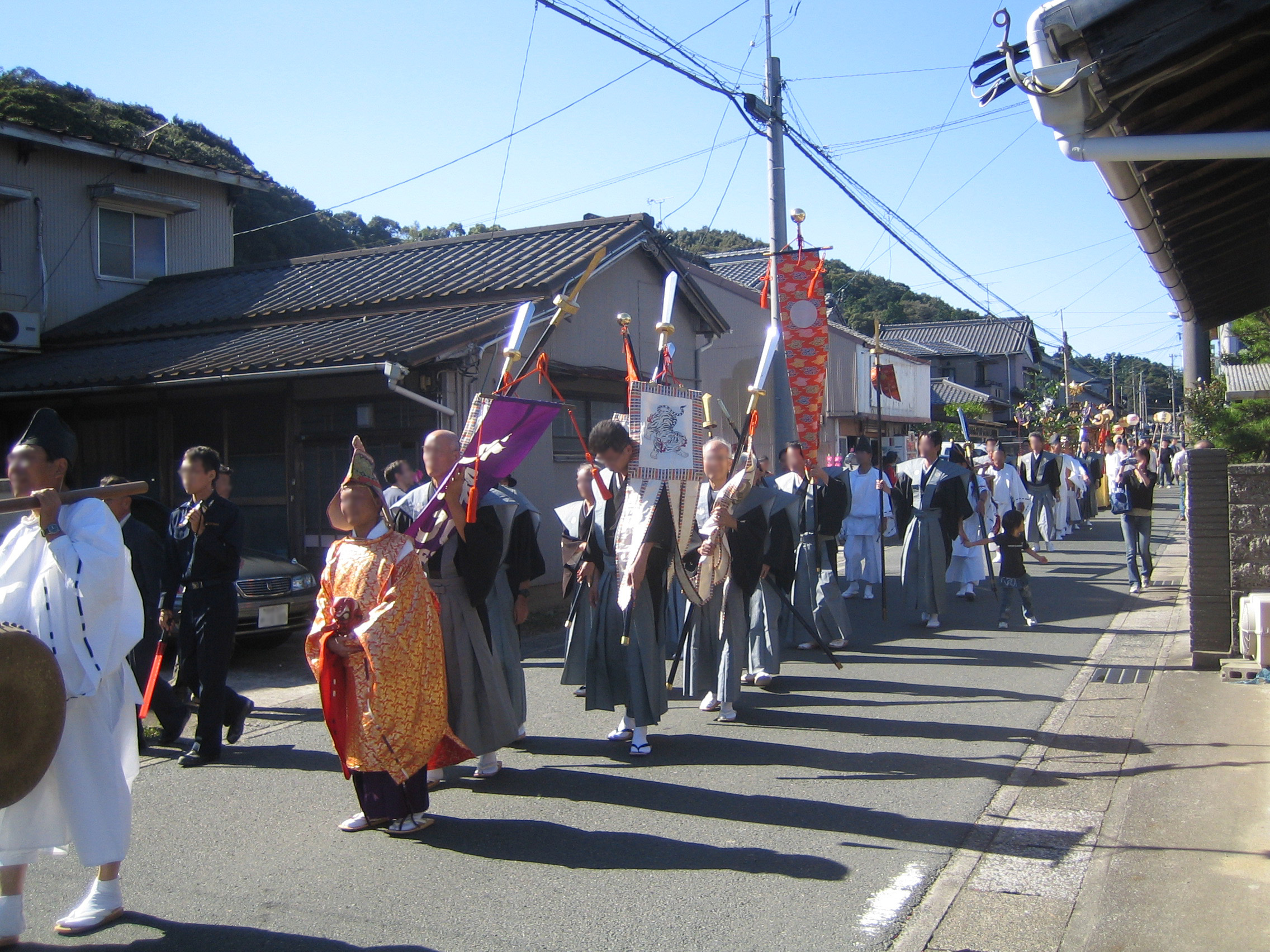
Reenactment of the daimyo's procession

- Akasaka-juku (赤坂宿) - The thirty-sixth of the fifty-three stations of the Tōkaidō.
- Mt. Miyaji (宮路山 Miyaji-san) - It is said that Empress Jitō visited this mountain. In the autumn, maple leaves turn red.
- Ruins of the Nagasawa Castle (長沢城址) - Today, The Nagasawa Primary School and the residential area of Kojō (古城団地 Kojō Danchi) is located in this site. The word "Kojō" means "old castle".
- Ceremony to pray for rain (雨乞い祭り amagoi matsuri) - A ceremony held in every August.
- Ceremony of the Sugimori Hachimansha (杉森八幡社祭礼) - A ceremony held in every October. In this ceremony, the daimyō's procession is reenacted.
