= Okazaki-shuku =

Thirty-eighth of the 53 stations of the Tōkaidō

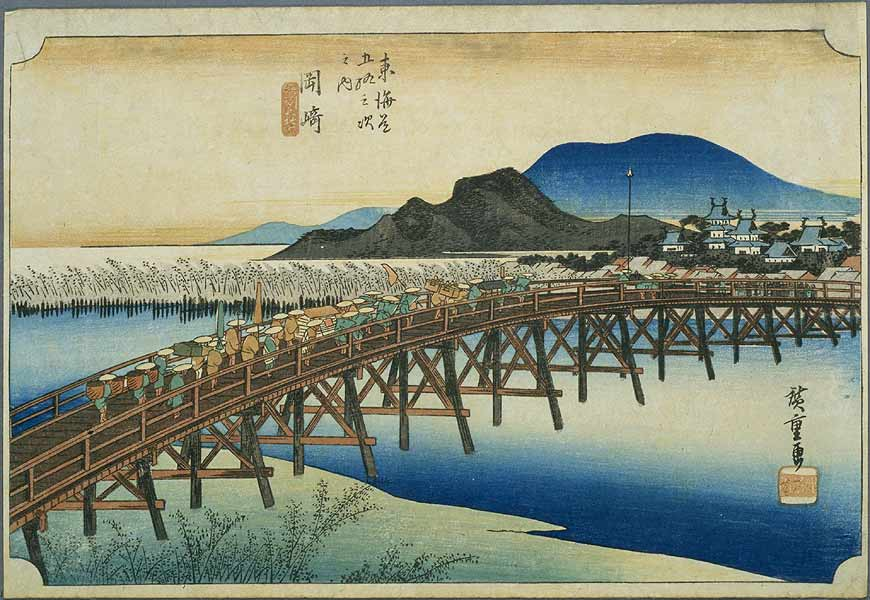
Okazaki-juku in the 1830s, as depicted by Hiroshige in the Hōeidō edition of The Fifty-three Stations of the Tōkaidō (1831–1834)

Okazaki-shuku (岡崎宿, Okazaki-shuku) was the thirty-eighth of the fifty-three stations of the Tōkaidō. It is located in the present-day city of Okazaki, in Aichi Prefecture, Japan.

== History ==
Okazaki-shuku was a part of the flourishing castle town surrounding Okazaki Castle, the headquarters for Okazaki Domain. The classic ukiyo-e print by Andō Hiroshige (Hōeidō edition) from 1831 to 1834 depicts a Yahagibashi, one of the few bridges permitted by the Tokugawa shogunate on the Tōkaidō, and one of the longest bridges built in Japan during the early Edo period. Okazaki Castle is depicted in the distance on the far shore of the river. Following the Meiji restoration, with the construction of railroads, the route of what became the Tokaido Main Line was laid down through the nearby village of Hane (羽根村 Hane-mura) to the south. Unlike Goyu-shuku and Akasaka-juku, but this did not cause a huge economic decline to Okazaki-shuku. There was a horse-drawn rail line connecting Okazaki to the train station, as well as a teachers' school, which kept the town alive. On the other hand, Okazaki was not able to compete with the growth of Toyohashi, which was located directly on the railway, and which gained city-status first. Because of fires during World War II and the subsequent rebuilding of Okazaki in the post-war years, there are few remnants of the post town remaining today.

== Neighboring post towns ==
Tōkaidō
Fujikawa-shuku - Okazaki-shuku - Chiryū-juku

Shio no Michi's Sanshū Kaidō
Kugyūdaira-juku - Okazaki-shuku (ending location)
