= CA45 =

CA45, CA-45, or CA 45 may refer to:

- California's 45th congressional district, a congressional district in the U.S. state of California
- California State Route 45, a state highway in California
- USS Wichita (CA-45), a United States Navy cruiser
- Calcium-45 (Ca-45 or ^{45}Ca), an isotope of calcium
- Caproni Ca.45, an Italian aircraft
- Mikawa-Ōtsuka Station, a railway station in Gamagōri, Japan (station code: CA45)
