= Hōrai, Aichi =

Hōrai 鳳来町
- Former municipality
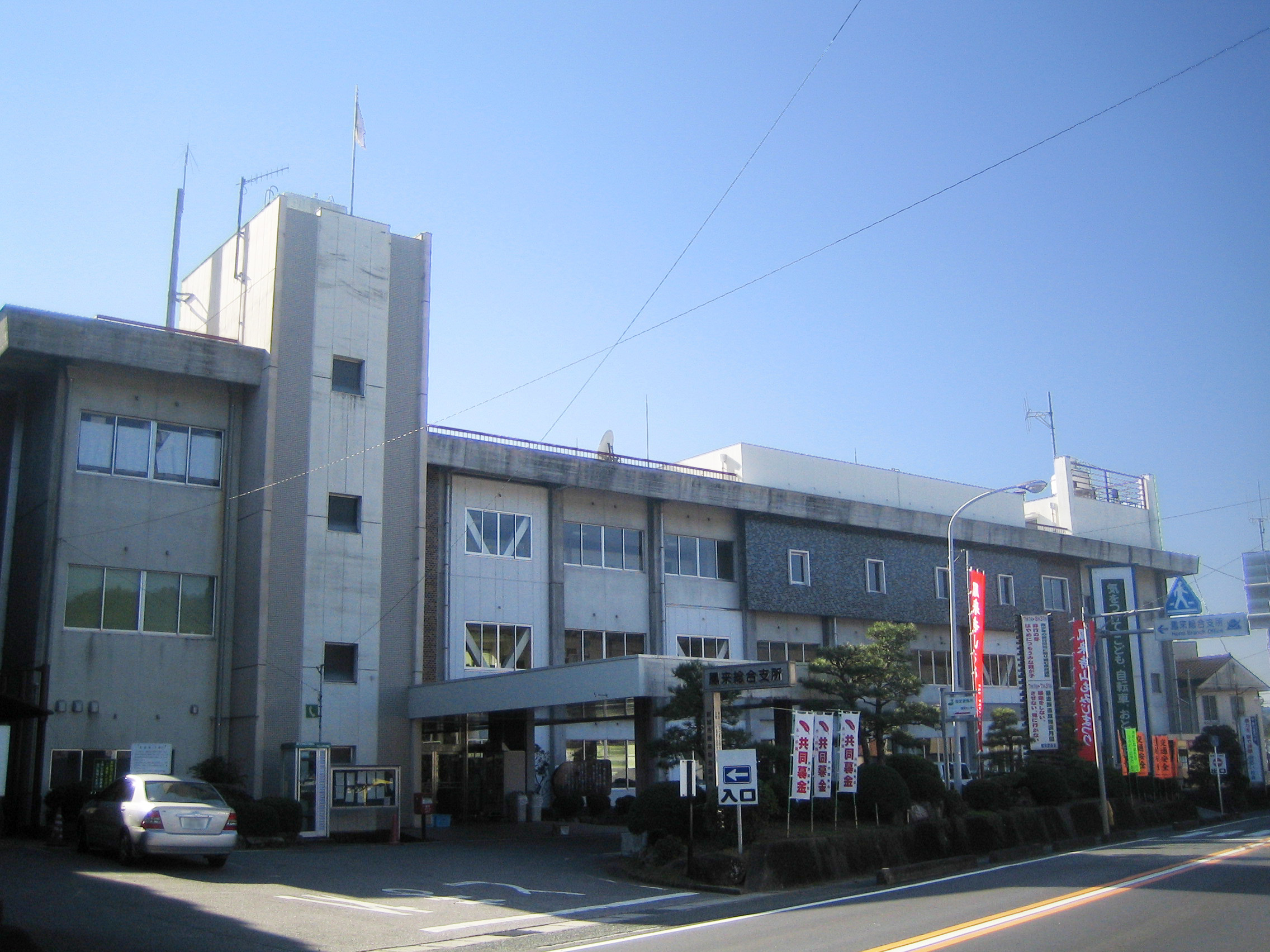
- Former Hōrai Town Office

- Flag Emblem

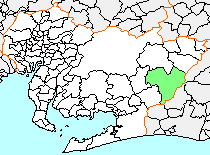
- Location of Hōrai in Aichi Prefecture

- Location in Japan
- Coordinates: 34°55′59.06″N 137°34′31.2″E
- Country: Japan
- Region: Chūbu (Tōkai)
- Prefecture: Aichi Prefecture
- District: Minamishitara
- Merged: October 1, 2005 (now part of Shinshiro)

Area
  - Total: 263.66 km^{2} (101.80 sq mi)

Population (September 1, 2005)
  - Total: 13,565
  - Density: 51.45/km^{2} (133.3/sq mi)
- Time zone: UTC+09:00 (JST)
- Symbols
- Bird: Eurasian scops-owl
- Flower: Rhododendron
- Tree: Cryptomeria

Hōrai (鳳来町, Hōrai-chō) was a town located in Minamishitara District, Aichi Prefecture, Japan.

As of May 1, 2004, the town had an estimated population of 13,565 and a density of 51.45 persons per km^{2}. Its total area was 263.66 km^{2}.

== Geography ==
Hōrai was located in east-central of Aichi Prefecture. Some 90 percent of the village area was covered in mountains and forest, and most was within the borders of the Aichi Kōgen Quasi-National Park

== History ==
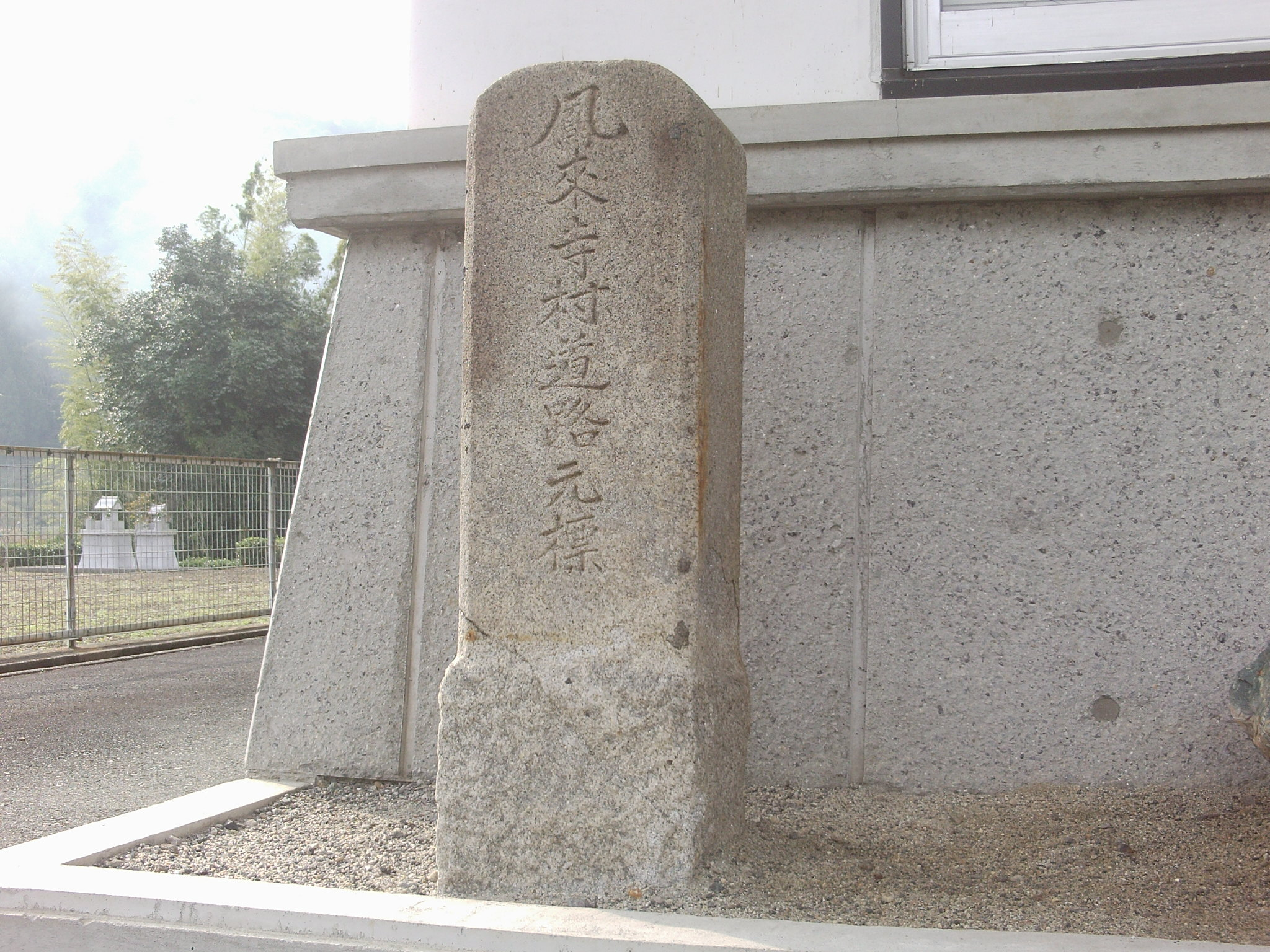
The Kilometre Zero of Horaiji

Hōraiji village was created in the early Meiji period cadastral reform on 1878, but has existed since at least the Muromachi period as a monzen machi to the mountain cult temple of Hōrai-ji.

On April 1, 1956, Hōraiji and Nagashino villages merged with Nanago village and Ono Town from Yana District to form the town of Hōrai. They were joined by Ebi Town from Minamishitara District and Yamayoshida Village from Yana District on September 30 of the same year.

On October 1, 2005, Hōrai, along with the village of Tsukude (also from Minamishitara District), was merged into the expanded city of Shinshiro and has ceased to exist as an independent municipality.

== Recreation ==
Mount Horai, Aichi is a climbing area located just north of Shinshiro. It is an area with both bouldering and hard sport climbing, up to 5.14d, on steep volcanic rock.

Byaku-dou (V15) and Epitaph (V15) are well known boulder problems opened by Dai Koyamada.

Climbers are not allowed to leave quick-draws hanging from the routes overnight. According to the priests in charge of the many shrines on Mount Horai, this would greatly upset the numerous spirits that visit the forest.
