= Minamishitara District =

Former district in Aichi prefecture, Japan

Coordinates: 34°54′N 137°30′E

Map of Minamishitara District (pink) in Aichi Prefecture

Minamishitara (南設楽郡, Minamishitara-gun) was a district located in eastern Aichi Prefecture, Japan.

As of 2004 (the last data available), the district had an estimated population of 16,703 with a density of 43.84 persons per km^{2}. Its total area was 381.06 km^{2}.

== Municipalities ==
Prior to its dissolution, the district consisted of only one town and one village:

- Hōrai (Note: Classified as a town.)
- Tsukude (Note: Classified as a village.)

== History ==
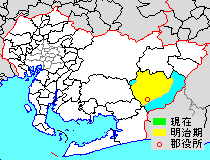
Map showing original extent of Minamishitara District in Aichi Prefecture: * yellow - areas formerly within the district borders during the early Meiji period

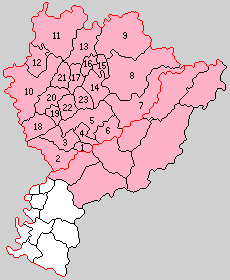
Colored areas are in this district.

Shitara District (設楽郡) was one of the ancient districts of Mikawa Province having been created in 903 out of Hoi District (宝飯郡). In the cadastral reforms of the early Meiji period, on July 22, 1878 Shitara District was divided into Minamishitara District and Kitashitara District. With the organization of municipalities on October 1, 1889, Minamishitara District was divided into one town (Shinshiro) and 22 villages.

=== District Timeline ===
The village of Ebi was elevated to town status on April 28, 1894. In a round of consolidation, the remaining number of villages was reduced from 21 to five in 1906. On April 15, 1955, Shishiro annexed the villages of Chisato and Togō, along with the villages of Funatsuke and Yana from Yana District. On April 1, 1956, the villages of Nagashino and Hōrai were merged with the town of Ono and village of Nanasato in Yana District to form the expanded town of Hōrai, leaving Minamishitara District with three towns and one village. In September of the same year, the town of Ebi was annexed by Hōrai along with the village of Yamayoshida (from Yana District). On November 1, 1958, Shinshiro was elevated to city status.

=== Recent mergers ===
- On October 1, 2005 - The town of Hōrai, and the village of Tsukude were merged into the expanded city of Shinshiro (formerly also a part of the district). Therefore, Minamishitara District was dissolved as a result of this merger.

== See also ==
- List of dissolved districts of Japan
