= Kozakai =

Kozakai 小坂井町
- Former municipality
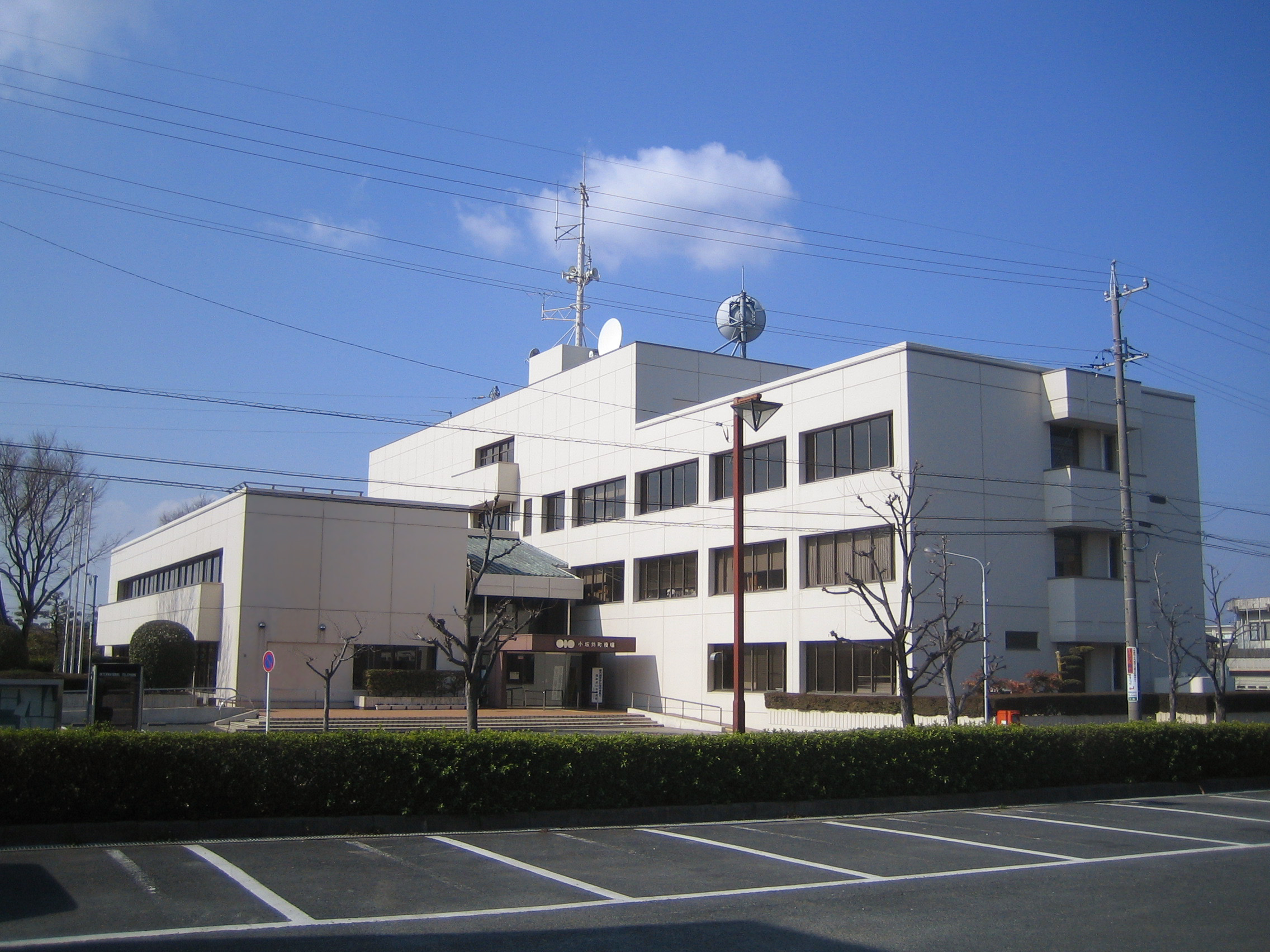
- Kozakai Town Office

- Flag Emblem

- Location of Kozakai in Aichi Prefecture

- Location in Japan
- Coordinates: 34°48′N 137°22′E
- Country: Japan
- Region: Chūbu (Tōkai)
- Prefecture: Aichi Prefecture
- District: Hoi
- Merged: February 1, 2010 (now part of Toyokawa)

Area
  - Total: 9.92 km^{2} (3.83 sq mi)

Population (November 1, 2007)
  - Total: 21,708
  - Density: 2,188.31/km^{2} (5,667.7/sq mi)
- Time zone: UTC+09:00 (JST)
- Website: City of Toyokawa
- Symbols
- Flower: Satsuki azalea
- Tree: Osmanthus

Kozakai (小坂井町, Kozakai-chō) was a town located in Hoi District, Aichi Prefecture, Japan.

As of November 1, 2007, (the last census information available) the town had an estimated population of 22,708 and a population density of 2,188.31 persons per km^{2}. The total area was 9.92 km^{2}.

On February 1, 2010, Kozakai was merged into the expanded city of Toyokawa. Therefore, Hoi District was dissolved as a result of this merger.

== History ==
- October 1, 1889 – Toyoaki Village (豊秋村) was founded.
- September 12, 1906 – Kozakai Village was founded by the unification of Toyoaki Village and Ina Village (伊奈村).
- September 12, 1926 – Kozakai Town was founded.
- 1973 – Toyokawa Shinkin Bank Incident (豊川信用金庫事件 Toyokawa Shin'yō Kinko Jiken) occurred.
- 1993 – Kozakai Town Cultural Hall (小坂井町文化会館) was completed.
- February 1, 2010 – Kozakai merged with the city of Toyokawa.

== Education ==
=== Primary schools ===
- Kozakai Nishi Primary School
- Kozakai Higashi Primary School

=== Junior High school ===
- Kozakai Junior High School

=== High school ===
- Kozakai High School

=== Social education ===
==== Ceremony Hall ====
- Kozakai Town Cultural Hall (小坂井町文化会館 Kozakai-chō Bunka Kaikan; commonly called "Freuden Hall")

== Transportation ==
=== Railway ===
- Central Japan Railway Company
  - Iida Line – Kozakai Station
  - Tōkaidō Main Line – Nishi-Kozakai Station
- Meitetsu Nagoya Main Line – Ina Station

=== Road ===
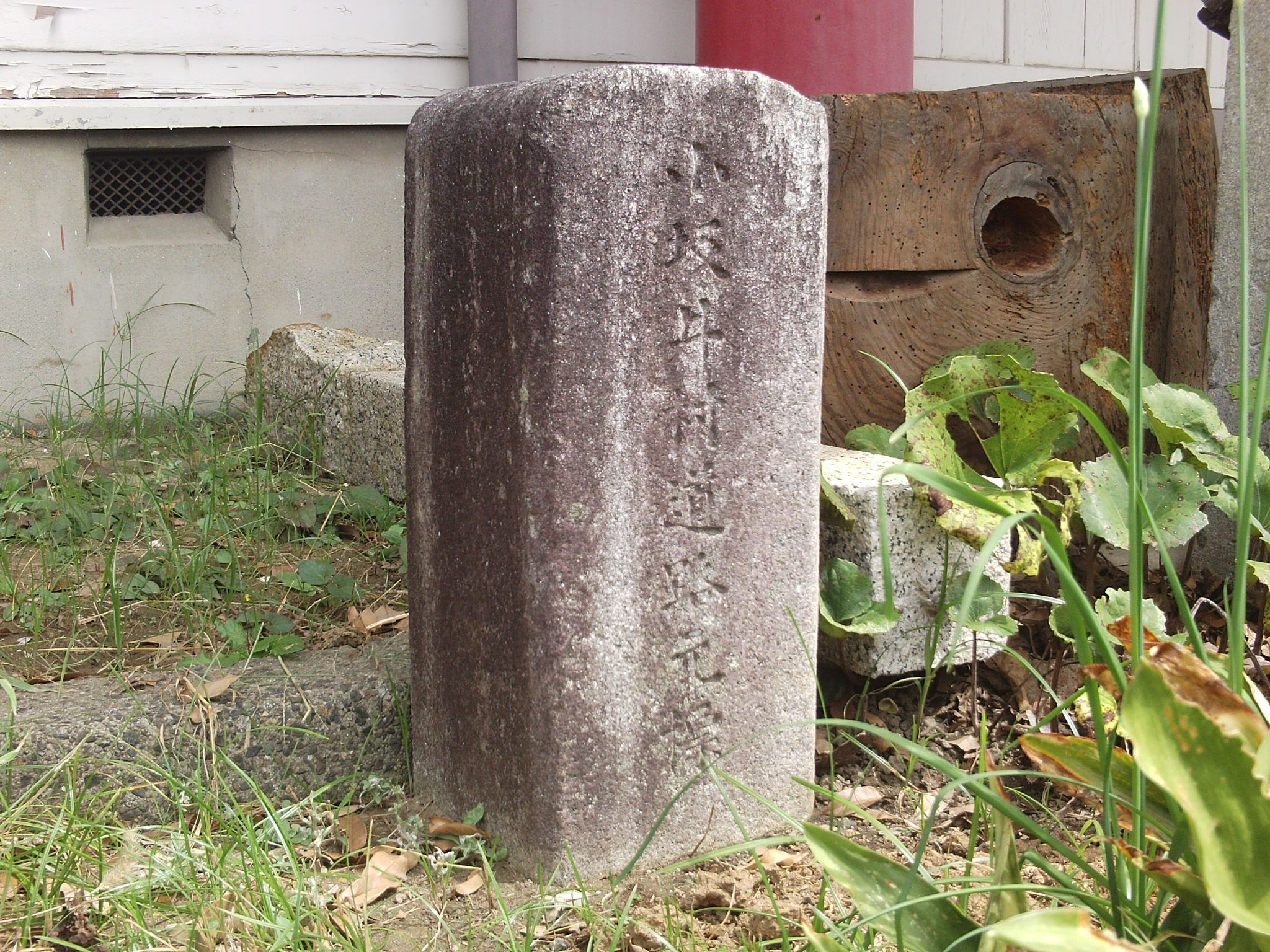
The Kilometre Zero of Kozakai

==== National highway ====
- National highway – Route 1, Route 151, Route 247

=== Local attractions ===
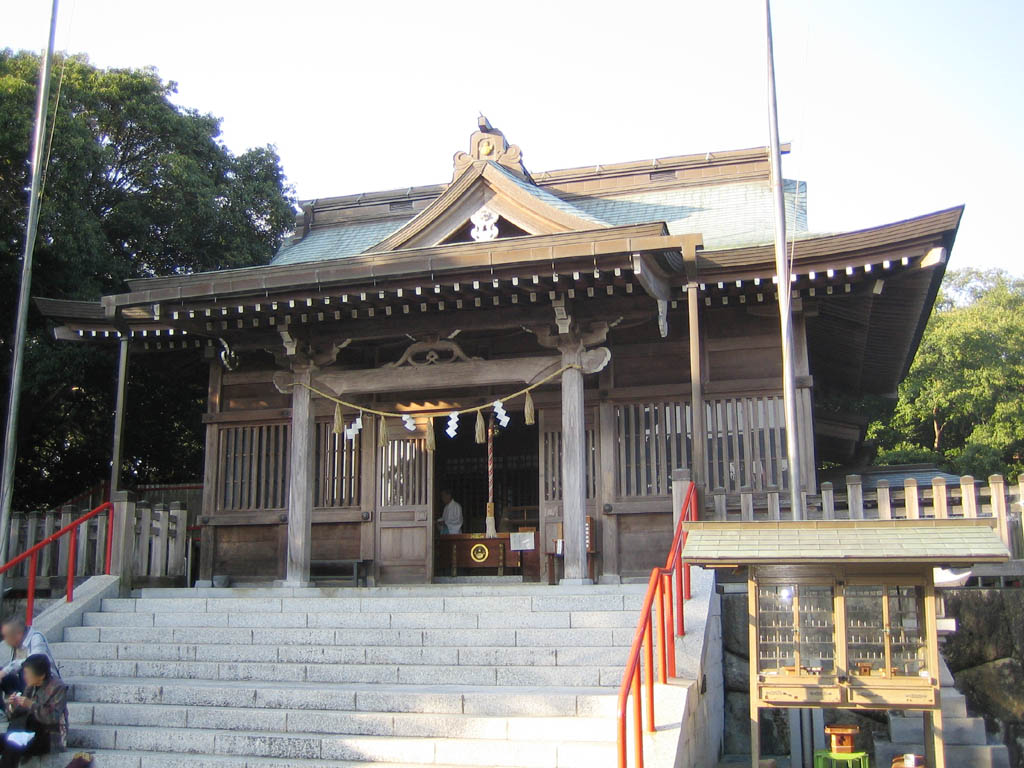
Gosha Inari

- Utari Jinja (菟足神社)
- Gosha Inari (五社稲荷)
- Ruins of Ina Castle (伊奈城趾)

== Noted persons from Kozakai ==
- Yasuhiko Okada (岡田 康彦 Okada Yasuhiko) – Former Administrative Vice-Minister of the Environment of Japan
