= Fujikawa-shuku =

Thirty-seventh of the 53 stations of the Tōkaidō

Coordinates: 34.911°N 137.223°E

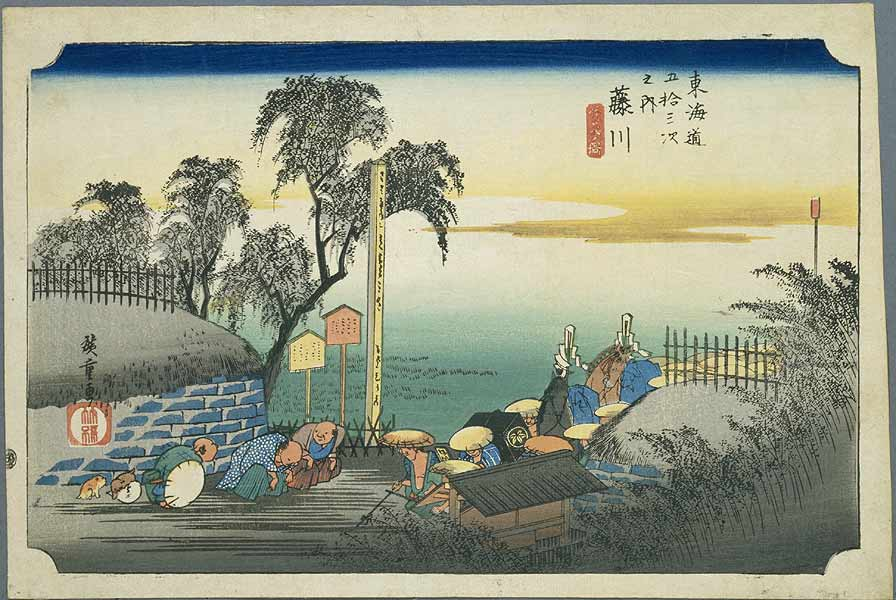
Fujikawa-juku in the 1830s, as depicted by Hiroshige in the Hōeidō edition of The Fifty-three Stations of the Tōkaidō (1831–1834)

Fujikawa-shuku (藤川宿, Fujikawa-shuku) was the thirty-seventh of the fifty-three stations of the Tōkaidō. It is located in the present-day city of Okazaki, in Aichi Prefecture, Japan. It was approximately 9 kilometres (5.6 mi) from Akasaka-juku, the preceding post station. Another accepted reading for this post town is "Fujikawa-juku."

At its peak, Fujikawa-juku was home to 302 buildings, including one honjin, one sub-honjin and 36 hatago. Its total population was approximately 1,200 people. The classic ukiyo-e print by Andō Hiroshige (Hōeidō edition) from 1831 to 1834 depicts a daimyō procession on sankin-kōtai entering the post station, which would have been a common occurrence. Three commoners are shown as kneeling as the lord's retinue passes. The Okazaki city government has been working actively on preserving this old post town as a tourist destination. In addition to creating the Fujikawa-shuku Archives Museum within the preserved waki-honjin, detailing the history of the post town, the city has preserved a number of old structures such old street lights, and traditional houses with lattice windows. A line of old pine trees extending for approximately a kilometer marks the location of the Tōkaidō road.

== Neighboring post towns ==
Tōkaidō
Akasaka-juku - Fujikawa-shuku - Okazaki-shuku
