= Mikawa-Miya Station =

Railway station in Gamagōri, Aichi Prefecture, Japan

CA46 Mikawa Miya Station 三河三谷駅
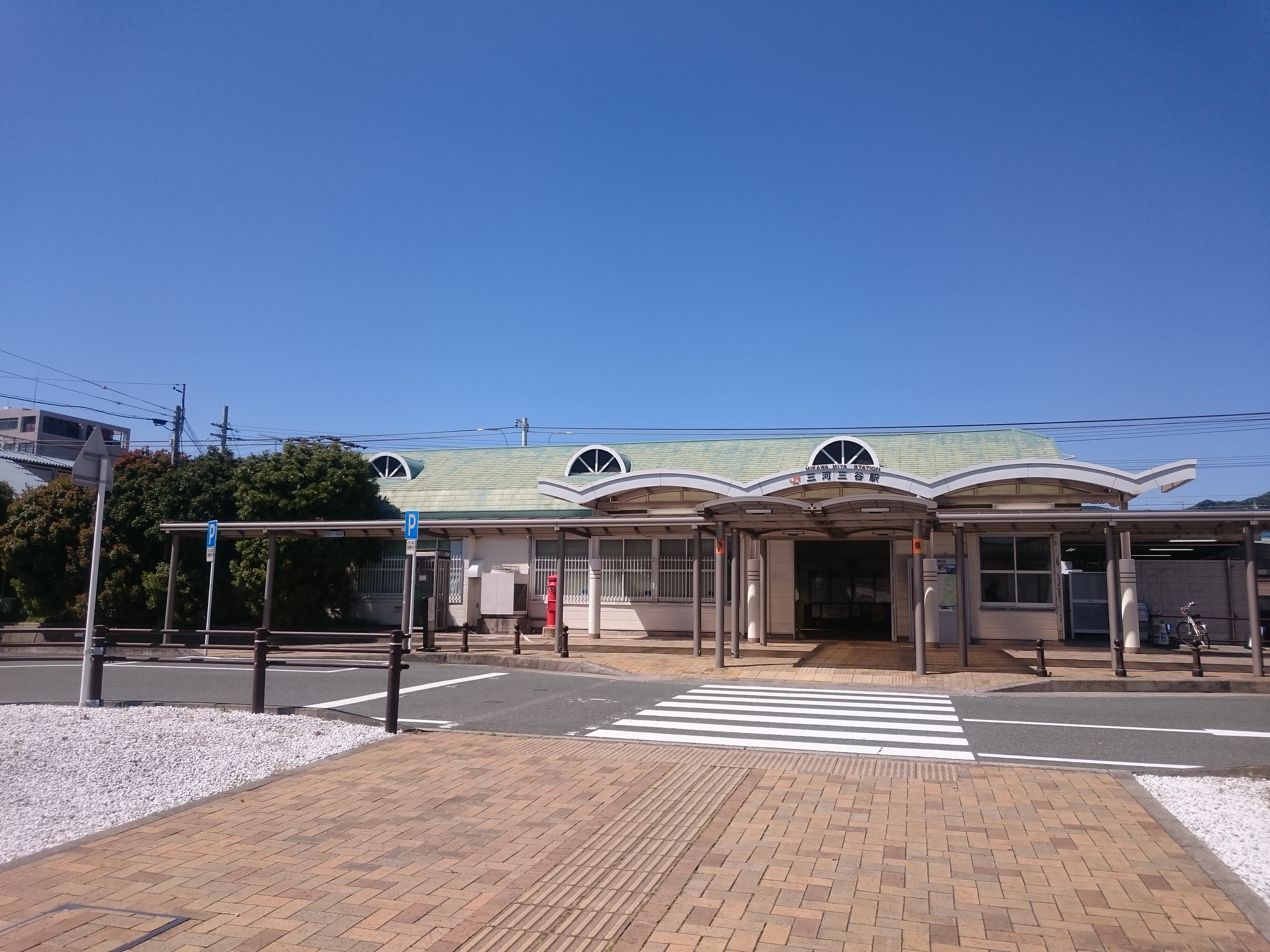
- Mikawa Miya Station in May 2018

General information
- Location: 13 Ueno Miya-cho, Gamagōri-shi, Aichi-ken 443-0021; Japan
- Coordinates: 34°49′5.3″N 137°14′59″E
- Operator: JR Central
- Line: Tokaido Main Line
- Distance: 308.3 kilometers from Tokyo
- Platforms: 2 side platforms

Other information
- Status: Unstaffed
- Station code: CA46

History
- Opened: July 3, 1929

Passengers
- 2023–2024: 3,446 daily
Location
- Location within Aichi Prefecture Location within Japan

Mikawa Miya Station (三河三谷駅, Mikawa Miya-eki) is a railway station in the city of Gamagōri, Aichi Prefecture, Japan, operated by Central Japan Railway Company (JR Tōkai).

== Lines ==
Mikawa-Miya Station is served by the Tōkaidō Main Line, and is located 308.3 kilometers from the starting point of the line at Tokyo Station.

== Station layout ==
The station has two opposed side platforms connected to the station building by a footbridge. The station building has automated ticket machines, TOICA automated turnstiles and is unattended.

=== Platforms ===
1	■ Tōkaidō Main Line	For Okazaki, Nagoya
2	■ Tōkaidō Main Line	For Toyohashi, Hamamatsu

== Adjacent stations ==
«	Service	»
Central Japan Railway Company
Tōkaidō Main Line
Special Rapid: Does not stop at this station
Toyohashi	New Rapid	Gamagōri
Toyohashi	Rapid	Gamagōri
Toyohashi	Sectional Rapid	Gamagōri
Mikawa-Ōtsuka	Local	Gamagōri

== Station history ==
Mikawa Miya Station began operations on July 3, 1929 as a station on the Japanese Government Railway (JGR) Tōkaidō Main Line. the JGR became the JNR (Japan National Railways) after World War II. Regularly scheduled freight services were discontinued in 1972. With the dissolution and privatization of the JNR on April 1, 1987, the station came under the control of the Central Japan Railway Company. A new station building was completed in 1990.

Station numbering was introduced to the section of the Tōkaidō Line operated JR Central in March 2018; Mikawa-Miya Station was assigned station number CA46.

== Passenger statistics ==
In fiscal 2017, the station was used by an average of 1940 passengers daily (boarding passengers only).

== Surrounding area ==
- Miya Fishing Port
- Japan National Route 23

== See also ==
- List of railway stations in Japan
