= Yana District =

Former district in Aichi Prefecture, Japan

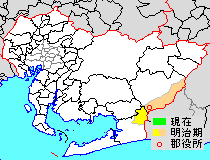
Location of former Yana-gun, Aichi Prefecture, highlighted in yellow.

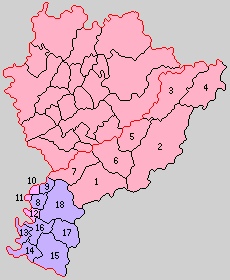
Colored areas are in this district.

Yana (八名郡, Yana-gun) was a rural district located in eastern Aichi Prefecture, Japan.

== History ==
=== District Timeline ===
- December 20, 1878 - Yana District was established during the early Meiji period establishment of the municipalities system, which initially consisted of 41 villages. Its district headquarters was located at the village of Tomioka.
- October 1, 1889 - With the establishment of the municipalities system in effect, Yana District consisted of 18 villages. The following towns and villages were implemented with the following mergers:
  - the village of Tomioka: the former villages of Tomioka, Kuroda, Obata and Nakauri
  - the village of Yamayoshida: the former villages of Kamiyoshida, Shimoyoshida, Takenowa (Takeyukiwa) and Koyanagino (Tsugeno)
  - the village of Ōno: the former villages of Ōno, Hosokawa, Mutsuhira (Mutsudaira), Ishiro, Notose, Nagoe (Nagoshi) and Myōgō
  - the village of Takaoka: the former villages of Isshiki and Suyama
  - the village of Norimoto was not affected by mergers due to the "single-village system" (or tandoku-mura-sei)
  - the village of Hiyoshi: the former villages of Hiyoshi and Yoshikawa
  - the village of Nagabe: the former villages of Ikuwada (Hitokuwada), Niwano and Yanai
  - the villages of Kamo and Kanazawa were not affected by mergers due to the "independent-hamlet system" (or dokiritsu-mura-sei)
  - the villages of Toyotsu, Hashio and Mikami were not affected by mergers due to the "independent-hamlet system" (or dokiritsu-mura-sei)
  - the village of Shimojō (Gejō): the former villages of Nishishimojō, Higashishimojō and Inunoko (Yukiko)
  - the village of Ushikawa (Gyūkawa) was not affected by mergers due to the "single-village system" (or tandoku-mura-sei)
  - the village of Miyone: the former villages of Miwa and Tame
  - the villages of Tamagawa (Tamekawa) and Takeyama (Suse) were not affected by mergers due to the "independent-hamlet system" (or dokiritsu-mura-sei)
  - the village of Nishigo (Saigō): the former villages of Hirano, Nakayama, Hagidaira (Hagihira), Onoda, Nishikawa and Magose (Magoshi)
- October 20 1890 - The village of Ōno was split off into the villages of Myōgō (Meigo), Nagoe (Nagoshi), Notose, Ishiro, Mutsuhira (Mutsudaira), Hosokawa and Ōno. (24 villages)
- April 1, 1891 - The establishment of the district/county system was implemented.
- April 18, 1892 - The village of Ōno gained town status. (1 town, 23 villages)
- December 23, 1892 - The village of Miyone was split off into the villages of Miwa and Yone. (1 town, 24 villages)
- July 1, 1906 - The following towns and villages were implemented with the following mergers: (1 town, 11 villages)
  - the village of Nanasato (Shichigo): the former villages of Takaoka, Myōgō, Nagoe (Nagoshi), Notose, Ishiro, Mutsuhira (Mutsudaira) and Hosokawa
  - the village of Funatsuki (Funachiki): the former villages of Norimoto and Hiyoshi
  - the village of Yana: the former villages of Nagabe and Tomioka
  - the village of Shimokawa: the former villages of Shimojō (Gejō) and Ushikawa
  - the village of Ishinomaki: the former villages of Tame, Miwa, Tamagawa (Tamakawa), Takayama (Suse) and Nishigo (Saigō)
- August 1, 1920 - The former villages of Toyotsu and Hashio were merged to form the village of Yamato. (1 town, 10 villages)
- April 1, 1923 - The district council was abolished, while the district office remained.
- July 1, 1926 - The district office was abolished, thus the area remained for geographic purposes.
- September 1, 1932 - The village of Shimokawa and parts of the village of Ishinomaki [the section of Tame] were merged into the city of Toyohashi. (1 town, 9 villages)
- April 1, 1951 - The former villages of Kanazawa and Kamo were merged to form the village of Sōwa. (1 town, 8 villages)
- April 1, 1954 - The village of Yamato was merged into the village of Ichinomiya (within Hoi District). (1 town, 7 villages)
- March 1, 1955 - The remaining parts of the village of Ishinomaki [the sections of Miwa, Tamagawa (Tamakawa), Takayama (Suse) and Nishigo (Saigō)] were merged into city of Toyohashi. (1 town, 6 villages)
- April 1, 1955 - The village of Sōwa was split off and annexed into neighboring municipalities: The section of Kamo was merged into the city of Toyohashi; while the section of Kanazawa was merged into the town of Ichinomiya (within Hoi District). (1 town, 5 villages)
- April 12, 1955 - The village of Mikami was merged into the city of Toyokawa. (1 town, 4 villages)
- April 15, 1955 - The villages of Funatsuke and Yana, along with the villages of Chisato and Togō (both from Minamishitara District), were merged into the town of Shinshiro (within Minamishitara District). (1 town, 2 villages)
- April 1, 1956 - The town of Ōno and the village of Nanasato (Shichigo) merged with the villages of Nagashino and Hōraiji (both from Minamishitara District) to form the town of Hōrai (within Minamishitara District). (1 village)
- September 30, 1956 - The village of Yamayoshida was merged into the town of Hōrai (within Minamishitara District). Therefore, Yana District was dissolved as a result of this merger. This was the first district from Aichi Prefecture to dissolve since the inception of the establishment of reorganization of districts in 1878; with the exception of Kaitō and Kaisei Districts, which both dissolved in 1913 to form Ama District.

== See also ==
- List of dissolved districts of Japan
