= Goyu-shuku =

Thirty-fifth of the 53 stations of the Tōkaidō

Coordinates: 34.8126°N 137.3165°E

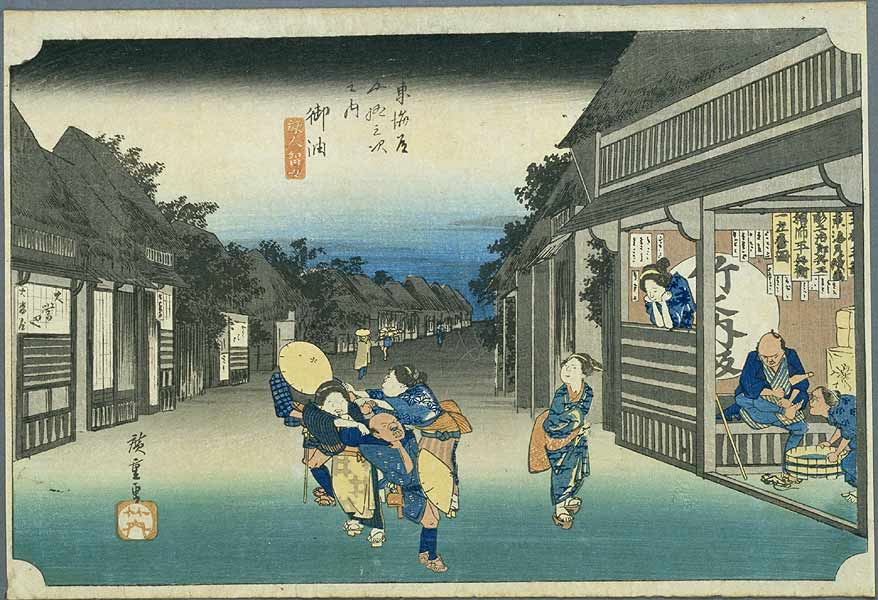
Goyu-shuku in the 1830s, as depicted by Hiroshige in the Hōeidō edition of The Fifty-three Stations of the Tōkaidō 1831–1834)

Goyu-shuku (御油宿, Goyu-shuku) was the thirty-fifth of the fifty-three stations of the Tōkaidō. It is located in Goyu-chō in the city of Toyokawa, Aichi Prefecture, Japan. A pine tree colonnade, one of the few remnants from the Edo period post town, is a well-known tourist spot. It was approximately 10.4 kilometres (6.5 mi) from Yoshida-juku, the preceding post station.

== History ==
Goyu-shuku was established in 1601, at the behest of Tokugawa Ieyasu. At its most prosperous, there were four honjin in the post town, though there were never less than two at any point. The classic ukiyo-e print by Andō Hiroshige (Hōeidō edition) from 1831 to 1834 depicts the main street of the post town at dusk, with aggressive female touts (for which the post station was infamous) attempting to drag travellers into teahouses and inns for the night.

During the Meiji Restoration, the central office for the Hoi District, making it the center of the district. However, when the Tōkaidō Main Line was laid down and bypassed Goyu-shuku, it did not receive the same prosperity as Mito and Gamagōri.

Later, when Nagoya Railroad laid down what was to become the Meitetsu Nagoya Main Line, a train station was opened in former Goyu-shuku. The prosperity that the town had before the Meiji Restoration, however, did not return, because express trains did not stop at the station. This eventually led to the district's offices and police stations being moved to the nearby Kō-chō area of Toyokawa.

In 1959, the former town of Goyu merged with the city of Toyokawa.

== Neighboring post towns ==
Tōkaidō
Yoshida-juku - Goyu-shuku - Akasaka-juku
