= Tsukude =

Former village in Aichi Prefecture, Japan

Tsukude 作手村
- Former municipality
- Flag Seal

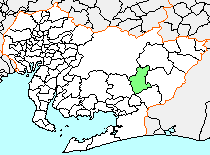
- Location of Tsukude in Aichi Prefecture

- Location in Japan
- Coordinates: 34°58′25″N 137°25′34″E
- Country: Japan
- Region: Chūbu (Tōkai)
- Prefecture: Aichi Prefecture
- District: Minamishitara
- Merged: October 1, 2005 (now part of Shinshiro)

Area
  - Total: 117.4 km^{2} (45.3 sq mi)

Population (September 1, 2005)
  - Total: 3,263
  - Density: 27.8/km^{2} (72/sq mi)
- Time zone: UTC+09:00 (JST)
- Symbols
- Flower: Habenaria radiata
- Tree: Sciadopitys

Tsukude (作手村, Tsukude-mura) was a village in Minamishitara District, Aichi Prefecture, Japan. It was established on May 1, 1906, through the merger of nine predecessor villages, and dissolved on October 1, 2005, when it merged with Hōrai town and the former Shinshiro city to form the new expanded city of Shinshiro. The merger dissolved Minamishitara District.

== Geography ==
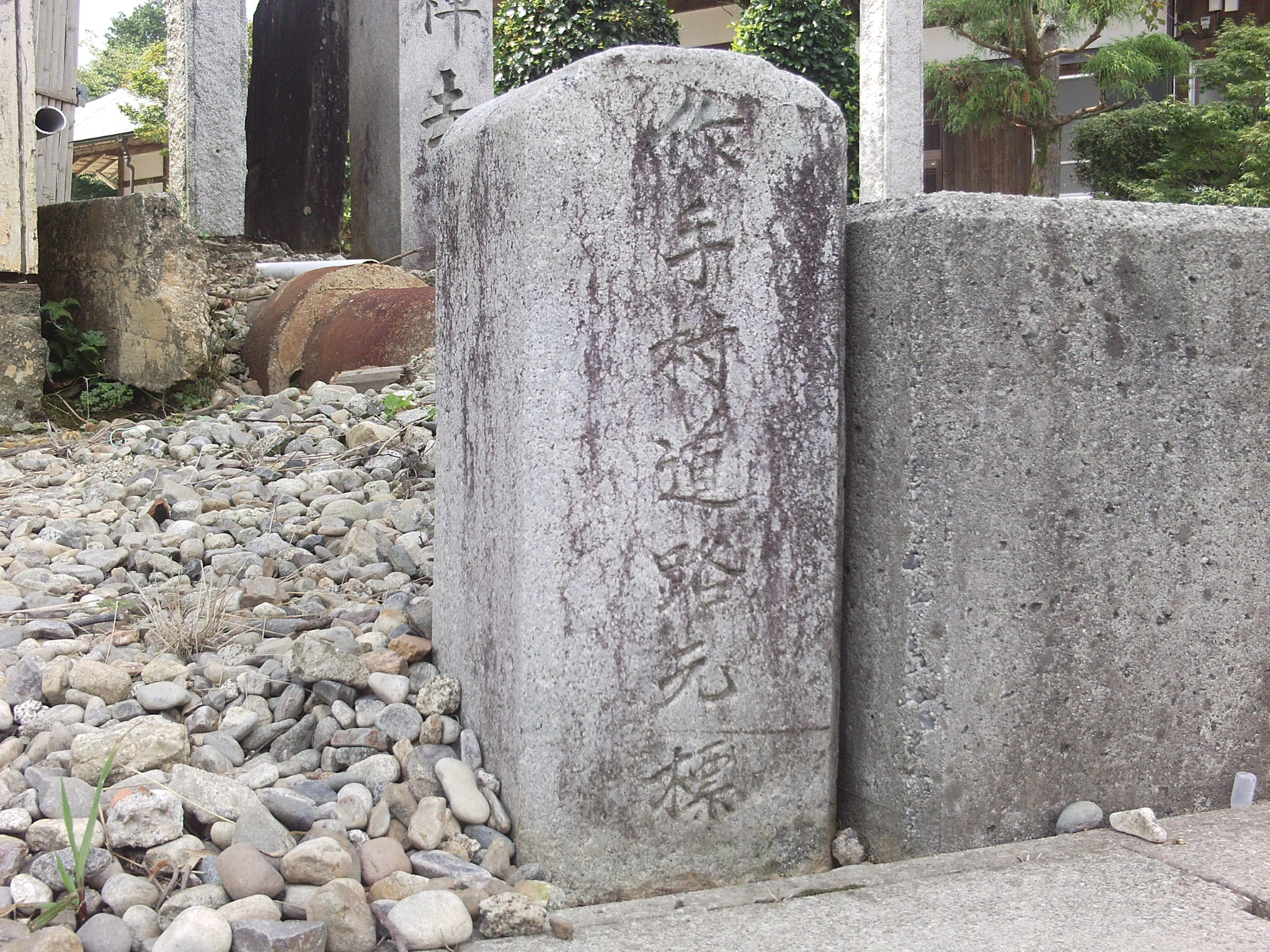
The kilometre zero marker of Tsukude

Tsukude occupied a highland basin in the east-central part of Aichi Prefecture at an average elevation of approximately 550 metres. The northern portion of the village fell within the Aichi Kōgen Quasi-National Park; the southwestern portion fell within Hongusan Prefectural Natural Park.

== History ==
=== Sengoku period ===
During the Sengoku period, the Okudaira clan — a kokujin (local lord) family — controlled the area from Tsukude Castle in Mikawa Province. Following the death of Takeda Shingen in 1573, clan leader Okudaira Nobumasa led his men out of Tsukude Castle and rejoined the Tokugawa clan, ending Takeda influence in the region.

=== Edo period ===
Early in the Edo period, Tsukude Domain was created in 1602 when Matsudaira Tadaaki of the Okudaira-Matsudaira line received a fief at Tsukude, bringing his total holding to 17,000 koku. Tadaaki was the domain's sole lord; it was dissolved in 1610 when he transferred to Ise-Kameyama Domain.

=== Modern period ===
Modern Tsukude village was created on May 1, 1906, through the merger of nine predecessor villages in Minamishitara District.

On October 1, 2005, Tsukude was dissolved in a shinsetsu gappei (新設合併) — a merger in which all constituent municipalities are dissolved and a new entity is created — together with Hōrai town and the former Shinshiro city, forming the new Shinshiro city. The merger also dissolved Minamishitara District.

== Natural heritage ==
A kōyamaki (Sciadopitys verticillata) at Kansenji temple (甘泉寺) in the Tsukude district was designated a National Natural Monument on May 26, 1972. Kōyamaki was the designated village tree of Tsukude.
