= Ichinomiya, Aichi (town) =

Ichinomiya 一宮町
- Former municipality
- Flag Emblem

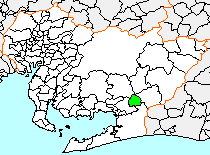
- Location of Ichinomiya in Aichi Prefecture

- Location in Japan
- Coordinates: 34°51′10″N 137°25′34″E
- Country: Japan
- Region: Chūbu (Tōkai)
- Prefecture: Aichi Prefecture
- District: Hoi
- Merged: February 1, 2006 (now part of Toyokawa)

Area
  - Total: 36.61 km^{2} (14.14 sq mi)

Population (January 1, 2006)
  - Total: 16,440
  - Density: 449/km^{2} (1,160/sq mi)
- Time zone: UTC+09:00 (JST)
- Symbols
- Flower: Azalea
- Tree: Osmanthus

Ichinomiya (一宮町, Ichinomiya-chō) was a town located in Hoi District, east-central Aichi Prefecture, Japan.

As of January 1, 2006, the town had an estimated population of 16,440 and a population density of 449 persons per km². Its total area was 36.61 km².

The town was often called as Mikawaichinomiya to avoid confusion with the much larger city of Ichinomiya in former Owari Province.

== History ==
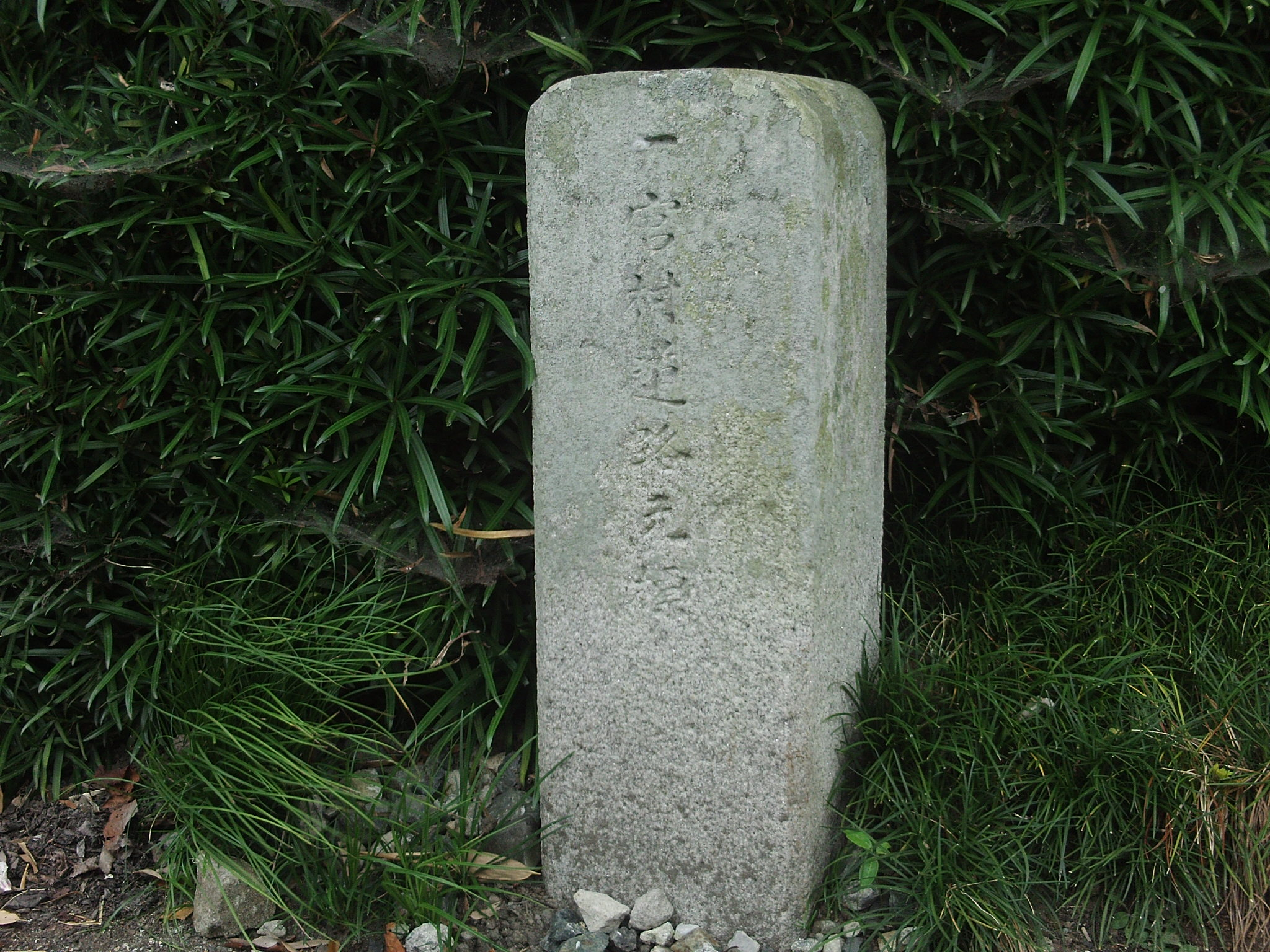
The Kilometre Zero of Ichinomiya

Ichinomiya was named after the Ichinomiya of Mikawa Province, the Toga Shrine.

=== Formation and mergers ===
- On July 1, 1906 - Modern Ichinomiya village was created through the merger of two small hamlets.
- In 1954 - Ichinomiya annexed the village of Yamato (from neighboring Yana District).
- On April 1, 1961 - The village of Ichinomiya was elevated to town status to become the town of Ichinomiya.
- On February 1, 2006 - Ichinomiya was merged into the expanded city of Toyokawa and has ceased to exist as an independent municipality.
