= Chiryū-juku =

Thirty-ninth of the 53 stations of the Tōkaidō

Coordinates: 35.008°N 137.041°E

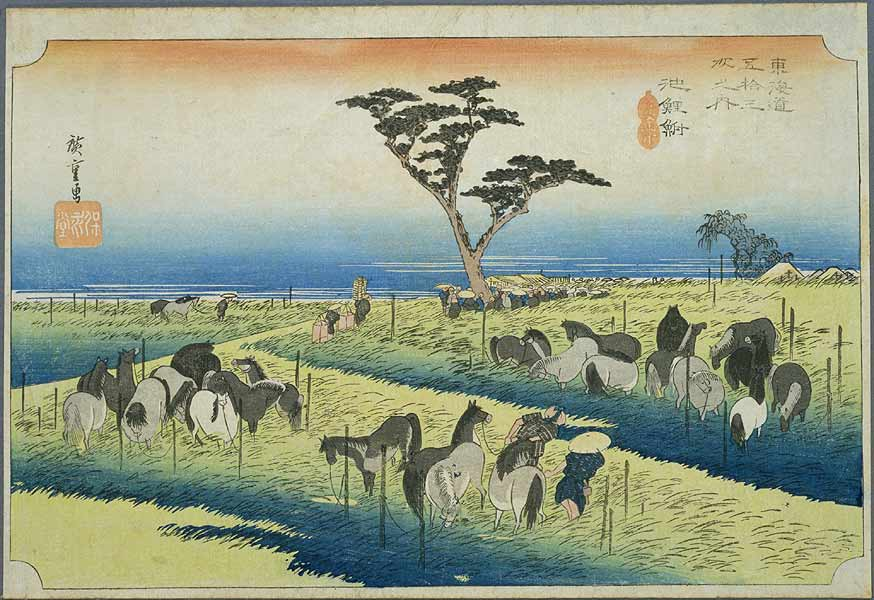
Chiryū-juku in the 1830s, as depicted by Hiroshige in the Hōeidō edition of The Fifty-three Stations of the Tōkaidō (1831–1834)

Chiryū-juku (池鯉鮒宿, Chiryū-shuku) was the thirty-ninth of the fifty-three stations of the Tōkaidō. It is located in the present-day city of Chiryū in Aichi Prefecture, Japan. It was the westernmost post town in Mikawa Province, and was 330 kilometres (210 mi) from Nihonbashi, the start of the Tōkaidō, so it took approximately 10 days to for average travellers to reach.

== History ==
Chiryū-juku was noted for a famed Shinto shrine, the Chiryū Daimyōjin, and also for its flourishing horse market, held in late April to early May of each year. Tokugawa Ieyasu ordered that the post station plant pine trees along through route of the highway before and after the town. The classic ukiyo-e print by Andō Hiroshige (Hōeidō edition) from 1831 to 1834 depicts horses, and also one of the pine trees. Hiroshige entitled the work Summer Horse Market (首夏馬市, Shuka Umaichi). Despite the construction of railroads following the Meiji restoration the horse market continued into the Shōwa period, and most of the pine trees survived until the 1959 Isewan Typhoon.

== Neighboring post towns ==
Tōkaidō
Okazaki-shuku - Chiryū-juku - Narumi-juku
