= Mito, Aichi =

Mito 御津町
- Former municipality
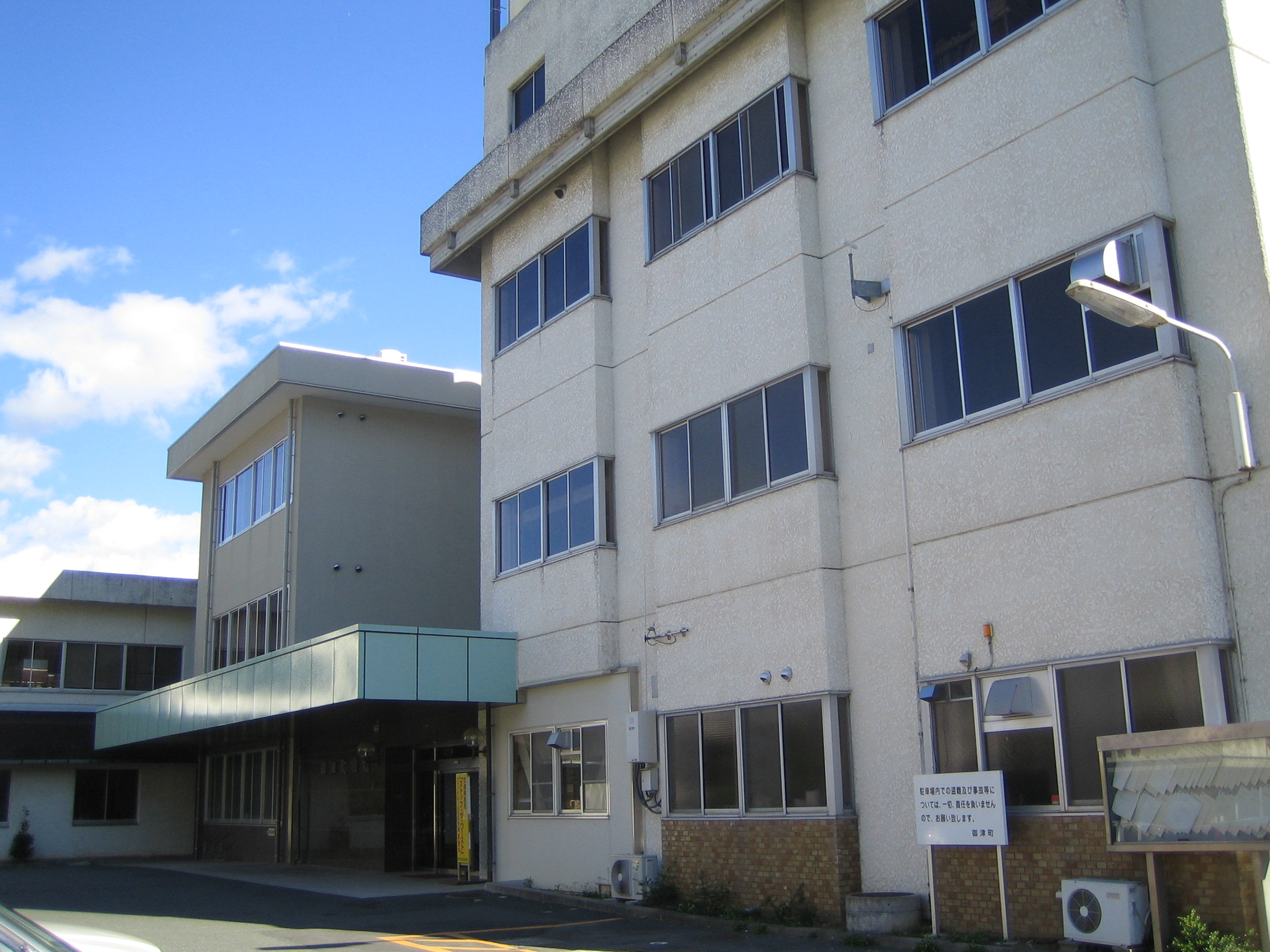
- Mito Town Office

- Flag Emblem

- Location of Mito in Aichi Prefecture

- Location in Japan
- Coordinates: 34°49′N 137°19′E
- Country: Japan
- Region: Chūbu (Tōkai)
- Prefecture: Aichi Prefecture
- District: Hoi
- Merged: January 15, 2008 (now part of Toyokawa)

Area
  - Total: 18.73 km^{2} (7.23 sq mi)

Population (November 1, 2007)
  - Total: 13,536
  - Density: 722.69/km^{2} (1,871.8/sq mi)
- Time zone: UTC+09:00 (JST)
- Website: City of Toyokawa
- Symbols
- Flower: Dwarf azalea
- Tree: Japanese Black Pine

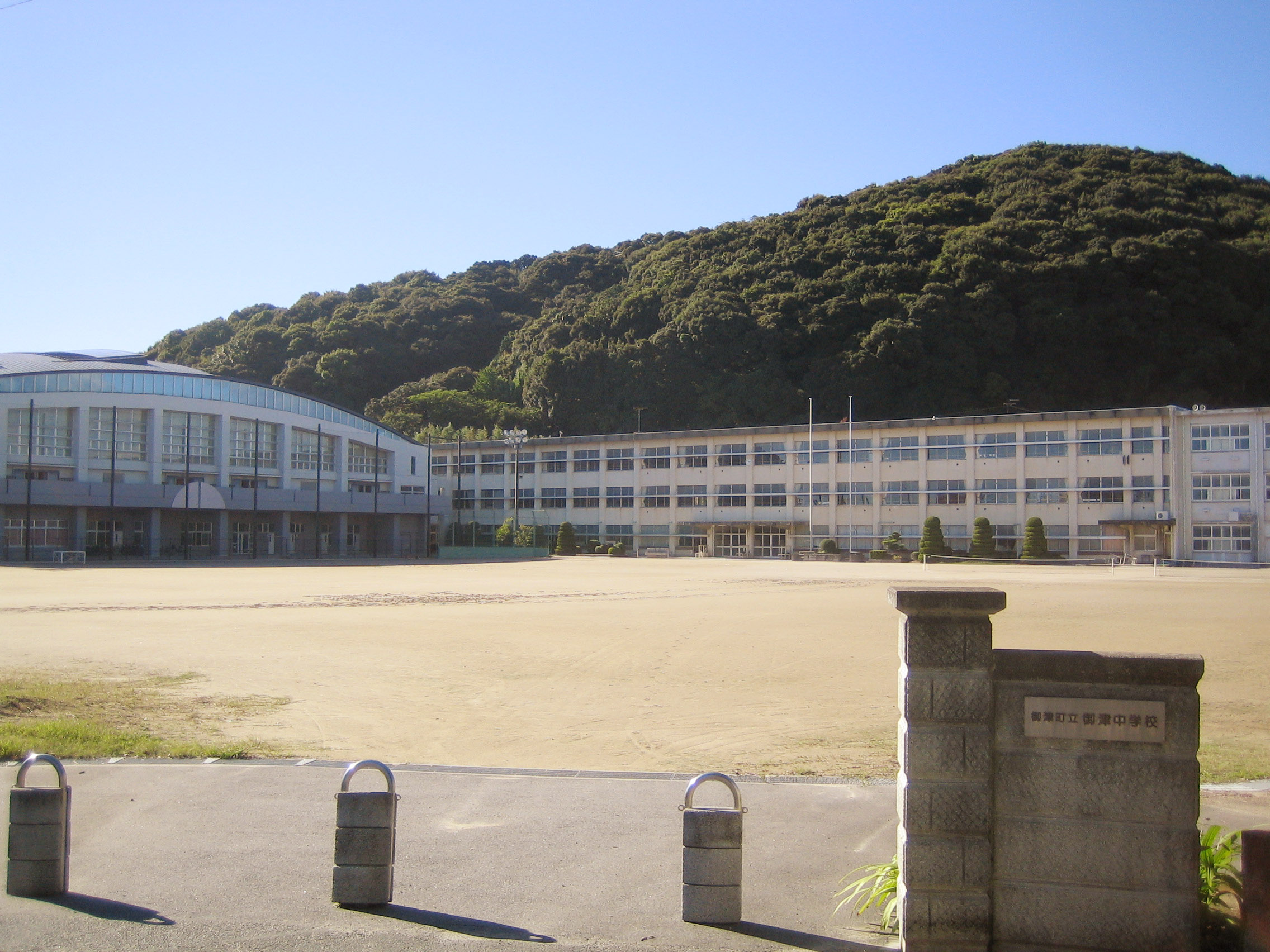
Mito Junior High School

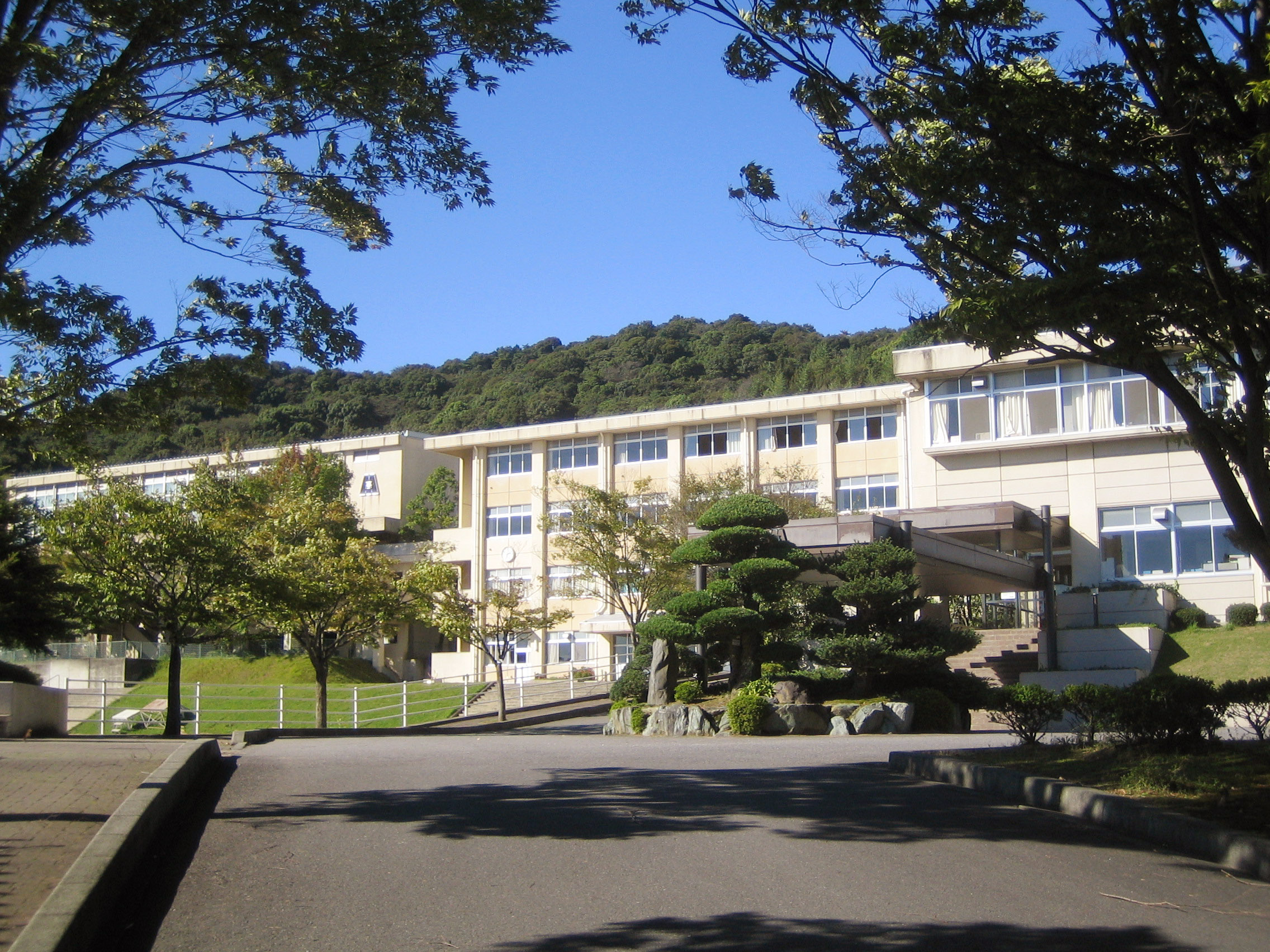
Mito High School

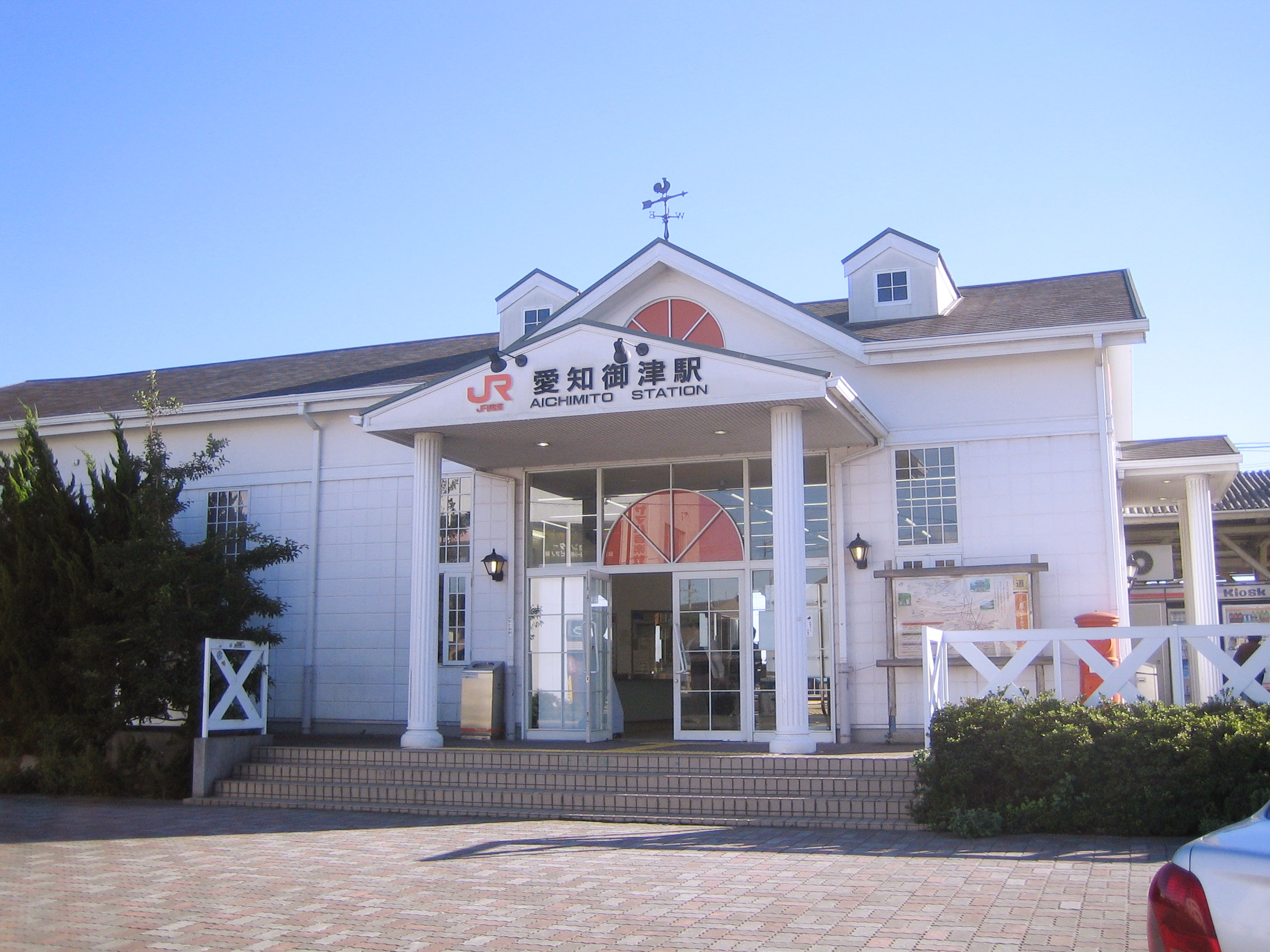
Aichi-Mito Station

Mito (御津町, Mito-chō) was a town located in Hoi District, Aichi Prefecture, Japan.

On January 15, 2008, Mito, along with the town of Otowa (also from Hoi District), was merged into the expanded city of Toyokawa.

As of 2007 (the last data available prior to the merger), the town had an estimated population of 13,536 and a population density of 722.69 persons per km^{2}. The total area was 18.73 km^{2}.

== History ==
The area around Mito has been settled since prehistoric times, and archaeologists have found numerous remains from the Jōmon, Yayoi and Kofun periods.

- 1930: Mito Town was founded.
- 1939: Symbol of Mito was adopted.
- 1947: Mito Junior High School was founded. Goyu Station changed its name to Aichi-Mito Station.
- 1976: New town office was completed.
- 1979: Crematory was completed.
- 1980: Ceremony to celebrate the 50th anniversary of the founding of Mito Town was held.
- 1986: Mito High School was founded.
- 1992: Mt. Mito promenade (御津山遊歩道) was completed. Water purification plant was completed.
- 1995: Heartful Hall was completed.
- 1996: The first Mito Festival (みとまつり Mito Matsuri) was held.
- 2000: Welfare and Health Center opened.
- October 2, 2007: Mito Town Library opened in the Heartful Hall.
- January 15, 2008: Mito Town, along with Otowa Town (also from Hoi District), was merged into the expanded Toyokawa City.

== Region ==
=== Education ===
==== Primary schools ====
- Mito Nanbu Primary School
- Mito Hokubu Primary School

==== Junior High school ====
- Mito Junior High School

==== High school ====
- Mito High School (御津高校)

=== Social education ===
==== Ceremony Hall ====
- Heartful Hall

==== Library ====
- Mito Town Library

== Transportation ==
=== Railway ===
- Central Japan Railway Company
  - Tōkaidō Main Line - Aichi-Mito Station
- Nagoya Railroad
  - Meitetsu Nagoya Main Line - Odabuchi Station (This station is located in Toyokawa, but it is near to Kamisawaki, Mito)

=== Road ===
- National highway- Route 1

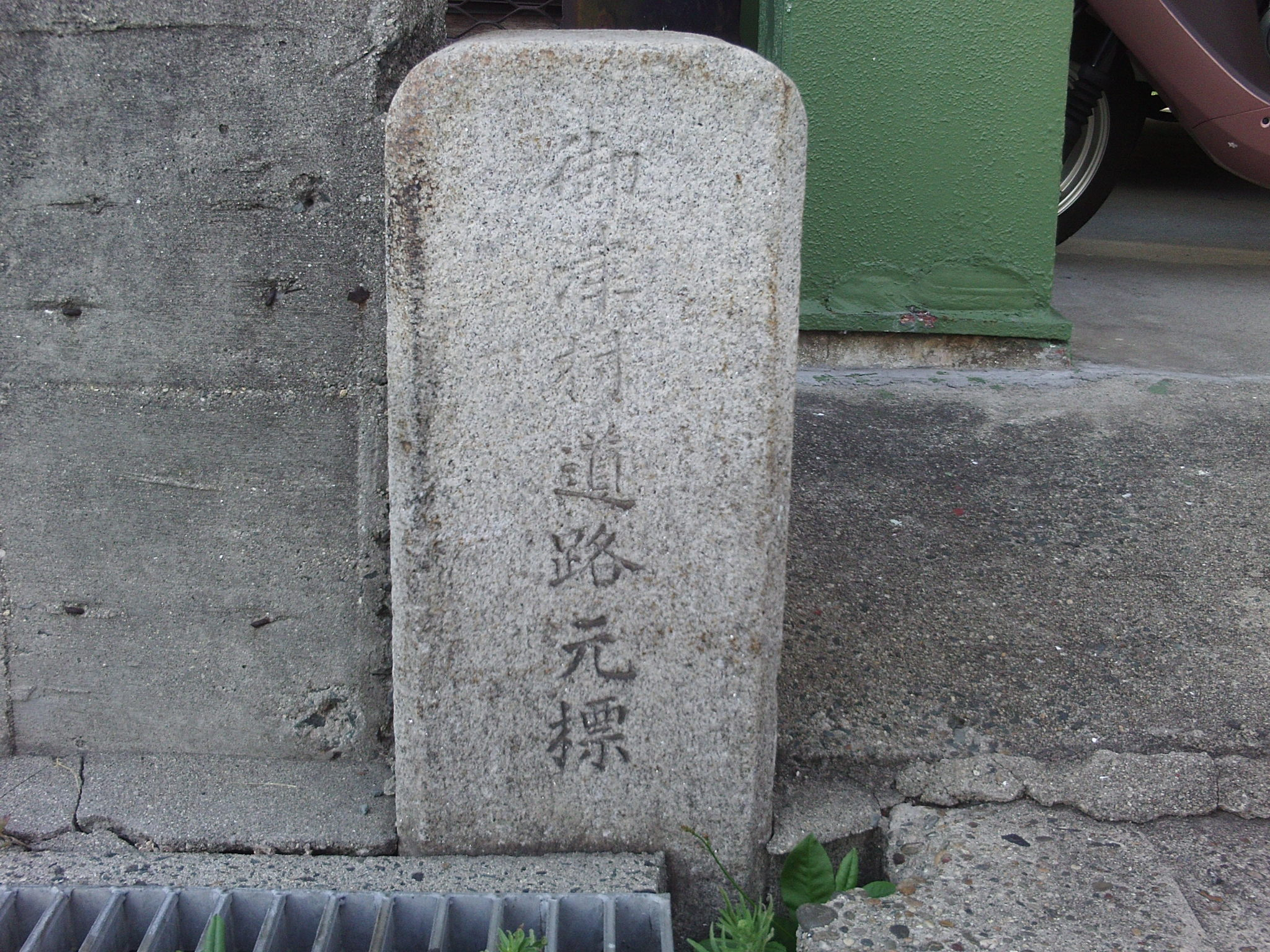
The Kilometre Zero of Mito

=== Bus ===
- Meitetsu Tohbu Kanko (Sunrise Bus) - Toyohashi Line

== Local attractions ==
- Daionji Temple (大恩寺)
- Mt. Mito (御津山)
- Miyukihama (御幸浜)
- Ruins of the Takemoto Castle (竹本城址)
- Mikawa Coastal Green Tract (三河臨海緑地)
- Mikawa-Mito Marina (三河御津マリーナ)

== Noted persons from Mito ==
- Kayoko Ohara (小原 佳代子) - Nankai Broadcasting's announcer
