= Yoshida-juku =

Thirty-fourth of the 53 stations of the Tōkaidō

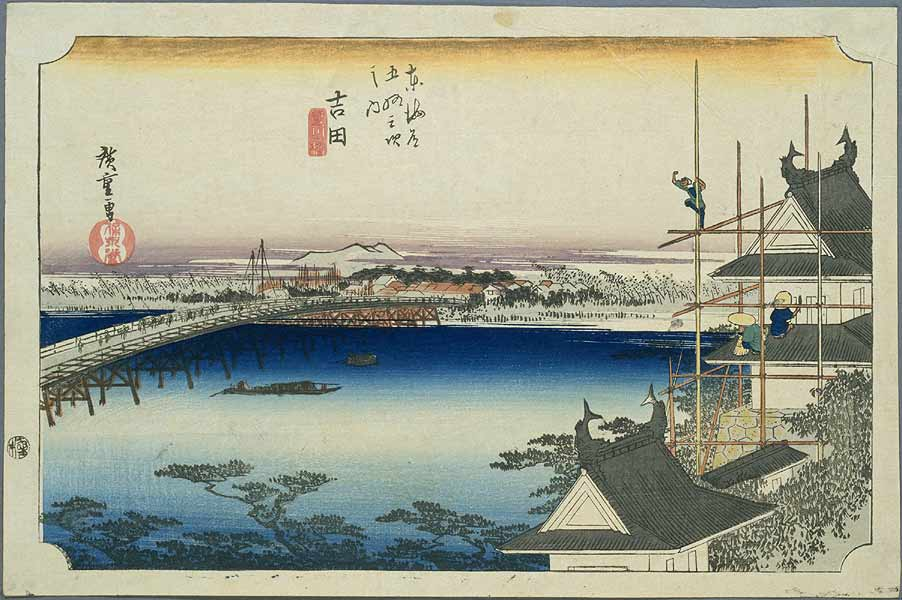
Yoshida-juku in the 1830s, as depicted by Hiroshige in the Hōeidō edition of The Fifty-three Stations of the Tōkaidō 1831–1834)

Yoshida-juku (吉田宿, Yoshida-juku) was the thirty-fourth of the fifty-three stations of the Tōkaidō. It is located in the center of what is now the city of Toyohashi, Aichi Prefecture, Japan. It was 287 kilometres (178 mi) from the start of the route in Edo's Nihonbashi and 6.1 kilometres (3.8 mi) from Futagawa-juku to the east and 10.5 kilometres (6.5 mi) from Goyu-shuku to the west.

== History ==
Yoshida-juku was established in 1601 as a post station within the castle town surrounding Yoshida Castle, an important feudal domain and port town in Mikawa Province. Yoshida had a bridge which crossed the Toyokawa River. This was one of the few bridges permitted on the Tōkaidō by the Tokugawa shogunate. One the larger post stations on the Tōkaidō, it stretched for 2.6 kilometers along the highway, and in a census taken in 1802, there were two honjin, one waki-honjin and 65 hatago to serve the travelers. The town as a whole consisted of approximately 1,000 buildings and had a population of 5,000 to 7,000 people. As with neighboring Goyu-shuku and Fukagawa-juku, it had a reputation for its meshimori onna.

The classic ukiyo-e print by Andō Hiroshige (Hōeidō edition) from 1831–1834 depicts the famous bridge at Yoshida, as well as Yoshida Castle.

== Neighboring post towns ==
Tōkaidō
Futagawa-juku - Yoshida-juku - Goyu-shuku
