= Aichi-Mito Station =

Railway station in Toyokawa, Aichi Prefecture, Japan

CA44 Aichi-Mito Station 愛知御津駅
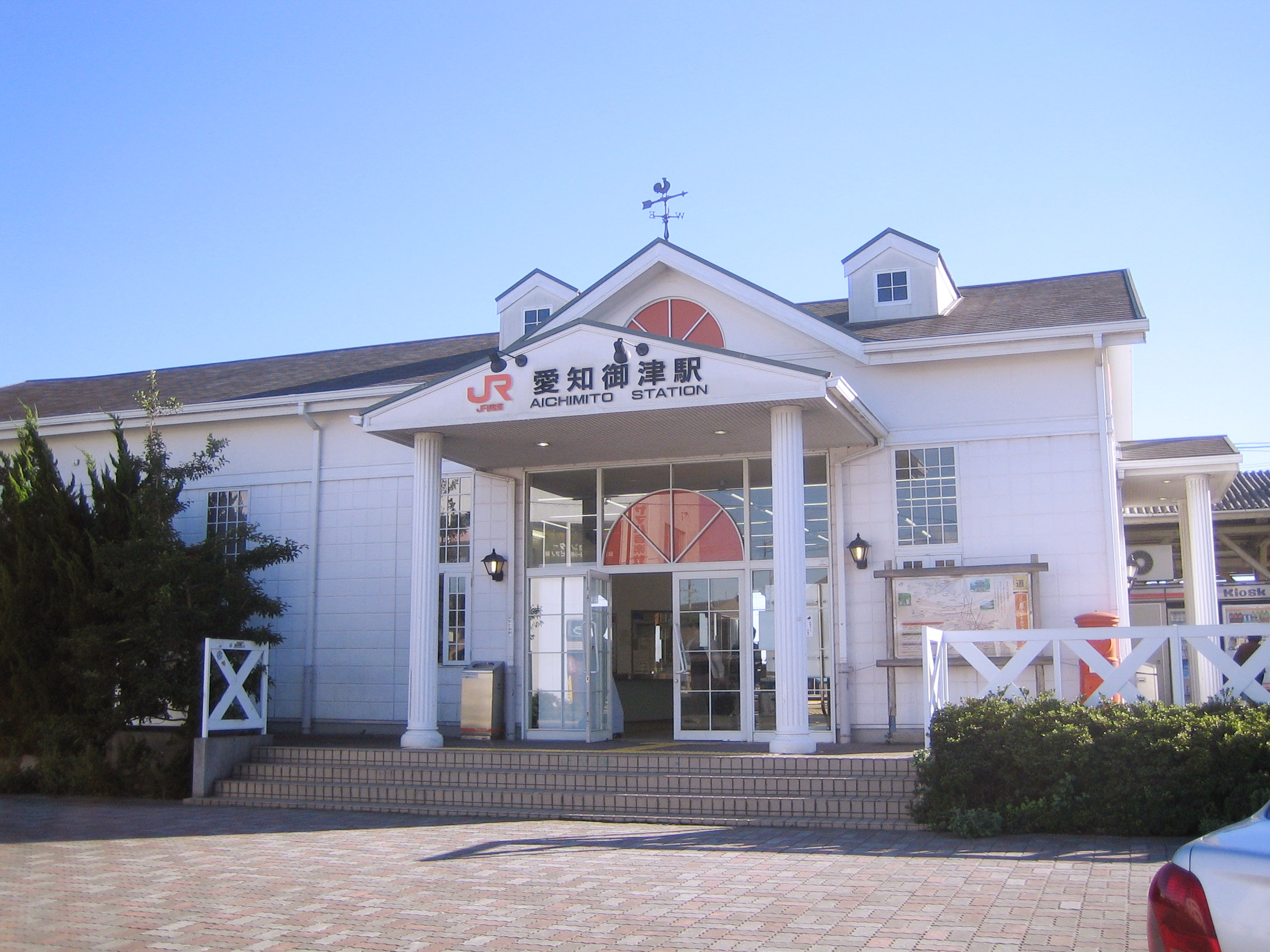
- Aichi-Mito Station, October 2006

General information
- Location: Matsumoto Mitocho Nishigata, Toyokawa-shi, Aichi-ken 441-0312; Japan
- Coordinates: 34.8126°N 137.3165°E
- Operator: JR Central
- Line: Tōkaidō Main Line
- Distance: 302.1 kilometers from Tokyo
- Platforms: 1 side + 1 island platform

Other information
- Status: Staffed
- Station code: CA44

History
- Opened: September 1, 1888
- Former names: Goyu (until 1948)

Passengers
- 2023–2024: 2,434 daily
Location
- Location within Aichi Prefecture Location within Japan

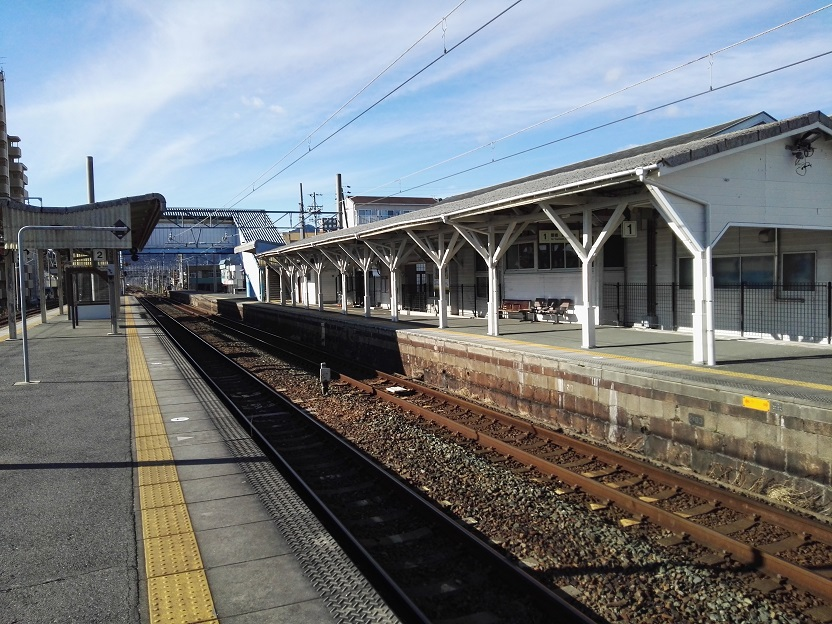
Platform

Aichi-Mito Station (愛知御津駅, Aichi-Mito-eki) is a railway station in the city of Toyokawa, Aichi Prefecture, Japan, operated by Central Japan Railway Company (JR Tōkai).

== Lines ==
Aichi-Mito Station is served by the Tōkaidō Main Line, and is located 302.1 kilometers from the southern terminus of the line at Tokyo Station.

== Station layout ==
The station has one side platform and one island platform connected by a footbridge. The station building has automated ticket machines, TOICA automated turnstiles and is staffed.

=== Platforms ===
1	■ Tōkaidō Main Line	For Toyohashi・Hamamatsu
2	■ Tōkaidō Main Line	For express trains
3	■ Tōkaidō Main Line	For Okazaki・Nagoya

== Adjacent stations ==
«	Service	»
Central Japan Railway Company
Tōkaidō Main Line
Special Rapid: Does not stop at this station
New Rapid: Does not stop at this station
Rapid: Does not stop at this station
Sectional Rapid: Does not stop at this station
Nishi-Kozakai	Local	Mikawa-Otsuka

== Station history ==
Aichi-Mito Station first opened on September 1, 1888, as Goyu Station (御油駅, Goyu-eki) when the section of the Japanese Government Railways (JGR) line connecting Hamamatsu with Ōbu was completed. From April 1, 1895, this became the Tōkaidō Main Line. The station was burned down during the Toyokawa Air Raid of 1945, and a new station building was completed in April 1948. The JGR became the JNR after World War II and on August 1, 1948, the station name was changed to its present name. Regularly scheduled freight services were discontinued in 1971, and parcel services by 1984. With the dissolution and privatization of the JNR on April 1, 1987, the station came under the control of the Central Japan Railway Company (JR Tōkai). Automated turnstiles using the TOICA IC Card system came into operation from November 18, 2001.

Station numbering was introduced to the section of the Tōkaidō Line operated JR Central in March 2018; Aichi-Mito Station was assigned station number CA44.

== Passenger statistics ==
In fiscal 2017, the station was used by an average of 1362 passengers daily.

== Surrounding area ==
- former Mito Town Hall
- Mito Junior High School

== See also ==
- List of railway stations in Japan
