= Mikawa-Ōtsuka Station =

Railway station in Gamagōri, Aichi Prefecture, Japan

CA45 Mikawa-Ōtsuka Station 三河大塚駅
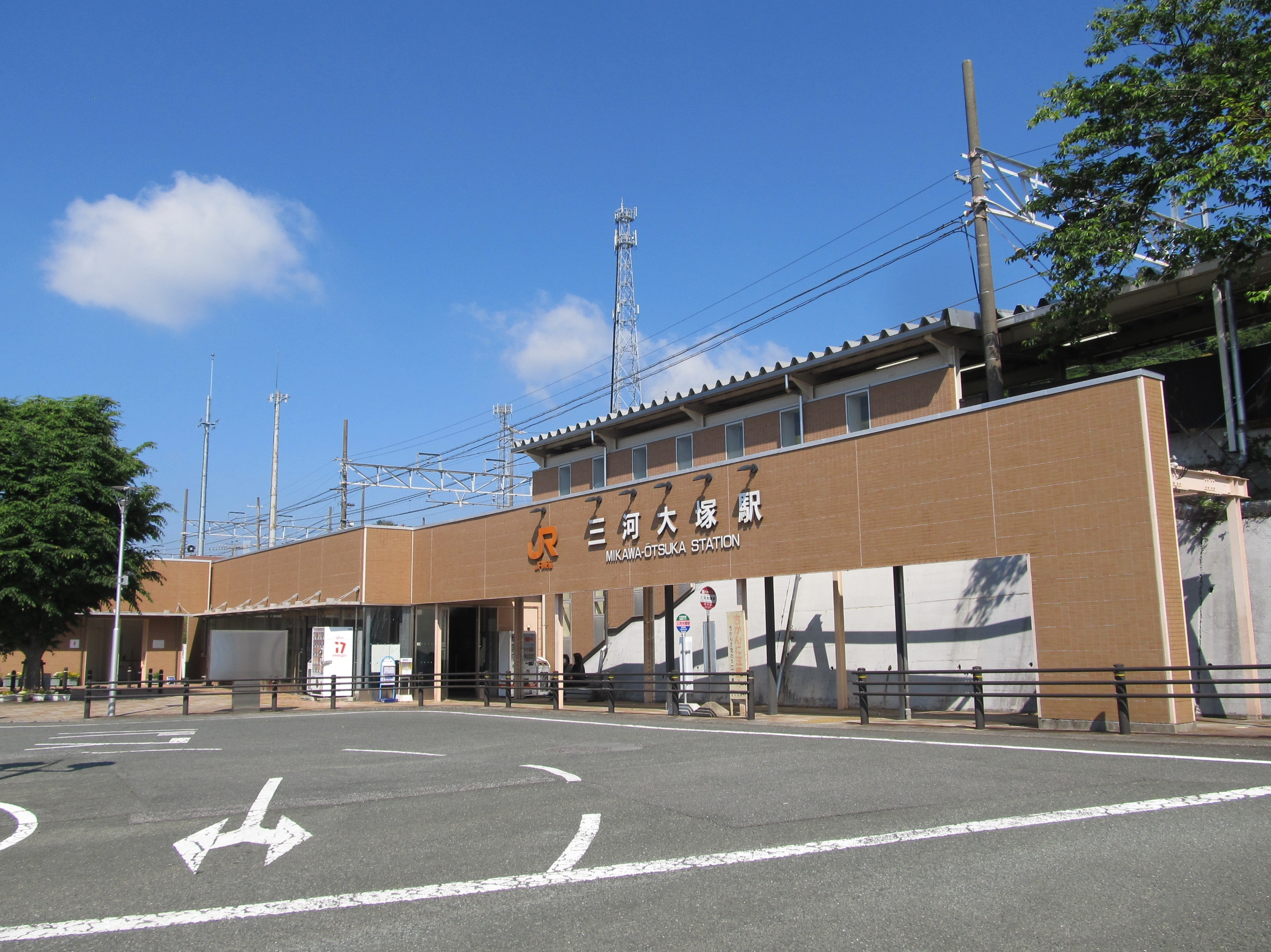
- Mikawa-Ōtsuka Station in May 2022

General information
- Location: 22-1 Sasako Ōtsuka-chō, Gamagori-shi, Aichi-ken 443-0013; Japan
- Coordinates: 34°48′56.11″N 137°16′57.65″E
- Operator: JR Central
- Line: Tokaido Main Line
- Distance: 305.2 kilometers from Tokyo
- Platforms: 2 side platforms

Other information
- Status: Unstaffed
- Station code: CA45

Passengers
- 2023–2024: 2,254 daily
Location
- Location within Aichi Prefecture Location within Japan

Mikawa-Ōtsuka Station (三河大塚駅, Mikawa-Ōtsuka-eki) is a railway station in the city of Gamagōri, Aichi Prefecture, Japan, operated by Central Japan Railway Company (JR Tōkai).

== Lines ==
Mikawa-Ōtsuka Station is served by the Tōkaidō Main Line, and is located 305.2 kilometers from the starting point of the line at Tokyo Station.

== Station layout ==
The station has two opposed side platforms connected to the elevated station building by a footbridge. The station building has automated ticket machines, TOICA automated turnstiles and is unattended.

=== Platforms ===
1	■ Tōkaidō Main Line	For Okazaki, Nagoya
2	■ Tōkaidō Main Line	For Toyohashi, Hamamatsu

== Adjacent stations ==
«	Service	»
Central Japan Railway Company
Tōkaidō Main Line
Special Rapid: Does not stop at this station
New Rapid: Does not stop at this station
Rapid: Does not stop at this station
Sectional Rapid: Does not stop at this station
Aichi-Mito	Local	Mikawa-Miya

== Station history ==
Mikawa-Ōtsuka Station was opened on July 28, 1953, as a station of the JNR (Japan National Railway), however, its station building was not completed until June 24, 1954. The platforms were lengthened, and a new station building was completed on August 6, 1965. With the dissolution and privatization of the JNR on April 1, 1987, the station came under the control of the Central Japan Railway Company. A new station building was completed on July 20, 2005.

Station numbering was introduced to the section of the Tōkaidō Line operated JR Central in March 2018; Mikawa-Ōtsuka Station was assigned station number CA45.

== Passenger statistics ==
In fiscal 2017, the station was used by an average of 1266 passengers daily (boarding passengers only).

== Surrounding area ==
- Ōtsuka Elementary School
- Ōtsuka Junior High School
- Japan National Route 23
- Gamagōri Higashi High School

== See also ==
- List of railway stations in Japan
