= Nishi-Kozakai Station =

Railway station in Toyokawa, Aichi Prefecture, Japan

CA43 Nishi-Kozakai Station 西小坂井駅
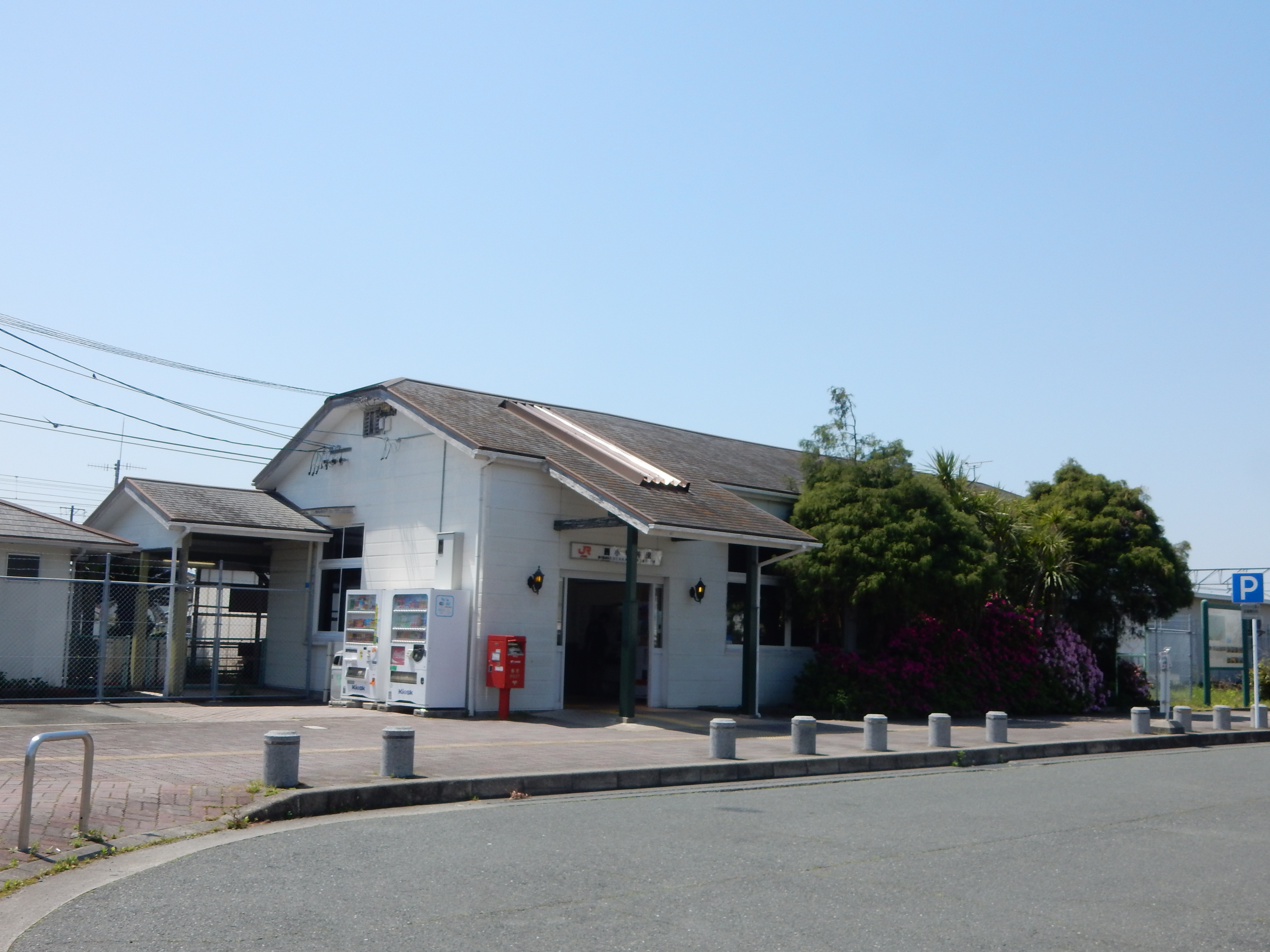
- Nishi-Kozakai Station, April 2018

General information
- Location: Maeyama-20 Inachō, Toyokawa-shi, Aichi-ken 441-0105; Japan
- Coordinates: 34°47′51″N 137°21′7″E
- Operator: JR Central
- Line: Tōkaidō Main Line
- Distance: 298.4 kilometers from Tokyo
- Platforms: 2 island platforms

Other information
- Status: Staffed
- Station code: CA43

History
- Opened: August 1, 1948

Passengers
- 2023–2024: 2,016 daily
Location
- Location within Aichi Prefecture Location within Japan

Nishi-Kozakai Station (西小坂井駅, Nishi-Kozakai-eki) is a railway station in the city of Toyokawa, Aichi Prefecture, Japan, operated by Central Japan Railway Company (JR Tōkai).

== Lines ==
Nishi-Kozakai Station is served by the Tōkaidō Main Line, and is located 298.4 kilometers from the southern terminus of the line at Tokyo Station.

== Station layout ==
The station has two island platforms connected to the station building by a footbridge; however, track 1 is not in use. The station building has automated ticket machines, TOICA automated turnstiles and is staffed.

=== Platforms ===
| 2 | ■ Tōkaidō Main Line | For Toyohashi・Hamamatsu |
| 3 | ■ Tōkaidō Main Line | For Okazaki・Nagoya |
| 4 | ■ Tōkaidō Main Line | For Okazaki・Nagoya |

== Adjacent stations ==
| « | Service | » |
Central Japan Railway Company
Tōkaidō Main Line
Special Rapid: Does not stop at this station
New Rapid: Does not stop at this station
Rapid: Does not stop at this station
Sectional Rapid: Does not stop at this station
| Toyohashi | Local | Aichi-Mito |

== Station history ==
Nishi-Kozakai Station began operations on June 10, 1945 as Nishi-Ina Signal (西伊奈信号場, Nishi-Ina-shingō-shō) on the Tōkaidō Main Line. It was elevated to a full station under its present name on August 1, 1948. Regularly scheduled freight services were discontinued in 1972, and parcel services by 1984. With the dissolution and privatization of the JNR on April 1, 1987, the station came under the control of the Central Japan Railway Company (JR Tōkai). Automated turnstiles using the TOICA IC Card system came into operation from November 25, 2006.

Station numbering was introduced to the section of the Tōkaidō Line operated JR Central in March 2018; Nishi-Kozakai Station was assigned station number CA43.

== Passenger statistics ==
In fiscal 2017, the station was used by an average of 1213 passengers daily.

== Surrounding area ==
- site of Ushikubo Castle
- Ushikubo Elementary School

== See also ==
- List of railway stations in Japan
