= Akasaka-juku (Tōkaidō) =

Thirty-sixth of the 53 stations of the Tōkaidō

Coordinates: 34.857°N 137.308°E

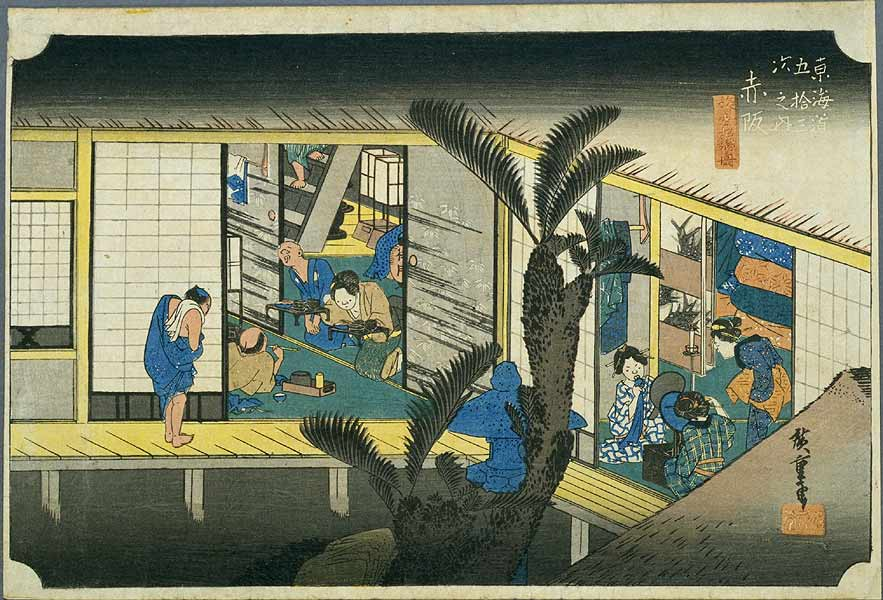
Akasaka-juku in the 1830s, as depicted by Hiroshige in the Hoeido edition of The Fifty-three Stations of the Tōkaidō (1831–1834)

Akasaka-juku (赤坂宿, Akasaka-juku) was the thirty-sixth of the fifty-three stations of the Tōkaidō. It is located in present-day Toyokawa, Aichi Prefecture, Japan. It was only 1.7 kilometres (1.1 mi) from Goyu-juku, the preceding post station.

== History ==
Along with the preceding Yoshida-juku and Goyu-shuku, Akasaka-juku was well known for its meshimori onna. The classic ukiyo-e print by Andō Hiroshige (Hoeido edition) from 1831–1834 depicts a typical inn; the scene is divided in half by a sago palm in the center. To the right, travellers are taking their evening meal, and to the left, prostitutes are putting on make-up and preparing for the evening entertainment. Due to its reputation, Akasaka was a popular post station with many travellers.

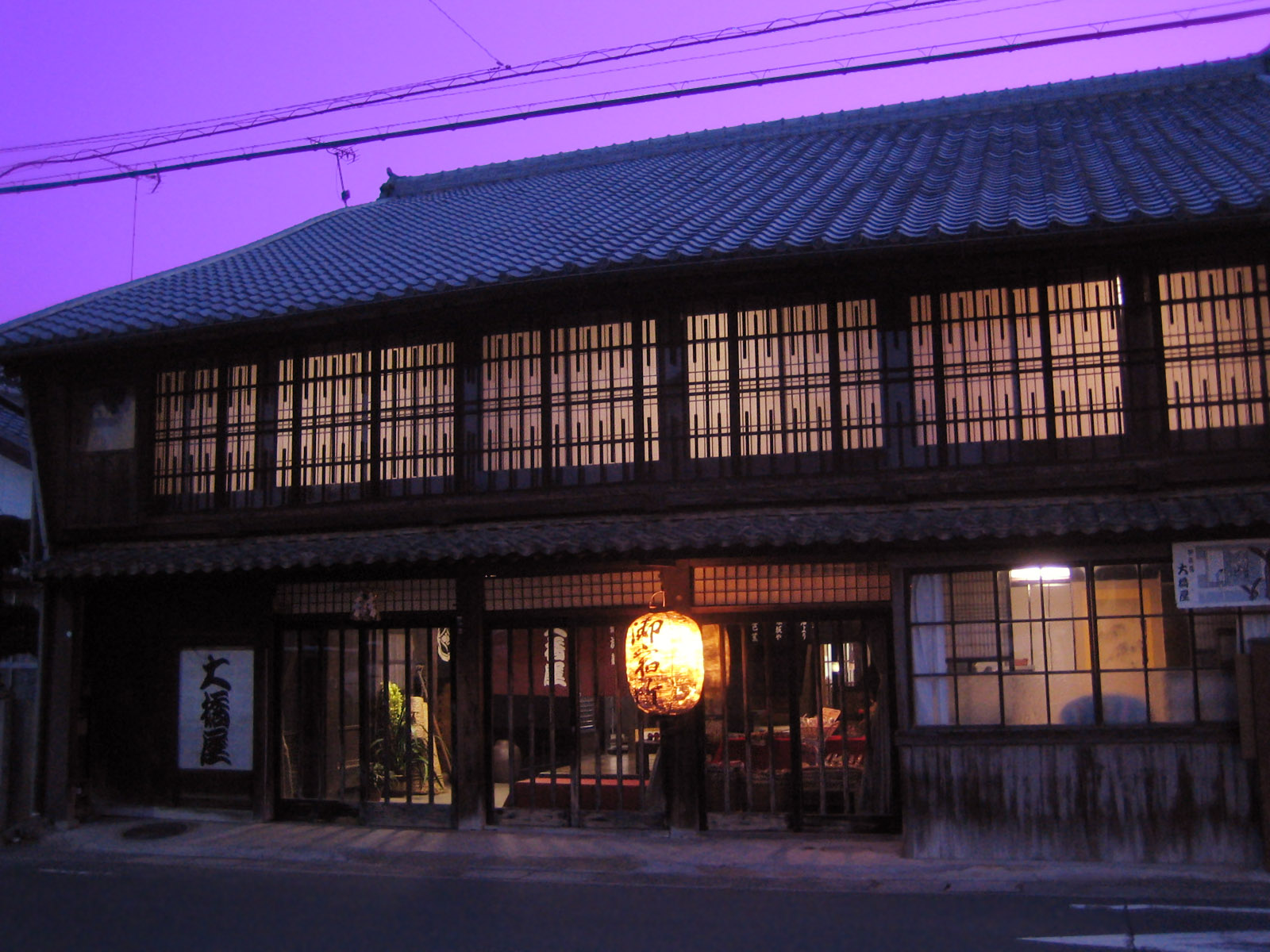
Ōhashi-ya

Ōhashi-ya (大橋屋), an inn that first opened in 1649, less than half a century after the creation of the Tōkaidō, still operates today. The building it uses was built in 1716. During a census in 1733, there were 83 inns in Akasaka-juku, but only Ōhashi-ya remains today. At its peak, though, there were 349 buildings, including three honjin, one sub-honjin and 62 hatago.

Goyu-shuku was less than 2 km from Akasaka-juku, making them the closest stations on the whole of the Tōkaidō. At Sekigawa Shrine (関川神社) in Otowa, Matsuo Bashō wrote the following haiku, because they were so close:

夏の月 御油より出でて 赤坂や
Natsu no tsuki / Goyu yori idete / Akasaka ya.
"By the summer moon, / depart out from Goyu and / reach Akasaka."

When the construction of the Tōkaidō Main Line bypassed the area, it missed out on many of the economic advantages that the railroad brought. Furthermore, even though the area gained connections to rail networks with the construction of the Meitetsu Nagoya Main Line, it was still unable to flourish because none of the express trains stopped at Meiden-Akasaka Station.

== Neighboring Post Towns ==
Tōkaidō
Goyu-shuku - Akasaka-juku - Fujikawa-shuku
