= Hoi District =

Former district in Aichi Prefecture, Japan

Map of Hoi District in Aichi Prefecture until 2010

Hoi (宝飯郡, Hoi-gun) was a district located in eastern Aichi Prefecture, Japan.

As of 2008 (the last data available), the district had an estimated population of 21,766 with a density of 2,194 persons per km^{2}. Its total area was 9.92 km^{2}.

== Municipalities ==
Prior to its dissolution, the district consisted of only one town:

- Kozakai (Note: Classified as a town.)

== History ==
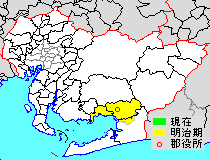
Map showing original extent of Hoi District in Aichi Prefecture: * yellow - areas formerly within the district borders during the early Meiji period

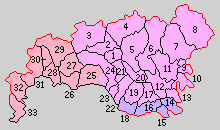
Colored areas are in this district.

Hoi District was one of the ancient districts of Mikawa Province, and is mentioned in Nara period records. Originally covering all of eastern Mikawa, Shitara District to the north was separated from Hoi in 903. The district contained the provincial capital of Mikawa along with the provincial temple, both of which were located in what is now part of the city of Toyokawa. During the Sengoku period, the area was controlled by various samurai clans, including the Makino and branches of the Honda and Matsudaira clans, all of whom rose to high positions within the Tokugawa shogunate. The area was also a battlefield between the forces of the Imagawa clan and the Oda and Tokugawa clans during the late Sengoku period.

=== District Timeline ===
In the cadastral reforms of the early Meiji period, on July 22, 1878, modern Hoi District was created, with its headquarters at Goyu-shuku, a former station on the Tōkaidō. With the organization of municipalities on October 1, 1889, Hoi District was divided into 33 villages.

The villages of Gamagōri and Uchikubo were elevated to town status on October 6, 1891. They were followed in rapid succession by the village of Shimoji (October 16, 1891), the village of Goyu (January 29, 1892), the village of Toyokawa (March 13, 1893), the villages of Akasaka and Kō (June 23, 1894), and the village of Miya (December 10, 1894). In a round of consolidation, the remaining number of villages was reduced from 25 to 11 in 1906. The district office was transferred to the town of Kō in 1923. The village of Katahara was raised to town status on April 1, 1924, the village of Kosakai on September 12, 1926, and the village of Mito on February 11, 1930. On September 1, 1932, the town of Shimoji was annexed by the neighboring city of Toyohashi. The city of Toyokawa was formed on June 1, 1943, by the merger of the towns of Toyokawa, Ushikubo and Kō, and the village of Yawata. The village of Nishiura was raised to town status on February 11, 1944.

On April 1, 1954, the city was Gamagōri was formed by the merger of the towns of Gamagōri and Miya, and the village of Shiotsu. In a further round of consolidations in 1955, the town of Otowa was formed on April 1, 1955, and the structure of the district became six towns and one village. On April 1, 1959, the town of Goyu was annexed by the city of Toyokawa. The village of Ichinomiya was raised to town status on April 1, 1961. The towns of Katahara and Nishiura were annexed by the city of Gamagōri on April 1, 1962, and April 1, 1963, respectively. In a final round of mergers, the town of Ichinomiya was annexed by the city of Toyokawa on February 1, 2006, followed by the towns of Otowa and Mito on January 15, 2008. When the town of Kozakai was merged into Toyokawa on February 1, 2010, Hoi ceased to exist as an administrative division.

=== Recent mergers ===
- On February 1, 2006 - The town of Ichinomiya (a.k.a. Mikawaichinomiya) was merged into the expanded city of Toyokawa.
- On January 15, 2008 - The towns of Otowa and Mito were merged into the expanded city of Toyokawa.
- On February 1, 2010 - The town of Kozakai was merged into the expanded city of Toyokawa. Therefore, Hoi District dissolved as a result of this merger.

== See also ==
- List of dissolved districts of Japan
