= Nishi-Ōhira Domain =

Coordinates: 34°56′26.5″N 137°11′46.4″E

Nishi-Ōhira Domain 西大平藩
- Domain of Japan
- 1748–1870
- Mon of the Ōoka clan
- Capital: Nishi-Ōhira jin'ya
  - Type: Daimyō
- Historical era: Edo period
  - Established: 1748
  - Disestablished: 1870
- Today part of: Aichi Prefecture

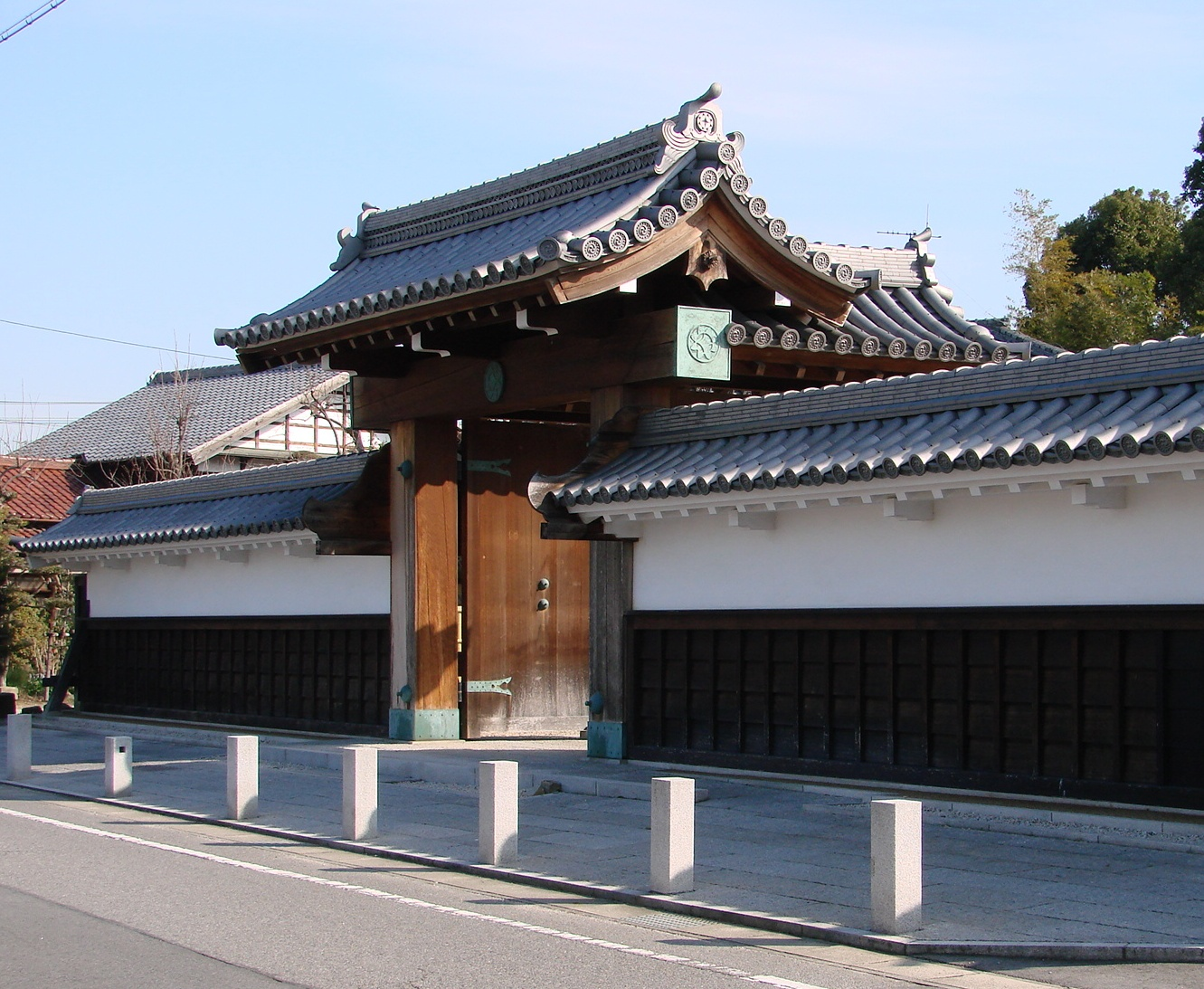
Gate of Nishi-Ōhira jin'ya

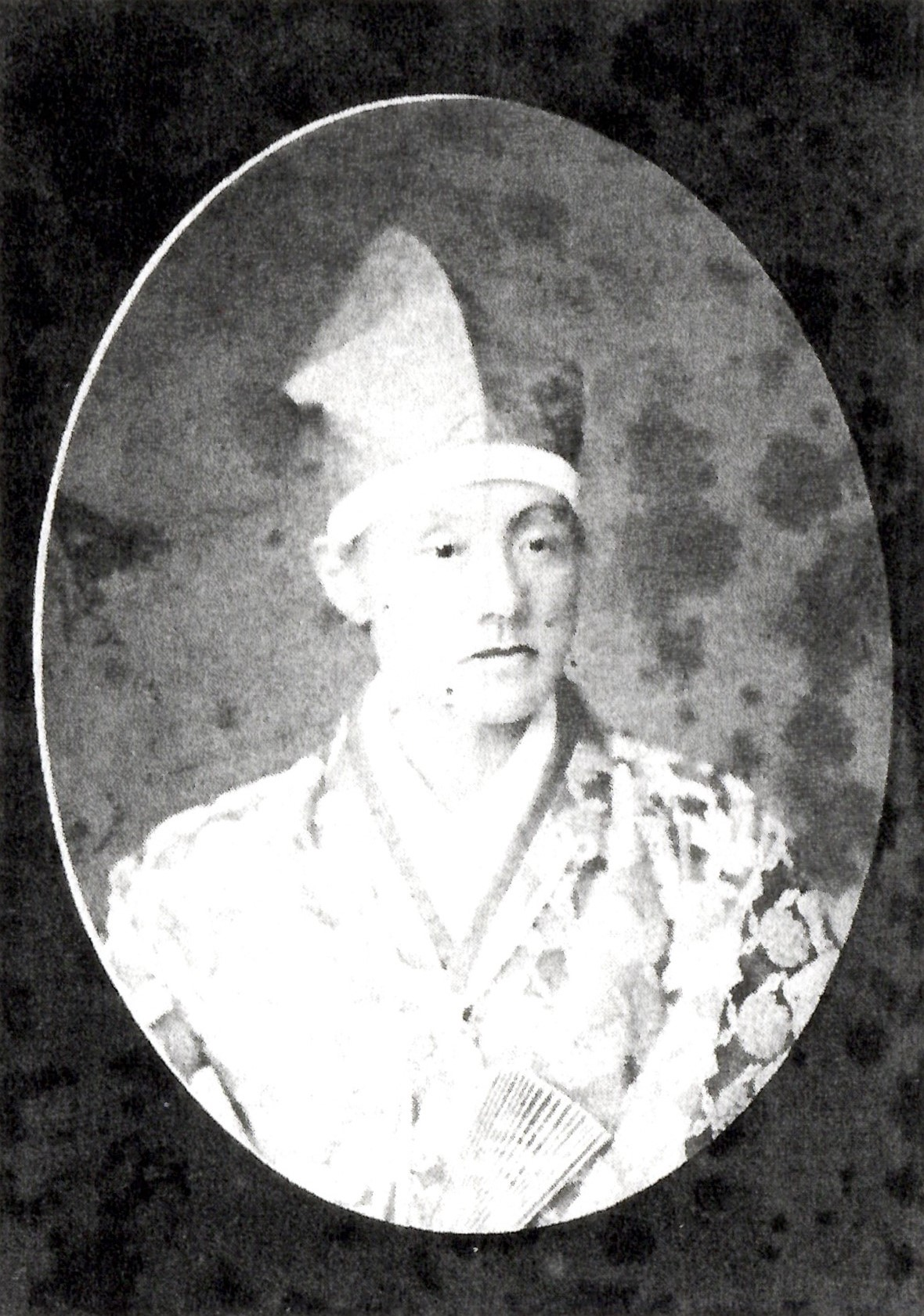
Oooka Tadataka, final daimyo of Nishi-Ōhira Domain

Nishi-Ōhira Domain (西大平藩, Nishi-Ōhira han) was a Japanese feudal domain of the Edo period Tokugawa shogunate, located in Nukata District Mikawa Province (part of modern-day Aichi Prefecture), Japan. It was centered on what is now part of the city of Okazaki, Aichi.

== History ==
Ōoka Tadasuke, the famous magistrate who had served the 9th Tokugawa shōgun, Tokugawa Yoshimune, and who had successfully carried out the Kyōhō Reforms received an additional 4,000 koku in revenue on his promotion to sōshaban in 1748. This put him over the 10,000 koku requirement to be styled as daimyō, and he received the newly created fief of Nishi-Ōhira as his domain. However, he never relocated to his new territory, and resided in Edo to his death in 1757.

Nishi-Ōhira Domain was not a single contiguous territory, but consisted of several widely scattered holdings: in addition to 12 villages in Nukata District, the territory consisted of 5 villages in Kamo District, 5 villages in Hoi District, 2 villages in Omi District in Mikawa, 3 villages in Ichihara District, Kazusa Province and the original 2 villages of the Ōoka clan in Kōza District, Sagami Province.

The domain was inherited by Ōoka Tadasuke's heirs after his death, but it was not until 1748, during the tenure of his grandson, Ōoka Tadatsune, that a jin'ya fortified residence was built in Nishi-Ōhira to be the nominal capital of the domain. Due to its special relationship with the Tokugawa shogunate, the Ōoka clan was one of the few clans exempted from the sankin kōtai regulations, and lived in their Edo residence full-time. The graves of all of the daimyō of Nishi-Ōhira are located at the Ōoka clan temple of Jōken-ji in Chigasaki, Kanagawa.

During the Bakumatsu period, Nishi-Ōhira remained loyal to the Tokugawa shogunate, but after the Battle of Toba–Fushimi in the Boshin War, capitulated to the new Meiji government. After the abolition of the han system in July 1871, it became “Nishi-Ōhira Prefecture”, which later became part of Aichi Prefecture.

The domain had a population of 6,945 people in 1709 households per an 1869 census. It maintained its Edo residence kamiyashiki in Sakuradamon.

== List of daimyōs ==
#	Name	Tenure	Courtesy title	Court Rank	kokudaka	Lineage
Ōoka clan, 1748 - 1871 (Fudai)
1	Ōoka Tadasuke (大岡忠相)	1748–1751	Echizen-no-kami (越前守)	Junior 5th Rank, Lower Grade (従五位下)	10,000 koku	4th son of hatamoto Ōoka Tadataka
2	Ōoka Tadayoshi (大岡忠宜)	1755–1766	Echizen-no-kami (越前守)	Junior 5th Rank, Lower Grade (従五位下)	10,000 koku	2nd son of Tadasuke
3	Ōoka Tadatsune (大岡忠恒)	1766–1784	Echizen-no-kami (越前守)	Junior 5th Rank, Lower Grade (従五位下)	10,000 koku	2nd son of Tadayoshi
4	Ōoka Tadatomo (大岡忠與)	1784–1786	Echizen-no-kami (越前守)	Junior 5th Rank, Lower Grade (従五位下)	13,000 koku	3rd son of Ogasawara Nagamichi
5	Ōoka Tadayori (大岡忠移)	1786–1828	Echizen-no-kami (越前守)	Junior 5th Rank, Lower Grade (従五位下)	10,000 koku	3rd son of Tadatsune
6	Ōoka Tadayoshi (2nd) (大岡忠愛)	1828–1857	Echizen-no-kami (越前守)	Junior 5th Rank, Lower Grade (従五位下)	10,000 koku	son of Tadayori
7	Ōoka Tadataka (大岡忠敬)	1857–1871	Echizen-no-kami (越前守)	Junior 5th Rank, Lower Grade (従五位下)	10,000 koku	5th son of Tadayori

== Holdings at the end of the Edo period ==
  - Mikawa Province
  - Hekkai District - 2 villages
  - Nukata District - 12 villages
  - Kamo District - 5 villages
  - Baoi County - 5 villages
  - Sagami Province
  - Koza District - 2 villages
  - Kazusa Province
  - Ichihara District - 3 villages

== Nishiōhira Domain ==
The Nishiōhira Domain (西大平藩) is a domain that is located in Nishihata Village, Hekikai County, Mikawa Province (Kosai-cho, Hekinan City, Aichi Prefecture). The head clan of the lord of the domain was the lord of Nishibata Village since the Edo period. The Honda clan, ruled Ina Castle in Hoi County, Mikawa Province during the Sengoku period. Honda Tadatsugu, who served Tokugawa Ieyasu as the lord of Ina Castle, adopted Honda Yasutoshi, the second son of Sakai Tadatsugu and the daughter of Matsudaira Kiyoyasu (Princess Usui), as his mother and succeeded him.

In the Siege of Osaka in 1615, Tadasuke went to the front with his father Yasutoshi the lord of the Nishio Domain with 20,000 koku. His father Yasutoshi was transferred to Zeze Domain in 1617.

In 1630, 1,500 koku was added and 1000 koku was added in Kozuko and Shimotsuke Province, and a total of 9,000 koku was acquired. In February 1869, Tadayuki reformed the domain administration organization and established the Legislative and Political Bureau, Accounting Bureau, Military Affairs Bureau, School Bureau.

On July 14, 1871, the Nishibata Domain was abolished due to the abolition of feudal domains and the establishment of prefectures, and the West End Prefecture was established. Due to the integration of prefectures at the end of the same year, the domain was abolished and incorporated into Nukata Prefecture and eventually was incorporated into Aichi Prefecture.

== Holdings at the end of the Edo Period ==
  - Mikawa Province
  - Hekikai County - 5 villages
  - Ueno Country
  - Nitta County - 6 villages
  - Oura County - 1 village
    - Shimotsuke Province
  - Aso County - 1 village
    - Kazusa Province
  - Shuhuai County - 4 villages
  - Busha County - 3 villages
    - Shimosa Province
  - Katori County - 2 villages
  - Sosa County - 3 villages
  - Musashi County
  - Tama County - 6 villages
    - Izu Province
  - Tagata County - 4 villages
  - Kamo County - 2 villages

== List of daimyo ==
#	Name	Tenure	Courtesy title	Court Rank	kokudaka
Honda clan, 1616 - 1871 (Hatamoto)
1	Honda Tadasuke (本多忠相)	1616 - 1672	Mimasaka no kami (美作 の 髪)	Junior 5th Rank, Lower Grade (従五位下)	8,000 koku
2	Honda Tadamasa (本多忠将)	1672 - 1692	Tsushima no kami, Bizen no kami (津島 の 髪、 日前 の 髪)	Junior 5th Rank, Lower Grade (従五位下)	8,000 koku
3	Honda Tadayoshi (本多忠能)	1692 - ????	Inaba no kami (いなば の 髪)	Junior 5th Rank, Lower Grade (従五位下)	8,000 koku
4	Honda Tadataka (本多忠敞)	???? - ????	Harima no kami (播磨 の 髪)	Junior 5th Rank, Lower Grade (従五位下)	8,000 koku
5	Honda Tadanaga (本多忠栄)	???? - ????	Tsushima no kami (津島 の 髪)	Junior 5th Rank, Lower Grade (従五位下)	8,000 koku
6	Honda Tadanao (本多忠盈)	???? - ????	Unknown (未知の)	Junior 5th Rank, Lower Grade (従五位下)	8,000 koku
7	Honda Tadamitsu (本多忠盈)	???? - ????	Unknown (未知の)	Junior 5th Rank, Lower Grade (従五位下)	8,000 koku
8	Honda Tadakazu (本多忠和)	???? - ????	Unknown (未知の)	Junior 5th Rank, Lower Grade (従五位下)	8,000 koku
9	Honda Tadaoki (本多忠興)	???? - ????	Tsushima no kami (津島 の 髪)	Junior 5th Rank, Lower Grade (従五位下)	8,000 koku
10	Honda Tadahiro (本多忠寛)	1864 - 1867	Mimasaka no kami (美作 の 髪)	Junior 5th Rank, Lower Grade (従五位下)	8,000 koku
11	Honda Tadayuki (本多忠鵬)	1867 - 1871	Tsushima no kami (津島 の 髪)	Junior 5th Rank, Lower Grade (従五位下)	8,000 koku

== See also ==
- List of han
- Abolition of the han system
