= Muko River =

River in Japan

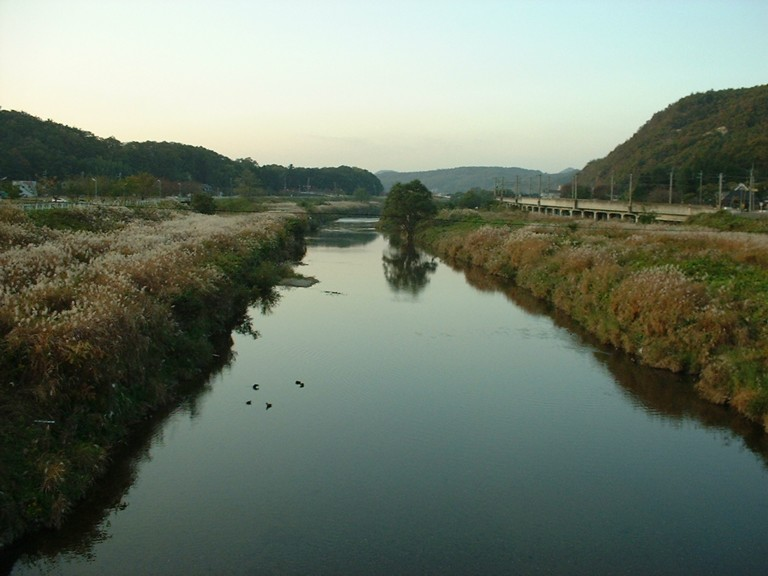

- Location within Japan

Location
- Country: Japan

Physical characteristics
- Length: 66 km (41 mi)

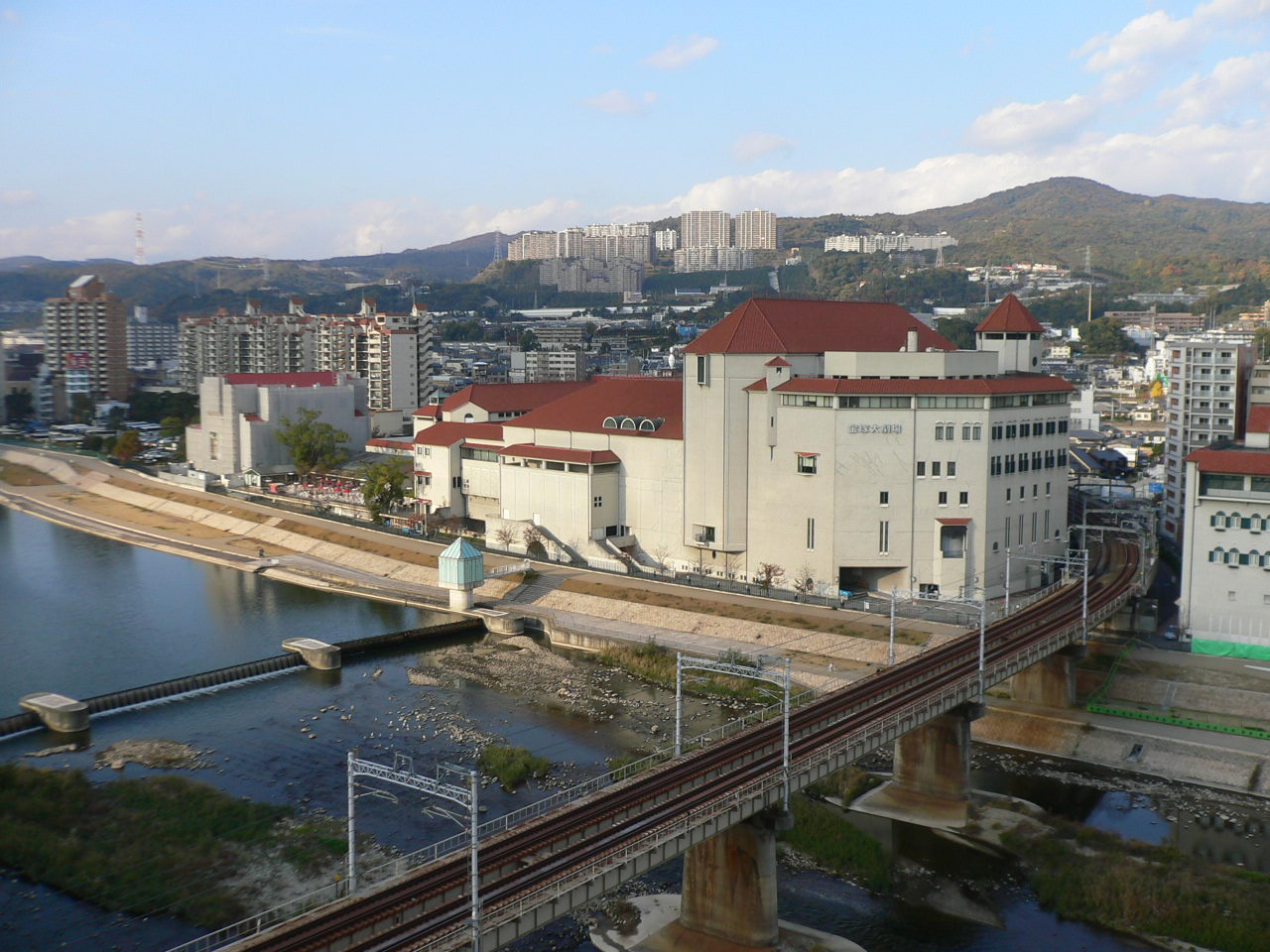
The Mukogawa and Takarazuka Grand Theater at Takarazuka City

The Muko River (武庫川, Mukogawa) is a river in the south-eastern part of Hyōgo Prefecture. This river was selected as the second most important river in the region by the prefecture governor. Its total length is 66 kilometres (41 mi), and the drainage area is 496 square kilometres (192 sq mi).

== Description ==
The Muko River originates at Mount Shirakami (白髪山, Shirakami-yama) in the Tanba Highland. It flows through the Sanda Basin, and creates the Mukogawa Keikoku Ravine between Sanda and Takarazuka. It continues into Osaka Plain at Takarazuka, and flows in the Osaka Metropolitan Area to create the borders between Takarazuka and Itami as well as between Nishinomiya and Amagasaki. This river flows into Osaka Bay, and was used to transport the Kohama style of sake from the Kohama-juku (小浜宿) in Amagasaki Domain of Settsu Province during the Edo period.

== Major tributaries ==
- Aonogawa River in Sasayama
- Arimagawa River in Kobe and Nishinomiya
- Arinogawa River in Kobe
- Hatsukagawa River in Nose, Sanda, Takarazuka and Kobe
- Sakasegawa River in Takarazuka
- Nigawa River in Takarazuka
- Edagawa River in Nishinomiya
