= Honda Yasutoshi =

Honda Yasutoshi may refer to:

- Honda Yasutoshi (1569–1621), daimyō of Zeze Domain 1617 - 1621
- Honda Yasutoshi (1693–1747), daimyō of Zeze Domain 1719 - 1747

== See also ==
- Honda clan
