= Amagasaki Castle =

Castle in Hyōgo Prefecture, Japan

- 尼崎城
- Amagasaki, Hyōgo Prefecture, Japan
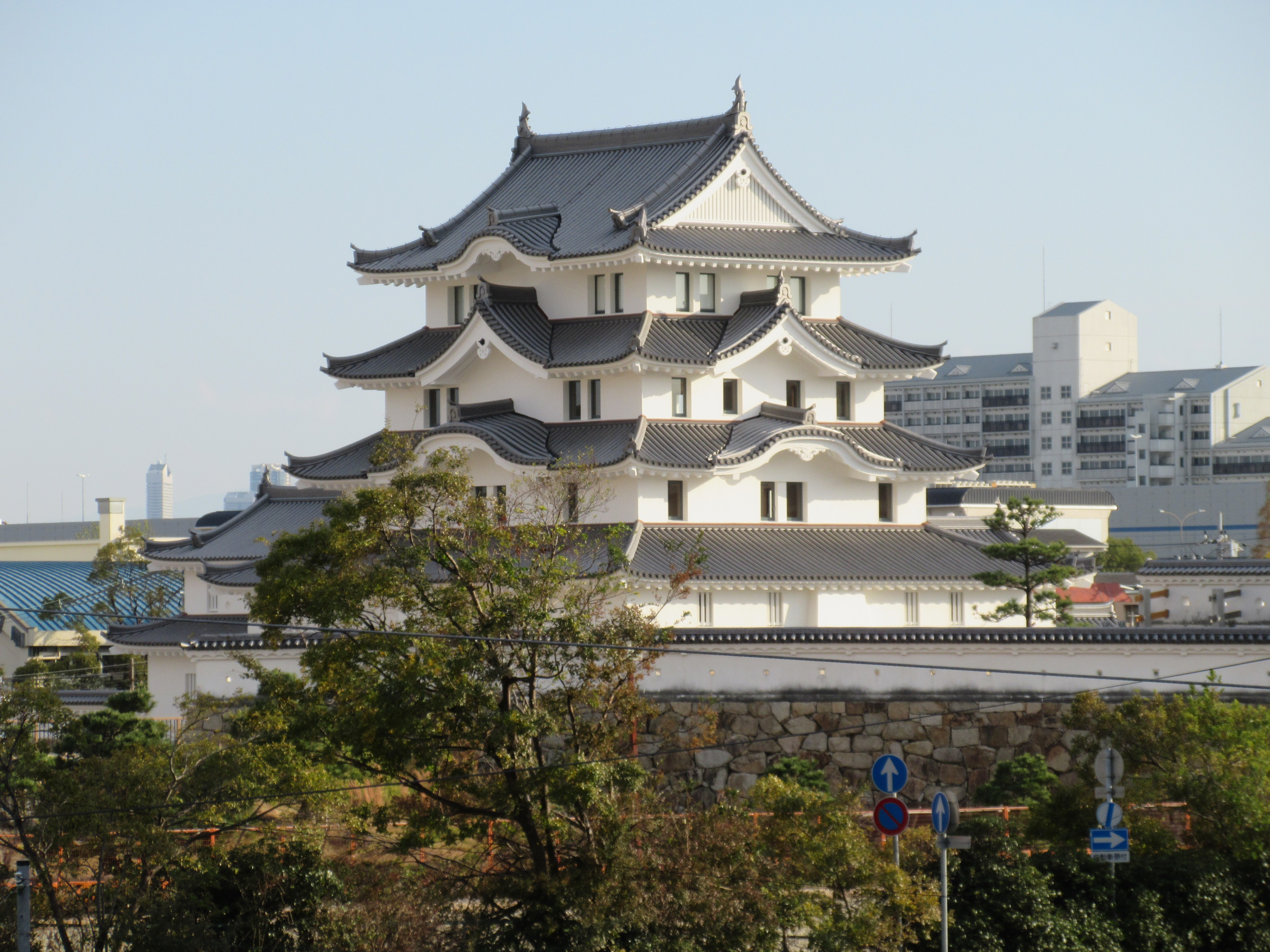
- Reconstructed tenshu (keep) of Amagasaki Castle

Site information
- Type: flatland-style Japanese castle)
- Condition: reconstructed tenshu

Location
- Amagasaki Castle
- Location within Hyōgo Prefecture Location within Japan
- Coordinates: 34°42′51.757″N 135°25′14.005″E

Site history
- Built: 1617
- Built by: Toda Ujikane
- Demolished: 1873

Amagasaki Castle (尼崎城; Amagasaki-jō) was a flatland type Japanese castle located in the city of Amagasaki, Hyōgo Prefecture, Japan. The castle was the headquarters of Amagasaki Domain, which ruled this portion of northern Settsu Province under the Tokugawa shogunate of Edo Period Japan. The castle was destroyed in the early Meiji period, but a portion was reconstructed in 2018.

== History ==
In October of 1578, Araki Murashige rebelled against Oda Nobunaga. In August of 1579 while surrounded by Nobunaga's military forces during the Siege of Itami (1579), Murashige fled to Amagasaki Castle. In November 1579, after Nobunaga secured control of Itami castle, "Araki Kyūzaemon and other leading figures, leaving their wives and children behind as hostages in Itami Castle, headed for Amagasaki to remonstrate with Araki Murashige and persuade him to hand over Amagasaki and Hanakuma." Araki Murashige refused to surrender Amagasaki and Hanakuma Castles. As a result, Nobunaga ordered the execution of 670 political hostages, the majority of whom were women and children.

Toda Ujikane built the present Amagasaki Castle in 1617 when he became daimyō of the 50,000 koku Amagasaki Domain. There was an earlier, smaller castle, originally built by the Hosokawa clan, in the Sengoku period on site. Amagasaki Castle was built around it. The site was strategic, located the delta area where the Omotsu River (currently reclaimed land) and the Shoge River flow into Osaka Bay. As completed, ships were able to dock directly at Amagasaki Castle. The castle had a triple concentric moat, and the central enclosure had a four-story tenshu with two two-story yagura turrets, and additional three-story yagura turrets at each corner of the enclosure. This Honmaru enclosure was almost square, measuring 115 meters in both east-west and north-south directions. In 1846, the Honmaru Palace (the residence of the daimyō) burned down, but was reconstructed the following year.

Following the Meiji restoration, all of the buildings in the castle were auctioned, and most were purchased by merchants in Osaka, dismantled and carted off. The subsequent fate of most of these structures is unknown. A portion of the daimyō residence survived in the main hall of the Shinsho-in, a Buddhist temple in Amagasaki, but was destroyed in World War II. At present, the site of the Honmaru enclosure is occupied by Amagasaki Municipal Meijo Elementary School, and most of the other enclosures and reclaimed inner and outer moats are occupied by city-related facilities and residential land. Only the northern half of the area was maintained as the Amagasaki Castle Ruins Park; however, the stone wall remnants in this park are all faux reproductions. The Amagasaki City Board of Education has conducted archaeological excavations on the site more than 20 times, and artifacts discovered are preserved at the Amagasaki City Museum of History.

== Current site ==
In 2015, a local entrepreneur offered to fund the reconstruction of a tenshu based on drawings and archaeological research, and additional funds were raised by public donation. Construction began in April 2018 and was completed in March 2019. In mid-2018 all of the exterior, including the ornate third-story roof, were complete. However, the site in Amagasaki Castle Ruins Park is where the original Nishi San-no-maru enclosure was located, and is about 300 meters northwest of the site of the original tenshu.

== Gallery ==
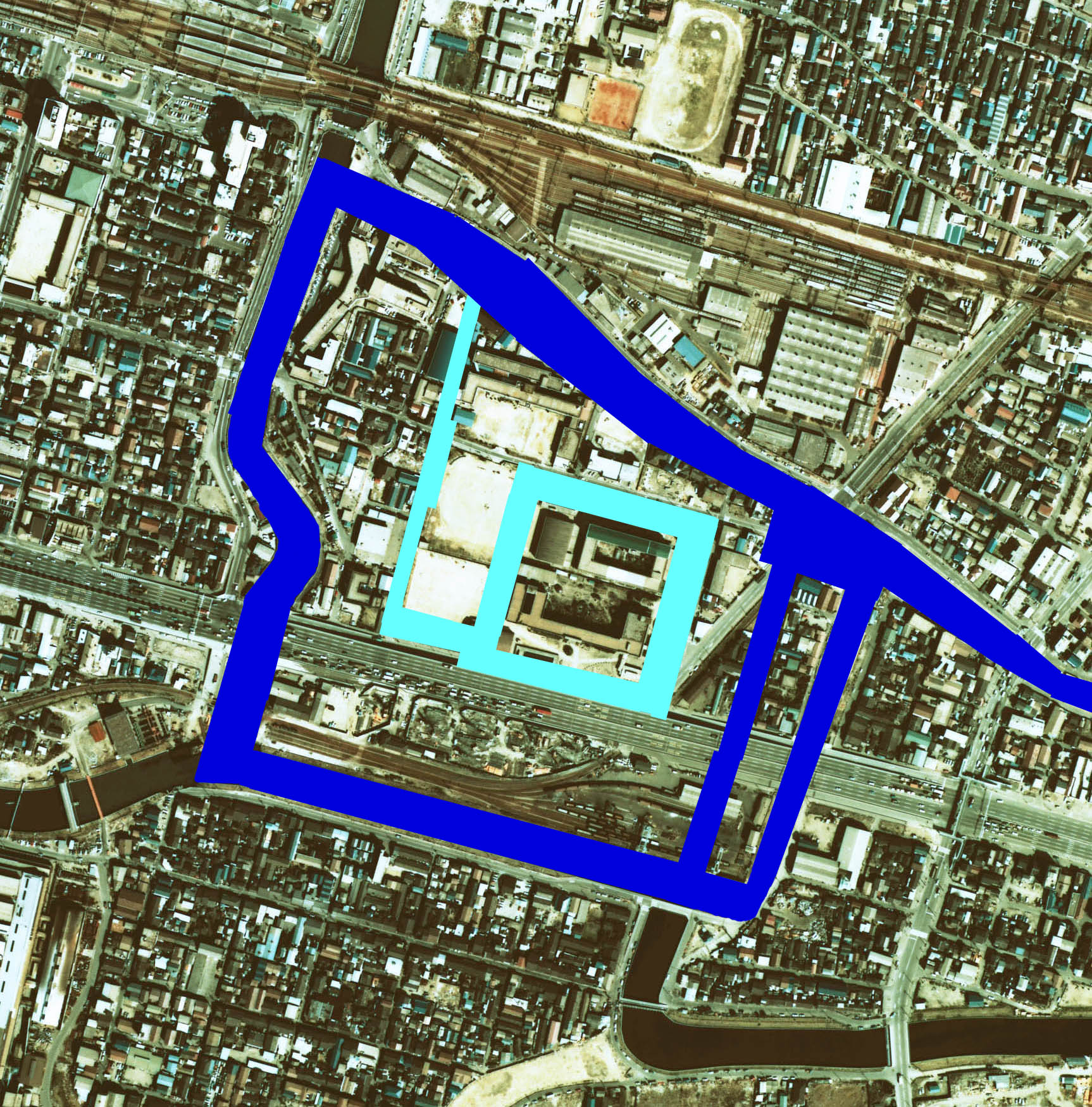
Layout

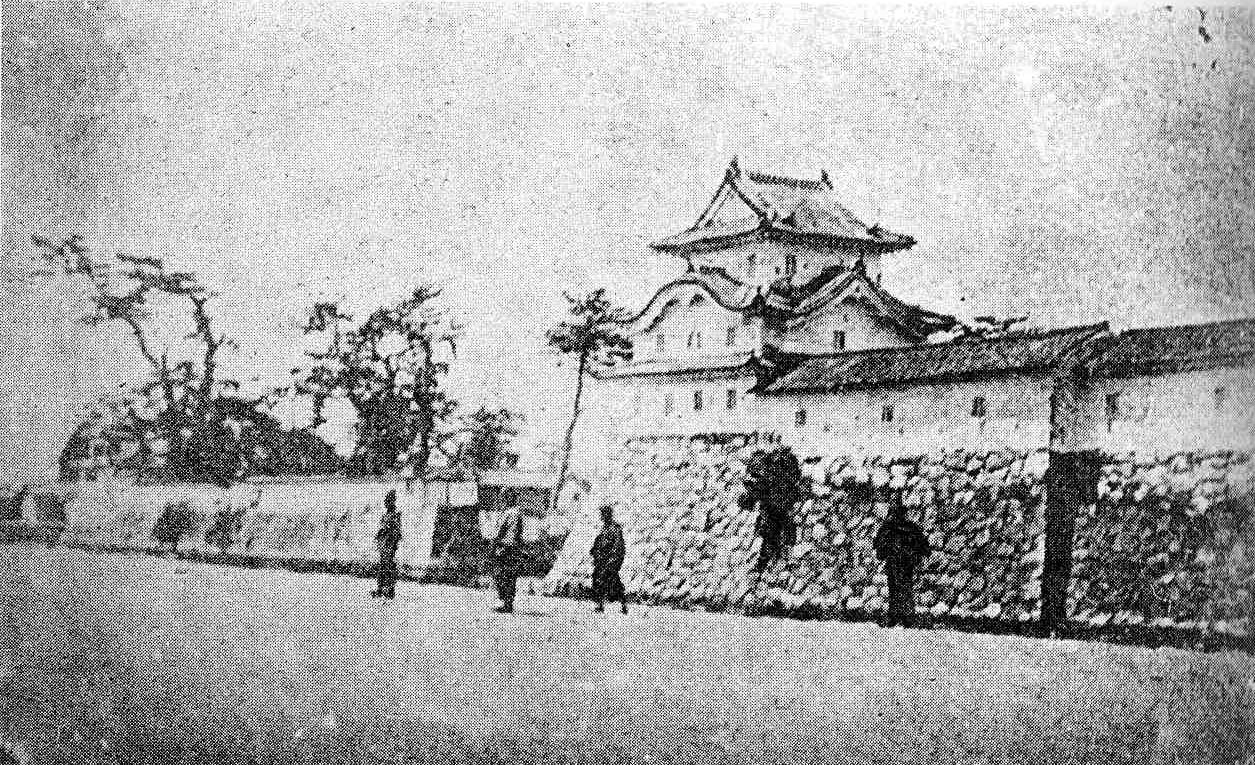
Amagasaki Castle pre-1871

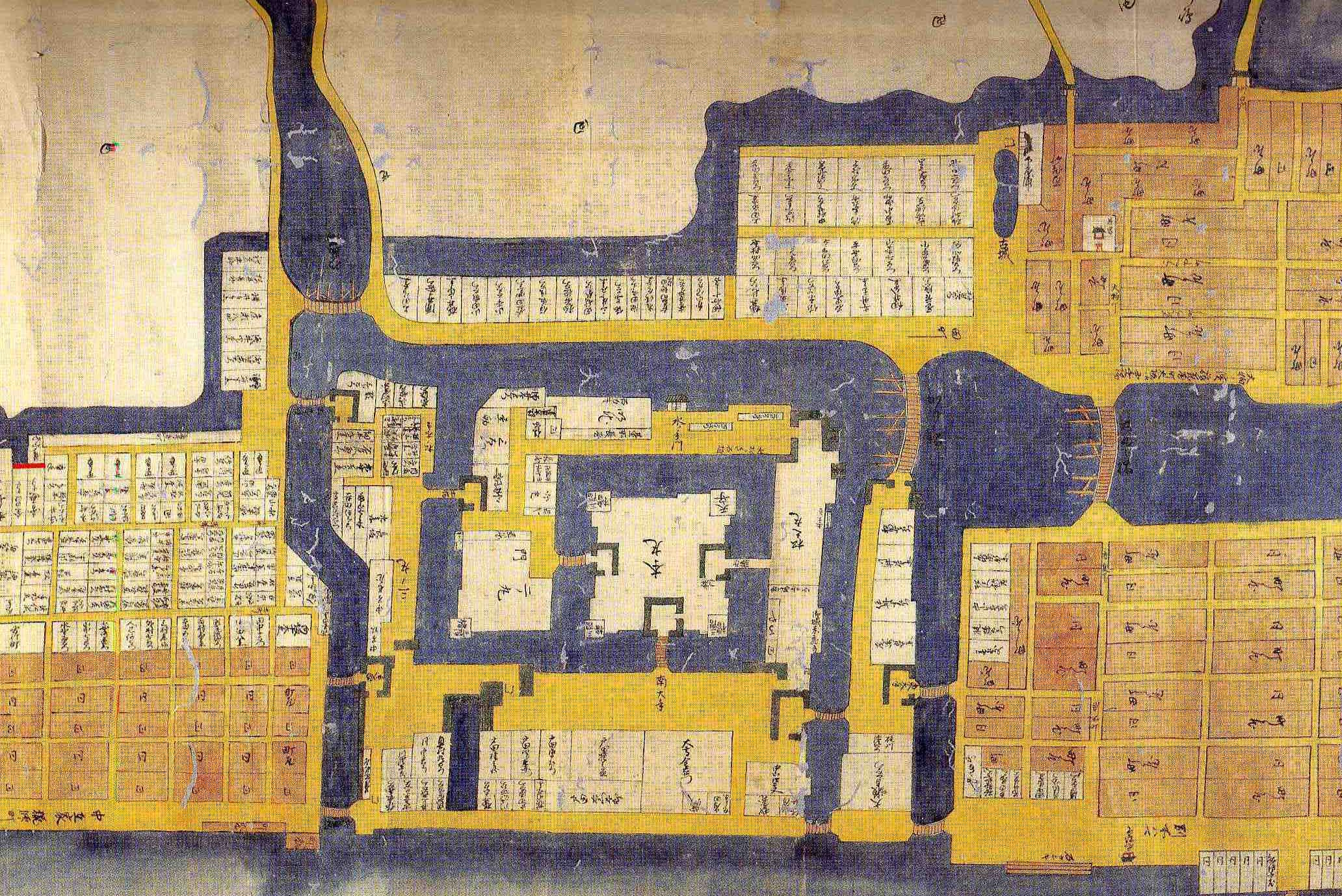
Map, dated 1635
