= Shindō temple ruins =

Hakuhō period Buddhist temple ruins

- 新堂廃寺跡 (Japanese)
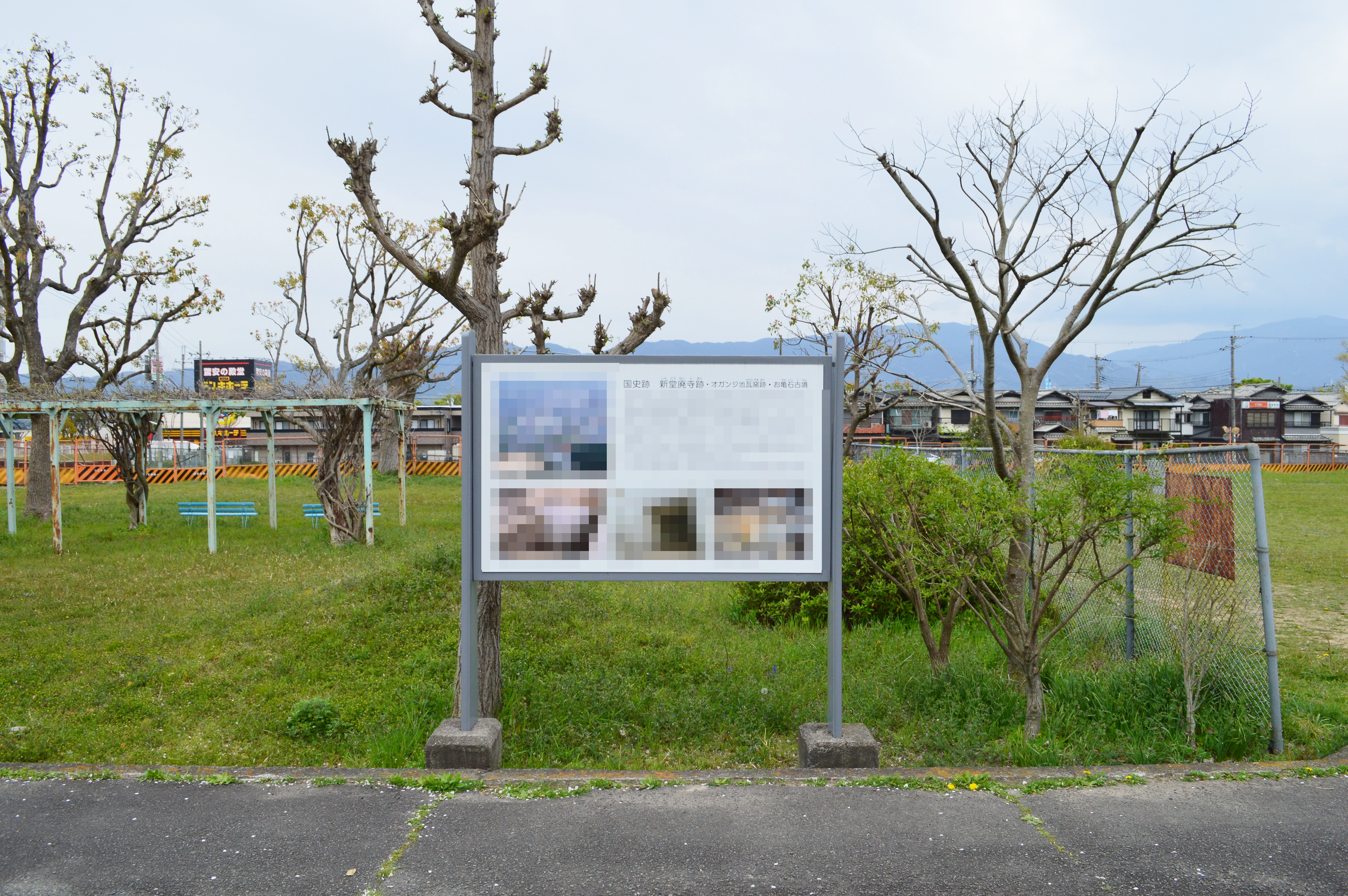
- Shindō temple ruins

- Shindō temple ruins Shindō temple ruins (Japan)
- Interactive map of Shindō temple ruins
- 34°30′37.23″N 135°36′2.05″E
- Type: temple ruins
- Periods: Hakuhō period
- Location: Tondabayashi, Osaka, Japan
- Region: Kansai region

Site notes
- Public access: Yes

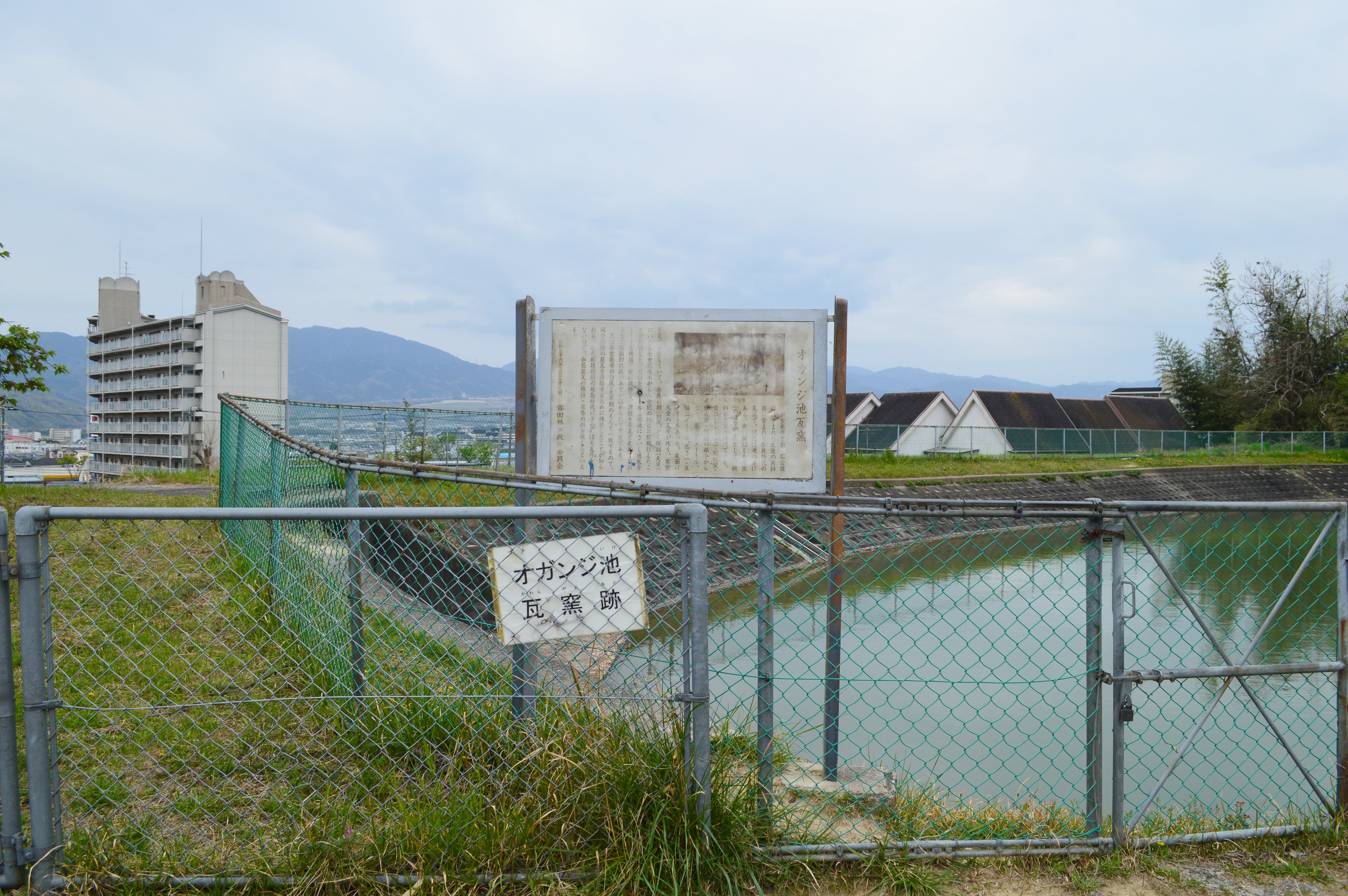
Oganji-ike tile kiln ruins

The Shindō temple ruins with Oganji-ike tile kiln ruins (新堂廃寺跡附オガンジ池瓦窯跡, Shindō Haiji ato tsuketari Oganji-ike kawara kama ato), is an archaeological site with the ruins of a Hakuhō period Buddhist temple and roof tile kiln remnants located in the Midorigaoka-cho and Nakano-cho neighborhoods of the city of Tondabayashi, Osaka, Japan. The temple and kilns no longer exists, but the loctations were collectively designated as a National Historic Site in 2002 together with the Okameishi Kofun.

== Overview ==
The Shindō temple ruins are located on a river terrace formed by Ishikawa, a tributary of the Yamato River at the foot of the Habikino hill in the southern part of the Osaka Plain. It has been known since the early twentieth century as a ruined temple site, as old roof tiles were scattered on ground, but it was not excavated until 1959. At that time, the foundation of four buildings rebuilt during the Hakuhō period were confirmed, and the foundations of a pagoda to the south. The layout of structures was patterned after Shitennō-ji in Osaka, with the Middle Gate, Pagoda, Main Hall and Lecture Hall all lined up in a row from south-to-north, with the cloiser connecting from the sides of the Middle Gate to the sides of the Lecture Hall, forming a courtyard which encloses the Pagoda and Main Hall. During the Tenpyō era (729-749), the temple was expanded, adding a South Gate, and additional East and West buildings connected to the cloister. The temple does not appear in historical documentation, so its true and history are unknown.

The Oganji-ike Tile Kiln Ruins is a semi-underground stepless climbing kiln located on the northeastern bank of Oganji Pond, about 500 meters northwest of the ruins of the Shindō Temple ruins.

The temple site is about a 20-minute walk from Tondabayashi Station on the Kintetsu Railway Kintetsu Nagano Line.

== See also ==
- List of Historic Sites of Japan (Osaka)
