= Kohama style =

The Kohama style (小浜流, Kohama-ryū) was a method of making sake during the Edo period at the Kohama-juku (小浜宿) in the Amagasaki Domain of the former Settsu Province of Japan (now Takarazuka, Hyōgo Prefecture). Today, the method is used by homebrew enthusiasts or by small boutique brewers.

== History ==
The Kohama style is a direct descendant of techniques used by temple priests near the Mukogawa River in southeastern Hyōgo Prefecture, who learned their distillation techniques from the Nara style. This style spread quickly through the area by Sessen Jūnigō (摂泉十二郷) to places such as Itami, Ikeda, and Kōike. The sake was produced, then shipped down the Mukogawa River to Osaka, where it was then shipped to Edo. However, Sessen fell out of favor with the shogunate, which then began to regulate the brewing of the Kohama sake, and the style eventually disappeared by the middle of the Edo period.

== Formula ==
The recipe for making Kohama style sake was discovered in old documents from the period, and it was found to similar to a more dry type of the Itami style of sake, while having its own bouquet. The mold used to make the sake helps to precipitate the proteins out of the sake brew, thereby helping it to clarify into the final product. The full details are found in the Dōmōshuzōki (童蒙酒造記), a record from the Edo Period.
