= Honda Yasushige =

Honda Yasushige may refer to:

- Honda Yasushige (1554-1611), daimyō of Okazaki Domain
- Honda Yasushige (Zeze) (1836–1912), daimyō of Zeze Domain

== See also ==
- Honda clan
