= Zeze Castle =

- 膳所城
- Ōtsu, Shiga Prefecture, Japan
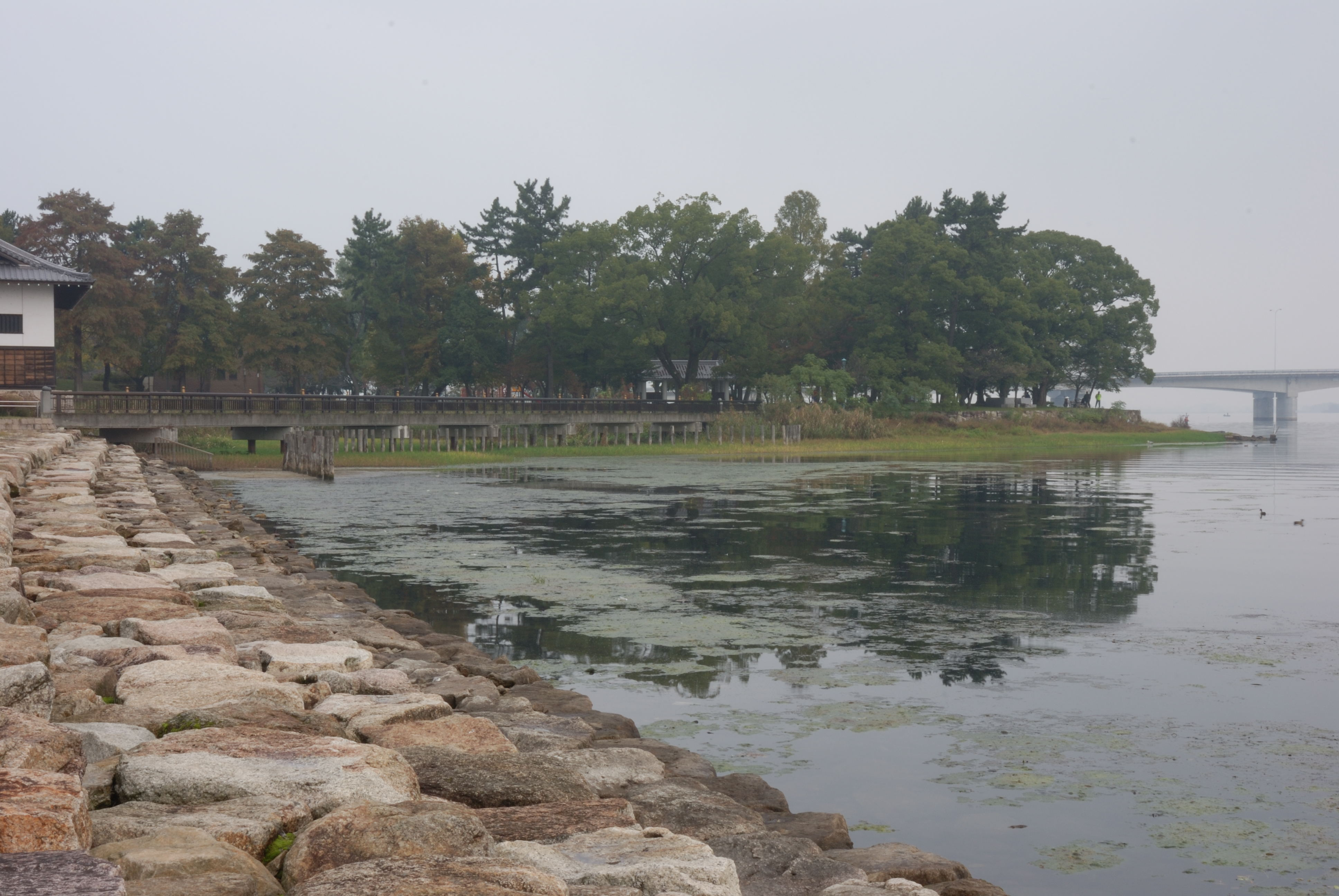
- Site of the Honmaru of Zeze Castle

Site information
- Type: hirashiro-style Japanese castle
- Open to the public: yes
- Condition: ruins

Location
- Coordinates: 34°59′42.98″N 135°53′43.29″E

Site history
- Built: 1601
- Built by: Tokugawa Ieyasu
- In use: Edo period
- Demolished: 1870

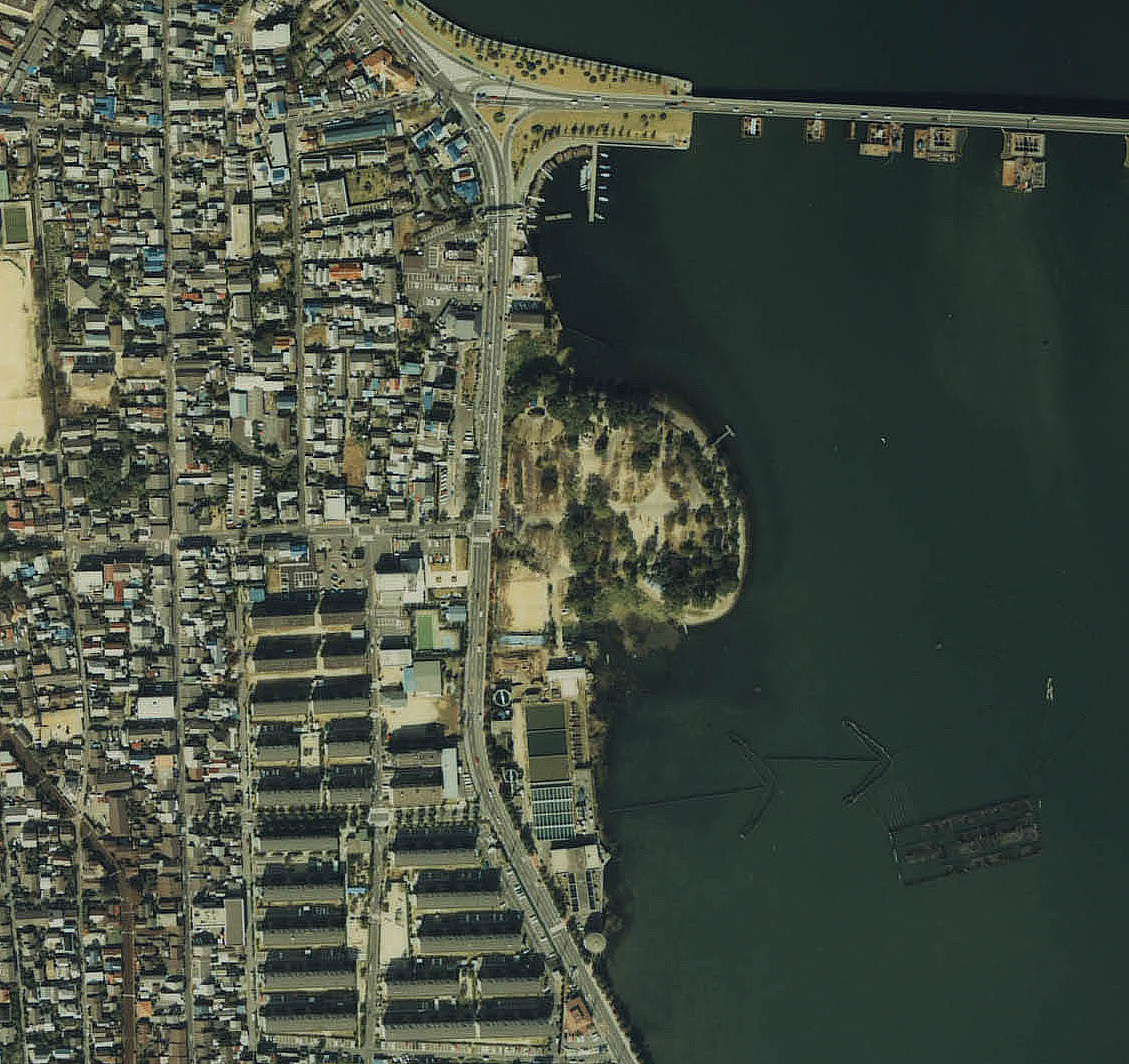
aerial photograph of site of Zeze Castle

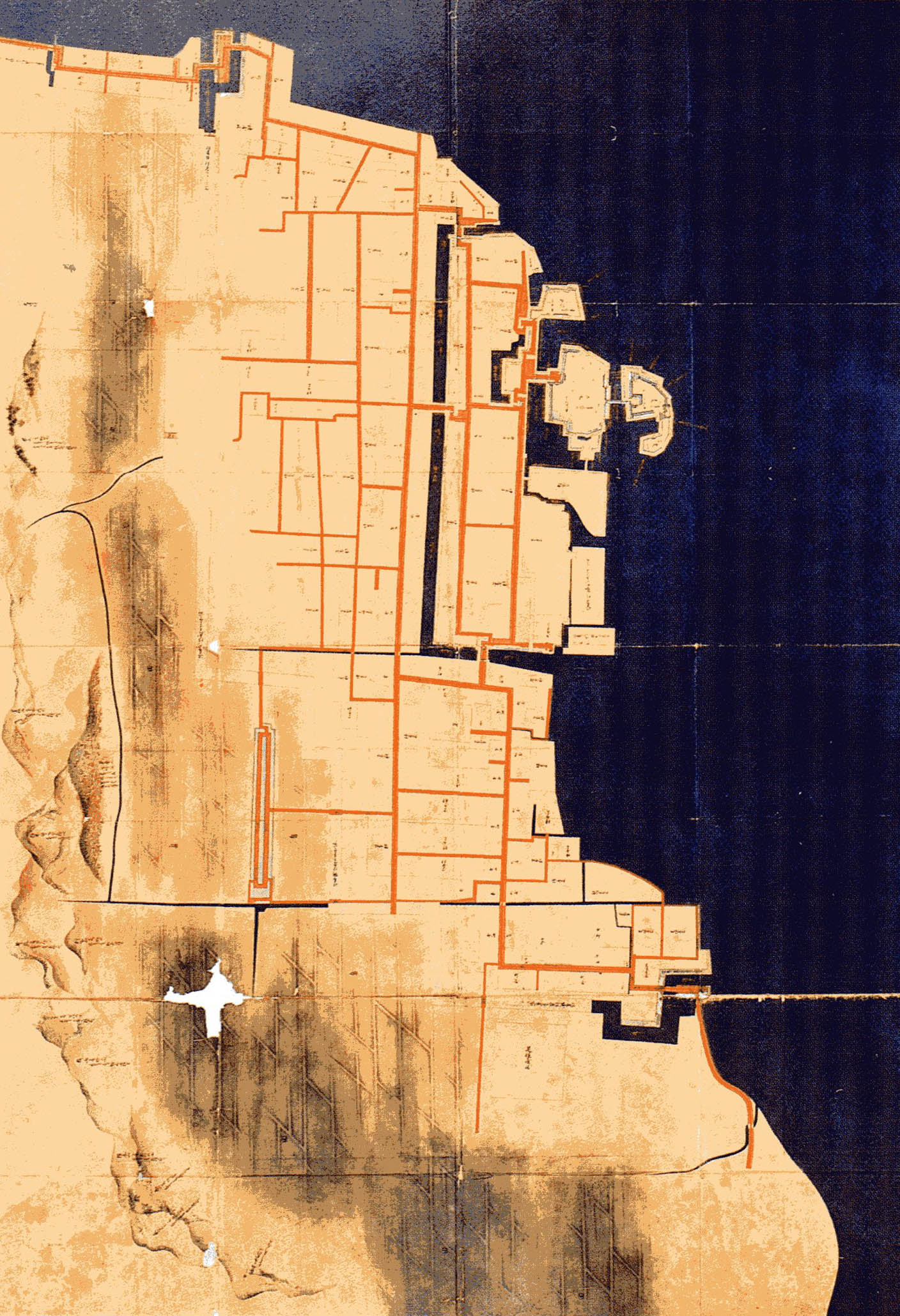
Edo period layout of Zeze Castle

Zeze Castle (膳所城, Zeze-jō), is a hirashiro-style Japanese castle located in eastern part of the city of Ōtsu, Shiga Prefecture, Japan.

== Overview ==
Zeze Castle is located on a peninsula jutting into Lake Biwa. Almost immediately after the Battle of Sekigahara, Tokugawa Ieyasu order the destruction of Ōtsu Castle and the construction of a new castle at this location in order to control the Tōkaidō highway connecting Kyoto with Edo and the provinces of eastern Japan. This was the most important highway in Edo Period Japan, and the location of Zeze Castle was even more strategically important as it was close to the Seta-no-Karahashi, an ancient bridge which marked the entrance to the capital. The layout of the castle was planned by Todo Takatora, who already had a reputation for castle design. The construction work was assigned to the major western daimyō, with many materials from the demolished Ōtsu Castle used to speed construction. The tenshu, located in the western corner of the inner bailey was unusual in that it had a four-story design. The San-no-maru (Third Bailey) was on the shore, with the Ni-no-maru (Second Bailey) and Honmaru (Inner Baily) separated by stone walls and moats, each forming an island.

On its completion, the castle was assigned to Toda Kazuaki, who was appointed daimyō of the newly created Zeze Domain with a kokudaka of 30,000 koku. His son, Toda Ujizane, was reassigned to Amagasaki Domain in Settsu Province in 1617, and the castle came under the control of a number of fudai daimyō clans, most notably the Honda clan, who ruled over 13 generations from 1651 to the Meiji restoration.

The castle was severely damaged by an earthquake in 1662, and due to its lakeside location suffered from land erosion which required constant upkeep. In 1870, after the Meiji restoration, the structures of the castle were either destroyed or sold off. The site of the inner bailey has become the "Zeze Castle Ruins Park", with a few stone walls remaining a reconstructed gate. A number of the original castle gates have survived in various locations, including at the Zeze Shrine (Ōtemon Gate from the Honmaru), Shinozu Shrine (North Ōtemon Gate), and Muchisaki Hachiman-gu (South Ōtemon Gate). Each of these three gates has been designated as a National Important Cultural Property. Another gate, the Koraimon Gate, has been relocated to the Hosomi Memorial Foundation in Izumiōtsu, Osaka. One of the two-story corner yagura towers survives at Chausuyama Park in Ōtsu, where it has been converted into a building for use for assemblies, but it no longer retains its original form. The site of the Ni-no-maru Bailey of the castle is now a water treatment plant.

The castle is a twenty-minute walk from Zeze Station on the JR West Biwako Line.

== See also ==
- Zeze Domain

== Literature ==
- De Lange, William (2021). An Encyclopedia of Japanese Castles. Groningen: Toyo Press. pp. 600 pages. ISBN 978-9492722300.
- Schmorleitz, Morton S. (1974). Castles in Japan. Tokyo: Charles E. Tuttle Co. pp. 144–145. ISBN 0-8048-1102-4.
- Motoo, Hinago (1986). Japanese Castles. Tokyo: Kodansha. p. 200 pages. ISBN 0-87011-766-1.
- Mitchelhill, Jennifer (2004). Castles of the Samurai: Power and Beauty. Tokyo: Kodansha. p. 112 pages. ISBN 4-7700-2954-3.
- Turnbull, Stephen (2003). Japanese Castles 1540-1640. Osprey Publishing. p. 64 pages. ISBN 1-84176-429-9.
