= Toda Ujikane =

Japanese daimyō

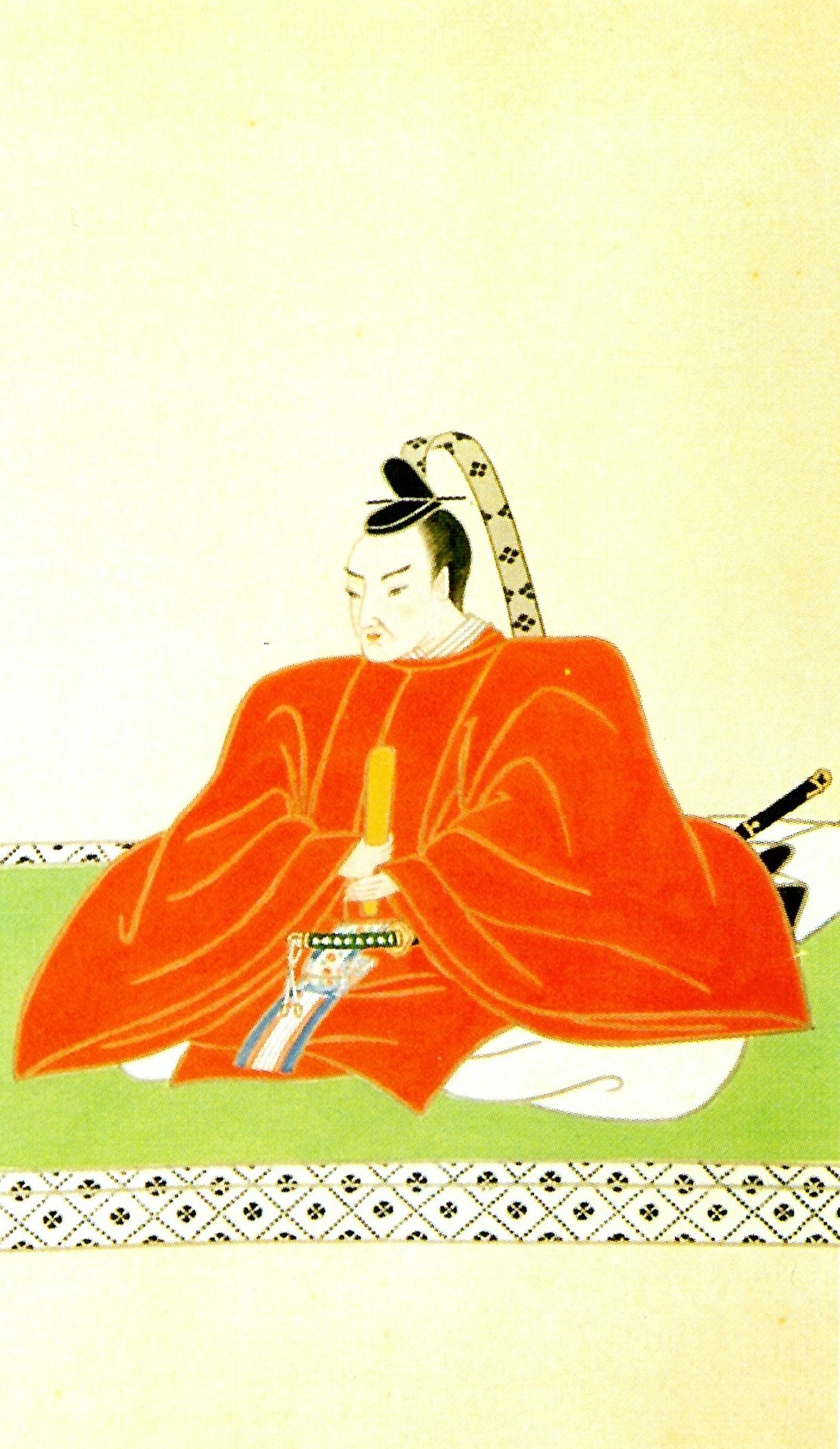
Portrait of Toda Ujikane

Toda Ujikane (戸田 氏鉄; 1576 – March 21, 1655) was a Japanese daimyō.

In 1617, he helped build the Amagasaki Castle.

Preceded by Toda Kazuaki	2nd (Toda) Daimyō of Zeze; 1604–1616	Succeeded by Honda Yasutoshi
Preceded by Takebe Masanaga	1st (Toda) Daimyō of Amagasaki; 1617–1635	Succeeded by Aoyama Yoshinari
Preceded by Matsudaira Sadatsuna	1st (Toda) Daimyō of Ogaki; 1635–1651	Succeeded by Toda Ujinobu
