= Ina Castle =

Coordinates: 34°47′38″N 137°20′05″E

Ina Castle (伊奈城, Inajō) is a castle located in the Kozakai area of Toyokawa city in Aichi Prefecture, Japan.

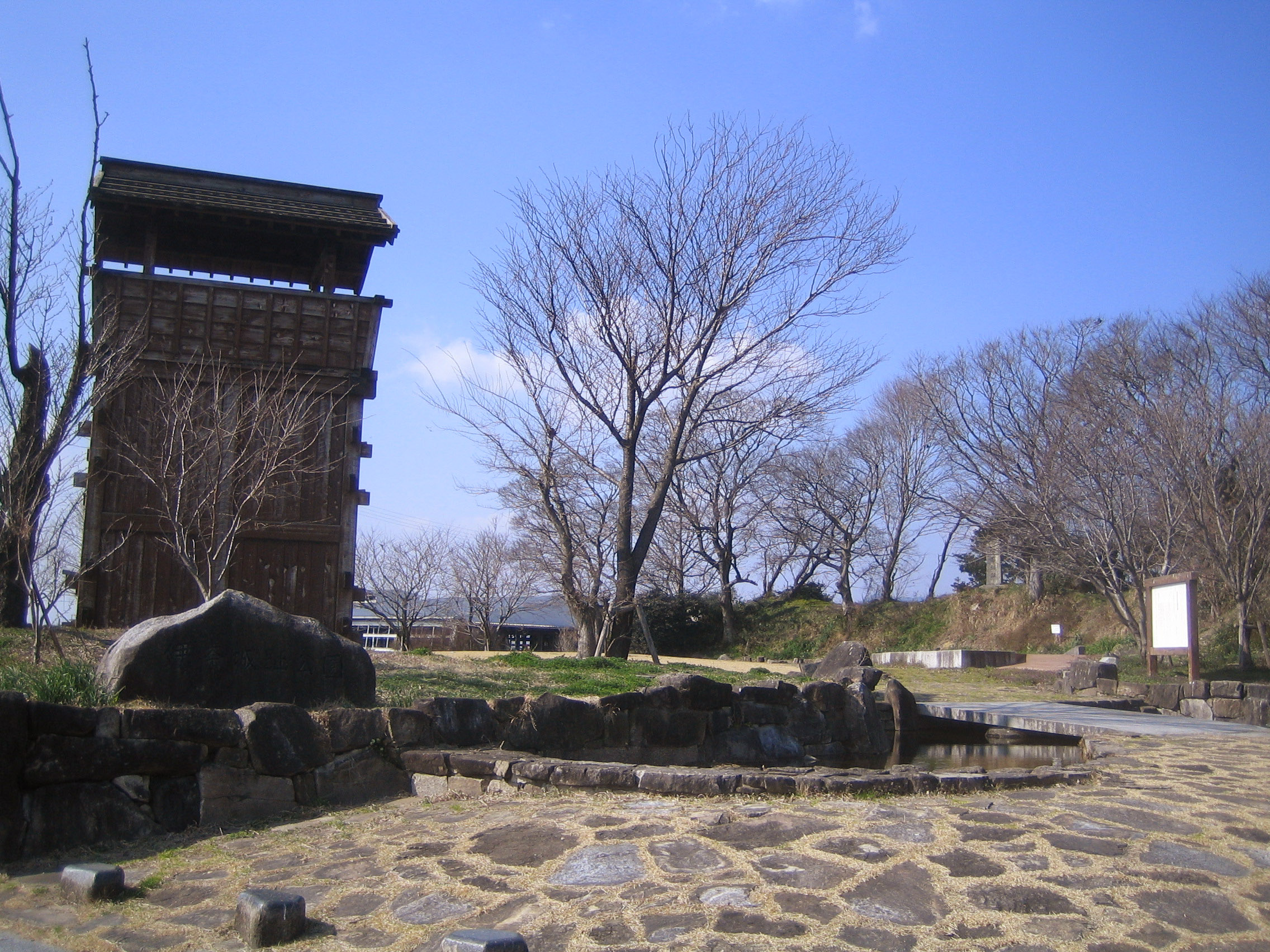
Ruins of the Ina Castle (伊奈城址), in Kozakai, Aichi, Japan

== History ==
The lord of Ina village, Honda Sadatada, built Ina Castle in approximately 1440. It was well sited, for it was surrounded on three sides by rice paddies and rivers and on the fourth by an inlet, which allowed supplies to come into the castle directly from Mikawa Bay. Sadatora's descendants continued to use the castle as their headquarters from which they ruled the area for about 150 years, until Honda Yasutoshi was transferred to the Shimōsa region. Today there is a park on the site of the castle, with a small reconstruction of a tower and explanatory signboards in Japanese.

== Sources ==
https://web.archive.org/web/20110721124402/http://www.kandou10.jp/en/spot/spot103_e02_1.html
