= Osaka Plain =

Plain in Kansai, Japan

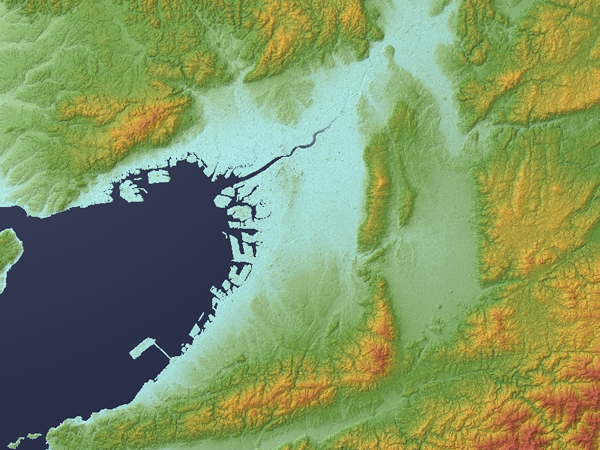
Osaka Plain

The Osaka Plain (大阪平野, Ōsaka Heiya) refers to a 1,600 km^{2} area of flat land, the largest plain in the Kinki region, including a large part of Osaka Prefecture and a southeastern portion of Hyōgo Prefecture. It is bordered on the north by the Hokusetsu Mount Range, on the east by the Ikoma Mount Range and Kongō Range, on the south by the Izumi Mount Range, and on the west by Osaka Bay. On occasion, it is called the Sekkasen Plain (摂河泉平野, Sekkasen Heiya) after the names of former Settsu Province, Kawachi Province and Izumi Province.

Geologically, the plain is considered to be an alluvial plain mainly consisting of hills and plateaus created during the Pliocene and Pleistocene epochs and deltas created during the Holocene by current rivers such as the Yodo River and Yamato River. Prominent hills and plateaus include the Senri Hills, Toyonaka Plateau, and Itami Plateau to the north; the Hirakata Hills and Katano Plateau to the northeast; and the Kasen Hills, Shinodayama Plateau, Mikunigaoka Plateau, and Uemachi Plateau to the south. Major streams are the Muko River, Ina River, Ibaraki River, and Akuta River located in the northern portion; and the Yodo River and Yamato River in the eastern section; and the Ishizu River, Ōtsu River, and Onosato River in the southwestern part of the plain.
