= Yasutoshi =

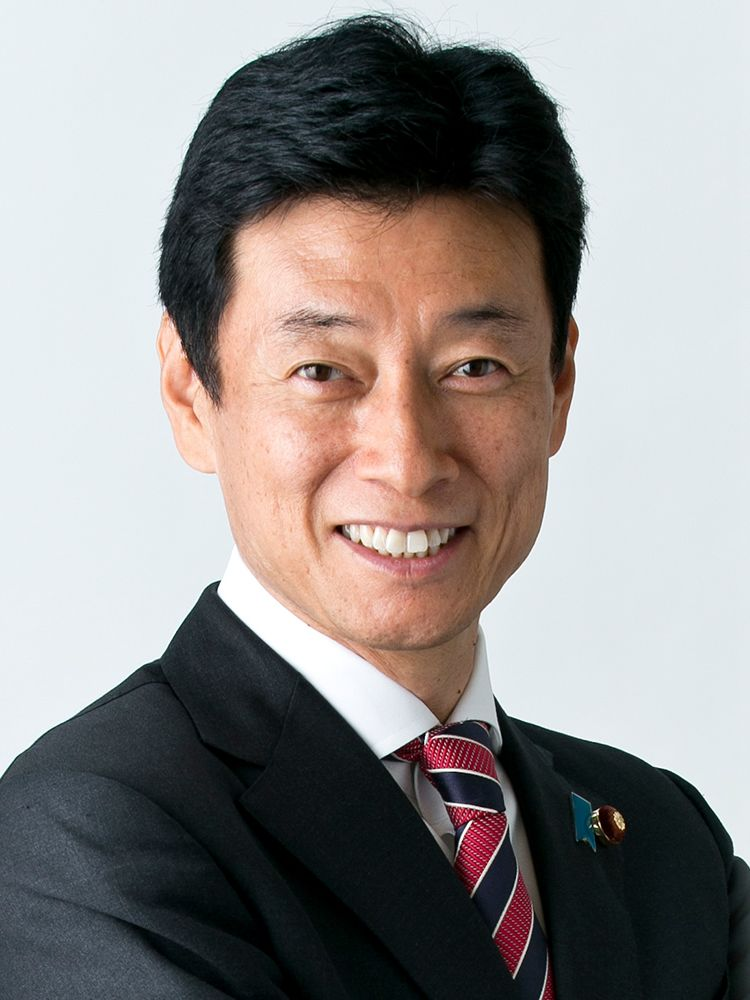
- Yasutoshi Nishimura, Japanese politician
- Pronunciation: jasɯtoɕi (IPA)
- Gender: Male

Origin
- Origin: Japanese
- Meaning: Different meanings depending on the kanji used

Other names
- Alternative spelling: Yasutosi (Kunrei-shiki) Yasutosi (Nihon-shiki) Yasutoshi (Hepburn)

Yasutoshi is a masculine Japanese given name.

== Written forms ==
Yasutoshi can be written using many different combinations of kanji characters. Here are some examples:

- 靖敏, "peaceful, agile"
- 靖俊, "peaceful, talented"
- 靖利, "peaceful, benefit"
- 靖寿, "peaceful, long life"
- 靖年, "peaceful, year"
- 康敏, "healthy, agile"
- 康俊, "healthy, talented"
- 康利, "healthy, benefit"
- 康寿, "healthy, long life"
- 康年, "healthy, year"
- 安敏, "tranquil, agile"
- 安俊, "tranquil, talented"
- 保敏, "preserve, agile"
- 保俊, "preserve, talented"
- 保利, "preserve, benefit"
- 泰敏, "peaceful, agile"
- 泰俊, "peaceful, talented"
- 泰年, "peaceful, year"
- 易利, "divination, benefit"

The name can also be written in hiragana やすとし or katakana ヤストシ.

== Notable people with the name ==
- Yasutoshi Honda (本多 康俊, 1569–1621), Japanese samurai and daimyō
- Yasutoshi Moriyama (森山 泰年) (born 1957), Japanese sport wrestler
- Yasutoshi Motoki (元木 康年; born 1969), Japanese sport wrestler
- Yasutoshi Murakawa (村川 康敏) (born 1971), Japanese screenwriter
- Yasutoshi Nishimura (西村 康稔) (born 1962), Japanese politician
- Yasutoshi Oginishiki (小城錦 康年) (born 1971), Japanese sumo wrestler
- Yasutoshi Miura (三浦 泰年) (born 1965), Japanese footballer
