= Hayashida Domain =

Japanese feudal domain located in Harima Province

Hayashida Domain 林田藩
- under Tokugawa shogunate Japan
- 1617–1871
- Capital: Hayashida jin'ya
- Area
  - Coordinates: 34°54′21″N 134°34′48.5″E
  - Type: Daimyō
- Historical era: Edo period
  - Established: 1617
  - Disestablished: 1871
- Today part of: part of Hyōgo Prefecture

Location of Hayashida jin'ya
Hayashida Domain (Japan)

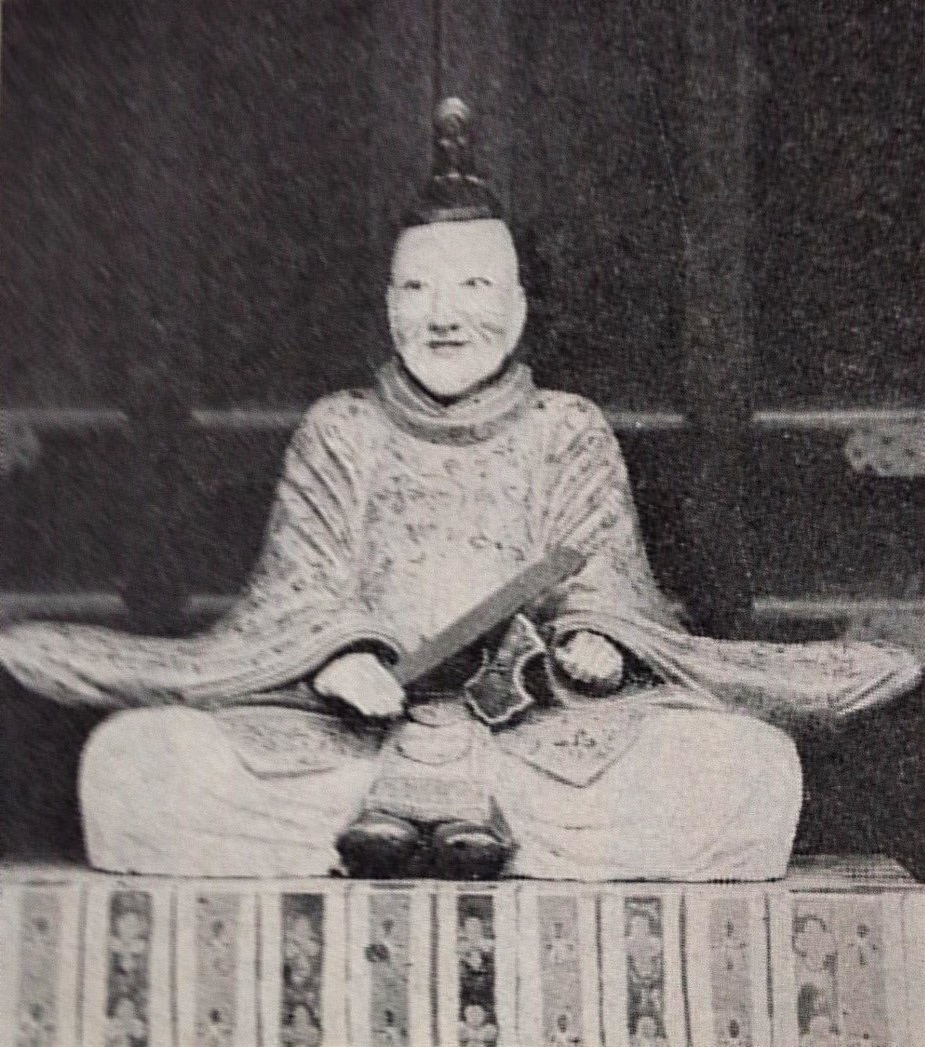
Takebe Masanaga. founder of Hayashida Domain

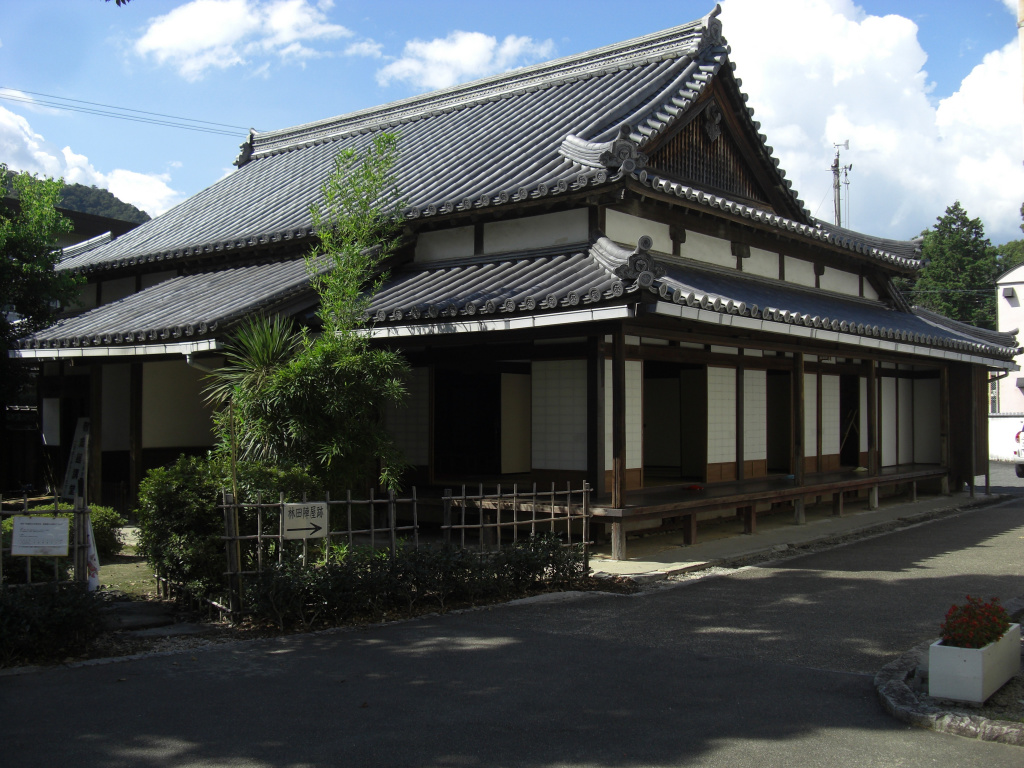
Lecture Hall of Hayashida Domain han school

Hayashida Domain (林田藩, Hayashida-han) was a feudal domain under the Tokugawa shogunate of Edo period Japan, located in Harima Province in what is now the southwestern portion of modern-day Hyōgo Prefecture. It was centered around the Hayashida jin'ya which was located in what is now the city of Himeji, Hyōgo and was controlled by the tozama daimyō Takebe clan throughout all of its history.

== History ==
Takebe Mitsushige was the 700 koku Amagasaki gundai under Toyotomi Hideyoshi, and was married to an adopted daughter of Ikeda Terumasa. Their son, Takebe Masanaga, fought at the side of Ikeda Terumasa's sons at the Siege of Osaka from 1614-1615, and was rewarded by being made daimyō of Amagasaki Domain, an honor which he unusually shared with Ikeda Shigetoshi, with each having a kokudaka of 10,000 koku. This proved to be unwieldy, and when the Ikeda clan was transferred to Himeji Domain, Takebe Masanaga moved a slightly distance away to form Hayashida Domain in 1617. Although a tozama clan, the Takebe ruled the domain unbroken to the Meiji restoration. The 3rd daimyō, Takabe Masanori, served as Ōbangashira, Fushimi-bugyō and as Jisha-bugyō in the shogunal administration. The 7th daimyō, Takabe Masakata, established a Han school in 1794 and the 9th daimyō, Takebe Masanori, also served as Ōbangashira and castellan of Nijō Castle in Kyoto. The final daimyō, Takebe Masayo, served in the guard of Prince Kachō Hirotsune in 1868 and supported the Meiji government in the Boshin War. The clan was ennobled with the kazoku peerage title of shishaku (viscount).

The lecture hall of the han school survives, and is a Himeji City Important Cultural Property.

== Holdings at the end of the Edo period ==
As with most domains in the han system, Hayashida Domain consisted of several discontinuous territories calculated to provide the assigned kokudaka, based on periodic cadastral surveys and projected agricultural yields.

- Harima Province
  - 25 villages in Itto District

== List of daimyō ==
#	Name	Tenure	Courtesy title	Court Rank	kokudaka
Takebe clan, 1617-1871 (Tozama)
1	Takebe Masanaga (建部政長)	1617 - 1667	Tanba-no-kami (丹波守)	Junior 5th Rank, Lower Grade (従五位下)	10,000 koku
2	Takebe Masaaki (建部政明)	1667 - 1669	Tanba-no-kami (丹波守)	Junior 5th Rank, Lower Grade (従五位下)	10,000 koku
3	Takebe Masanoki (建部政宇)	1670 - 1715	Naisho-no-kami (内匠頭)	Junior 5th Rank, Lower Grade (従五位下)	10,000 koku
4	Takebe Masachika (建部政周)	1715 - 1732	Tanba-no-kami (丹波守)	Junior 5th Rank, Lower Grade (従五位下)	10,000 koku
5	Takebe Masatami (建部政民)	1732 - 1762	Tanba-no-kami (丹波守)	Junior 5th Rank, Lower Grade (従五位下)	10,000 koku
6	Takebe Masanori (建部長教)	1762 - 1764	Ōmi-no-kami (近江守)	Junior 5th Rank, Lower Grade (従五位下)	10,000 koku
7	Takebe Masakata (建部政賢)	1764 - 1812	Naisho-no-kami (内匠頭)	Junior 5th Rank, Lower Grade (従五位下)	10,000 koku
8	Takebe Masaatsu (建部政醇)	1812 - 1849	Naisho-no-kami (内匠頭)	Junior 5th Rank, Lower Grade (従五位下)	10,000 koku
9	Takebe Masayori (建部政和)	1849 - 1863	Naisho-no-kami (内匠頭)	Junior 5th Rank, Lower Grade (従五位下)	10,000 koku
10	Takebe Masayo (建部政世)	1863 - 1871	Naisho-no-kami (内匠頭)	Junior 5th Rank, Lower Grade (従五位下)	10,000 koku

== See also ==
- List of Han
- Abolition of the han system
