= Honda Yasushige (Zeze) =

- 本多康穣
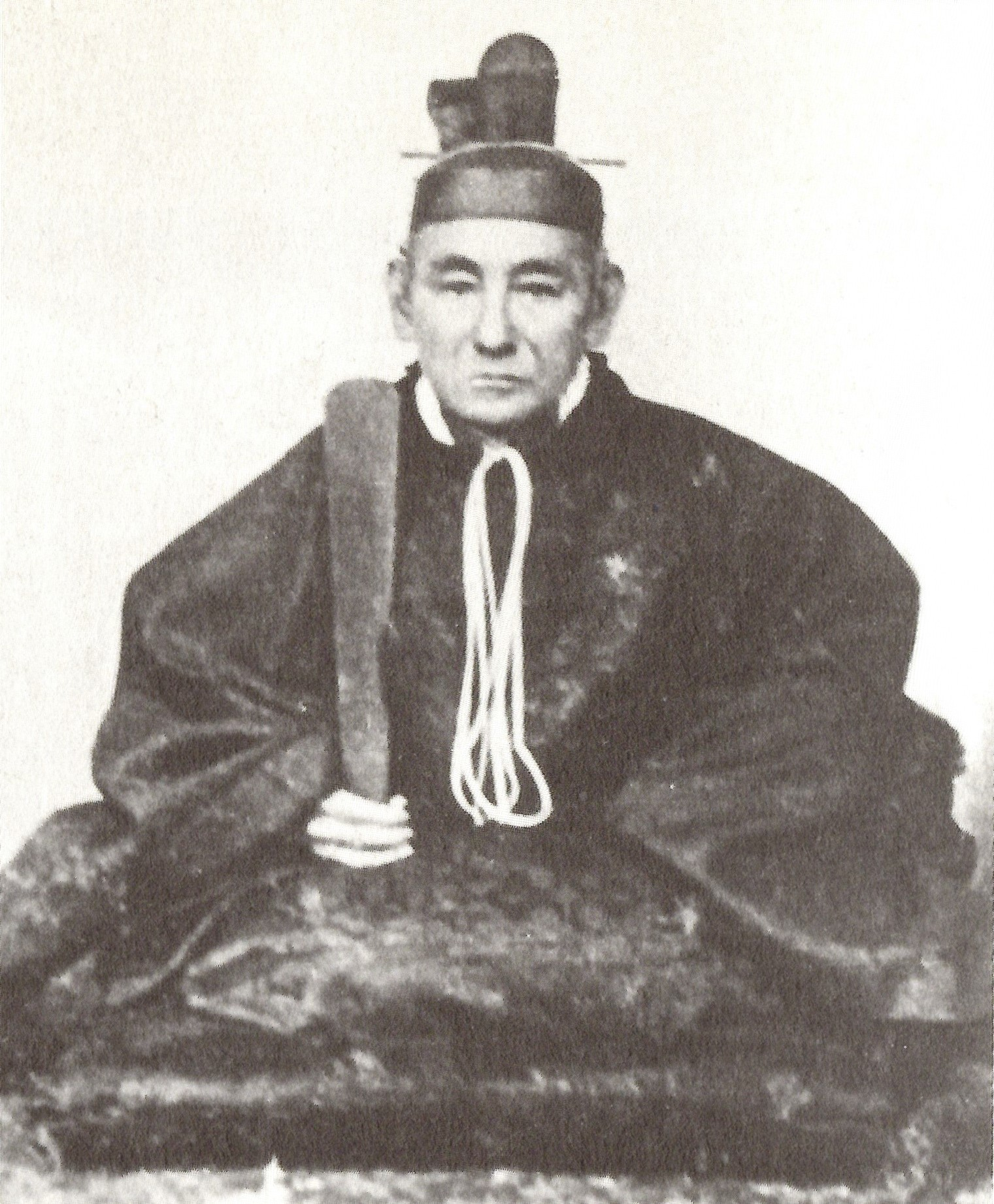
- Honda Yasushige, post-Meiji restoration

13th Daimyō of Zeze Domain
- In office 1856–1868
- Monarchs: Shōgun: Tokugawa Iesada; Tokugawa Iemochi; Tokugawa Yoshinobu
- Preceded by: Honda Yasuaki
- Succeeded by: < position abolished >

Imperial Governor of Zeze
- In office 1869–1871
- Monarch: Emperor Meiji

Personal details
- Born: January 23, 1836
- Died: February 28, 1912 (aged 76)
- Parent: Honda Yasutsugu (father)

Honda Yasushige (本多康穣, January 23, 1836 – February 28, 1912) was the 14th (and final) daimyō of Zeze Domain in Bakumatsu period Japan Before the Meiji Restoration, his courtesy title was Shuzen-no-kami, and his final Court rank was Senior Second Rank.

== Biography ==
Honda Yasushige was born in Zeze as the sixth son of Honda Yasutsugu, the 12th daimyō. He was adopted as successor to his elder brother, Honda Yasuaki, the 13th daimyō in March 1855 and became daimyō on his brother's retirement the following year.

During the Bakumatsu period, he served as a guard for the Kyoto Imperial Palace, and served as a guard in the retinue for Princess Kazu-no-miya on her journey to Edo to marry Shogun Tokugawa Iemochi. He later served as a guard during Emperor Kōmei's visit to Iwashimizu Hachiman-gu to pray for the deliverance of Japan from the Western Powers and their kurofune. However, he opposed the decision of the Tokugawa shogunate to attack Chōshū Domain in the Chōshū expedition, remaining behind in Kyoto. He was assigned to guard the Imperial Palace during the Kinmon incident of 1864. The clan was rent internally between supporters of the shogunate, and the radical pro-Sonnō jōi faction seeking to overturn the shogunate, and as a result, Shogun Tokugawa Iemochi was forced to cancel his plans to stop overnight at Zeze Castle en route to Kyoto to meet with Emperor Kōmei. This led to the "Zeze Castle incident" of 1865, where 11 members of the pro-Sonnō jōi faction were executed for allegedly planning the assassination of Tokugawa Iemochi during his planned stay at Zeze. However, the pro-Sonnō jōi faction soon gained the upper hand after killing Kawase Taihei, the leader of the pro-shogunal faction. At the start of the Boshin War, despite its status as a trusted fudai domain of long-standing, Zeze Domain was one of the first to declare for the new Meiji government. Forces from the domain participated in the attack on Kuwana Domain in Ise Province and in other campaigns of the war.

Following the Meiji restoration, Honda Yasushige was one of the first daimyō to agree to surrendering his title to the new government, and in June 1869 received appointment as imperial governor of Zeze. He served until the abolition of the han system in July 1871 and relocated to Tokyo. He was ennobled with the kazoku peerage title of shishiku (viscount) in 1884. He died in Tokyo in 1912 of a cerebral hemorrhage. His grave is at the Somei Cemetery at Komagome in Toshima, Kyoto.

His wife was a daughter of Sakai Tadaaki, daimyō of Shōnai Domain.
