= Toda Kazuaki =

Toda Kazuaki (戸田 一西; 1542 – August 20, 1604) was a samurai in the service of Tokugawa Ieyasu. In 1601, Ieyasu gave Kazuaki the fiefdom of Zeze (30,000 koku) in Omi.

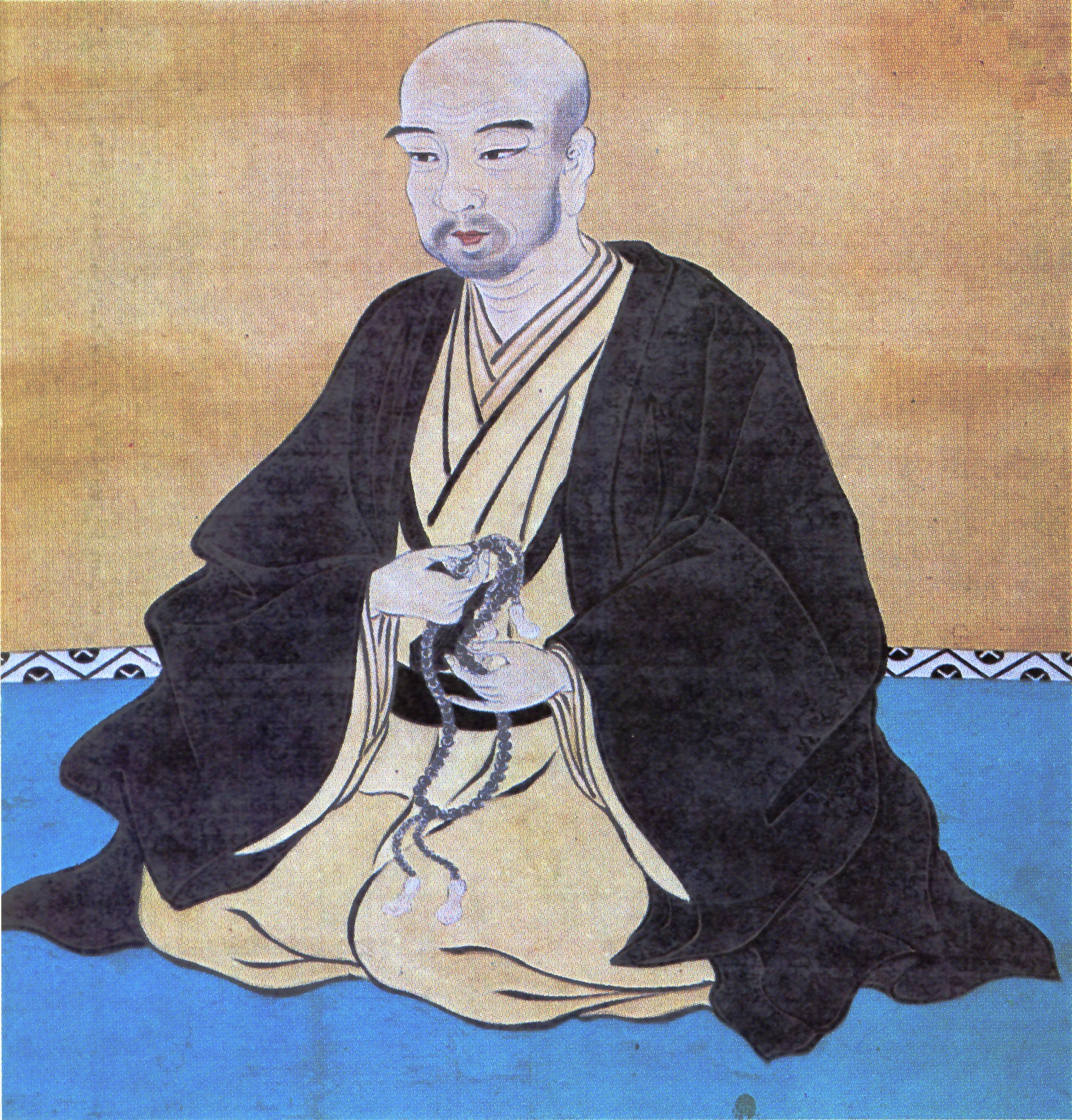
Toda Kazuaki

Preceded by Kyōgoku Takatsugu	Lord of Ōtsu; 1601	Succeeded by none
Preceded by none	Lord of Zeze; 1601–1604	Succeeded by Toda Ujikane
