= Zeze Domain =

Zeze Domain 膳所藩
- Domain of Japan
- 1601–1871
- Capital: Zeze Castle
- Area
  - Coordinates: 34°59′42.98″N 135°53′43.29″E
  - Type: Daimyō
- Historical era: Edo period
  - Established: 1601
  - Disestablished: 1871
- Today part of: part of Shiga Prefecture

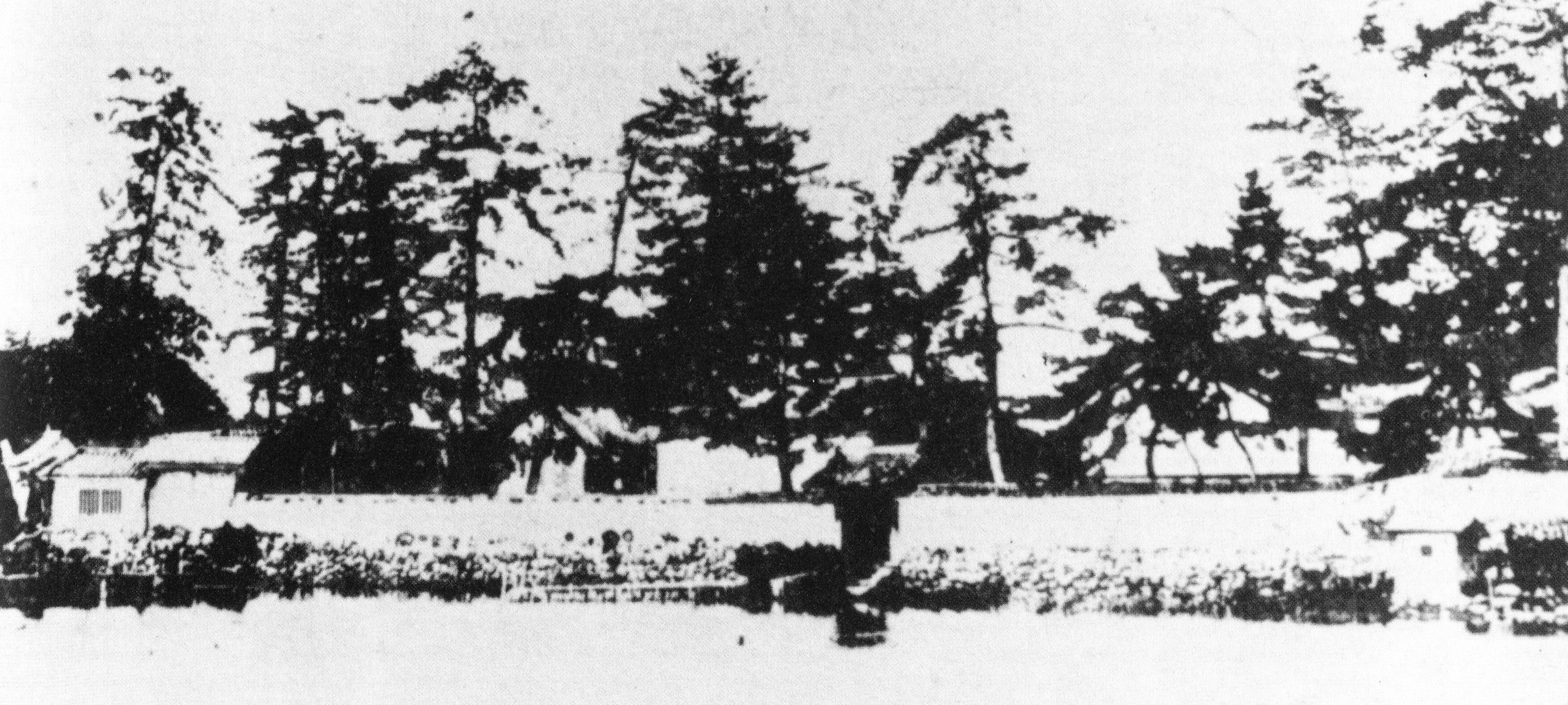
Zeze Castle

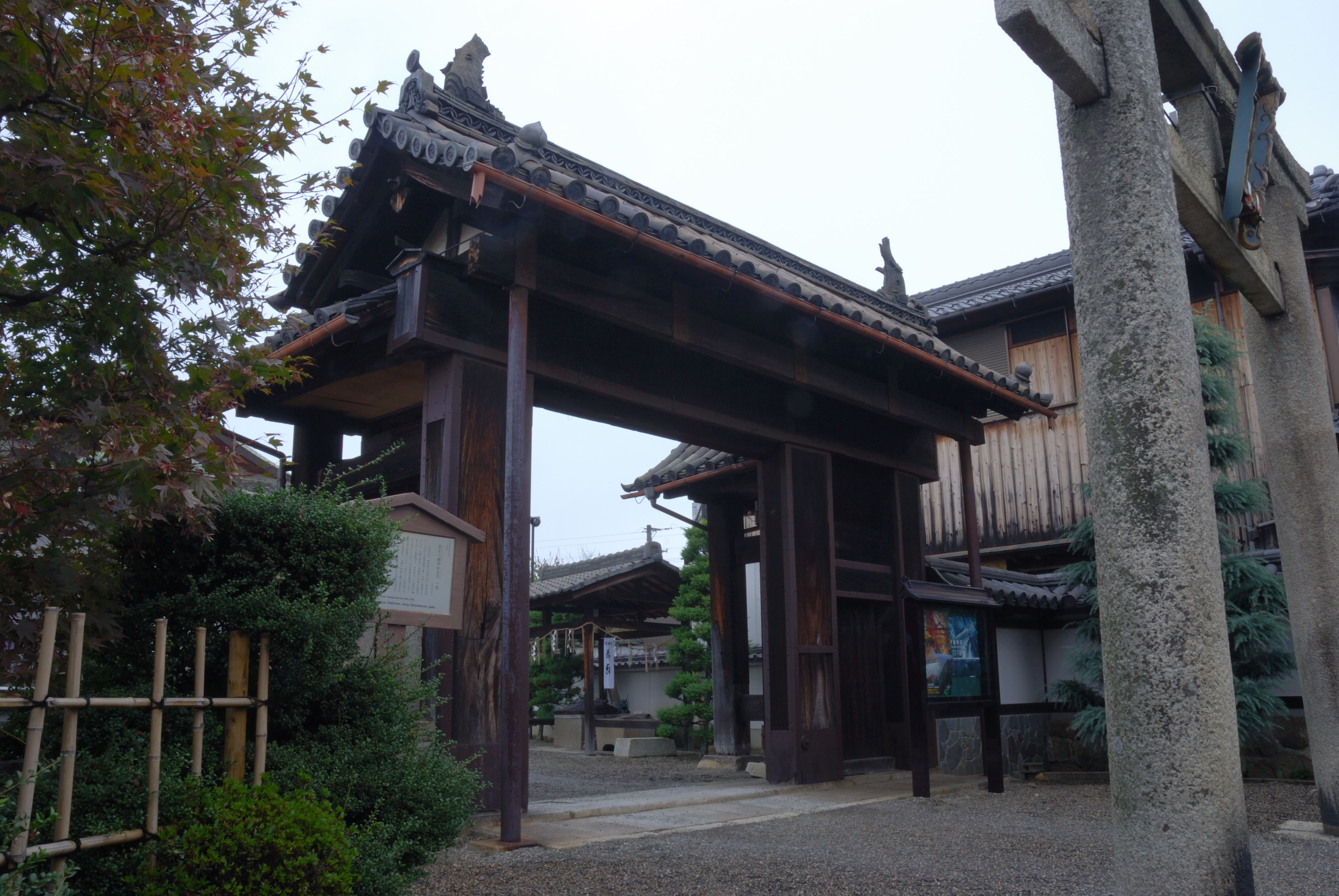
Gate at Zeze Castle

Zeze Domain (膳所藩, Zeze-han) was a fudai feudal domain under the Tokugawa shogunate of Edo period Japan. It was located in southern Ōmi Province, in the Kansai region of central Honshu. The domain was centered at Zeze Castle, located on the shore of Lake Biwa in what is now the city of Ōtsu in Shiga Prefecture.

== History ==
Zeze controlled entry into Kyoto from the east, and was thus of great strategic importance to the Tokugawa shogunate. As with many of the fudai domains of the early Edo period, the control of Zeze Domain changed frequently between various clans; however, after the appointment of a cadet branch of the Honda clan in 1651, the domain remained under Honda control until the end of the shogunate. With a kokudaka of 70,00 koku at its height, it was the second largest domain in Ōmi Province after Hikone Domain.

In 1601, shortly after the Battle of Sekigahara, Tokugawa Ieyasu ordered then construction of Zeze Castle, and assigned Toda Kazuaki, formerly 5000 koku hatamoto with holdings in Musashi Province to be daimyō of the new 30,000 koku domain. He built the jōkamachi and developed shijimi clans as a local industry. His son, Toda Ujikane distinguished himself at the Siege of Osaka and was awarded with the larger Amagasaki Domain. Zeze was awarded to Honda Yasutoshi, who had also distinguished himself at the Siege of Osaka. His son, Honda Toshitsugu, was relocated to Nishio Domain in 1621. Zeze then passed briefly to the Suganuma and the Ishikawa clans, before being returned to Honda Yoshitsugu in 1651, but with an increase in kokudaka to 70,000 koku.

Under the early days of Hondo rule, the domain prospered greatly with flood control works and the opening of new rice lands continuing to revenues ad with welfare measures for the poor. However, by the middle of the Edo period, the domain's finances began to falter, and under the 6th daimyō Honda Yasutada, failed attempts at fiscal reform only made matters worse. There were widespread peasant's uprisings around 1781. Conditions continued to deteriorate until the time of the 10th daimyō Honda Yasusada, with conflict erupting between various factions of the domain's retainers over reform measures. The situation resulted in intervention by the shogunate and the purge of a number of senior retainers. The situation stabilized by 1808, when a han school was opened.

During the Bakumatsu period, Zeze was violently divided between the pro-Sonnō Jōi faction and the pro-shogunate faction. The pro-shogunate faction, at times assisted by the Shinsengumi killed a number of the pro-Sonnō Jōi faction, including some prominent officials. This created a backlash in popular opinion, and with the start of the Boshin War, the domain quickly sided with the imperial cause and sent troops to attack Kuwana Domain. As with other domains, Zeze was abolished in 1871 with the abolition of the han system, becoming Zeze Prefecture, which was merged with Ōtsu prefecture, and subsequently Shiga Prefecture.

== Bakumatsu period holdings ==
As with most domains in the han system, Ōmizo Domain consisted of a discontinuous territories calculated to provide the assigned kokudaka, based on periodic cadastral surveys and projected agricultural yields.

- Ōmi Province
  - 21 villages in Shiga District
  - 76 villages in Kurita District
  - 1 village in Kōka District
  - 7 villages in Azai District
  - 5 villages in Ika District
  - 18 villages in Takashima District
- Kawachi Province
  - 15 villages in Nishgori District

== List of daimyō ==
#	Name	Tenure	Courtesy title	Court Rank	kokudaka
Toda clan, 1601-1617 (fudai)
1	Toda Kazuaki (戸田一西)	1601–1604	Uneme-no-kami (采女正)	Junior 5th Rank, Lower Grade (従五位下)	30,000 koku
2	Toda Ujikane (戸田氏鉄)	1604–1617	Uneme-no-kami (采女正)	Junior 5th Rank, Lower Grade (従五位下)	30,000 koku
Honda clan, 1617-1621 (fudai)
1	Honda Yasutoshi (本多康俊)	1617–1621	Hayato no Shō (隼人正)	Junior 5th Rank, Lower Grade (従五位下)	30,000 koku
2	Honda Yasutsugu (本多俊次)	1621–1621	Shimōsa-no-kami (下総守)	Junior 5th Rank, Lower Grade (従五位下)	30,000 koku
Suganuma clan, 1621-1634 (fudai)
1	Suganuma Sadayoshi (菅沼定芳)	1621–1634	Oribe-no-tsukasa (織部正)	Junior 5th Rank, Lower Grade (従五位下)	31,000 koku
Ishikawa clan, 1634-1651 (fudai)
1	Ishikawa Tadafusa (石川忠総)	1634–1650	Tonomo-no-kami (主殿頭)	Junior 4th Rank, Lower Grade (従四位下)	53,000 koku
2	Ishikawa Noriyuki (石川憲之)	1651–1651	Tonomo-no-kami (主殿頭)	53,000 koku	
Honda clan, 1651-1871 (fudai)
2	Honda Yasutsugu (reinstated) (本多俊次)	1651–1664	Shimōsa-no-kami (下総守)	Junior 5th Rank, Lower Grade (従五位下)	70,000 koku
3	Honda Yasumasa (本多康将)	1664–1679	Hyōbu-shōyu (兵部少輔)	Junior 5th Rank, Lower Grade (従五位下)	70,000 koku
4	Honda Yasuyoshi (本多康慶)	1679–1714	Oki-no-kami (隠岐守)	Junior 5th Rank, Lower Grade (従五位下)	70,000 koku
5	Honda Yasunobu (本多康命)	1714–1719	Shimōsa-no-kami (下総守)	Junior 5th Rank, Lower Grade (従五位下)	70,000 koku
6	Honda Yasutoshi (本多康敏)	1719–1747	Shuzen-no-kami (主膳正)	Junior 5th Rank, Lower Grade (従五位下)	70,000 koku
7	Honda Yasutake (本多康桓)	1747–1765	Oki-no-kami (隠岐守)	Junior 5th Rank, Lower Grade (従五位下)	70,000 koku
8	Honda Yasumasa (本多康政)	1765–1765	Shimōsa-no-kami (下総守)	Junior 5th Rank, Lower Grade (従五位下)	70,000 koku
9	Honda Yasutomo (本多康伴)	1765–1771	Oki-no-kami (隠岐守)	Junior 5th Rank, Lower Grade (従五位下)	70,000 koku
10	Honda Yasutada (本多康匡)	1771–1781	Shuzen-no-kami (主膳正)	Junior 5th Rank, Lower Grade (従五位下)	70,000 koku
11	Honda Yasusada (本多康完)	1781–1806	Oki-no-kami (隠岐守)	Junior 5th Rank, Lower Grade (従五位下)	70,000 koku
12	Honda Yasutsugu (本多康禎)	1806–1847	Hyōbu-daisuke (兵部大輔)	Junior 4th Rank, Lower Grade (従四位下)	70,000 koku
13	Honda Yasuaki (本多康融)	1847–1856	Oki-no-kami (隠岐守)	Junior 5th Rank, Lower Grade (従五位下)	70,000 koku
14	Honda Yasushige (本多康融)	1856–1871	Shuzen-no-kami (主膳正)	Junior 2nd Rank (従二位)	70,000 koku

== See also ==
- List of Han
