= Honda Tadatsugu =

Japanese samurai

Honda Tadatsugu (本多 忠次, 1547–1612) was a Japanese military commander of the early Edo period who served Tokugawa Ieyasu. He was one of Ieyasu's most trusted retainers.

With Ieyasu, he attacked the Yoshida Castle in Mikawa Province.
