= Honda Yasutoshi (1569–1621) =

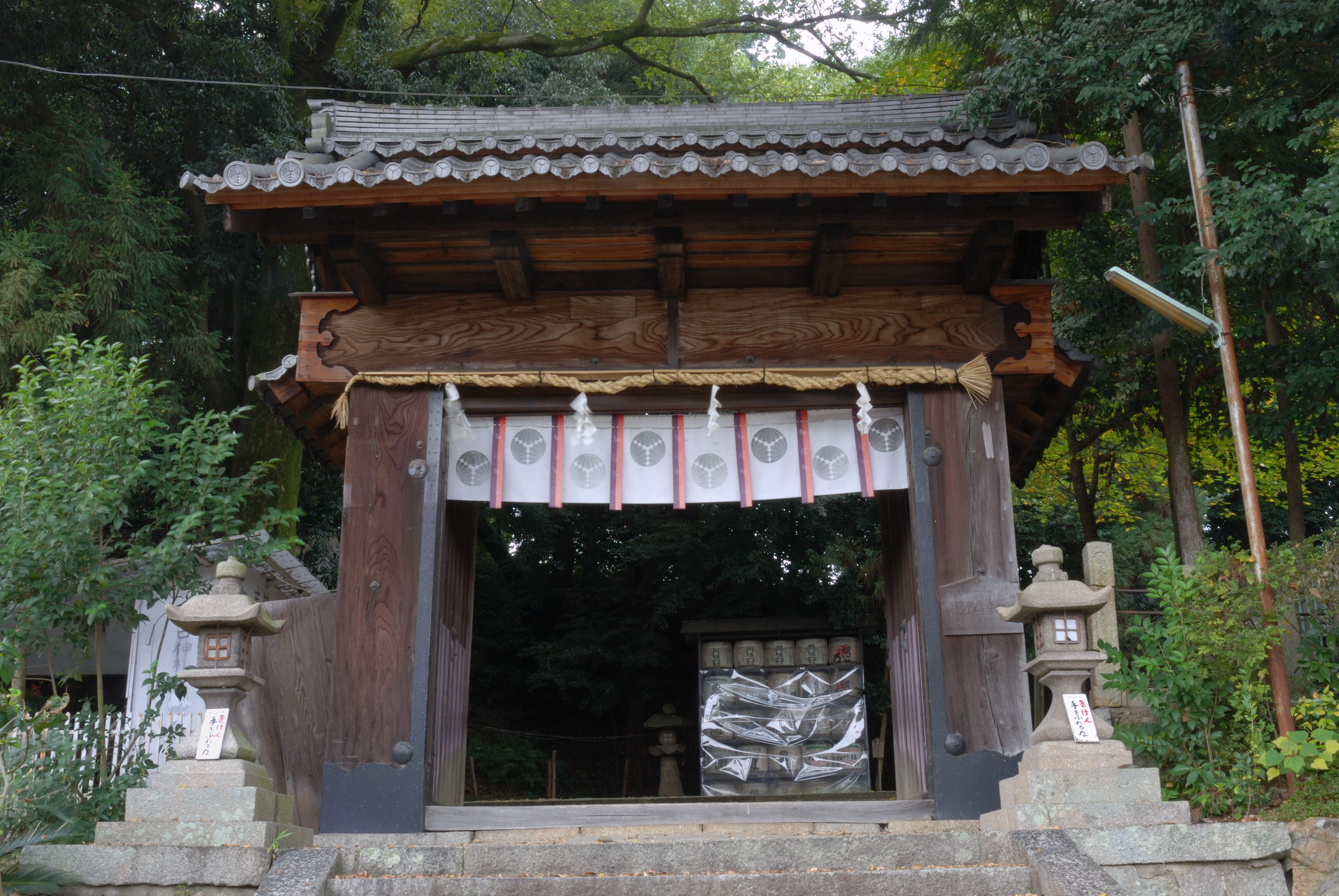
A gate from Yasutoshi's castle of Zeze

Honda Yasutoshi (本多 康俊) (1570 – March 29, 1622) was a Japanese samurai of the Azuchi–Momoyama Period through early Edo period, who served the Tokugawa clan; he later became a daimyō. Yasutoshi was the second son of Sakai Tadatsugu; after a time as a hostage to the Oda clan; he was adopted by Honda Tadatsugu in 1580. Upon Tokugawa Ieyasu's move to the Kantō region in 1590, Yasutoshi was granted 5,000 koku of land in Shimōsa Province.

Yasutoshi served at the Battle of Sekigahara in 1600, for his service there, he was awarded with lordship of the Nishio Domain of Mikawa (20,000 koku). During the Siege of Osaka in 1614, he defended Zeze Castle, and during the battles in the following year, took part in the actual fighting, reportedly taking over 105 heads. As a reward for his service at Osaka, he was moved to the Zeze Domain, and his stipend was increased to 30,000 koku.

Yasutoshi died in early 1621 at the age of 53.

Preceded by none	1st Daimyō of Nishio (Honda); 1601–1617	Succeeded by Matsudaira Shigenari
Preceded by Toda Ujikane	1st Daimyō of Zeze (Honda); 1617–1621	Succeeded by Honda Toshitsugu
