= Amagasaki Domain =

Japanese feudal domain located in Settsu Province

Amagasaki Domain 尼崎藩
- under Tokugawa shogunate Japan
- 1615–1871
- Capital: Amagasaki Castle
- Area
  - Coordinates: 34°42′51.757″N 135°25′14.005″E
- Government
  - Type: Daimyō
- Historical era: Edo period
  - Established: 1615
  - Disestablished: 1871
- Today part of: part of Hyōgo Prefecture

Location of Amagasaki Castle
Amagasaki Domain (Japan)

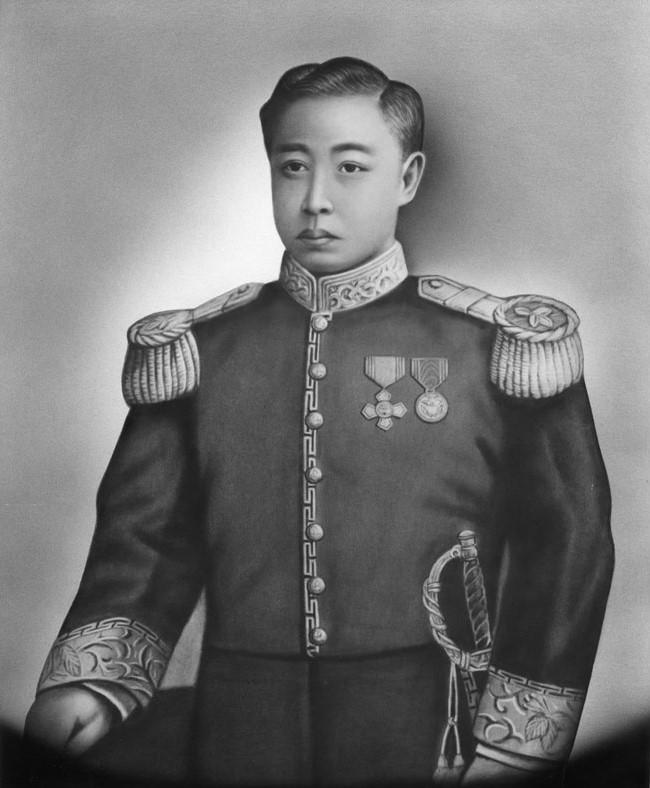
Matsudaira Tadaoka, last daimyō of Amagasaki

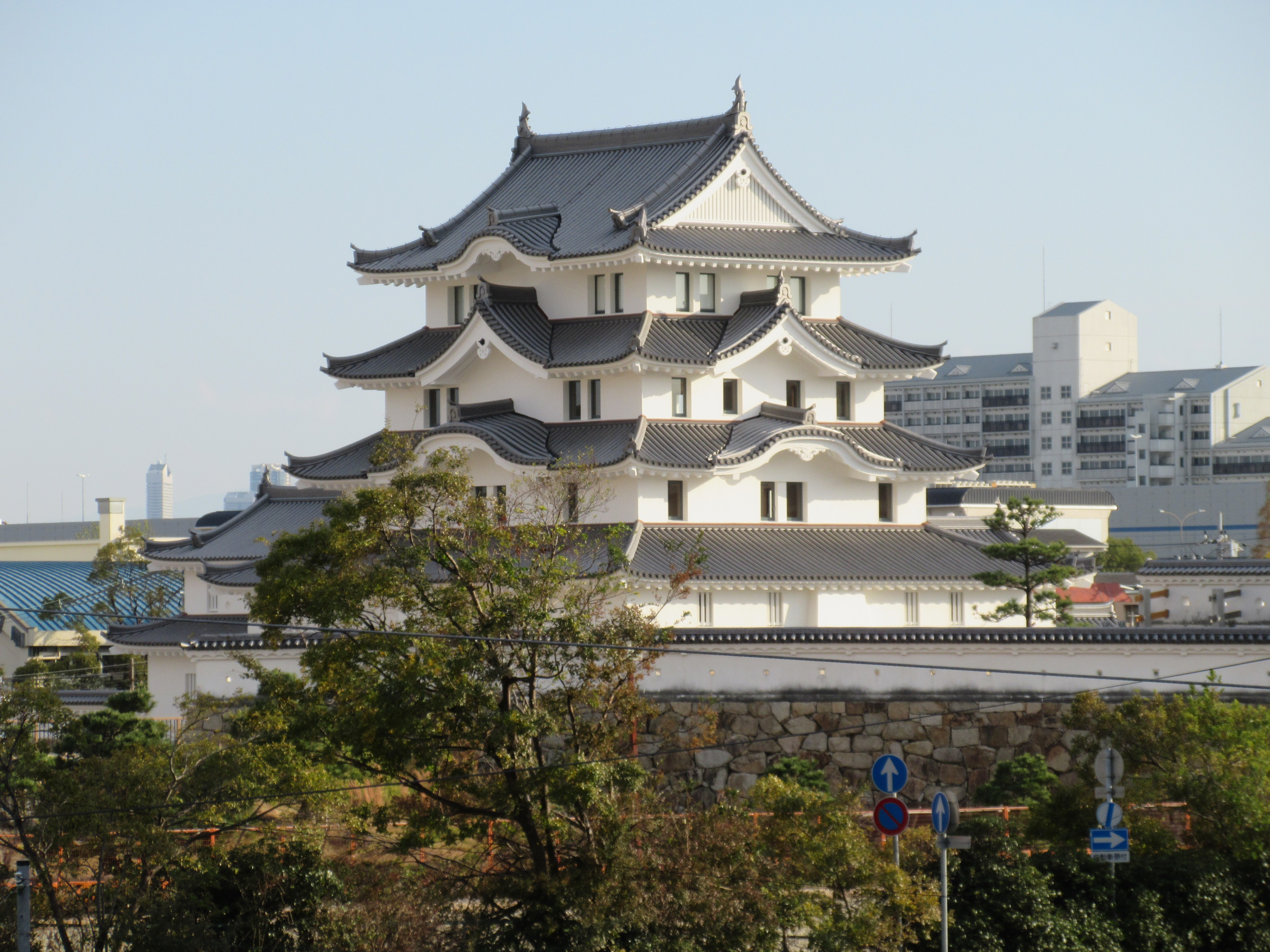
Reconstructed Amagasaki Castle tenshu

Amagasaki Domain (尼崎藩, Amagasaki-han) was a feudal domain under the Tokugawa shogunate of Edo period Japan, located in Settsu Province in what is now the southeastern portion of modern-day Hyōgo Prefecture. It had its administrative headquarters at Amagasaki Castle. The domain extended over parts of Settsu Province that correspond to portions of the cities of Amagasaki, Nishinomiya, Ashiya, Kobe, Itami, and Takarazuka, in modern-day Hyōgo Prefecture. It was controlled by the fudai daimyō Aoyama clan followed by the Sakurai-branch of the Matsudaira clan throughout most of its history.

== History ==
Takebe Mitsushige was the 700 koku Amagasaki gundai under Toyotomi Hideyoshi, and was married to an adopted daughter of Ikeda Terumasa. In 1615, his son Takebe Matsunaga distinguished himself in the Siege of Osaka and as a result, he was awarded, jointly with his uncle Ikeda Shigetoshi, a 10,000 koku holding in northern Settsu Province, centered on Kawabe and Nishinari districts. This was the start of Amagasaki Domain. In 1617, Takebe Masanaga was transferred to Hayashida Domain and Ikeda Shigetoshi to Ikeda Domain, both in Harima Province. They were replaced by Toda Ujikane, formerly of Zeze Domain, with a kokudaka of 50,000 koku. He constructed Amagasaki Castle. In 1635 he was promoted to Ogaki Domain in Mino Province, and replaced by Aoyama Yoshinari, formerly of Kakegawa Domain in Tōtōmi Province. By developing new rice lands, he raised his kokudaka to 54,000 koku, but his son Aoyama Yukinari created a cadet branch of the clan, resulting in a reduction to 48,000 koku. The Aoyama ruled until 1711, and the period was a prosperous one for Amagasaki Domain.

The Aoyama were transferred to Iiyama Domainin Shinano Province, and Amagasaki was given to former Kakegawa daimyō Matsudaira Tadataka of the Sakurai-branch of the Matsudaira clan. The domain was reduced to 40,000 koku. Later, the Tokugawa shogunate increased the kokudaka to 45,000 koku with the shogunate exchanging 62 villages in Settsu for 71 in Harima Province; however, 36 of the villages in Settsu were wealthy villages known for their sake brewing industry, whereas the villages in Harima were rural and were scattered in various locations, making their administration difficult. As a result, although the nominal kokudaka had increased by 5000 koku, the actual kokudaka decreased sharply.

In January 1868, Matsudaira Tadaoki, the last daimyō, pledged allegiance to the Imperial Court in the Boshin War, and in February of the same year, he changed his surname to "Sakurai" under the direction of the new Meiji government. In 1871, the domain became "Amagasaki Prefecture" due to the abolition of the han system, and was incorporated into Hyōgo Prefecture the following year. Matsudaira Tadaoki was later made a viscount (shishaku) in the kazoku peerage and later became one of the founders of Hakuaisha (later known as the Japanese Red Cross Society) during the Satsuma Rebellion.

== Holdings at the end of the Edo period ==
As with most domains in the han system, Amagasaki Domain consisted of several discontinuous territories calculated to provide the assigned kokudaka, based on periodic cadastral surveys and projected agricultural yields.

- Settsu Province
  - 19 villages in Ubara District
  - 28 villages in Muko District
  - 32 villages in Kawabe District
  - 2 villages in [Arima District
- Harima Province
  - 9 villages in Taka District
  - 31 villages in Akō District
  - 9 villages in Shisō District

== List of daimyō ==
#	Name	Tenure	Courtesy title	Court Rank	kokudaka
Takebe clan, 1615-1617 (Tozama)
1	Takebe Masanaga (建部政長)	1615 - 1617	Tanba-no-kami (丹波守)	Junior 5th Rank, Lower Grade (従五位下)	10,000 koku
Ikeda clan, 1615-1617 (Tozama)
1	Ikeda Shigetoshi (池田重利)	1615 - 1617	Echizen-no-kami (越前守)	Junior 5th Rank, Lower Grade (従五位下)	10,000 koku
Toda clan, 1617-1635 (Fudai)
1	Toda Ujitetsu (戸田氏鉄)	1617 - 1635	Uneme-no-kami (采女正)	Junior 5th Rank, Lower Grade (従五位下)	50,000 koku
Aoyama clan, 1635-1711 (Fudai)
1	Aoyama Yoshinari (青山幸成)	1635 - 1643	Okura-shoyu (大蔵少輔)	Junior 5th Rank, Lower Grade (従五位下)	50,000 -> 54,000-> 48,000 koku
2	Aoyama Yoshitoshi (青山幸利)	1643 - 1684	Daizen-no-suke (大膳亮)	Junior 5th Rank, Lower Grade (従五位下)	50,000 koku
3	Aoyama Yoshimasa (青山幸督)	1684 - 1710	Harima-no-kami (播磨守)	Junior 5th Rank, Lower Grade (従五位下)	50,000 -> 48,000 koku
4	Aoyama Yoshihide (青山幸秀)	1710 - 1711	Daizen-no-suke (大膳亮)	Junior 5th Rank, Lower Grade (従五位下)	48,000 koku
Sakurai-Matsudaira clan, 1711-1871 (Fudai)
1	Matsudaira Tadataka (松平忠喬)	1711 - 1751	Iwami-no-kami (石見守)	Junior 4th Rank, Lower Grade (従四位下)	48,000->45,000 -> 45,000 koku
2	Matsudaira Tadaakira (松平忠名)	1751 - 1766	Totomi-no-kami (遠江守)	Junior 5th Rank, Lower Grade (従五位下)	45,000 koku
3	Matsudaira Tadatsugu (松平忠告)	1766 - 1805	Totomi-no-kami (遠江守)	Junior 5th Rank, Lower Grade (従五位下)	45,000 koku
4	Matsudaira Tadatomi (松平忠宝)	1805 - 1813	Totomi-no-kami (遠江守))	Junior 5th Rank, Lower Grade (従五位下)	45,000 koku
5	Matsudaira Tadanori (松平忠誨)	1813 - 1829	Totomi-no-kami (遠江守)	Junior 5th Rank, Lower Grade (従五位下)	45,000 koku
6	Matsudaira Tadanaga (松平忠栄)	1829 - 1861	Totomi-no-kami (遠江守)	Junior 5th Rank, Lower Grade (従五位下)	45,000 koku
7	Matsudaira Tadaoki (松平忠興)	1861 - 1871	Hyogo-no-kami (兵庫頭)	Junior 5th Rank, Lower Grade (従五位下)	45,000 koku

== See also ==
- List of Han
- Abolition of the han system
