= Settsu Province =

Former province of Japan

Map of Japanese provinces (1868) with Settsu Province highlighted

Settsu Province (摂津国, Settsu no Kuni; Japanese pronunciation: [sé̞t̚.t͡sɨ̀ (nò̞ kɯ̈̀.ɲ̟ì), sè̞t̚.t͡sɨ́ (nò̞ kɯ̈̀.ɲ̟ì), sè̞t̚.t͡sɨ́ (nó̞ kɯ̈́.ɲ̟í)]) was a province of Japan, which today comprises the southeastern part of Hyōgo Prefecture and the northern part of Osaka Prefecture. It was also referred to as Tsu Province (津国, Tsu no Kuni; [t͡sɨ́ (nò̞ kɯ̈̀.ɲ̟ì)]) or Sesshū (摂州).

Osaka and Osaka Castle were the main center of the province. Most of Settsu's area comprises the modern day cities of Osaka and Kōbe.

== History ==
During the Sengoku period, the Miyoshi clan ruled Settsu and its neighbors, Izumi and Kawachi, until they were conquered by Oda Nobunaga. The provinces were ruled subsequently by Toyotomi Hideyoshi. The regents of Hideyoshi's son soon quarreled, and when Ishida Mitsunari lost the Battle of Sekigahara, the area was given to relatives of Tokugawa Ieyasu. It was from then on divided into several domains, including the Asada Domain.

Sumiyoshi taisha was designated as the chief Shinto shrine (ichinomiya) for the province.

During the Sengoku period Settsu became the main exporting centre of matchlock firearms to the rest of Japan.

The Kohama style (小浜流, Kohama-ryū) of sake brewing was practiced at the Kohama-juku (小浜宿) in the Amagasaki Domain of Settsu Province during the Edo period.

== Historical districts ==
- Hyōgo Prefecture
  - Arima District (有馬郡) - dissolved on July 1, 1958
  - Kawabe District (川辺郡)
  - Muko District (武庫郡) - absorbed Ubara and Yatabe Districts on April 1, 1896; dissolved on April 1, 1954
  - Ubara District (菟原郡) - merged into Muko District (along with Yatabe District) on April 1, 1896
  - Yatabe District (八部郡) - merged into Muko District (along with Ubara District District) on April 1, 1896
- Osaka Prefecture
  - Higashinari District (東成郡) - absorbed Sumiyoshi District on April 1, 1896; dissolved on April 1, 1925
  - Nishinari District (西成郡) - dissolved on April 1, 1925
  - Nose District (能勢郡) - merged with Teshima District to become Toyono District (豊能郡) on April 1, 1896
  - Shimakami District (島上郡) - merged with Shimashimo District to become Mishima District (三島郡) on April 1, 1896
  - Shimashimo District (島下郡) - merged with Shimakami District to become Mishima District on April 1, 1896
  - Sumiyoshi District (住吉郡) - merged into Higashinari District on April 1, 1896
  - Teshima District (豊島郡) - merged with Nose District to become Toyono District on April 1, 1896
