= Kida Station =

Railway station in Ama, Aichi Prefecture, Japan

Kida Station 木田駅

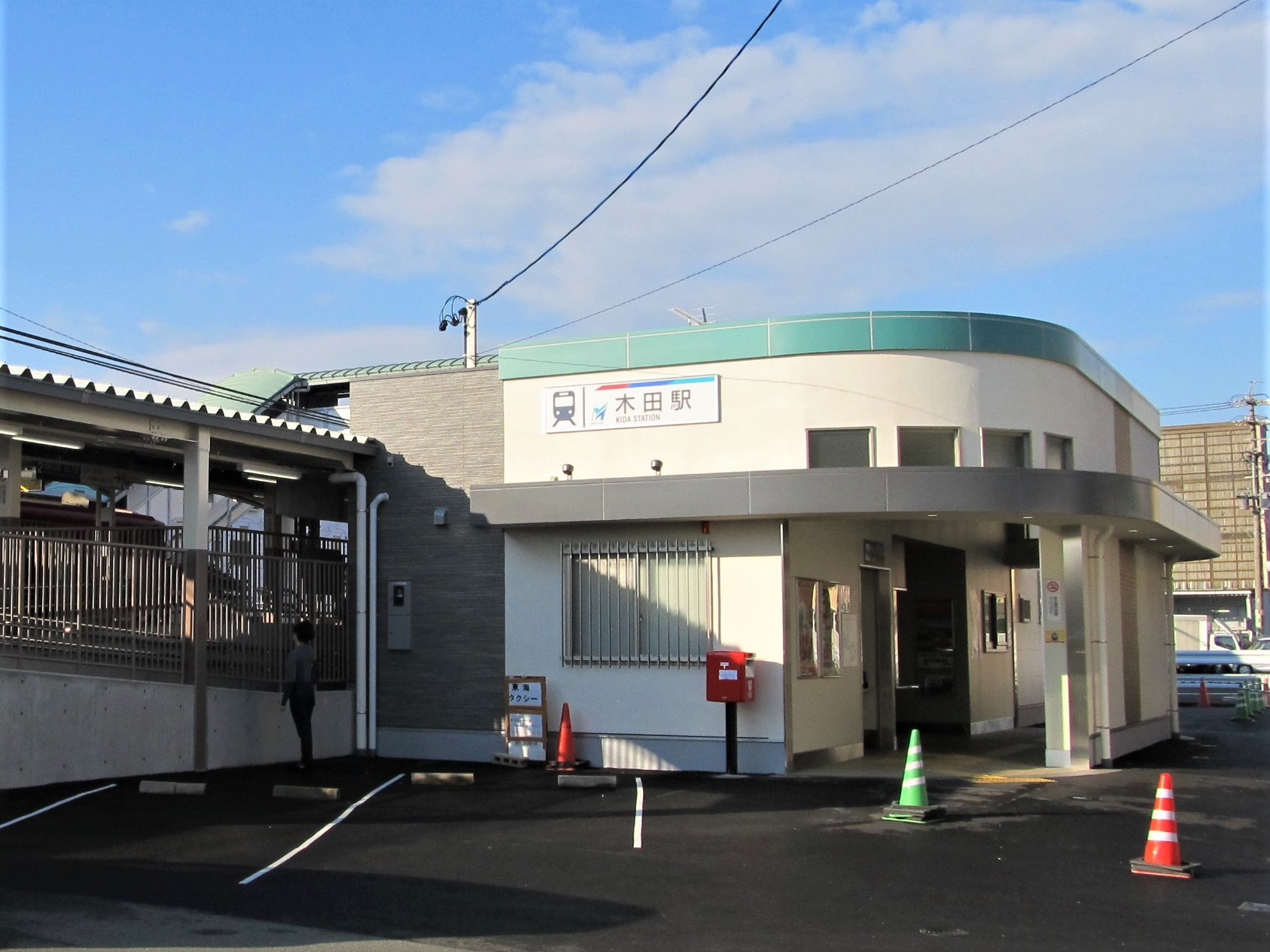
- Kida Station North Gate November 2018

General information
- Location: Michishita-54-2 Kida, Ama-shi, Aichi-ken 490-1222; Japan
- Coordinates: 35.1954°N 136.7881°E
- Operator: Meitetsu
- Line: ■ Tsushima Line
- Distance: 5.2 kilometers from Sukaguchi
- Platforms: 2 side platforms

Other information
- Status: Staffed
- Station code: TB03
- Website: Official website

History
- Opened: January 23, 1914

Passengers
- FY2017: 6,682 daily
Location
- Location within Aichi Prefecture Location within Japan

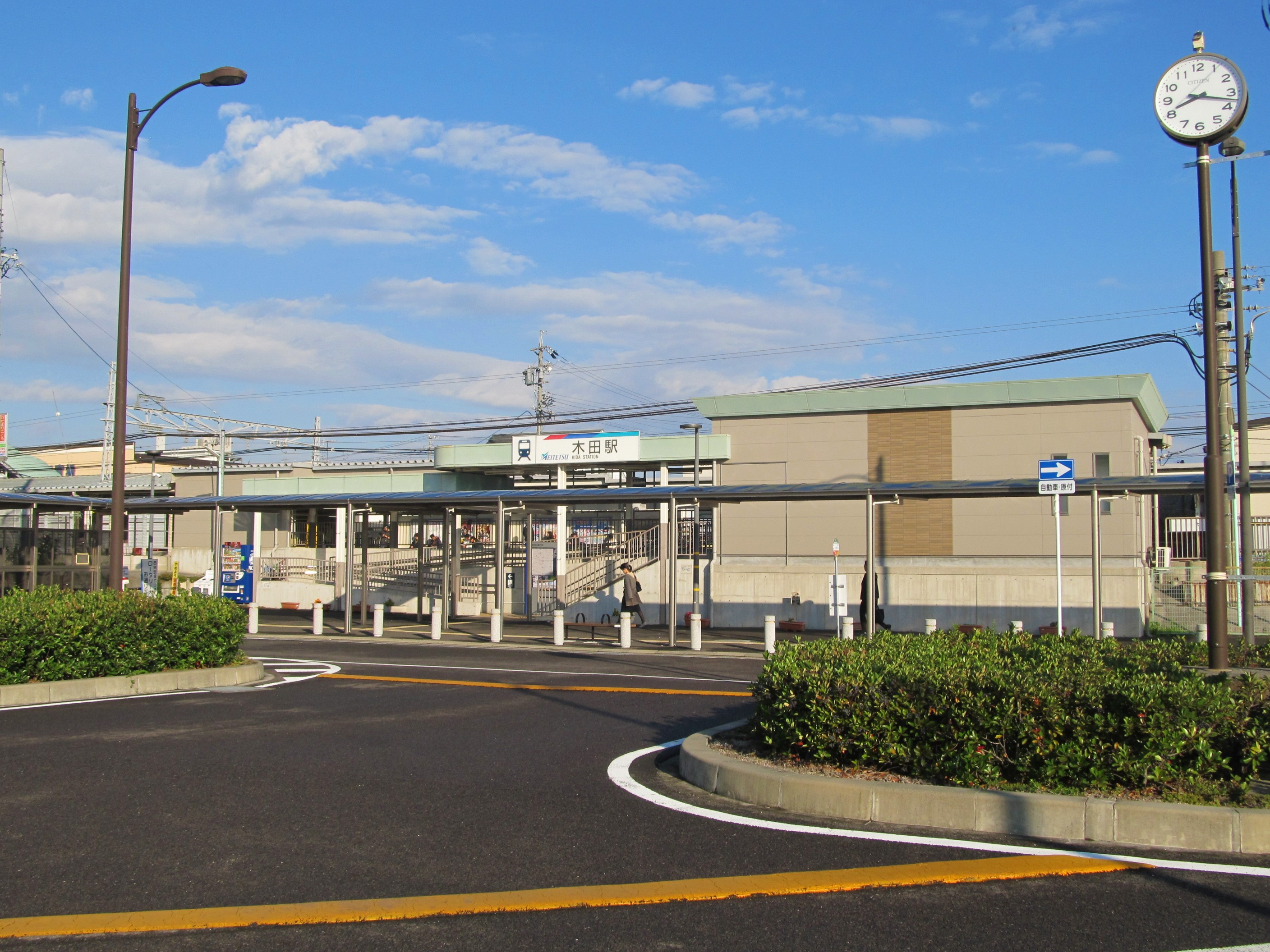
Kida Station South Gate

Kida Station (木田駅, Kida-eki) is a railway station in the city of Ama, Aichi Prefecture, Japan, operated by Meitetsu.

== Lines ==
Kida Station is served by the Meitetsu Tsushima Line, and is located 5.4 kilometers from the starting point of the line at Sukaguchi.

== Station layout ==
The station has two opposing side platforms connected by a footbridge. The platforms are not even: the platform serving trains in the direction of Nagoya is longer, and can accommodate trains of eight carriages in length, whereas the opposing platform is shorter, and can accommodate trains of only up to six carriages. The station is staffed.

=== Platforms ===
1	■ Tsushima Line	for Tsushima, Saya, and Yatomi
2	■ Tsushima Line	for Sukaguchi, Meitetsu-Nagoya, Higashi-Okazaki, and Ōtagawa

== Adjacent stations ==
«	Service	»
Nagoya Railroad
Meitetsu Tsushima Line
Jimokuji	Limited Express (特急)	Shobata
Jimokuji	Express (急行)	Shobata
Jimokuji	Semi Express (準急)	Shobata
Shippō	Local (普通)	Aotsuka

== Station history ==
Kida Station was opened on January 23, 1914. The platforms were lengthened in 1980, and an overpass was constructed in 1981. A new station building was completed in 2018.

== Surrounding area ==
- Miwa High School
- Miwa Junior High School
- Miwa Elementary School

== See also ==
- List of railway stations in Japan
