= Shippō Station =

Railway station in Ama, Aichi Prefecture, Japan

Shippō Station 七宝駅

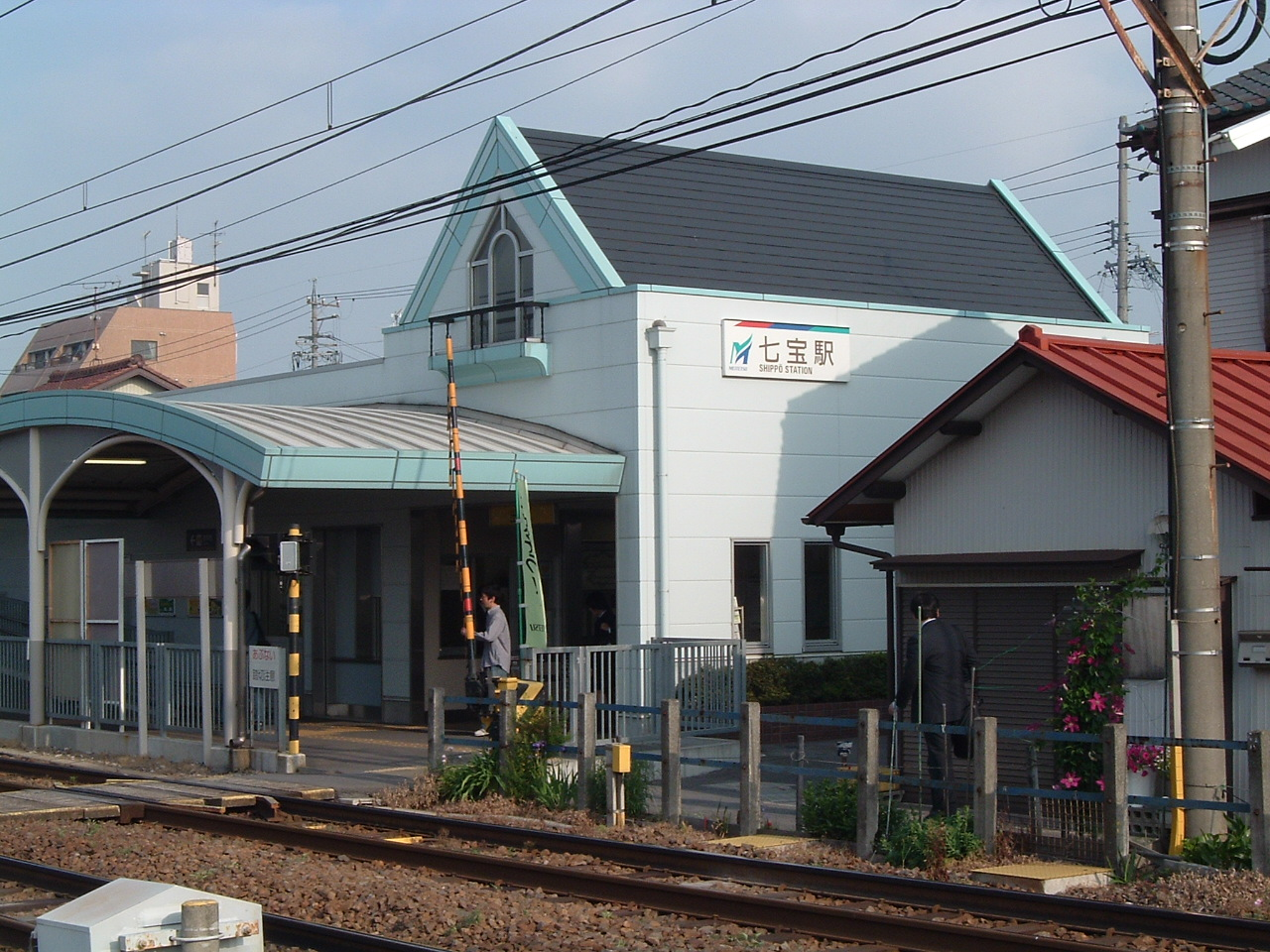
- Shippō Station in 2005

General information
- Location: Henjōchi-82-1 Shippōchō Okinoshima, Ama-shi, Aichi-ken 497-000; Japan
- Coordinates: 35.1955°N 136.8062°E
- Operator: Meitetsu
- Line: ■ Tsushima Line
- Distance: 3.7 kilometers from Sukaguchi
- Platforms: 2 side platforms

Other information
- Status: Unstaffed
- Station code: TB02
- Website: Official website

History
- Opened: January 23, 1914

Passengers
- FY2013: 4,499 daily
Location
- Location within Aichi Prefecture Location within Japan

Shippō Station (七宝駅, Shippō-eki) is a railway station in the city of Ama, Aichi Prefecture, Japan, operated by Meitetsu.

== Lines ==
Shippō Station is served by the Meitetsu Tsushima Line, and is located 3.7 kilometers from the starting point of the line at Sukaguchi.

== Station layout ==
The station has a two opposed side platforms connected by a level crossing. The platforms are not even: the platform for trains in the direction of Nagoya is longer, and can accommodate trains of eight carriages in length, whereas the opposing platform is shorter, and can accommodate trains of only up to six carriages. The station is unattended.

=== Platforms ===
1	■ Tsushima Line	for Tsushima, Saya, and Yatomi
2	■ Tsushima Line	for Sukaguchi, Meitetsu-Nagoya, Higashi-Okazaki, and Ōtagawa

== Adjacent stations ==
«	Service	»
Nagoya Railroad
Meitetsu Tsushima Line
Limited Express (特急): Does not stop at this station
Express (急行): Does not stop at this station
Semi Express (準急): Does not stop at this station
Jimokuji	Local (普通)	Kida

== Station history ==
Shippō Station was opened on January 23, 1914.

== Surrounding area ==
- Shippō Art Village (25 minute walk)
- Shippō Kita Junior High School

== See also ==
- List of railway stations in Japan
