= Jimokuji Station =

Railway station in Ama, Aichi Prefecture, Japan

Jimokuji Station 甚目寺駅

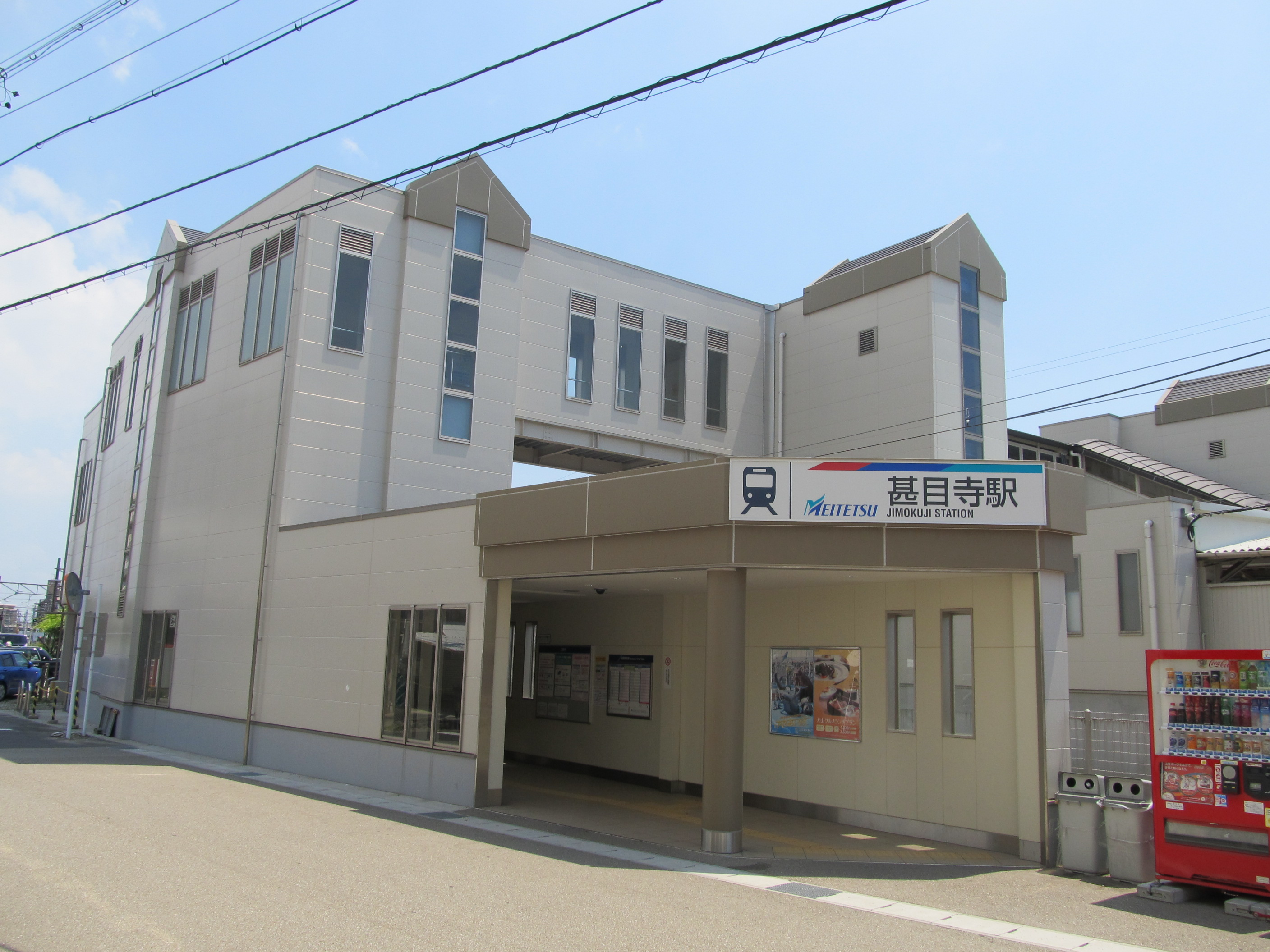
- Jimokuji Station in August 2012

General information
- Location: Gōura-35 Jimokuji, Ama-shi, Aichi-ken 490-1111; Japan
- Coordinates: 35.1961°N 136.8253°E
- Operator: Meitetsu
- Line: ■ Tsushima Line
- Distance: 2.0 kilometers from Sukaguchi
- Platforms: 2 side platforms

Other information
- Status: Staffed
- Station code: TB01
- Website: Official website

History
- Opened: January 23, 1914

Passengers
- FY2013: 9,529 daily
Location
- Location within Aichi Prefecture Location within Japan

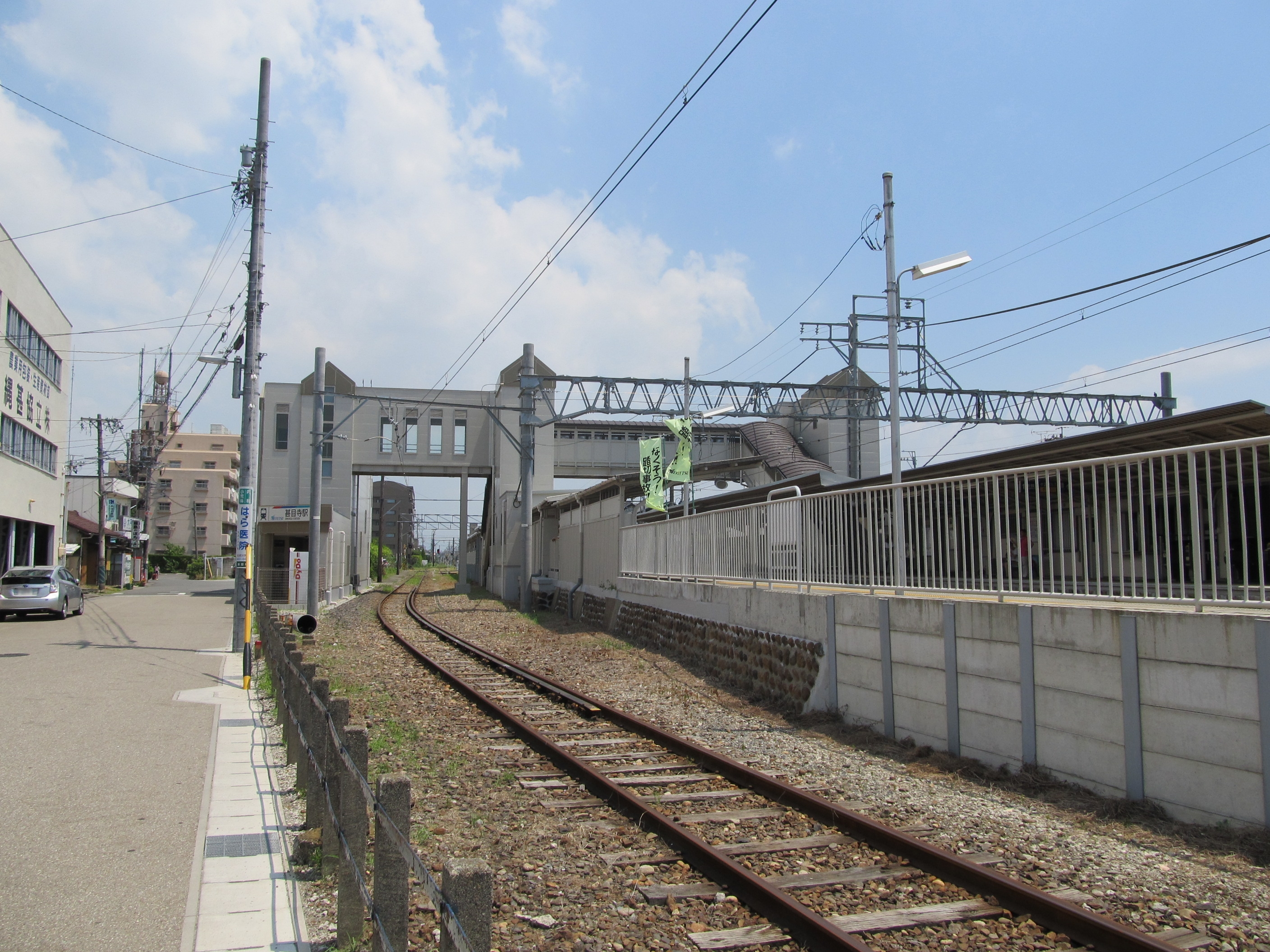
Platforms

Jimokuji Station (甚目寺駅, Jimokuji-eki) is a railway station in the city of Ama, Aichi Prefecture, Japan, operated by Meitetsu.

== Lines ==
Jimokuji Station is served by the Meitetsu Tsushima Line, and is located 2.0 kilometers from the starting point of the line at Sukaguchi.

== Station layout ==
The station has a two opposed side platforms connected by a footbridge. The platforms are not even: the platform for trains in the direction of Nagoya is longer, and can accommodate trains of eight carriages in length, whereas the opposing platform is shorter, and can accommodate trains of only up to six carriages. The station is staffed.

=== Platforms ===
1	■ Tsushima Line	for Tsushima, Saya, and Yatomi
2	■ Tsushima Line	for Sukaguchi, Meitetsu-Nagoya, Higashi-Okazaki, and Ōtagawa

== Adjacent stations ==
«	Service	»
Nagoya Railroad
Meitetsu Tsushima Line
Sukaguchi	Limited Express (特急)	Kida
Sukaguchi	Express (急行)	Kida
Sukaguchi	Semi Express (準急)	Kida
Sukaguchi	Local (普通)	Shippō

== Station history ==
Jimokuji Station was opened on January 23, 1914.

== Surrounding area ==
- Jimoku-ji
- former Jimokuji town hall

== See also ==
- List of railway stations in Japan
