= Fujinami Station (Aichi) =

Railway station in Aisai, Aichi Prefecture, Japan

Fujinami Station 藤浪駅

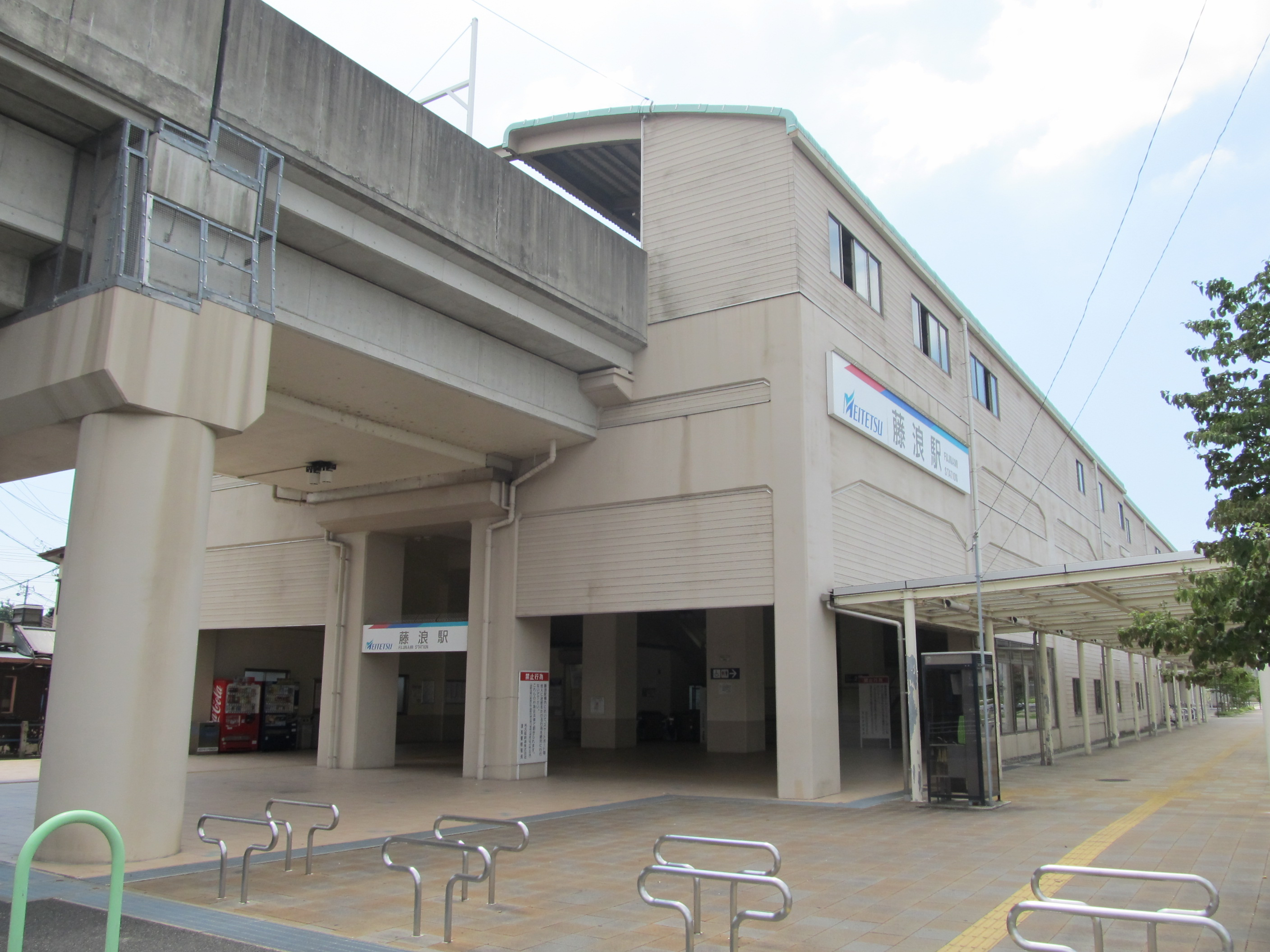
- Elevated station building, August 2012

General information
- Location: Suwa-chō Nakajima 367, Aisai-shi, Aichi-ken; Japan
- Coordinates: 35°11′20″N 136°44′20″E
- Operator: Meitetsu
- Line: ■ Tsushima Line
- Distance: 10.2 kilometers from Sukaguchi
- Platforms: 2 side platforms

Other information
- Status: Unstaffed
- Station code: TB06
- Website: Official website

History
- Opened: January 23, 1914

Passengers
- FY2017: 2,947 daily
Location
- Location within Aichi Prefecture Location within Japan

Fujinami Station (藤浪駅, Fujinami-eki) is a railway station in the city of Aisai, Aichi Prefecture, Japan, operated by Meitetsu.

== Lines ==
Fujinami Station is served by the Meitetsu Tsushima Line, and is located 10.2 kilometers from the starting point of the line at Sukaguchi.

== Station layout ==
The station has two elevated opposed side platforms, with the station building located underneath. The station is normally unattended.

=== Platforms ===
| 1 | ■ Tsushima Line | for Tsushima, Saya, and Yatomi |
| 2 | ■ Tsushima Line | for Sukaguchi, Meitetsu-Nagoya, Higashi-Okazaki, and Ōtagawa |

== Adjacent stations ==
| « | Service | » |
Meitetsu Tsushima Line
Limited Express (特急): Does not stop at this station
Express (急行): Does not stop at this station
Semi Express (準急): Does not stop at this station
| Shobata | Local (普通) | Tsushima |

== Station history ==
Fujinami Station was opened on January 23, 1914. The tracks were elevated in July 2002, and the new (and unattended) station building was completed at that time.

== Passenger statistics ==
In fiscal 2017, the station was used by an average of 2,947 passengers daily (boarding passengers only).

== Surrounding area ==
- Saori Junior High School
- Seirinkan High School

== See also ==
- List of railway stations in Japan
