= Shobata Station =

Railway station in Aisai, Aichi Prefecture, Japan

Shobata Station 勝幡駅

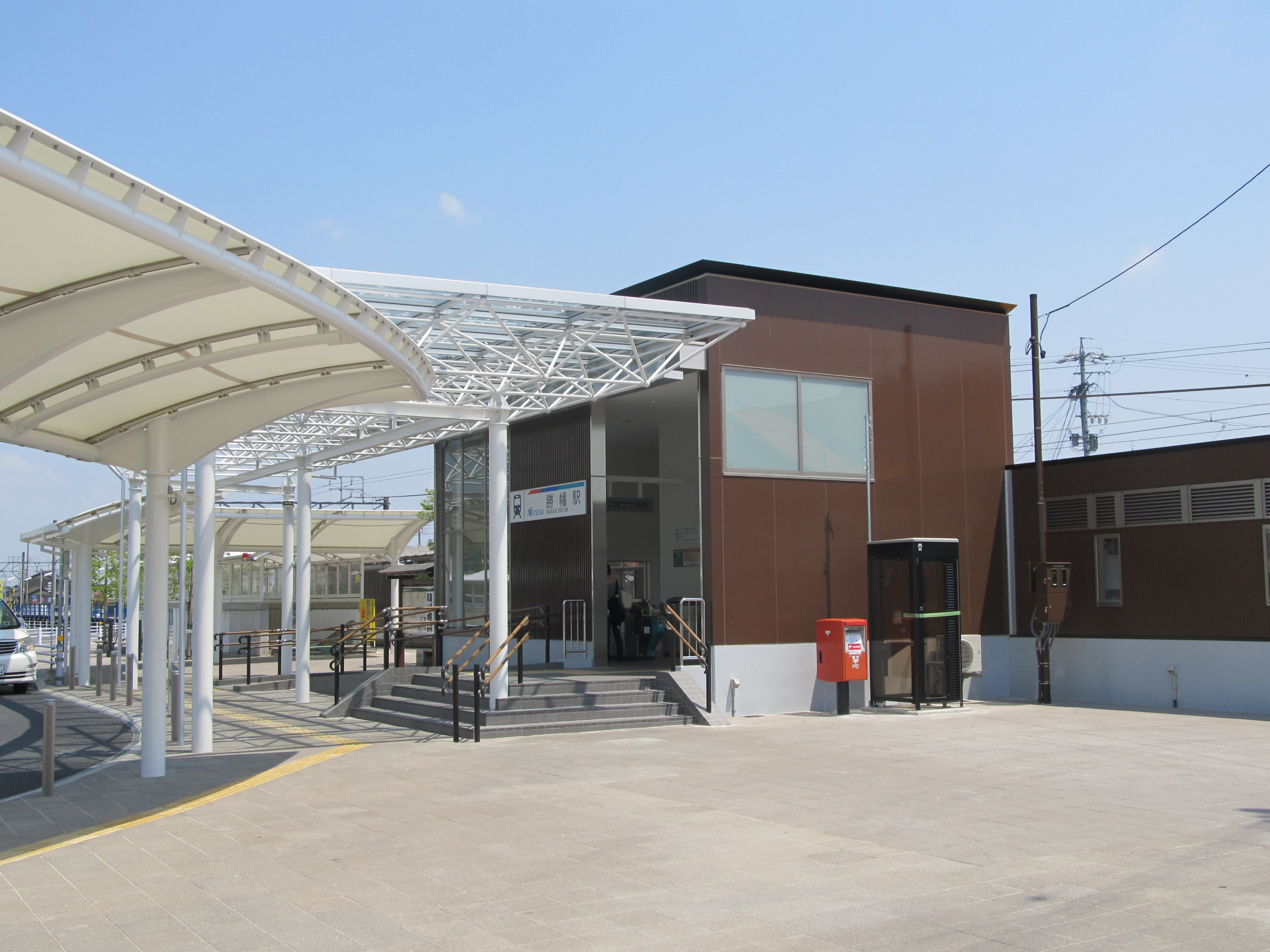
- North side of the station, April 2014

General information
- Location: Gohyōiri-2266 Shobata-chō, Aisai-shi, Aichi-ken 496-8001; Japan
- Coordinates: 35.1953°N 136.7500°E
- Operator: Meitetsu
- Line: ■ Tsushima Line
- Distance: 9.0 kilometers from Sukaguchi
- Platforms: 2 side platforms

Other information
- Status: Unstaffed
- Station code: TB05
- Website: Official website

History
- Opened: January 23, 1914

Passengers
- FY2017: 4,523 daily
Location
- Location within Aichi Prefecture Location within Japan

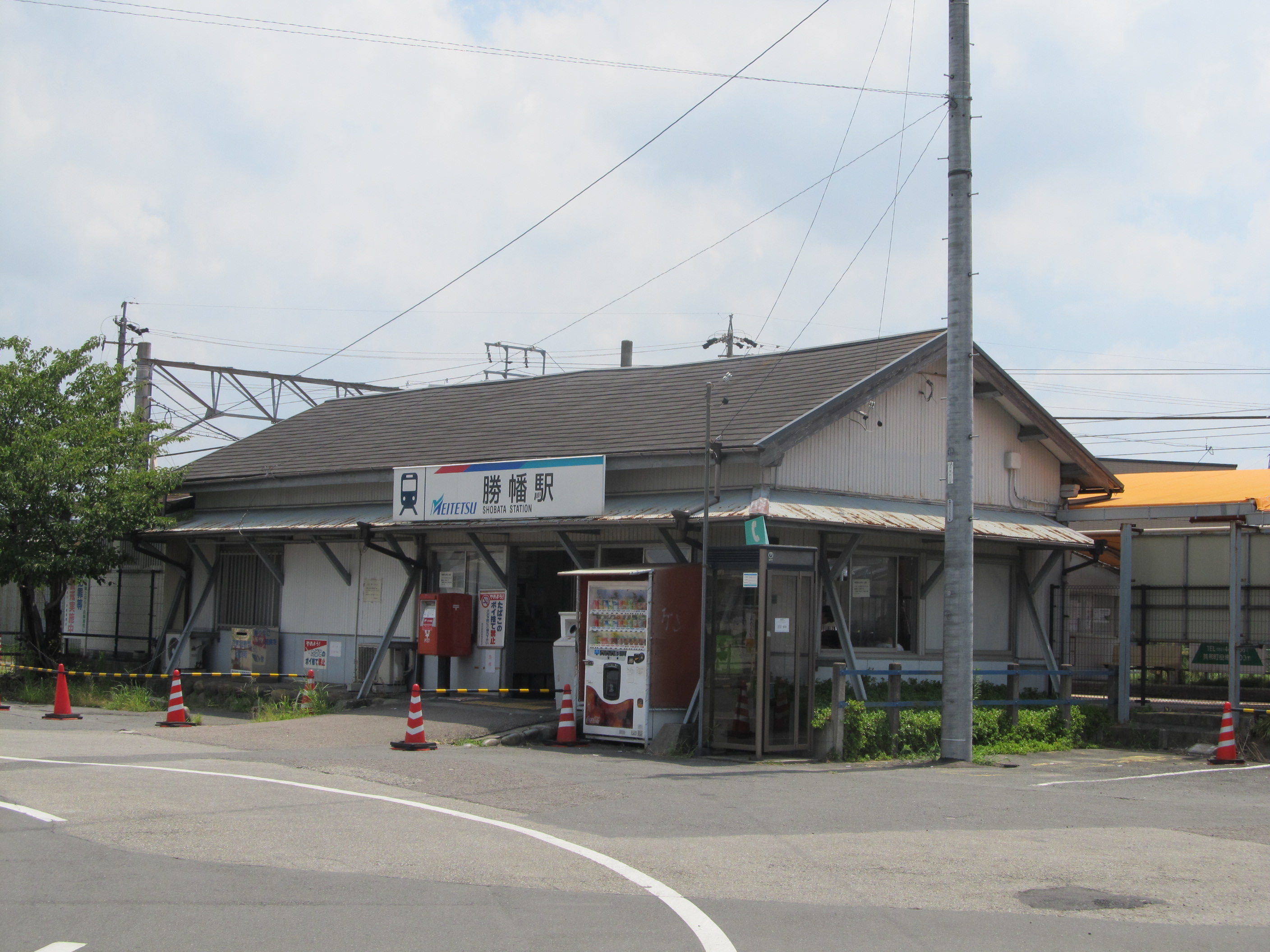
Former station building, August 2012

Shobata Station (勝幡駅, Shobata-eki) is a railway station in the city of Aisai, Aichi Prefecture, Japan, operated by Meitetsu.

== Lines ==
Shobata Station is served by the Meitetsu Tsushima Line, and is located 9.0 kilometers from the starting point of the line at Sukaguchi.

== Station layout ==
The station has two opposed side platforms, connected by an overpass. The platforms are not even: the platform for trains in the direction of Nagoya is longer, and can accommodate trains of eight carriages in length, whereas the opposing platform is shorter, and can accommodate trains of only up to six carriages.

=== Platforms ===
| 1 | ■ Tsushima Line | for Tsushima, Saya, and Yatomi |
| 2 | ■ Tsushima Line | for Sukaguchi, Meitetsu-Nagoya, Higashi-Okazaki, and Ōtagawa |

== Adjacent stations ==
| « | Service | » |
Meitetsu Tsushima Line
| Kida | Limited Express (特急) | Tsushima |
| Kida | Express (急行) | Tsushima |
| Kida | Semi Express (準急) | Tsushima |
| Aotsuka | Local (普通) | Fujinami |

== Station history ==
Shobata Station was opened on January 23, 1914.

== Passenger statistics ==
In fiscal 2017, the station was used by an average of 4,523 passengers daily (boarding passengers only).

== Surrounding area ==
- Shobata Elementary School
- Shobata Castle ruins

== See also ==
- List of railway stations in Japan
