= Aotsuka Station =

Railway station in Tsushima, Aichi Prefecture, Japan

Aotsuka Station 青塚駅

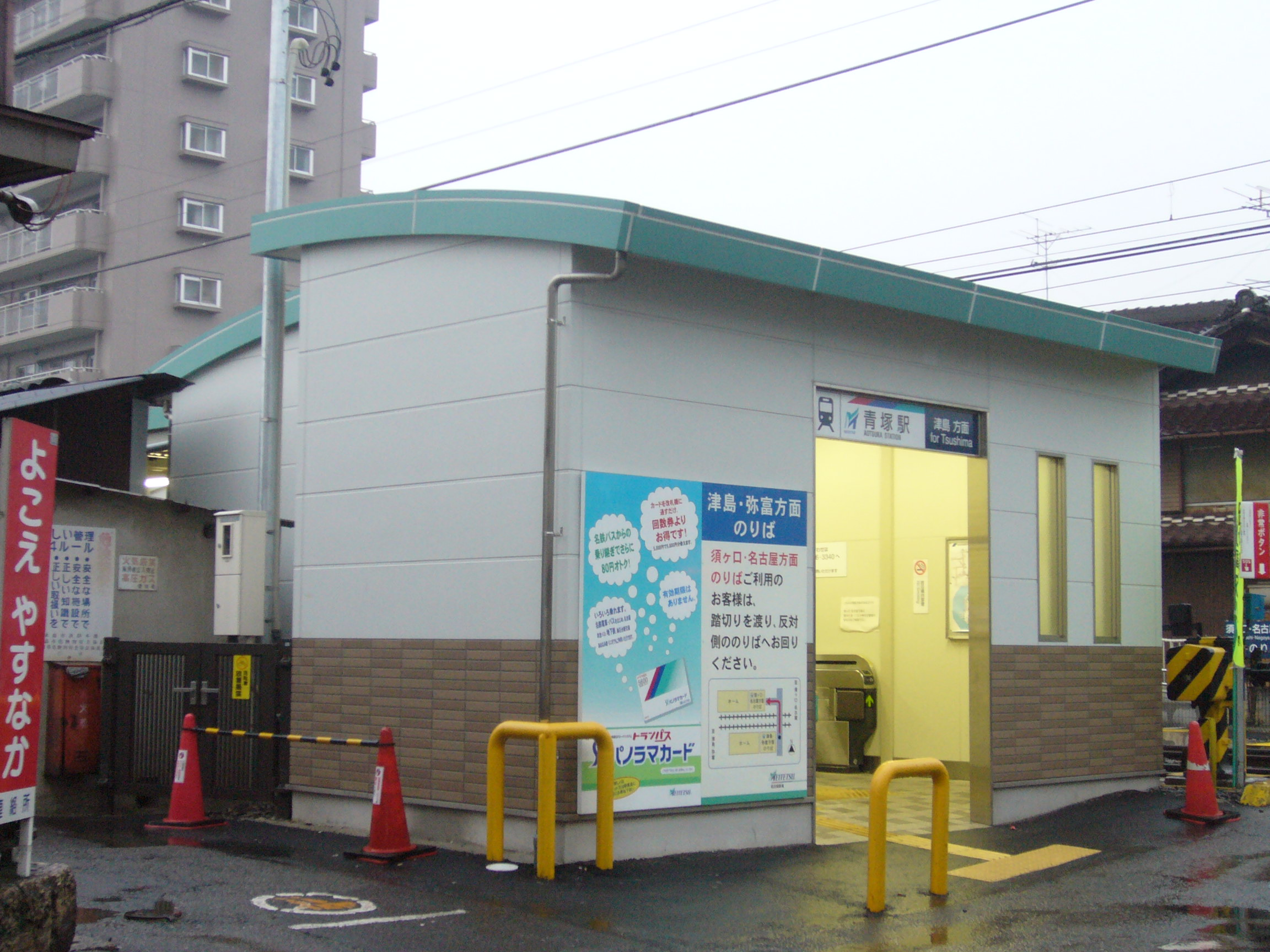
- Aotsuka Station in April 2006

General information
- Location: 1-90 Aotsukachō, Tsushima-shi, Aichi-ken 496-0001; Japan
- Coordinates: 35.1987°N 136.7669°E
- Operator: Meitetsu
- Line: ■ Tsushima Line
- Distance: 7.3 kilometers from Sukaguchi
- Platforms: 2 side platforms

Other information
- Status: Staffed
- Station code: TB04
- Website: Official website

History
- Opened: January 23, 1914

Passengers
- FY2017: 1861 daily
Location
- Location within Aichi Prefecture Location within Japan

Aotsuka Station (青塚駅, Aotsuka-eki) is a railway station in the city of Tsushima, Aichi Prefecture, Japan, operated by Meitetsu.

== Lines ==
Aotsuka Station is served by the Meitetsu Tsushima Line, and is located 7.3 kilometers from the starting point of the line at Sukaguchi.

== Station layout ==
The station has a two opposed side platforms connected by a footbridge. The platforms are not even: the platform for trains in the direction of Nagoya is longer, and can accommodate trains of eight carriages in length, whereas the opposing platform is shorter, and can accommodate trains of only up to six carriages. The station is staffed.

=== Platforms ===
| 1 | ■ Tsushima Line | for Tsushima |
| 2 | ■ Tsushima Line | for Sukaguchi and Meitetsu-Nagoya |

== Adjacent stations ==
| « | Service | » |
Nagoya Railroad
Meitetsu Tsushima Line
Limited Express (特急): Does not stop at this station
Express (急行): Does not stop at this station
Semi Express (準急): Does not stop at this station
| Kida | Local (普通) | Shobata |

== Station history ==
Aotsuka Station was opened on January 23, 1914. The station building was rebuilt in 2005.

== Passenger statistics ==
In fiscal 2017, the station was used by an average of 1861 passengers daily.

== Surrounding area ==
- site of Nishi-Mizoguchi Castle

== See also ==
- List of railway stations in Japan
