= Meitetsu Tsushima Line =

Railway line in Aichi Prefecture, Japan

Tsushima Line

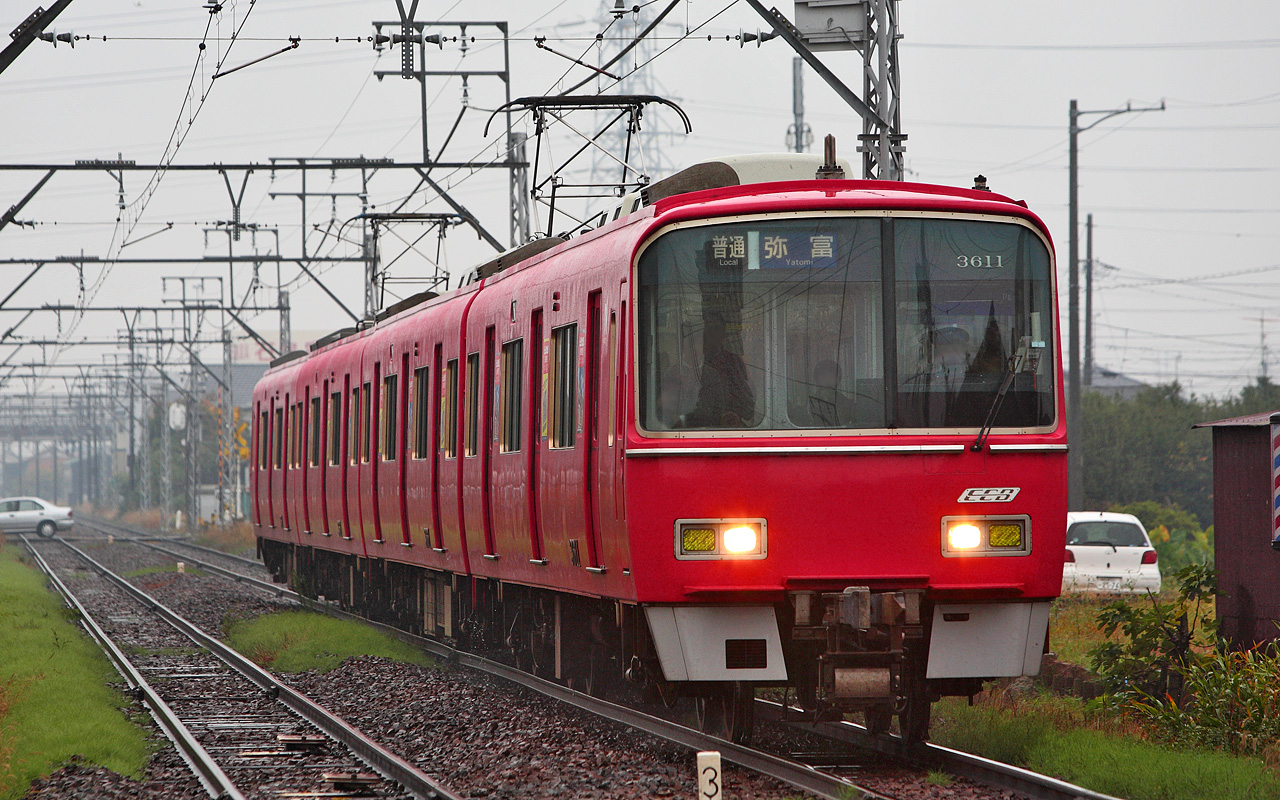
- A Meitetsu 3500 series EMU

Overview
- Native name: 津島線
- Status: In service
- Owner: Nagoya Railroad Co., Ltd.
- Locale: Aichi Prefecture
- Termini: Sukaguchi; Tsushima
- Stations: 8

Service
- Type: Commuter rail
- System: Meitetsu
- Route number: TB
- Operator(s): Nagoya Railroad Co., Ltd.
- Daily ridership: 17,352 (2008)

History
- Opened: 1914; 112 years ago

Technical
- Line length: 11.8 km (7.33 mi)
- Track gauge: 1,067 mm (3 ft 6 in)
- Electrification: 1,500 V DC, overhead catenary
- Operating speed: 105 km/h (65 mph)

The Tsushima Line (津島線, Tsushima-sen) is an 11.8 km (7.33 mi) Japanese railway line which connects Sukaguchi Station in Kiyosu, Aichi with Tsushima Station in Tsushima, Aichi. It is owned and operated by the private railway operator Nagoya Railroad (Meitetsu). Manaca is accepted at all stations.

== Overview ==
The line opened as dual track interurban operated by the Nagoya Electric Railway which is the predecessor of the Nagoya Railway. It is a commuting route to Tsushima City along the Tsushima Road. Due to the line running through low lying wetland areas, it has been damaged many times by typhoons and sudden downpours.

== Operations ==
There are only a few trains that strictly run confined to the Tsushima line. Most trains provide through service into the Meitetsu Bisai Line bound for Saya Station and more than half the trains through service into the Nagoya Main Line.

In addition, since the regular train of Gifu direction is required to depart from the station in the Nagoya Main Line, Biwajima Branch Point of the Nagoya Main Line-each station stop between the required mouth is still the Tsushima Line direct train is responsible.

=== Departure time of the day at the Sukaguchi station ===
Time	Type	Go End
5	Local	Yatomi
22	Local	Saya
35	Local	Yatomi
52	Local	Saya

==== Departure time of the day at the Tsushima station ====
Time	Type	Go End	other
2	Local	Sukaguchi	
17	Local	Kira-Yoshida	Semi-Express from Sukaguchi Express from Nagoya
32	Local	Sukaguchi	
47	Local	Kira-Yoshida	Semi-Express from Sukaguchi Express from Nagoya

===== ■Limited express =====
This system was established in December 2008 for the convenience of home use in the direction of Tsushima. It is a limited express seat all cars. It is the one that the express of Kowa Line was renewed to the form to extend driving to the Bisai line Saya station only on weekdays evening.

It was set at 18 o'clock in the evening on weekdays-21 o'clock in one hour of the unit, initially Kowa station was originally set, but since the revised in March 2011, Utsumi Station is the first train.

==== ■Express ====
In December 2008, the Rapid Express (before the revised January 2005 Express) was operated as a direct system of Nishio line has been changed to local Express, the operation of the Tsushima Line as an express is only one morning down the weekday, and two up at night.

In this line, for six-car home except for the first-order station and Tsushima station, Nagoya-2 both do the door cut.

==== ■Semi Express ====
It is set up in the time zone from morning to evening of weekday evening rush time and Saturday holiday, Bisai line Saya Station-Nishio Line Kira Yoshida Station has two hourly runs (from Meitetsu Nagoya Station to express, part time zone is local express within Nishio line). Because the descending train of the same system becomes usual from the station to which it is required, there is no descending train which runs by local Express in the Tsushima line. In the past, it was operated on weekdays as well as on Saturdays and weekends, but since the Toyoake station system was reduced due to the March 2011 amendment, the system was replaced by the Jingumae station (descending.

Meitetsu Nagoya Station)-Yatomi to take the train between stations, the local express operation of the time zone was lost along with it.

==== ■Local(each stop) ====
The vertical line, the diamond to contact the express of Nagoya Main Line at the station is subject to the basic. In the current diamond is operated alternately train and Nagoya Main Line direct train between ､ station-Saya station and Yatomi station in any pattern.

As described above, the pattern of non-weekday daytime is assembled in December 2008 revision, it is the one that was changed in March 2011 revision only weekday daytime. It is operated in almost four-car train, in the morning rush up of the weekday is eight-car train, is operated at intervals of about 10 minutes, it has become a pattern to change type to express and express at the station required. Eight-car train of descent that has been set for feeding to these, except for the mouth station, Fujinami Station, Tsushima Station, for 6 both home, Nagoya Way 2 Both do the door cut.

== Stations ==
Local trains stop at all stations.

No.	Name	Japanese	Distance (km)	Semi Express	Express	Limited Express	Transfers	Location	
NH42	Sukaguchi	須ヶ口	0.0	●	●	●	Nagoya Main Line (NH42)	Kiyosu	Aichi
TB01	Jimokuji	甚目寺	2.0	●	●	●		Ama	Aichi
TB02	Shippō	七宝	3.7	｜	｜	｜		Ama	Aichi
TB03	Kida	木田	5.4	●	●	●		Ama	Aichi
TB04	Aotsuka	青塚	7.3	｜	｜	｜		Tsushima	Aichi
TB05	Shobata	勝幡	9.0	●	●	●		Aisai	Aichi
TB06	Fujinami	藤浪	10.2	｜	｜	｜		Aisai	Aichi
TB07	Tsushima	津島	11.8	●	●	●	Bisai Line (TB07)	Tsushima	Aichi
