= Hibino Station (Aisai) =

Railway station in Aisai, Aichi Prefecture, Japan

Hibino Station 日比野駅

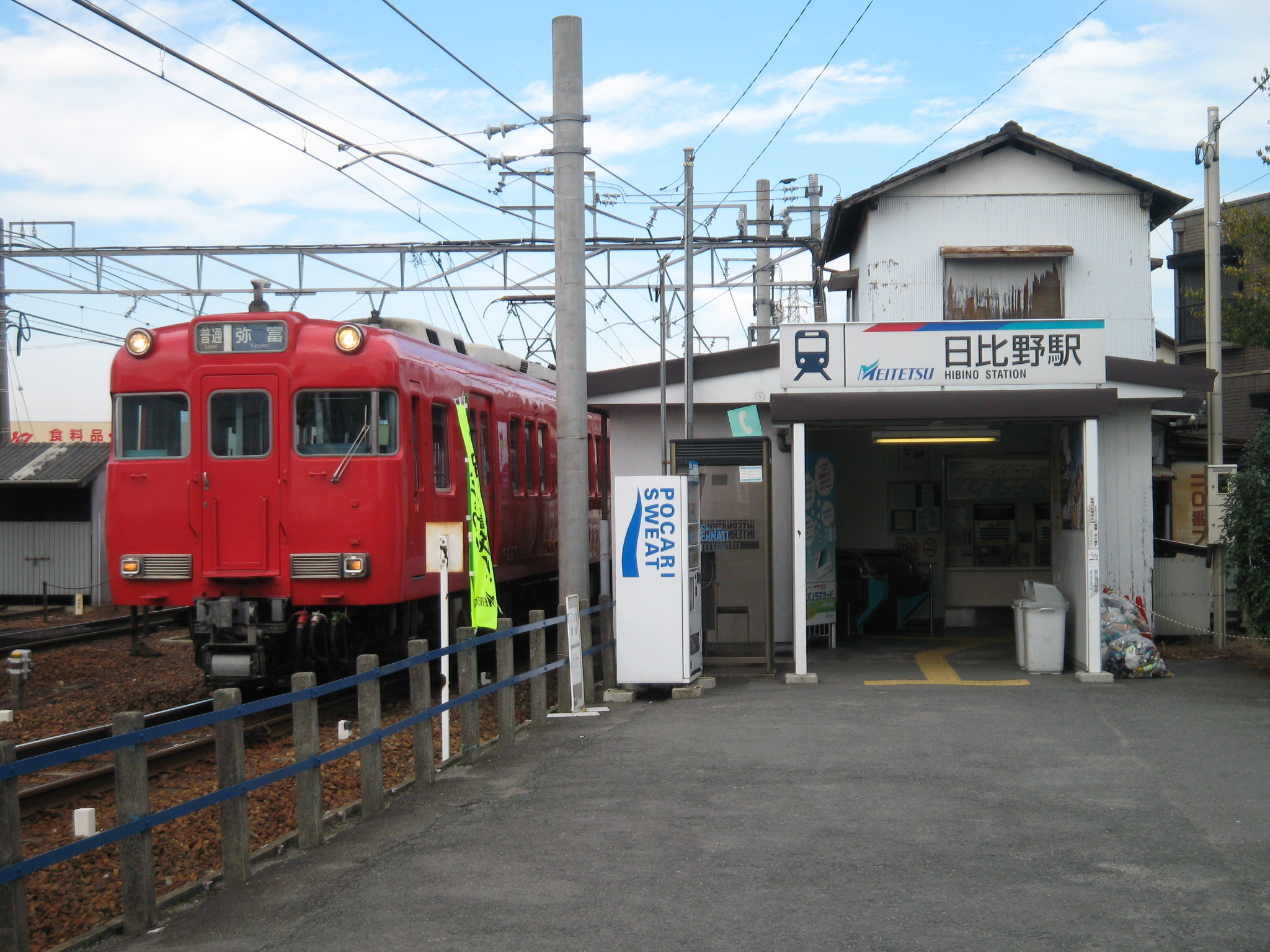
- Hibino Station in November 2007

General information
- Location: Higashidamen-793-3 Yugichō, Aisai-shi, Aichi-ken 496-0904; Japan
- Coordinates: 35.1633°N 136.728°E
- Operator: Meitetsu
- Line: ■ Bisai Line
- Distance: 6.6 kilometers from Yatomi
- Platforms: 1 island platform

Other information
- Status: Unstaffed
- Station code: TB08
- Website: Official website

History
- Opened: December 19, 1907

Passengers
- FY2017: 3,721 daily
Location
- Location within Aichi Prefecture Location within Japan

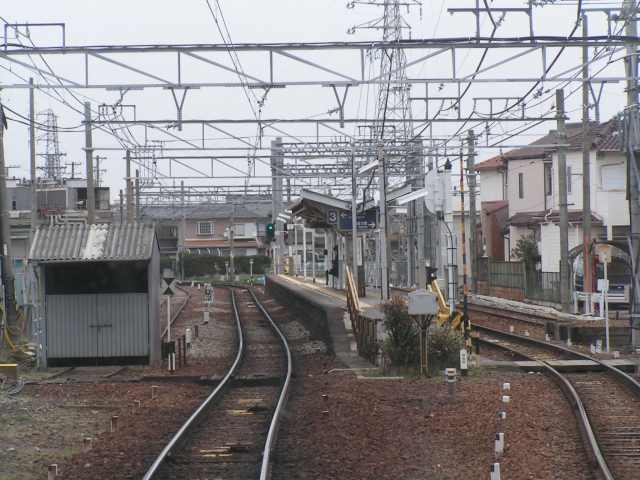
Platforms

Hibino Station (日比野駅, Hibino-eki)is a railway station in the city of Aisai, Aichi Prefecture, Japan, operated by Meitetsu.

== Lines ==
Fuchidaka Station is served by the Meitetsu Bisai Line, and is located 6.6 kilometers from the starting point of the line at Yatomi.

== Station layout ==
The station has a single island platform, connected to the station building by a level crossing. The platforms can accommodate trains of only up to six carriages. The station has automated ticket machines, Manaca automated turnstiles and is unattended.

=== Platforms ===
1	■ Bisai Line	for Saya and Yatomi
2	■ Bisai Line	for Tsushima, Sukaguchi, Meitetsu-Nagoya, Nishio, Ōtagawa, Morikami, and Meitetsu-Ichinomiya

== Adjacent stations ==
«	Service	»
Nagoya Railroad
Bisai Line
Saya	-	Tsushima

== Station history ==
Hibino Station was opened on December 19, 1907 as a station on the privately held Bisai Railroad, which was purchased by Meitetsu on August 1, 1925 becoming the Meitetsu Bisai Line. The station has been unattended since July 2005.

== Passenger statistics ==
In fiscal 2017, the station was used by an average of 3,721 passengers daily (boarding passengers only).

== Surrounding area ==
- Tsushima High School

== See also ==
- List of railway stations in Japan
