= Mitsuharu Kaneko =

Japanese poet and painter (1895–1975)

- Born: 25 December 1895; Tsushima, Aichi, Japan
- Died: 30 June 1975 (aged 79)
- Occupation: Poet

Mitsuharu Kaneko (金子 光晴, Kaneko Mitsuharu; 25 December 1895 – 30 June 1975) was a Japanese poet and painter. He was a recipient of the Yomiuri Prize.

== Biography ==
Mitsuharu Kaneko was born in Tsushima, Aichi and attended the private Catholic school Gyosei Gakuen in Tokyo. He published his first poetry collection Akatsuchi no Ie (Red Clay House) in 1919. He was known as an anti-establishment figure, and during the Second World War, he deliberately made his son ill, so he would not be drafted. As well as publishing several volumes of poetry, he was also known for his autobiographical works. In 1954, he received the 5th Yomiuri Prize.

== Selected bibliography ==
Poetry

- Kohro (The Censor), private edition, Tokyo, 1916
- Sekido no ie (The House of Red Clay), private edition, Tokyo, 1919
- Koganemushi (Japanese Beetle), Shinchosha, Tokyo, 1923
- Dai-furan shoh (Ode to Great Putrefaction), unpublished, 1923
- Mizu no ruroh (Wanderings of Water), Shinchosha, Tokyo, 1926
- Fuka shizumu (The Shark Sinks), co-authored with Mori Michiyo, Shinchosha, Tokyo, 1927
- Same (Sharks), Jinminsha, Tokyo, 1937
- Rakkasan (Parachute), Nihon mirai-ha hakkosho, Tokyo, 1948
- Ga (Moth), Hokutoshoin, Tokyo, 1948
- Onna-tachi e no eregii (Elegies to Women), Sogensha, Tokyo, 1949
- Oni no ko no uta (Songs of a Devil’s Child), Jyuhjiya Shoten, Tokyo, 1949
- Ningen no higeki (Human Tragedy), Sogensha, Tokyo, 1952
- Hijoh (Merciless), Shinchosha, Tokyo, 1955
- Collected Poems (5 volumes), Shoshi Yuriika/Shoushinsha, Tokyo, 1960–1971
- He no yoh na uta (Songs Like a Fart), Schichosha, Tokyo, 1962
- IL, Keisoshobo, Tokyo, 1965
- Wakaba no uta (Songs of Young Leaves), Keisoshobo, Tokyo, 1967
- Complete Poems, Chikumashobo, Tokyo, 1967
- Aijyo 69 (Love 69), Chikumashobo, Tokyo, 1968
- Hana to akibin (Flowers and Empty Bottles), Seigashobo, Tokyo, 1973

Essays

- Marei Ran’in Kikoh (Malay and Dutch East Indies Travelogue), 1940
- Shijin (Poet), Heibonsha, Tokyo, 1957, an autobiography
- Dokuro-hai (Skull Cup), Chuoh kohron sha, Tokyo, 1971
- Nemure pari (Go to Sleep, Paris), Chuo kohron sha, Tokyo, 1973
- Nishi higashi (West and East), Chuoh kohron sha, Tokyo, 1974

Works in English

- Opposition in 99 Poems in Translation, New York, Grove Press, 1994
