= Tsushima, Aichi =

Tsushima 津島市
- City
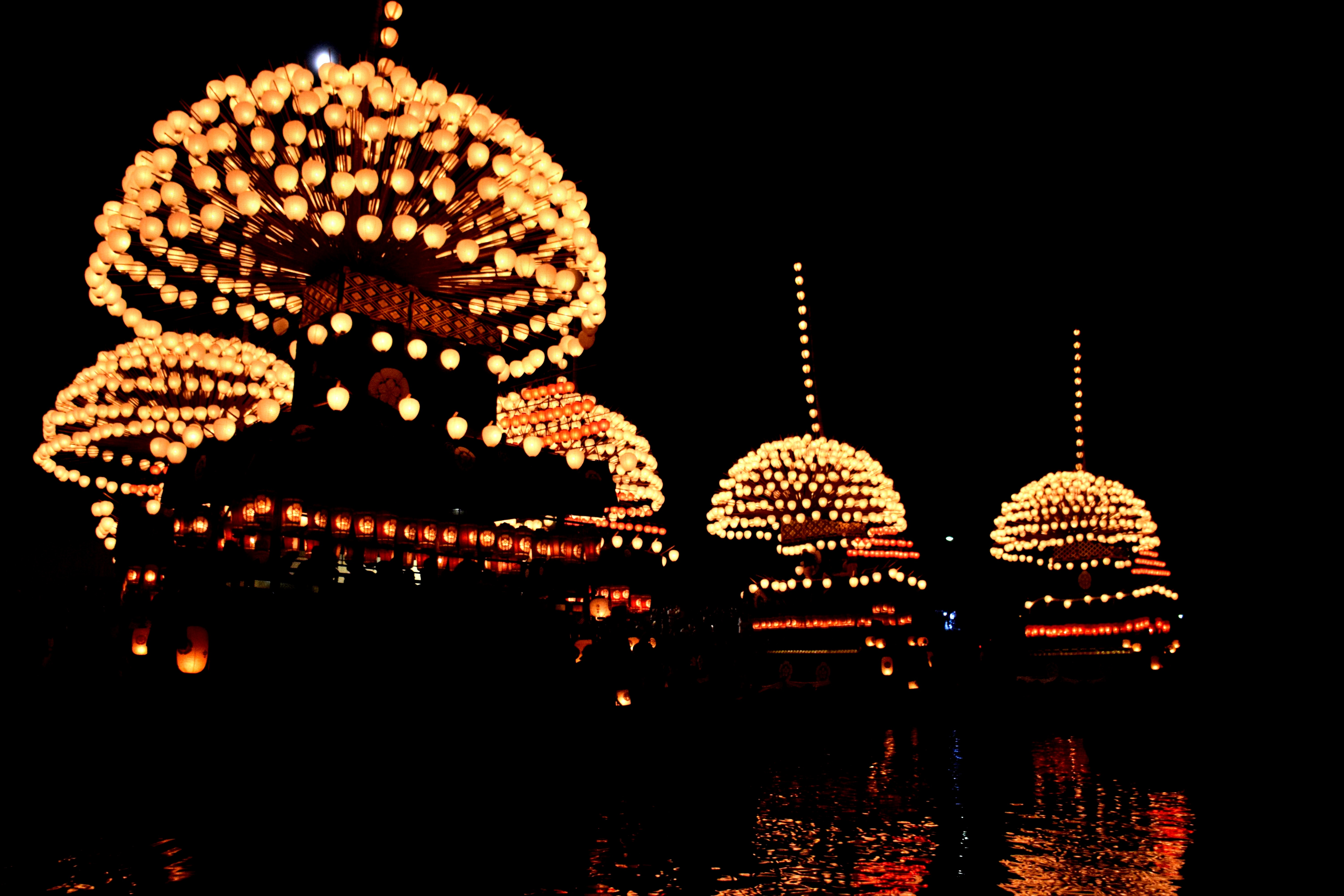
- Tsushima Tenno Festival

- Flag Emblem

- Location of Tsushima in Aichi Prefecture

- Coordinates: 35°10′37.4″N 136°44′28.6″E
- Country: Japan
- Region: Chūbu (Tōkai)
- Prefecture: Aichi

Area
  - Total: 25.09 km^{2} (9.69 sq mi)

Population (October 1, 2019)
  - Total: 61,647
  - Density: 2,457/km^{2} (6,364/sq mi)
- Time zone: UTC+9 (Japan Standard Time)
- Tree: Pinus thunbergii
- Flower: Japanese wisteria
- Bird: Egret
- Phone number: 0567-24-1111
- Address: 2-21 Tatekomi-chō, Tsushima-shi, Aichi-ken 496-8686
- Website: Official website

Tsushima (津島市, Tsushima-shi) is a city located in Aichi Prefecture in the Chūbu region of Japan. As of October 1, 2019, the city had an estimated population of 61,647 in 26,559 households, and a population density of 2,457 persons per km². The total area of the city is 25.09 square kilometres (9.69 sq mi).

== Geography ==
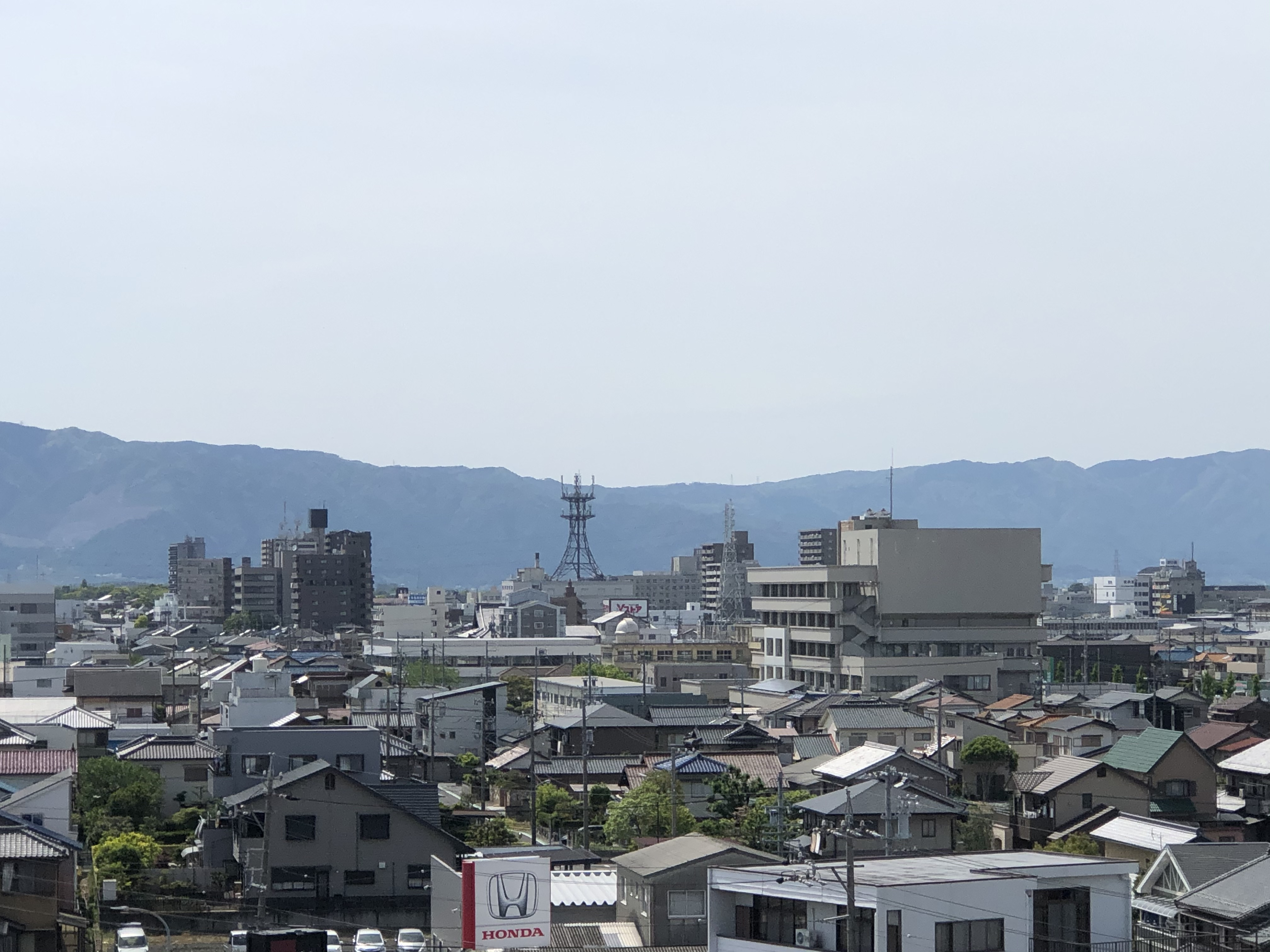
Skyline of Tsushima City

Tsushima is located in far western Aichi Prefecture, on the alluvial plain of the Kiso Three Rivers.

=== Climate ===
The city has a climate characterized by hot and humid summers, and relatively mild winters (Köppen climate classification Cfa). The average annual temperature in Tsushima is 15.6 °C. The average annual rainfall is 1710 mm with September as the wettest month. The temperatures are highest on average in August, at around 27.9 °C with occasional typhoons, and lowest in January, at around 4.4 °C with occasional snow. The East Asian rainy season occurs in June.

=== Demographics ===
Per Japanese census data, the population of Tsushima has been relatively steady over the past 30 years.

Historical population
| Year | Pop. | ±% |
|---|---|---|
| 1960 | 43,198 | — |
| 1970 | 51,441 | +19.1% |
| 1980 | 59,049 | +14.8% |
| 1990 | 59,343 | +0.5% |
| 2000 | 65,422 | +10.2% |
| 2010 | 65,237 | −0.3% |

=== Surrounding municipalities ===
Aichi Prefecture

- Aisai
- Ama
- Kanie

== History ==
=== Middle ages ===
Tsushima developed as a monzen-machi catering to the pilgrimage traffic to the well-known Shinto shrine of Tsushima Jinja from the Muromachi period.

=== Early modern period ===
During the Sengoku period, the area was controlled by the Oda clan and subsequently in the Edo period was part of the holdings of the Owari-Tokugawa family of Owari Domain.

=== Late modern period ===
During the Meiji period, the area was organized into several villages under Ama District, Aichi Prefecture, including the village of Tsushima in 1871 with the establishment of the modern municipalities system. During the Meiji period, the area was a center for textile production. Tsushima was elevated to town status on October 1, 1889, and to city status on March 1, 1947.

=== Contemporary history ===
Tsushima was hit by the Ise-Wan Typhoon in 1959 which caused widespread damage and flooding.

== Government ==
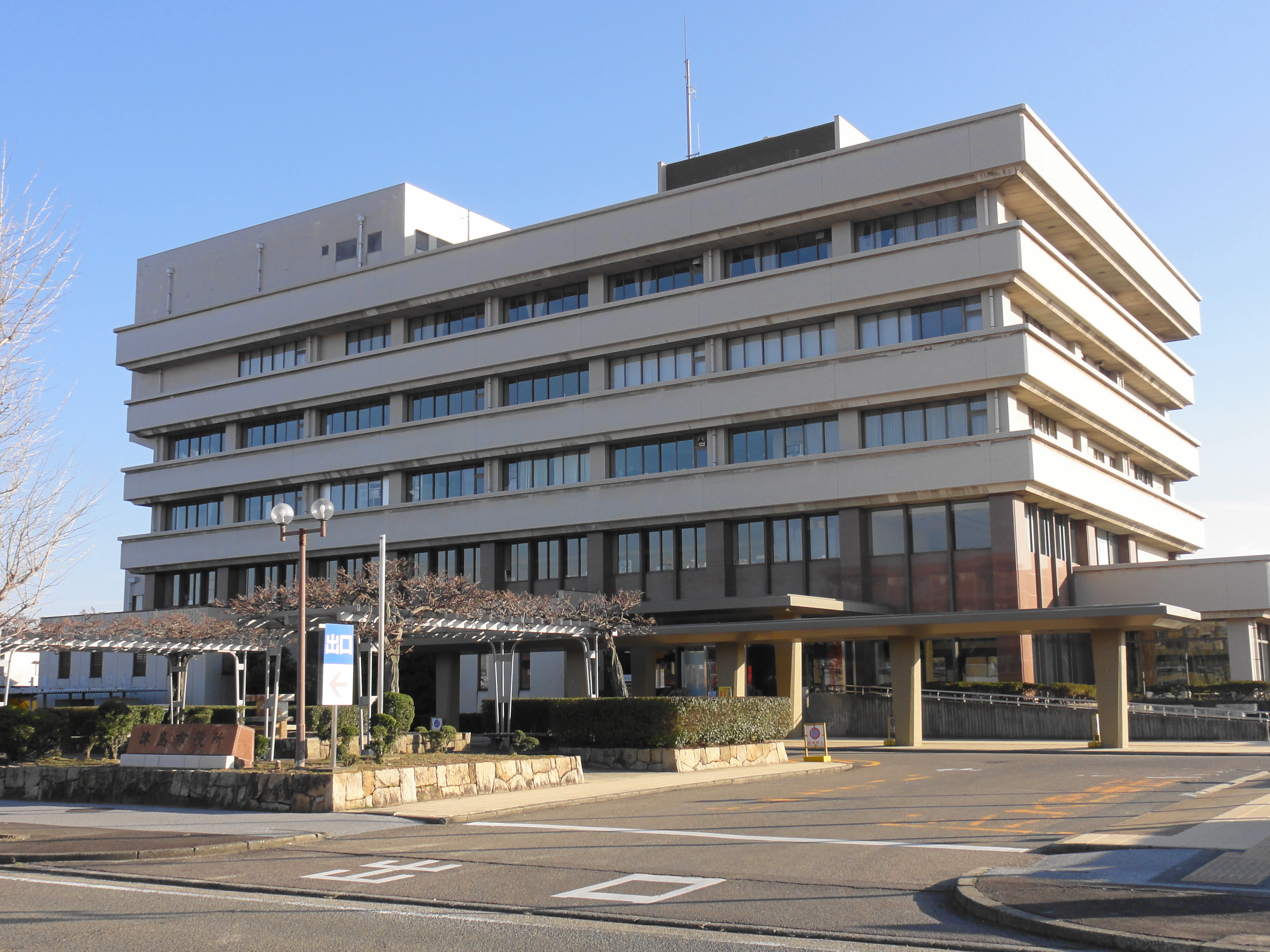
Tsushima City hall

Tsushima has a mayor-council form of government with a directly elected mayor and a unicameral city legislature of 18 members. The city contributes one member to the Aichi Prefectural Assembly. In terms of national politics, the city is part of Aichi District 9 of the lower house of the Diet of Japan.

== Sister cities ==
=== International ===
Sister cities

- Hercules, California, United States, since November 5, 1981

=== National ===
Disaster alliance city

- Fujioka, Gunma Prefecture, since September 1, 2004
- Kasukabe, Saitama Prefecture, since September 1, 2004
- Kōnan, Aichi Prefecture, since September 1, 2004

== Education ==
=== Schools ===
Tsushima has eight public elementary schools and four public junior high schools operated by the city government, and three public high schools operated by the Aichi Prefectural Board of Education. There are also one high school operated by the city government.

== Transportation ==
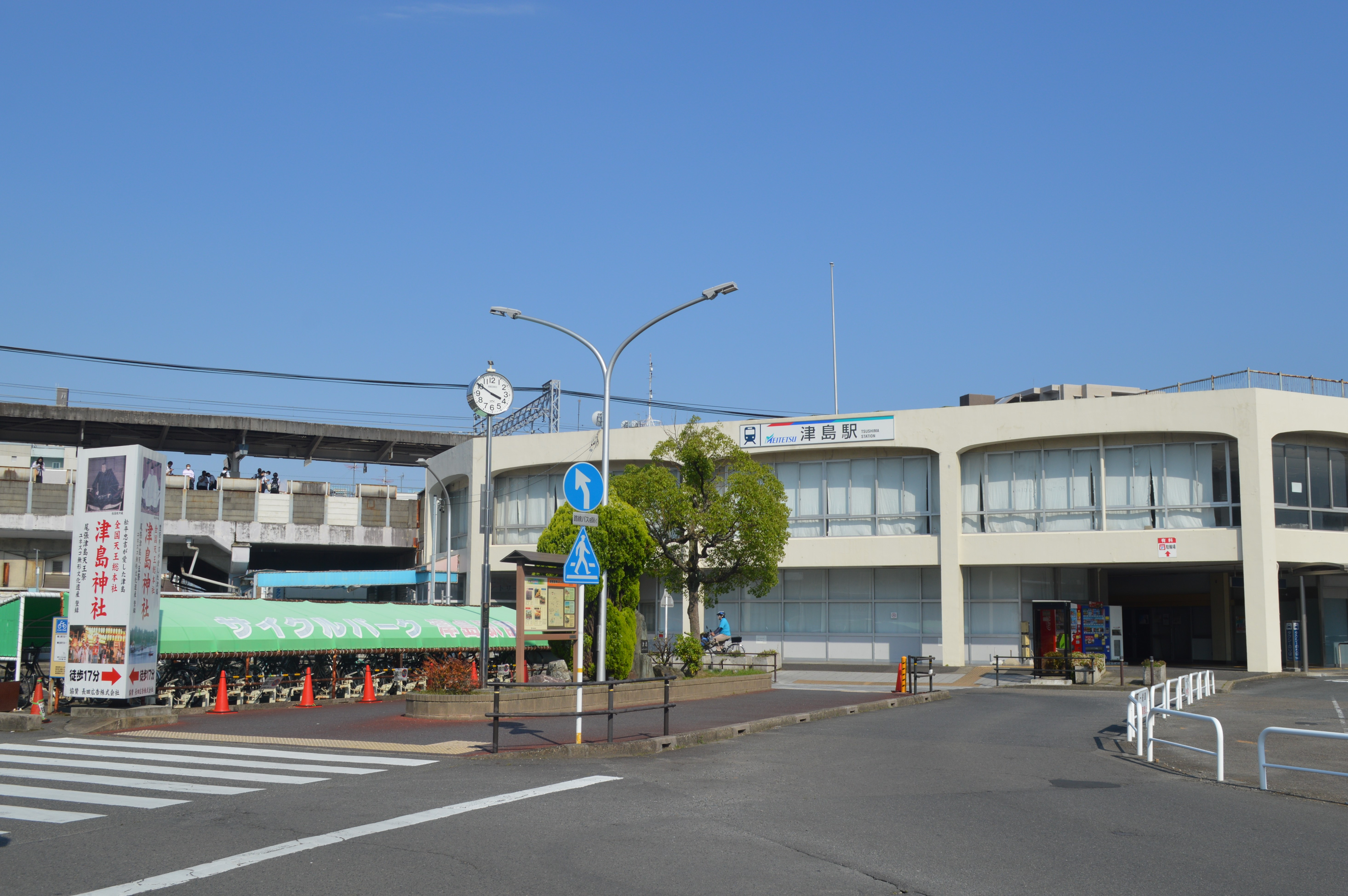
Tsushima Station

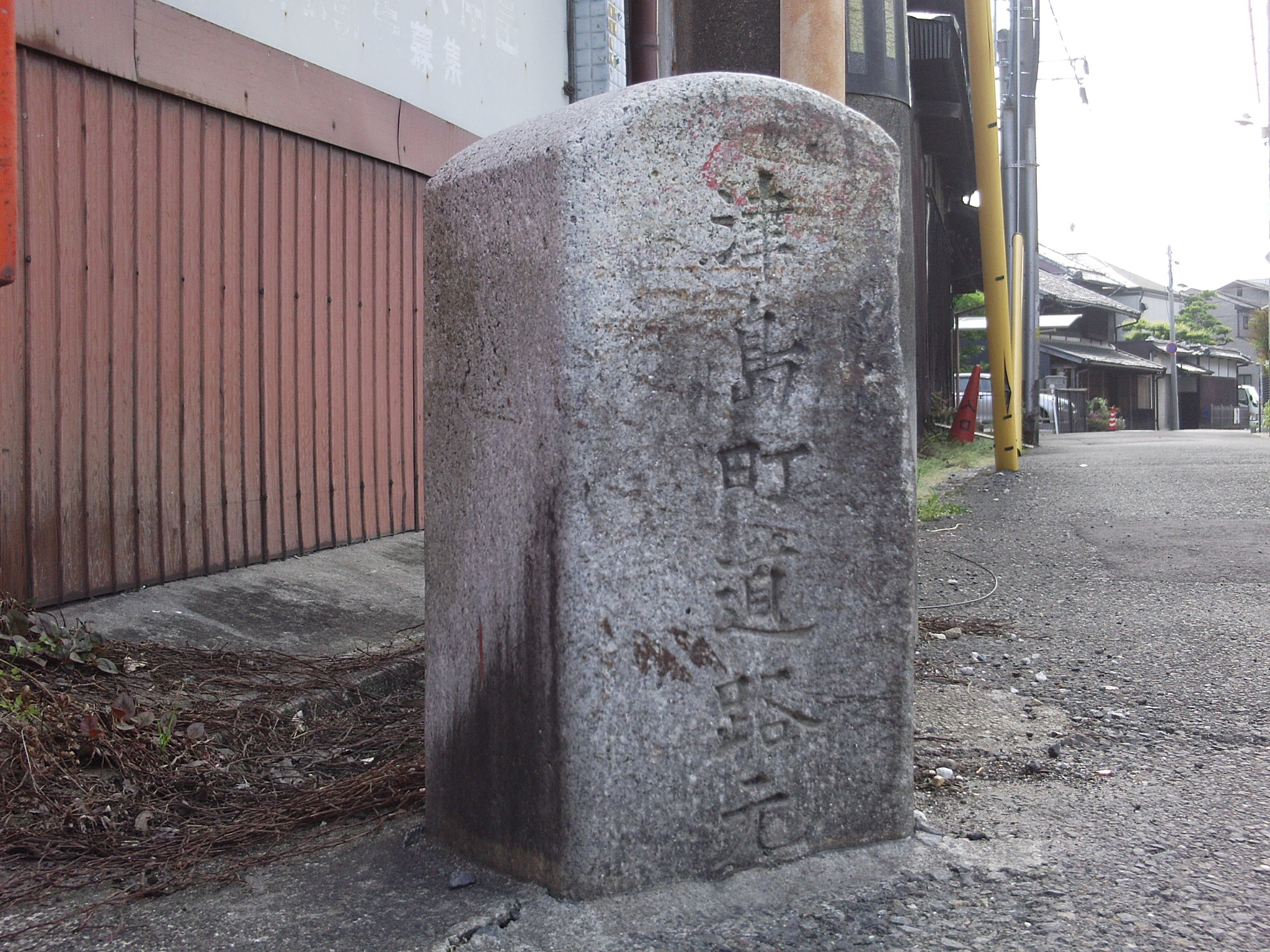
The Kilometre Zero of Tsushima

=== Railways ===
==== Conventional lines ====
Meitetsu

- Tsushima Line: - Tsushima – (Shobata) - (Fujinami) - Aotsuka -
- Bisai Line: - Tsushima -

=== Roads ===
==== Expressways ====
- Higashi-Meihan Expressway

==== Japan National Route ====
- National Route 155

== Local attractions ==
- The Japan Mosque of the Ahmadiyyas, largest mosque (by capacity) in Japan.
- Tsushima Shrine
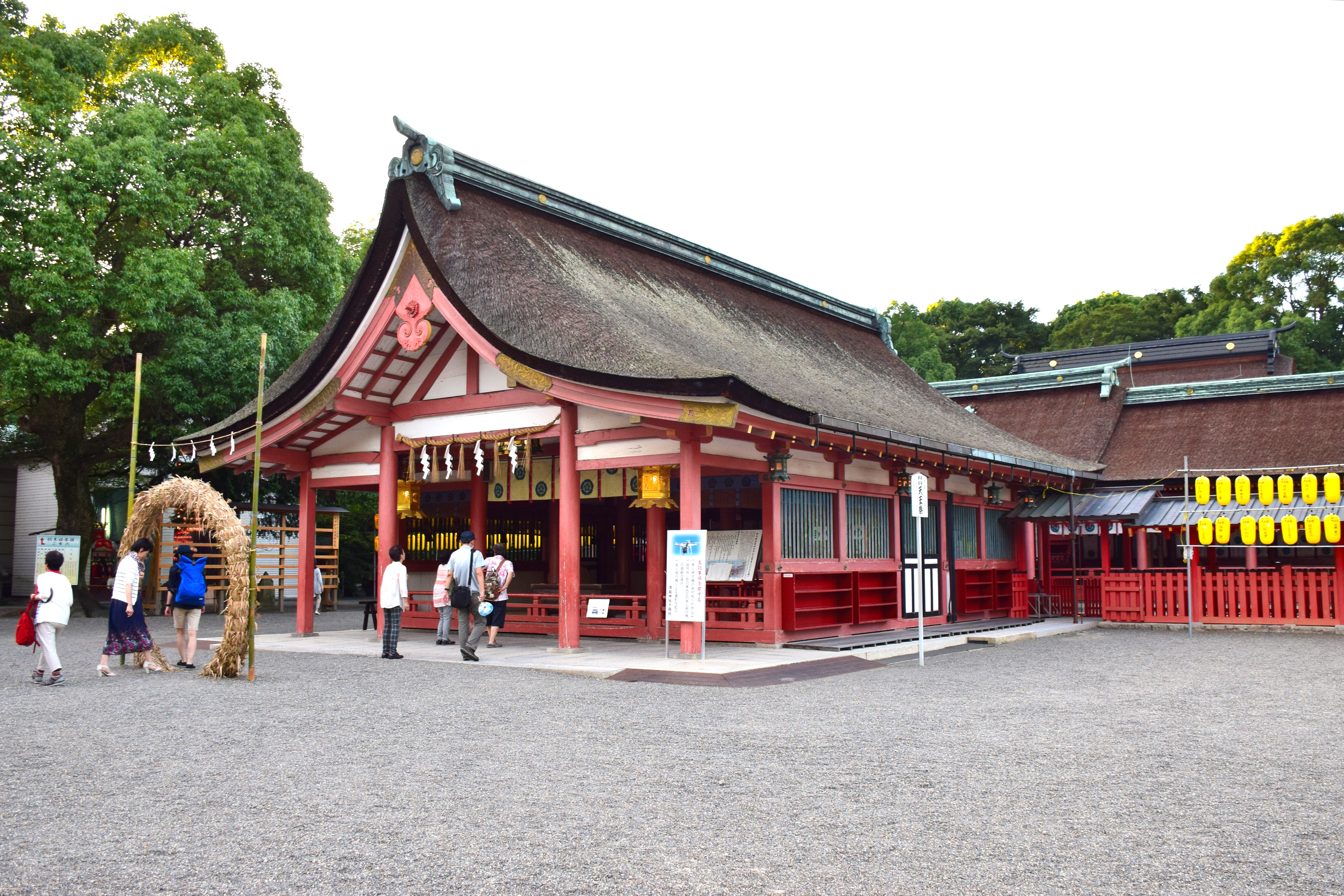
Tsushima Shrine

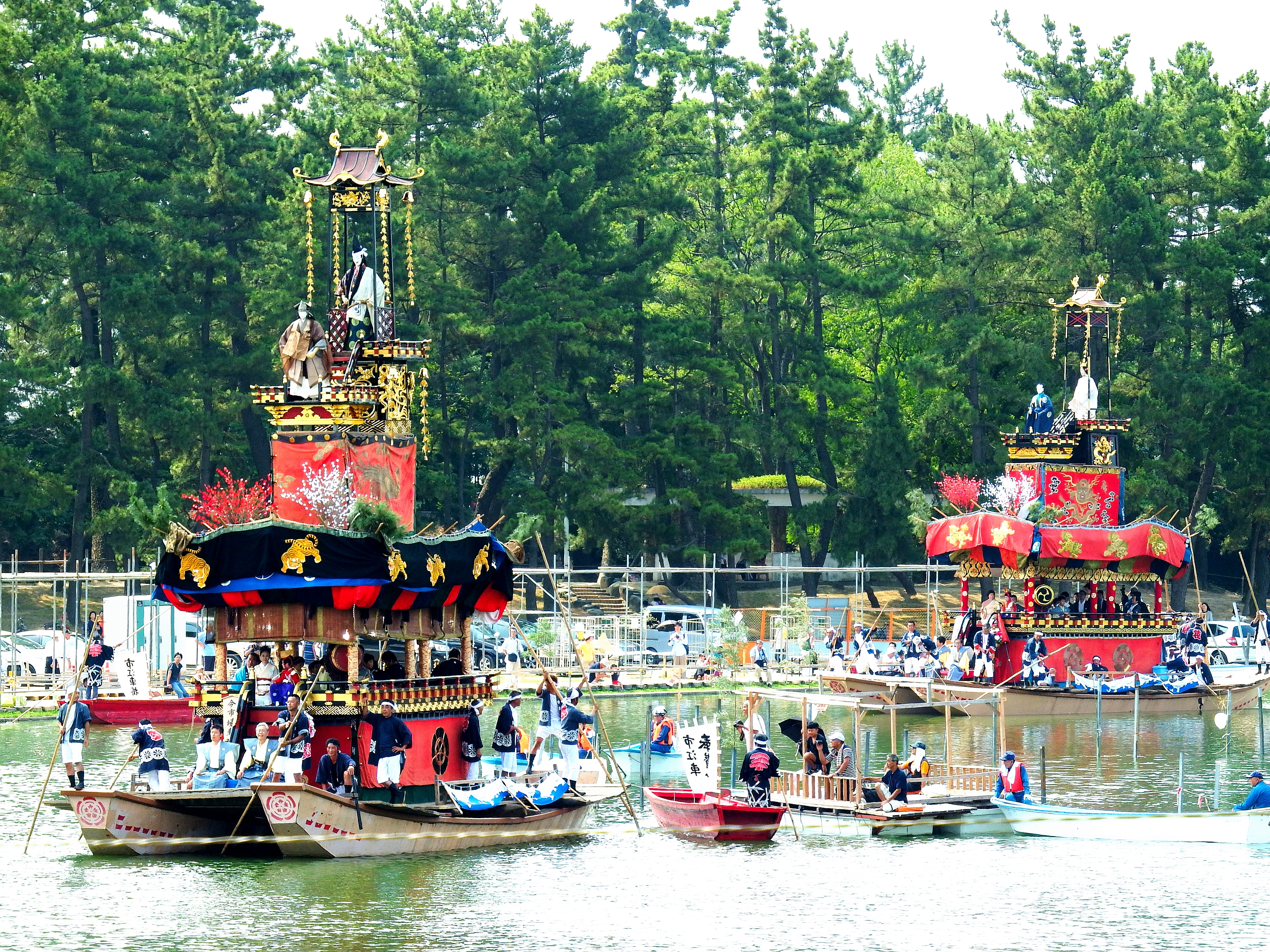
Tenno Matsuri

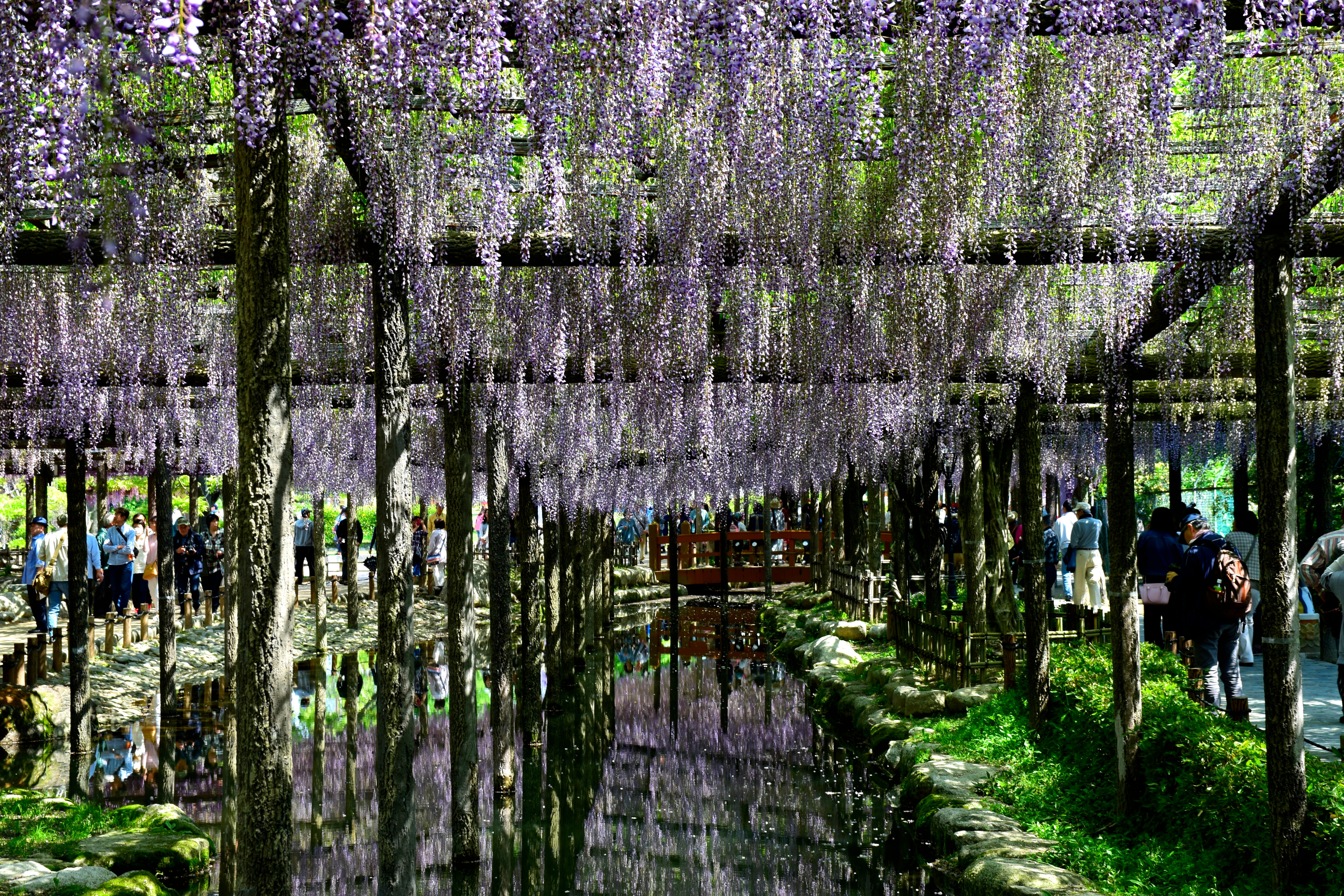
Wisteria Festival

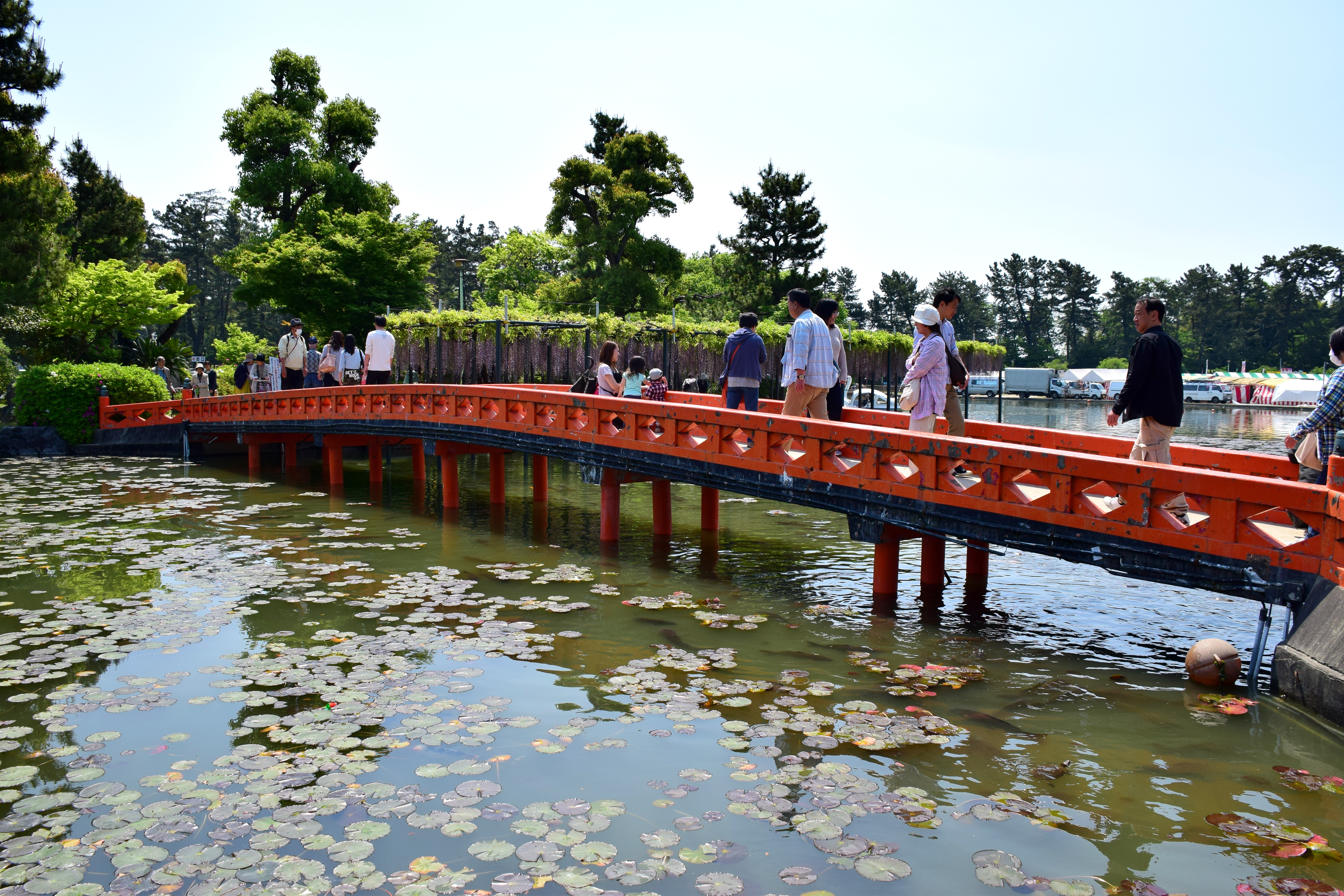
Tennōgawa Park

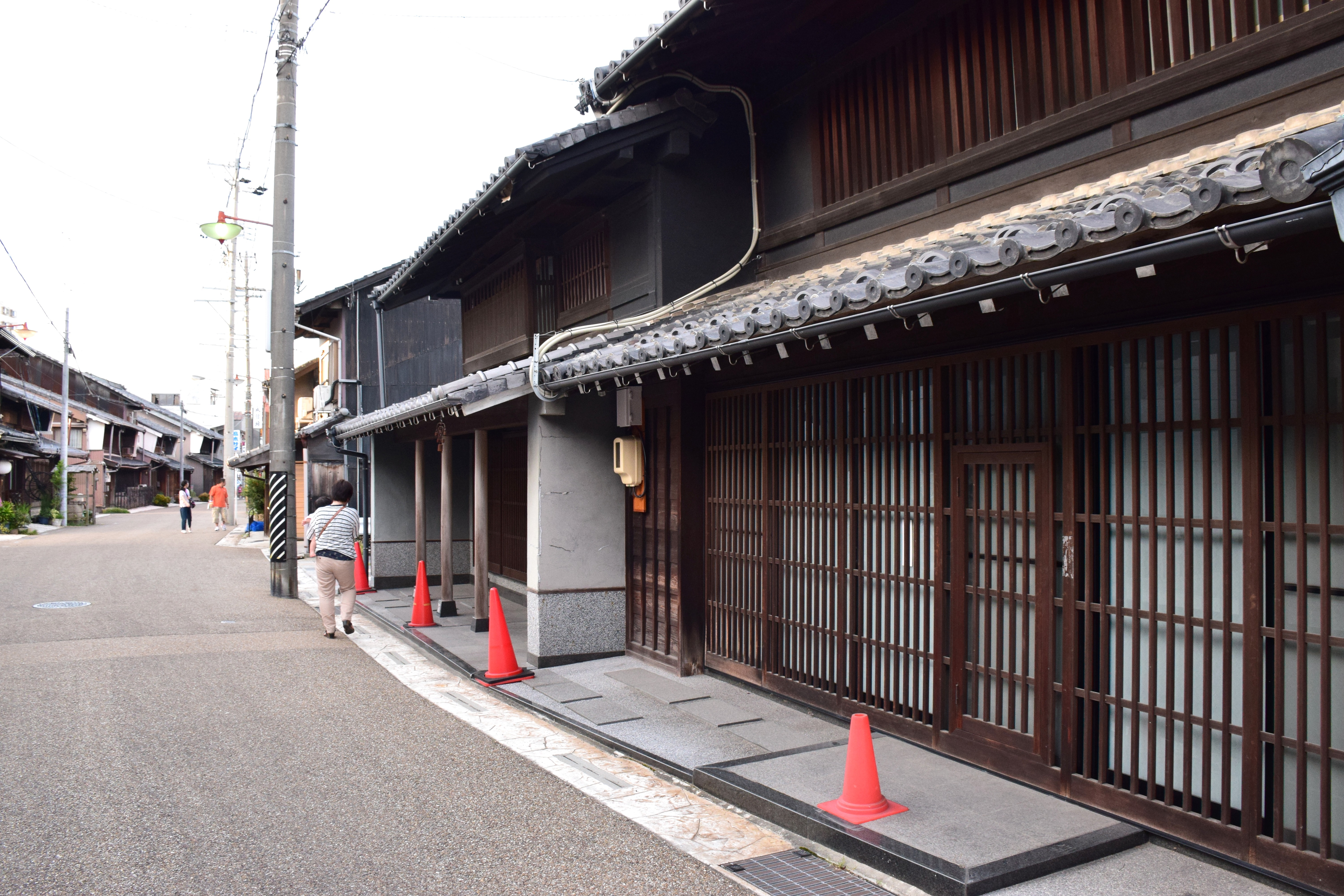
Temple town

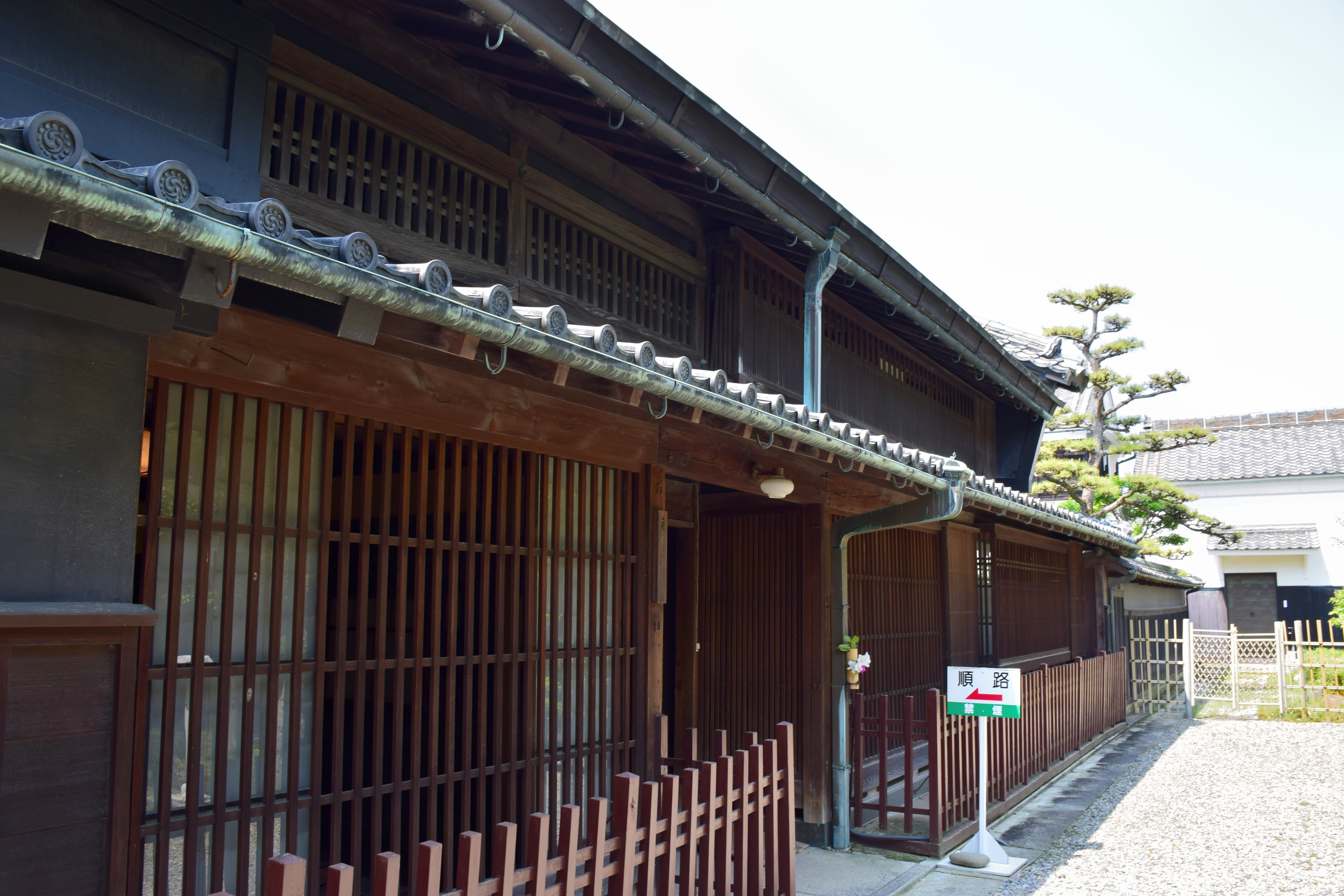
Hottake House

== Culture ==
=== Festival ===
- Tenno Matsuri, a festival with a history of over two hundred years. The highlight of this two-day event is the evening festival in which a dozen boats, each decorated with nearly 400 paper lanterns, float down the Tenno River.

== Notable people from Tsushima ==
- Mitsuharu Kaneko (1895–1975), poet
- Yone Noguchi (1875–1947), poet
- Kanematsu Sugiura (1892-1979), cancer researcher
- Kiyoshi Takayama (b. 1947), yakuza tycoon
