= Ama, Aichi =

Ama あま市
- City
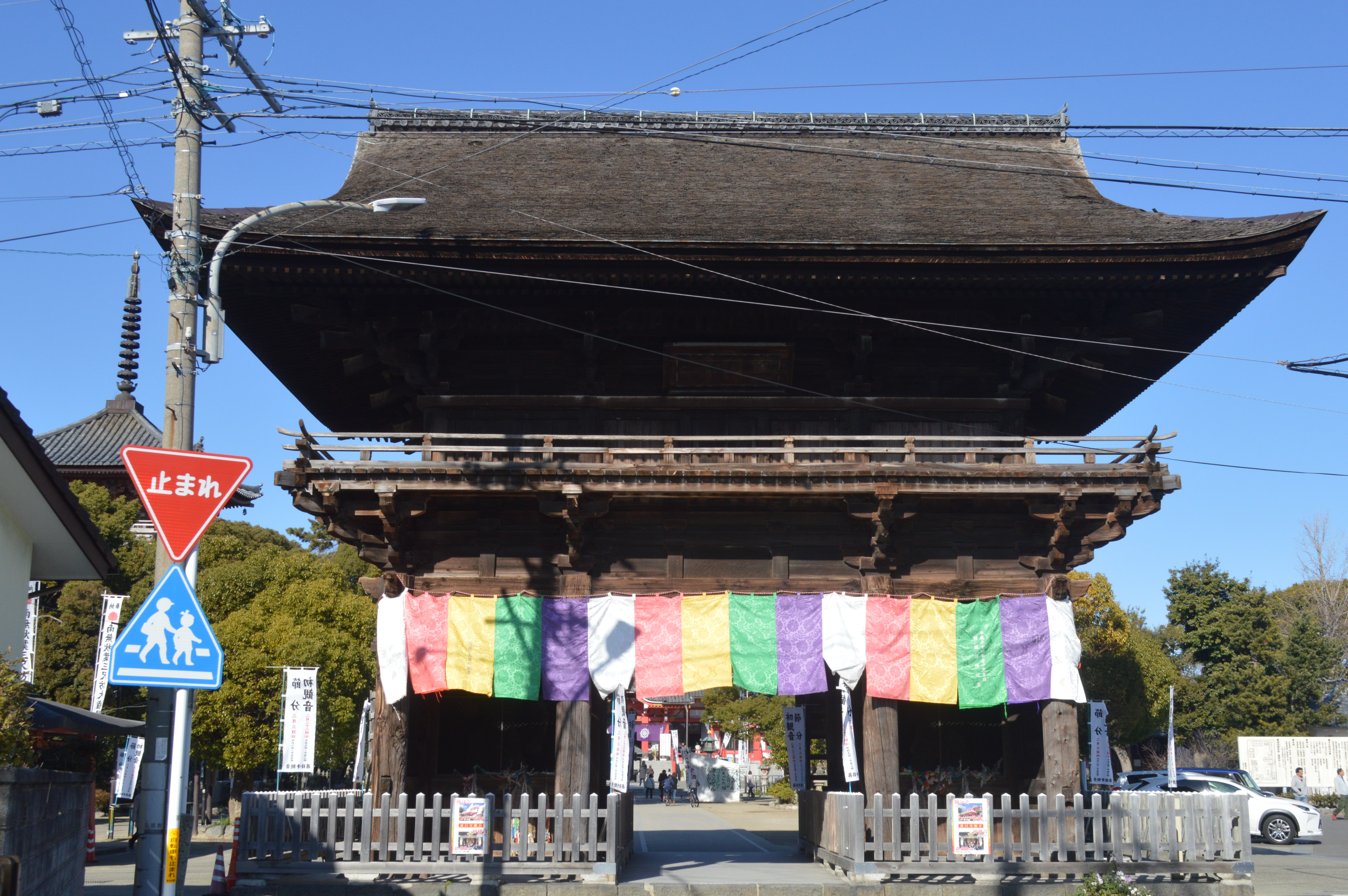
- Jimoku-ji temple

- Flag Emblem

- Location of Ama in Aichi Prefecture

- Coordinates: 35°12′1.6″N 136°46′59.6″E
- Country: Japan
- Region: Chūbu region Tōkai region
- Prefecture: Aichi

Government
  - -Mayor: Koji Murakami (since April 2010)

Area
  - Total: 27.49 km^{2} (10.61 sq mi)

Population (October 1, 2019)
  - Total: 87,651
  - Density: 3,188/km^{2} (8,258/sq mi)
- Time zone: UTC+9 (Japan Standard Time)
- Tree: Flowering dogwood
- Flower: Lilium
- Phone number: 0568–28–0001
- Address: 18-1 Tsuchinotoi, Ama-shi, Aichi-ken 490-1291
- Website: Official website

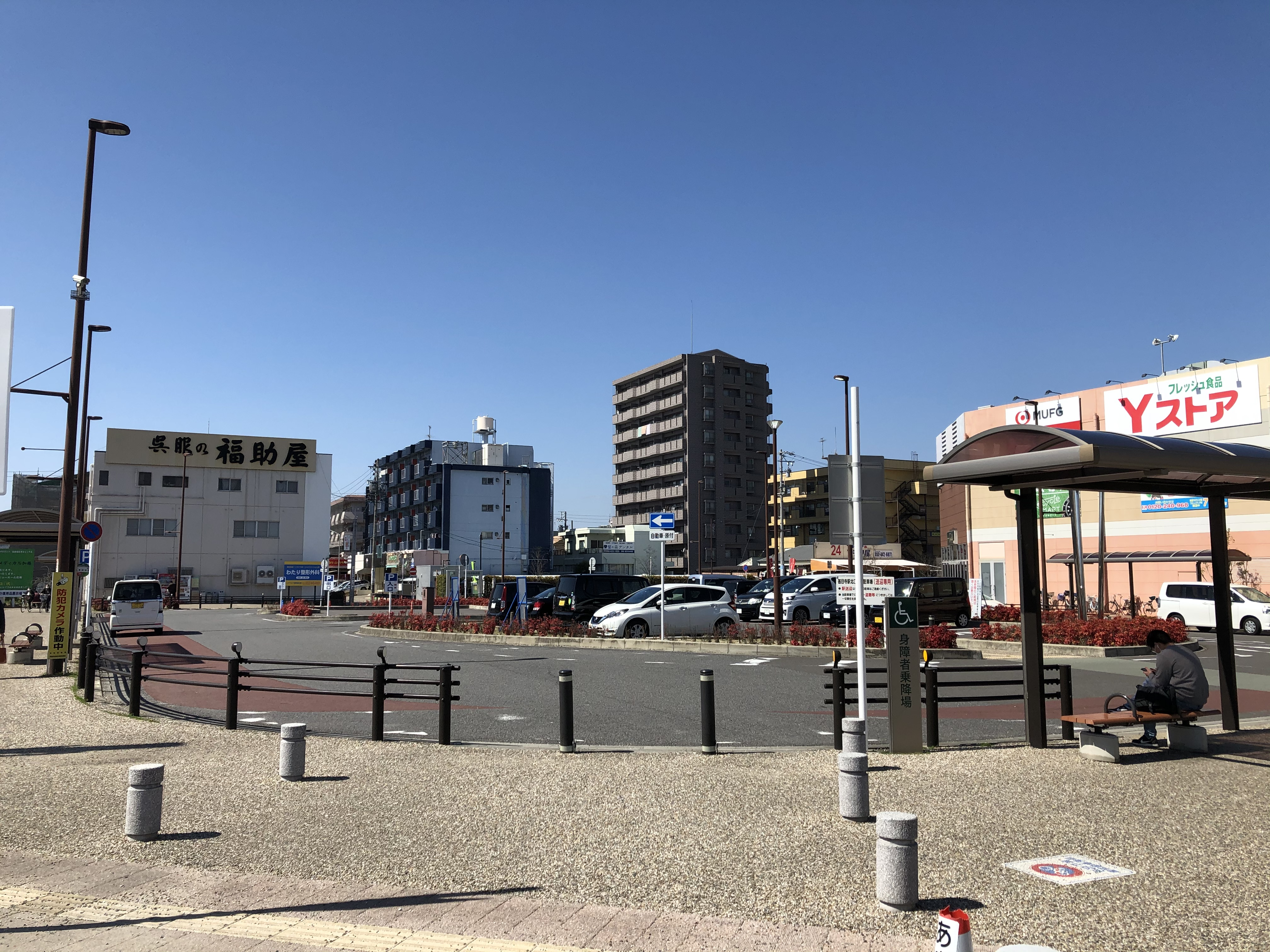
Ama Skyline

Ama (あま市, Ama-shi; Japanese pronunciation: [ä́.mä̀, ä̀.mä́(.ɕì)]) is a city located in Aichi Prefecture, Japan. As of 1 October 2019, the city had an estimated population of 87,651 in 36,997 households, and a population density of 3,188 persons per km^{2}. The total area of the city was 27.49 square kilometres (10.61 sq mi). Ama is a member of the World Health Organization’s Alliance for Healthy Cities (AFHC).

== Geography ==
Ama is located in the far west of Aichi Prefecture in the middle of the Nōbi Plain. The city is at or below sea level. Ama is located 15 minutes from downtown Nagoya by car or train.

=== Climate ===
The city has a climate characterized by hot and humid summers, and relatively mild winters (Köppen climate classification Cfa). The average annual temperature in Ama is 15.7 °C. The average annual rainfall is 1699 mm with September as the wettest month. The temperatures are highest on average in August, at around 28.0 °C, and lowest in January, at around 4.4 °C.

=== Demographics ===
Per Japanese census data, the population of Ama has been increasing rapidly over the past 50 years.

Historical population
Year	Pop.	±%
1950	24,260	—
1960	25,229	+4.0%
1970	48,854	+93.6%
1980	70,190	+43.7%
1990	76,659	+9.2%
2000	82,321	+7.4%
2010	86,608	+5.2%

=== Neighboring municipalities ===
Aichi Prefecture

- Aisai
- Inazawa
- Kanie
- Kiyosu
- Nagoya – Nakagawa-ku, Nakamura-ku
- Ōharu
- Tsushima

== History ==
=== Origins ===
Ama was part of the former Owari Province, and has been inhabited continuously since the Jomon period.

=== Ancient history ===
The temple of Jimoku-ji was founded in the Asuka period by Empress Suiko.

=== Feudal period ===
From the Kamakura period, it was a shukuba on the Kamakura Kaidō. During the Sengoku period, it was the home of the daimyō Hachisuka Masakatsu, whose clan ruled from Hachitsuka Castle. It was also the birthplace of Fukushima Masanori, another Sengoku-period warlord.

=== Early modern period ===
During the Edo period, it formed part of the holdings of the Owari Tokugawa of Owari Domain. From the Edo period, the area was known as a center for Cloisonné production.

=== Late modern period ===
During the early Meiji period, the area was organized into several villages under Ama District, Aichi Prefecture with the establishment of the modern municipalities system.

=== Contemporary history ===
Jimokuji, was elevated to town status in 1933, Miwa in 1958 and Shippō in 1966. The three towns, plus the town of Ōharu began merger discussions in 2008; however, an agreement could not be made with Ōharu, which left the discussions later that year. The remaining three towns passed a referendum in 2009, and the new city of Ama was founded and created on March 22, 2010. The naming of the city came from one of the six candidates, (Nishi-Nagoya, Meinishi, Umibe, Kaitō, Ama, Nishi-Owari) and the name chosen from the votes was Meinishi, but the merger councils decided they want to keep the name “Ama”, despite it having the fewest votes. This resulted in the referendum becoming meaningless.

== Government ==
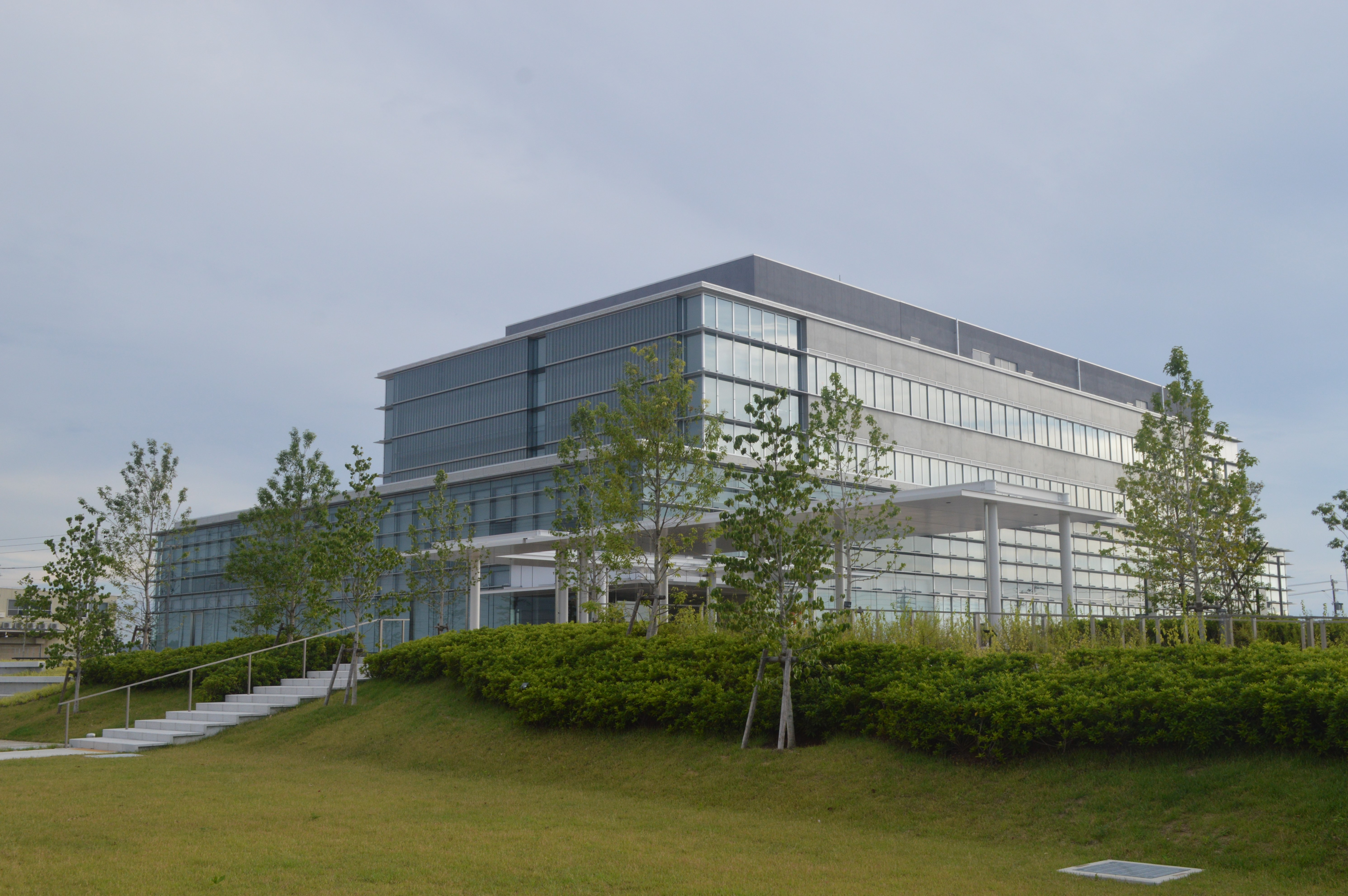
Ama city hall

Ama has a mayor-council form of government with a directly elected mayor and a unicameral city legislature of 22 members. The city contributes two members to the Aichi Prefectural Assembly. In terms of national politics, the city is part of Aichi District 9 of the lower house of the Diet of Japan.

== Economy ==
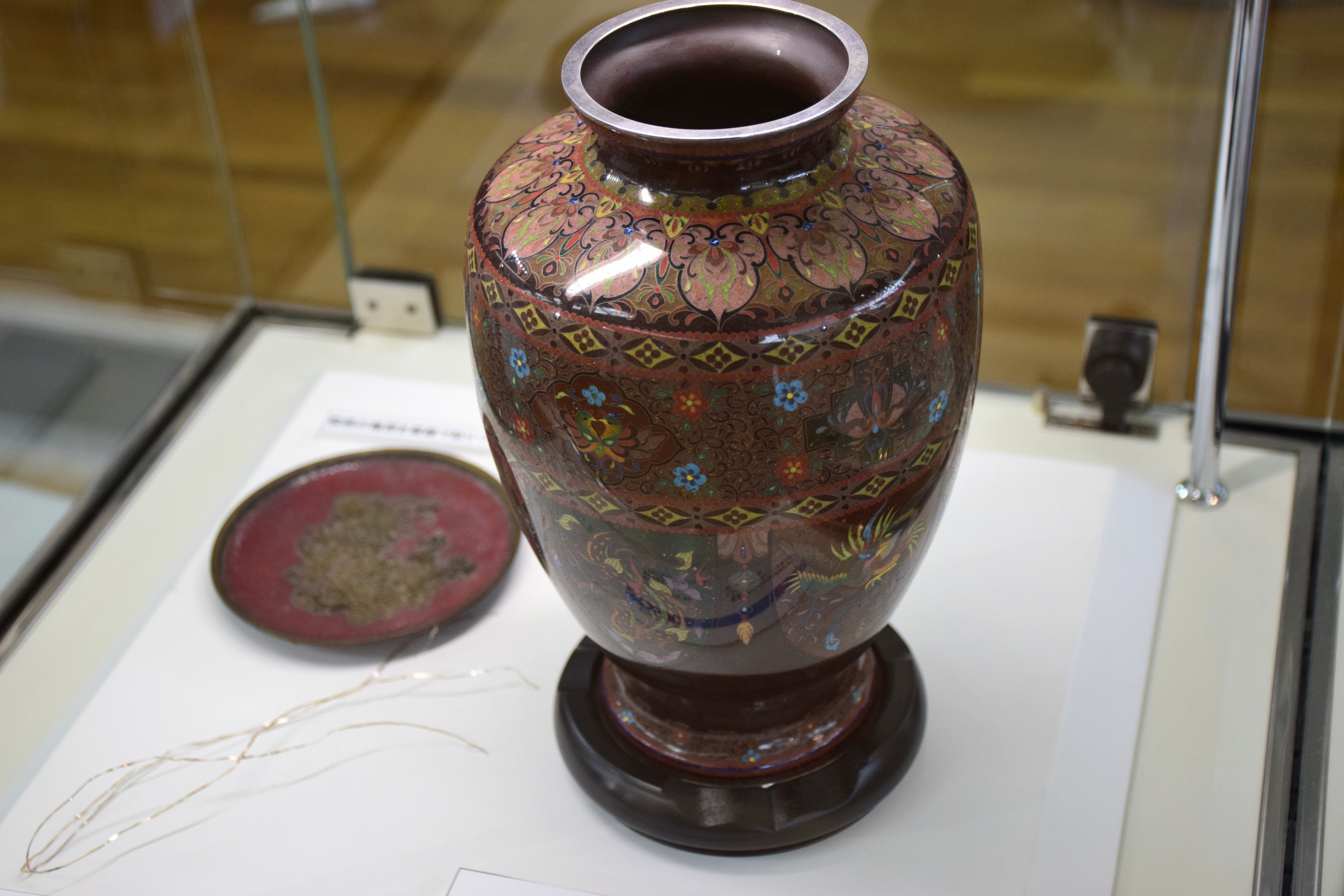
Owari Cloisonné

=== Ceramic engineering ===
- Cloisonné（Owari Cloisonné）

=== Commerce ===
Due to its proximity to the Nagoya metropolis, Ama has developed into a commuter town and its population has grown rapidly.

== Education ==
Ama has twelve public elementary schools and five public middle schools operated by the city government and two public high schools operated by the Aichi Prefectural Board of Education.

== Transportation ==
=== Railways ===
==== Conventional lines ====
Meitetsu

- Tsushima Line：- Jimokuji - Shippō - Kida -

=== Roads ===
==== Expressways ====
- Nagoya Daini Kanjo Expressway
- Higashi-Meihan Expressway

==== Japan National Route ====
- National Route 302

== Local attractions ==
- Shippo Art Village
- Site of Tokushima Castle
- Jimoku-ji, Buddhist temple from the Asuka period

== Notable people from Ama ==
- Nobutaka Hirano, volleyball player
- Koki Kano, fencer
- Hachisuka Masakatsu, Samurai
- Fukushima Masanori, Samurai
- Maeda Matsu, Maeda Toshiie's wife
- Yūko Mizutani (1964 - 2016), seiyū
- Noboru Ogasawara, physician
- Junichi Sato, anime director
