= Tsushima Station =

Railway station in Tsushima, Aichi Prefecture, Japan

Tsushima Station 津島駅

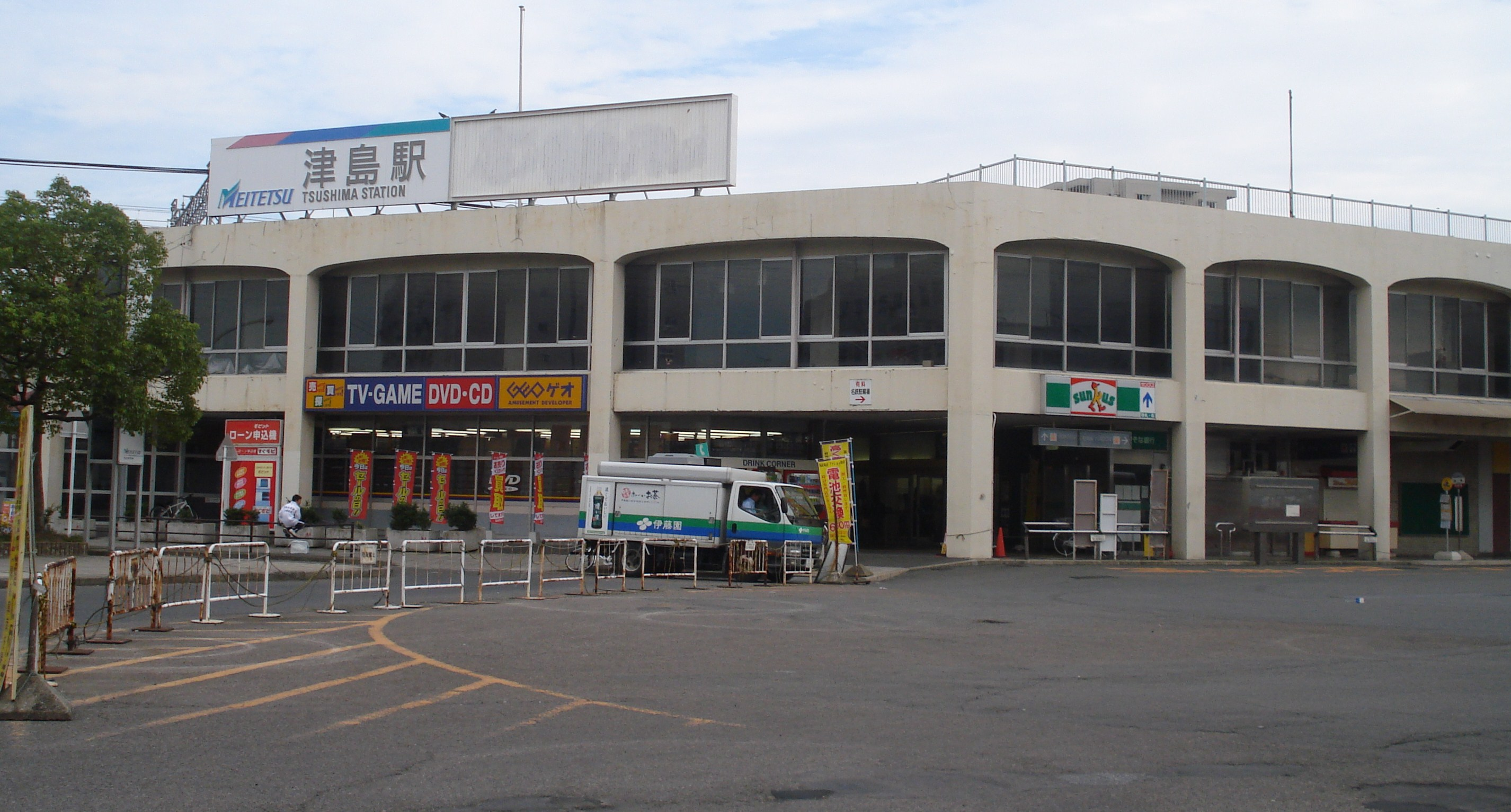
- Tsushima Station in 2016

General information
- Location: 1-1 Nishikimachi, Tsushima-shi, Aichi-ken 496-0802; Japan
- Coordinates: 35.1774°N 136.7312°E
- Operator: Meitetsu
- Lines: ■ Tsushima Line; ■ Bisai Line
- Distance: 11.8 kilometers from Sukaguchi
- Platforms: 1 island platform

Other information
- Status: Staffed
- Station code: TB07
- Website: Official website

History
- Opened: April 3, 1893

Passengers
- FY2015: 1608 daily
Location
- Location within Aichi Prefecture Location within Japan

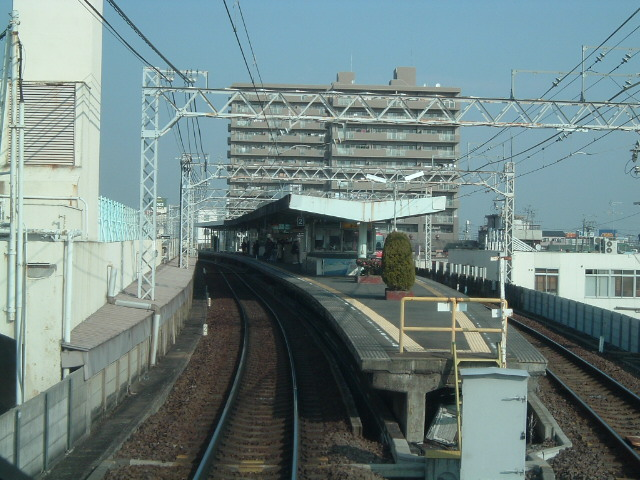
Platform

Track Layout

Tsushima Station (津島駅, Tsushima-eki) is a junction railway station in the city of Tsushima, Aichi Prefecture, Japan, operated by Meitetsu.

== Lines ==
Tsushima Station is a terminal station for the Meitetsu Tsushima Line, and is located 11.8 kilometers from the starting point of the line at Sukaguchi. Its ia also served by the Meitetsu Bisai Line and is 8.2 rail kilometers from the terminus of that line at Yatomi.

== Station layout ==
The station has a single elevated island platform with the station building underneath. Trains of both the Bisai Line and the Tsushima Line use the same platform. The station is staffed.

=== Platforms ===
1	■ Tsushima Line	for Yatomi
2	■ Tsushima Line	For Sukaguchi, Meitetsu-Nagoya
	■ Bisai Line	For Meitetsu-Ichinomiya

== Adjacent stations ==
«	Service	»
Nagoya Railroad
Bisai Line
Hibino	-	Machikata
Meitetsu Tsushima Line
Shobata	Limited Express (特急)	Terminus
Shobata	Express (急行)	Terminus
Shobata	Semi Express (準急)	Terminus
Fujinami	Local (普通)	Terminus

== Station history ==
Tsushima Station was opened on April 3, 1893, as a terminal station of the privately owned Bisai Railroad, on the same day as the opposing terminal, Yatomi Station, and Saya Station. Meitetsu bought the Bisai Railroad on August 1, 1925. On October 25, 1932, former Shin-Tsushima Station on Meitetsu's Tsushima Line was rebuilt as part of Tsushima Station. The tracks were elevated and station rebuilt in 1968.

== Passenger statistics ==
In fiscal 2015, the station was used by an average of 1608 passengers daily.

== Surrounding area ==
- Tsushima City Hospital
- Tsushima Shrine

== See also ==
- List of railway stations in Japan
