= Sukaguchi Station =

Railway station in Kiyosu, Aichi Prefecture, Japan

Sukaguchi Station 須ヶ口駅

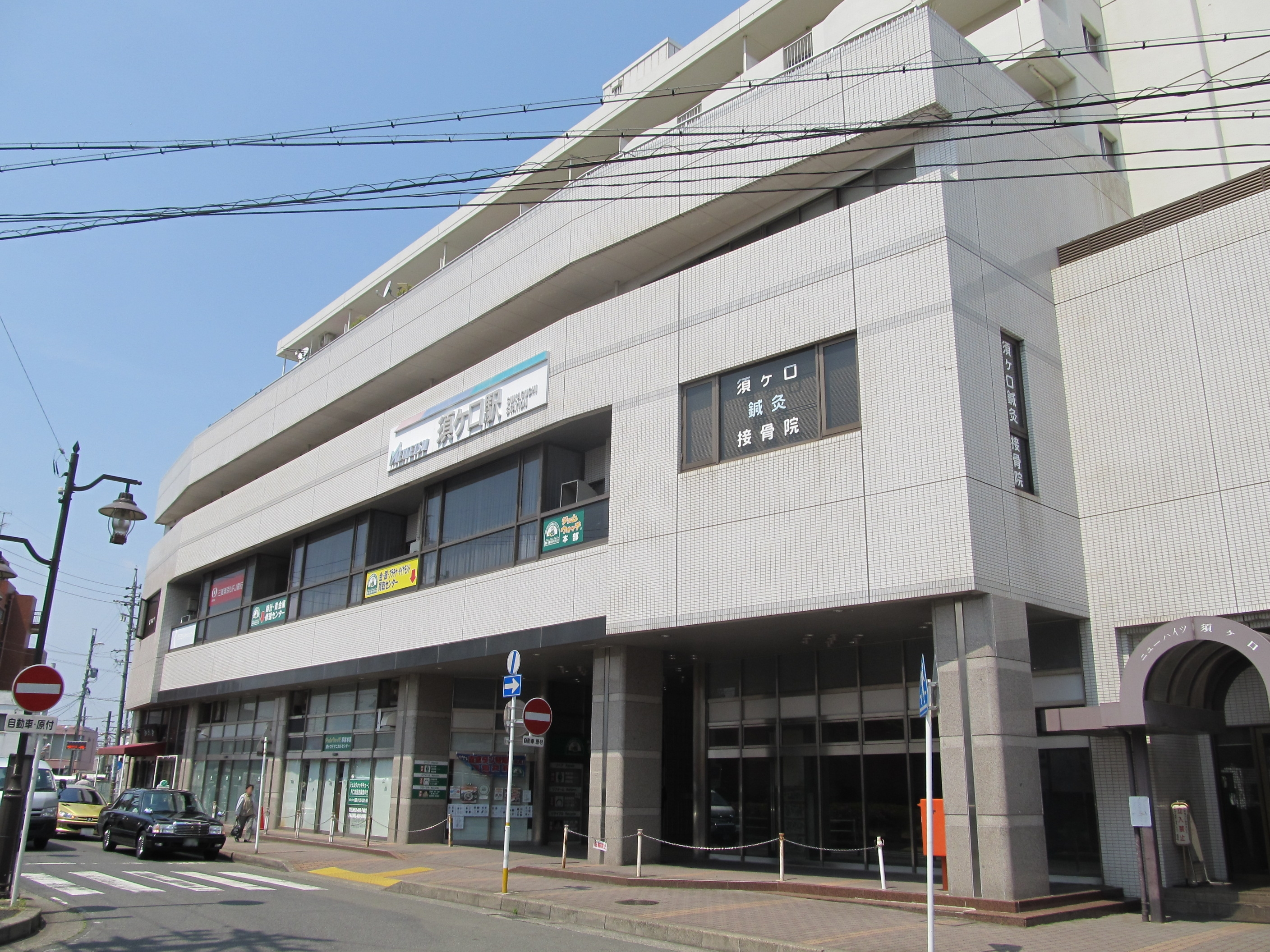
- Sukaguchi Station, April 2004

General information
- Location: 1--1 Sukaguchi Ekimae, Kiyosu-shi, Aichi-ken 452-0912; Japan
- Coordinates: 35.1989°N 136.8464°E
- Operator: Meitetsu
- Lines: ■ Meitetsu Nagoya Main Line; ■ Tsushima Line
- Distance: 73.5 kilometers from Toyohashi
- Platforms: 2 side platforms

Other information
- Status: Staffed
- Station code: NH42
- Website: Official website

History
- Opened: January 23, 1914

Passengers
- FY2013: 7684
Location
- Location within Aichi Prefecture Location within Japan

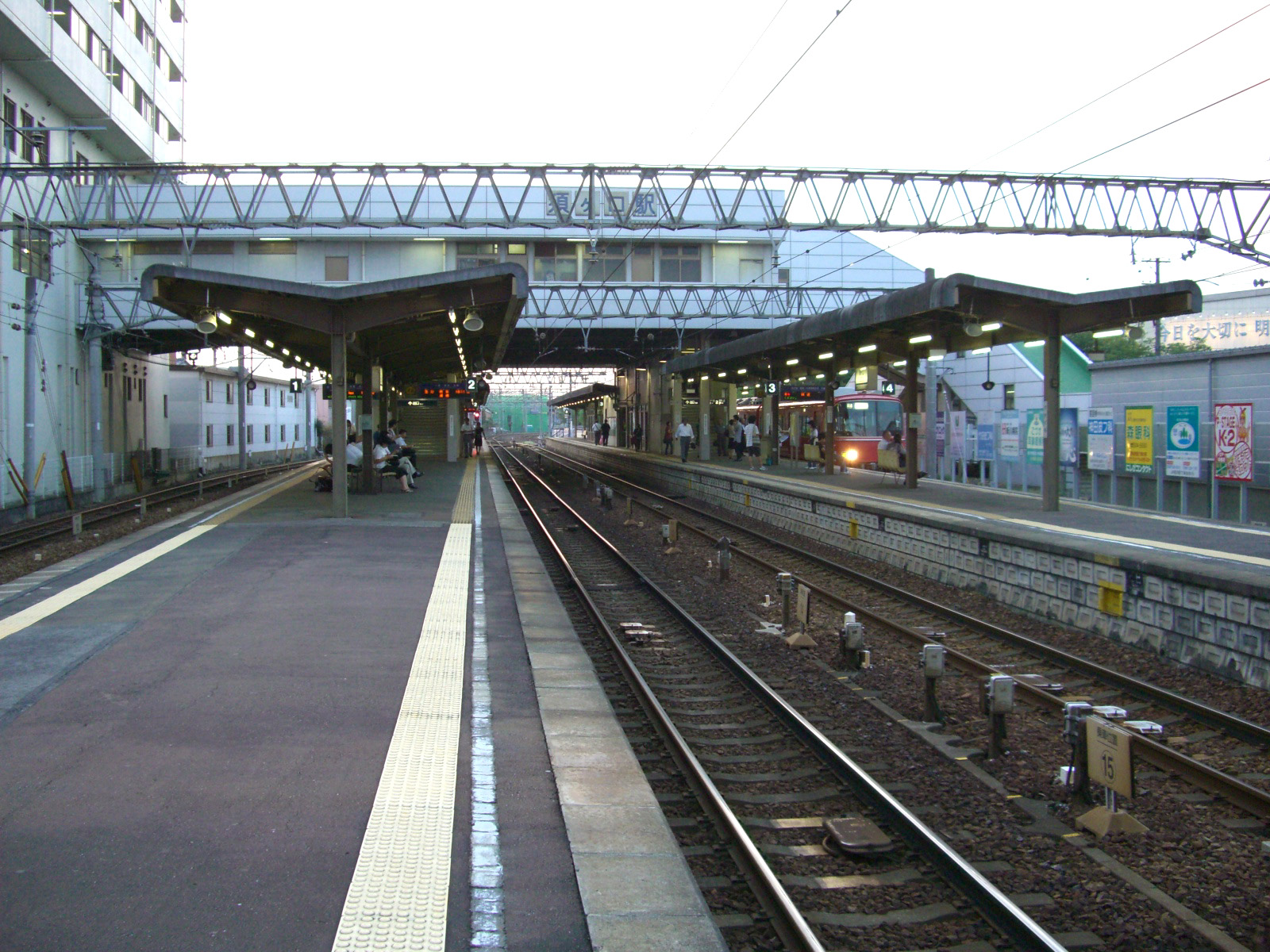
Platforms and tracks

Track Diagram

Sukaguchi Station (須ヶ口駅, Sukaguchi-eki) is a railway station in the city of Kiyosu, Aichi Prefecture, Japan, operated by Meitetsu. It is located to the Shinkawa Inspection Depot for the Nagoya Railway.

== Lines ==
Sukaguchi Station is a junction station served by the Meitetsu Nagoya Main Line and the Meitetsu Tsushima Line. It is located 73.5 kilometers from the starting point of the Nagoya Main Line at Toyohashi and is a terminal station for the Tsushima Line, located 11.8 kilometer from the opposing terminus at Tsushima.

== Station layout ==
The station has two elevated island platforms connected by a footbridge. The station has automated ticket machines, Manaca automated turnstiles and is staffed.

=== Platforms ===
1	■ Tsushima Line	for Tsushima, Saya and Yatomi for Morikami and Ichinomiya via Tsushima
2	■ Nagoya Main Line	for Ichinomiya and Gifu
3	■ Nagoya Main Line	from the Tsushima Line for Nagoya, Higashi-Okazaki, Nishio and Otagawa
4	■ Nagoya Main Line	from Gifu and Ichinomiya for Nagoya, Higashi-Okazaki, Toyohashi, Toyokawa-Inari, Nishio, Otagawa, Central Japan International Airport and Chita Handa

== Adjacent stations ==
←	Service	→
Meitetsu Nagoya Main Line
Meitetsu-Nagoya	Limited Express (1 Gifu-bound train)	Kōnomiya
Meitetsu-Nagoya	Rapid Express	Shin-Kiyosu
Sakō; Futatsuiri (limited stop on weekdays)	Express	Shin-Kiyosu
Futatsuiri	Semi Express	Shin-Kiyosu
Shinkawabashi	Local	Marunouchi
Meitetsu Tsushima Line
Meitetsu-Nagoya (Nagoya Main Line)	Limited Express	Jimokuji
Sakō (Nagoya Main Line)	Express	Jimokuji
Futatsuiri (Nagoya Main Line)	Semi Express	Jimokuji
Shinkawbashi (Nagoya Main Line)	Local	Jimokuji

== Station history ==
Sukaguchi Station was opened on January 23, 1914. The tracks were elevated and station rebuilt in 1988.

== Passenger statistics ==
In fiscal 2013, the station was used by an average of 7684 passengers daily.

== Surrounding area ==
- Kiyosu City Hall

== See also ==
- List of railway stations in Japan
