= Saya Station =

Railway station in Aisai, Aichi Prefecture, Japan

Saya Station 佐屋駅

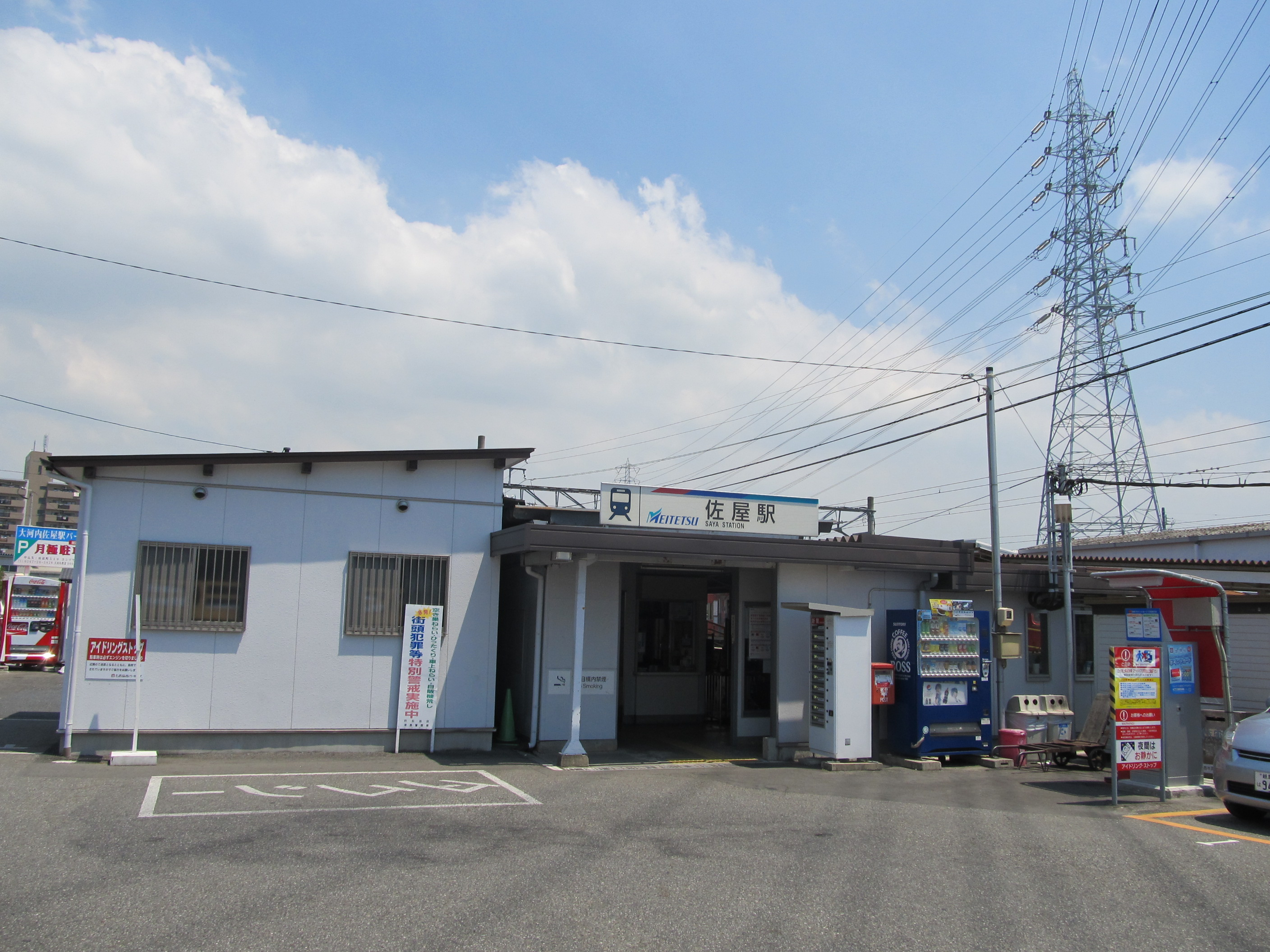
- Saya Station in August 2012

General information
- Location: Saya-cho Sahara 2277, Aisai-shi, Aichi-ken 496-0902; Japan
- Coordinates: 35.1477°N 136.7173°E
- Operator: Meitetsu
- Line: ■ Bisai Line
- Distance: 4.8 kilometers from Yatomi
- Platforms: 1 side + 1 island platform

Other information
- Status: Unstaffed
- Station code: TB09
- Website: Official website

History
- Opened: April 3, 1898

Passengers
- FY2017: 4,280 daily
Location
- Location within Aichi Prefecture Location within Japan

Saya Station (佐屋駅, Saya-eki) is a railway station in the city of Aisai, Aichi Prefecture, Japan, operated by Meitetsu.

== Lines ==
Saya Station is served by the Meitetsu Bisai Line, and is located 4.8 kilometers from the starting point of the line at Yatomi.

== Station layout ==
The station has a single island platform and a single side platform, connected by a footbridge. The platforms are not even: platform 1 can accommodate trains of eight carriages in length, whereas platforms 2 and 3 are shorter, and can accommodate trains of only up to six carriages. The station has automated ticket machines, Manaca automated turnstiles and is unattended.

=== Platforms ===
1	■ Bisai Line	for Tsushima, Sukaguchi, Meitetsu-Nagoya, and Meitetsu-Ichinomiya
2	■ Bisai Line	for Yatomi
3	■ Bisai Line	for Tsushima, Sukaguchi, Meitetsu-Nagoya, and Meitetsu-Ichinomiya

== Adjacent stations ==
«	Service	»
Nagoya Railroad
Bisai Line
Gonosan	-	Hibino

== Station history ==
Saya Station was opened on April 3, 1898 as the middle of three stations on a section of line by the privately held Bisai Railroad, which was purchased by Meitetsu on August 1, 1925 becoming the Meitetsu Bisai Line.

== Passenger statistics ==
In fiscal 2017, the station was used by an average of 4,280 passengers daily (boarding passengers only).

== Surrounding area ==
- Saya Junior High School
- Saya Elementary School

== See also ==
- List of railway stations in Japan
