= Kanie Station =

Railway station in Kanie, Aichi Prefecture, Japan

CJ03 Kanie Station 蟹江駅
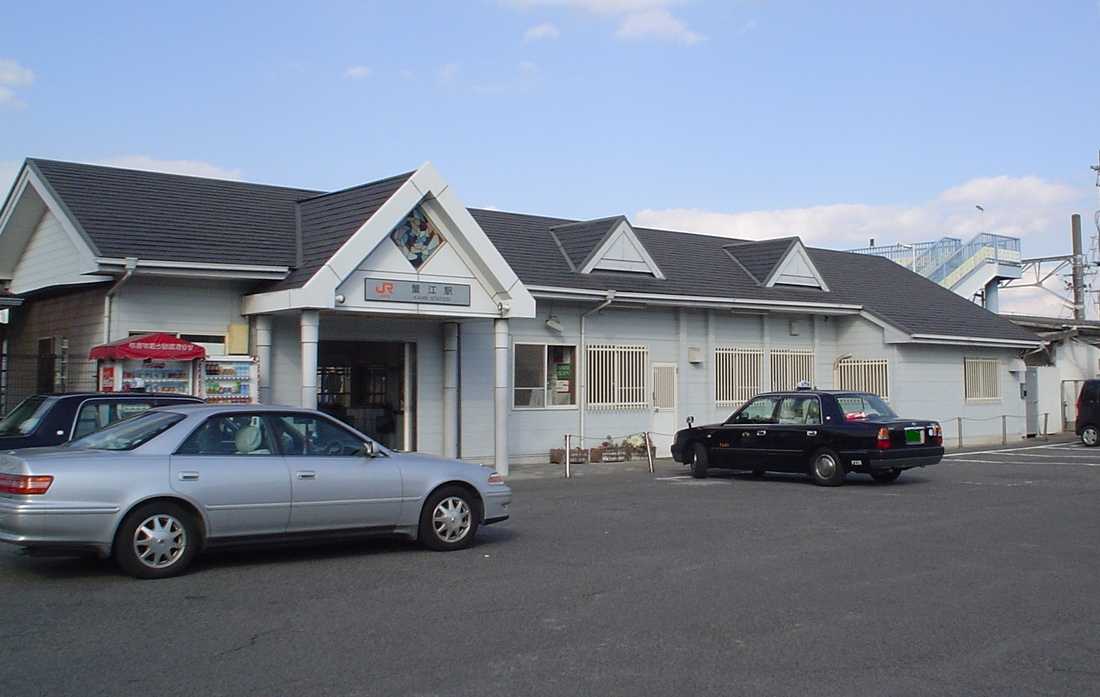
- Kanie Station

General information
- Location: Kamirokutanda-12 Ima, Kanie-machi, Ama-gun, Aichi-ken 497-0032; Japan
- Coordinates: 35.14195°N 136.7939258°E
- Operator: JR Central
- Line: Kansai Main Line
- Distance: 9.3 km (5.8 mi) from Nagoya
- Platforms: 2 side platforms

Other information
- Status: Staffed
- Station code: CJ03

History
- Opened: 24 May 1895; 131 years ago

Passengers
- FY2016: 3560 daily
Location
- Location within Aichi Prefecture Location within Japan

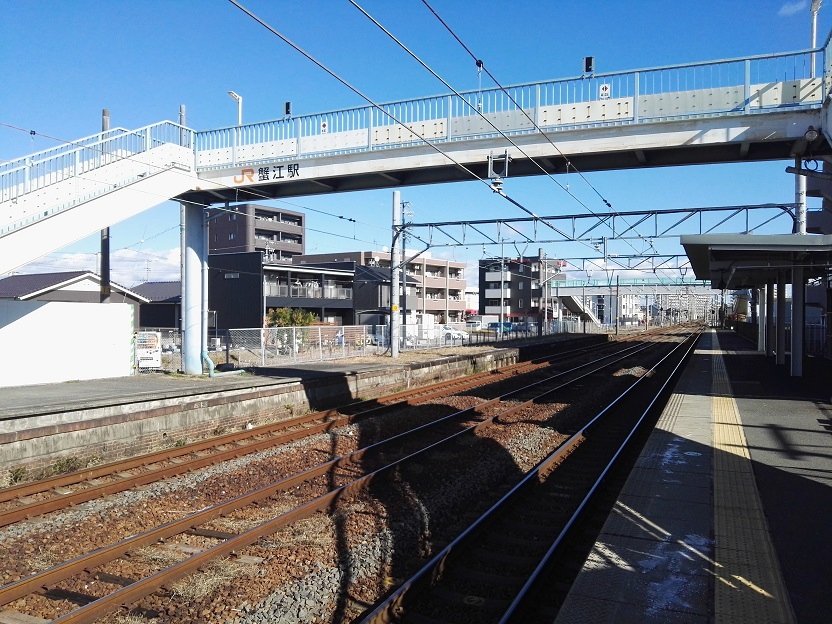
Platform

Kanie Station (蟹江駅, Kanie-eki) is a railway station in the town of Kanie, Ama District, Aichi Prefecture, Japan, operated by Central Japan Railway Company (JR Tōkai).

== Lines ==
Kanie Station is served by the Kansai Main Line, and is located 9.3 kilometers from the starting point of the line at Nagoya Station.

== Station layout ==
The station has two opposed side platforms, with platform 1 adjacent to the station building. The platforms are connected by an uncovered footbridge. Three rail lines pass between the platforms, with the middle, non-electrified line used for freight traffic. The station building has automated ticket machines, TOICA automated turnstiles and is staffed.

=== Platforms ===
| 1 | ■ Kansai Main Line | for Kuwana, Yokkaichi, Kameyama |
| 2 | ■ Kansai Main Line | for Nagoya |

== Adjacent stations ==
| « | Service | » |
Central Japan Railway Company (JR Tōkai)
Kansai Main Line
Rapid: Does not stop at this station
Rapid "Mie": Does not stop at this station
Limited Express "Nanki": Does not stop at this station
| Nagoya | Semi Rapid | Yatomi |
| Haruta | Local | Eiwa |

== Station history ==
Kanei Station was established on May 24, 1895, as a station on the Kansai Railway. The Kansai Railway was nationalized on October 1, 1907, becoming part of the Japanese Government Railways (JGR) system. The JGR became the JNR (Japan National Railways) after World War II. With the privatization of the JNR on April 1, 1987, the station came under the control of JR Central.

Station numbering was introduced to the section of the Kansai Main Line operated JR Central in March 2018; Kanei Station was assigned station number CI03.

== Surrounding area ==
- Gakuto Elementary School
- Sunishi Elementary School

== See also ==
- List of railway stations in Japan
