= Haruta =

Haruta (written: 春田) is a Japanese surname and occasional given name. Notable people with the surname include:

- Junichi Haruta (春田 純一) (born 1955), Japanese actor
- Nana Haruta (春田 なな) (born 1985), Japanese manga artist

== See also ==
- Haruta Station (春田駅, Haruta-eki), train station in Nakagawa-ku, Nagoya, Aichi Prefecture, Japan
