= Kanie =

Kanie 蟹江町
- Town
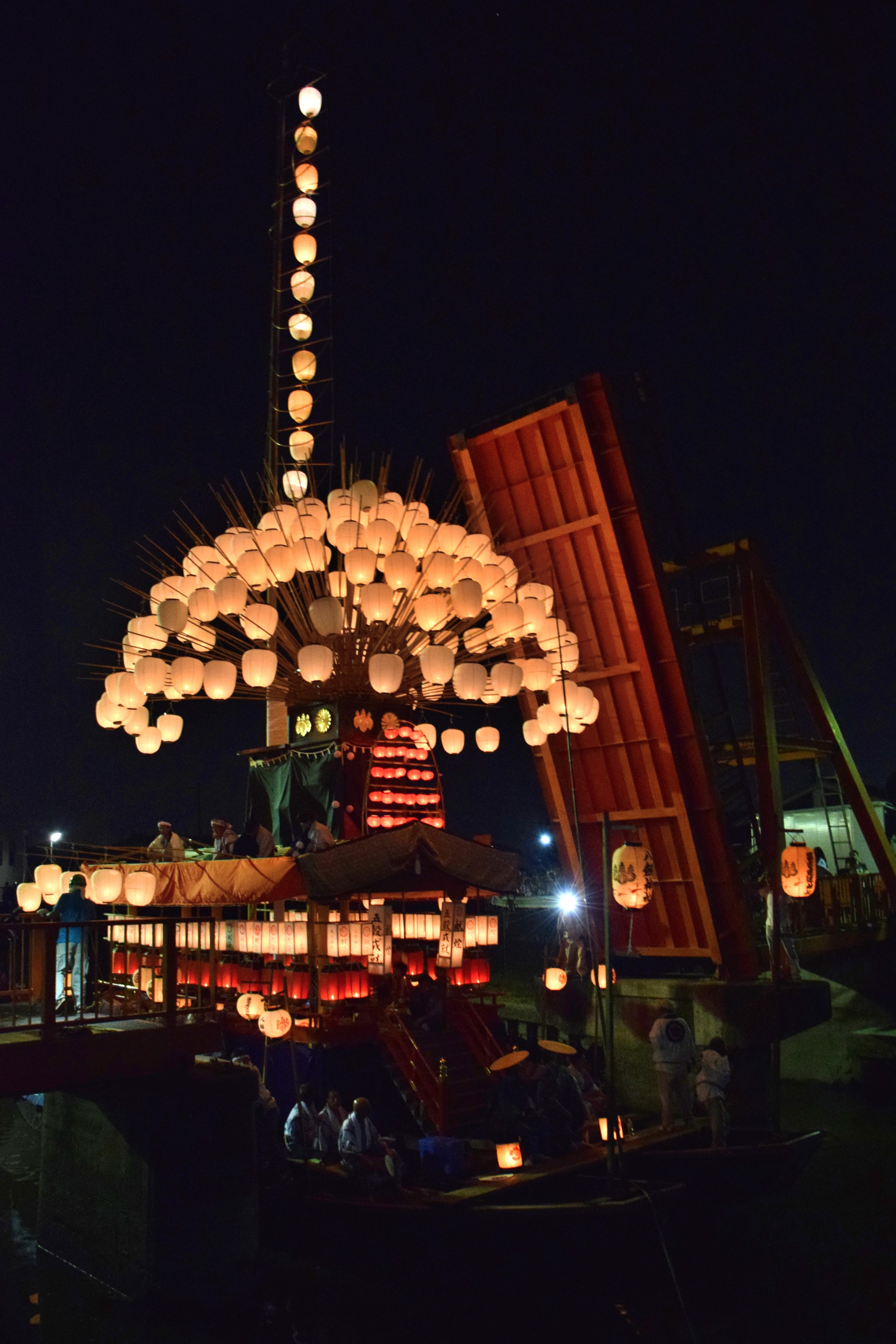
- Sunari Festival

- Flag Seal

- Map of Aichi Prefecture with Kanie highlighted in yellow

- Coordinates: 35°07′56.1″N 136°47′12.5″E
- Country: Japan
- Region: Chūbu region Tōkai region
- Prefecture: Aichi
- District: Ama

Area
  - Total: 11.09 km^{2} (4.28 sq mi)

Population (October 1, 2019)
  - Total: 37,082
  - Density: 3,344/km^{2} (8,660/sq mi)
- Time zone: UTC+9 (Japan Standard Time)
- Tree: Osmanthus fragrans
- Flower: Japanese iris
- Phone number: 0567-95-1111
- Address: 3-1 Gakuto, Kanie-chō, Ama-gun, Aichi-ken 497-8601
- Website: Official website

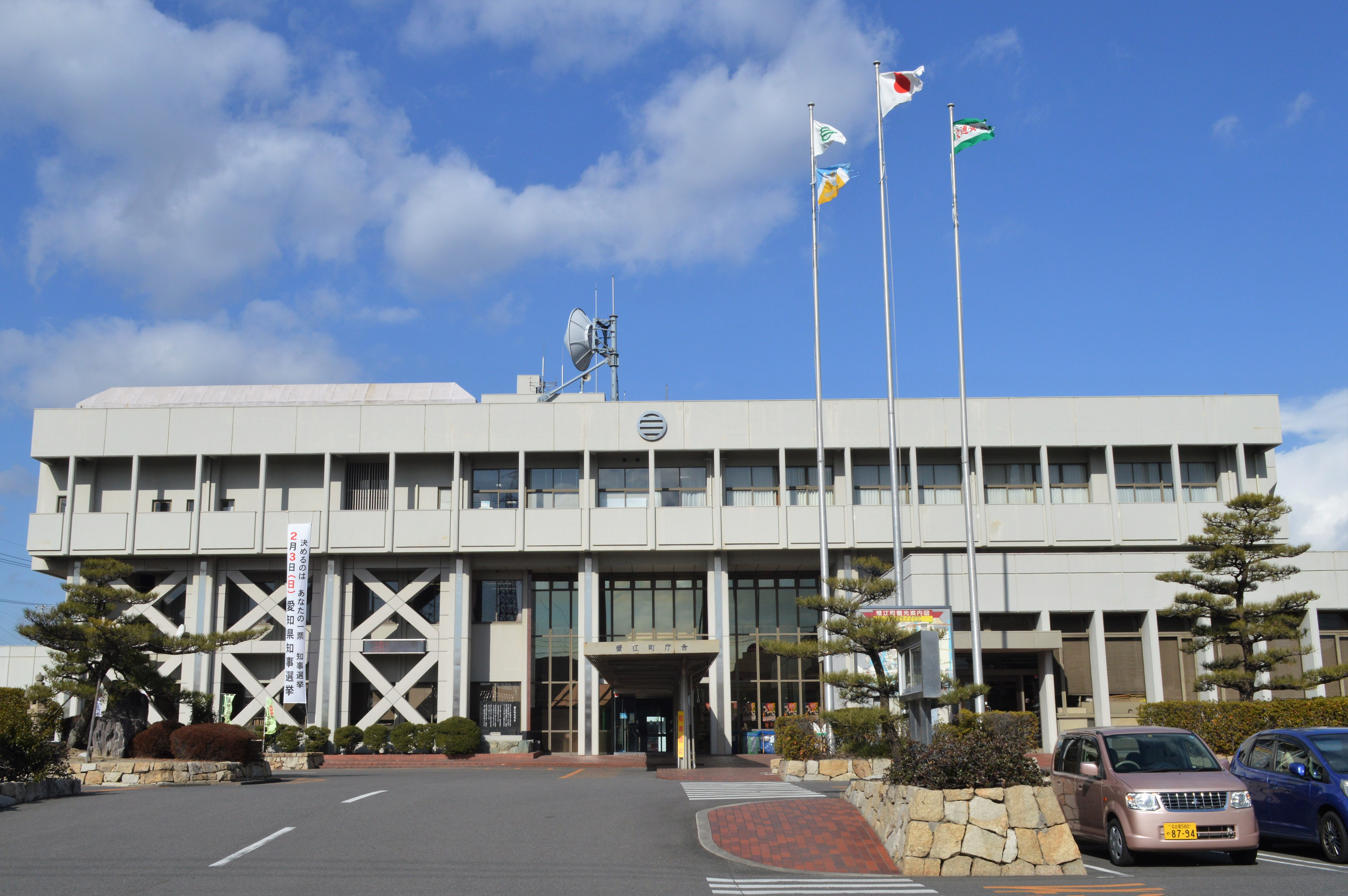
Kanie town office

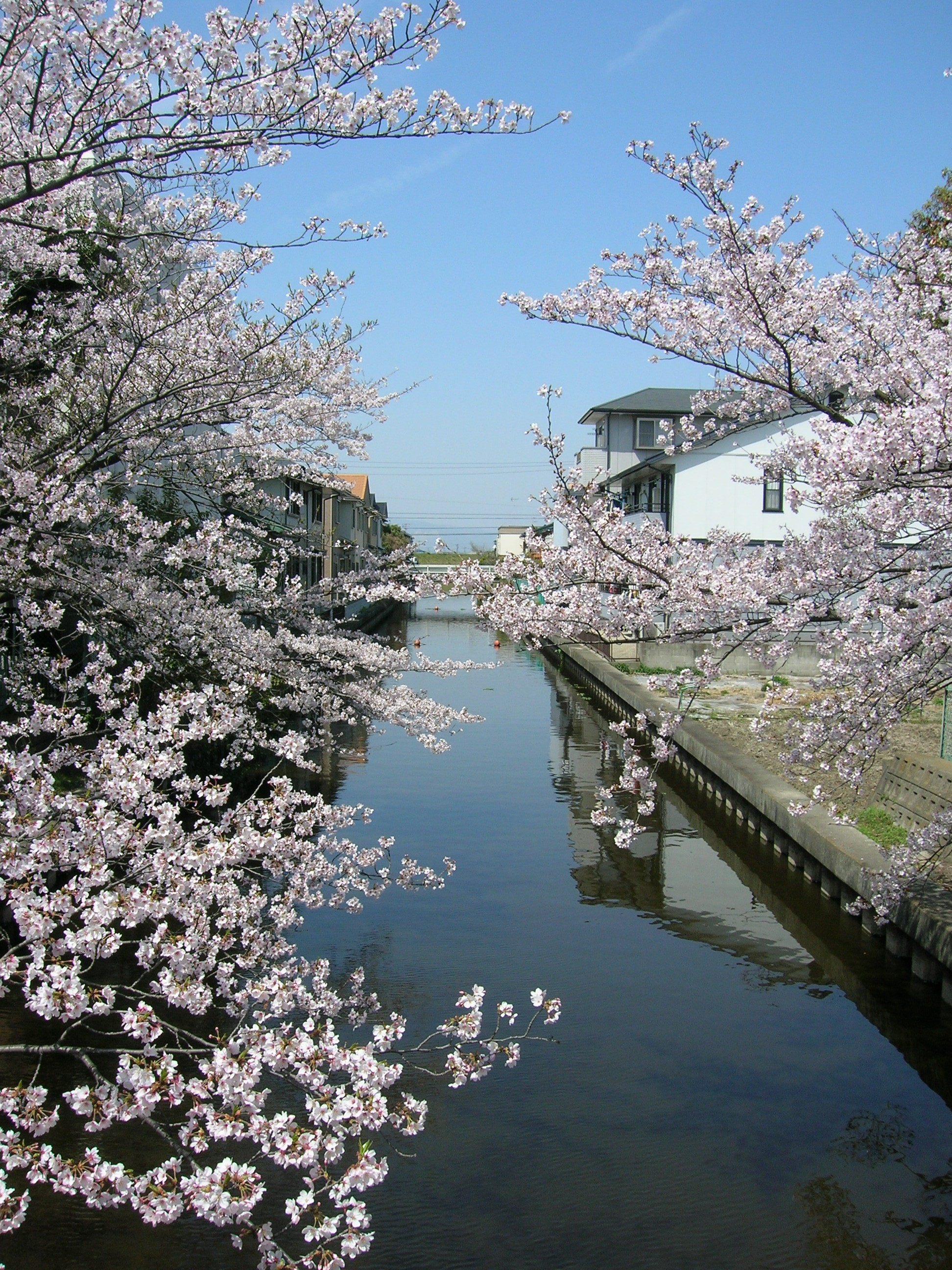
Saya River in Kanie

Kanie (蟹江町, Kanie-chō) is a town located in Ama District, Aichi Prefecture, Japan. As of 1 October 2019, the town had an estimated population of 37,082 in 16,647 households, and a population density of 3,344 persons per km^{2}. The total area of the town was 11.09 square kilometres (4.28 sq mi).

== Etymology ==
The origin of the town's name comes from the once-plentiful crab (蟹, kani) population.

== Geography ==
Kanie is located in the southwest Aichi Prefecture in the extreme end of the Nōbi Plain at the delta of the Kiso River, bordering on Ise Bay to the south. The average elevation of the town is sea level.

=== Neighboring municipalities ===
- Aichi Prefecture
  - Aisai
  - Ama
  - Minato-ku, Nagoya
  - Nakagawa-ku, Nagoya
  - Tobishima
  - Tsushima
  - Yatomi

== Demographics ==
Per Japanese census data, the population of Kanie has been increasing over the past 50 years.

Historical population
Year	Pop.	±%
1960	15,639	—
1970	24,377	+55.9%
1980	30,966	+27.0%
1990	34,428	+11.2%
2000	36,240	+5.3%
2010	36,639	+1.1%

=== Climate ===
The town has a climate characterized by hot and humid summers, and relatively mild winters (Köppen climate classification Cfa). The average annual temperature in Kanie is 15.6 °C. The average annual rainfall is 1678 mm with September as the wettest month. The temperatures are highest on average in August, at around 27.8 °C, and lowest in January, at around 4.4 °C.

== History ==
Kanie was part of ancient Owari Province. During the Sengoku period, it was the site of the Siege of Kanie, where Toyotomi Hideyoshi fought the Oda clan to secure his hold over the province. It was part of the holdings of the Owari Domain under the Edo period Tokugawa shogunate. With the Meiji period establishment of the modern municipalities system on April 1, 1889, the town of Kanie was established. The 1891 Mino–Owari earthquake caused extensive damage to the area. In October 2003, Kanie participated in discussions with regards to a possible merge with neighboring town of Yatomi and village of Jūshiyama. However, negotiations failed in 2004 and Kanie decided to remain as an independent municipality.

== Economy ==
Kanie is primarily a regional commercial center and bedroom community for the Nagoya metropolis.

== Education ==
Kanie has five public elementary schools and two public junior high schools operated by the town government. The town does not have a high school.
Middle schools

- Kanie-Kita Middle School
- Kanie Middle School

Elementary schools

- Funairi Elementary School
- Gakuto Elementary School
- Kanie Elementary School
- Shin-Kanie Elementary School
- Sunishi Elementary School

== Transportation ==
=== Railway ===
Central Japan Railway Company - Kansai Main Line

- Kanie

Kintetsu Railway – Nagoya Line

- Kintetsu Kanie - Tomiyoshi

=== Highway ===
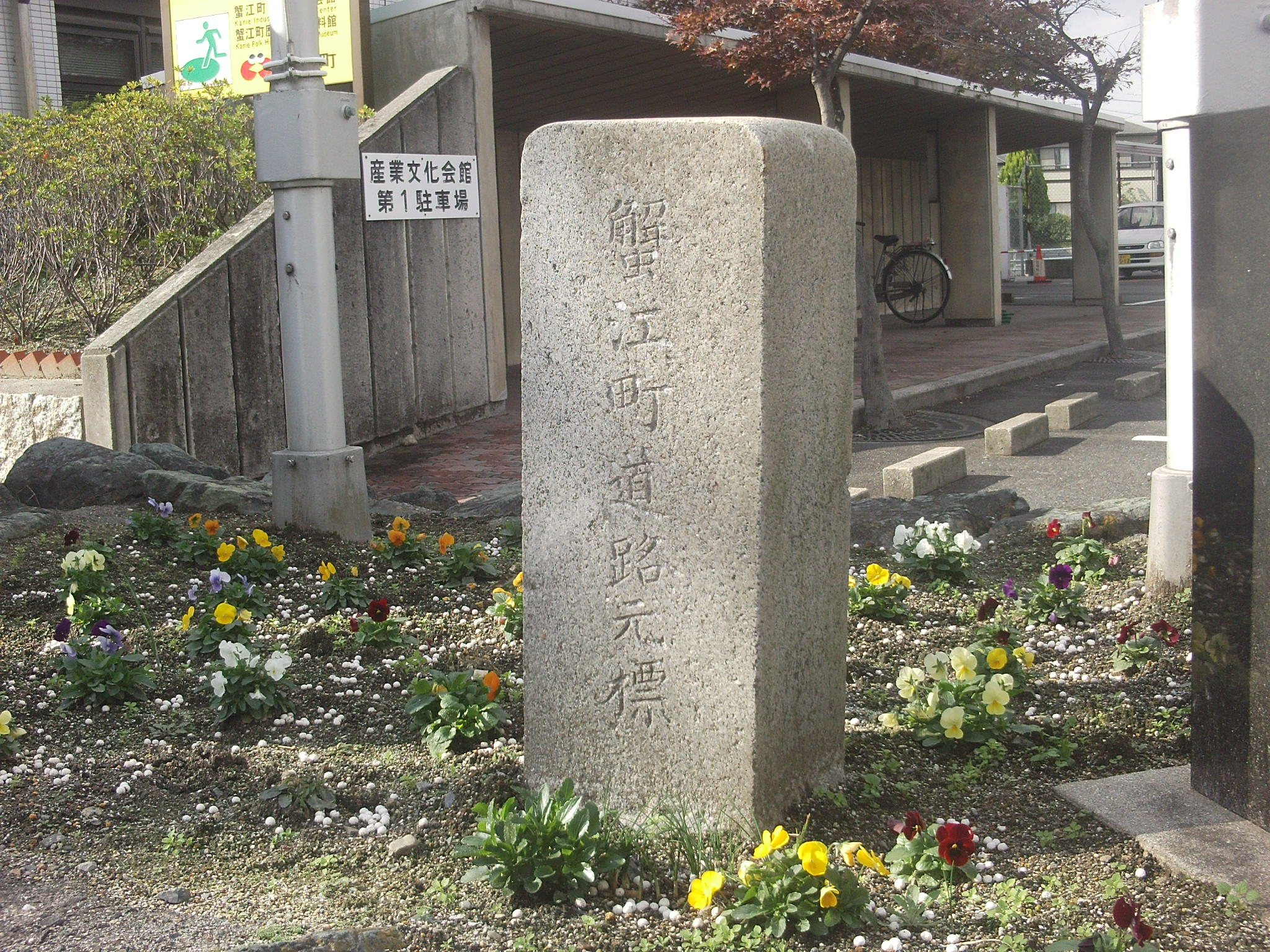
The Kilometre zero of Kanie

- Higashi-Meihan Expressway
- National Route 1

== Sister city relations ==
- (United States) - Marion, Illinois, USA, sister cities since March 26, 2010.

== Local attractions ==
- Owari Onsen hot spring
- Sunari Festival

== Noted people from Kanie ==
- Kisho Kurokawa, architect
- Masahiro Narita, basketball player
