= Hatta Station =

Railway and metro station in Nagoya, Japan

Coordinates: 35.1489683°N 136.8522584°E

CJ01 H02 Hatta Station 八田駅
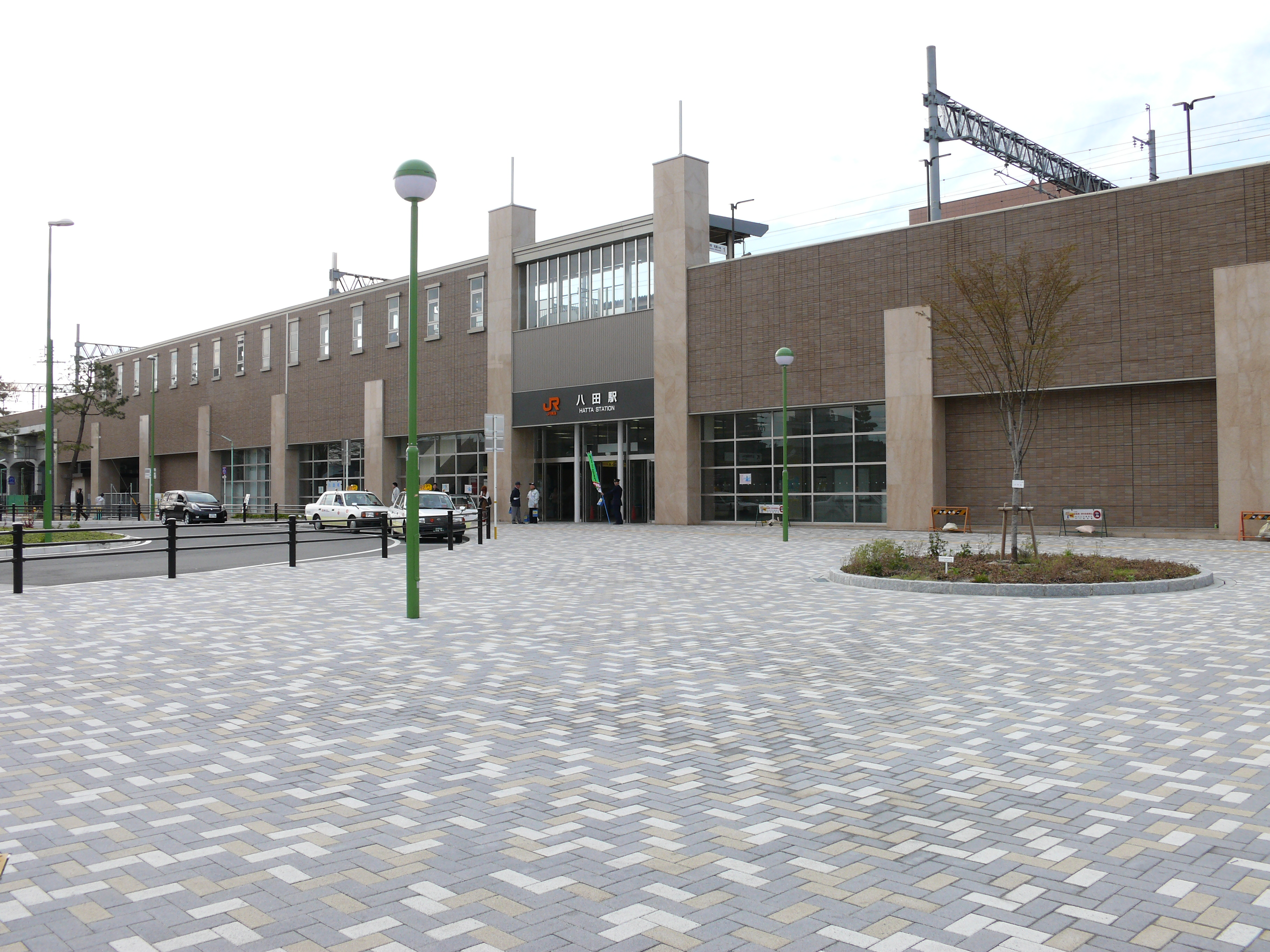
- Hatta Station

General information
- Location: Hatta-cho, Nakamura, Nagoya, Aichi （愛知県名古屋市中村区八田町字長田） Japan
- Operator: JR Central; Nagoya Municipal Subway
- Lines: Kansai Main Line; Higashiyama Line

Other information
- Station code: H02

History
- Opened: February 1, 1928; 98 years ago

Passengers
- 2011: 1541 (JR); 5681 (Nagoya Municipal Subway) daily

Services
Preceding station	Nagoya Municipal Subway	Following station
Takabata H01 Terminus	Higashiyama Line	Iwatsuka H03 towards Fujigaoka
Location

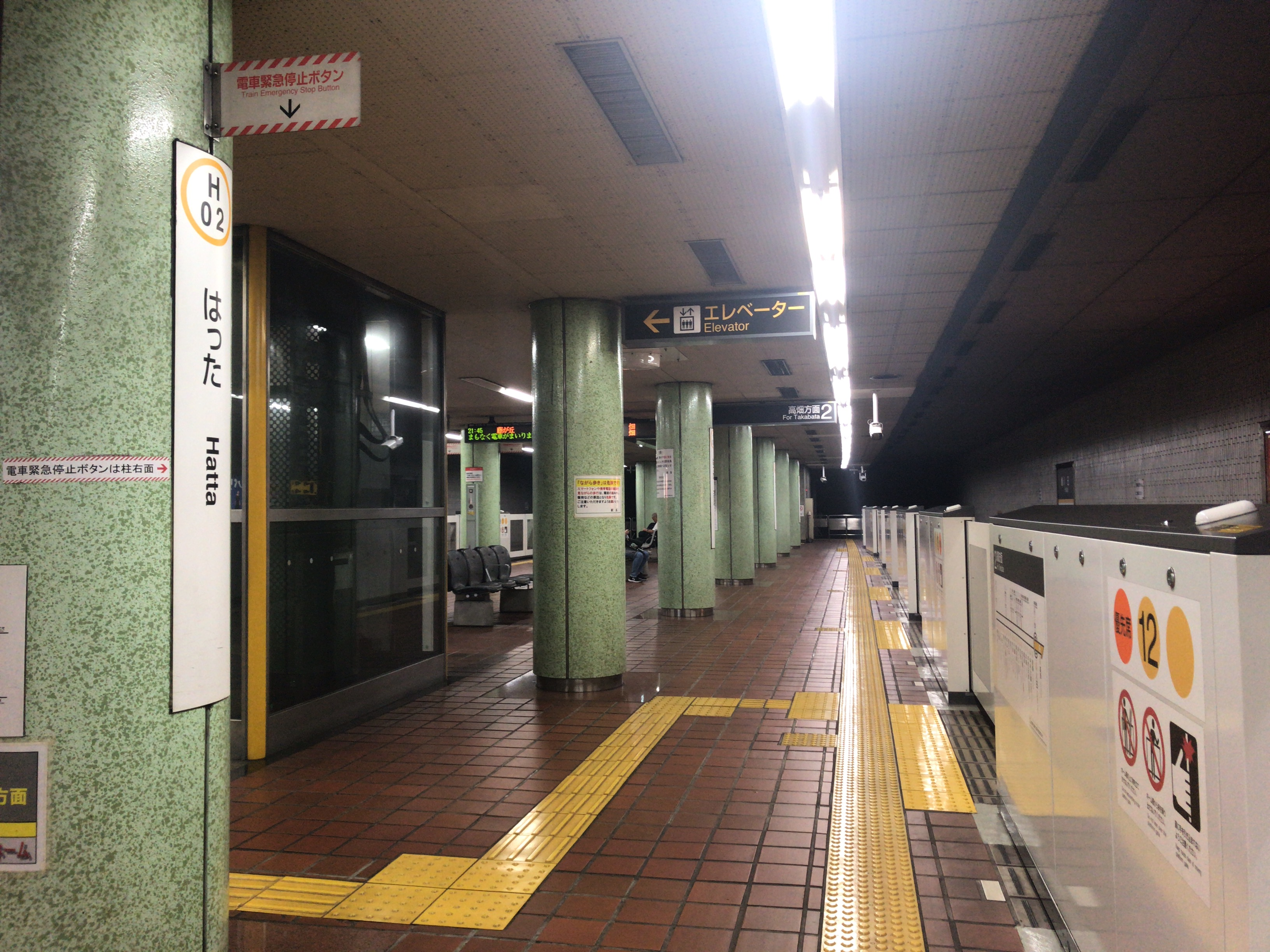
Nagoya Municipal Subway Hatta Station platform

Hatta Station (八田駅, Hatta-eki) is a joint-use railway and subway station located in Nakamura-ku, Nagoya, Aichi Prefecture, Japan. It is located 3.1 rail kilometres from the terminus of the Kansai Line at Nagoya Station and is 0.9 kilometers from the terminus of the Hiagashiyama Line at Takabata Station.

== Lines ==
- JR Central
  - Kansai Main Line
- Nagoya Municipal Subway
  - Higashiyama Line (Station number: H02)

== Layout ==
JR Hatta Station has a one side platform and one island platform serving three tracks. The Nagoya Municipal Subway portion of the station has a single underground island platform.

=== Platforms ===
1	■ JR Central Kansai Line	for Kuwana, Yokkaichi, Kameyama
2	■ JR Central Kansai Line	not in service
3	■ JR Central Kansai Line	for Nagoya

1	■ Higashiyama Line	For Nagoya, Sakae, and Fujigaoka
2	■ Higashiyama Line	For Takabata

== Adjacent stations ==
«	Service	»
Central Japan Railway Company (JR Central)
Kansai Main Line
Nagoya	Local	Haruta
Semi Rapid: Does not stop at this station
Rapid: Does not stop at this station
Rapid "Mie": Does not stop at this station
Limited Express "Nanki": Does not stop at this station

== History ==
Hatta Station was established as Hatta Signal Stop on the Japanese Government Railways (JGR) on July 15, 1918. It was elevated in status to a full station on February 1, 1928. The JGR became the JNR (Japan National Railways) after World War II. The Nagoya Municipal Subway began operations on September 21, 1982. With the privatization of the JNR on April 1, 1987, the station came under the control of JR Central. The station was completely rebuilt on April 7, 2002, and was relocated at that time approximately 500 meters closer to Nagoya.

Station numbering was introduced to the section of the Kansai Main Line operated JR Central in March 2018; Hatta Station was assigned station number CI01.
