= Aisai =

City in Aichi Prefecture, Japan

Aisai 愛西市
- City
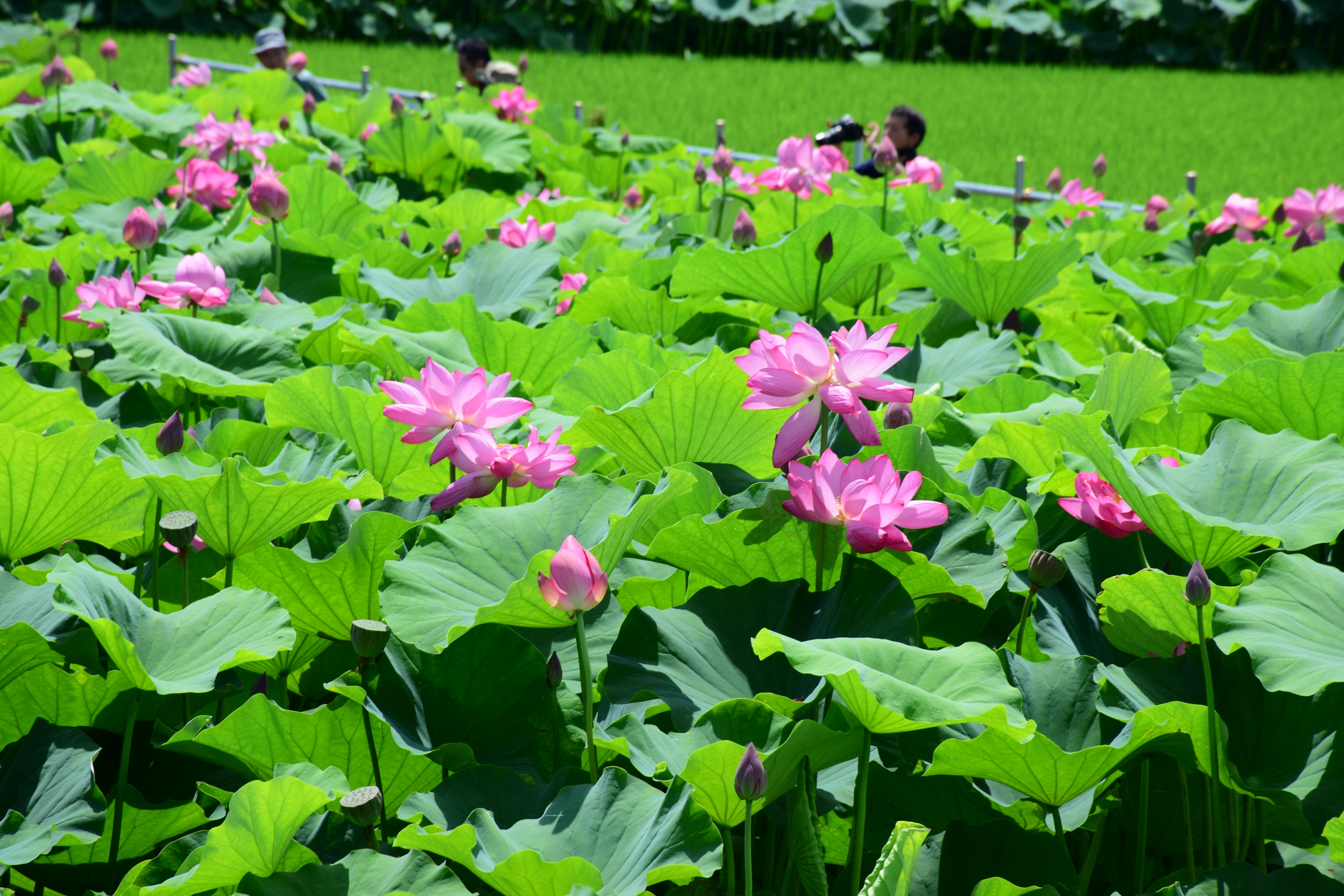
- Morikawa lotus field

- Flag Emblem

- Location of Aisai in Aichi Prefecture, highlighted in pink

- Coordinates: 35°9′10″N 136°43′41.6″E
- Country: Japan
- Region: Chūbu (Tōkai)
- Prefecture: Aichi

Area
  - Total: 66.70 km^{2} (25.75 sq mi)

Population (October 1, 2019)
  - Total: 61,320
  - Density: 919.3/km^{2} (2,381/sq mi)
- Time zone: UTC+9 (Japan Standard Time)
- Phone number: 0567-26-8111
- Address: Yoneno 308, Inaba-cho, Aisai-shi, Aichi-ken 496-8555
- Climate: Cfa
- Website: Official website
- Symbols
- Flower: Nelumbo nucifera
- Tree: Podocarpaceae

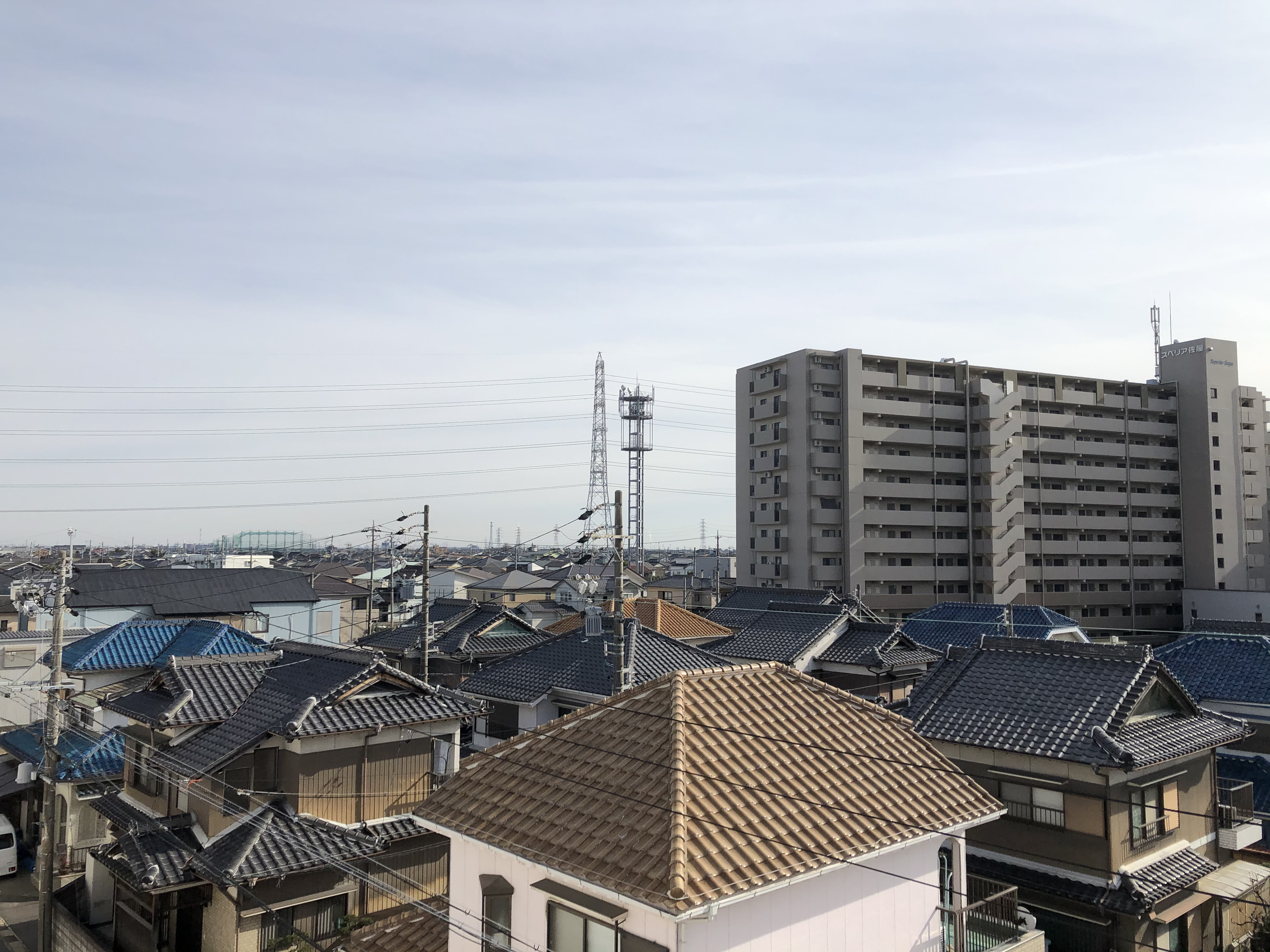
Aisai skyline

Aisai (愛西市, Aisai-shi; Japanese pronunciation: [ä̀í.sä́í, -sä́.í.ɕì, -sä́ì.ɕì]) is a city located in Aichi Prefecture, Japan. As of 1 October 2019, the city had an estimated population of 61,320 in 23,451 households, and a population density of 919 persons per km^{2}. The total area of the city is 66.70 square kilometres (25.75 sq mi). Aisai is a member of the World Health Organization’s Alliance for Healthy Cities (AFHC).

== Geography ==
Aisai is located in the coastal flatlands of far western Aichi Prefecture, bordering Gifu Prefecture to the west. It has a short border with Mie Prefecture to the southwest. The Kiso River and the Nagara River pass through the city.

=== Climate ===
The city has a climate characterized by hot and humid summers, and relatively mild winters (Köppen climate classification Cfa). The average annual temperature in Aisai is 15.6 °C (60.1 °F). The average annual rainfall is 1,729.9 mm (68.11 in) with September as the wettest month. The temperatures are highest on average in August, at around 27.7 °C (81.9 °F), and lowest in January, at around 4.2 °C (39.6 °F).

Climate data for Aisai (1991−2020 normals, extremes 1979−present)
| Month | Jan | Feb | Mar | Apr | May | Jun | Jul | Aug | Sep | Oct | Nov | Dec | Year |
|---|---|---|---|---|---|---|---|---|---|---|---|---|---|
| Record high °C (°F) | 17.5 (63.5) | 21.1 (70.0) | 24.8 (76.6) | 29.1 (84.4) | 33.6 (92.5) | 36.8 (98.2) | 39.3 (102.7) | 40.3 (104.5) | 37.9 (100.2) | 31.8 (89.2) | 25.7 (78.3) | 22.0 (71.6) | 40.3 (104.5) |
| Mean daily maximum °C (°F) | 8.8 (47.8) | 9.9 (49.8) | 13.8 (56.8) | 19.5 (67.1) | 24.2 (75.6) | 27.4 (81.3) | 31.2 (88.2) | 33.0 (91.4) | 28.9 (84.0) | 23.1 (73.6) | 17.1 (62.8) | 11.3 (52.3) | 20.7 (69.2) |
| Daily mean °C (°F) | 4.2 (39.6) | 4.9 (40.8) | 8.4 (47.1) | 13.8 (56.8) | 18.8 (65.8) | 22.6 (72.7) | 26.5 (79.7) | 27.7 (81.9) | 23.8 (74.8) | 17.9 (64.2) | 11.8 (53.2) | 6.5 (43.7) | 15.6 (60.0) |
| Mean daily minimum °C (°F) | 0.2 (32.4) | 0.6 (33.1) | 3.6 (38.5) | 8.7 (47.7) | 14.1 (57.4) | 18.8 (65.8) | 22.9 (73.2) | 23.9 (75.0) | 20.0 (68.0) | 13.7 (56.7) | 7.3 (45.1) | 2.2 (36.0) | 11.3 (52.4) |
| Record low °C (°F) | −7.8 (18.0) | −8.5 (16.7) | −7.5 (18.5) | −0.8 (30.6) | 4.7 (40.5) | 12.0 (53.6) | 16.2 (61.2) | 15.8 (60.4) | 10.6 (51.1) | 2.0 (35.6) | −1.7 (28.9) | −6.0 (21.2) | −8.5 (16.7) |
| Average precipitation mm (inches) | 57.2 (2.25) | 67.9 (2.67) | 122.8 (4.83) | 149.3 (5.88) | 175.1 (6.89) | 213.2 (8.39) | 223.5 (8.80) | 164.3 (6.47) | 244.0 (9.61) | 166.6 (6.56) | 82.1 (3.23) | 64.0 (2.52) | 1,729.9 (68.11) |
| Average precipitation days (≥ 1.0 mm) | 6.9 | 7.2 | 9.6 | 9.7 | 10.1 | 11.9 | 12.5 | 9.1 | 11.2 | 9.1 | 6.7 | 7.6 | 111.6 |
| Mean monthly sunshine hours | 157.5 | 161.3 | 192.0 | 196.8 | 200.5 | 153.9 | 171.1 | 210.2 | 160.1 | 163.2 | 152.2 | 148.7 | 2,067.5 |
Source: Japan Meteorological Agency

=== Demographics ===
Per Japanese census data, the population of Aisai had been steadily growing for about 30 years until 2015, when it began to decrease.

Historical population
| Year | Pop. | ±% |
|---|---|---|
| 1960 | 38,629 | — |
| 1970 | 48,104 | +24.5% |
| 1980 | 61,337 | +27.5% |
| 1990 | 63,143 | +2.9% |
| 2000 | 65,597 | +3.9% |
| 2010 | 64,981 | −0.9% |
| 2020 | 60,829 | −6.4% |

=== Surrounding municipalities ===
Aichi Prefecture

- Ama
- Inazawa
- Kanie
- Tsushima
- Yatomi

Mie Prefecture

- Kuwana

Gifu Prefecture

- Kaizu

== History ==
=== Early modern period ===
During the Edo period, the area of modern Aisai was controlled by the Yokoi clan, retainers of the Owari Tokugawa of Nagoya.

=== Late modern period ===
During the Meiji period, the area was organized into several villages under Kasai District and Kaito District, Aichi Prefecture, which later became Ama District, Aichi in the Taishō period.

=== Contemporary history ===
The city of Aisai was created through the merger on April 1, 2005 of the towns of Saya and Saori and villages of Hachikai and Tatsuta.

== Government ==
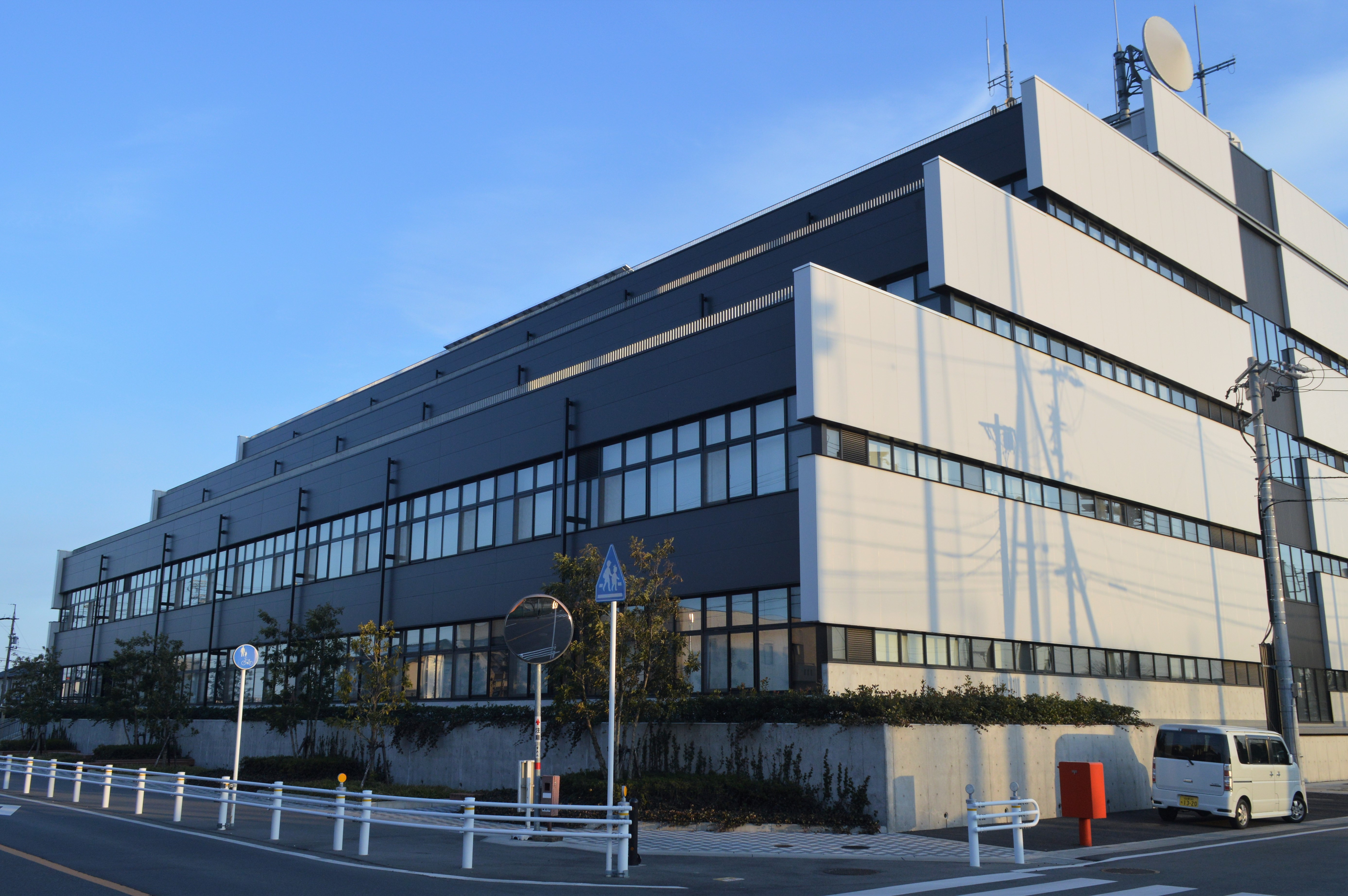
Aisai City hall

Aisai has a mayor-council form of government with a directly elected mayor and a unicameral city legislature of 18 members. The city contributes one member to the Aichi Prefectural Assembly. In terms of national politics, the city is part of Aichi District 8 of the lower house of the Diet of Japan.

== Economy ==
Aisai is noted for its production of edible lotus root. Other main agricultural include ginger, strawberries, tomatoes, and the brewing of sake.

== Education ==
Aisai has twelve public elementary schools and eight public junior high schools operated by the city government, and two public high schools operated by the Aichi Prefectural Board of Education. There are also two private high schools. The prefecture also operates one special education school for the handicapped.

== Transportation ==
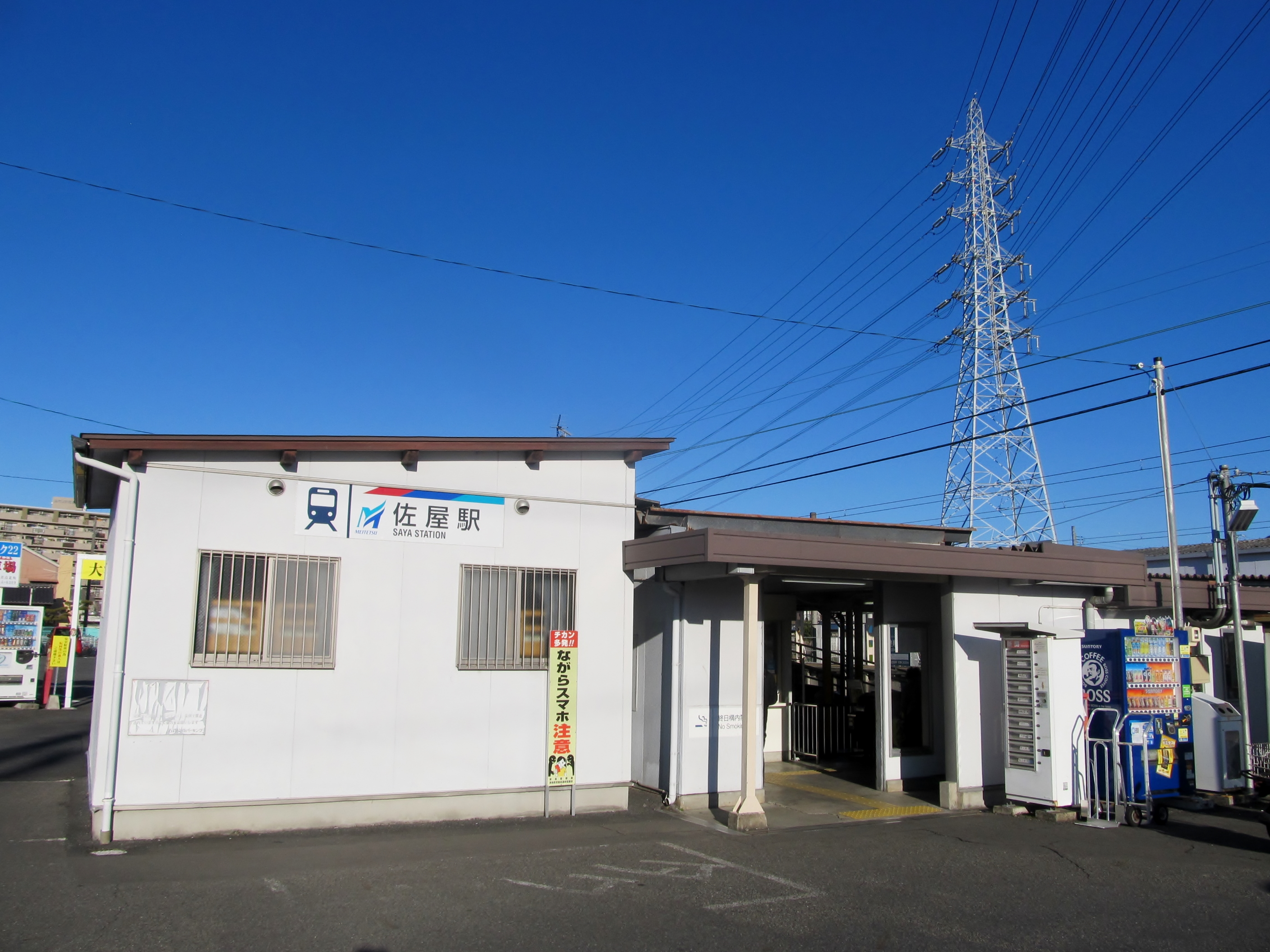
Saya Station

=== Railways ===
==== Conventional lines ====
Central Japan Railway Company

- Kansai Main Line：- Eiwa -

Meitetsu

- Tsushima Line：- Shobata – Fujinami -
- Bisai Line：- Saya – Hibino --(Tsushima)-- Machikata--(Inazawa)--Fuchidaka -

=== Roads ===
==== Expressways ====
- Higashi-Meihan Expressway

==== Japan National Route ====
- National Route 1
- National Route 155

== Local attractions ==
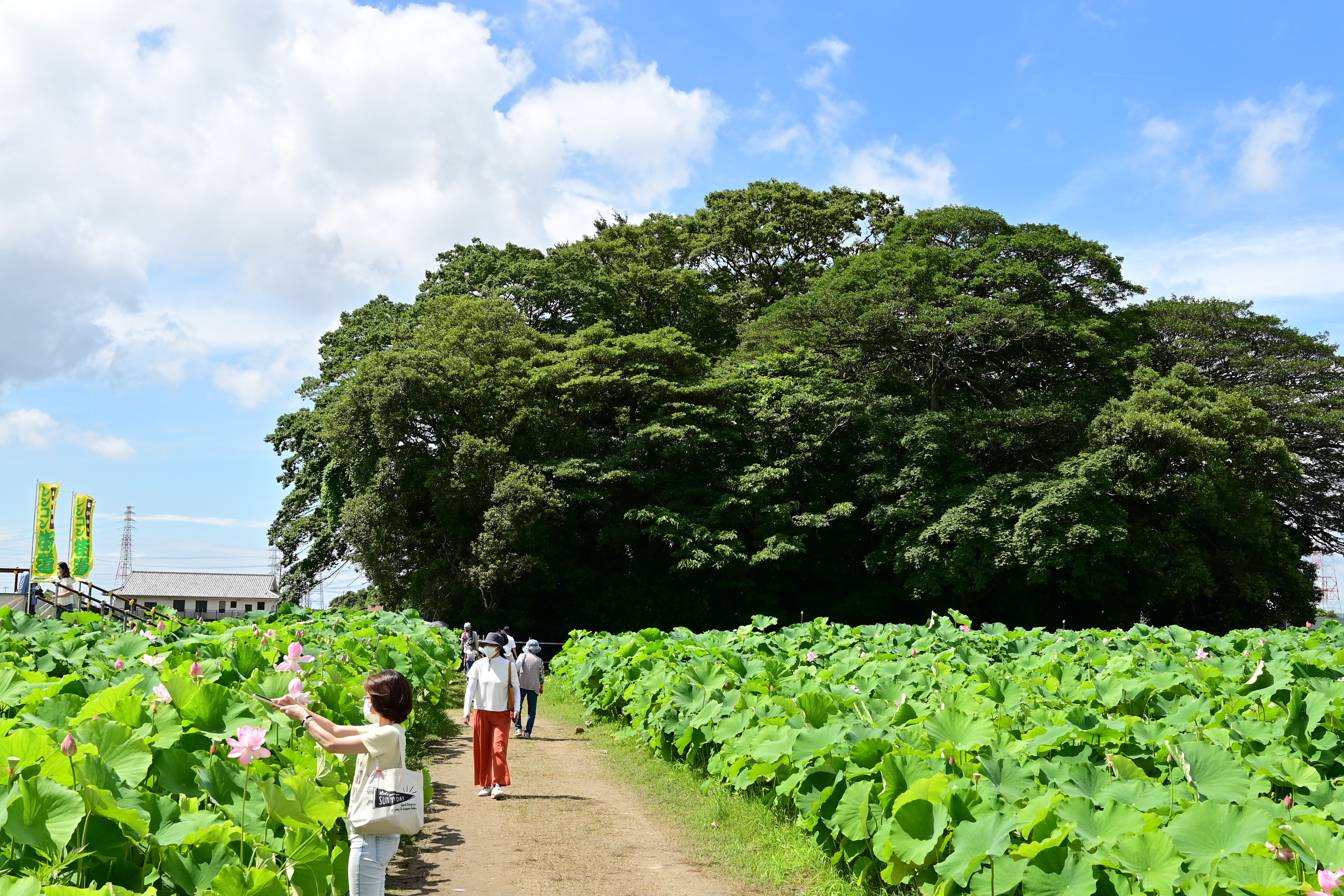
Kokie castle and Morikawa lotus field

- Kokie castle
- Morikawa lotus field

== Notable people from Aisai ==
- Ryoji Kuribayashi, professional baseball pitcher for Hiroshima Toyo Carp and 2021 Central League Rookie of the Year
- Katō Takaaki, pre-war Prime Minister of Japan
- Daiki Wakamatsu, professional soccer player
- Shoichi Yokoi, Imperial Japanese Army holdout found in Guam

== Gallery ==
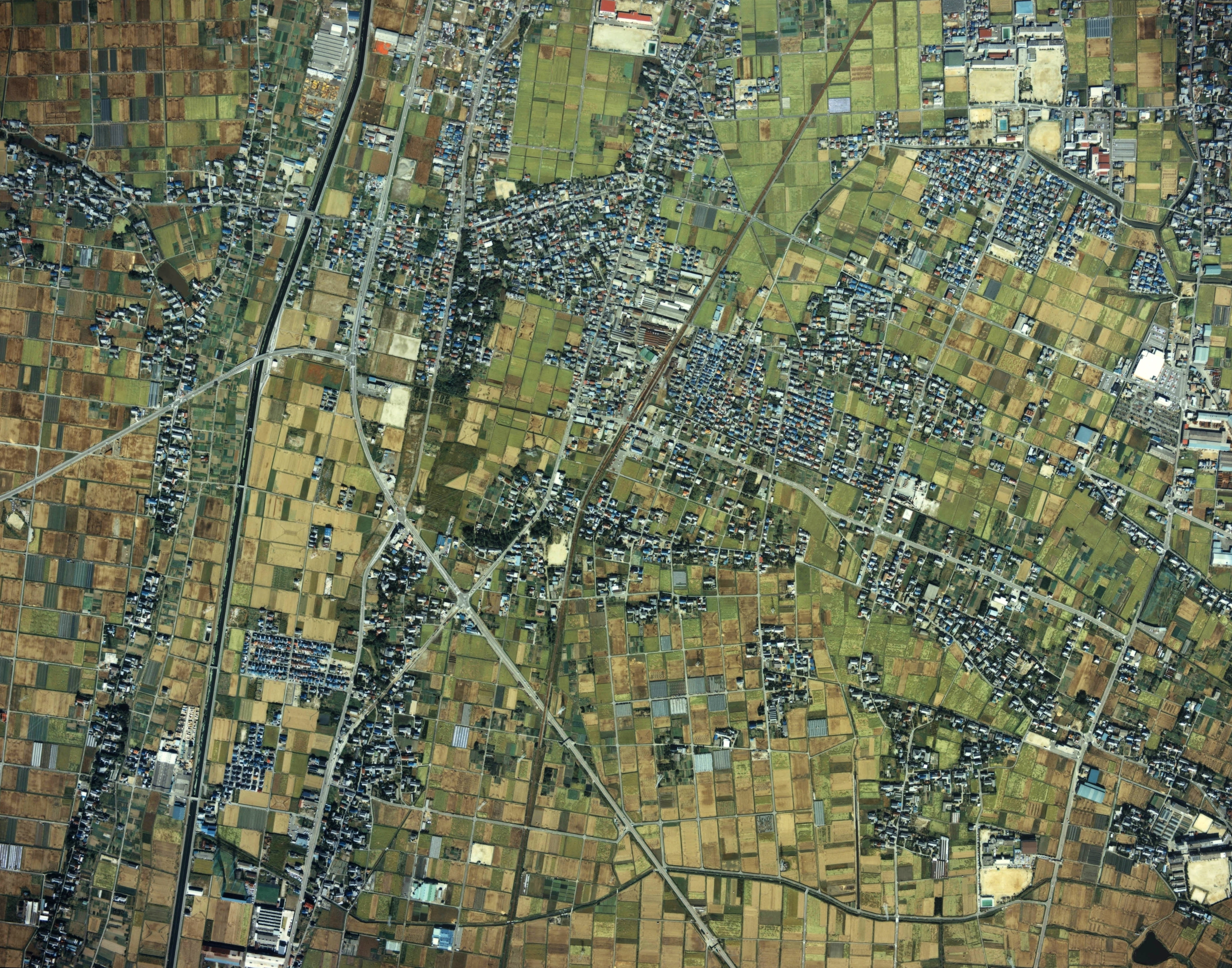
Saya district Aisai city Aerial photograph

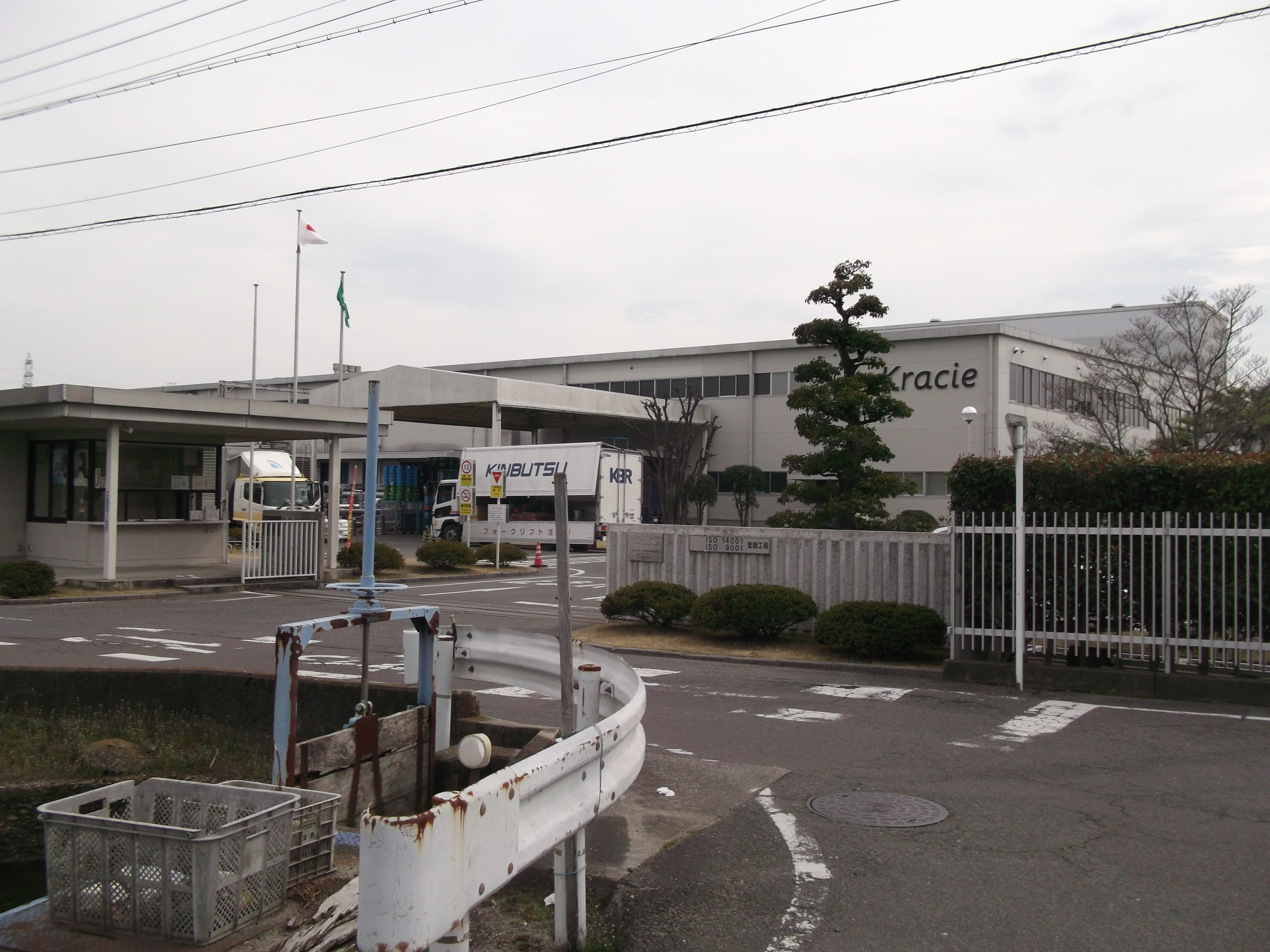
Kracie Tsushima Factory

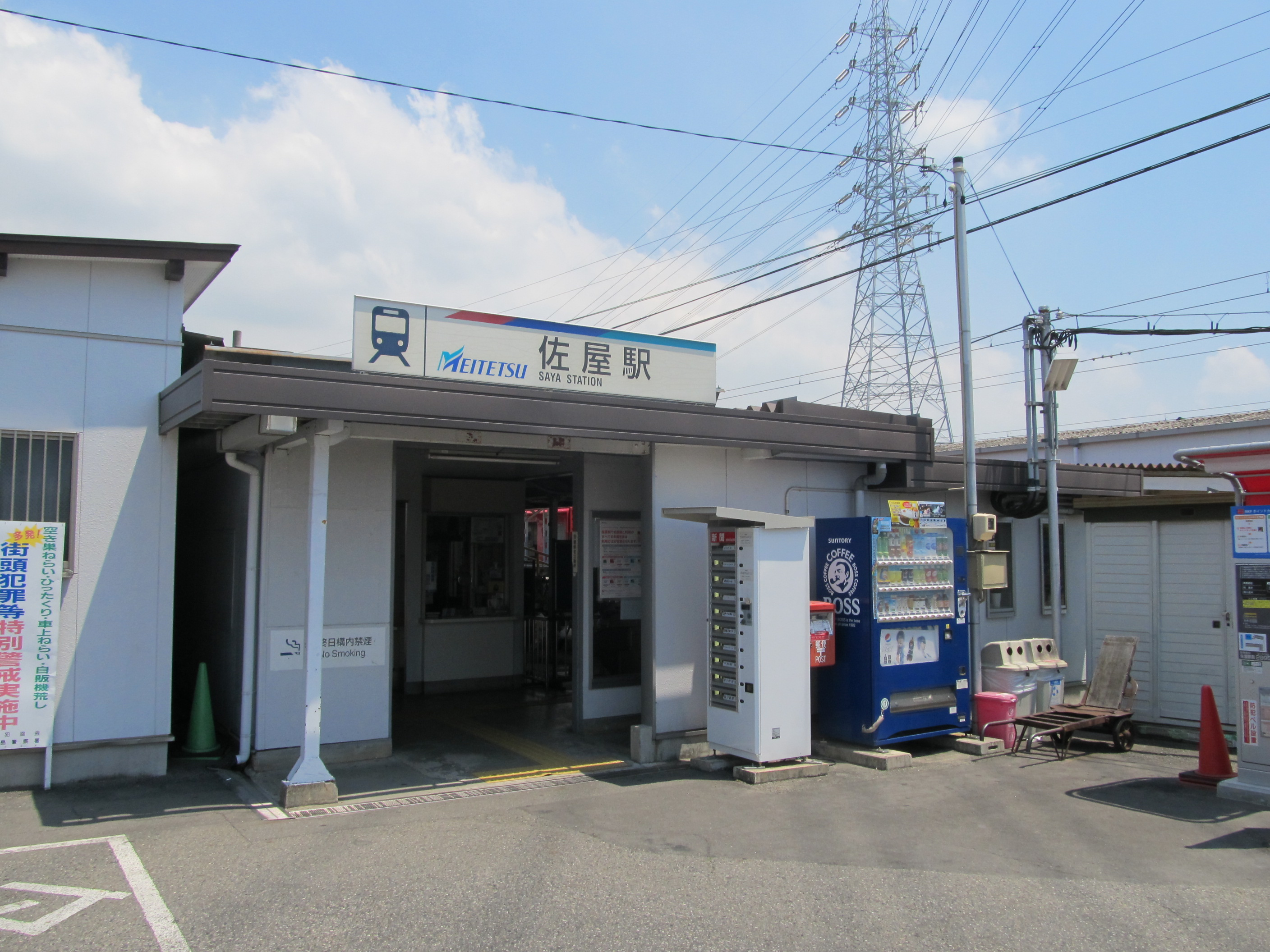
MT-Saya Station-Building

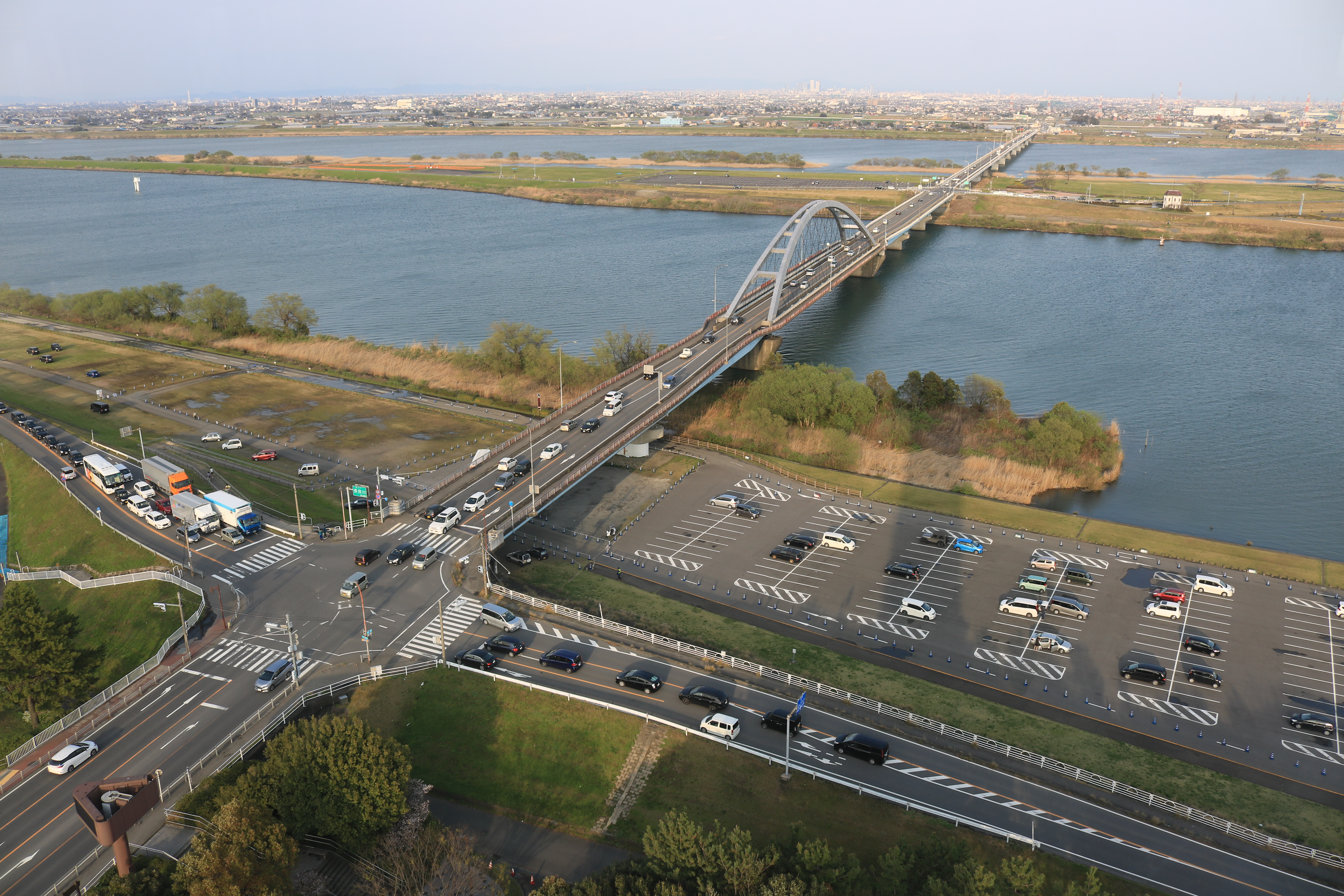
Nagaragawa Bridge and Tatsuta Bridge
