= Saya, Aichi =

Dissolved municipality in Aichi prefecture, Japan

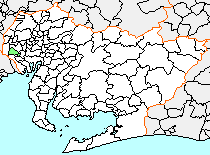
Location of Saya in Aichi Prefecture

Saya (佐屋町, Saya-chō) was a town located in Ama District, Aichi Prefecture, Japan.

== Population ==
As of 2003 the town had an estimated population of 29,875 and a density of 1,601.88 persons per km^{2}. The total area was 18.65 km^{2}.

== History ==
On April 1, 2005, Saya, along with the town of Saori, and the villages of Hachikai and Tatsuta (all from Ama District), was merged to create the city Aisai.
