= Tatsuta, Aichi =

Dissolved municipality in Aichi prefecture, Japan

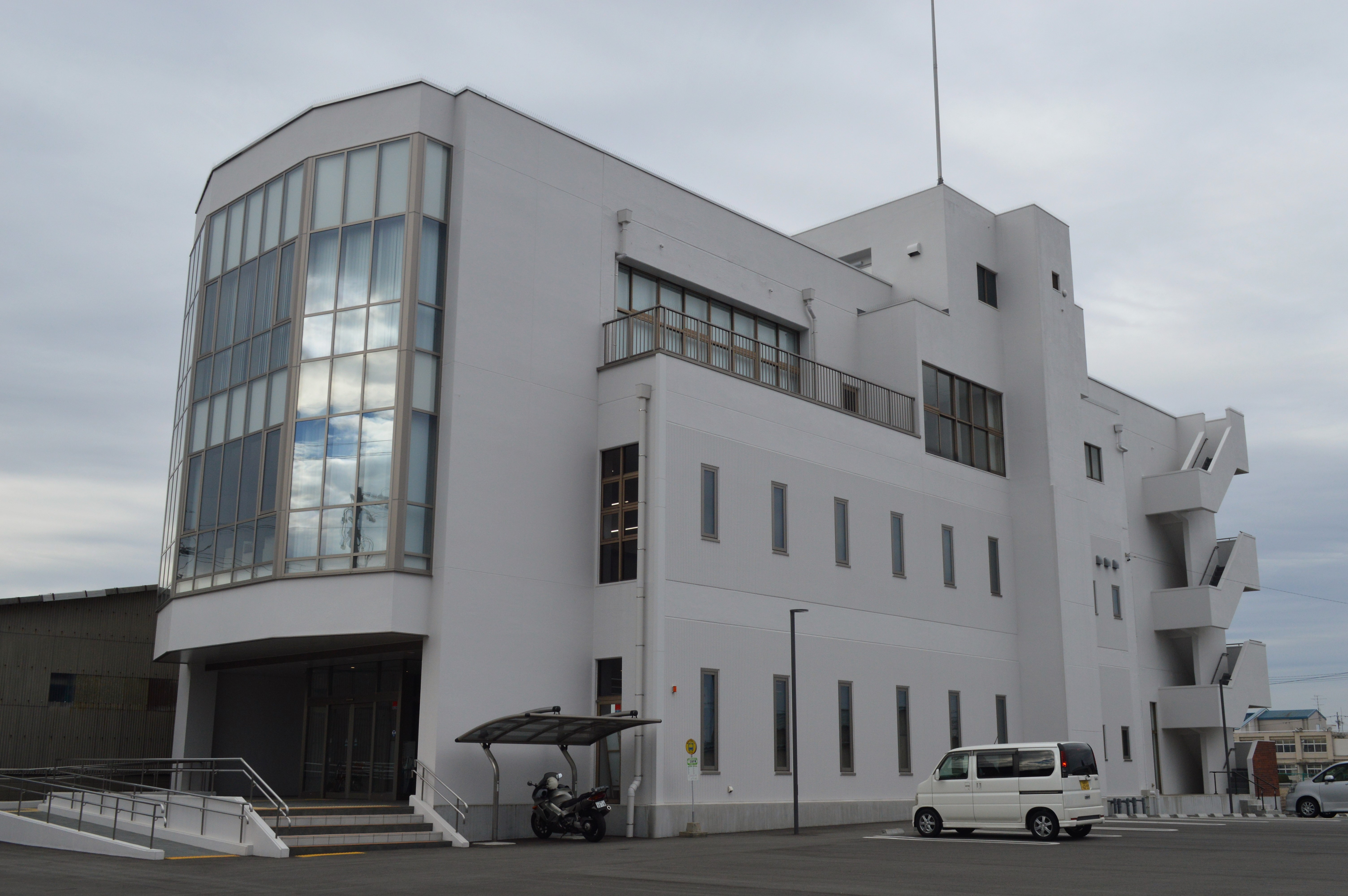
former Tatsuta village hall

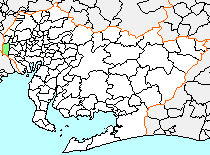
Location of Tatsuta in Aichi Prefecture

Tatsuta (立田村, Tatsuta-mura) was a village located in Ama District, Aichi Prefecture, Japan.

As of 2003, the village had an estimated population of 8,295 and a population density of 336.24 persons per km^{2}. The total land area was 24.67 km^{2}.

On April 1, 2005, Tatsuta, along with the towns of Saya and Saori, and the village of Hachikai (all from Ama District), was merged to create the city Aisai.
