= Tatsuta wajū sluice gates =

Watergate in Yatomi, Aichi, Japan

Coordinates: 35°06′03″N 136°43′36″E

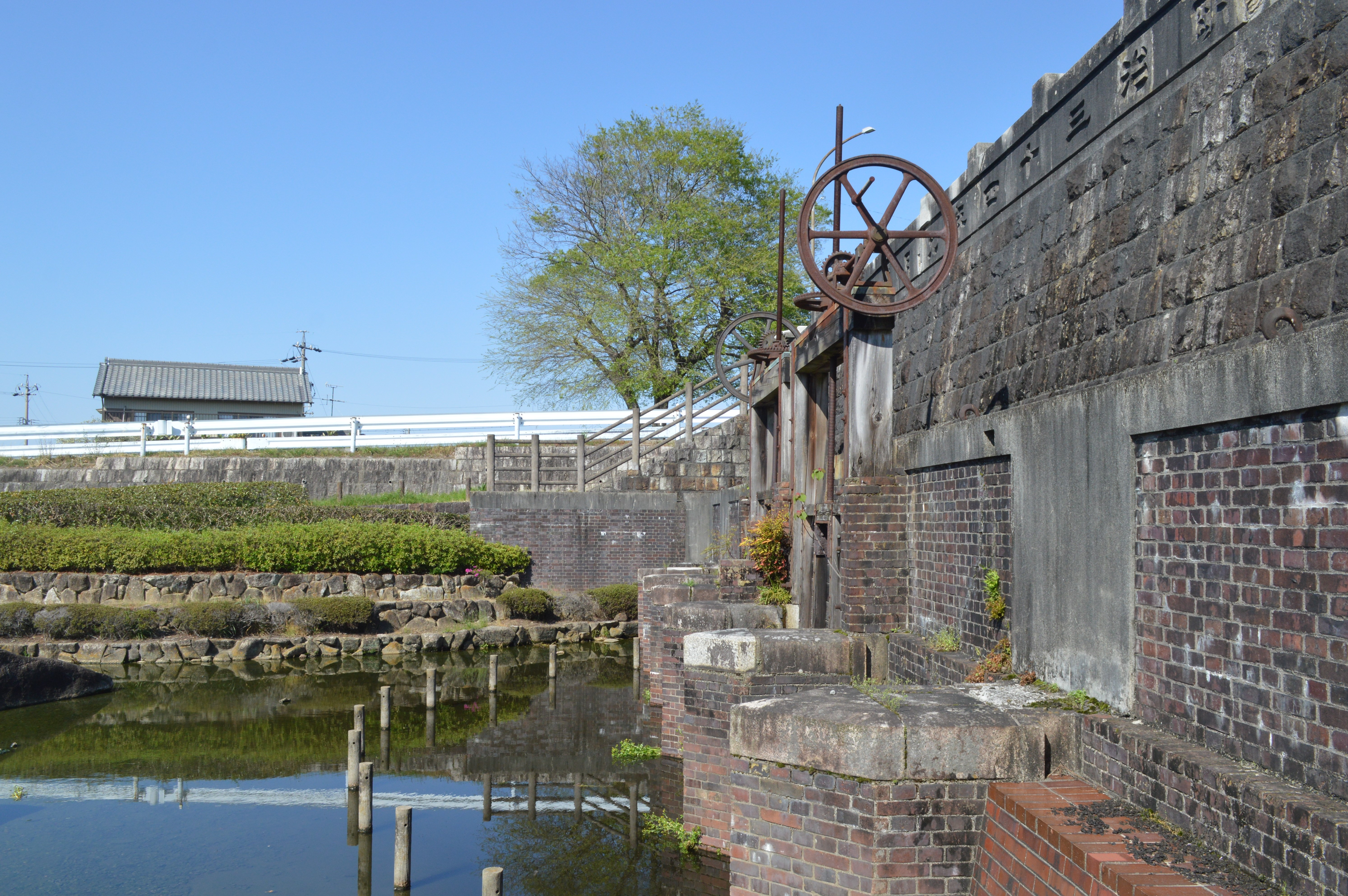
Meiji period sluice gates at Tatsuta wajū

The Tatsuta wajū sluice gates (立田輪中人造堰樋門, Tatsuta-wajū jinzōseki-himon) were constructed in 1902 during works on the Kiso River in Yatomi, Aichi Prefecture, Japan. They are an example of western hydraulic engineering technology adopted during the Meiji period.

== See also ==
- Ishii lock
- Foreign government advisors in Meiji Japan
- Mechanical Engineering Heritage (Japan)
