= Hachikai, Aichi =

Dissolved municipality in Aichi prefecture, Japan

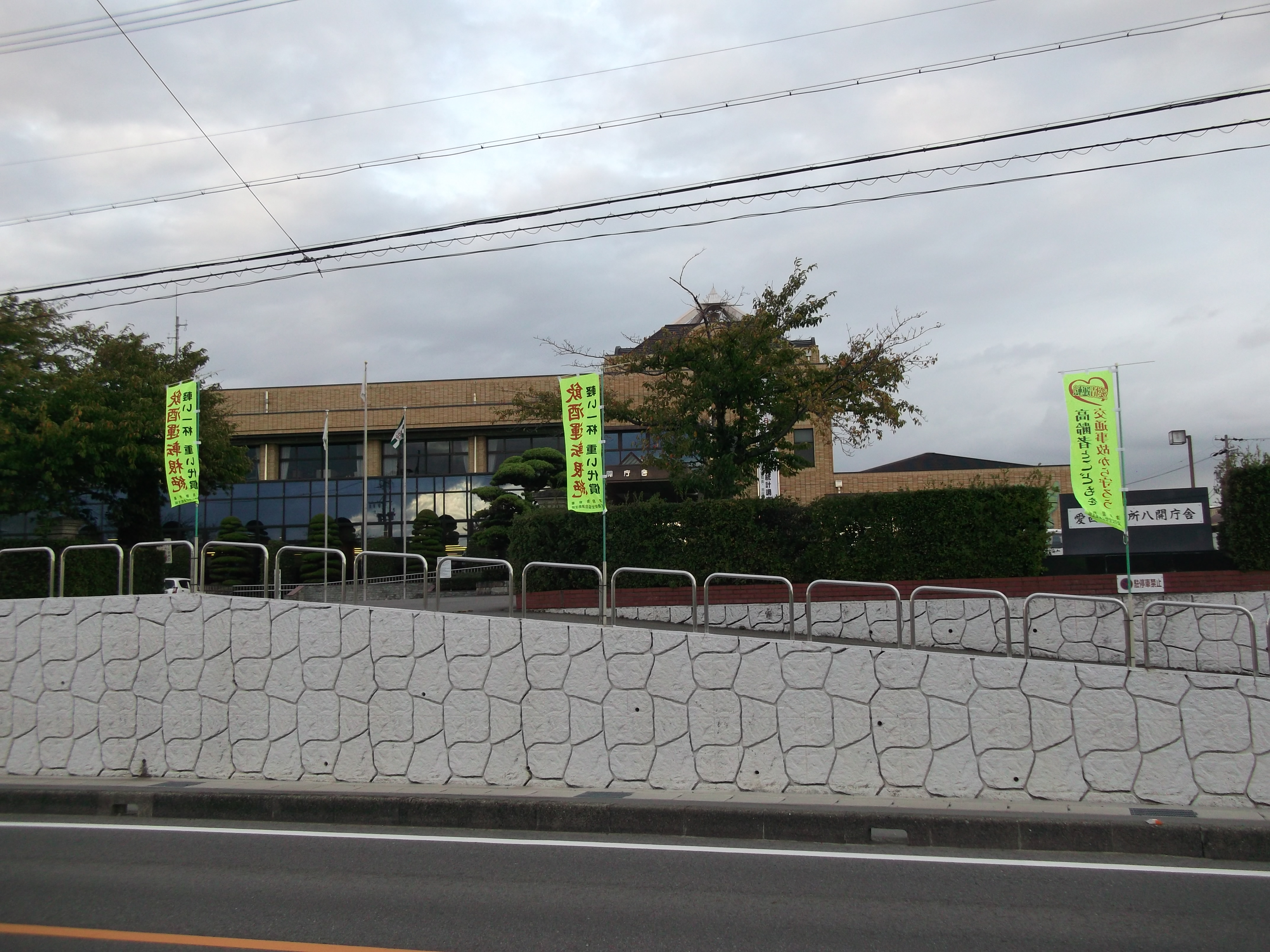
former Hachikai village hall

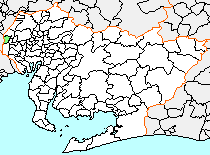
Location of Hachikai in Aichi Prefecture

Hachikai (八開村, Hachikai-mura) was a village located in Ama District, Aichi Prefecture, Japan.

As of 2003, the village had an estimated population of 4,930 and a density of 404.43 persons per km^{2}. The total area was 12.19 km^{2}.

On April 1, 2005, Hachikai, along with the towns of Saya and Saori, and the village of Tatsuta (all from Ama District), was merged to create the city Aisai.
