= Eiwa Station =

Railway station in Aisai, Aichi Prefecture, Japan

CJ04 Eiwa Station 永和駅
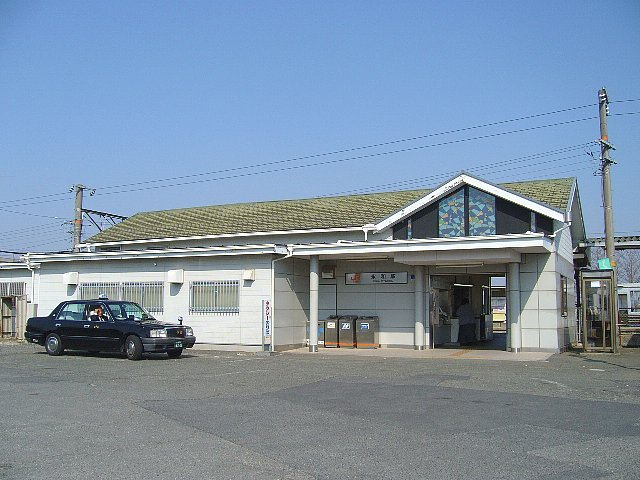
- Eiwa Station in March 2006

General information
- Location: 316-1 Gonishi Onocho, Aisai-shi, Aichi-ken 496-0922; Japan
- Coordinates: 35.1328°N 136.7645°E
- Operator: JR Central
- Line: Kansai Main Line
- Distance: 12.2 kilometers from Nagoya
- Platforms: 2 side platforms

Other information
- Status: Staffed
- Station code: CJ04

History
- Opened: February 1, 1929

Passengers
- FY2017: 2,384 daily
Location
- Location within Aichi Prefecture Location within Japan

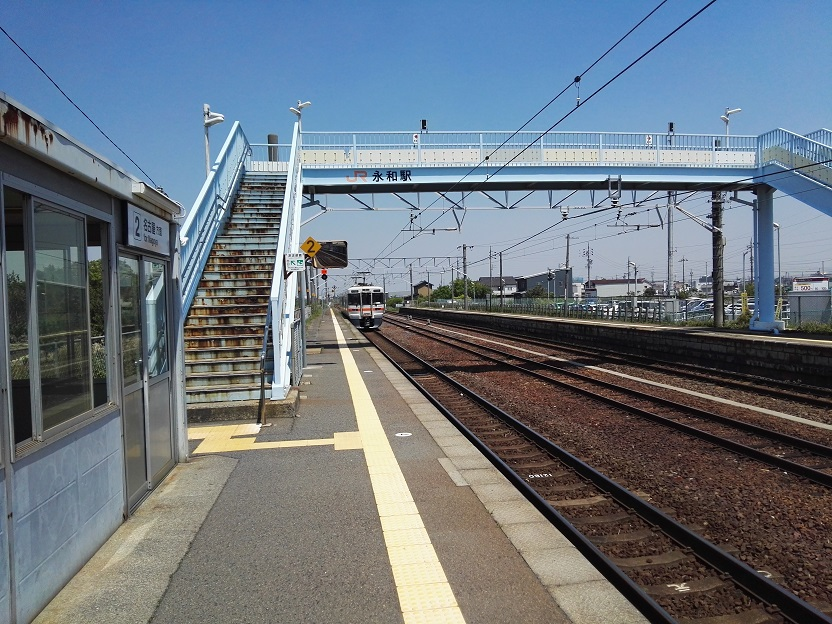
Platform

Eiwa Station (永和駅, Eiwa-eki) is a railway station in the city of Aisai, Aichi Prefecture, Japan, operated by Central Japan Railway Company (JR Tōkai).

== Lines ==
Eiwa Station is served by the Kansai Main Line, and is located 12.2 kilometers from the starting point of the line at Nagoya Station.

== Station layout ==
The station has two opposed side platforms, with platform 1 adjacent to the station building. The platforms are connected by an uncovered footbridge. Three rail lines pass between the platforms, with the middle, non-electrified line used for freight traffic. The station is staffed.

=== Platforms ===
1	■ Kansai Main Line	for Kuwana, Yokkaichi, Kameyama
2	■ Kansai Main Line	for Nagoya

== Adjacent stations ==
«	Service	»
Central Japan Railway Company (JR Tōkai)
Kansai Main Line
Semi Rapid: Does not stop at this station
Rapid: Does not stop at this station
Rapid "Mie": Does not stop at this station
Limited Express "Nanki": Does not stop at this station
Kanie	Local	Yatomi

== Station history ==
The Danta Signal Stop (善太信号場, Danta-shingojo) was established on the Japanese Government Railways (JGR) Kansai Line on June 1, 1927. This was elevated to become Eiwa Station on February 1, 1929. The JGR became the JNR(Japan National Railways) after World War II. Freight operations were discontinued from October 15, 1950. With the privatization of the JNR on April 1, 1987, the station came under the control of JR Central. Automatic ticket gates using the TOICA smart card were installed from November 25, 2006.

Station numbering was introduced to the section of the Kansai Main Line operated JR Central in March 2018; Eiwa Station was assigned station number CI04.

== Passenger statistics ==
In fiscal 2017, the station was used by an average of 2,384 passengers daily (boarding passengers only).

== Surrounding area ==
- Eiwa Elementary School

== See also ==
- List of railway stations in Japan
