= Saori, Aichi =

Dissolved municipality in Aichi prefecture, Japan

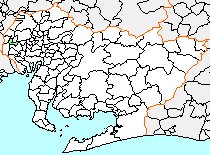
Location of Saori in Aichi Prefecture

Saori (佐織町, Saori-chō) was a town located in Ama District, Aichi Prefecture, Japan.

== Population ==
As of 2004, the town had an estimated population of 23,345 and a density of 2,099.37 persons per km^{2}. The total area was 11.12 km^{2}.

== History ==
On April 1, 2005, Saori was merged with the town of Saya, and the villages of Hachikai and Tatsuta (all from Ama District), was merged to create the city Aisai.
