= Yatomi =

Yatomi 弥富市
- City
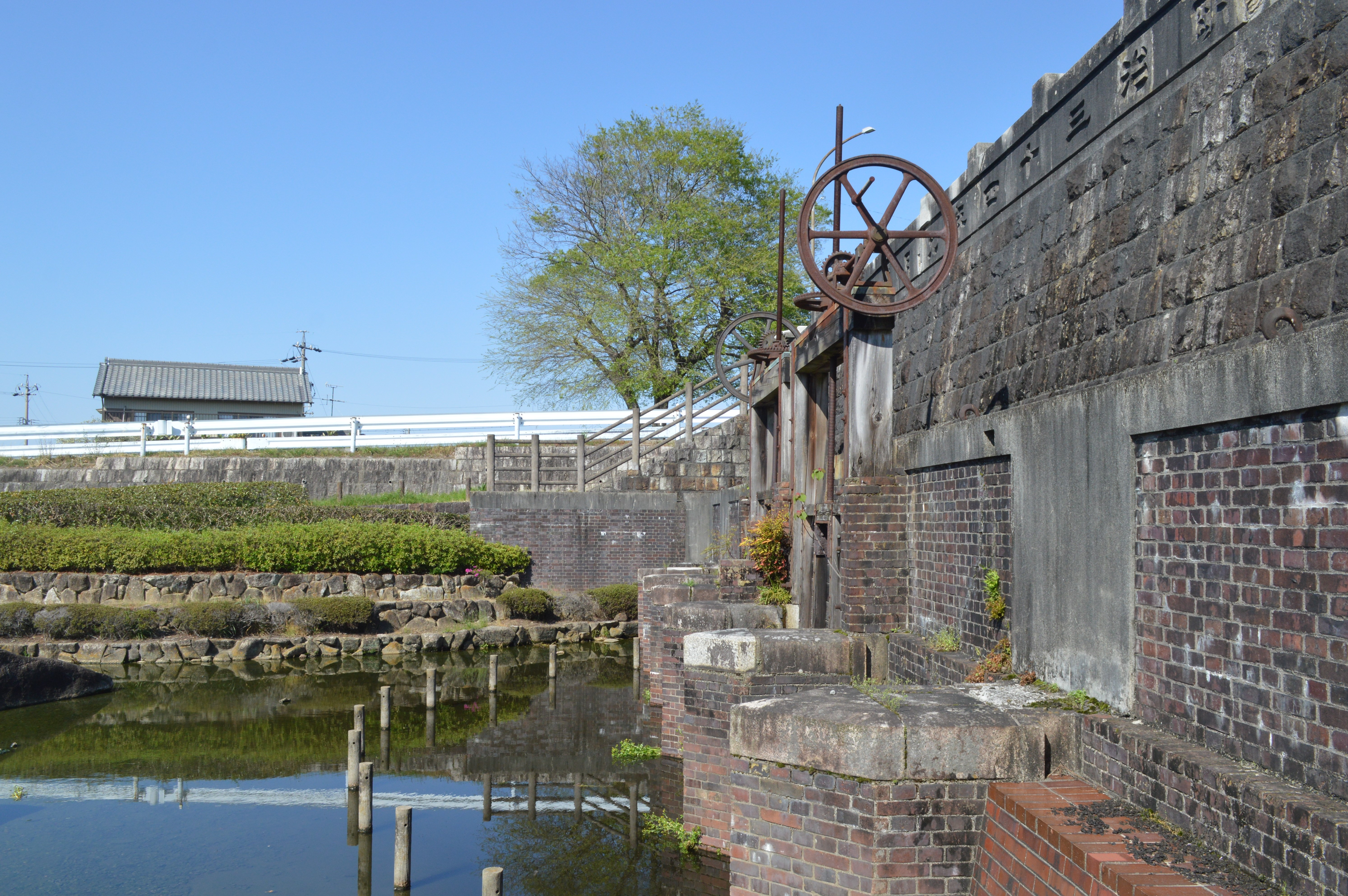
- Tatsuta polder sluice gates

- Flag Seal

- Location of Yatomi in Aichi Prefecture

- Coordinates: 35°7′N 136°43′E
- Country: Japan
- Region: Chūbu (Tōkai)
- Prefecture: Aichi

Area
  - Total: 49.00 km^{2} (18.92 sq mi)

Population (December 1, 2019)
  - Total: 44,589
  - Density: 910.0/km^{2} (2,357/sq mi)
- Time zone: UTC+9 (Japan Standard Time)
- Tree: Sakura
- Flower: Antirrhinum majus
- Phone number: 0567-65-1111
- Address: Minamihonda 335, Maesu-cho, Yatomi-shi, Aichi-ken 498-8501
- Website: Official website

Yatomi (弥富市, Yatomi-shi) is a city located in Aichi Prefecture, Japan. As of December 1, 2019, the city had an estimated population of 44,589 in 18,185 households and a population density of 910 persons per km^{2}. The total area of the city is 49.0 square kilometres (18.9 sq mi). The between of the border, and neighboring town of Kanie.

== Geography ==
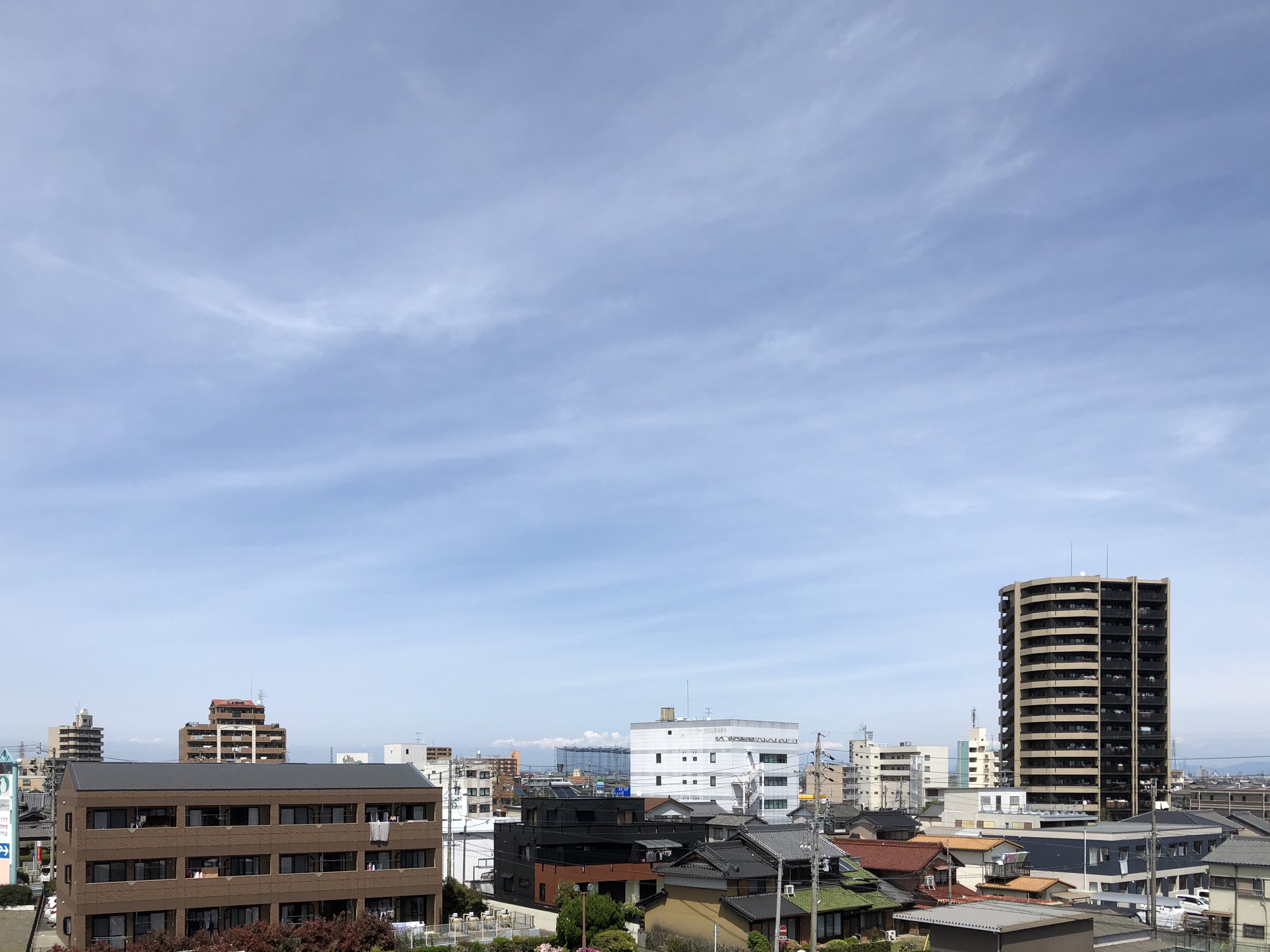
Yatomi Skyline

Yatomi is located in the coastal flatlands of far western Aichi Prefecture, bordering Mie Prefecture on the west. It has a short coastline with Mikawa Bay on the Pacific Ocean to the southeast.

=== Climate ===
The city has a climate characterized by hot and humid summers, and relatively mild winters (Köppen climate classification Cfa). The average annual temperature in Yatomi is 15.6 °C. The average annual rainfall is 1677 mm with September as the wettest month. The temperatures are highest on average in August, at around 27.7 °C, and lowest in January, at around 4.5 °C.

=== Demographics ===
Per Japanese census data, the population of Yatomi has grown steadily over the past 60 years.

Historical population
Year	Pop.	±%
1960	20,440	—
1970	27,311	+33.6%
1980	36,457	+33.5%
1990	38,971	+6.9%
2000	42,175	+8.2%
2010	43,280	+2.6%

=== Surrounding municipalities ===
Aichi Prefecture

- Aisai
- Kanie
- Tobishima

Mie Prefecture

- Kuwana
- Kisosaki

== History ==
=== Middle ages ===
The area name of Yatomi appears in Kamakura period documents, as part of ancient Owari Province.

=== Early modern period ===
During the Edo period, the area was noted for raising ornamental goldfish.

=== Late modern period ===
During the Meiji period, the area was organized into villages under Kasai District, Aichi Prefecture, with the establishment of the modern municipalities system. Kasai District later became Ama District, Aichi. Yatomi was proclaimed a town on August 26, 1903.

=== Contemporary history ===
The Isewan Typhoon of September 26, 1959, created extensive damage to the area. Efforts to merge Yatomi with the neighboring town of Kanie failed in 2004 over a dispute on the naming of the new entity.

The city of Yatomi was founded on April 1, 2006, from the merger between the former town of Yatomi, absorbing the village of Jūshiyama (both from Ama District).

== Government ==
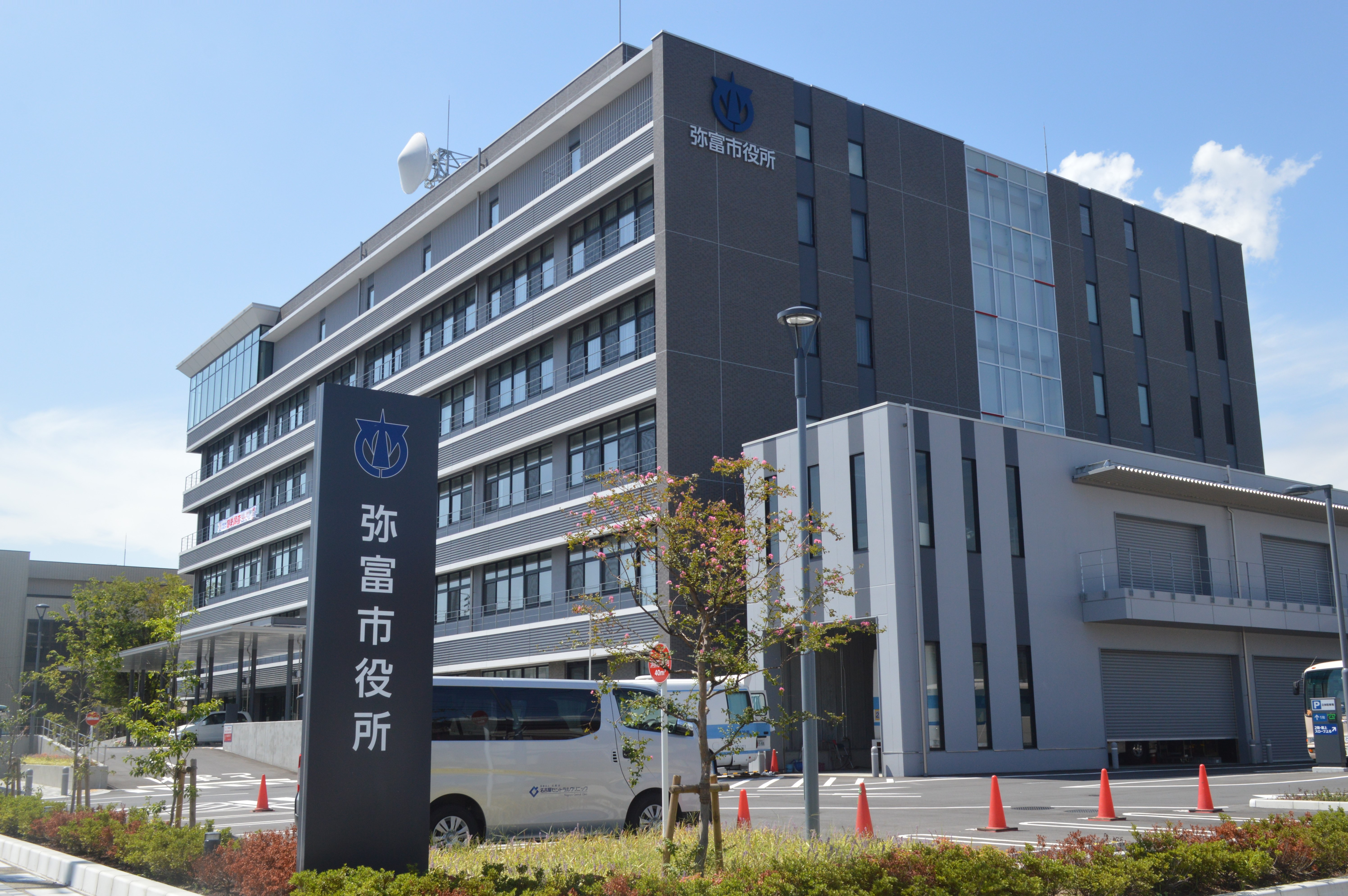
Yatomi City hall

Yatomi has a mayor-council form of government with a directly elected mayor and a unicameral city legislature of 16 members. The city contributes two members to the Aichi Prefectural Assembly. In terms of national politics, the city is part of Aichi District 9 of the lower house of the Diet of Japan.

== Sister cities ==
- Urayasu, Chiba Prefecture, disaster alliance city since September 27, 2012

== Education ==
=== Schools ===
Yatomi has eight public elementary schools and three public junior high schools operated by the city government, and one public high school operated by the Aichi Prefectural Board of Education. There is also one private high school.

== Economy ==
Yatomi is a regional commercial center, and is noted for hothouse agriculture. Main agricultural products include rice, wheat, lettuce, tomatoes, and carnations.

== Transportation ==
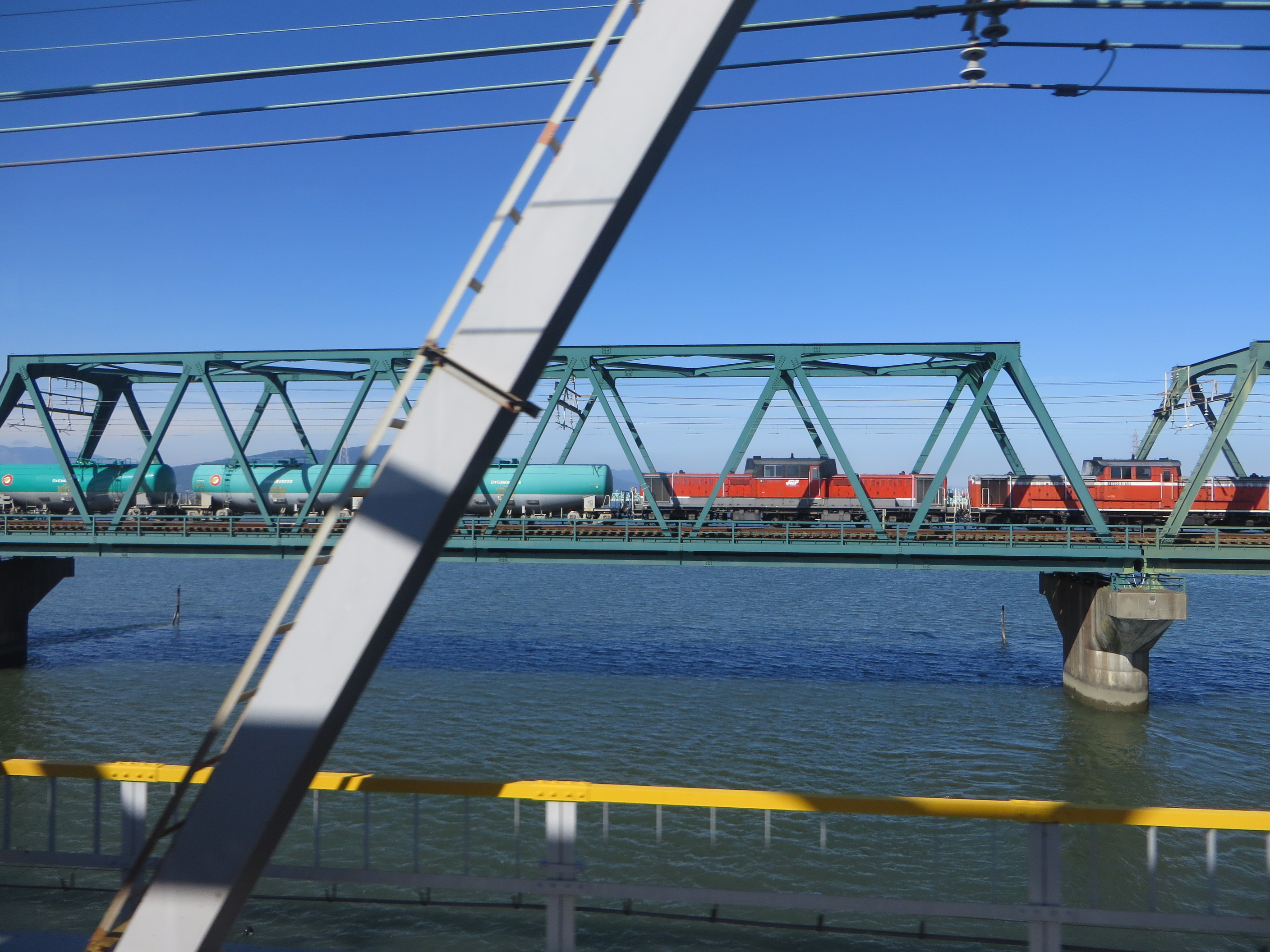
Owari Bridge R1

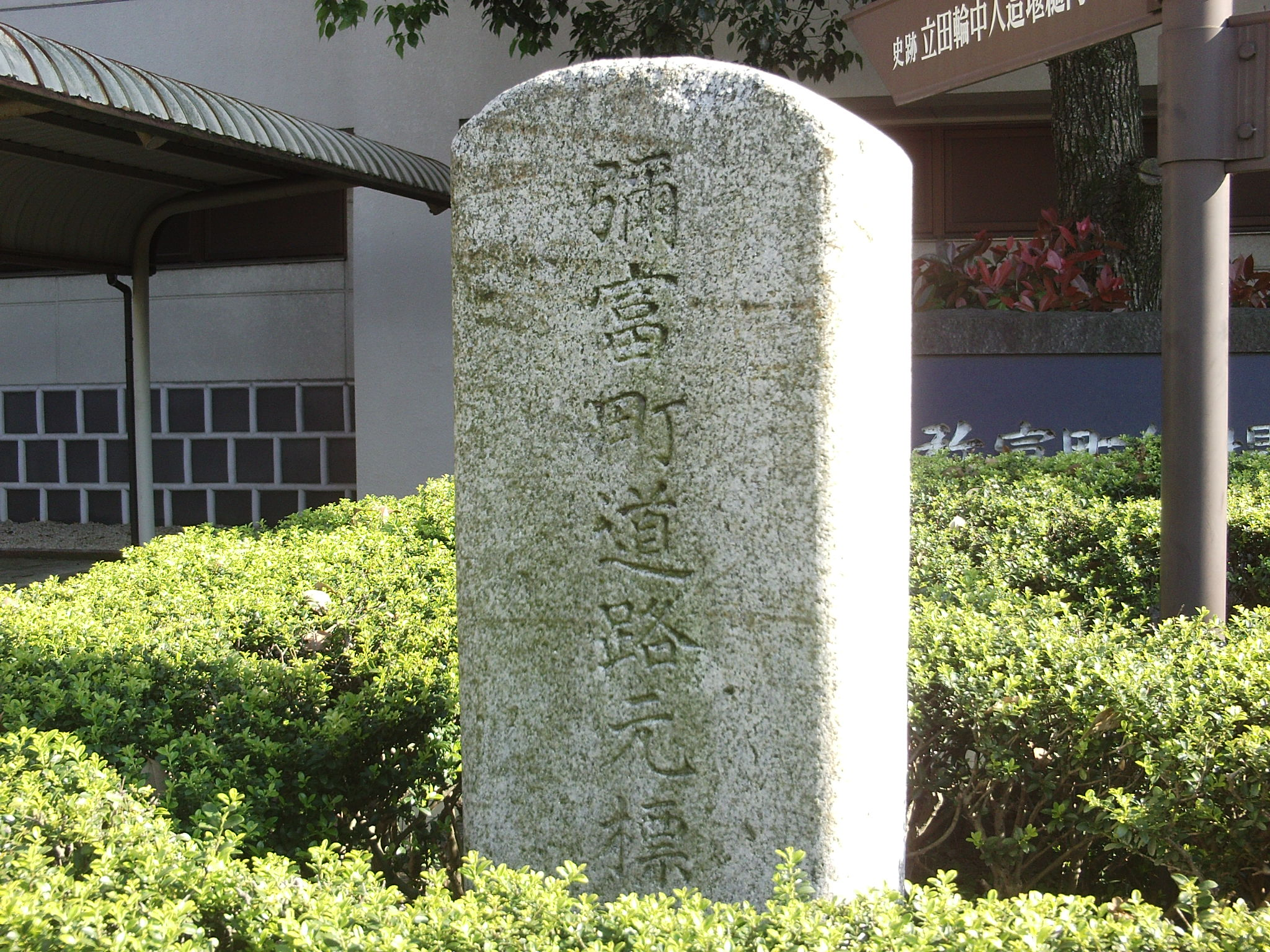
The Kilometre Zero of Yatomi

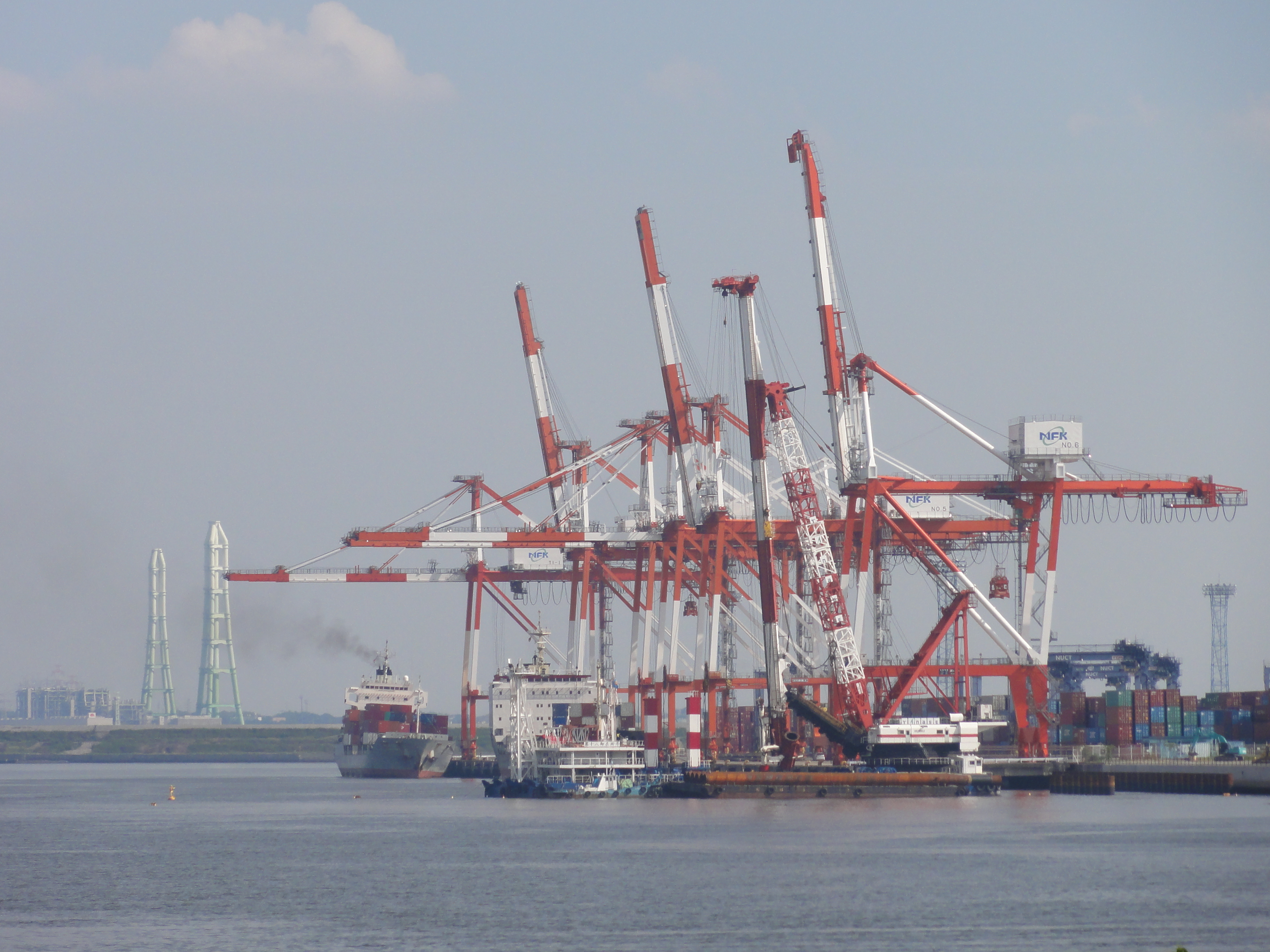
Nabeta wharf in Port of Nagoya

=== Railways ===
==== Conventional lines ====
Central Japan Railway Company

- Kansai Main Line: - Yatomi -

Kintetsu

- Nagoya Line: - Kintetsu-Yatomi - Sakogi

Meitetsu

- Bisai Line: Yatomi – Gonosan -

=== Roads ===
==== Expressways ====
- Higashi-Meihan Expressway
- Isewangan Expressway

==== Japan National Route ====
- National Route 1
- National Route 23
- National Route 155

=== Seaways ===
==== Seaport ====
- Port of Nagoya
  - Nabeta wharf
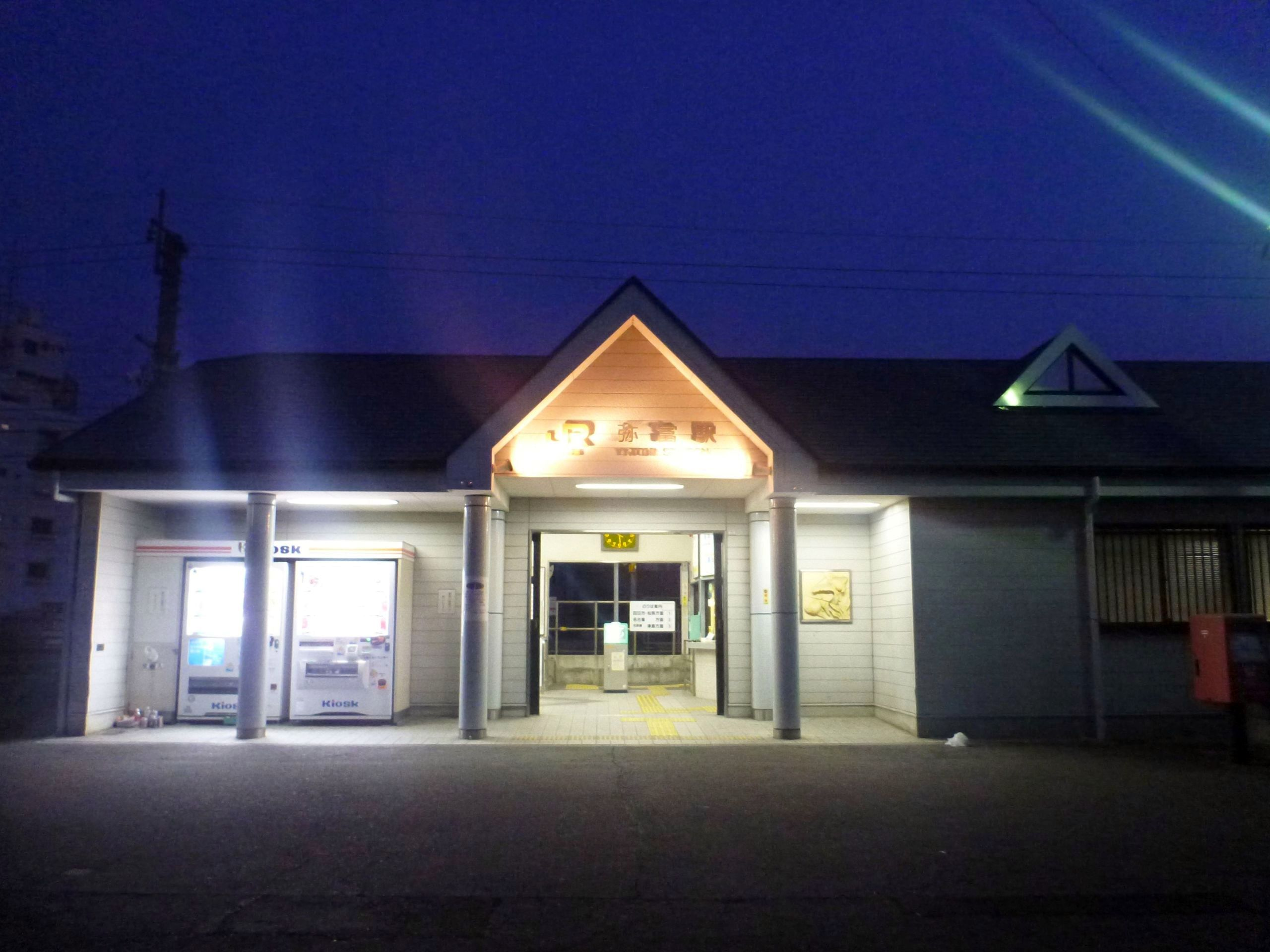
Yatomi Station

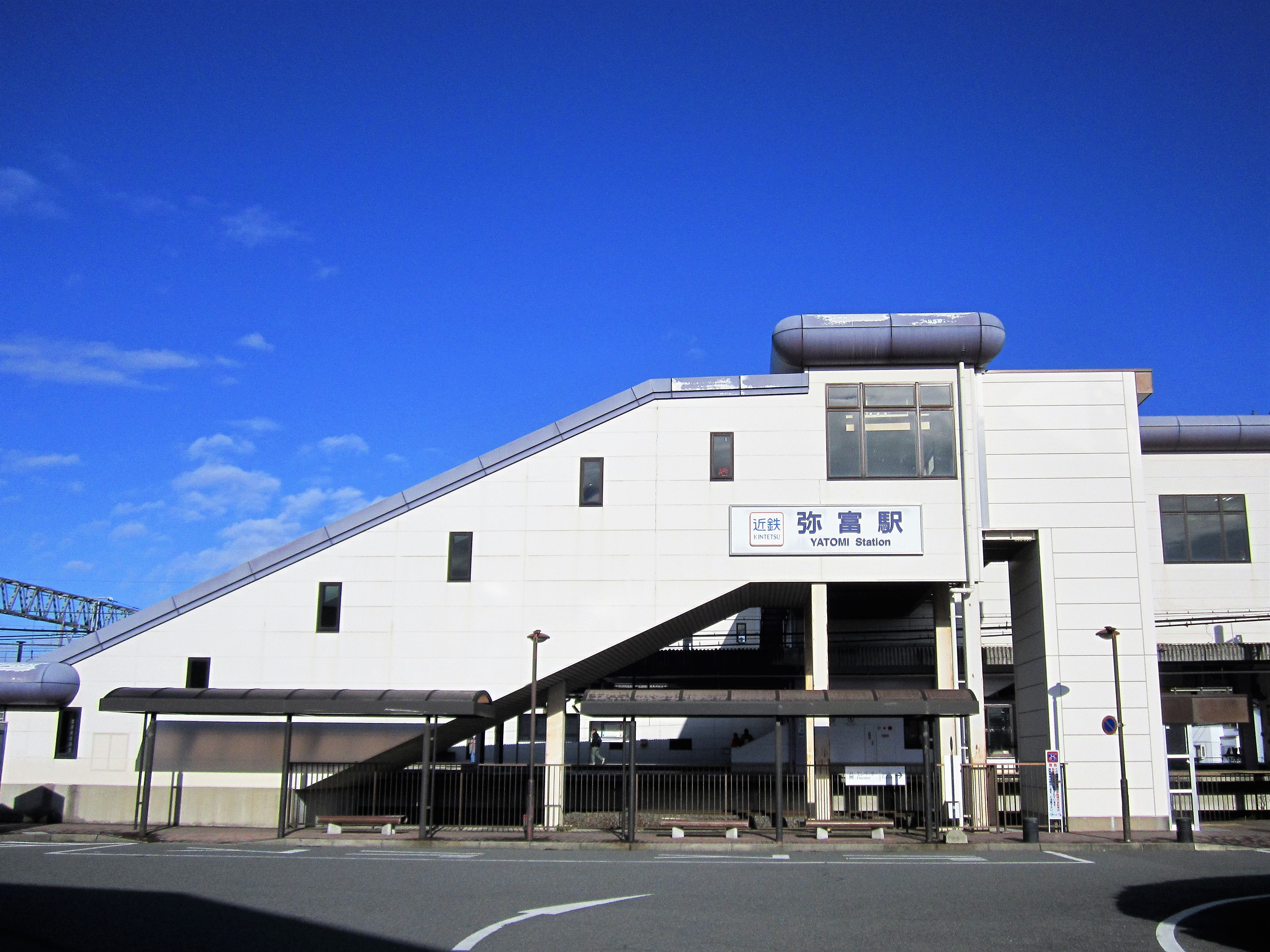
Kintetsu-Yatomi Station

== Notable people from Yatomi ==
- Ōnishiki Daigorō, Sumo Wrestler
- Umanosuke Ueda, professional wrestler and sports commentator

== Local attractions ==
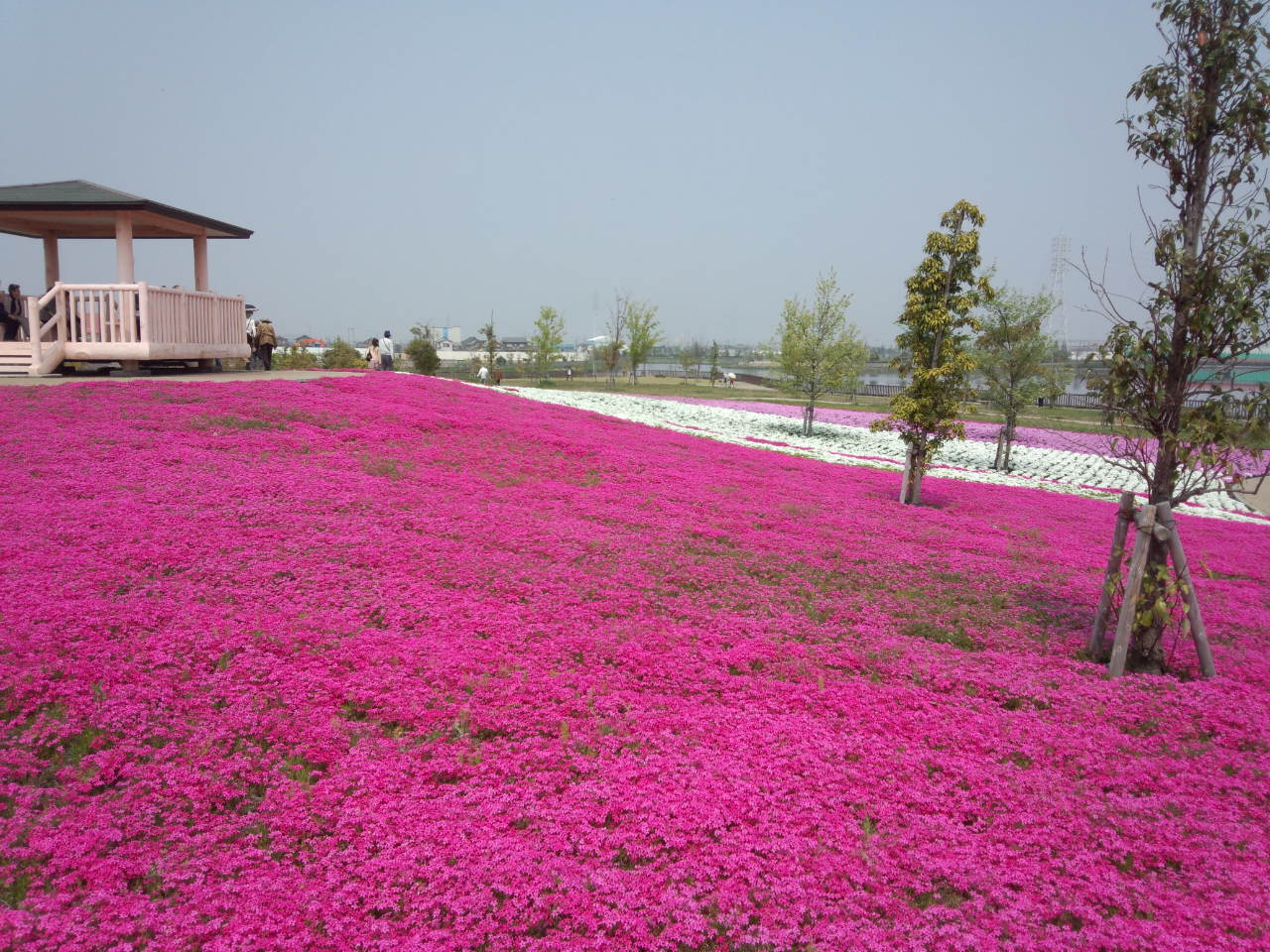
Mitsumata-pond park

- Nagoya Racecourse

=== Parks ===
- Mitsumata-pond park
- Tatsuta polder sluice gates
- Yatomi Wild Bird Sanctuary
