= Ama District =

District located in Aichi Prefecture, Japan

Coordinates: 35.094858°N 136.793633°E

Map of Ama District in Aichi Prefecture

Ama (海部郡, Ama-gun) is a district located in Aichi Prefecture, Japan.

As of October 1, 2019, the district has an estimated population of 74,009 with a density of 1,846 persons per km^{2}. The total area is 40.09 km^{2}.

== Municipalities ==
The district consists of two towns and one village:

- Kanie (Note: Classified as a town.)
- Ōharu
- Tobishima (Note: Classified as a village.)

== History ==
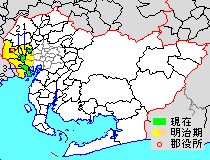
Map showing original extent of Ama District in Aichi Prefecture: * yellow - areas formerly within the district borders during the early Meiji period: 1. Ōharu-machi; 2. Kanie-machi; 3. Tobishima-mura

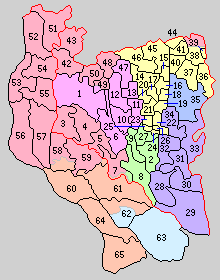
Colored areas are in this district.

=== Recent mergers ===
- On April 1, 2005 - The towns of Saya and Saori, and the villages of Hachikai and Tatsuta were merged into the expanded city of Aisai.
- On April 1, 2006 - The former town of Yatomi absorbed the village of Jūshiyama to form the city of Yatomi.
- On March 22, 2010 - The towns of Shippō, Jimokuji and Miwa were merged to form the city of Ama.
