= Jūshiyama =

Dissolved municipality in Aichi prefecture, Japan

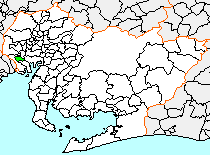
Jūshiyama in Aichi Prefecture

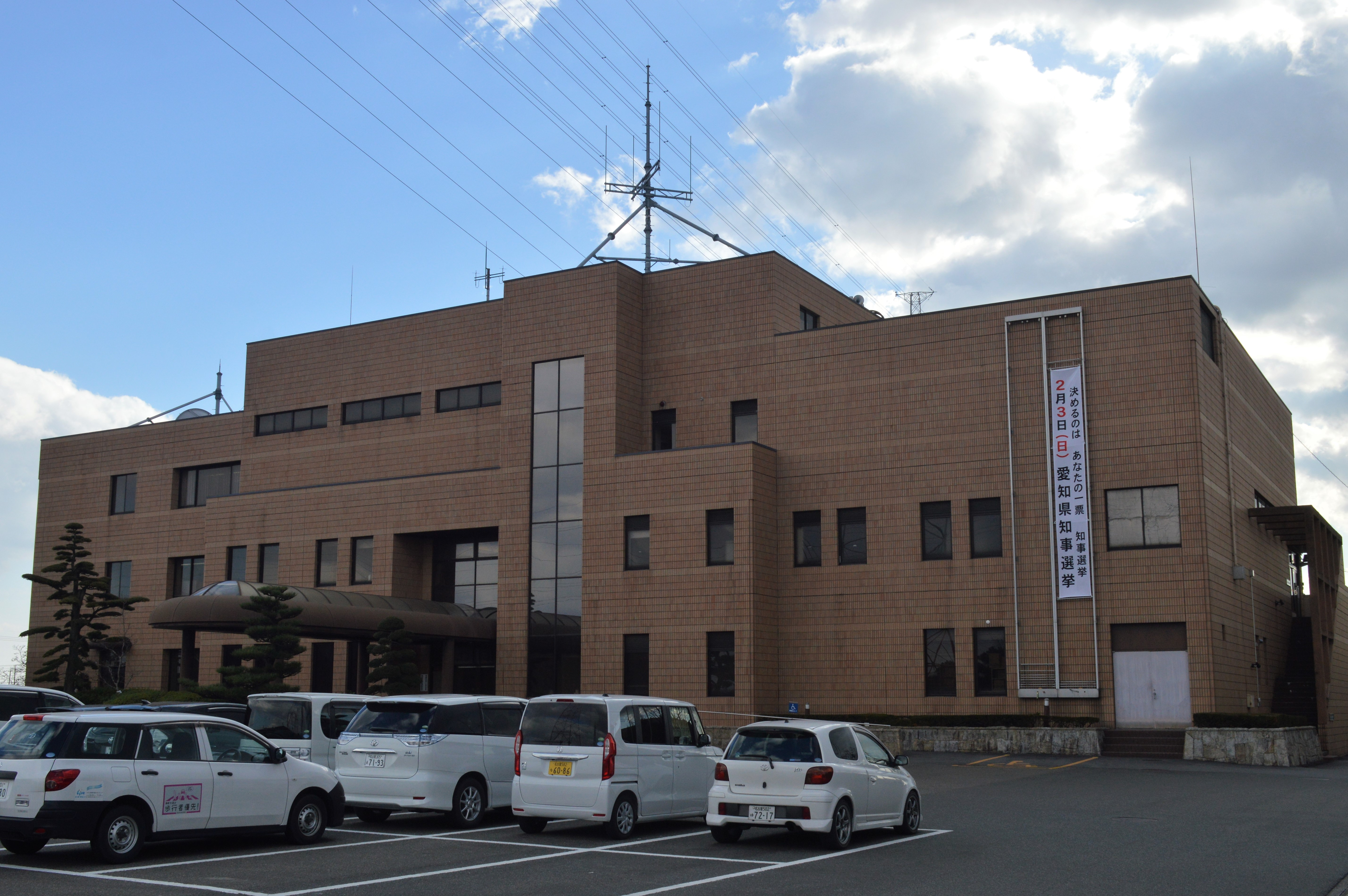
former Jūshiyama Village Hall

Jūshiyama (十四山村, Jūshiyama-mura) was a village located in Ama District, Aichi Prefecture, Japan.

As of 2003, the village had an estimated population of 5,687 and a density of 570.41 persons per km^{2}. The total area was 9.97 km^{2}.

On April 1, 2006, Jūshiyama was merged into the former town of Yatomi to create the city of Yatomi.
