= Haruta Station =

Railway station in Nagoya, Japan

Coordinates: 35.1433°N 136.8133°E

CJ02 Haruta Station 春田駅
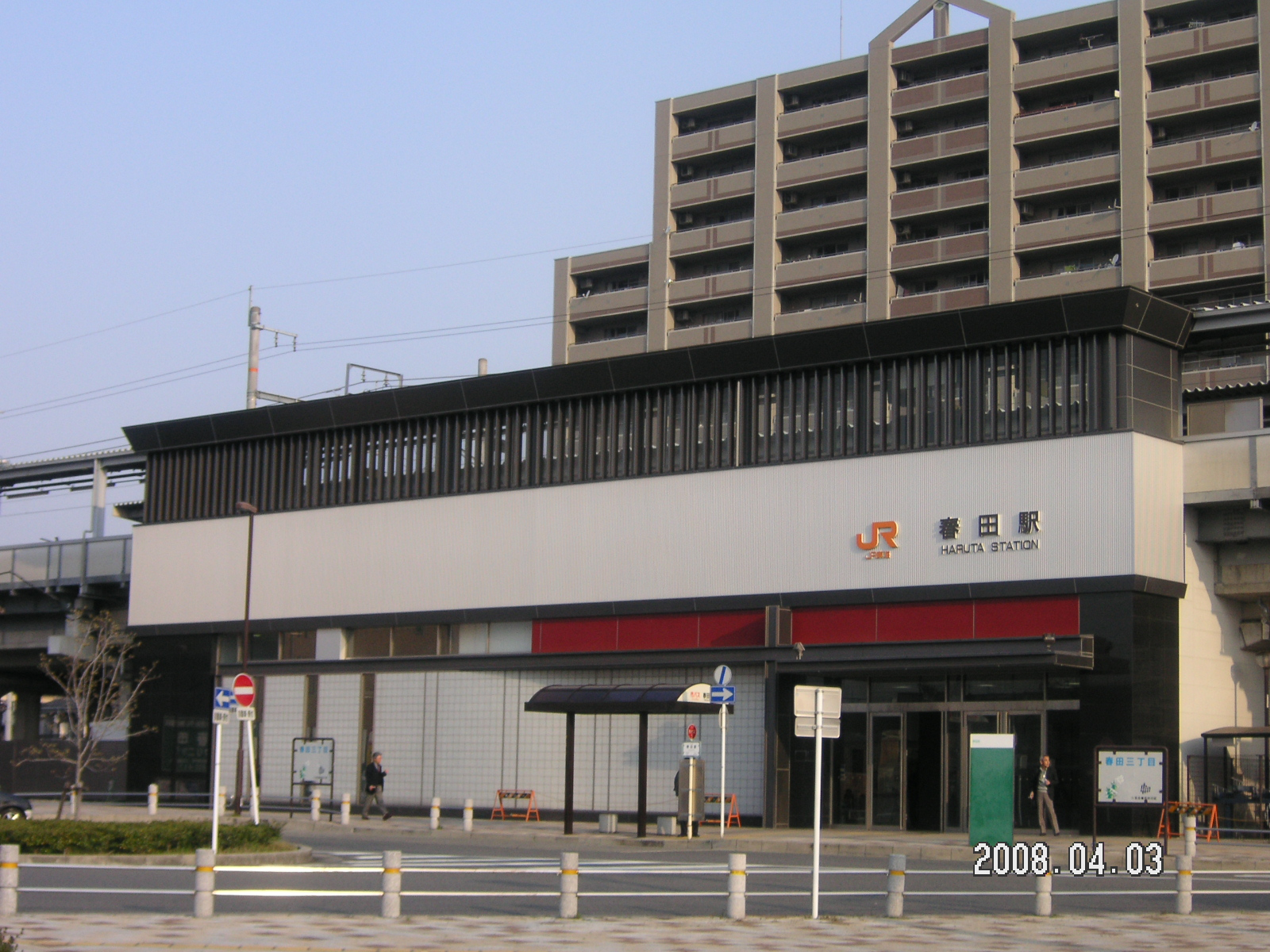
- Haruta Station

General information
- Location: 92-2 HAruta 2-chome, Nakagawa, Nagoya, Aichi （愛知県名古屋市中川区春田二丁目92-2） Japan
- Operator: JR Central
- Line: Kansai Main Line
- Platforms: 2 side platforms
- Tracks: 2

Construction
- Structure type: Elevated

History
- Opened: 3 March 2001; 25 years ago

Passengers
- 2011: 3299 daily
Location

Haruta Station (春田駅, Haruta-eki) is a railway station in Nakagawa-ku, Nagoya, Aichi Prefecture, Japan. It is located 7.5 rail kilometres from the terminus of the Kansai Line at Nagoya Station.

== Lines ==
- Central Japan Railway Company (JR Central)
  - Kansai Main Line

== Layout ==
Haruta Station has a two elevated opposed side platforms.

=== Platforms ===
1	■ JR Central Kansai Line	for Kuwana, Yokkaichi, Kameyama
2	■ JR Central Kansai Line	for Nagoya

== Adjacent stations ==
«	Service	»
Central Japan Railway Company (JR Central)
Kansai Main Line
Hatta	Local	Kanie
Semi Rapid: Does not stop at this station
Rapid: Does not stop at this station
Rapid "Mie": Does not stop at this station
Limited Express "Nanki": Does not stop at this station

== History ==
Haruta Station was established Haruta Signal Stop on August 1, 1993. It was elevated in status to a full station on March 3, 2001.

Station numbering was introduced to the section of the Kansai Main Line operated JR Central in March 2018; Haruta Station was assigned station number CI02.
