= List of elevator test towers =

This is a list of all known elevator test towers in the world.

== List ==
Current as of February, 2024
Rank	Name	Company	Location	Height	Year completed	Remarks
1	H1 Tower	Hitachi	Guangzhou, China	897 ft (273 m)	2020	Became the tallest elevator test tower when completed in January 2020
2	Jauhar Test Tower	Otis	Shanghai, China	886 ft (270 m)	2018	In Shanghai, the world’s oldest elevator manufacturer is set to make the biggest research and development center for really tall elevators — a really tall test tower.
3	Canny Test Tower	Canny Elevator	Jiangsu, China	879 ft (268 m)	2018	Often referenced as being 288 m, this includes a 20 m underground section. This gives the structure a total testing height of 944 ft (288 m), height above ground is 879 ft (268 m)
4	Zhongshan TK Elevator Laboratory Tower	TK Elevator	Zhongshan, China	813 ft (248 m)	2018	
5	TK Elevator Test Tower Rottweil	TK Elevator	Rottweil, Germany	807 ft (246 m)	2017	Became the tallest elevator test tower upon completion in 2017; tallest elevator test tower in Europe
6	Kone Test Tower	Kone	Kunshan, Jiangsu, China	774 ft (236 m)	2015	Became the tallest elevator test tower upon completion in 2015
7	G1 Tower	Hitachi	Hitachinaka, Ibaraki, Japan	699 ft (213 m)	2010	Became the tallest elevator test tower upon completion in 2010
8	Asan Tower	Hyundai Elevator	Icheon, South Korea	673 ft (205 m)	2009	Became the tallest elevator test tower upon completion in 2009
9	Schindler Test Tower	Schindler Group	Shanghai, China	656 ft (200 m)	2017	
10	Solae Tower	Mitsubishi Electric	Inazawa, Japan	568 ft (173 m)	2007	Became the tallest elevator test tower upon completion in 2007
11	Fujitec Test Tower	Fujitec	Hikone, Japan	560 ft (170 m)		
12	Otis Test Tower	Otis	Shibayama, Japan	518 ft (158 m)	1998	Became the tallest elevator test tower upon completion in 1998
13	TK Test Tower	TKE orig; Dong Yang Group	Cheonan, South Korea	482 ft (147 m)	<2003	
14	TK Innovation Complex	TK Elevator	Atlanta, United States	420 ft (130 m)	2020	Under construction as of February 2020, scheduled for completion in 2020
15	National Lift Tower	Express Lift Company	Northampton, England	418 ft (127 m)	1982	Became the tallest elevator test tower upon completion in 1982
16	Canny Test Tower	Canny Elevator	Chengdu, China	394 ft (120 m)	2015	
17	Research Centre Test Tower	Otis	Bristol, Connecticut, United States	384 ft (117 m)	1987	
	Basarab Tower (former)		Bucharest, Romania	374 ft (114 m)	1988	demolished in 2020
18	Otis Test Tower	Otis orig built by GoldStar	Changwon, South Korea	374 ft (114 m)	1989	
19	Yukselis Elevator Test Tower	Yukselis Elevator	Ankara, Turkey	360 ft (110 m)	2020	The test tower, whose installation was completed by Yukselis Elevator, has been Turkey's highest test tower since 2020
20 tie	Canny Test Tower	Canny Elevator	Zhongshan, China	328 ft (100 m)	2015	
20 tie	Kleemann Test Tower	Kleemann Lifts	Kunshan, China	328 ft (100 m)	2018	
20 tie	XII Test Tower	VGSI Elevator	Dong Nai, Vietnam	328 ft (100m)	2019	
21	Canny Test Tower	Canny Elevator	Wujiang, China	312 ft (95 m)	2003/2009	
22	Hitachi Test Tower	Hitachi	Hitachinaka, Japan	295 ft (90 m)	1967	Became the tallest elevator test tower upon completion in 1967
23	Serpukhov Test Tower	Serpukov Elevator Plant	Serpukhov, Russia	293.47 ft (89.45 m)	2013	
24	Kiang Fah Test Tower	Mitsubishi Electric	Chonburi, Thailand	224 ft (68 m)	2017	
25	Schindler Test Tower	Schindler Group	Seville, Spain	213 ft (65 m)	1992	
26	Schindler Test Tower	Schindler Group	Randolph, New Jersey, United States	210 ft (64 m)		
27	Kleemann Test Tower	Kleemann	Kilkis, Greece	200 ft (61 m)	2010	
28	Kone (Montgomery) Test Tower (former)	Kone, Montgomery Elevator	Moline, Illinois, United States	180 ft (55 m)	1966	It is considered a city landmark by residents and former Montgomery employees.
29	Otis Test Tower	Otis	Florence, South Carolina, United States	152 ft (46 m)	2013	
30	Emlak Konut Elevator (EKA) Test Tower	Emlak Konut Elevator	Konya, Turkey	141 ft (43 m)	2022	The tower has 4 elevator shafts that tests different elevator applications.
31	ThyssenKrupp Elevator (Dover) Test Tower (former)	TK Elevator, Dover Corporation	Horn Lake, Mississippi, United States	138 ft (42 m)	1964	The tower has 14 elevator shafts that tests different elevator applications.
32	Haysite Reinforced Plastics Tower	Turnbull Elevator Inc.	Millcreek Township,Pennsylvania, United States	150 ft (45 m)	1966/67	Demolished on October 22, 2022.
Etc	KONE High-Rise Test Tower (Underground)	Kone	Tytyri, Finland	1,148 ft (350 m)	1997	One of Kone's major achievements in elevator technology was tested at this facility.

Elevator test towers of unknown height

Current as of August, 2020
Rank	Name	Company	Location	Height	Year completed	Image
	Aya Tower(former)	Dover Corporation	Mississauga, Ontario, Canada		1968	
	Maspero Elevatori Test Tower		Appiano Gentile, Como, Italy		1993	
	United States Elevator Corporation Test Tower	U.S. Elevator Corp.	Spring Valley, California, United States			
