= Seiko Niizuma =

Japanese actress and singer (born 1980)

- 新妻 聖子
- Born: October 8, 1980 (age 45); Inazawa, Aichi, Japan
- Education: Sophia University Faculty of Law International Relations Law Department
- Occupations: Actress, singer
- Years active: 2002-present
- Agent: Production Ogi
- Spouse: Unknown (m. 2017)
- Children: 2
- Relatives: Yukako Niizuma (sister)
- Awards: Kazuo Kikuta Theatre Award; National Arts Festival Theatre Department Newcomer Award
- Website: Official website

Seiko Niizuma (新妻 聖子, Niizuma Seiko; born 8 October 1980, in Sobue (now Inazawa), Nakashima District, Aichi Prefecture, Japan) is a Japanese actress and singer. She is represented with Production Ogi. Seiko is best known for her Musical theatre lead roles in Japan in Les Misérables, Miss Saigon, and Marie Antoinette.

On Television Seiko is well known for being the 5 time consecutive champion in the reality TV karaoke competition "Kanjani∞ no The Mozart Ongakuou No.1 Ketteisen"

Seiko has won numerous awards, such as the Kazuo Kikuta Theatre Award in 2005, the National Arts Festival Theatre Department Newcomer Award in 2006, and in 2016, the Tokiko Iwatani Award. Seiko has also performed with West end and Broadway superstars, Norm Lewis, Peter Jöback, Ramin Karimloo, and Sierra Boggess in I Love Musicals. (2016) Additionally, along with numerous roles on the stage and performances, Seiko had many roles in major television series and dramas as well as roles in films and even Anime. Seiko has released five albums, most recently Colors of Life in 2019. She was also ranked as the #5 top vocalists in Japan, by a panel of 190 music industry professionals. 2021, April 4 TBS TV program "Hontonotoko Oshiete Ranking".

== Personal life ==
On June 15, 2017, Seiko announced her marriage to a general man. She announced her pregnancy on February 11, 2018, and gave birth to her first child, a baby boy on July 20. On January 6, 2025, she gave birth to her second child, a baby boy.

== Awards ==
- 2005: 31st Kazuo Kikuta Theatre Award (21C: Mademoiselle Mozart as Mozart/Madame de Sade as Rene)
- 2006: 61st National Arts Festival Theatre Department Newcomer Award (Marie Antoinette as Marguerite Arnaud)
- 2016: 7th Tokiko Iwatani Award

== Filmography ==
=== TV series ===
Year	Title	Network	Notes
2002	King's Brunch	TBS	
2002	King's Oyashaku	TBS	
2003	Sekai Ururun Taizai-ki	MBS	
2007	Shumi Yūyū	NHK General TV	
2009	Asada! Namadesu Tabi Salad	ABC	"Kaigai Monthly" Guest
2010	NHK Kayō Concert	NHK General TV	
2010	Kin'yō Variety	NHK General TV	
2010	Kayō Charity Concert	NHK General TV	
2014	Comte no Gekijō: The Actors' Comedy	NHK BS-Premium	
2014	Music Fair	Fuji TV	
2015	FNS Summer Music Festival	Fuji TV	
2016	Gyōretsu no Dekiru Horitsu Sōdansho	NTV	
2016	Tokudane!	Fuji TV	Commentator
2016	Sashihara Kaiwaizu	Fuji TV	

=== TV drama ===
Year	Title	Role	Network	Notes	Ref.
2005	Hachirō: Haha no Uta, Chichi no Uta		NHK General TV		
2007	Horibe Yasubee	Isako	NHK General TV		
2014	Tokumei Tantei		TV Asahi		
2015	Kōun-chō Kōhī-ya Koyomi	Saeko Hirose	NHK		
2015	Shi no Zōki	Ryoko Namikawa	WOWOW		
2015	Aibō Season 14	Shiro Kanda	TV Asahi	Episode 9	
2016	Higanbana: Keishichō Sōsa Nana-ka	Yuka Karashima	NTV	Episode 9 and Final Episode	
2016	Sanada Maru	Oeyo	NHK	Taiga drama	

=== Radio ===
Title	Network
Will for Tomorrow	J-Wave

=== Stage ===
Year	Title	Role	Notes	Ref.
2003-2009	Les Misérables	Éponine		
2004-2013	Miss Saigon	Kim		
2005	21C: Mademoiselle Mozart	Mozart	Lead role	
2005	Madame de Sade	Rene		
2005	Love Letters	Melissa		
2006	Ninja Illusion: Naruto	Diva Waka		
2006	Marie Antoinette	Marguerite Arnaud		
2007	The Light in the Piazza	Clara Johnson		
2008	Midsummer Carol: Gama Ōji vs. Zarigani Majin	Mitsuoka		
2009	Spelling Bee	Olive Ostrovsky		
2009-2010	Nine	Louisa Contini		
2010	Candide	Cunégonde		
2010	Iliad	Kassandra		
2010	Pride	Moe Midorikawa		
2011	Les Misérables	Fantine		
2013	Tomorrow Morning	Kat		
2014	Catch Me If You Can	Brenda Strong		
2015	First Date	Casey		
2016	Crest of the Royal Family	Carol Reed		
2016	I Love Musicals	Herself		
2021	Spamalot	Lady of The Lake		
2021	Crest of the Royal Family	Isis		
2022-2024	The Bodyguard	Rachel Marron		
2023	John & Jen	Jen Tracy		
2026	101 Dalmatians	Cruella de Vil		

=== Films ===
Year	Title	Role	Notes
2010	Andante: Ine no Senritsu		
2018	Itosato	Otowa-dayou	

=== Japanese dub ===
Year	Title	Role	Voice dub for	Notes
2011	The Sound of Music	Maria	Julie Andrews	2011 TV Tokyo edition

=== Anime ===
Year	Title	Role	Ref.
2011	The Princess and the Pilot	Chise Karino	
2016	Pretty Cure All Stars: Singing with Everyone Miraculous Magic!	Solshiel	
2017	The Night Is Short, Walk on Girl	Kiko-san	

=== Advertisements ===
Year	Title
	Bourbon "Keep Cool Campaign" "France Butter no Cookie"
2016	Japan Digital Laboratory "Utahime Seiko Niizuma"
2018	Earth Corporation "Osudake No Mat Spray Type"
2019	Tama Home
2021	Tama Home

== Discography ==
=== Singles ===
Year	Title
2006	"Yume no Tsubasa"
2007	"Ai o Tomenaide: Always Loving You"
2008	"Virgin Road"
2011	"Toki no Tsubasa"
2012	"Arigatō"
2016	"Kono Inori: The Prayer"
2017	"Alive"/"Ametuchi no Koe"

=== Albums ===
Year	Title
2008	Musical Moments
2010	Andante
2013	Live Moments
2015	Seiko
2019	Colors of Life

=== Participation ===
Year	Title	Notes
2014	On the Stage	Co-star with Tetsuya Bessho
	"Kirameki no Mirai e"	400th anniversary commemorative of Nagoya
2016	Eiga Pretty Cure All Stars: Minna de Utau Kiseki no Mahō Musical Songs	"Hiyaku no Recipe", "Kangaete Mite", "Majo no Komori-uta (Acapella ver.)", "Majo no Komori-uta: Uta wa Mahō"

=== Tie-ups ===
Title	Tie-up
"Ai o Tomenaide: Always Loving You"	Theme song for Kagerō no Tsuji Inemuri Iwane Edo Zōshi
"Virgin Road"	Theme song for Ataka Ke no Hitobito
"Toki no Tsubasa"	Theme song for The Princess and the Pilot
"Jiyū no Tori ni Nare-fū ni Nare"	JDL (Japan Digital Laboratary) advertisement song
