= IFMA =

IFMA may refer to:

- Institut Français de Mécanique Avancée
- International Facility Management Association
- International Federation of Muaythai Associations
- International Foodservice Manufacturers Association
- Intreprinderea de Fabricat şi Montaj Ascensoare (Romania)
