= Solae =

Solae may refer to:

- Solae (company), an international soy ingredients supplier based in St. Louis, Missouri
- Solae (tower), an elevator testing tower in Inazawa, Japan
- The five solae, a foundational set of Christian theological principles of the Protestant Reformation
