= Urasa =

Urasa may refer to several places:

- Pakhli, an historic region once part of the Mughal province of Punjab once known as Urasa
- Urasa, Niigata, subdivision of Minamiuonuma, Japan
- Urăsa River
- Urasa Station, a railway station located in Minamiuonuma, Niigata, Japan
