= Nagoya Bunri University =

- 名古屋文理大学
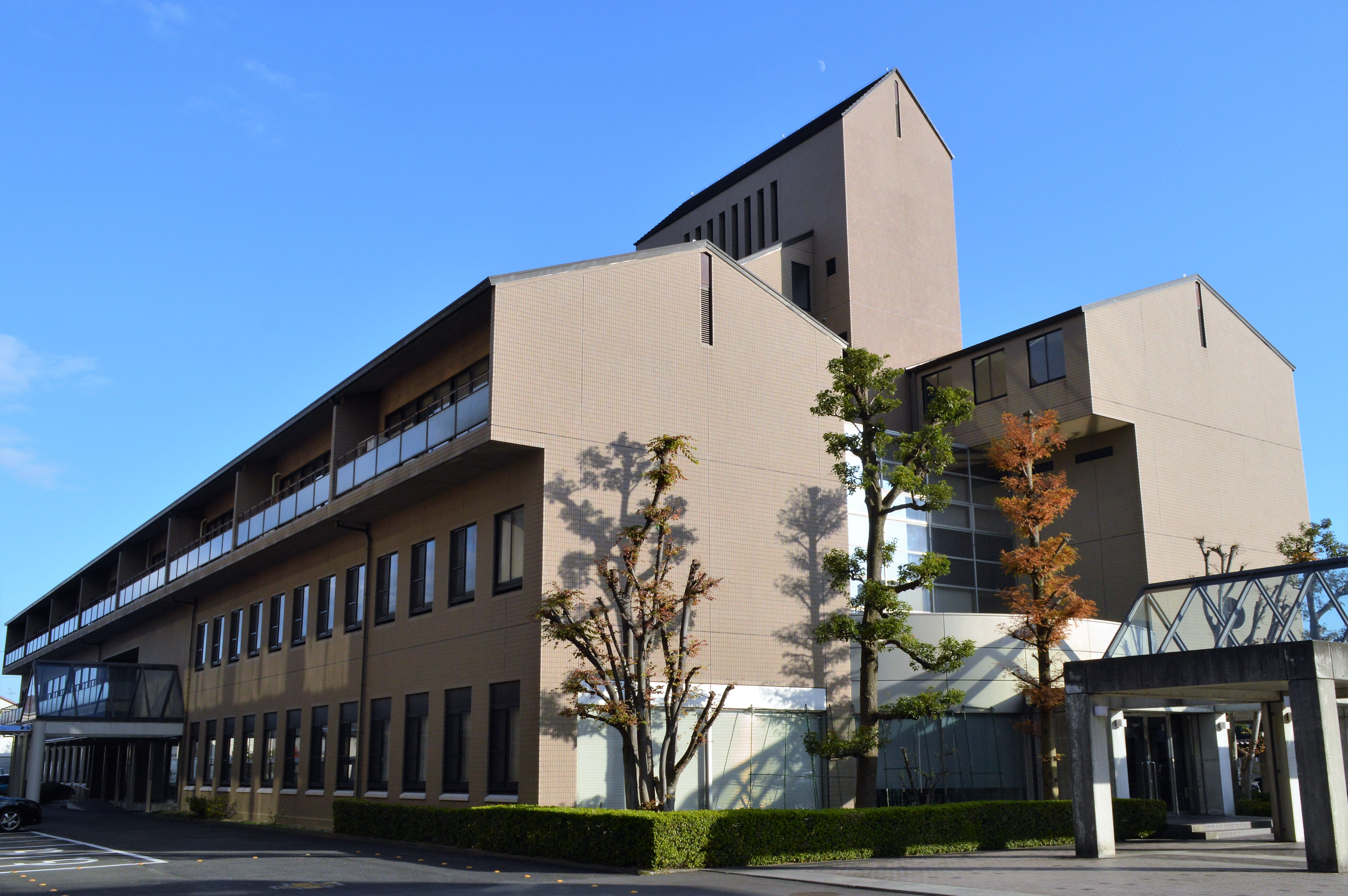
- Type: Private
- Established: 1941
- Location: Inazawa, Aichi, Japan; 35.248°N 136.791°E
- Website: www.nagoya-bunri.ac.jp/english/index.html

Nagoya Bunri University (名古屋文理大学, Nagoya bunri daigaku) is a private university in Inazawa, Aichi, Japan. The predecessor of the school was founded in 1941.

== Associated institutions ==
College of Nagoya Bunri University (名古屋文理大学短期大学部, Nagoya Bunri Daigaku Tanki Daigakubu) is a junior college in Nishi-ku, Nagoya, Japan. The junior college opened in April 1966, but the school was founded in 1941 as Shokuryō Kagaku Kenkyūjo (食糧科学研究所). It has been affiliated with Nagoya Bunri University since 1999, and offers courses in nutrition.

Nagoya Bunri Nutrition College (名古屋文理栄養士専門学校, Nagoya Bunri eiyoushi senmon gakkou), a vocational school in Nishi-ku, Nagoya, is also affiliated with Nagoya Bunri University.
