= Elevator test tower =

Type of structure

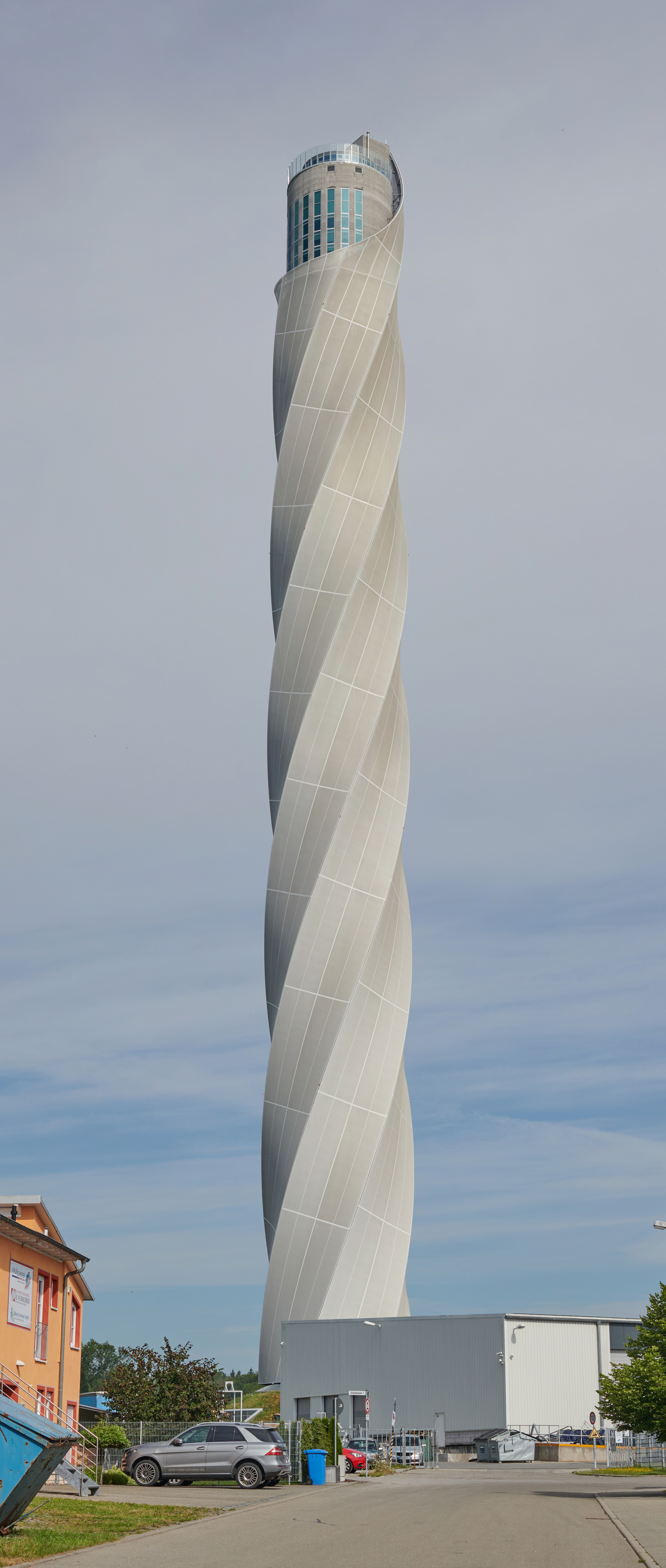
The TK Elevator Test Tower, an elevator test tower in Rottweil, Baden-Württemberg, Germany

An elevator test tower is a structure usually 100 to over 200 metres (300 feet to over 600 feet) tall that is designed to evaluate the stress and fatigue limits of specific elevator cars in a controlled environment. Tests are also carried out in the test tower to ensure reliability and safety in current elevator designs and address any failures that may arise.

Examples of an elevator test tower are the National Lift Tower in Northampton, England; the Solae Tower in Inazawa, Japan; and the TK Elevator Test Tower in Rottweil, Germany (owned by ThyssenKrupp).

== History ==
In 1888, Otis completed an elevator test tower at their factory in Yonkers, New York; this was possibly the first elevator test tower in the United States.

== See also ==
- List of elevator test towers
