= Urasa, Niigata =

Subdivision of Minamiuonuma, Japan

Urasa (浦佐) is a subdivision of the city of Minamiuonuma, Niigata, Japan. It was formerly a village. Urasa Station plays a major role in transportation for the local people in modern times.

Urasa is a home for enthusiasts of the local naked festival.
