= Owari Ōkunitama Shrine =

Shinto shrine in Inazawa, Aichi

Owari Ōkunitama Shrine 尾張大国霊神社
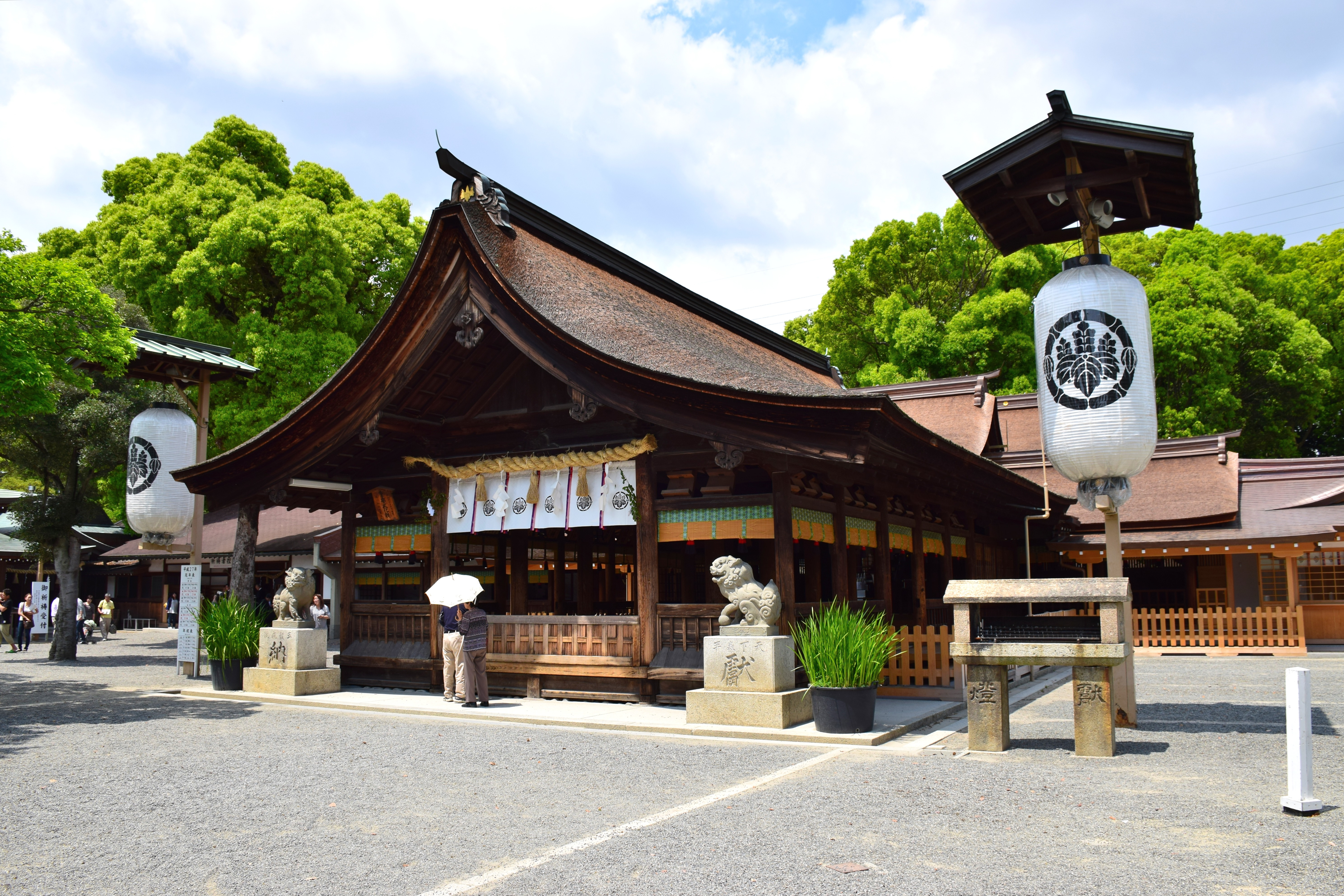
- Heiden of Owari Ōkunitama Shrine

- Location within Aichi Prefecture Location within Japan

Religion
- Affiliation: Shinto
- Deity: Ōkuninushi; Okunitama

Location
- Location: Inazawa-shi, Aichi-ken
- Coordinates: 35°15′22″N 136°48′18.5″E

Architecture
- Established: pre-Nara period

Website
- Official website

Owari Ōkunitama Shrine (尾張大国霊神社, Owari Ōkunitama Jinja) is a Shinto shrine located in the city of Inazawa, Aichi Prefecture, Japan. It was the sōja of Owari Province. The main kami enshrined is Ōkuninushi. The shrine's main festival is held annually on May 6. Due to its location near the site of the Nara period provincial capital of Owari Province, it is also called the Kōnomiya Shrine (国府宮神社) or Kōnomiya (国府宮)

== History ==
The original construction of this shrine is unknown. Although nominally dedicated to Ōkuninushi, this affiliation is uncertain, and the shrine asserts that it is dedicated to the tutelary spirits of the ancestors of the people of Owari. It became the sōja of Owari during the Nara period, and is mentioned in the Heian period Engishiki records. During the pre-World War II Modern system of ranked Shinto shrines, the shrine was ranked as a National Shrine, 3rd rank kokuhei-shōsha (国幣小社).

Two of the shrine's structures have been designated national Important Cultural Properties:

- Rōmon, built in early Muromachi period
- Heiden, built in the early Edo period

One of the biggest and oldest Hadaka Matsuris is the shrine's Hadaka Matsuri, which originated over 1300 years ago. Every year, people participate in this festival in hopes of gaining luck for the entire year. The most famous part of the festival is when the shin-otoko (神男) enters the stage and has to find a way back to the shrine, called naoiden. The participatants must try and touch the shin-otoko to transfer their bad luck. During the nighttime ceremony, all the bad luck is transferred in a charcoal colored giant mochi. The black mochi is made with rice mixed with the ashes of the burned omamori from last year. The mochi is then buried in a secret location in the nearby forest.

Women took part in the festival for the first time on 22 February 2024, with a group of 41 women having a minor role.

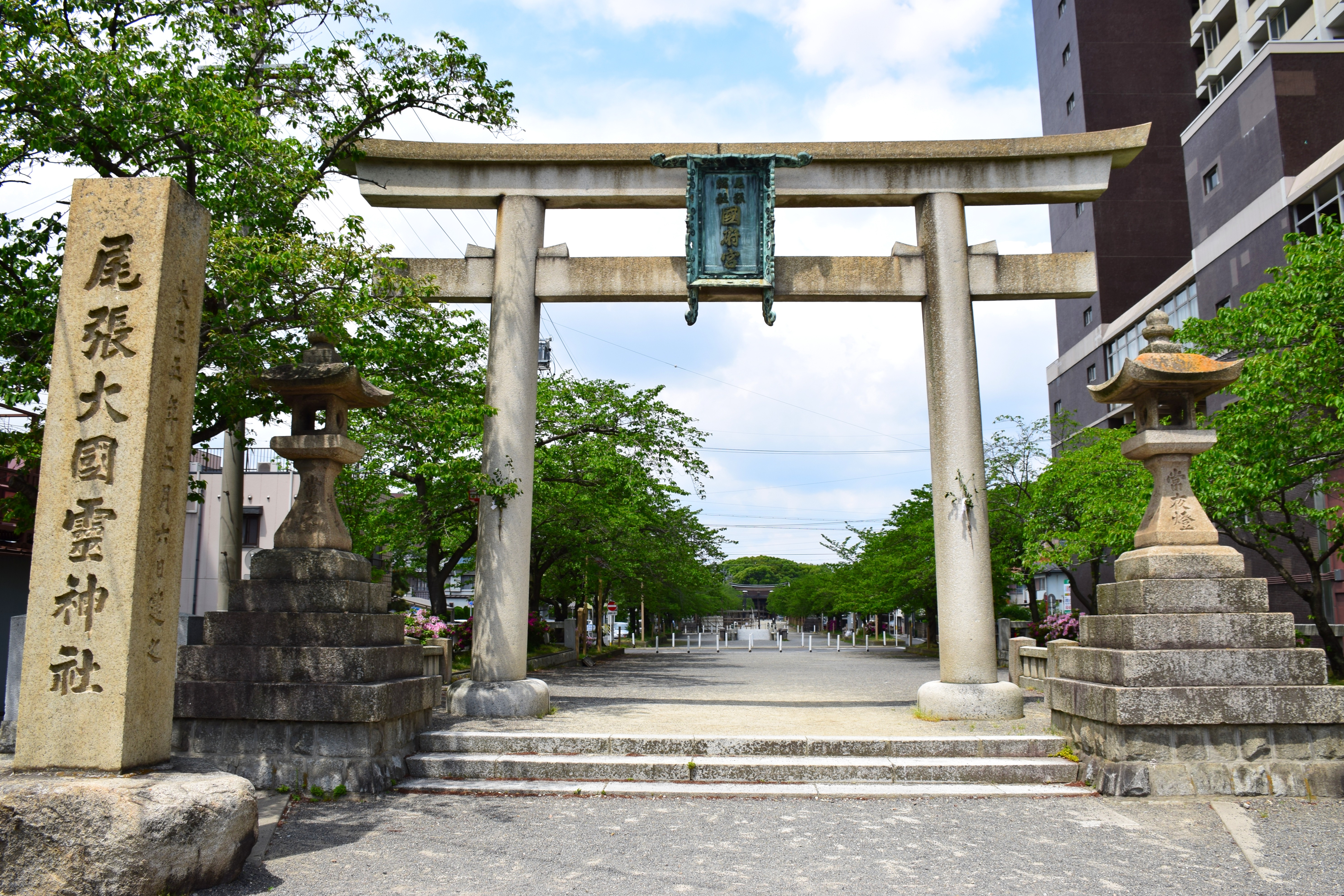
Torii and entry

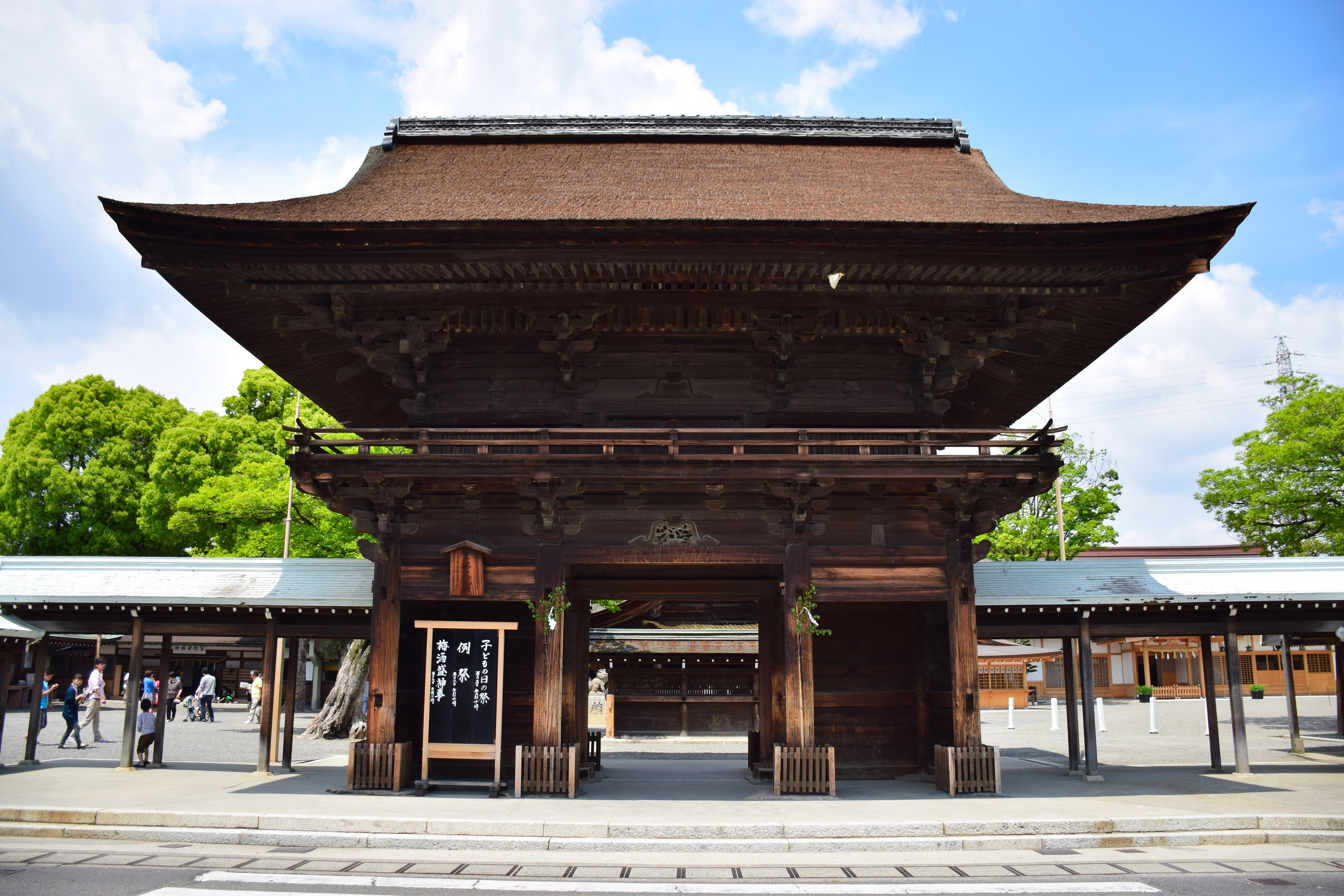
Gate (ICP)

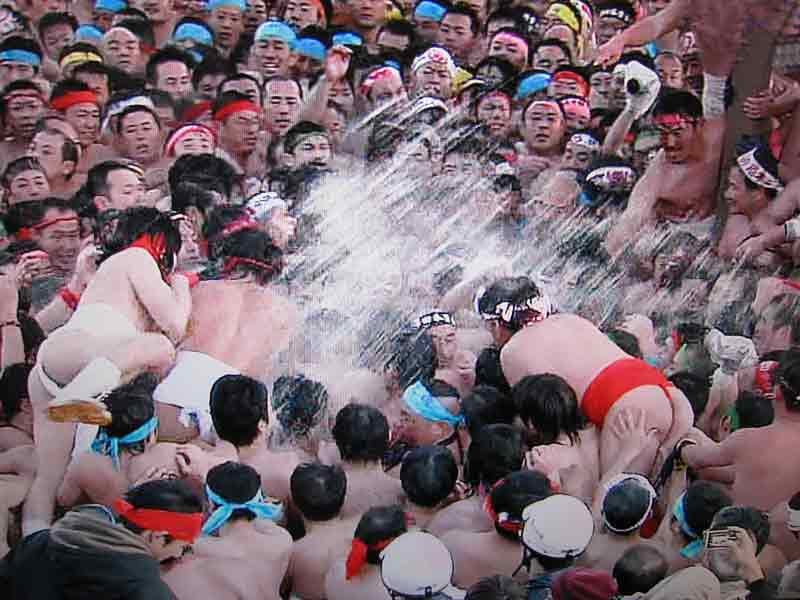
Hadaka Matsuri

== See also ==
- List of Shinto shrines
- Kunitama
