= Aichi Bunkyo Women's College =

Coordinates: 35°15′19.1″N 136°47′18.9″E

- 愛知文教女子短期大学
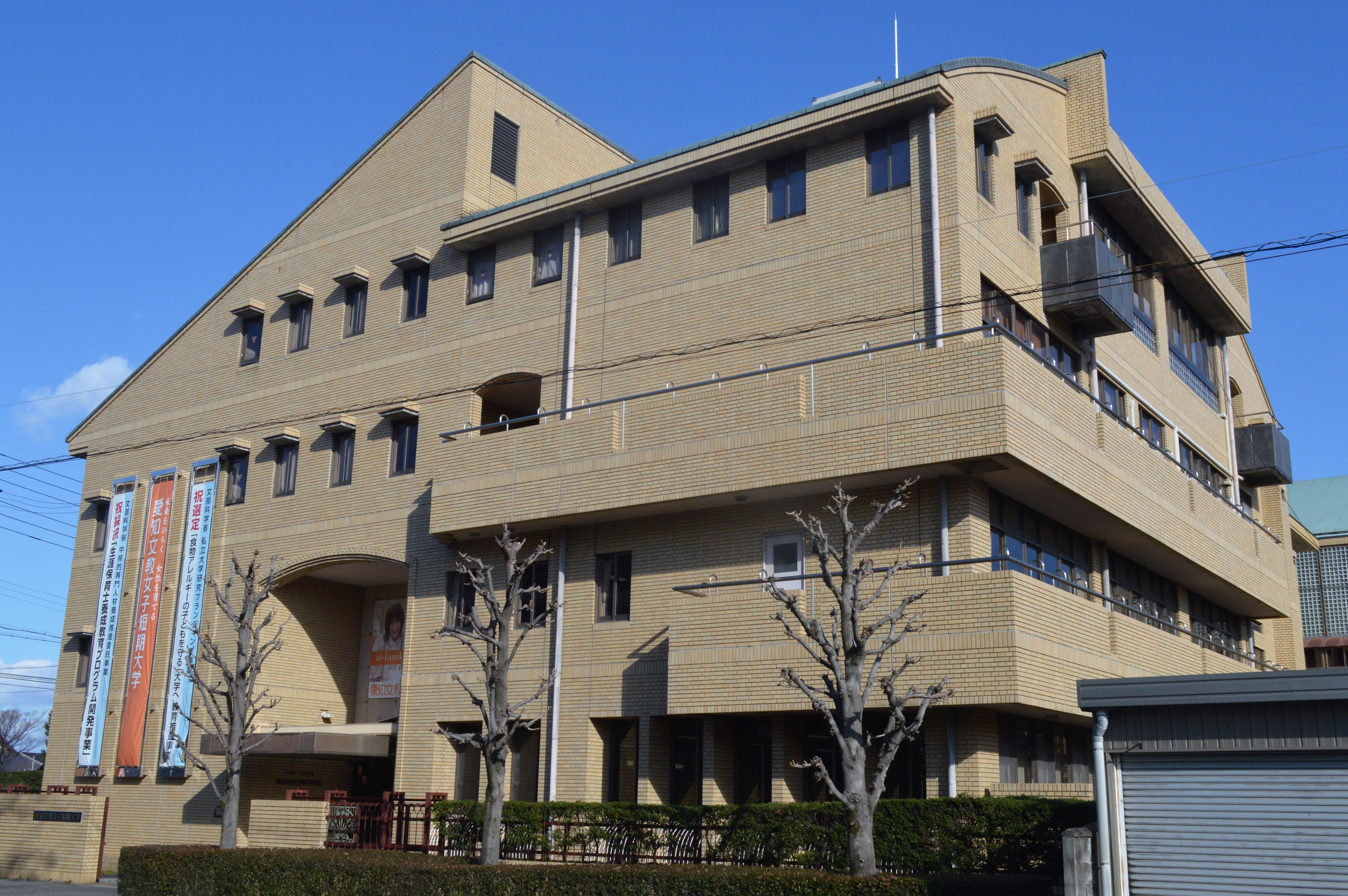
- Type: Private
- Established: 1951
- Location: Inazawa, Aichi, Japan
- Website: https://www.ai-bunkyo.ac.jp/

Aichi Bunkyo Women's College (愛知文教女子短期大学, Aichi Bunkyo Joshi Tanki Daigaku) is a private junior college in Inazawa, Aichi, Japan. It consists of two departments.

== Department and graduate course ==
=== Departments ===
- Department of life sciences
- Department of early childhood education

=== Advanced course ===
- Department of caregiveing

=== Available certifications ===
- Students can acquire the qualification of child care person in the department of early childhood education. In addition, a second class license of kindergarten teacher can be acquired in this department. The qualification of caregiver can be acquired in the advanced course.
- Second class license of junior high school teacher (subject of home economics) is in the department of life sciences. At first, a second class license of high school teacher (home economics) was set up.

== See also ==
- List of junior colleges in Japan
- Aichi Bunkyo University
