= Pretty Cure All Stars: Singing with Everyone Miraculous Magic! =

2016 film by Yutaka Tsuchida

Pretty Cure All Stars: Singing with Everyone♪ Miraculous Magic!
- Japanese: 映画プリキュアオールスターズ みんなで歌う♪奇跡の魔法！
- Revised Hepburn: Eiga Purikuya Ōru Sutāzu: Minna de Utau♪Kiseki no Mahō!
- Directed by: Yutaka Tsuchida
- Screenplay by: Isao Murayama
- Based on: Pretty Cure by Izumi Todo
- Starring: Rie Takahashi; Yui Horie; Yū Shimamura; Masumi Asano; Hibiku Yamamura; Miyuki Sawashiro
- Cinematography: Kenji Takahashi
- Music by: Hiroshi Takaki
- Production company: Toei Animation
- Distributed by: Toei Company, Ltd.
- Release date: March 19, 2016
- Running time: 70 minutes
- Country: Japan
- Language: Japanese

Pretty Cure All Stars: Singing with Everyone♪ Miraculous Magic! (Japanese: 映画プリキュアオールスターズ みんなで歌う♪奇跡の魔法！, Hepburn: Eiga Purikuya Ōru Sutāzu: Minna de Utau♪Kiseki no Mahō!) is a 2016 Japanese animated action fantasy musical film based on the Pretty Cure franchise created by Izumi Todo. The film is directed by Yutaka Tsuchida, written by Isao Murayama, and produced by Toei Animation. The film was released in Japan on March 19, 2016.

Marking the eighth entry to the Pretty Cure All Stars crossover film series, the Witchy PreCure! team joins the previous Pretty Cure teams as they encounter a mysterious witch named Solcière and her partner Trauuma trying to acquire their tears.

The film also marks the first Pretty Cure film to be presented as a musical, while the last in the series to be titled All Stars prior to the release of Hug! Pretty Cure Futari wa Pretty Cure: All Stars Memories (2018) and Pretty Cure All Stars F (2023).

== Plot ==
The Witchy PreCure! team: Mirai and Riko come across Go! Princess PreCure team: Haruka, Minami, Kirara and Towa on their way to a flower viewing party. Just then, a sorceress named Solcière uses Haruka's memories to reawaken their enemy, Dyspear. As both Go! Princess and Witchy team transforms and join forces to fight against Dyspear, she is suddenly dispelled by a girl's singing. Solcière and her servant Trauuma, who plot to use Pretty Cure tears for a potion, then capture the Cures, taking them to another world.

Separated from each other, Cure Miracle comes across the HappinessCharge PreCure! team: Cures Lovely, Princess, Honey and Fortune, while Cure Magical encounters the DokiDoki! PreCure team: Cures Heart, Diamond, Rosetta, Sword and Ace, helping to protect them as they are targeted by Solcière's reincarnations of past foes, but end up getting captured alongside several other Cures. Later, Cure Miracle comes across Cures Peach, Blossom, Melody and Happy, with mascot Lulun, while Magical reunites with Go! Princess team, along with Cure Echo. Meanwhile, previous Pretty Cure teams, whom are currently captured in Solcière's lair, unsuccessfully makes their effort to escape, and Mofurun, Pafu, and Aroma come across the Miracle Lights that can be used to dispel evil. Struggling without their partners, Miracle and Magical come close to despairing but are encouraged by their fellow Cures to stand up and fight. Hearing the singing again, Miracle and Magical go off in search of its source, managing to reunite with each other and confront Solcière, who has captured all the other Cures. Overcoming Solcière's attacks, the girls learn that she was once a witch's apprentice who could never seem to get the admiration of her master before she died, seeking to use the Pretty Cure's tears to revive her and learn how to perform the ultimate spell.

Managing to obtain one of Miracle's tears, Trauuma reveals that his true plan was never to make a resurrection potion but instead to restore himself to his true form and spread darkness all over the world. Hearing the song of Miracle and Magical despite their injuries, Solcière sings the song taught to her by her master, which turns out to be the ultimate spell all along, healing everyone's injuries and giving power to the Cures. With the power of Solcière's song and the Miracle Lights, the 44 Pretty Cures combine forces and manage to defeat Trauuma. After the battle, Solcière decides to follow her master's footsteps and become a teacher. The Cures have their long-awaited flower viewing party, while being surprised that Mirai and Riko can use magic.

== Voice cast ==
Witchy PreCure! cast

- Rie Takahashi as Mirai Asahina/Cure Miracle
- Yui Horie as Riko Izayoi/Cure Magical
- Ayaka Saitō as Mofurun

Go! Princess PreCure cast

- Yū Shimamura as Haruka Haruno/Cure Flora
- Masumi Asano as Minami Kaido/Cure Mermaid
- Hibiku Yamamura as Kirara Amanogawa/Cure Twinkle
- Miyuki Sawashiro as Towa Akagi/Cure Scarlet
- Nao Tōyama as Pafu
- Shiho Kokido as Aroma

HappinessCharge PreCure! cast

- Megumi Nakajima as Megumi Aino/Cure Lovely
- Megumi Han as Hime Shirayuki/Cure Princess
- Rina Kitagawa as Yūko Omori/Cure Honey
- Haruka Tomatsu as Iona Hikawa/Cure Fortune

DokiDoki! PreCure cast

- Hitomi Nabatame as Mana Aida/Cure Heart
- Minako Kotobuki as Rikka Hishikawa/Cure Diamond
- Mai Fuchigami as Alice Yotsuba/Cure Rosetta
- Kanako Miyamoto as Makoto Kenzaki/Cure Sword
- Rie Kugimiya as Aguri Madoka/Cure Ace

Smile PreCure! cast

- Misato Fukuen as Miyuki Hoshizora/Cure Happy
- Asami Tano as Akane Hino/Cure Sunny

Suite PreCure cast

- Ami Koshimizu as Hibiki Hojo/Cure Melody

HeartCatch PreCure! cast

- Nana Mizuki as Tsubomi Hanasaki/Cure Blossom
- Fumie Mizusawa as Erika Kurumi/Cure Marine

Fresh Pretty Cure! cast

- Kanae Oki as Love Momozono/Cure Peach

Yes! PreCure 5 GoGo! cast

- Yūko Sanpei as Nozomi Yumehara/Cure Dream

Futari wa Pretty Cure Splash Star cast

- Orie Kimoto as Saki Hyuga/Cure Bloom/Cure Bright

Futari wa Pretty Cure Max Heart cast

- Yōko Honna as Nagisa Misumi/Cure Black
- Yukana as Honoka Yukishiro/Cure White
- Asuka Tanii as Lulun

Film characters

- Mamiko Noto as Ayumi Sakagami/Cure Echo
- Seiko Niizuma as Solcière
- Koji Yamamoto as Trauuma

== Production ==
In November 2015, it was announced that a new Pretty Cure All Stars film was in the works. The film will be directed by Yutaka Tsuchida, while Isao Murayama, who wrote the Pretty Cure All Stars DX trilogy and Witchy PreCure! series, provided the screenplay for the film, with All Stars character designer Mitsuru Aoyama returning to his position. In January 2016, Japanese musical actors Seiko Niizuma and Koji Yamamoto were cast as Solcière and Trauuma respectively.

== Music ==
The musical score for the film was composed by Hiroshi Takaki, whom composed DokiDoki! PreCure, HappinessCharge PreCure!, Go! Princess PreCure and Witchy PreCure! series, while the musical numbers were written and composed by Yukinori Mori.

=== Musical numbers ===
1. "Anata ga Iru Kara" (あなたがいるから; lit. "Because You Are Here") – Mirari, Riko, Haruka, Minami, Kirara, Towa and ensemble (performed by Rie Takahashi, Yui Horie, Yū Shimamura, Masumi Asano, Hibiku Yamamura, Miyuki Sawashiro, Nao Toyama, Shiho Kokido)
2. "Hiyaku no Reshipi" (秘薬のレシピ; lit. "Secret Medicine's Recipe") – Trauuma and Solcière (performed by Koji Yamamoto and Seiko Niizuma)
3. "Muryokuna Senshi" (無力な戦士; lit. "Exhausted Soldier") – Cure Miracle and Cure Magical (performed by Takahashi and Horie)
4. "Yatto Aeta ne!" (やっと会えたね！; lit. "We Finally Meet!") – Insert song (performed by Mayumi Gojo)
5. "Kangaete mite" (考えてみて; lit. "Let's Reconsider") – Cure Miracle, Cure Magical and Solcière (performed by Takahashi, Horie and Niizuma)
6. "Majō no Komoriuta (Akapera ver.)" (魔女の子守唄（アカペラ ver.）; lit. "The Witch's Lullaby (Acapella ver.)) – Solcière (performed by Niizuma)
7. "Majō no Komoriuta~Uta wa Mahō" (魔女の子守唄～歌は魔法; lit. "The Witch's Lullaby~The Song of Magic") – Solcière and Pretty Cure All Stars (performed by Niizuma and Pretty Cure All Stars)
8. "Anata ga Iru Kara☆Purikyua Ōru Sutāzu" (みんながいるから☆プリキュアオールスターズ; lit. "Because Everyone's Here☆Pretty Cure All Stars") – Pretty Cure All Stars (performed by Pretty Cure All Stars)

== Release ==
The film was released in theaters in Japan on March 19, 2016.

== Reception ==
=== Box office ===
The film dropped from 6th place to 8th place out of top 10 in the Japanese box office in its second week.
