= Heiwa, Aichi =

Dissolved municipality in Aichi prefecture, Japan

Heiwa (平和町, Heiwa-chō) was a town in Nakashima District, Aichi Prefecture, Japan. On April 1, 2005, Heiwa and the neighboring town of Sobue were merged into the expanded city of Inazawa. Before the merger, a prefectural overview of municipalities listed Heiwa's population as 13,238 and its area as 8.83 square kilometres.

== Geography ==
Heiwa was a riverine agricultural town. The former town area was surrounded by the Nikko, Miyake and Ryonai rivers, and local history published by Inazawa City describes the control and use of water as central to the area's agricultural development. Much of the former town lay in the zero-metre zone, so flood control remained a major local concern.

== History ==
Historical administrative data records an earlier village of Heiwa from 1906 to 1954; the town of Heiwa was established on April 1, 1954. Inazawa City's chronology of the former municipality notes that Heiwa received group evacuees from Yatomi after the Isewan Typhoon in 1959, built a new town office in 1977, opened a municipal library in 1986, and marked the 50th anniversary of town status in 2004. A closing ceremony was held in 2005 before the merger into Inazawa.

== Legacy ==
In modern Inazawa statistical tables, the former Heiwa town area still appears as one of the city's historical districts in some categories, including agriculture. Cherry-tree planting became one of Heiwa's best-known local traditions in the postwar period. Inazawa City states that residents planted cherry trees along the left bank of the Miyake River over a three-kilometre stretch in the early postwar decades and extended the planting to the Nikko River in 1967; the town's northern district was also known for growing cherry saplings from the Taishō era. The landscape was severely affected when Typhoon 19 struck in September 1976, flooding about 30 percent of the town and causing roughly 700 million yen in damage, including agricultural losses; many riverside cherry trees were then removed during flood-control works.

The cherry landscape was later rebuilt. The town chronology records the completion of the Nikko River sakura embankment in 1993 and the Sugatani River sakura embankment in 1997. Inazawa City states that the Nikko River embankment was developed as a Ministry of Construction "Sakura-zutsumi Model Project", while the Sugatani River embankment was laid out as a 1,500-metre greenway with cherry plantings on both banks. The former Heiwa town area is now the site of the "Heiwa Sakura Necklace", a connected cherry-blossom landscape of about 1,400 trees and roughly 60 varieties.
