= H1 Tower =

- Interactive map of the H1 Tower area

General information
- Status: Completed
- Type: Concrete tower
- Location: Guangzhou, China
- Coordinates: 23.02034°N 113.28635°E
- Completed: 2020
- Owner: Hitachi

Height
- Architectural: 273 m (896 ft)

The H1 Tower is an elevator testing tower in Guangzhou, China, owned by Hitachi. At 273.8 m (898 ft) it is the tallest elevator testing tower in the world. Including the 15 m (49 ft) deep basement, the overall height of the tower measures 288.8 m (948 ft).

The structure includes 15 elevator test shafts, totaling 2.2 km (1.4 mi) in length. The longest continuous shaft in the tower is over 250 m (820 ft) long.

H1 Tower supplements Hitachi's 213.5 m (700 ft) tall G1 Tower in Japan, which was completed in 2010.

== See also ==
- List of elevator test towers
