= Aichi Bunkyo University =

- 愛知文教大学
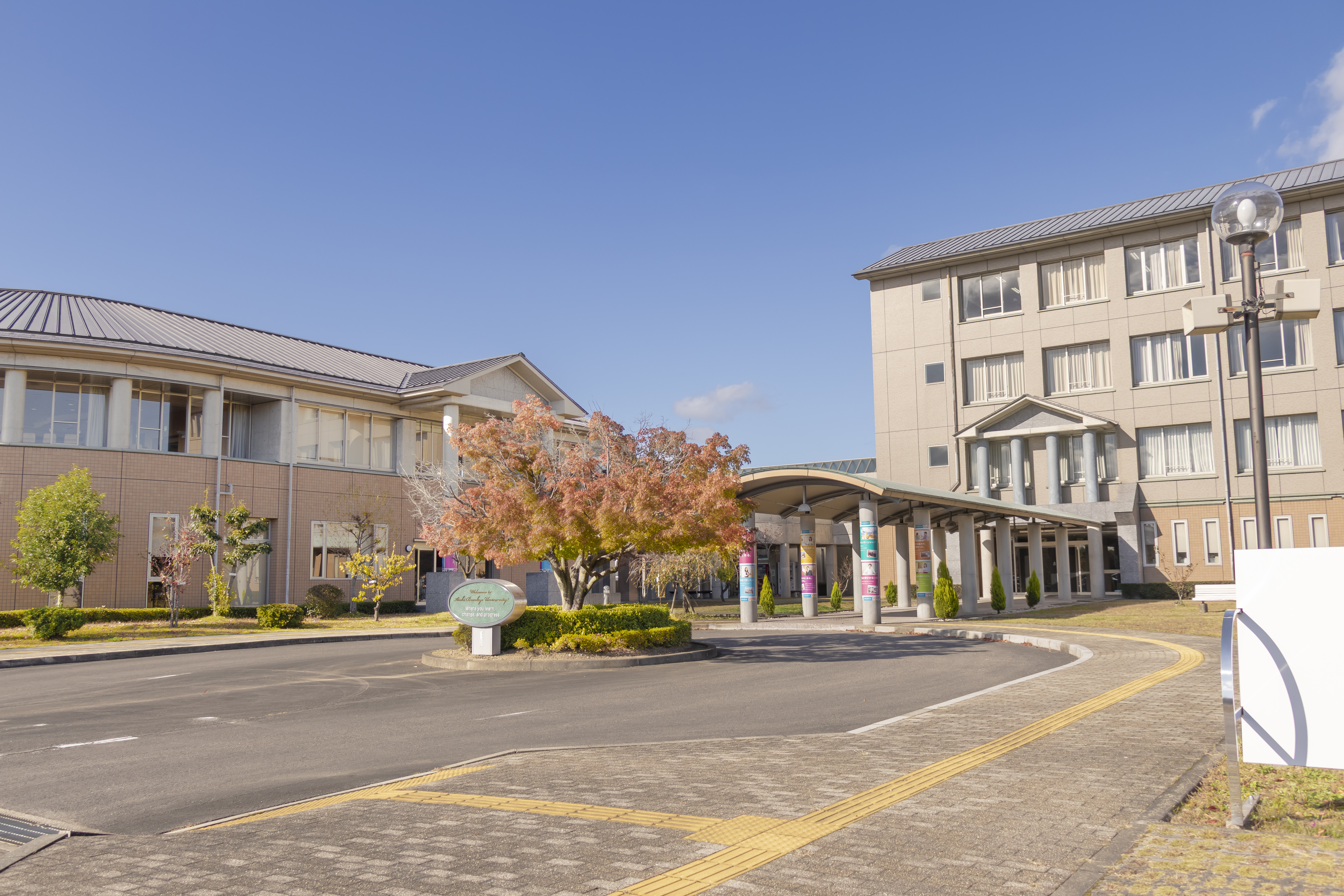
- Type: Private
- Established: 1998
- President: Mr. Takehiro Tomita
- Undergraduates: Department of Humanities, Global English Program, Chinese Language and Culture Program, Teacher-Education Program
- Location: Komaki, Aichi, Japan; 35.300°N 137.007°E
- Website: www.abu.ac.jp

Aichi Bunkyo University (愛知文教大学, Aichi bunkyō daigaku) is a private university in Komaki, Aichi, Japan, established in 1998 and specializing in the humanities. It is right next to Nagoya Zokei University and is associated with Aichi Bunkyo Women's College. The university will suspend admissions starting in the 2027 academic year due to low enrollment and is expected to close in March 2030.

== Notable alumni ==
Seira Ryū - voice actress
