= Sobue =

Dissolved municipality in Aichi prefecture, Japan

Sobue 祖父江町
- Former municipality
- Flag Emblem

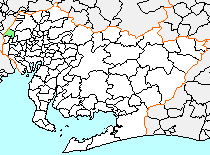
- Location of Sobue in Aichi Prefecture
- Country: Japan
- Region: Chūbu
- Prefecture: Aichi Prefectre
- Merged: April 1, 2005 (now part of Inazawa)

Area
  - Total: 22.12 km^{2} (8.54 sq mi)

Population (2005)
  - Total: 22,829
  - Density: 1,032.05/km^{2} (2,673.0/sq mi)

Sobue (祖父江町, Sobue-chō) was a town located in Nakashima District, Aichi Prefecture, Japan. As of 2005, the town had an estimated population of 22,829 and a population density of 1,032.05 persons per km^{2}. The total area was 22.12 km^{2}.

On April 1, 2005, Sobue, along with the town of Heiwa (also from Nakashima District), was merged into the expanded city of Inazawa.
