= Basarab Tower =

- Interactive map of the Basarab Tower area

General information
- Status: Demolished
- Location: Bucharest, Romania
- Coordinates: 44.45208°N 26.06036°E
- Construction started: 1986
- Completed: 1988
- Demolished: 2020

Height
- Roof: 104 m (341 ft)

Basarab Tower was an elevator testing building in Bucharest built between 1986 and 1988. It had 23 floors and measured 114 meters. The surface of a level was 400 square meters. The tower's components consisted of 8 wells and laboratories built for testing elevators. It was the tallest industrial building in Romania and the tallest elevator testing tower in Europe. The main purpose of the tower's existence was for testing the elevators which were scheduled to be added in the Palace of the Parliament of Romania.

Demolition of the tower, along with the rest of the IFMA factory, began in April 2020, in its place being built a residential complex.
