= Nakashima District =

Former district in Aichi prefecture, Japan

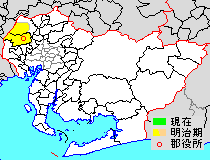
Location of former Nakashima-gun, Aichi Prefecture, highlighted in yellow.

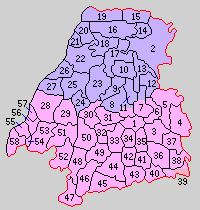
Colored areas are in this district.

Nakashima (中島郡, Nakashima-gun) was a district located in Aichi Prefecture, Japan, which existed until 2005.

As of 2003, the district had an estimated population of 36,239 with a density of 1,170.89 persons per km^{2}. The total area was 30.95 km^{2}.

== Municipalities ==
Prior to its dissolution, the district consisted of only towns:

- Heiwa (Note: Classified as a town.)
- Sobue

== History ==
=== Recent mergers ===
- On April 1, 2005 - The towns of Heiwa and Sobue were merged into the expanded city of Inazawa. Therefore, Nakashima District was dissolved as a result of this merger.

== See also ==
- List of dissolved districts of Japan
