= Hadaka Matsuri =

Annual Japanese festival

A Hadaka Matsuri (裸祭り, 'Naked Festival') is a type of Japanese festival, or matsuri, in which participants usually wear a minimum amount of clothing – usually just a fundoshi loincloth, sometimes with a short happi coat – and rarely are completely naked.

Naked festivals are held in dozens of places throughout Japan every year, usually in February or November.

== Hayama-gomori ==
Hayama-gomori at Kuronuma Shrine, district of Kanezawa, Fukushima, held for three days starting around 16 November but varying with the lunar calendar, is a secret ceremony that has taken place for over a thousand years, in which omens from the gods are bestowed on humans, that is considered off-limits to visitors, but there are no restrictions on viewing the ta-asobi portion.

For a three-day period, the men who enter the area first purify their bodies in a hall located near the shrine. At five in the morning each day, they strip naked at a sacred well and douse themselves with the freezing water as they offer prayers: their own, their friends’ and their family members'. During this period, their diet consists of locally harvested hakusai cabbage and daikon radish, along with white rice steamed in well water.

On the first night, the participants, in loincloths, perform a ritual ceremony evoking rice farming. Drums beat in a representing thunder and clouds and the participants move in procession in circles, praying for rain. Then they collide together in a mock cavalry battle while crying "Yoisa!" to represent plowing by farm horses. They then pick up and drop tatami mats evoking rice seedling planting, while singing planting songs. The ritual ceremony ends with prayers for a bountiful rice farming year.

On the second day, in the nude, they pound mochi rice into cakes to offer to the gods. In another room, elders turn vegetables into male and female forms to be offered to the gods.

On the third day, from three in the morning, yama-gake begins. Participants wear tenugui (hand towel) head coverings and a white costume looking like ritual dolls, then ascend the mountain. They then stand in front of a shrine and listen to a bell rung to purify their hearts. A noriwara (an hereditary oracle) is then possessed by the gods and foretells the weather and the coming harvest.

This ceremony is the origin of the hadaka-matsuri, in which participants purify their bodies in preparation for contact with the gods.

== Konomiya ==
Konomiya Hadaka Matsuri
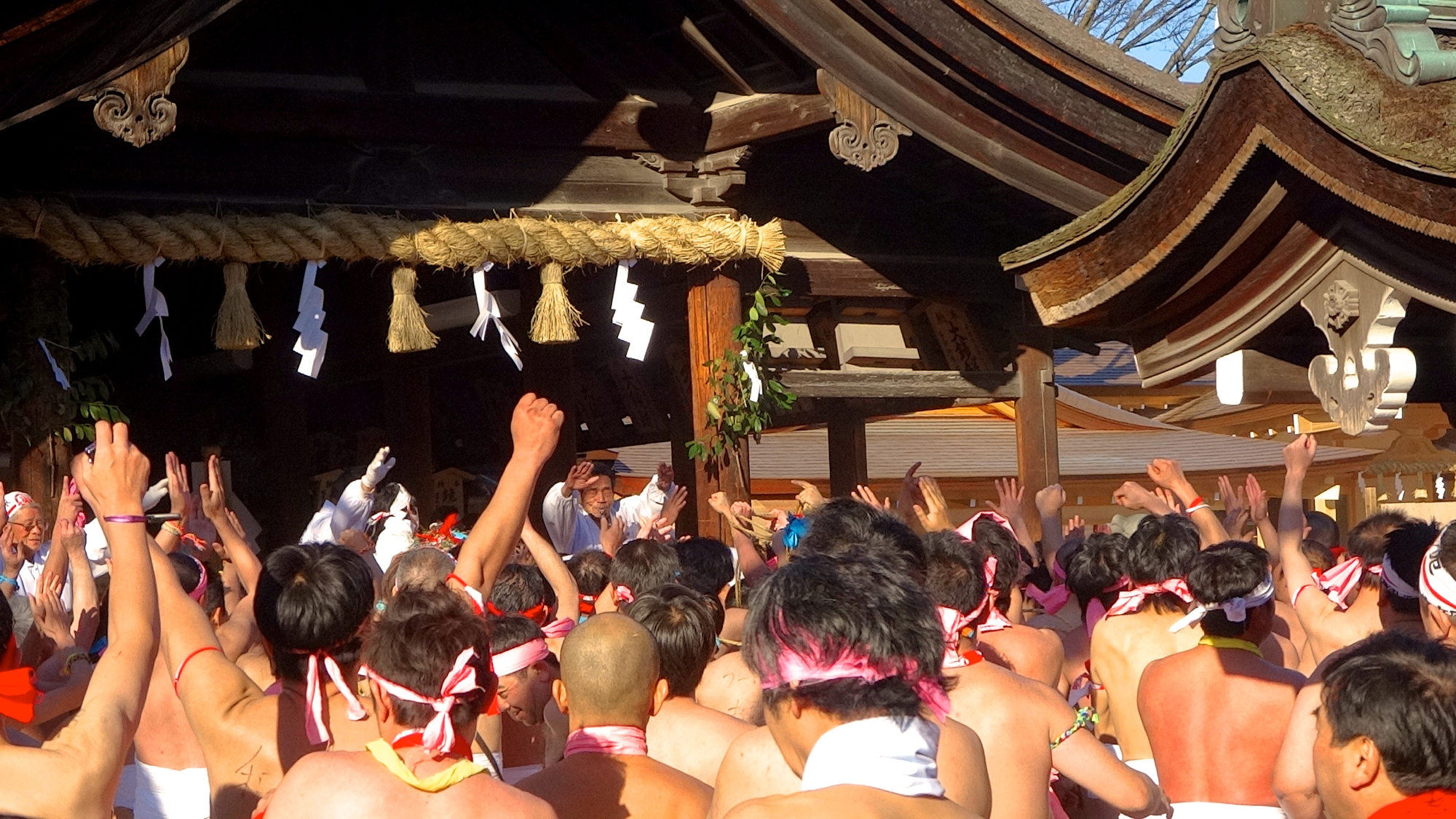
- Observed by: Japan
- Type: Religious
- Date: twelfth day of the first month of the Chinese calendar
- 2025 date: 10 February
- 2026 date: 1 March
- 2027 date: 18 February
- 2028 date: 7 February
- Frequency: annual

One of the biggest and oldest Hadaka Matsuris is the Owari Ōkunitama Shrine Hadaka Matsuri held in Inazawa, where the festival originated over 1300 years ago. Every year, people participate in this festival in hopes of gaining luck for the entire year. The most famous part of the festival is when the shin-otoko (神男) enters the stage and has to find a way back to the shrine, called naoiden. The participants must try and touch the shin-otoko to transfer their bad luck. During the nighttime ceremony, all the bad luck is transferred in a charcoal colored giant mochi. The black mochi is made with rice mixed with the ashes of the burned omamori from last year. The mochi is then buried in a secret location in the nearby forest.

Women took part in the festival for the first time on 22 February 2024, with a group of 41 clothed women having a minor role.

== Saidaiji ==
Saidaiji Hadaka Matsuri
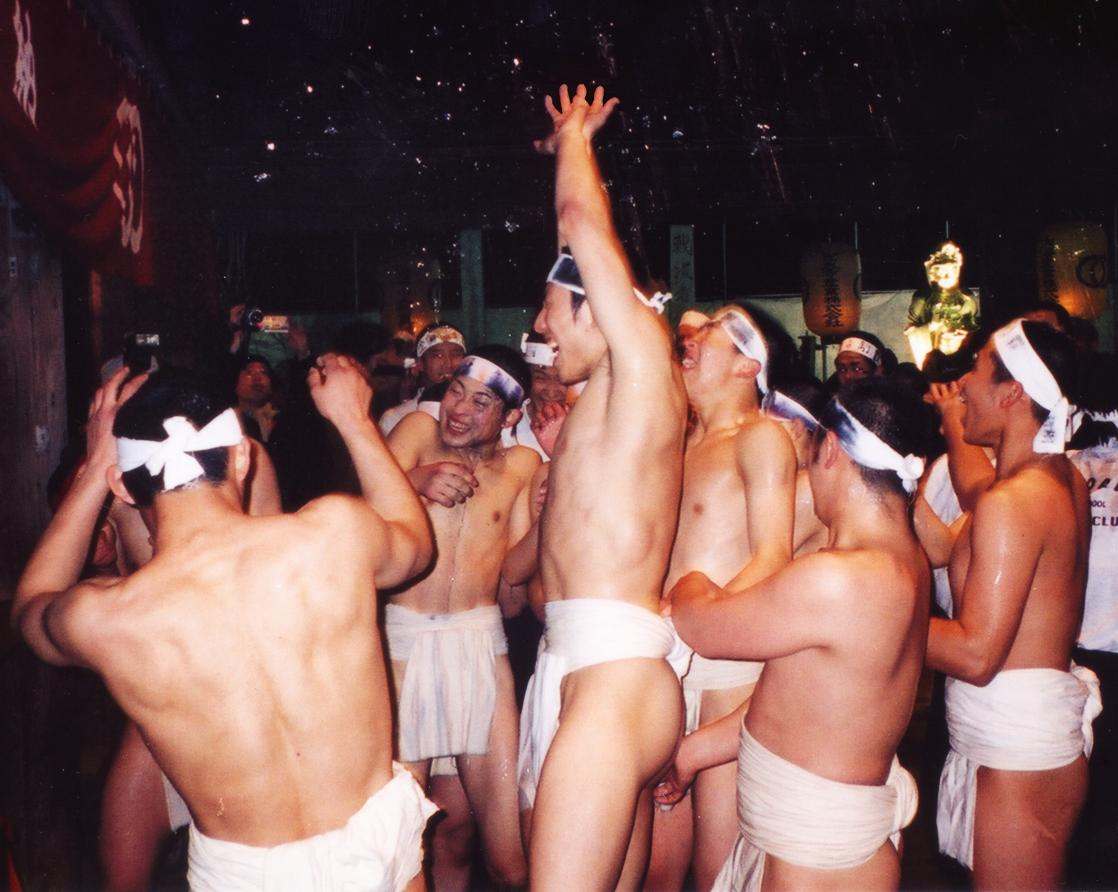
- Participants receiving purification by water at the naked festival at Saidaiji in Okayama.
- Observed by: Japan
- Type: Religious
- Significance: Celebrates the blessings of a bountiful harvest and all manner of prosperity and fertility
- Date: Third Saturday in February
- 2025 date: February 15
- 2026 date: February 21
- 2027 date: February 20
- 2028 date: February 19
- Frequency: annual

The most famous festival is the Saidai-ji Eyo Hadaka Matsuri held in Okayama, where the festival originated over 500 years ago. Every year, over 9,000 men participate in this festival in hopes of gaining luck for the entire year.

On the 3rd Saturday in February, for the past 500 years, the Saidaiji Temple near Okayama city has celebrated Hadaka Matsuri.

== Others ==
Shitennoji Temple at Tennoji, Osaka, Doya Doya Hadaka Matsuri (Naked) Festival is a ceremony in which two groups of young men compete for an amulet of the cow god Gyu-o-Hoin, attached to the central pillar, screaming "Doya! Doya!".

Every third weekend of September, for Ohara Hadaka Matsuri in Ohara, Chiba Prefecture, bearers of mikoshi, mostly dressed in a simple loincloth, and spectators pray for big harvests and good fishing.

The Somin Shōrai legend is the inspiration for the Somin Festival (蘇民祭 Somin-sai) held in various places within Iwate Prefecture, the most famous of which being the one held every February at Kokuseki-ji Temple in Ōshū City. In this festival, hundreds of half-naked men compete to grab the 'Somin bag' (蘇民袋 Somin-bukuro), which is said to bring good fortune.

== See also ==
- Tamotsu Yatō
- Hakata Gion Yamakasa
