= TK Elevator Test Tower =

Elevator test tower in Rottweil, Germany

- TK Elevator Testturm

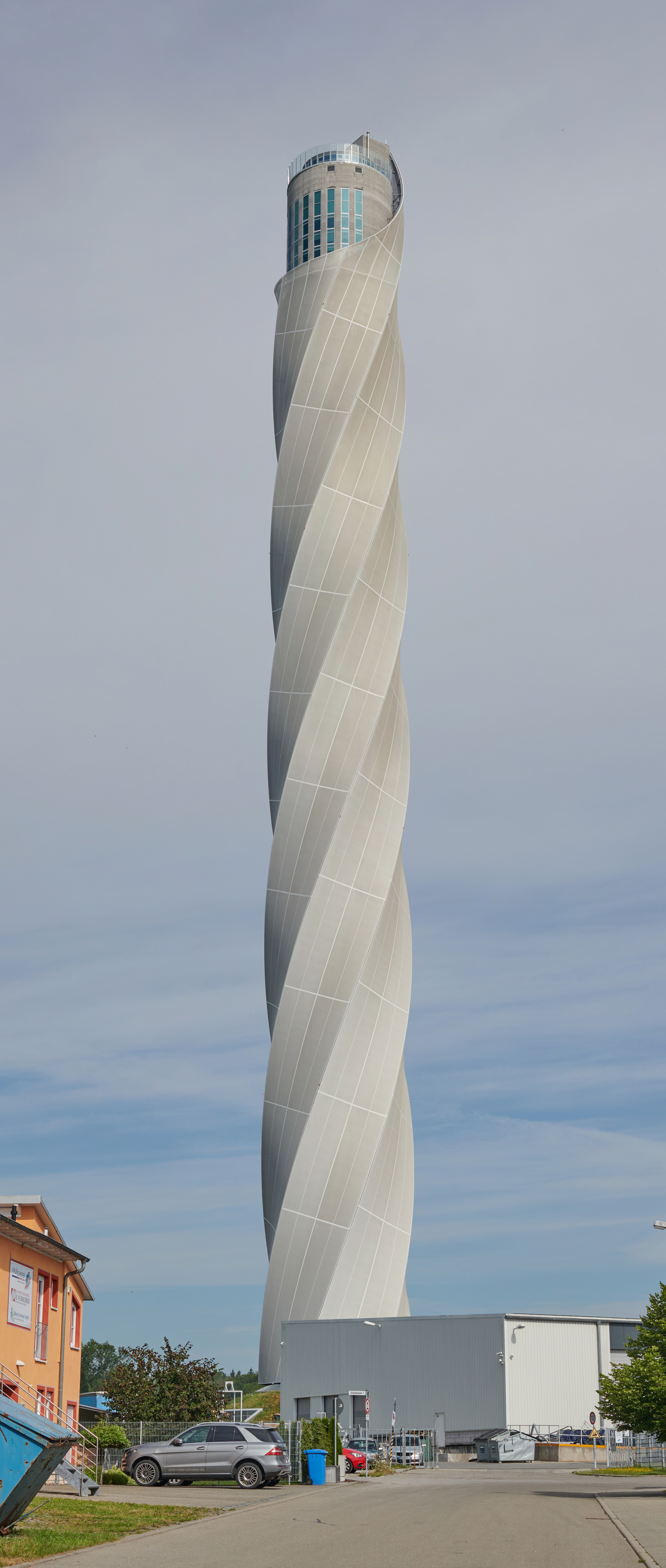
- Interactive map of the TK Elevator Test Tower area
- Former names: thyssenkrupp Test Tower (2016-2021)
- Alternative names: Tower of Light

General information
- Status: Completed
- Type: Concrete tower
- Location: Rottweil, Germany
- Coordinates: 48.179119°N 8.62518°E
- Construction started: 2014
- Completed: 2017
- Owner: TK Elevator

Height
- Architectural: 246 m (807 ft)
- Observatory: 232 m (761 ft)

Website
- Website

The TK Elevator Test Tower (TK-Elevator-Testturm) is an elevator test tower in Rottweil, Germany. It is owned by TK Elevator, who have their elevator research campus nearby. It stands 246 m (807 ft) tall and was built to test the company's MULTI elevator system. At 232 m (761 ft), the tower contains Germany's tallest observation deck. Completed in 2017, it was then the tallest elevator test tower in the world, as well as the second-largest elevator test chamber (next to a former mine shaft used by Kone).
