= Spring Valley, California =

Spring Valley, California may refer to:

- Spring Valley, San Diego County, California, census-designated place
- Spring Valley, Butte County, California, former mining camp
- Spring Valley, El Dorado County, California, unincorporated community
- Spring Valley, Lake County, California, census-designated place
- Valley Springs, California, in Calaveras County, formerly called Spring Valley
