= Inazawa =

Inazawa 稲沢市
- City
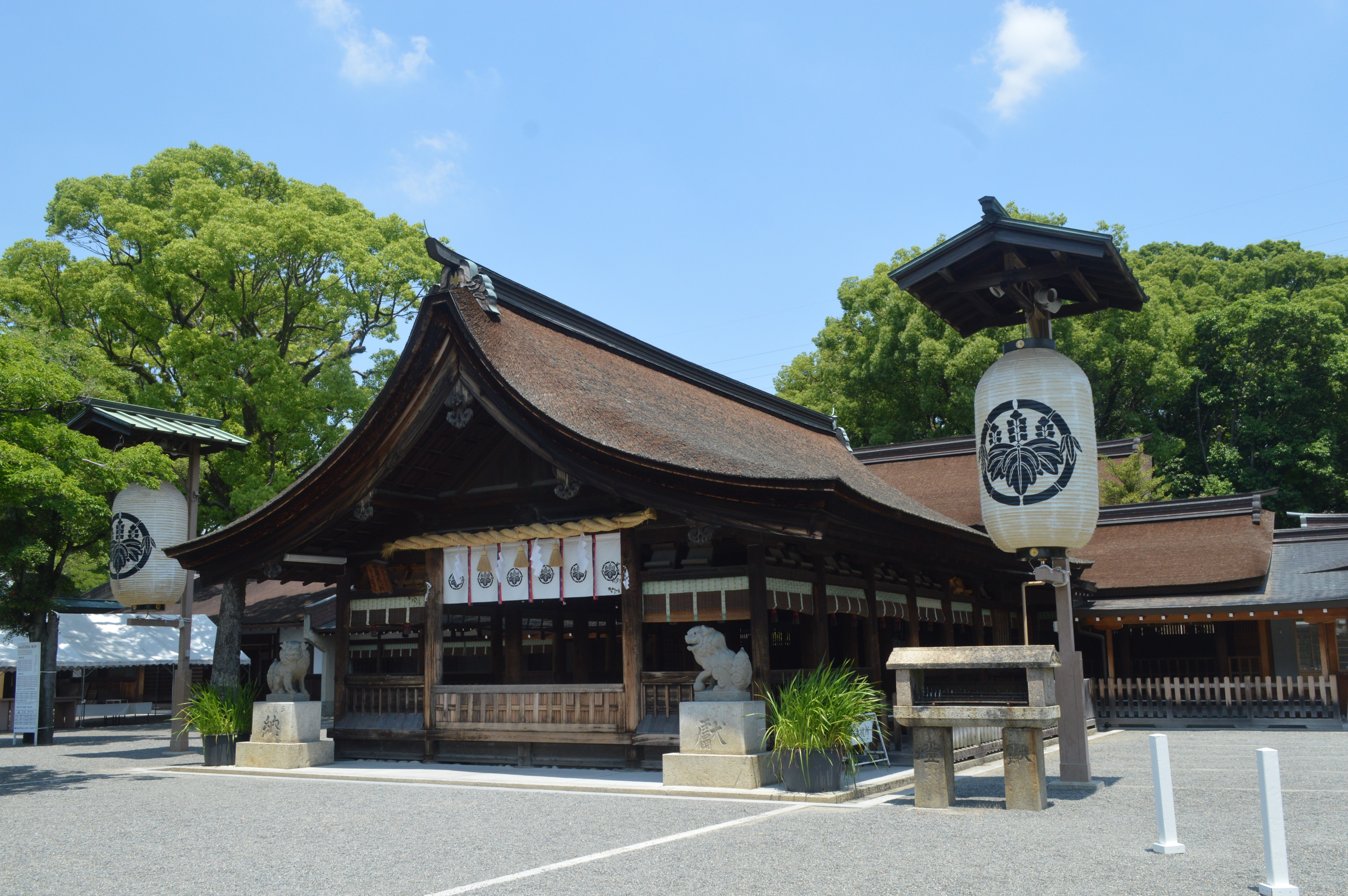
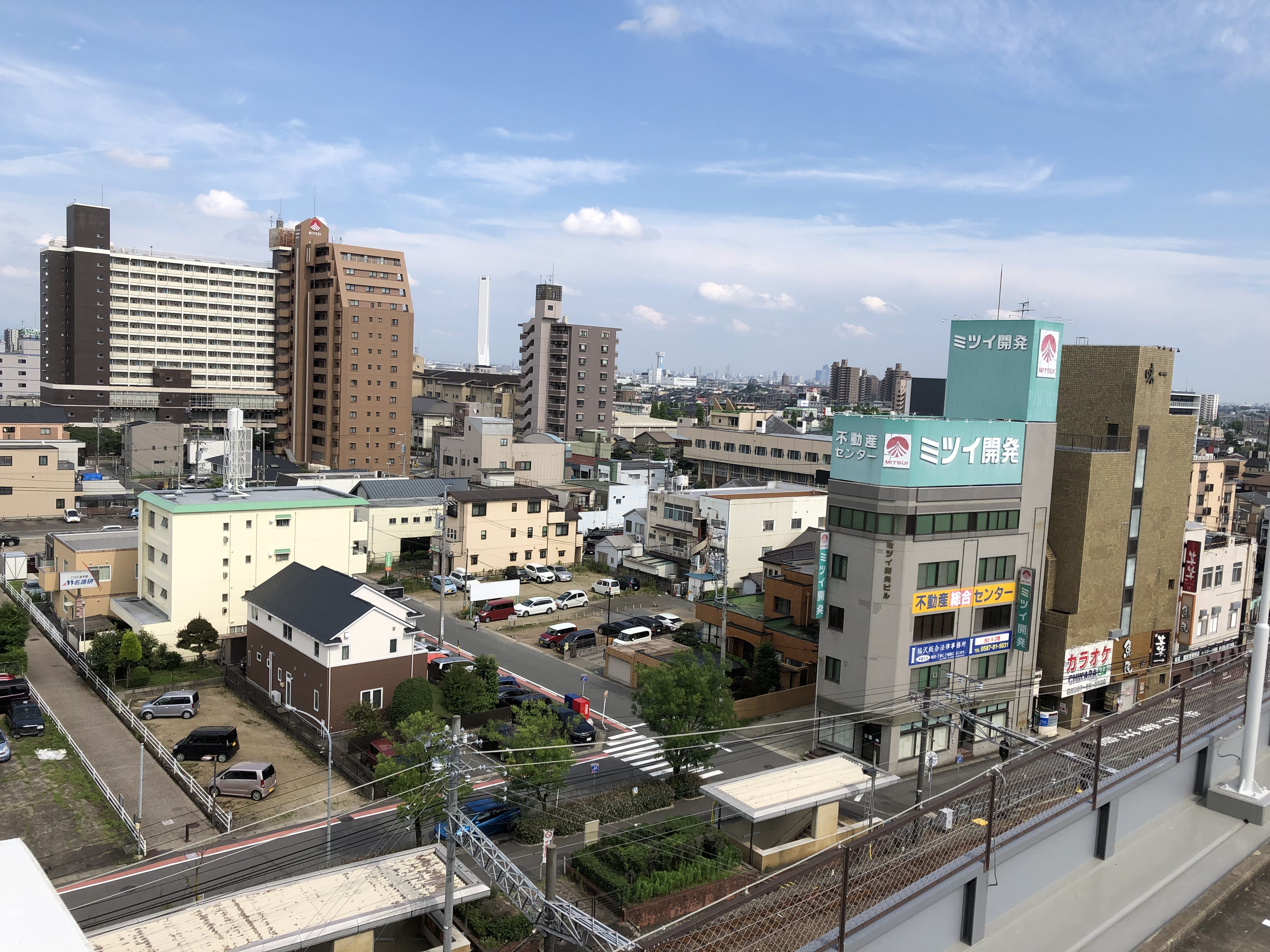
- Upper stage:Owari ōkunitama-jinja Lower stage:Inazawa Skyline

- Flag Seal

- Location of Inazawa in Aichi Prefecture

- Coordinates: 35°15′53″N 136°47′48.9″E
- Country: Japan
- Region: Chūbu (Tōkai)
- Prefecture: Aichi

Government
  - Mayor: Toshiaki Ōno

Area
  - Total: 79.35 km^{2} (30.64 sq mi)

Population (October 1, 2019)
  - Total: 135,580
  - Density: 1,709/km^{2} (4,425/sq mi)
- Time zone: UTC+9 (Japan Standard Time)
  - Tree: Pine
  - Flower: Chrysanthemum
- Phone number: 0587-32-1111
- Address: 1 Inabuchō, Inazawa-shi, Aichi-ken 492-8269
- Website: Official website

Inazawa (稲沢市, Inazawa-shi; Japanese pronunciation: [ì.nä́.(d͡)zä́.β̞ä́(.ɕì)]) is a city located in Aichi Prefecture, Japan. As of 1 October 2019, the city had an estimated population of 135,580 in 54,999 households, and a population density of 1,709 inhabitants per square kilometre (4,430/sq mi). The total area of the city was 79.35 km^{2} (30.64 sq mi).

== Geography ==
Inazawa is located in the flatlands of far western Aichi Prefecture, bordering Gifu Prefecture on the west. Both the Kiso River and the Gojō River flow through the city.

=== Climate ===
The city has a climate characterized by hot and humid summers, and relatively mild winters (Köppen climate classification Cfa). The average annual temperature in Inazawa is 15.6 °C (60.1 °F). The average annual rainfall is 1,758 mm (69.2 in) with September as the wettest month. The temperatures are highest on average in August, at around 27.9 °C (82.2 °F), and lowest in January, at around 4.4 °C (39.9 °F).

=== Demographics ===
Per Japanese census data, the population of Inazawa has been relatively steady over the past 30 years.

Historical population
Year	Pop.	±%
1940	56,321	—
1950	71,370	+26.7%
1960	79,847	+11.9%
1970	110,629	+38.6%
1980	126,023	+13.9%
1990	132,483	+5.1%
2000	136,928	+3.4%
2010	136,415	−0.4%

=== Surrounding municipalities ===
Aichi Prefecture

- Aisai
- Ama
- Ichinomiya
- Kiyosu

Gifu Prefecture

- Hashima
- Kaizu

== History ==
=== Ancient history ===
Inazawa is the location of the Nara period provincial capital and provincial temple of Owari Province.

The Owari Onkunitama Jinja, an important Shinto shrine located within the borders of the present city, also dates from this period.

=== Early modern period ===
During the Edo period, Inaba and Ozawa villages formed a post town on the Minoji, a kaidō connecting Miya-juku (Atsuta on the Tōkaidō to Tarui-juku (Mino Province) on the Nakasendō.

=== Late modern period ===
In the early Meiji period establishment of the modern municipalities system, the town of Inazawa was created.

=== Contemporary history ===
The area of the town was expanded in 1907 and 1955 through the annexation of neighboring villages, and on November 1, 1958, the Inazawa was elevated to city status.

On April 1, 2005, the towns of Heiwa and Sobue (both from Nakashima District) were merged into Inazawa.

== Government ==
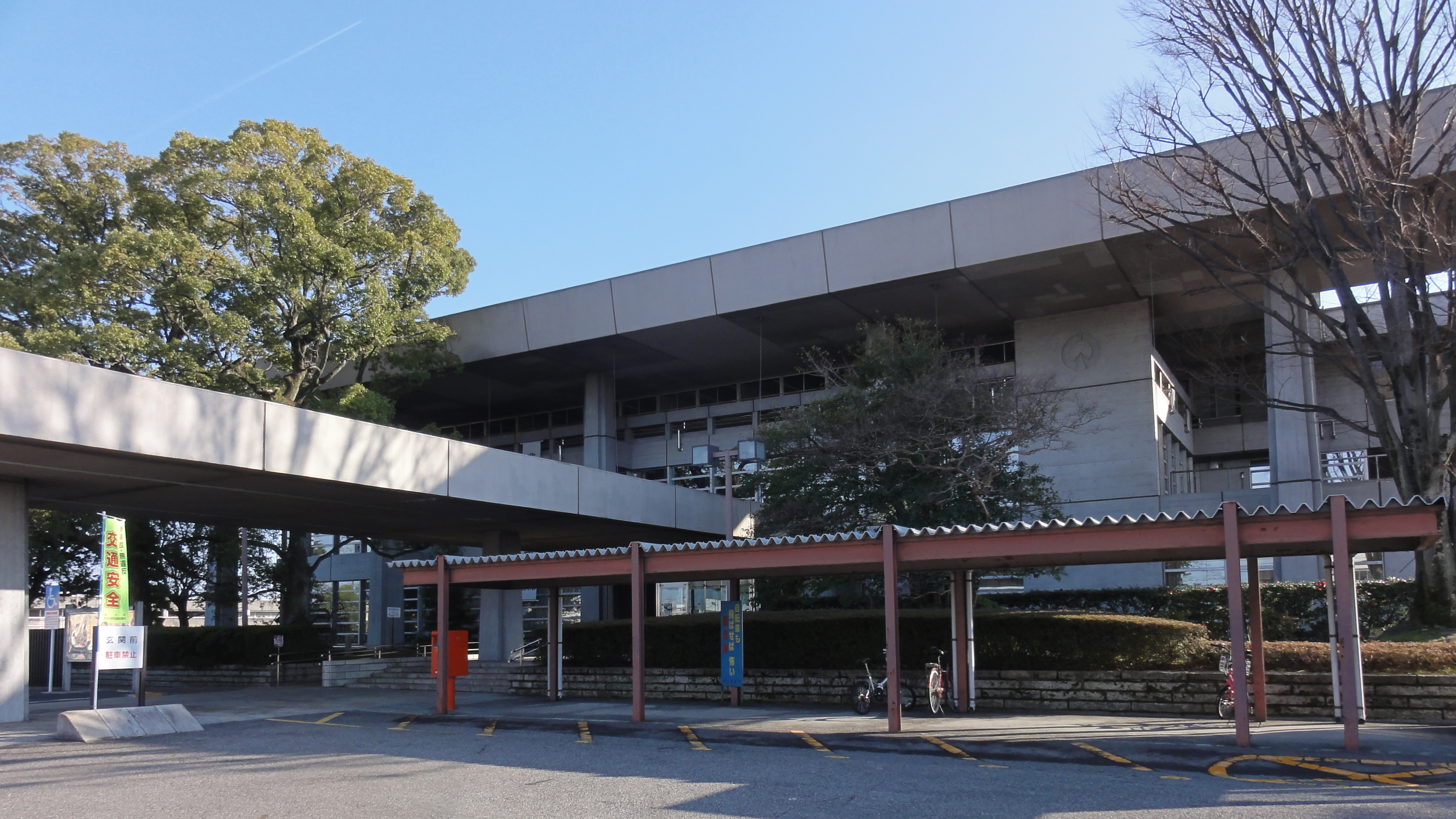
Inazawa City hall

Inazawa has a mayor-council form of government with a directly elected mayor and a unicameral city legislature of 26 members. The city contributes two members to the Aichi Prefectural Assembly. In terms of national politics, the city is part of Aichi District 9 of the lower house of the Diet of Japan.

== Sister cities ==
- Olympia, Greece, since August 22, 1987
- Chifeng, China, since May 16, 1989.

== Education ==
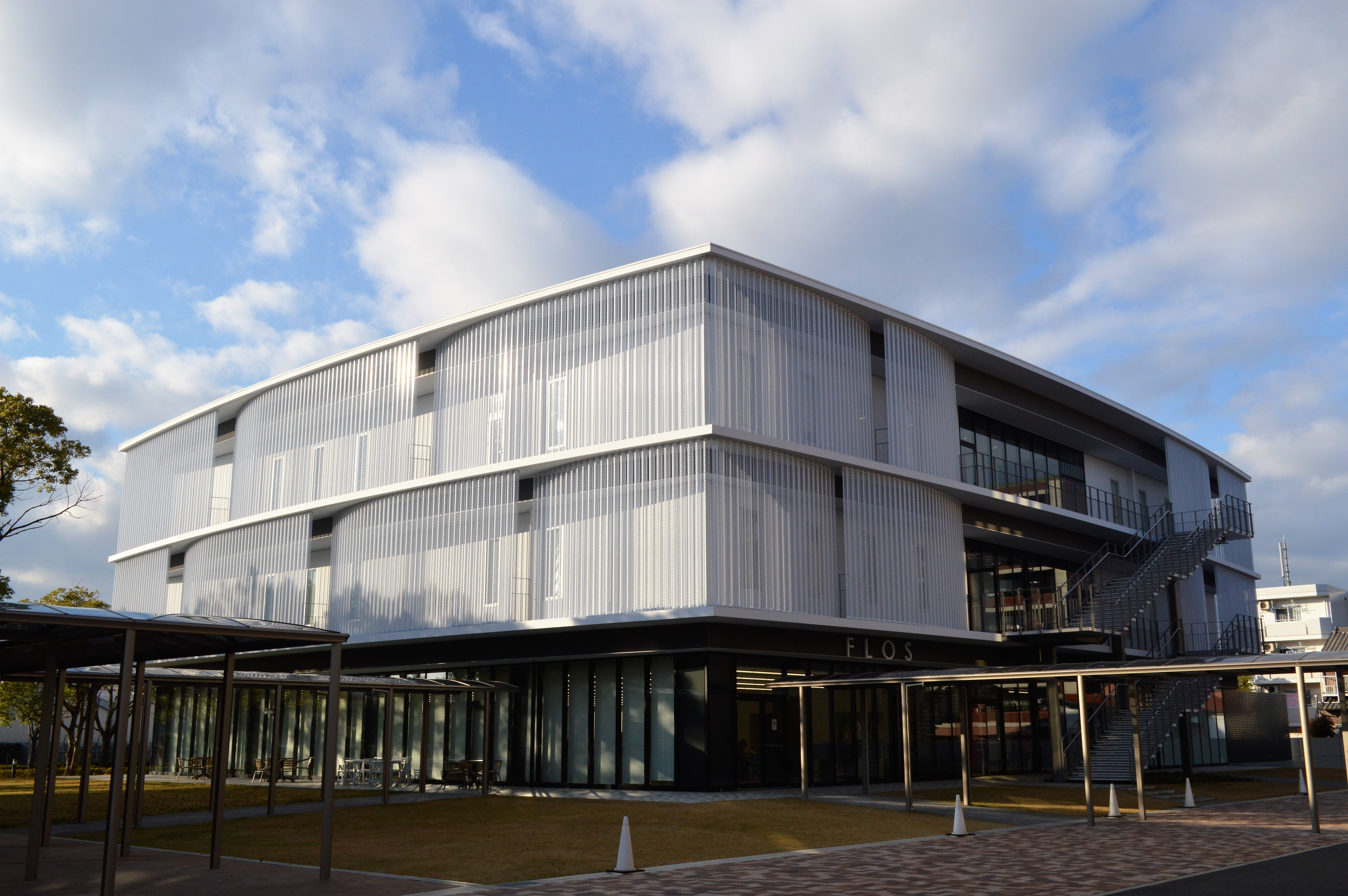
Nagoya Bunri University

=== University ===
- Nagoya Bunri University

=== College ===
- Aichi Bunkyo Women's College

=== Schools ===
Inazawa has 23 public elementary schools and nine public junior high schools operated by the city government, and three public high schools operated by the Aichi Prefectural Board of Education. There are also one private high school. The prefecture also operates one special education school for the handicapped.

== Economy ==
=== Primary sector of the economy ===
==== Agriculture ====
Inazawa is a regional commercial center and has traditionally been known for its production of vegetables and ginkgo nuts.

=== Secondary sector of the economy ===
==== Manufacturing ====
Sony and Toyoda Gosei have large production plants in the city.

=== Tertiary sector of the economy ===
==== Commerce ====
Due to its transportation connections with the Nagoya metropolis, Inazawa is increasingly becoming a commuter town.

=== Companies headquartered in Inazawa ===
- Aikoku Alpha Corporation, automotive components
- Fujikei Kyoi, sake brewing
- Toshin Housing Company, construction
- UNY, supermarket chain

== Transportation ==
=== Railways ===
==== Conventional lines ====
Central Japan Railway Company

- Tokaido Main Line: - Kiyosu – Inazawa –

Meitetsu

- Nagoya Main Line: - Ōsato – Okuda – Kōnomiya – Shima-Ujinaga –
- Bisai Line:- Rokuwa – (Fuchidaka) – Marubuchi – Kami-Marubuchi – Morikami – Yamazaki –

=== Roads ===
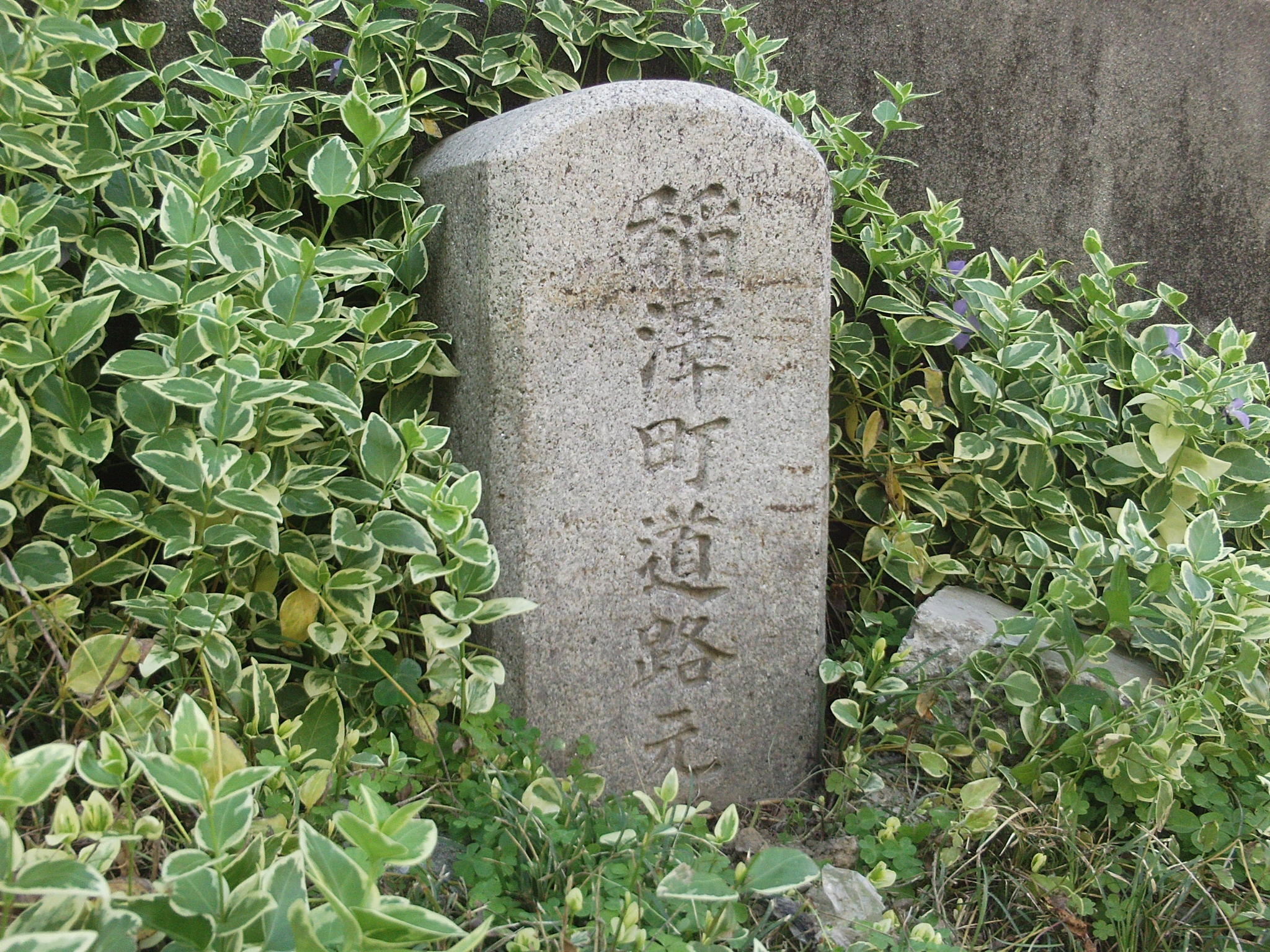
The Kilometre Zero of Inazawa

==== Expressways ====
- Meishin Expressway

==== Japan National Route ====
- National Route 155
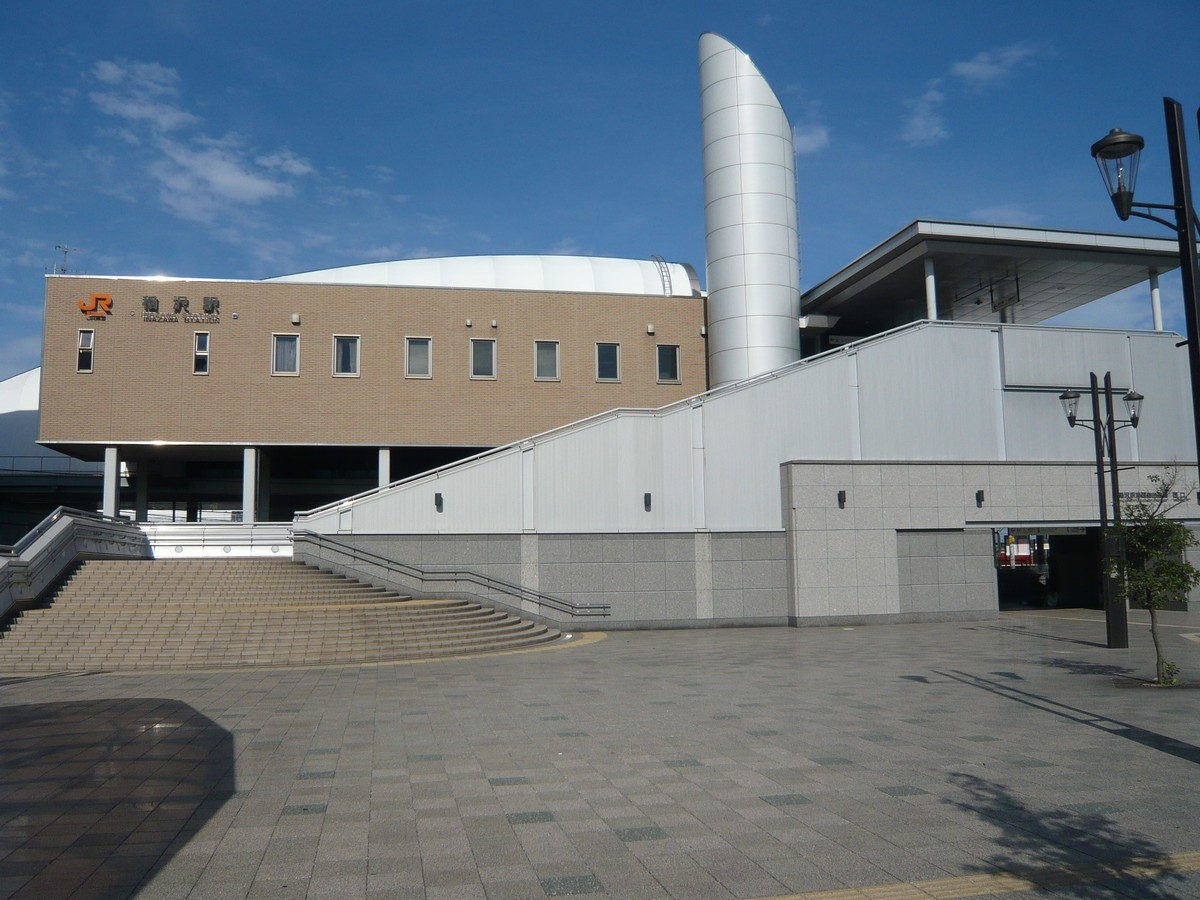
Inazawa Station

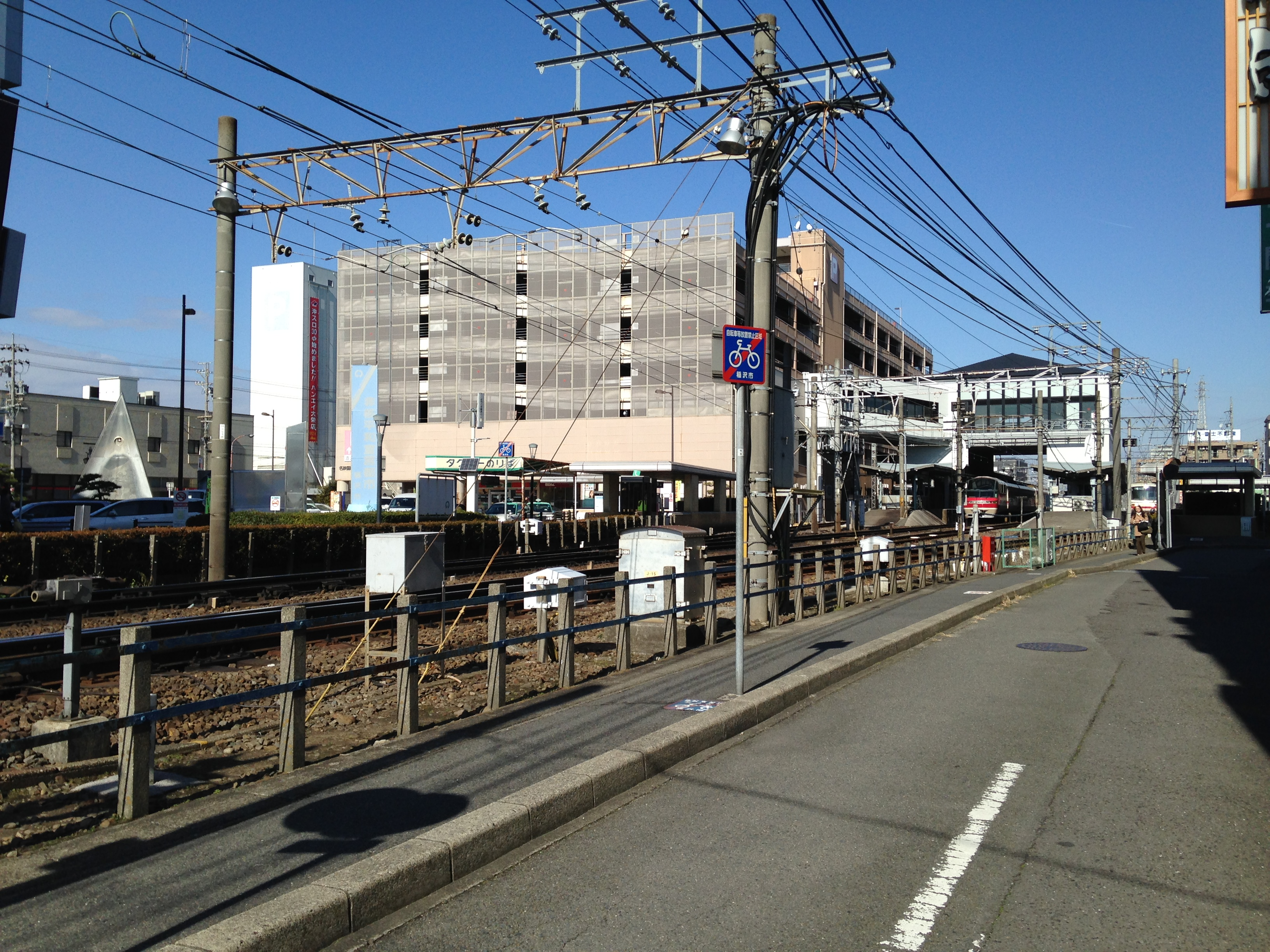
Kōnomiya Station

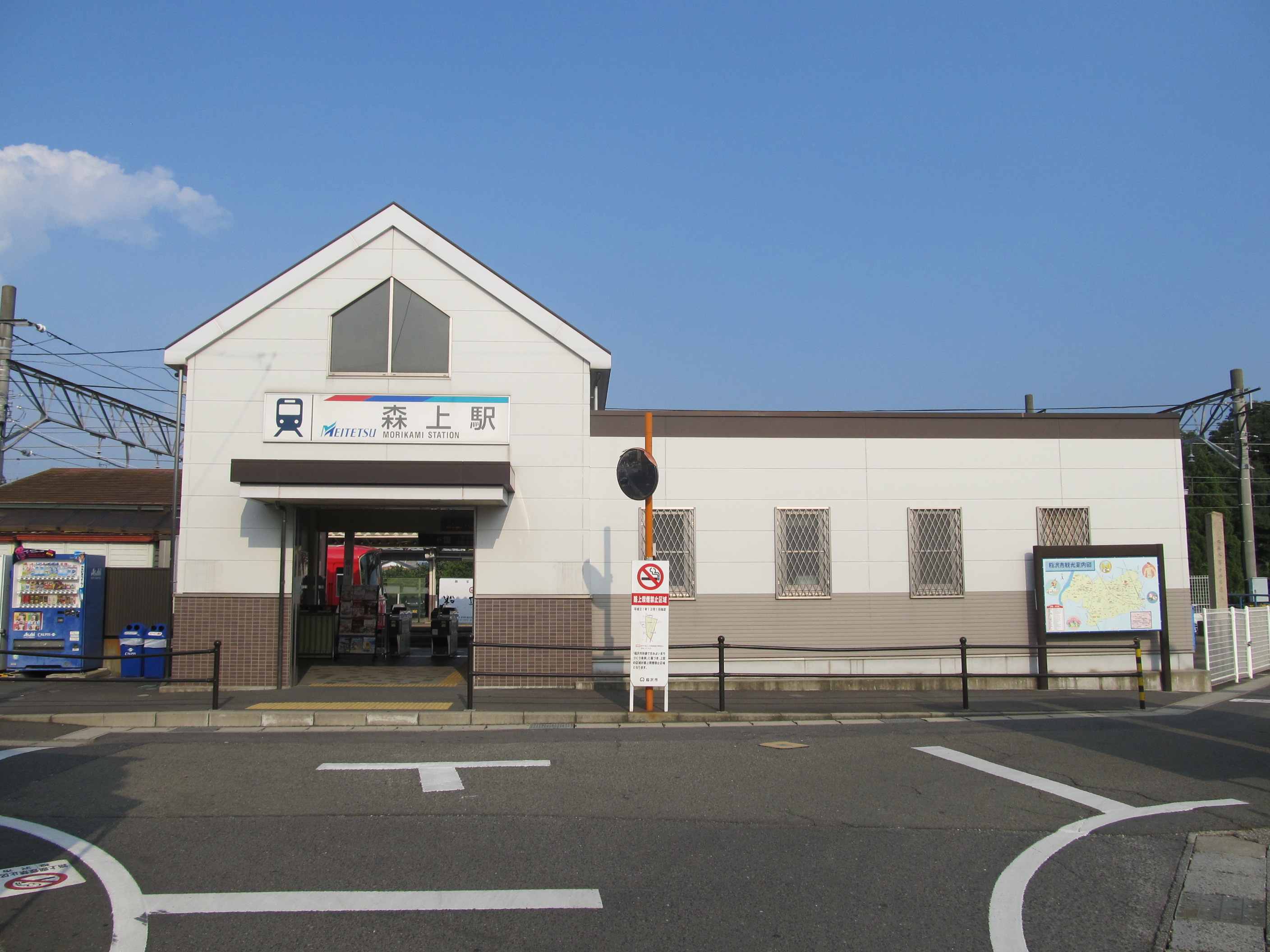
Morikami Station

== Local attractions ==
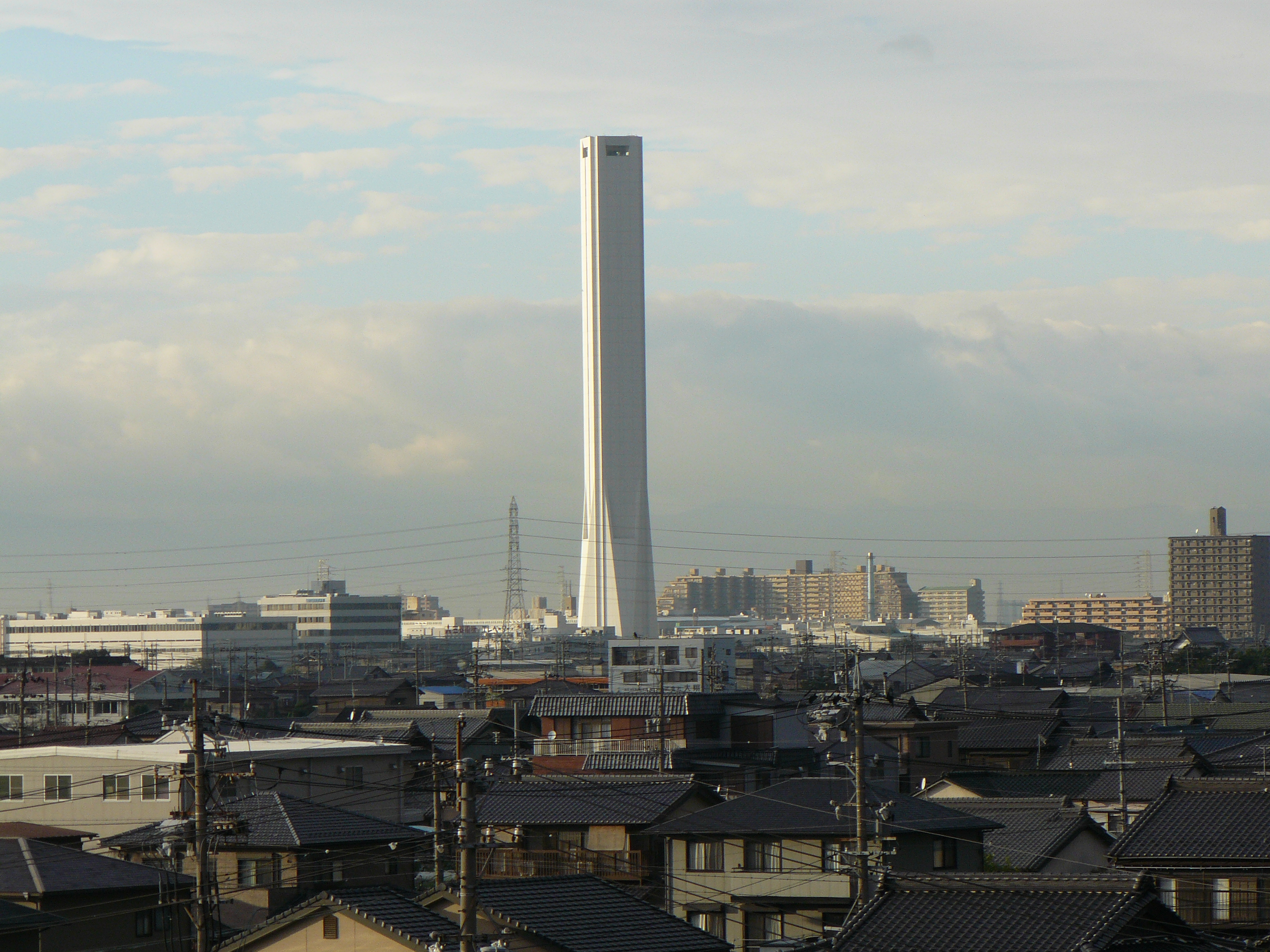
Solae (tower)

Castles

- Orizu Castle
- Shobata Castle

Shrines and Temples

- Owari Kokubun-ji
- Owari Ōkunitama Jinja
- Yawase Kannon Temple

Natural attractions

- Sobue Dune

Cultural events

- Hadaka Matsuri on the 12th day of the new Chinese Year

Buildings and structures

- Solae (tower) – Inazawa is the location of the Solae elevator testing tower, previously the highest such tower in the world, but now surpassed by the Kunshan Test Tower in China.
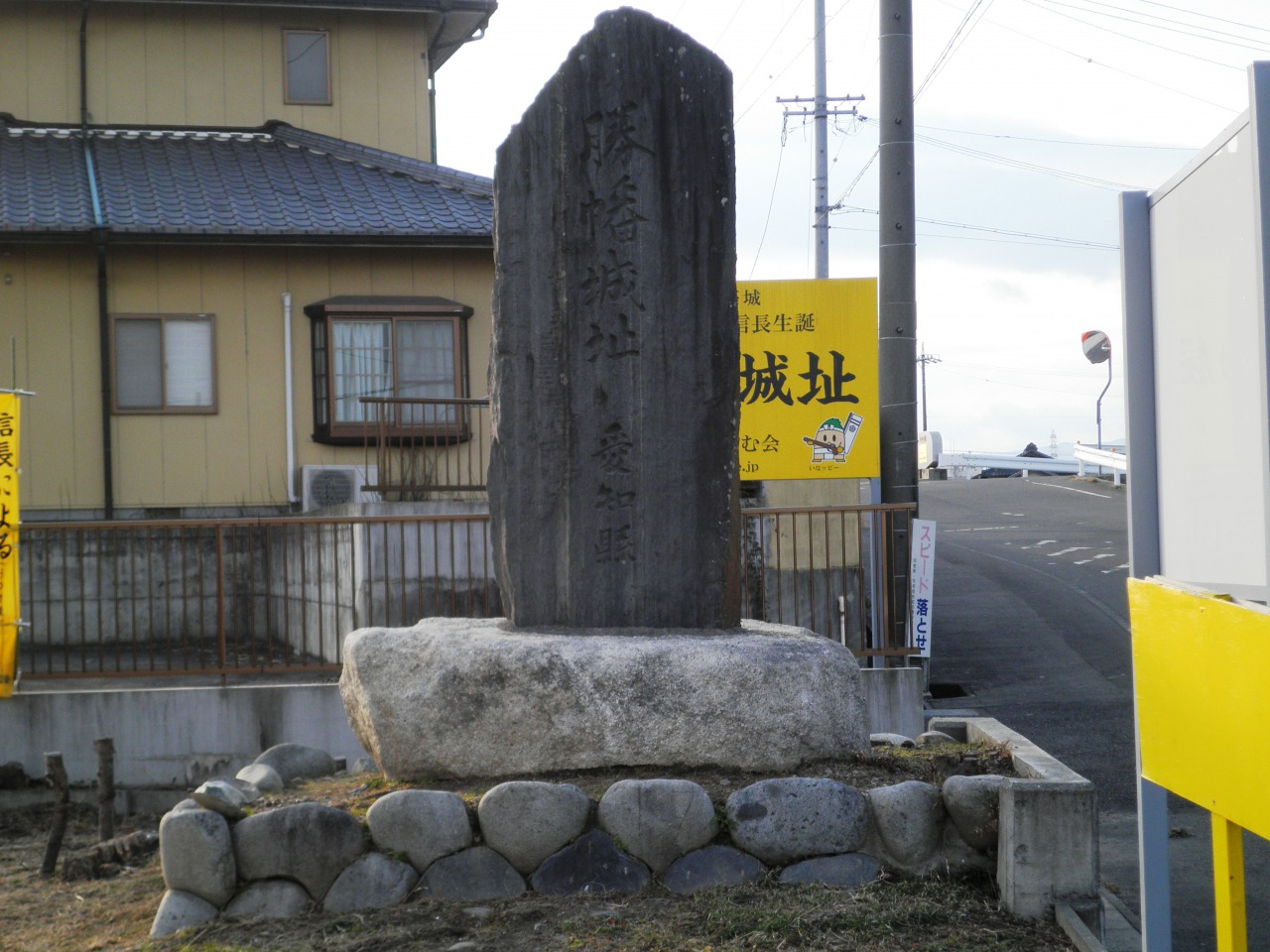
Shobata Castle

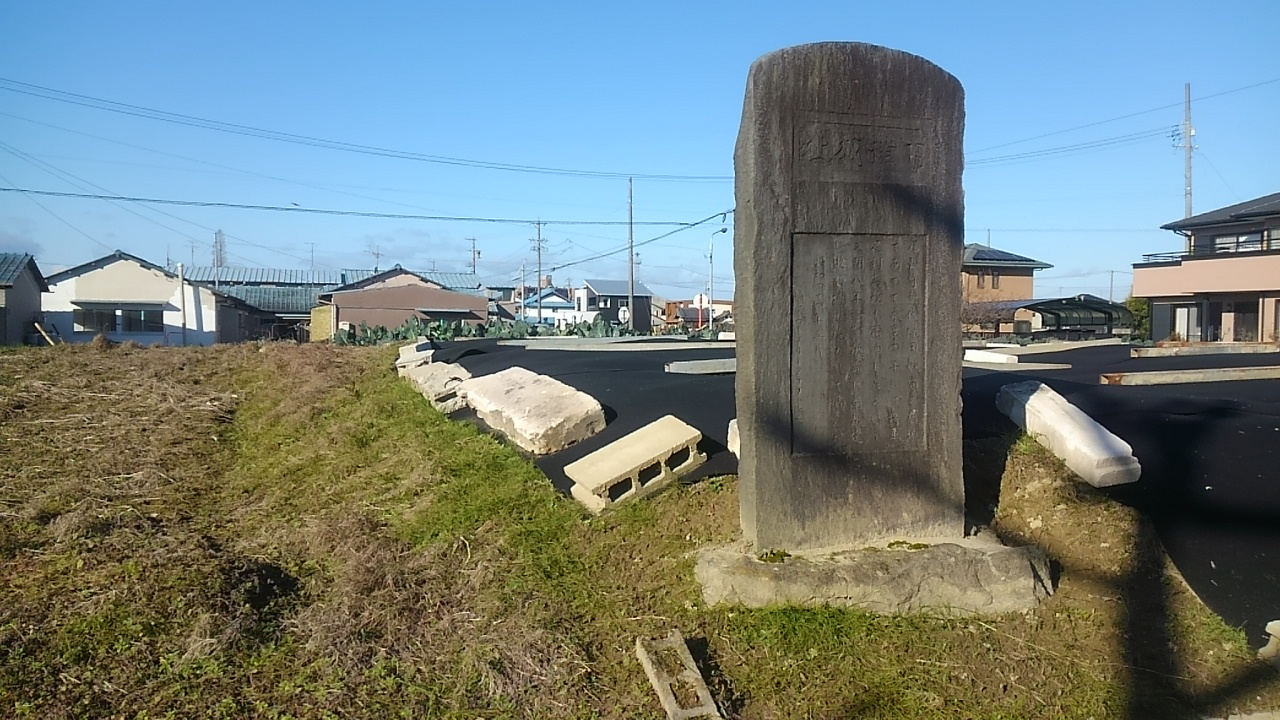
Orizu Castle

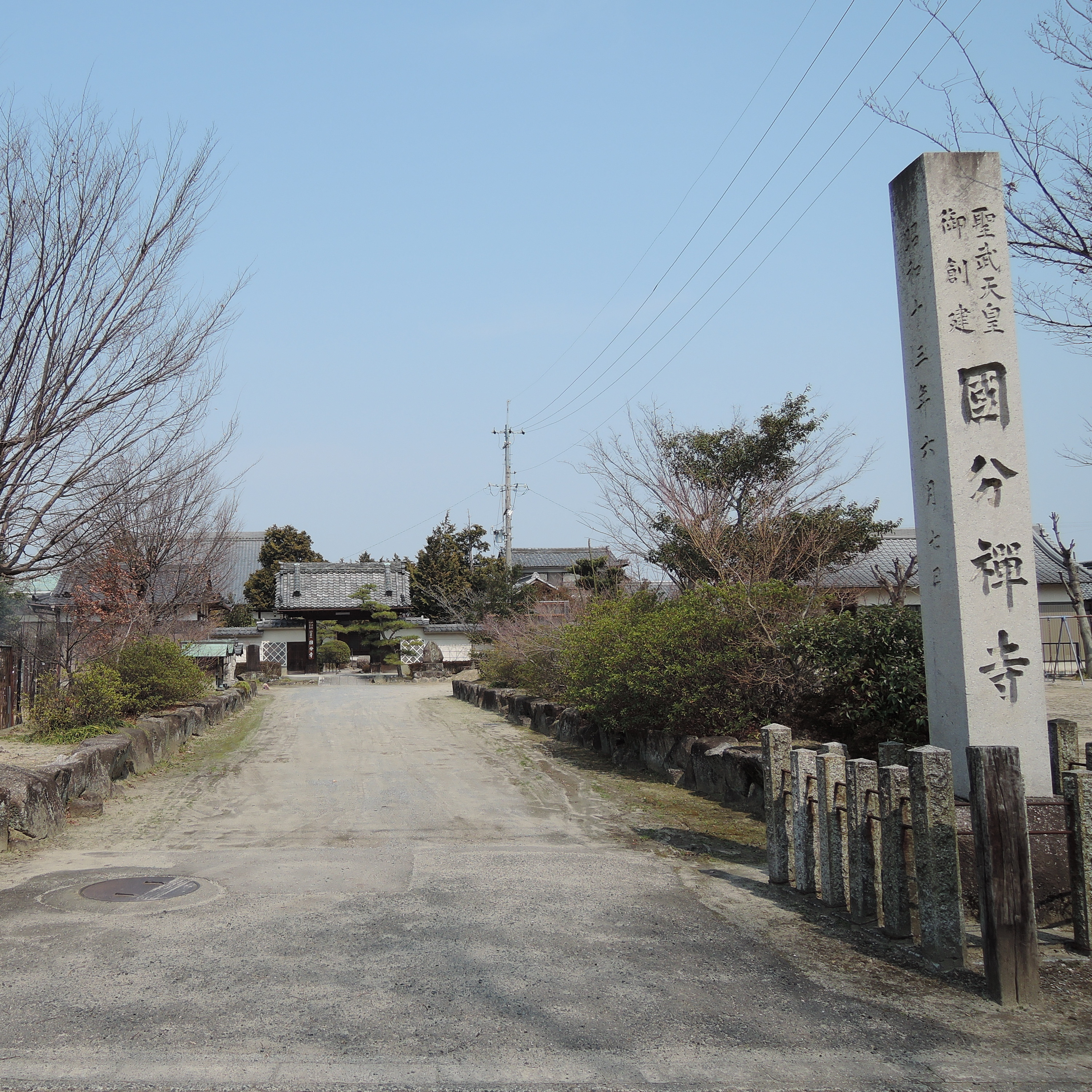
Owari Kokubun temple

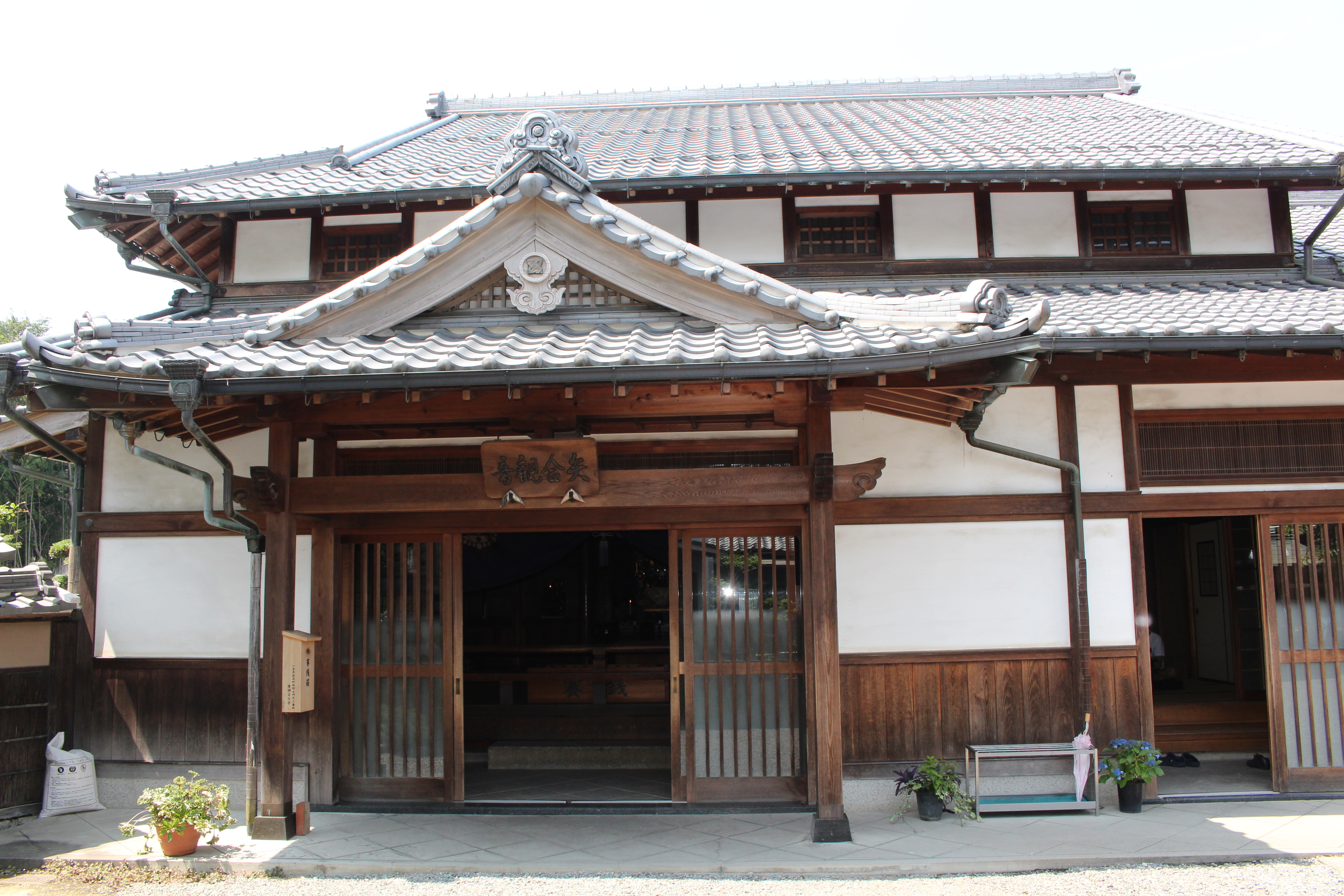
Yawase Kannon Temple

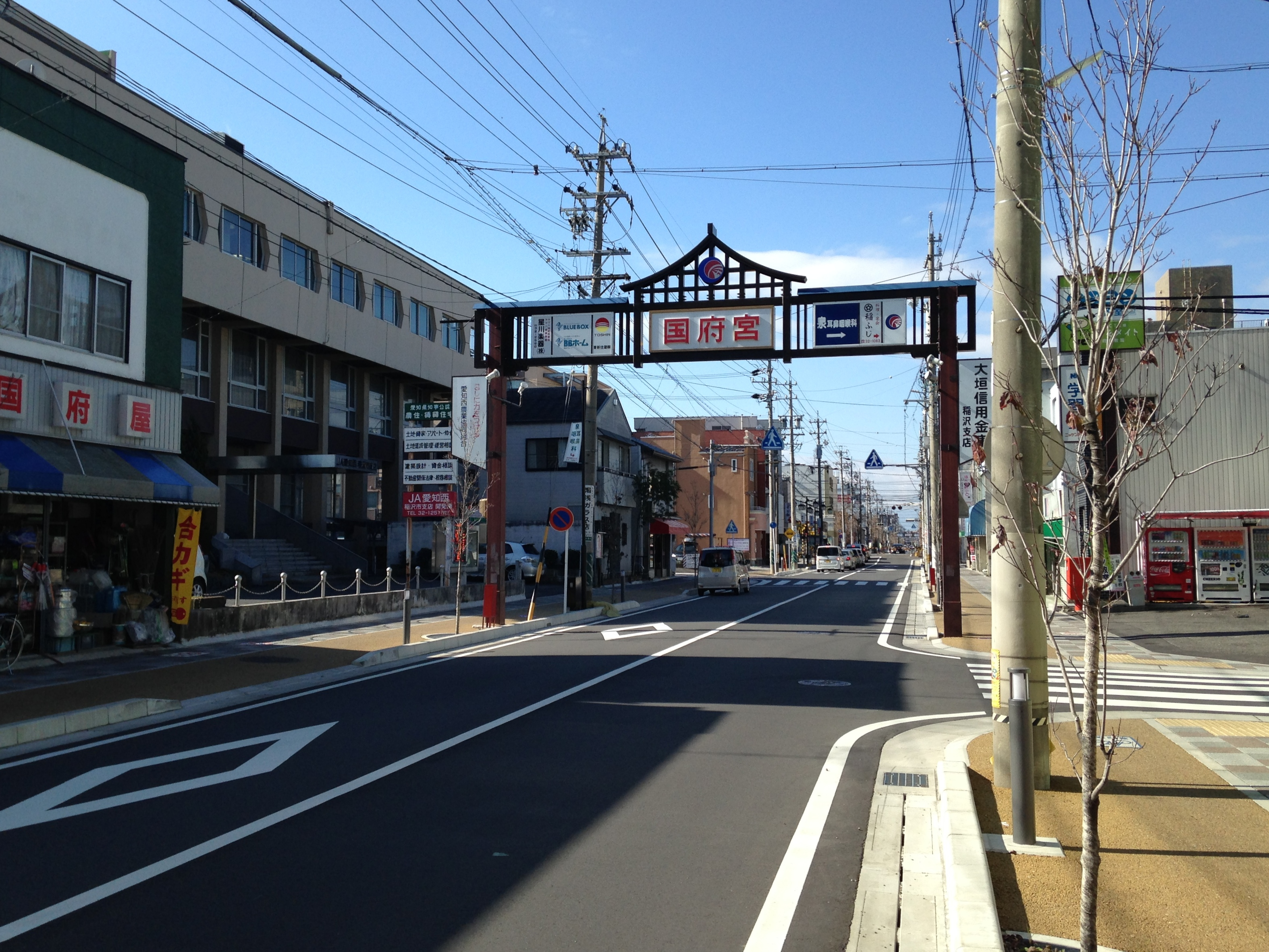
Konomiya Street

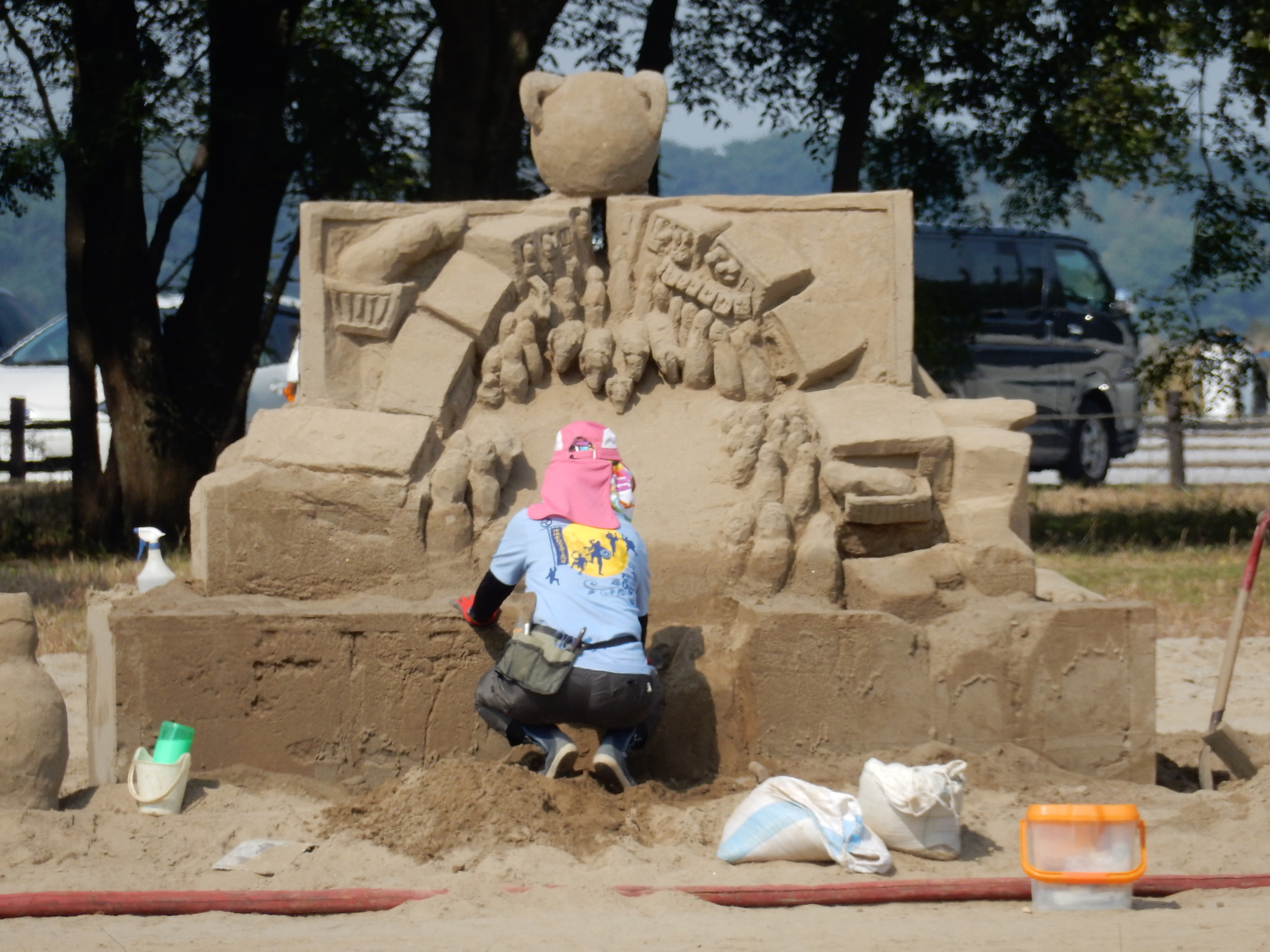
Sobue Dune

== Notable people from Inazawa ==
- Junki Ito, professional baseball player
- Masaichi Kaneda, professional baseball player
- Seiko Niizuma, actress and singer
- Takanori Ogisu, artist
- Mineo Ōsumi, admiral, Imperial Japanese Navy
- Wataru Sakata, professional wrestler
- Nana Seino, actress and model
