= Solae (tower) =

Elevator test tower in Inazawa, Japan

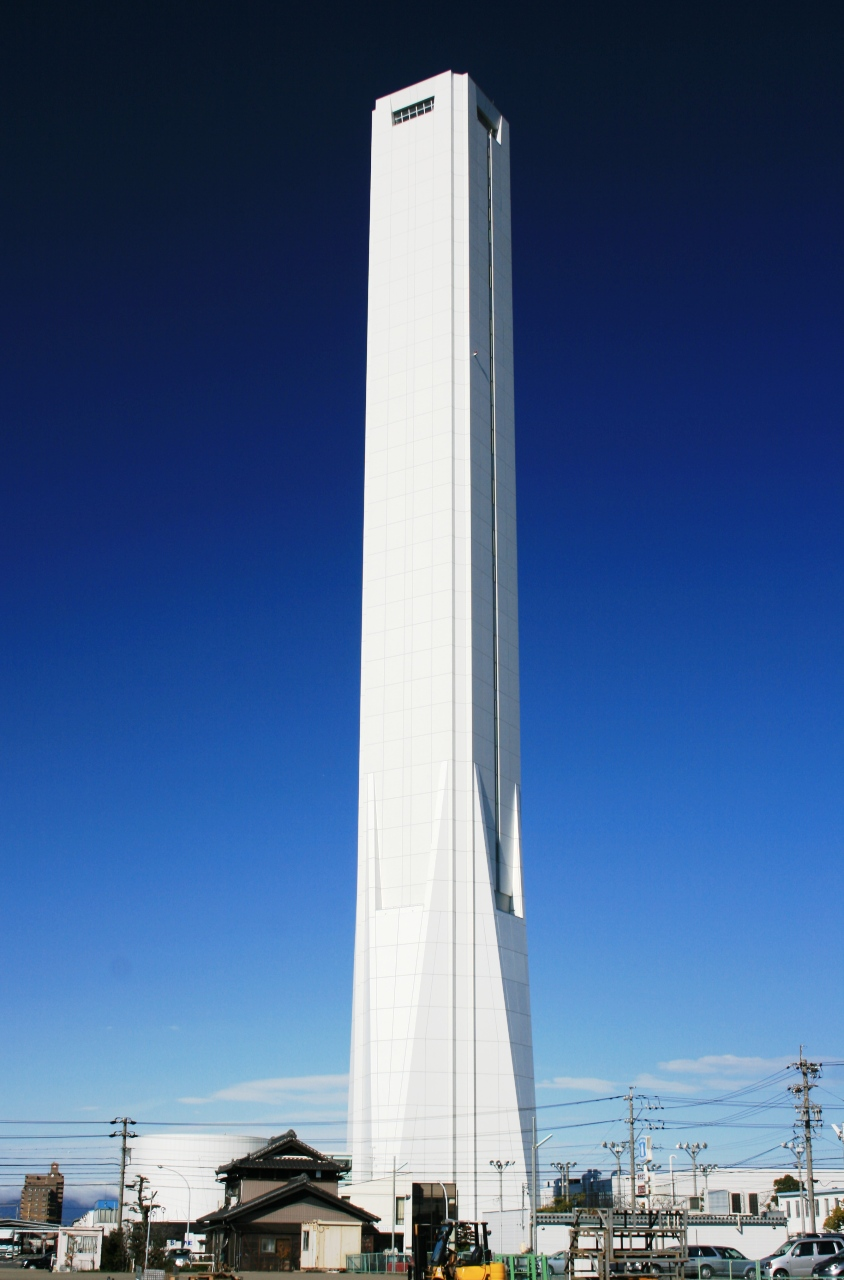
- The Mitsubishi Electric–owned Solae Test Tower

- Location within Aichi Prefecture Location within Japan

General information
- Location: Inazawa, Aichi, Japan
- Coordinates: 35°14′42″N 136°49′9.5″E
- Construction started: December 26, 2005
- Completed: September 26, 2007
- Owner: Mitsubishi Electric Building Solutions

Height
- Height: 173.0 m (567.6 ft)

The Solae is an elevator test tower located in the city of Inazawa, Japan. It is owned by Mitsubishi Electric. The tower is 173 metres (568 ft). When completed in 2007, it was the world's tallest elevator test tower. Since that time, the record has been broken by the Hyundai Eizan Tower (205 meters) in 2009, the Hitachi G1 Tower (213 meters) in 2010 and the Kunshan Test Tower in China (235 meters). This record was once again broken in 2017, with the completion of TK Elevator Test Tower in Rottweil, Germany (246 meters).
