= Marubuchi Station =

Railway station in Inazawa, Aichi Prefecture, Japan

Marubuchi Station 丸渕駅

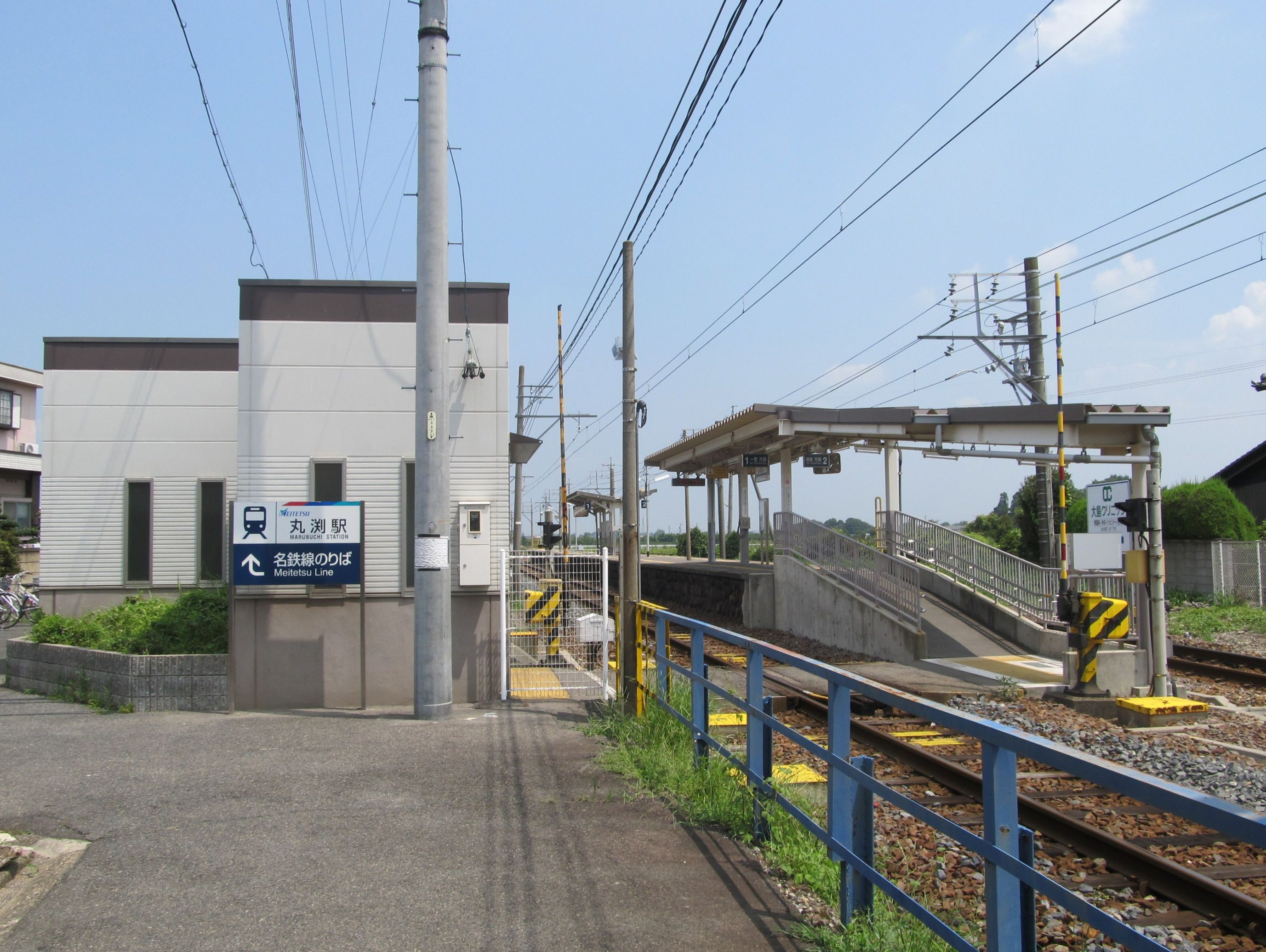
- Marubuchi Station in July 2013

General information
- Location: Ekidori Sobuecho Sanmarubuchi, Inazawa-shi, Aichi-ken 495-0021; Japan
- Coordinates: 35.2228°N 136.7291°E
- Operator: Meitetsu
- Line: ■ Bisai Line
- Distance: 13.4 kilometers from Yatomi
- Platforms: 1 island platform

Other information
- Status: Staffed
- Station code: BS04
- Website: Official website

History
- Opened: February 18, 1912

Passengers
- FY2017: 830 daily
Location
- Location within Aichi Prefecture Location within Japan

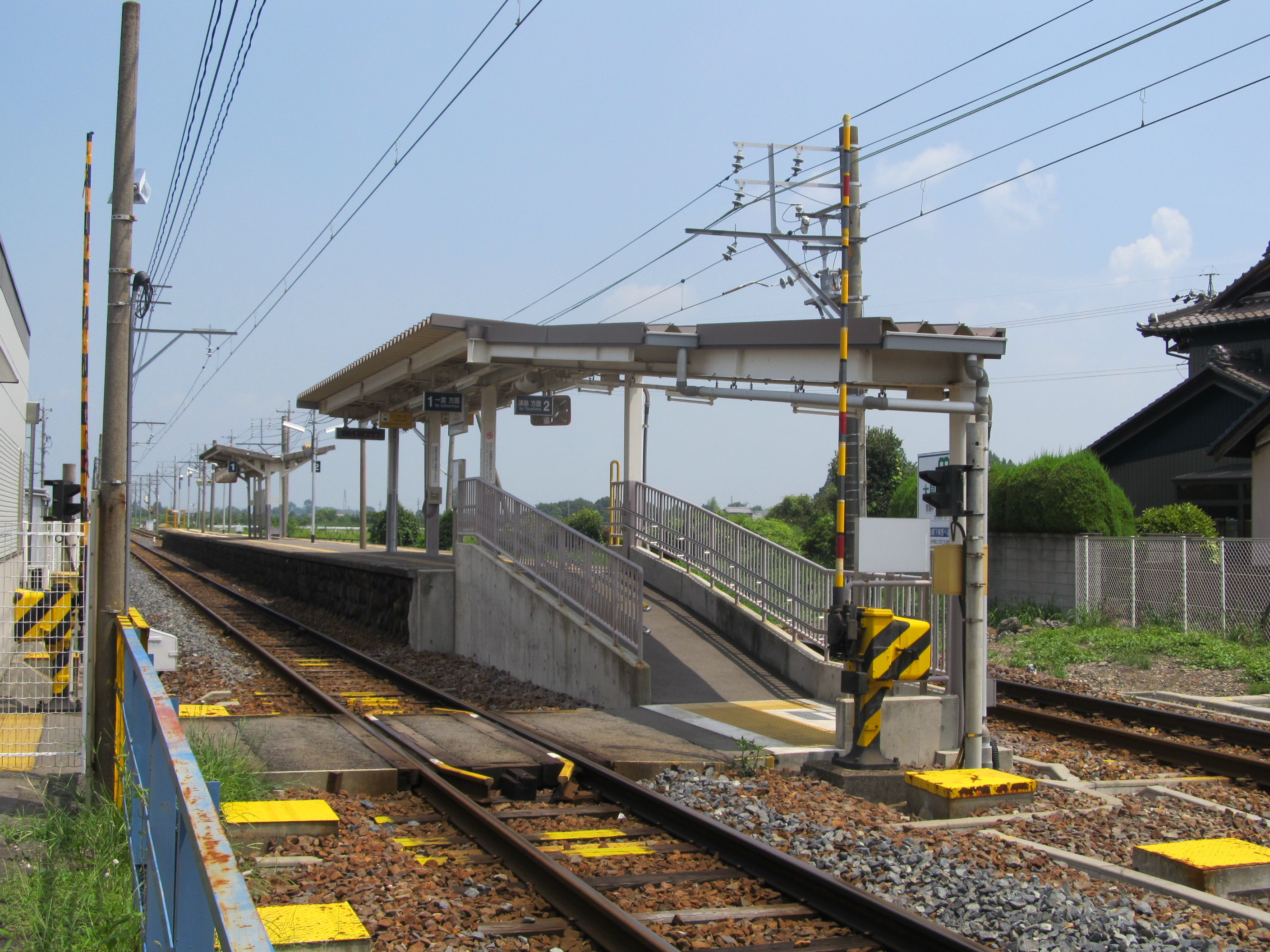
Platforms

Marubuchi Station (丸渕駅, Marubuchi-eki) is a railway station in the city of Inazawa, Aichi Prefecture, Japan, operated by Meitetsu.

== Lines ==
Marubuchi Station is served by the Meitetsu Bisai Line, and is located 13.4 kilometers from the starting point of the line at Yatomi.

== Station layout ==
The station has a single island platform, which is connected to the station building by a level crossing. The station has automated ticket machines, Manaca automated turnstiles and is staffed.

=== Platforms ===
1	■ Bisai Line	For Morikami and Meitetsu-Ichinomiya
2	■ Bisai Line	For Tsushima

== Adjacent stations ==
«	Service	»
Meitetsu
Bisai Line
Fuchidaka	-	Kami-Marubuchi

== Station history ==
Marubuchi Station was opened on February 18, 1912, as a station on the privately held Bisai Railroad, which was purchased by Meitetsu on August 1, 1925, becoming the Meitetsu Bisai Line. The station has been unattended since March 1971.

== Passenger statistics ==
In fiscal 2017, the station was used by an average of 830 passengers daily.

== Surrounding area ==
- Japan National Route 155

== See also ==
- List of railway stations in Japan
