= Rokuwa Station =

Railway station in Inazawa, Aichi Prefecture, Japan

Rokuwa Station 六輪駅

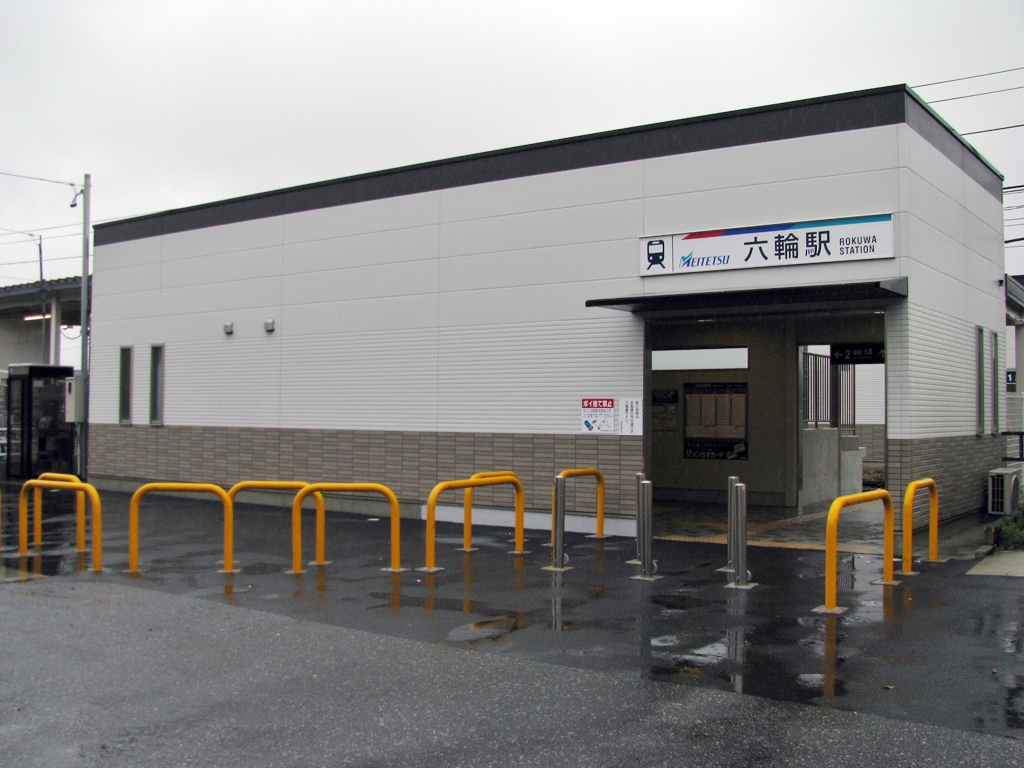
- Rokuwa Station in April 2004

General information
- Location: 426 Sukawaki Heiwa-cho Inazawa-shi, Aichi-ken 490-1323; Japan
- Coordinates: 35.2025°N 136.7295°E
- Operator: Meitetsu
- Line: ■ Bisai Line
- Distance: 11.1 kilometers from Yatomi
- Platforms: 2 side platforms

Other information
- Status: Unstaffed
- Station code: BS02
- Website: Official website

History
- Opened: February 17, 1899

Passengers
- FY2017: 1,034 daily
Location
- Location within Aichi Prefecture Location within Japan

Rokuwa Station (六輪駅, Rokuwa-eki) is a railway station in the city of Inazawa, Aichi Prefecture, Japan, operated by Meitetsu.

== Lines ==
Rokuwa Station is served by the Meitetsu Bisai Line, and is located 11.1 kilometers from the starting point of the line at Yatomi.

== Station layout ==
The station has two opposed side platforms connected by a level crossing. The station has automated ticket machines, Manaca automated turnstiles and is unattended.

=== Platforms ===
1	■ Bisai Line	For Morikami and Meitetsu-Ichinomiya
2	■ Bisai Line	For Tsushima

== Adjacent stations ==
«	Service	»
Meitetsu
Bisai Line
Machikata	-	Fuchidaka

== Station history ==
Rokuwa Station was opened on February 17, 1899 as a station on the privately held Bisai Railroad, which was purchased by Meitetsu on August 1, 1925 becoming the Meitetsu Bisai Line. The station has been unattended since May 1983.

== Passenger statistics ==
In fiscal 2017, the station was used by an average of 1,034 passengers daily.

== Surrounding area ==
- Japan National Route 155
- Kyowa High School

== See also ==
- List of railway stations in Japan
