= Kami-Marubuchi Station =

Railway station in Inazawa, Aichi Prefecture, Japan

Kami-Marubuchi Station 上丸渕駅

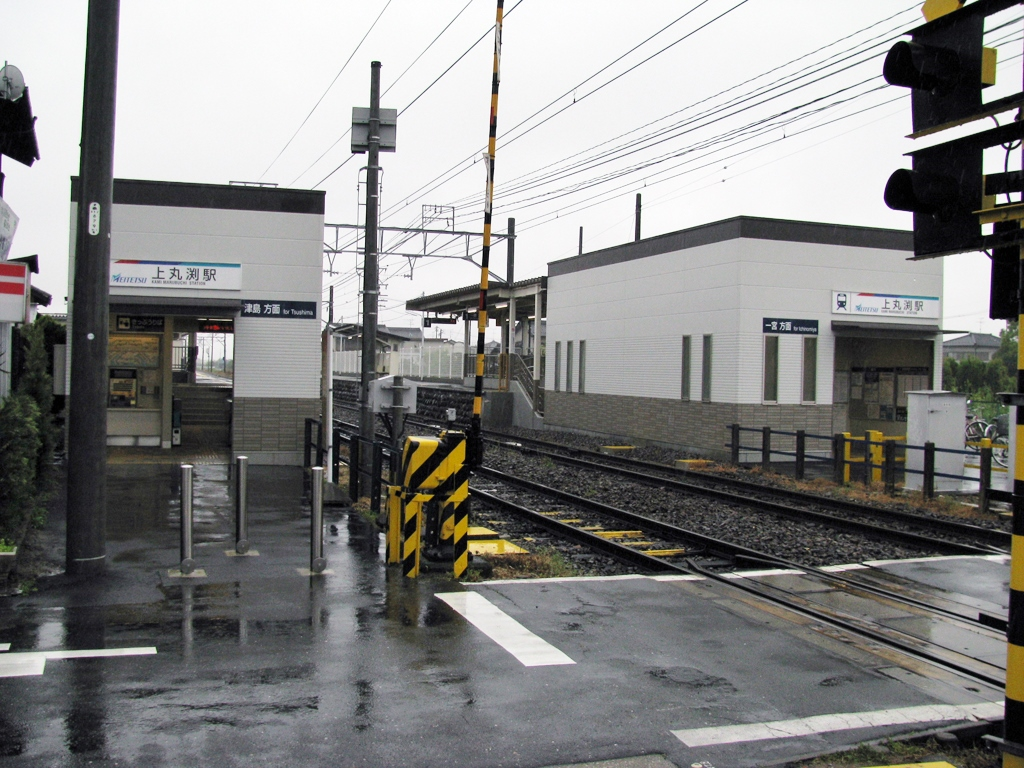
- Kami-Marubuchi Station in April 2009

General information
- Location: Gomae Sobuecho Sanmarubuchi, Inazawa-shi, Aichi-ken 495-0021; Japan
- Coordinates: 35.2340°N 136.7324°E
- Operator: Meitetsu
- Line: ■ Bisai Line
- Distance: 14.7 kilometers from Yatomi
- Platforms: 2 side platforms

Other information
- Status: Unstaffed
- Station code: BS05
- Website: Official website

History
- Opened: February 17, 1899

Passengers
- FY2017: 1,080 daily
Location
- Location within Aichi Prefecture Location within Japan

Kami-Marubuchi Station (上丸渕駅, Kami-Marubuchi-eki) is a railway station in the city of Inazawa, Aichi Prefecture, Japan, operated by Meitetsu.

== Lines ==
Kami-Marubuchi Station is served by the Meitetsu Bisai Line, and is located 14.7 kilometers from the starting point of the line at Yatomi.

== Station layout ==
The station has dual opposed side platforms, connected by a level crossing. The station has automated ticket machines, Manaca automated turnstiles and is unattended.

=== Platforms ===
1	■ Bisai Line	For Meitetsu-Ichinomiya
2	■ Bisai Line	For Tsushima

== Adjacent stations ==
«	Service	»
Meitetsu
Bisai Line
Marubuchi	-	Morikami

== Station history ==
Kami-Marubuchi Station was opened on February 17, 1899 as a station on the privately held Bisai Railroad, which was purchased by Meitetsu on August 1, 1925 becoming the Meitetsu Bisai Line. The station has been unattended since March 1971.

== Passenger statistics ==
In fiscal 2017, the station was used by an average of 1,080 passengers daily.

== Surrounding area ==
- Japan National Route 155

== See also ==
- List of railway stations in Japan
