= Machikata Station =

Railway station in Aisai, Aichi Prefecture, Japan

Machikata Station 町方駅

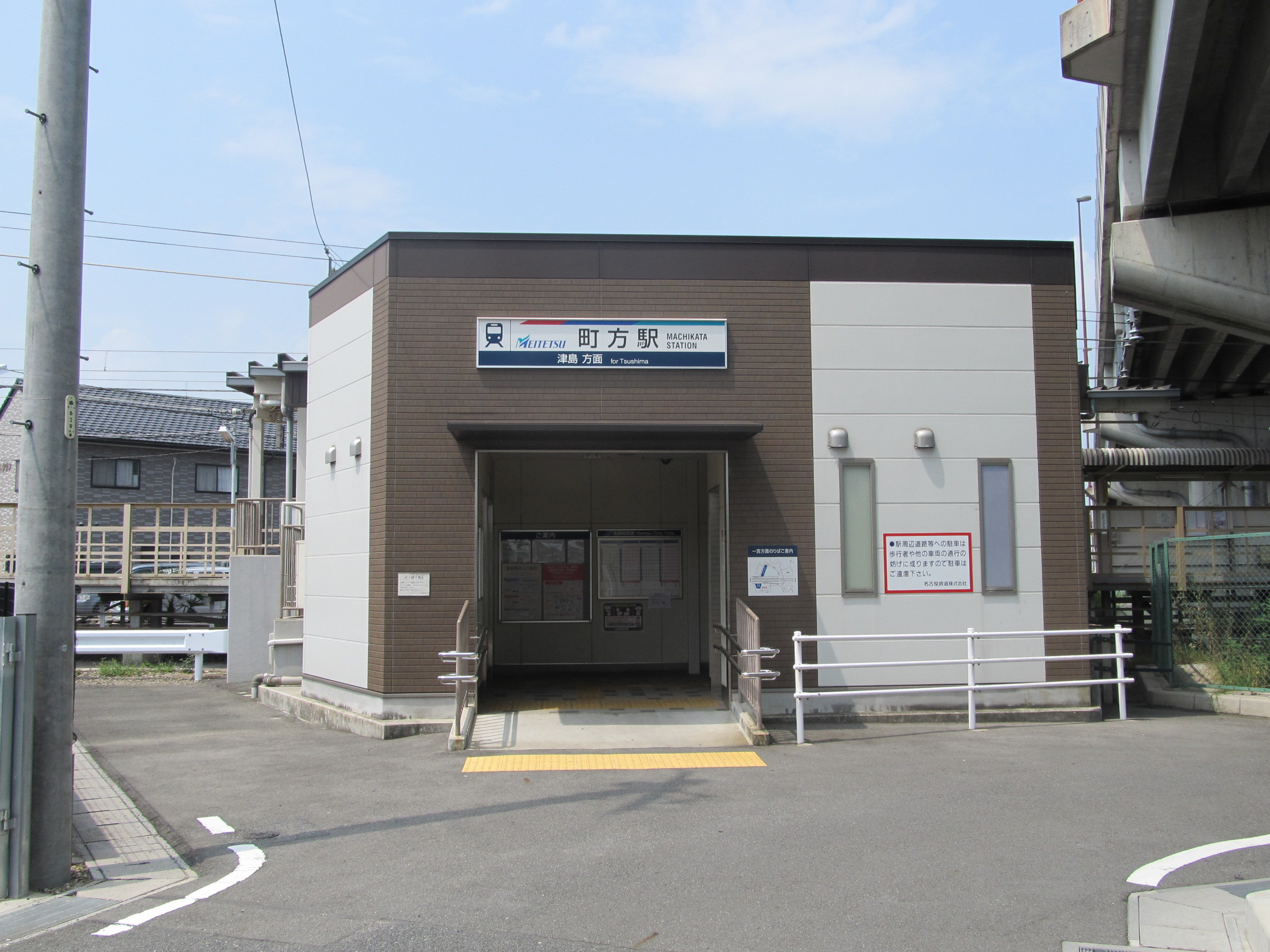
- Machikata Station In July 2013

General information
- Location: Minamiteigai-1 Machikata-cho, Aisai-shi, Aichi-ken 496-8014; Japan
- Coordinates: 35.1891°N 136.7276°E
- Operator: Meitetsu
- Line: ■ Bisai Line
- Distance: 9.6 kilometers from Yatomi
- Platforms: 2 side platforms

Other information
- Status: Unstaffed
- Station code: BS01
- Website: Official website

History
- Opened: October 1, 1924
- Former names: Kanehira Station (to 1956)

Passengers
- FY2017: 1,338 daily
Location
- Location within Aichi Prefecture Location within Japan

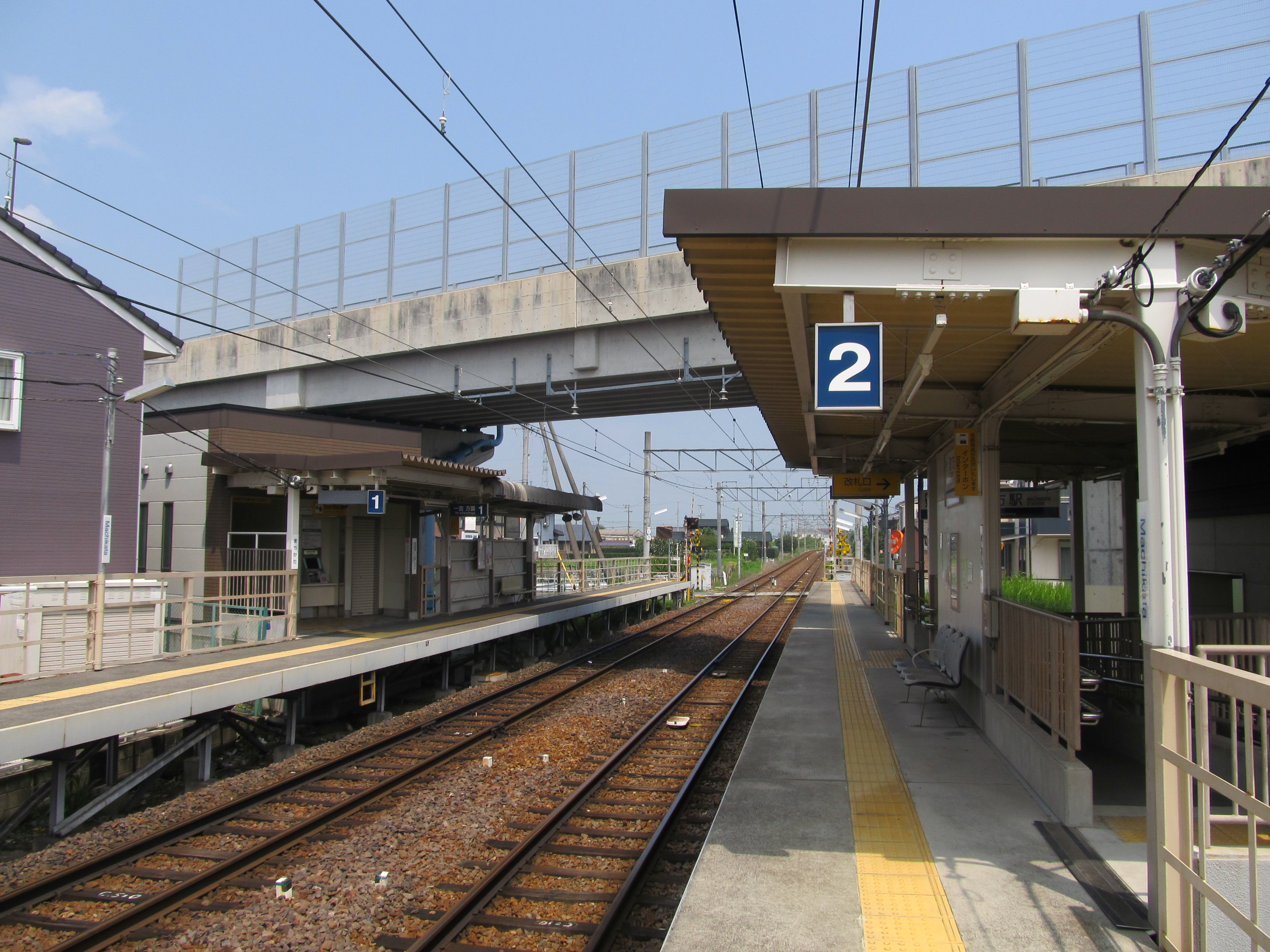
platforms

Machikata Station (町方駅, Machikata-eki) is a railway station in the city of Aisai, Aichi Prefecture, Japan, operated by Meitetsu.

== Lines ==
Machikata Station is served by the Meitetsu Bisai Line, and is located 9.6 kilometers from the starting point of the line at Yatomi.

== Station layout ==
The station has two opposed side platforms connected by an underground passage. The station has automated ticket machines, Manaca automated turnstiles and is unattended.

=== Platforms ===
1	■ Bisai Line	for Tsushima
2	■ Bisai Line	for Morikami and Meitetsu-Ichinomiya

== Adjacent stations ==
«	Service	»
Nagoya Railroad
Bisai Line
Tsushima	-	Rokuwa

== Station history ==
Machikata Station was opened on October 1, 1924 as Kanehira Station (兼平駅, Kanehira-eki) on the privately held Bisai Railroad, which was purchased by Meitetsu on August 1, 1925 becoming the Meitetsu Bisai Line. The station was closed in 1944, and reopened in 1956 under its present name. The platforms were reconstructed in 1974 and rearranged into their present configuration in 2004.

== Passenger statistics ==
In fiscal 2017, the station was used by an average of 1,338 passengers daily (boarding passengers only).

== Surrounding area ==
- Tsushima Kita High School

== See also ==
- List of railway stations in Japan
