= Fuchidaka Station =

Railway station in Aisai, Aichi Prefecture, Japan

Fuchidaka Station 渕高駅

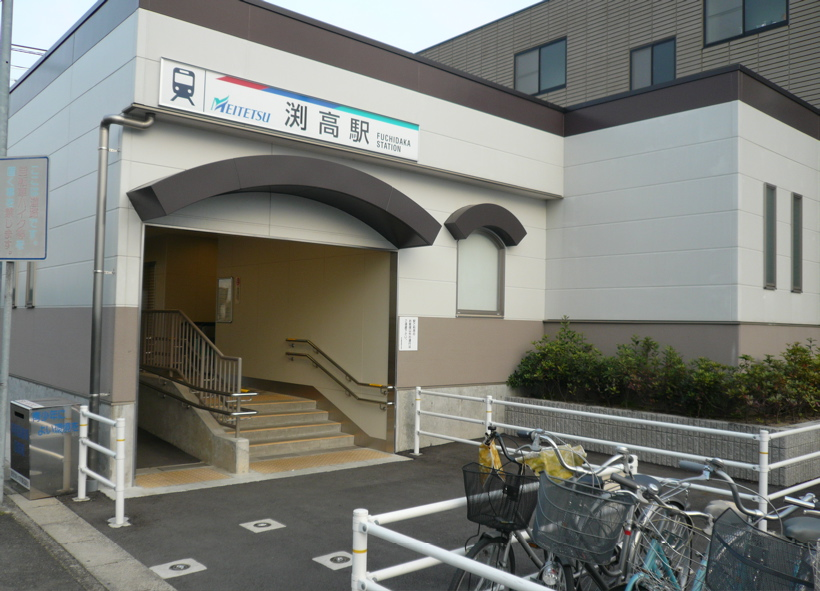
- Fuchidaka Station

General information
- Location: Yasewari Fuchidaka-cho, Aisai-shi, Aichi-ken 496-8018; Japan
- Coordinates: 35°12′49.5″N 136°43′38.7″E
- Operator: Meitetsu
- Line: ■ Bisai Line
- Distance: 12.4 kilometers from Yatomi
- Platforms: 2 side platforms

Other information
- Status: Unstaffed
- Station code: BS03
- Website: Official website

History
- Opened: October 1, 1924

Passengers
- FY2017: 1,688 daily
Location
- Location within Aichi Prefecture Location within Japan

Fuchidaka Station (渕高駅, Fuchidaka-eki) is a railway station in the city of Aisai, Aichi Prefecture, Japan, operated by Meitetsu.

== Lines ==
Fuchidaka Station is served by the Meitetsu Bisai Line, and is located 12.4 kilometers from the starting point of the line at Yatomi.

== Station layout ==
The station has two opposed side platforms connected by an underground passage. The station has automated ticket machines, Manaca automated turnstiles and is unattended.

=== Platforms ===
1	■ Bisai Line	for Morikami and Meitetsu-Ichinomiya
2	■ Bisai Line	for Tsushima

== Adjacent stations ==
«	Service	»
Nagoya Railroad
Bisai Line
Rokuwa	-	Marubuchi

== Station history ==
Fuchidaka Station was opened on October 1, 1924 as a station on the privately held Bisai Railroad, which was purchased by Meitetsu on August 1, 1925 becoming the Meitetsu Bisai Line. The station has been unattended since 1958.

== Passenger statistics ==
In fiscal 2017, the station was used by an average of 1,688 passengers daily (boarding passengers only).

== Surrounding area ==
- Saori Technical School
- Saori Special Education School

== See also ==
- List of railway stations in Japan
