= Kariyasuka Station =

Railway station in Ichinomiya, Aichi Prefecture, Japan

Kariyasuka Station 苅安賀駅

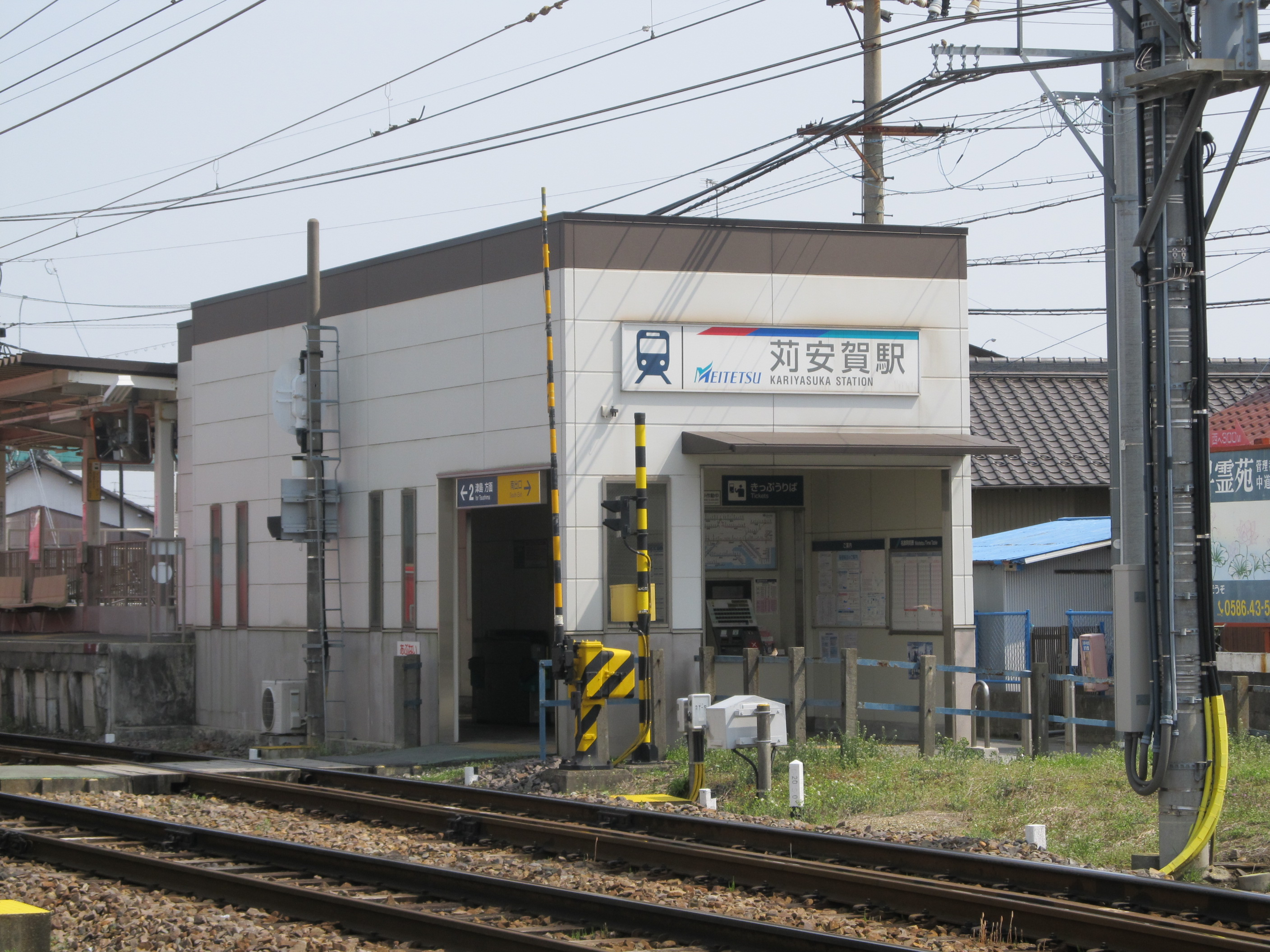
- Kariyasuka Station in March 2015

General information
- Location: Kaminishinoiri-130 Yamatochō Kariyasuka, Ichinomiya-shi, Aichi-ken 491-0934; Japan
- Coordinates: 35°17′13.77″N 136°46′41.65″E
- Operator: Meitetsu
- Line: ■ Bisai Line
- Distance: 22.5 kilometers from Yatomi
- Platforms: 2 side platforms

Other information
- Status: Unstaffed
- Station code: BS11
- Website: Official website

History
- Opened: January 24, 1900

Passengers
- FY2013: 945 daily
Location
- Location within Aichi Prefecture Location within Japan

Kariyasuka Station (苅安賀駅, Kariyasuka-eki) is a railway station in the city of Ichinomiya, Aichi Prefecture, Japan, operated by Meitetsu.

== Lines ==
Kariyasuka Station is served by the Meitetsu Bisai Line, and is located 22.5 kilometers from the starting point of the line at Yatomi.

== Station layout ==
The station has two opposed side platforms, connected by a level crossing, with track two on a passing loop. The station has automated ticket machines, Manaca automated turnstiles and is unattended.

=== Platforms ===
1	■ Bisai Line	For Meitetsu-Ichinomiya
2	■ Bisai Line	For Tsushima

== Adjacent stations ==
«	Service	»
Nagoya Railroad
Bisai Line
Futago	-	Kannonji

== Station history ==
Kariyasuka Station was opened on January 24, 1900 as a station on the privately held Bisai Railroad, which was purchased by Meitetsu on August 1, 1925 becoming the Meitetsu Bisai Line.

== Passenger statistics ==
In fiscal 2013, the station was used by an average of 945 passengers daily.

== Surrounding area ==
- Yamato Nishi Elementary School
- site of Kariyasuka Castle

== See also ==
- List of railway stations in Japan
