= Hagiwara Station (Aichi) =

Railway station in Ichinomiya, Aichi Prefecture, Japan

Hagiwara Station 萩原駅

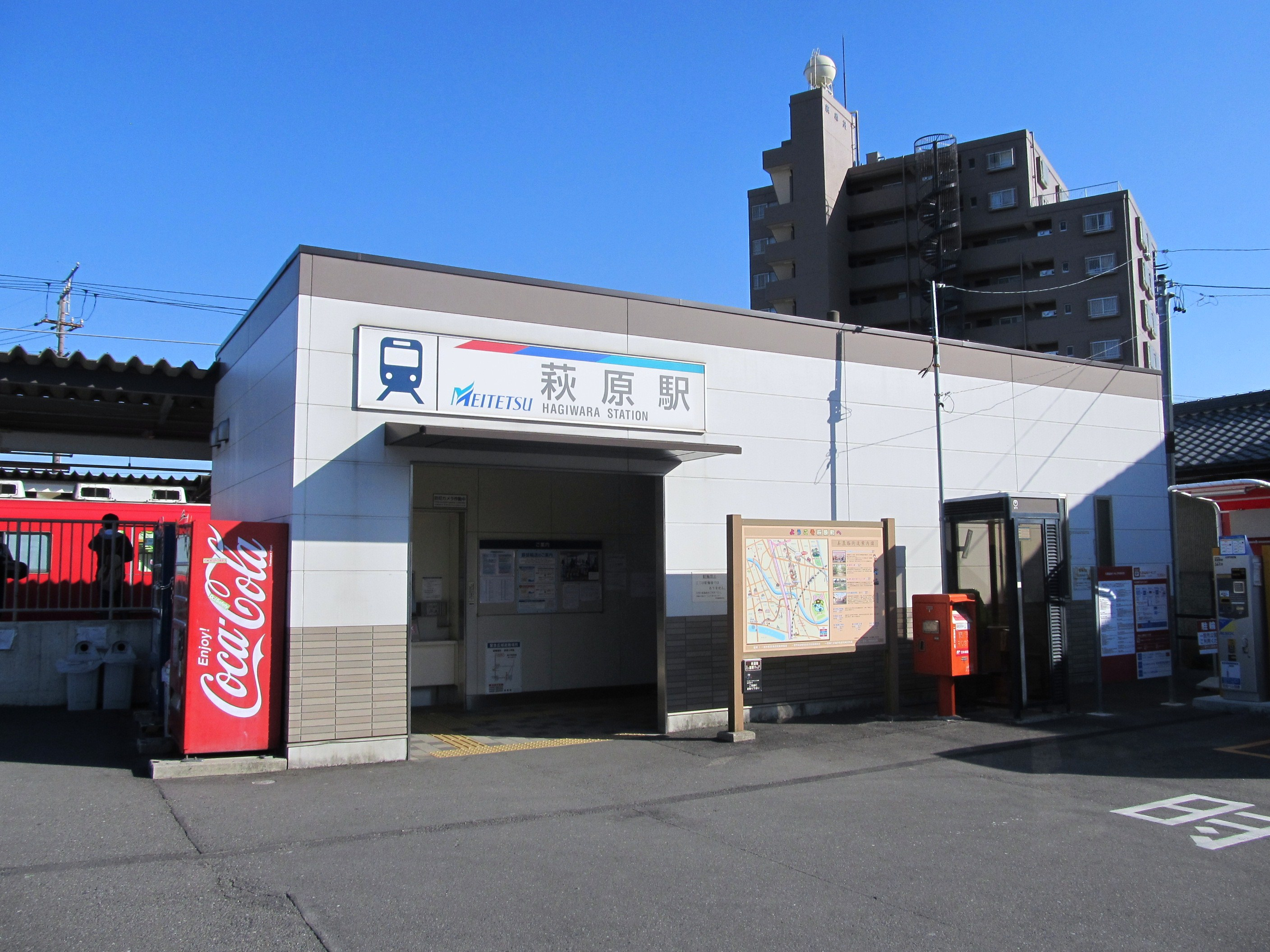
- Hagiwara Station in March 2015

General information
- Location: Kōjindamen-1414 Hagiwarachō Kushitsukuri, Ichinomiya-shi, Aichi-ken 491-0376; Japan
- Coordinates: 35.2769°N 136.758°E
- Operator: Meitetsu
- Line: ■ Bisai Line
- Distance: 20.2 kilometers from Yatomi
- Platforms: 2 side platforms

Other information
- Status: Unstaffed
- Station code: BS09
- Website: Official website

History
- Opened: October 1, 1899

Passengers
- FY2013: 2566 daily
Location
- Location within Aichi Prefecture Location within Japan

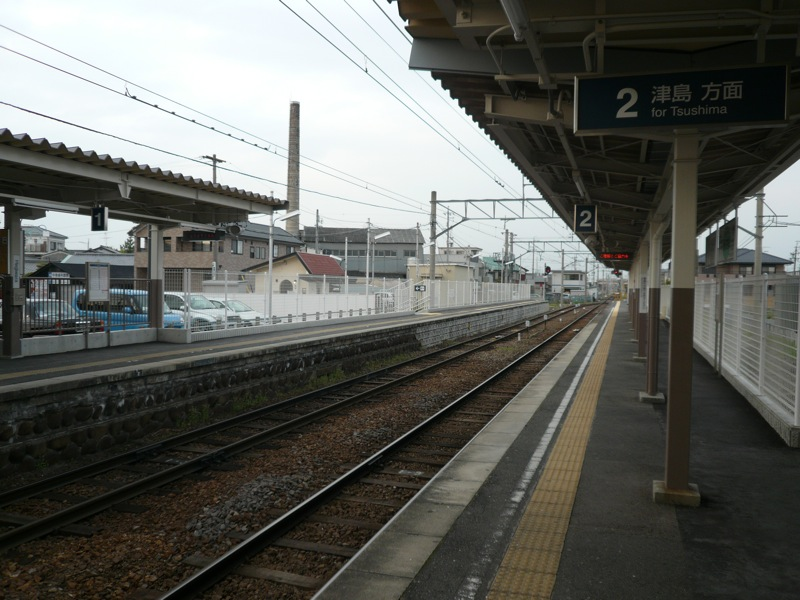
Platforms

Hagiwara Station (萩原駅, Hagiwara-eki) is a railway station in the city of Ichinomiya, Aichi Prefecture, Japan, operated by Meitetsu.

== Lines ==
Hagiwara Station is served by the Meitetsu Bisai Line, and is located 20.2 kilometers from the starting point of the line at Yatomi.

== Station layout ==
The station has two opposed side platforms, connected by a level crossing, with track one on a passing loop. The station has automated ticket machines, Manaca automated turnstiles and is unattended.

=== Platforms ===
1	■ Bisai Line	For Meitetsu-Ichinomiya
2	■ Bisai Line	For Tsushima

== Adjacent stations ==
«	Service	»
Nagoya Railroad
Bisai Line
Tamano	-	Futago

== Station history ==
Hagiwara Station was opened on October 1, 1899 as a station on the privately held Bisai Railroad, which was purchased by Meitetsu on August 1, 1925 becoming the Meitetsu Bisai Line. It was remodeled in 1955, and in 2007 it was outfitted with gates compatible with Tranpass fare cards and made unstaffed.

== Passenger statistics ==
In fiscal 2013, the station was used by an average of 2566 passengers daily.

== Surrounding area ==
- Hagiwara Elementary School
- Japan National Route 155

== See also ==
- List of railway stations in Japan
