= Nishi-Ichinomiya Station =

Railway station in Ichinomiya, Aichi Prefecture, Japan

Nishi-Ichinomiya Station 西一宮駅

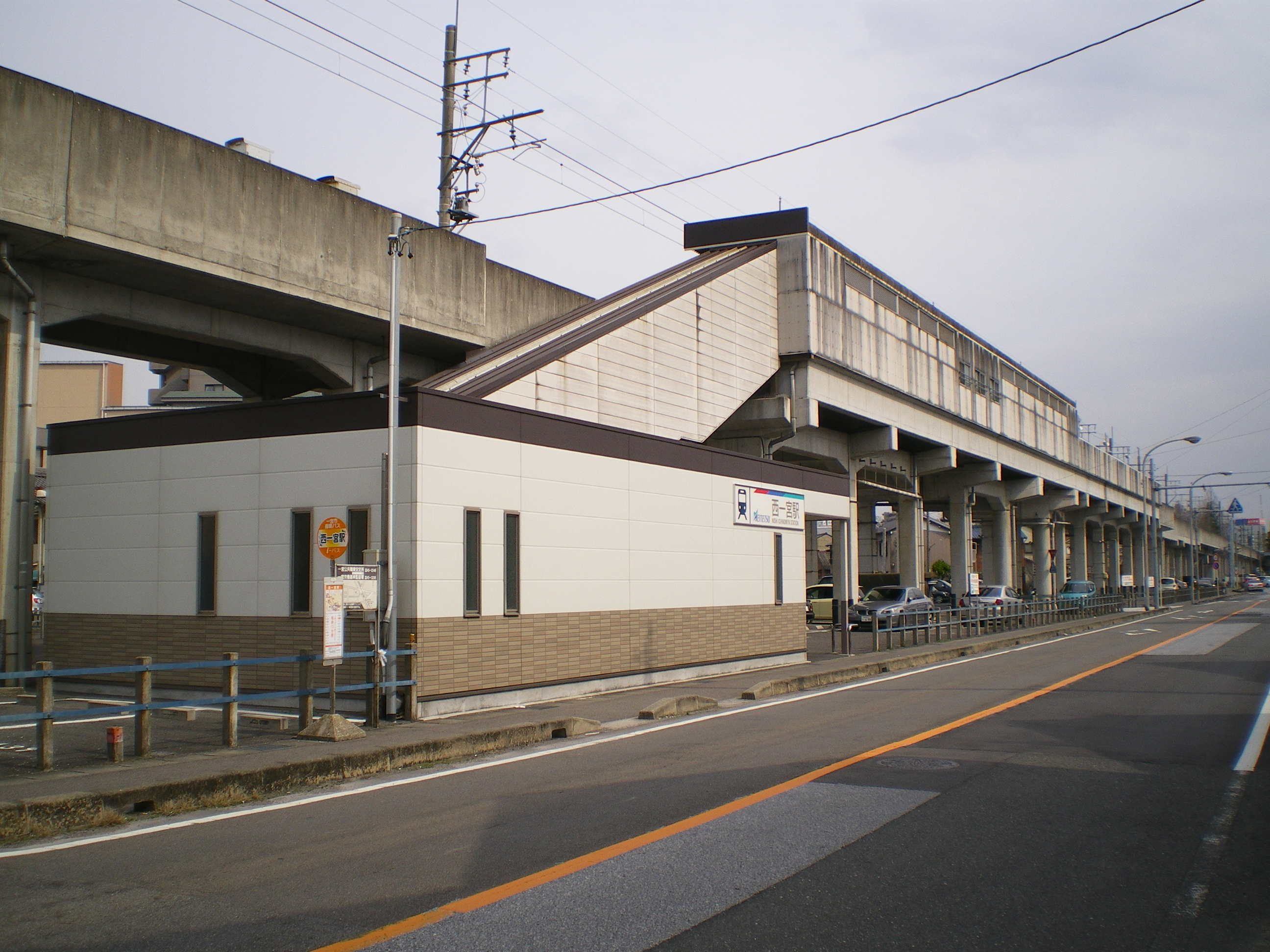
- Nishi-Ichinomiya Station in March 2010

General information
- Location: 1-3-1Tennō, Ichinomiya-shi, Aichi-ken 491-0046; Japan
- Coordinates: 35.3078°N 136.7917°E
- Operator: Meitetsu
- Line: ■ Bisai Line
- Distance: 26.0 kilometers from Yatomi
- Platforms: 1 side platform

Other information
- Status: Unstaffed
- Station code: BS21
- Website: Official website

History
- Opened: August 4, 1914

Passengers
- FY2013: 348 daily
Location
- Location within Aichi Prefecture Location within Japan

Nishi-Ichinomiya Station (西一宮駅, Nishi-Ichinomiya-eki) is a railway station in the city of Ichinomiya, Aichi Prefecture, Japan, operated by Meitetsu.

== Lines ==
Nishi-Ichinomiya Station is served by the Meitetsu Bisai Line, and is located 26.0 kilometers from the starting point of the line at Yatomi.

== Station layout ==
The station has one elevated side platform, serving a single bi-directional track with the station building underneath. The station has automated ticket machines, Manaca automated turnstiles, and is unattended.

== Adjacent stations ==
«	Service	»
Nagoya Railroad
Bisai Line
Meitetsu Ichinomiya	-	Kaimei

== Station history ==
Nishi-Ichinomiya Station was opened on August 4, 1914. The tracks were elevated in 1994.

== Passenger statistics ==
In fiscal 2013, the station was used by an average of 348 passengers daily.

== Surrounding area ==
- Japan National Route 155

== See also ==
- List of railway stations in Japan
