= Tamano Station =

Railway station in Ichinomiya, Aichi Prefecture, Japan

Tamano Station 玉野駅

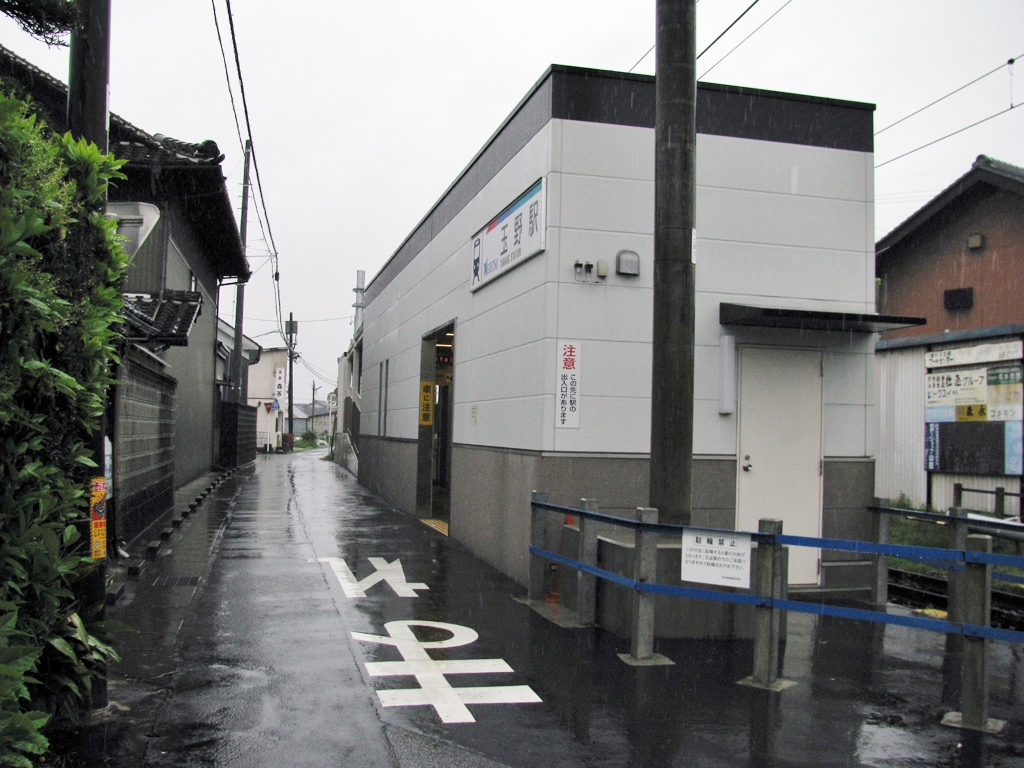
- Tamano Station in April 2009

General information
- Location: 19 Kawabata Tamano Ichinomiya-shi, Aichi-ken 494-0013; Japan
- Coordinates: 35.2663°N 136.7480°E
- Operator: Meitetsu
- Line: ■ Bisai Line
- Distance: 18.7 kilometers from Yatomi
- Platforms: 1 side platform

Other information
- Status: Unstaffed
- Station code: BS08
- Website: Official website

History
- Opened: October 1, 1924

Passengers
- FY2013: 979 daily
Location
- Location within Aichi Prefecture Location within Japan

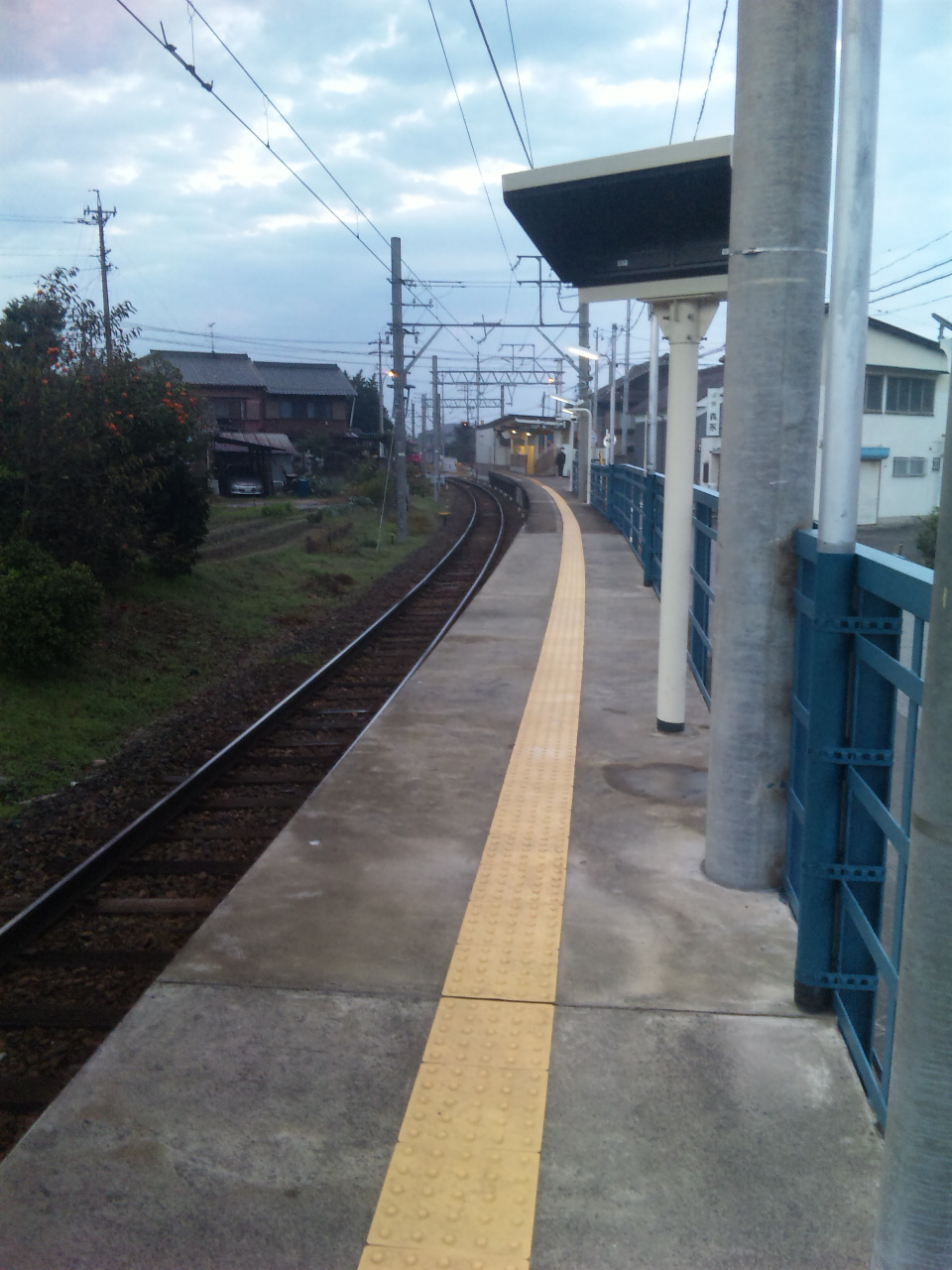
Platform

Tamano Station (玉野駅, Tamano-eki) is a railway station in the city of Ichinomiya, Aichi Prefecture, Japan, operated by Meitetsu.

== Lines ==
Tamano Station is served by the Meitetsu Bisai Line, and is located 18.7 kilometers from the starting point of the line at Yatomi.

== Station layout ==
The station has one side platform, serving a single bi-directional track. The platform is on a slight curve and can accommodate trains of up to four carriages in length. The station has automated ticket machines, Manaca automated turnstiles and is unattended.

== Adjacent stations ==
«	Service	»
Nagoya Railroad
Bisai Line
Yamazaki	-	Hagiwara

== Station history ==
Tamano Station was opened on October 1, 1924 as a station on the privately held Bisai Railroad, which was purchased by Meitetsu on August 1, 1925 becoming the Meitetsu Bisai Line.

== Passenger statistics ==
In fiscal 2013, the station was used by an average of 979 passengers daily.

== Surrounding area ==
- Bisai High School

== See also ==
- List of railway stations in Japan
