= Futago Station =

Railway station in Ichinomiya, Aichi Prefecture, Japan

Futago Station 二子駅

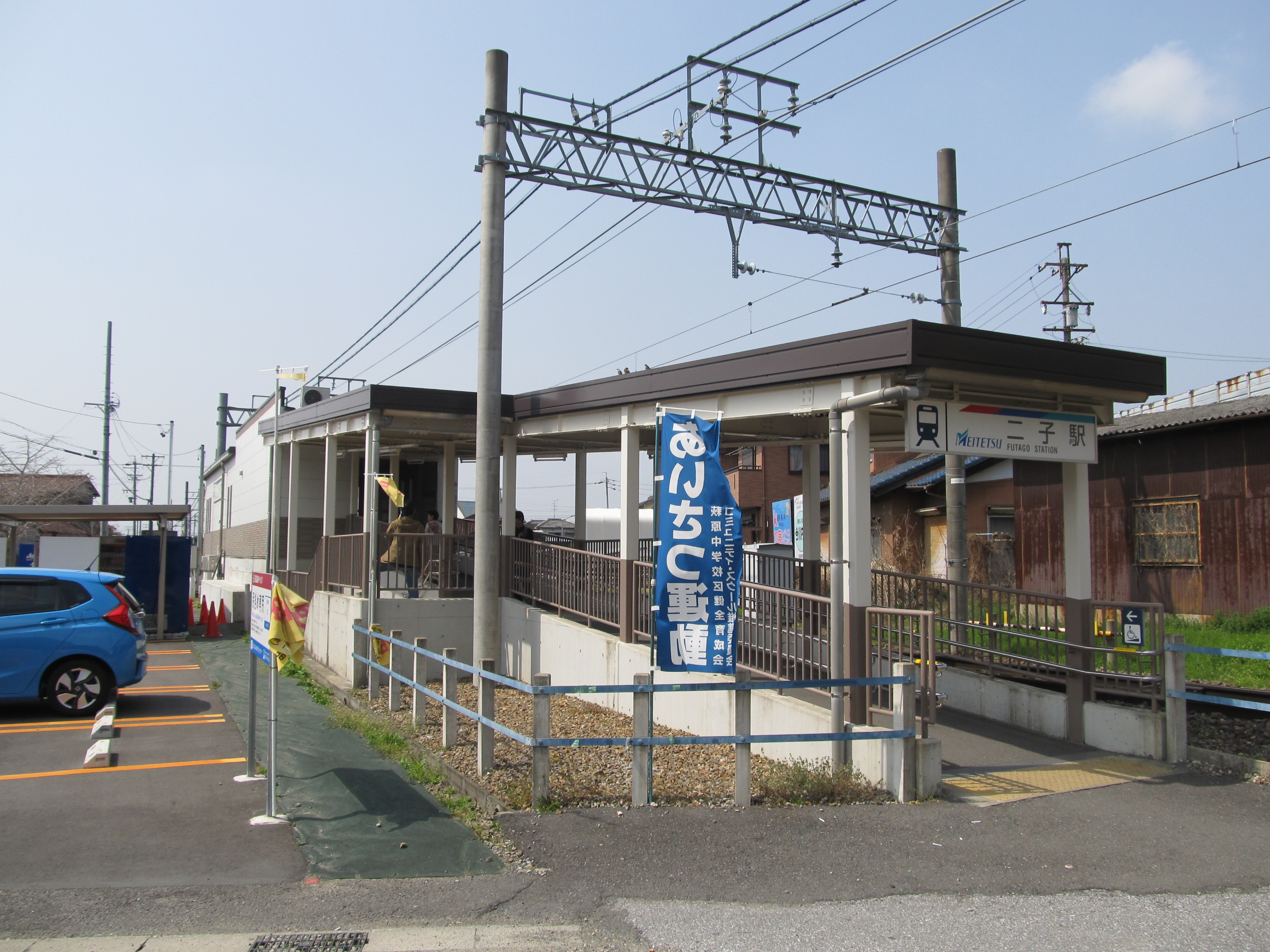
- Futago Station in March 2015

General information
- Location: Dainichi Hagiwara-cho Hagiwara, Ichinomiya-shi, Aichi-ken 491-0353; Japan
- Coordinates: 35°17′02.3″N 136°45′58.62″E
- Operator: Meitetsu
- Line: ■ Bisai Line
- Distance: 21.3 kilometers from Yatomi
- Platforms: 1 side platform

Other information
- Status: Unstaffed
- Station code: BS10
- Website: Official website

History
- Opened: October 1, 1924

Passengers
- FY2013: 2637 daily
Location
- Location within Aichi Prefecture Location within Japan

Futago Station (二子駅, Futago-eki) is a railway station in the city of Ichinomiya, Aichi Prefecture, Japan, operated by Meitetsu.

== Lines ==
Futago Station is served by the Meitetsu Bisai Line, and is located 21.3 kilometers from the starting point of the line at Yatomi.

== Station layout ==
The station has one side platform, serving a single bi-directional track. The station has automated ticket machines, Manaca automated turnstiles and is unattended.

== Adjacent stations ==
«	Service	»
Nagoya Railroad
Bisai Line
Hagiwara	-	Kariyasuka

== Station history ==
Futago Station was opened on October 1, 1924 as a station on the privately held Bisai Railroad, which was purchased by Meitetsu on August 1, 1925 becoming the Meitetsu Bisai Line. The station was closed in 1944 and reopened on October 15, 1949.

== Passenger statistics ==
In fiscal 2013, the station was used by an average of 2637 passengers daily.

== Surrounding area ==
- Aichi Cardiovascular and Respiratory Center
- Ichinomiya Nishi High School

== See also ==
- List of railway stations in Japan
