= Kaimei Station =

Railway station in Ichinomiya, Aichi Prefecture, Japan

Kaimei Station 開明駅

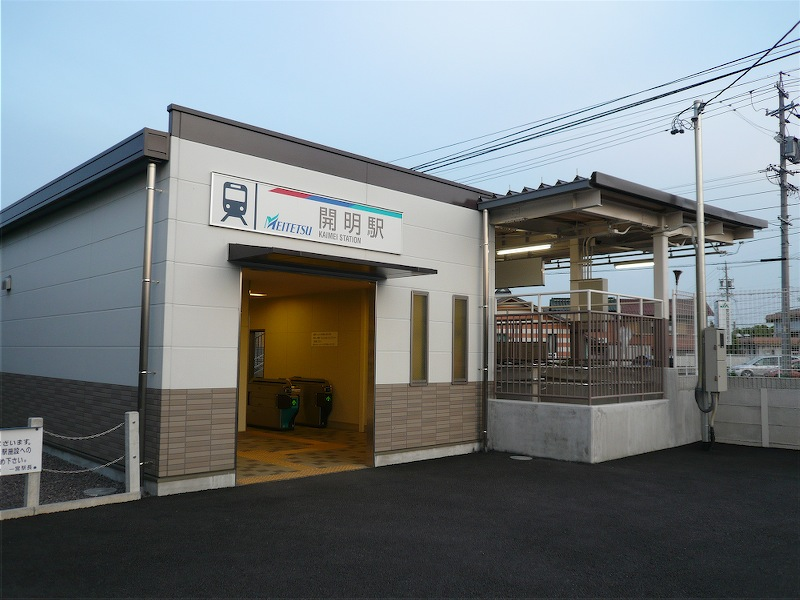
- Kaimei Station in June 2008

General information
- Location: Nagora Kaimei Ichinomiya-shi, Aichi-ken 494-0001; Japan
- Coordinates: 35.3193°N 136.7740°E
- Operator: Meitetsu
- Line: ■ Bisai Line
- Distance: 28.1 kilometers from Yatomi
- Platforms: 1 side platform

Other information
- Status: Unstaffed
- Station code: BS22
- Website: Official website

History
- Opened: August 4, 1914

Passengers
- FY2013: 1540 daily
Location
- Location within Aichi Prefecture Location within Japan

Kaimei Station (開明駅, Kaimei-eki) is a railway station in the city of Ichinomiya, Aichi Prefecture, Japan, operated by Meitetsu.

== Lines ==
Kaimei Station is served by the Meitetsu Bisai Line, and is located 28.1 kilometers from the starting point of the line at Yatomi.

== Station layout ==
The station has one side platform, serving a single bi-directional track. The station has automated ticket machines, Manaca automated turnstiles and is unattended.

== Adjacent stations ==
| « | Service | » |
Nagoya Railroad
Bisai Line
| Nishi-Ichinomiya | - | Okuchō |

== Station history ==
Kaimei Station was opened on August 4, 1914.

== Passenger statistics ==
In fiscal 2013, the station was used by an average of 1540 passengers daily.

== Surrounding area ==
- former Bisai City Hall

== See also ==
- List of railway stations in Japan
