= Gonosan Station =

Railway station in Yatomi, Aichi Prefecture, Japan

Gonosan Station 五ノ三駅

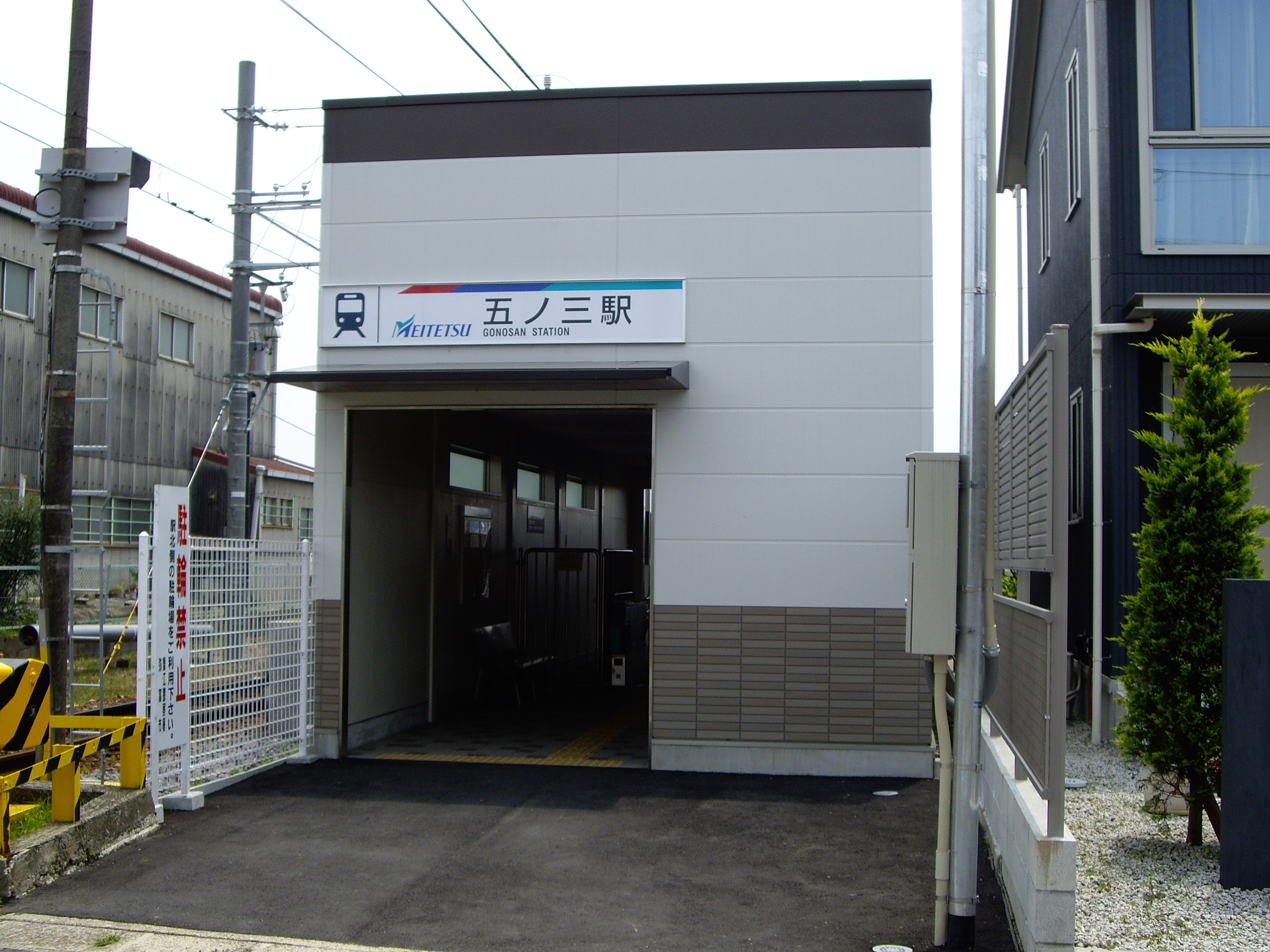
- Gonosan Station in July 2008

General information
- Location: Honden Gonosancho, Yatomi-shi, Aichi-ken 498-0012; Japan
- Coordinates: 35.1300°N 136.7115°E
- Operator: Meitetsu
- Line: ■ Bisai Line
- Distance: 2.5 kilometers from Yatomi
- Platforms: 1 side platform

Other information
- Status: Staffed
- Station code: TB10
- Website: Official website

History
- Opened: October 1, 1924

Passengers
- 2006: 69,204
Location
- Location within Aichi Prefecture Location within Japan

Gonosan Station (五ノ三駅, Gonosan-eki) is a railway station in the city of Yatomi, Aichi Prefecture, Japan, operated by Meitetsu.

== Lines ==
Gonosan Station is served by the Meitetsu Bisai Line, and is located 2.5 kilometers from the starting point of the line at Yatomi.

== Station layout ==
The station has one side platform, serving a single bi-directional track. The platform is short, and can handle trains of four carriages in length. The station has automated ticket machines, Manaca automated turnstiles and is unattended.

== Adjacent stations ==
«	Service	»
Meitetsu
Bisai Line
Yatomi	-	Saya

== Station history ==
Gonosan Station was opened on October 1, 1924 as a station on the Bisai Railway, which was acquired by Meitetsu on August 1, 1925. A new station building was completed in March 2006.

== Surrounding area ==
- Japan National Route 155

== See also ==
- List of railway stations in Japan
