= Yamazaki Station (Aichi) =

Railway station in Inazawa, Aichi Prefecture, Japan

Yamazaki Station 山崎駅

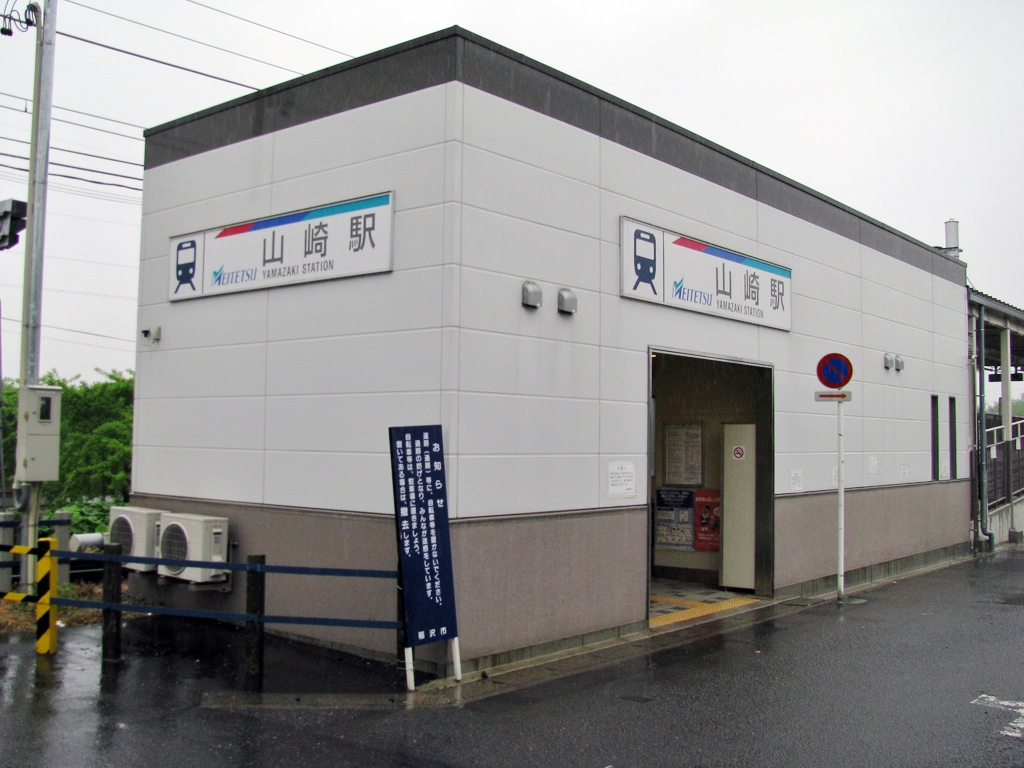
- Yamazaki Station in April 2009

General information
- Location: Nakayashiki 105-1 Sobuecho, Yamazaki, Inazawa-shi, Aichi-ken 495-0002; Japan
- Coordinates: 35.2564°N 136.739°E
- Operator: Meitetsu
- Line: ■ Bisai Line
- Distance: 17.3 kilometers from Yatomi
- Platforms: 1 side platform

Other information
- Status: Unstaffed
- Station code: BS07
- Website: Official website

History
- Opened: January 25, 1930

Passengers
- FY2017: 1,077 daily
Location
- Location within Aichi Prefecture Location within Japan

Yamazaki Station (山崎駅, Yamazaki-eki) is a railway station in the city of Inazawa, Aichi Prefecture, Japan, operated by Meitetsu.

== Lines ==
Yamazaki Station is served by the Meitetsu Bisai Line, and is located 17.3 kilometers from the starting point of the line at Yatomi.

== Station layout ==
The station has one side platform serving a single bi-directional track. The station has automated ticket machines, Manaca automated turnstiles and is unattended.

== Adjacent stations ==
«	Service	»
Meitetsu
Bisai Line
Morikami	-	Tamano

== Station history ==
Yamazaki Station was opened on January 25, 1930.

== Passenger statistics ==
In fiscal 2017, the station was used by an average of 1,077 passengers daily.

== Surrounding area ==
- Yamada Dobby Co Ltd
- Yamazaki Elementary School

== See also ==
- List of railway stations in Japan
