= Okuchō Station =

Railway station in Ichinomiya, Aichi Prefecture, Japan

Okuchō Station 奥町駅

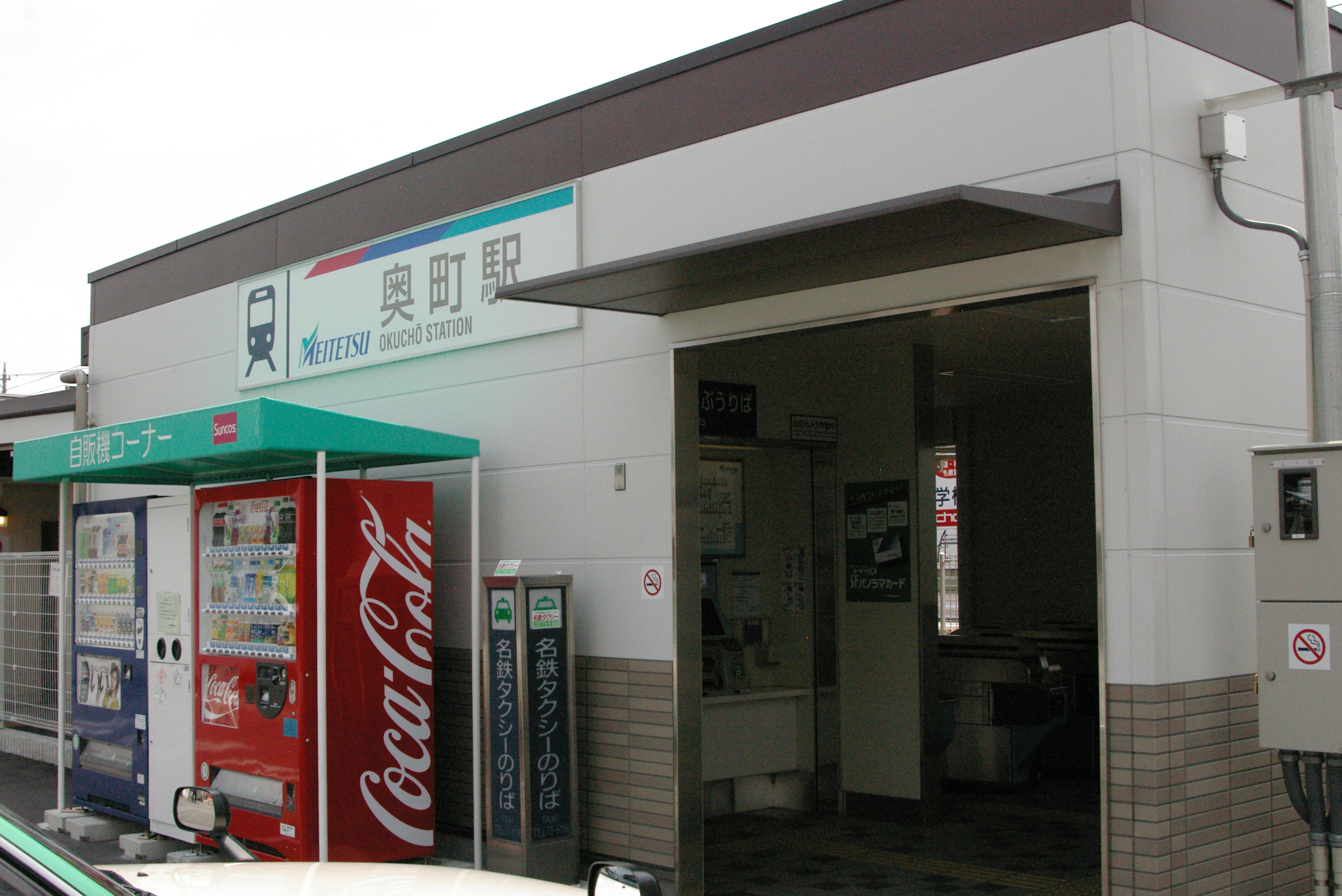
- Okuchō Station in July 2013

General information
- Location: Minamimegusa-30 Okuchō, Ichinomiya-shi, Aichi-ken 491-0201; Japan
- Coordinates: 35.3245°N 136.7611°E
- Operator: Meitetsu
- Line: ■ Bisai Line
- Distance: 29.4 kilometers from Yatomi
- Platforms: 1 side platform

Other information
- Status: Unstaffed
- Station code: BS23
- Website: Official website

History
- Opened: August 4, 1914

Passengers
- FY2013: 4394 daily
Location
- Location within Aichi Prefecture Location within Japan

Okuchō Station (奥町駅, Okuchō-eki) is a railway station in the city of Ichinomiya, Aichi Prefecture, Japan, operated by Meitetsu.

== Lines ==
Okuchō Station is served by the Meitetsu Bisai Line, and is located 29.4 kilometers from the starting point of the line at Yatomi.

== Station layout ==
The station has one side platform, serving a single bi-directional track. The station has automated ticket machines, Manaca automated turnstiles and is unattended.

== Adjacent stations ==
«	Service	»
Nagoya Railroad
Bisai Line
Kaimei	-	Tamanoi

== Station history ==
Okuchō Station was opened on August 4, 1914. The station was closed in 1944 and reopened on December 28, 1951.

== Passenger statistics ==
In fiscal 2013, the station was used by an average of 4394 passengers daily.

== Surrounding area ==
- Kisogawa High School
- Oku Junior High School
- Oku Elementary School
- site of Oku Castle

== See also ==
- List of railway stations in Japan
