= 観音寺駅 =

観音寺駅, meaning "station of Temple of Guanyin", may refer to stations:

- Kannonji Station, railway station in the city of Ichinomiya, Aichi Prefecture, Japan
- Kan'onji Station, railway station in the city of Kan'onji, Kagawa, Kagawa Prefecture, Japan
