= Kannonji Station =

Railway station in Ichinomiya, Aichi Prefecture, Japan

Kannonji Station 観音寺駅

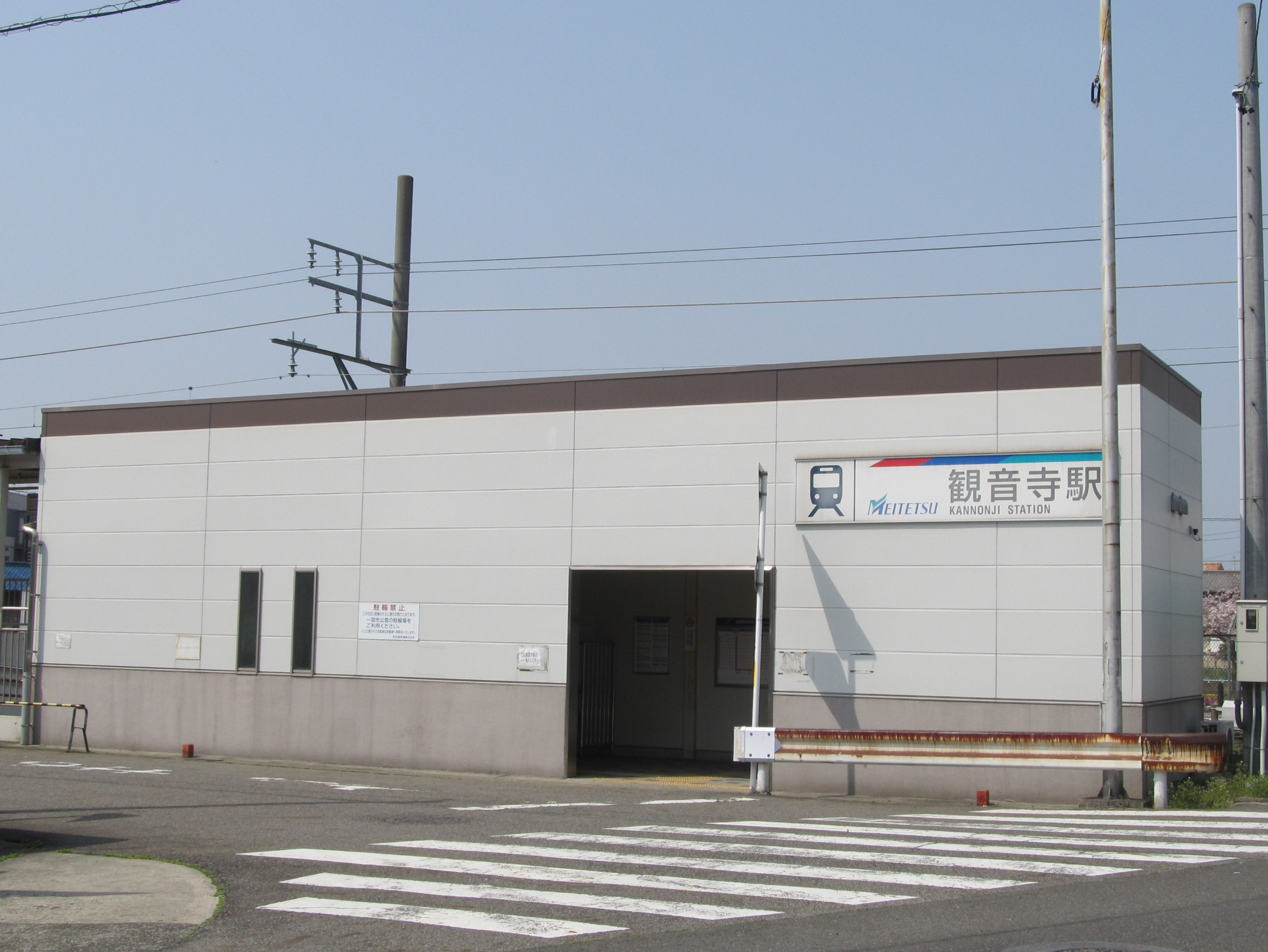
- Kannonji Station in August 2008

General information
- Location: 12-5-2 Kannonji, Ichinomiya-shi, Aichi-ken; Japan
- Coordinates: 35.2897°N 136.786°E
- Operator: Meitetsu
- Line: ■ Bisai Line
- Distance: 23.2 kilometers from Yatomi
- Platforms: 1 side platform

Other information
- Status: Unstaffed
- Station code: BS12
- Website: Official website

History
- Opened: August 15, 1928

Passengers
- FY2013: 1567 daily
Location
- Location within Aichi Prefecture Location within Japan

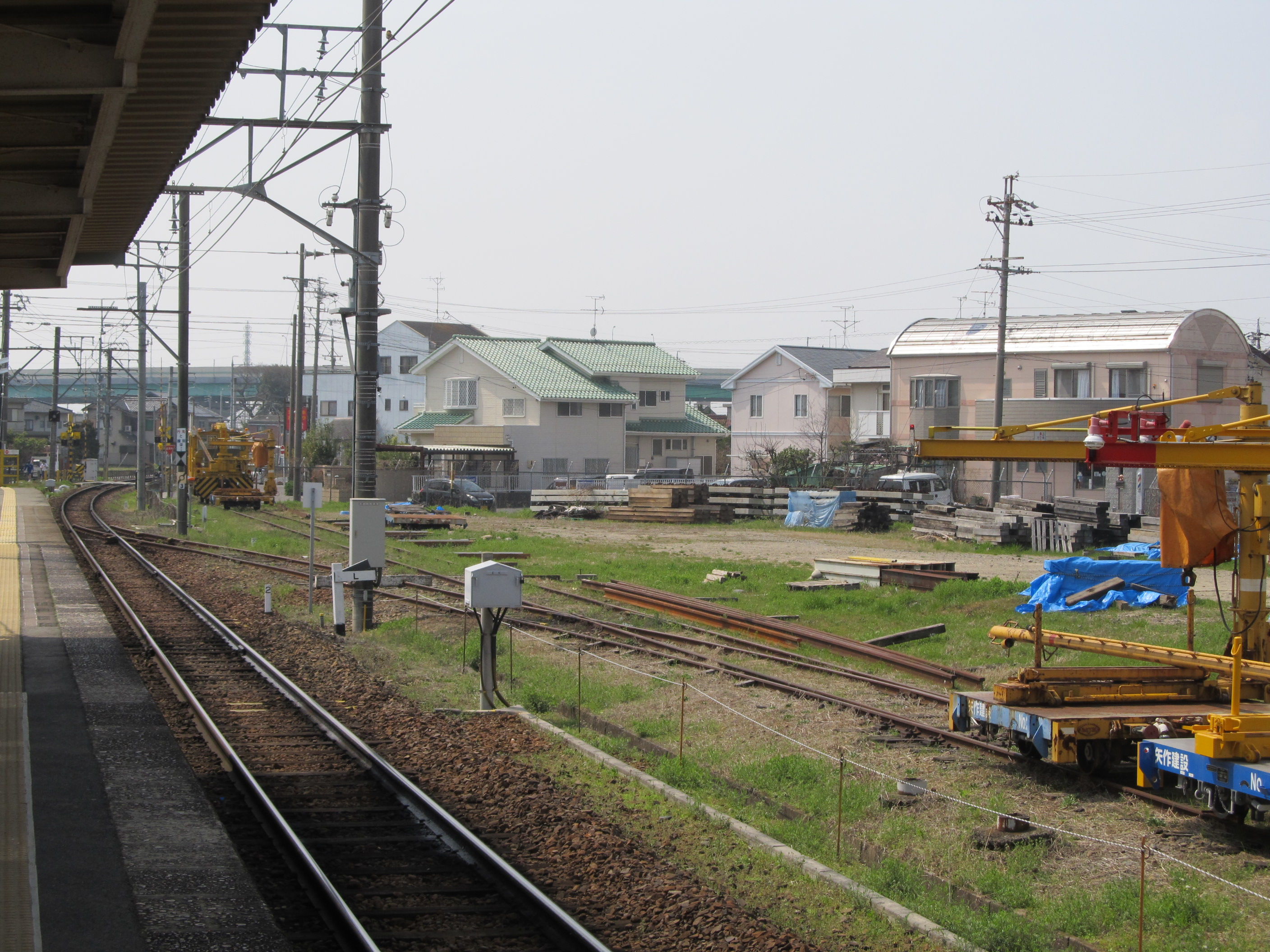
Side track

Kannonji Station (観音寺駅, Kannonji-eki) is a railway station in the city of Ichinomiya, Aichi Prefecture, Japan, operated by Meitetsu.

== Lines ==
Kannonji Station is served by the Meitetsu Bisai Line, and is located 23.2 kilometers from the starting point of the line at Yatomi.

== Station layout ==
The station has one side platform, serving a single bi-directional track. The station has automated ticket machines, Manaca automated turnstiles, and is unattended.

== Adjacent stations ==
«	Service	»
Nagoya Railroad
Bisai Line
Kariyasuka	-	Meitetsu Ichinomiya

== Station history ==
Kannonji Station was opened on August 15, 1928. The station was closed in 1944 and reopened on July 22, 1950.

== Passenger statistics ==
In fiscal 2013, the station was used by an average of 1567 passengers daily.

== Surrounding area ==
- former Yamato Town Hall
- Yamato Junior High School

== See also ==
- List of railway stations in Japan
