= Meitetsu Bisai Line =

Railway line in Aichi Prefecture, Japan

Bisai Line

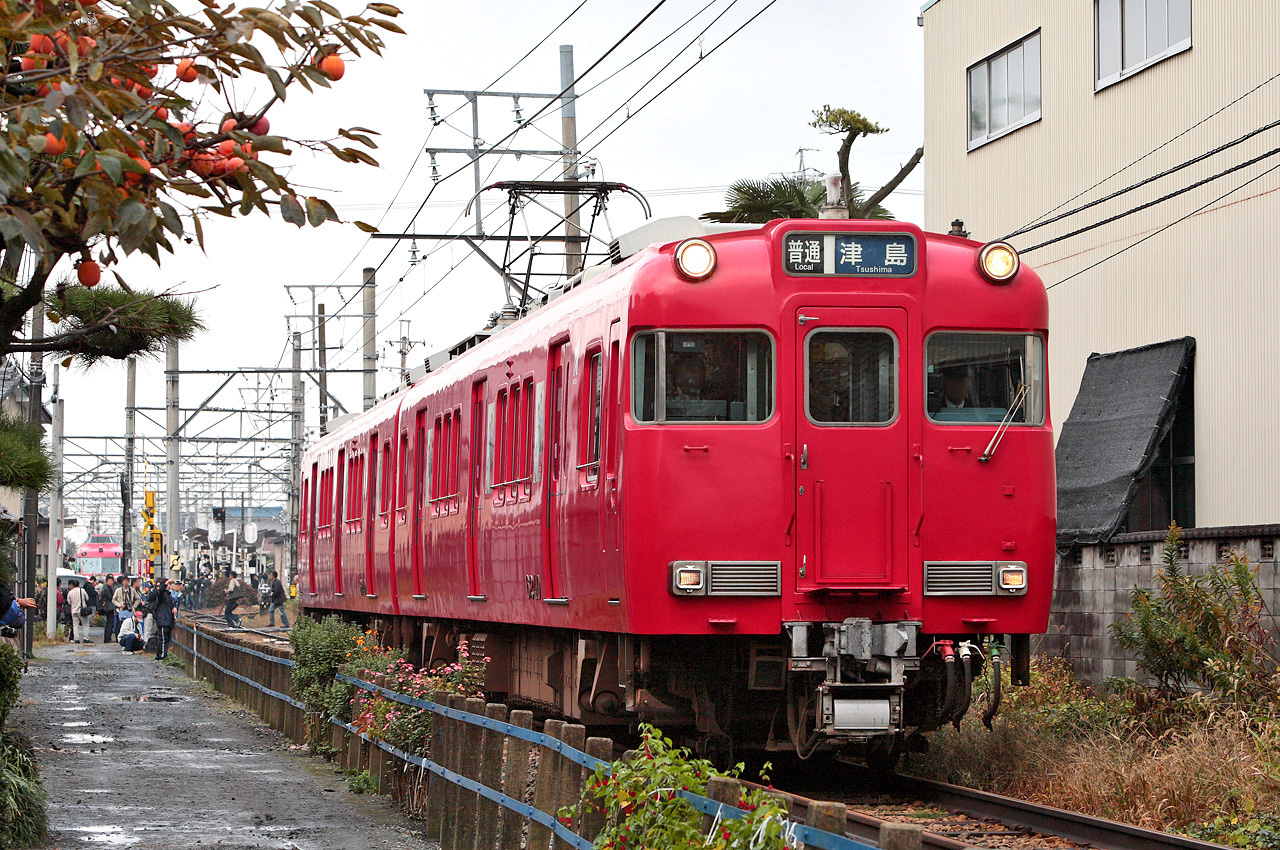
- A Meitetsu 6000 series EMU

Overview
- Native name: 尾西線
- Status: In service
- Owner: Nagoya Railroad Co., Ltd.
- Locale: Aichi Prefecture
- Termini: Yatomi; Tamanoi
- Stations: 22

Service
- Type: Commuter rail
- System: Meitetsu
- Route number: TB (Yatomi–Tsushima); BS (Machikata–Tamanoi)
- Operator(s): Nagoya Railroad Co., Ltd.
- Daily ridership: 11,897 (FY2008)

History
- Opened: 1898; 128 years ago

Technical
- Line length: 30.9 km (19.20 mi)
- Track gauge: 1,067 mm (3 ft 6 in)
- Electrification: 1,500 V DC, overhead catenary
- Operating speed: 100 km/h (62 mph)

The Bisai Line (尾西線, Bisai-sen) is a 30.9 km (19.2 mi) Japanese railway line which connects Yatomi Station in Yatomi, Aichi with Tamanoi Station in Ichinomiya, Aichi. It is owned and operated by the private railway operator Meitetsu (Nagoya Railroad).

== Stations ==
All stations are in Aichi Prefecture.

| No. | Station | Japanese | Distance (km) | Local | Semi Express | Express | Limited Express | Transfers | Location |
| | Yatomi | 弥富 | 0.0 | ● | | | | Kansai Main Line (CJ05); Nagoya Line (Kintetsu Yatomi: E11) | Yatomi |
| | Gonosan | 五ノ三 | 2.5 | ● | | | | | Yatomi |
| | Saya | 佐屋 | 4.6 | ● | ● | ● | ● | | Aisai |
| | Hibino | 日比野 | 6.6 | ● | ● | ● | ● | | Aisai |
| | Tsushima | 津島 | 8.2 | ● | ● | ● | ● | Tsushima Line (TB07) | Tsushima |
| | Machikata | 町方 | 9.6 | ● | | | | | Aisai |
| | Rokuwa | 六輪 | 11.1 | ● | | | | | Inazawa |
| | Fuchidaka | 渕高 | 12.4 | ● | | | | | Aisai |
| | Marubuchi | 丸渕 | 13.4 | ● | | | | | Inazawa |
| | Kami-Marubuchi | 上丸渕 | 14.7 | ● | | | | | Inazawa |
| | Morikami | 森上 | 16.2 | ● | | | | | Inazawa |
| | Yamazaki | 山崎 | 17.3 | ● | | | | | Inazawa |
| | Tamano | 玉野 | 18.7 | ● | | | | | Ichinomiya |
| | Hagiwara | 萩原 | 20.2 | ● | | | | | Ichinomiya |
| | Futago | 二子 | 21.3 | ● | | | | | Ichinomiya |
| | Kariyasuka | 苅安賀 | 22.5 | ● | | | | | Ichinomiya |
| | Kannonji | 観音寺 | 23.2 | ● | | | | | Ichinomiya |
| | Meitetsu Ichinomiya | 名鉄一宮 | 25.3 | ● | | | | Nagoya Main Line (NH50); Tōkaidō Main Line (Owari-Ichinomiya: CA72) | Ichinomiya |
| | Nishi-Ichinomiya | 西一宮 | 26.0 | ● | | | | | Ichinomiya |
| | Kaimei | 開明 | 28.1 | ● | | | | | Ichinomiya |
| | Okuchō | 奥町 | 29.4 | ● | | | | | Ichinomiya |
| | Tamanoi | 玉ノ井 | 30.9 | ● | | | | | Ichinomiya |

== History ==
The Yatomi to Tsushima section was opened in 1898 by the Bisai Railway, and was extended to Ichinomiya in 1900. In 1914, the line was extended to Tamanoi and Kisogawa-Bashi (since closed), and a freight-only line to Kiso-Minato opened in 1918.

The Kiso-Minato to Morikami section was electrified at 600 V DC in 1922, and extended to Yatomi the following year. The company merged with Meitetsu in 1925.

In 1948, the voltage on the Yatomi to Tsushima section was raised to 1,500 V DC, with this increase extended to the rest of the line in 1952. The Kiso-Minato to Tamanoi section closed in 1959. The Tsushima to Morikami section was double-tracked between 1967 and 1974.
