= Tamanoi Station =

Railway station in Ichinomiya, Aichi Prefecture, Japan

Tamanoi Station 玉ノ井駅

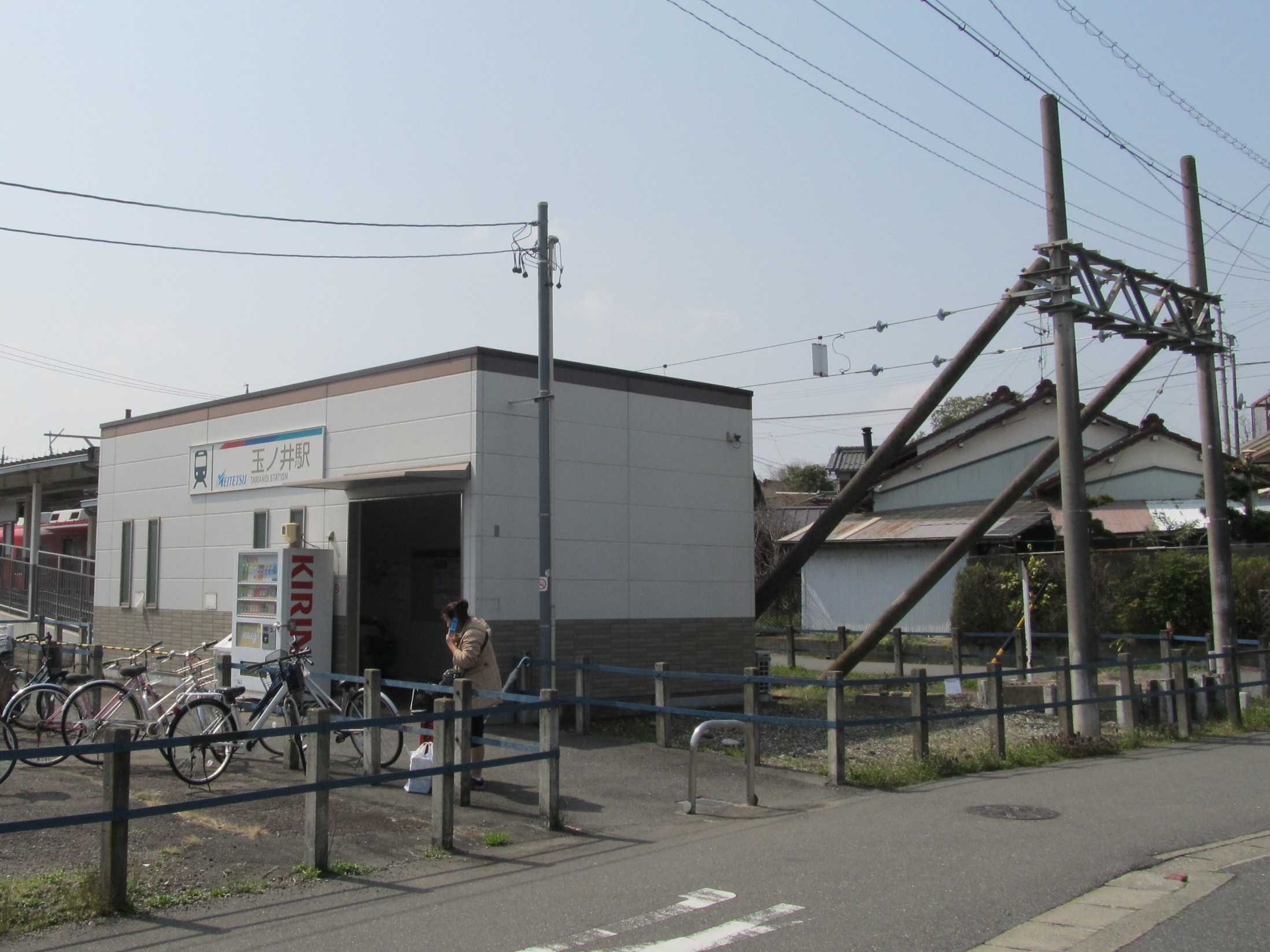
- Tamanoi Station in March 2015

General information
- Location: Goiden Kisogawa-cho Tamanoi, Ichinomiya-shi, Aichi-ken 493-0004; Japan
- Coordinates: 35.3356°N 136.7574°E
- Operator: Meitetsu
- Line: ■ Bisai Line
- Distance: 30.9 kilometers from Yatomi
- Platforms: 1 side platform

Other information
- Status: Unstaffed
- Station code: BS24
- Website: Official website

History
- Opened: August 4, 1914

Passengers
- FY2013: 1544 daily
Location
- Location within Aichi Prefecture Location within Japan

Tamanoi Station (玉ノ井駅, Tamanoi-eki) is a railway station in the city of Ichinomiya, Aichi Prefecture, Japan, operated by Meitetsu.

== Lines ==
Tamanoi Station is a terminal station of the Meitetsu Bisai Line, and is located 30.9 kilometers from the opposing terminal of the line at Yatomi.

== Station layout ==
The station has one side platform, serving a single bi-directional track. The station has automated ticket machines, Manaca automated turnstiles and is unattended.

== Adjacent stations ==
«	Service	»
Nagoya Railroad
Bisai Line
Okuchō	-	Terminus

== Station history ==
Tamanoi Station was opened on August 4, 1914. The station was closed in 1944 and reopened on December 28, 1951.

== Passenger statistics ==
In fiscal 2013, the station was used by an average of 1544 passengers daily.

== Surrounding area ==
- Kamo Jinja

== See also ==
- List of railway stations in Japan
