= Morikami Station =

Railway station in Inazawa, Aichi Prefecture, Japan

Morikami Station 森上駅

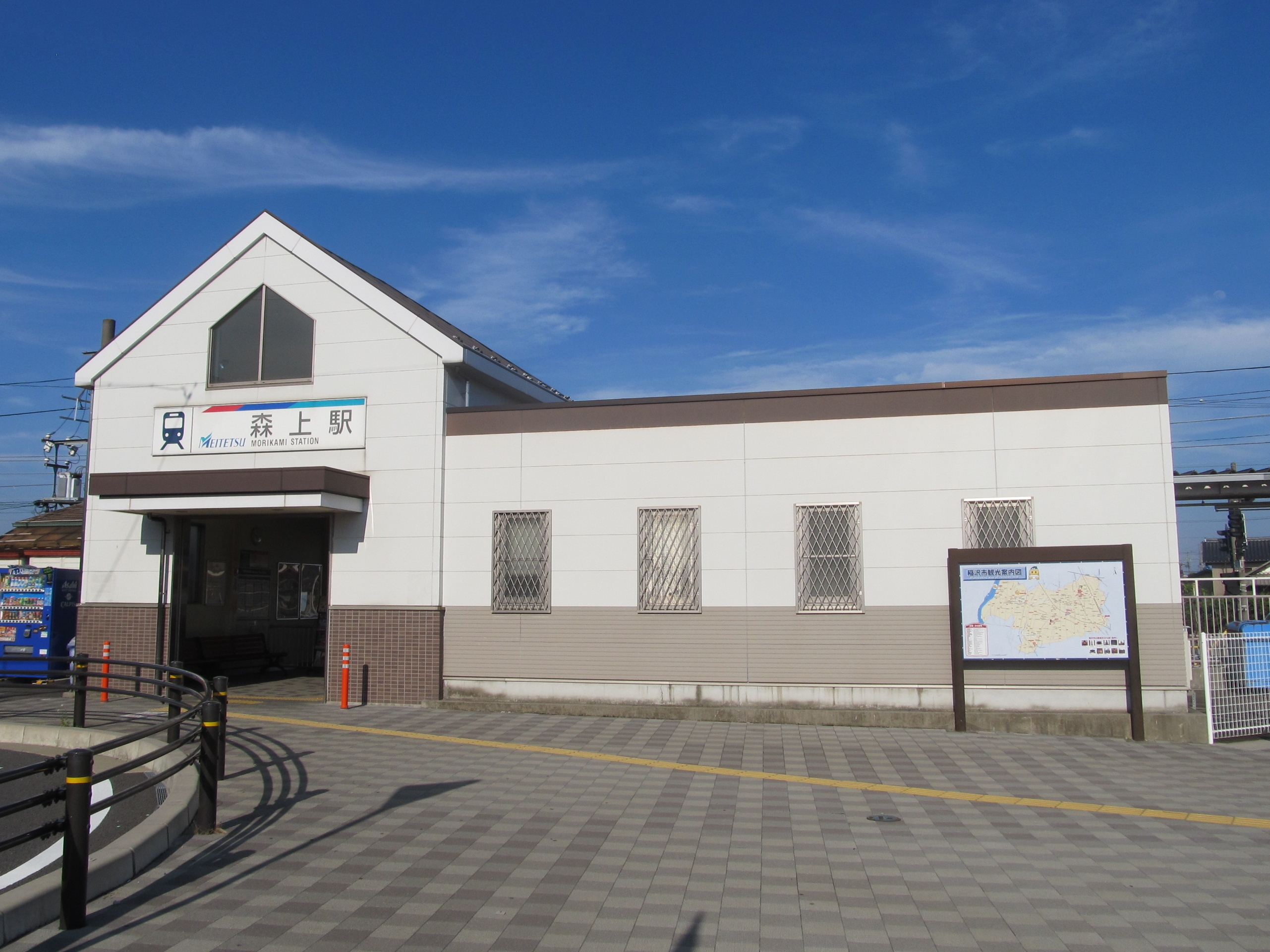
- Morikami Station in June 2018

General information
- Location: Hongō7-30 Sobuechō Morikami, Inazawa-shi, Aichi-ken 495-0011; Japan
- Coordinates: 35.2477°N 136.7368°E
- Operator: Meitetsu
- Line: ■ Bisai Line
- Distance: 16.2 kilometers from Yatomi
- Platforms: 1 island + 1 side platform

Other information
- Status: Staffed
- Station code: BS06
- Website: Official website

History
- Opened: February 17, 1899

Passengers
- FY2017: 3,194 daily
Location
- Location within Aichi Prefecture Location within Japan

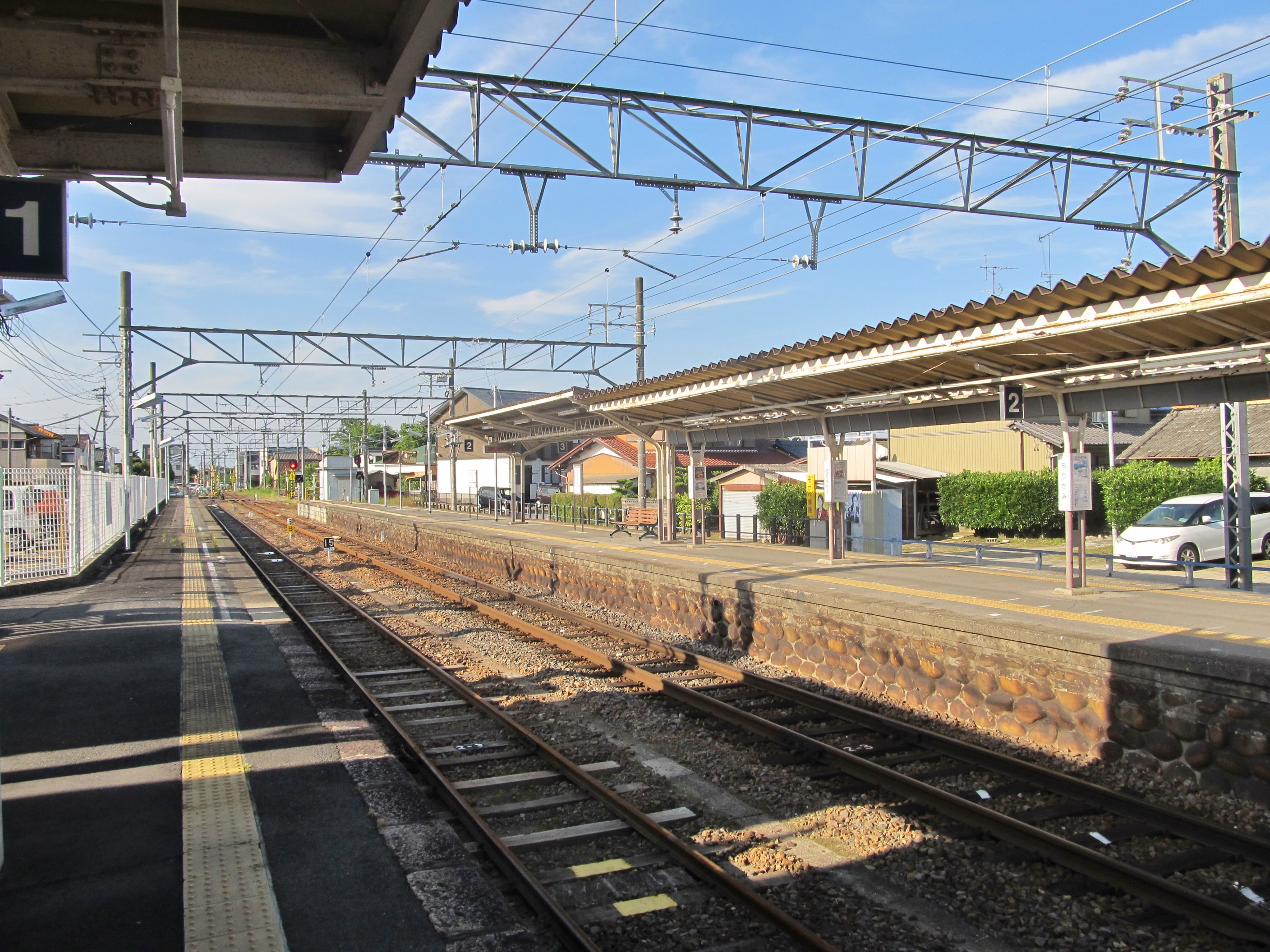
Platforms

track layout

Morikami Station (森上駅, Morikami-eki) is a railway station in the city of Inazawa, Aichi Prefecture, Japan, operated by Meitetsu.

== Lines ==
Morikami Station is served by the Meitetsu Bisai Line, and is located 16.2 kilometers from the starting point of the line at Yatomi.

== Station layout ==
The station has a single side platform, which can serve trains of up to six carriages, and is used with services which terminate at the station. Morikami Station also has a shorter island platform, which can serve trains of up to four carriages in length. The station has automated ticket machines, Manaca automated turnstiles and is staffed.

=== Platforms ===
1	■ Bisai Line	For Tsushima
2	■ Bisai Line	For Hagiwara, Meitetsu-Ichinomiya
3	■ Bisai Line	For Tsushima, Sukaguchi

== Adjacent stations ==
«	Service	»
Meitetsu
Bisai Line
Kami-Marubuchi	-	Yamazaki

== Station history ==
Morikami Station was opened on February 17, 1899 as a station on the privately held Bisai Railroad, which was purchased by Meitetsu on August 1, 1925 becoming the Meitetsu Bisai Line. A new station building was completed in 2007.

== Passenger statistics ==
In fiscal 2017, the station was used by an average of 3,194 passengers daily.

== Surrounding area ==
- former Sobue town hall
- Kyowa High School

== See also ==
- List of railway stations in Japan
