= Meitetsu Ichinomiya Station =

Railway station in Ichinomiya, Aichi Prefecture, Japan

Meitetsu Ichinomiya Station 名鉄一宮駅

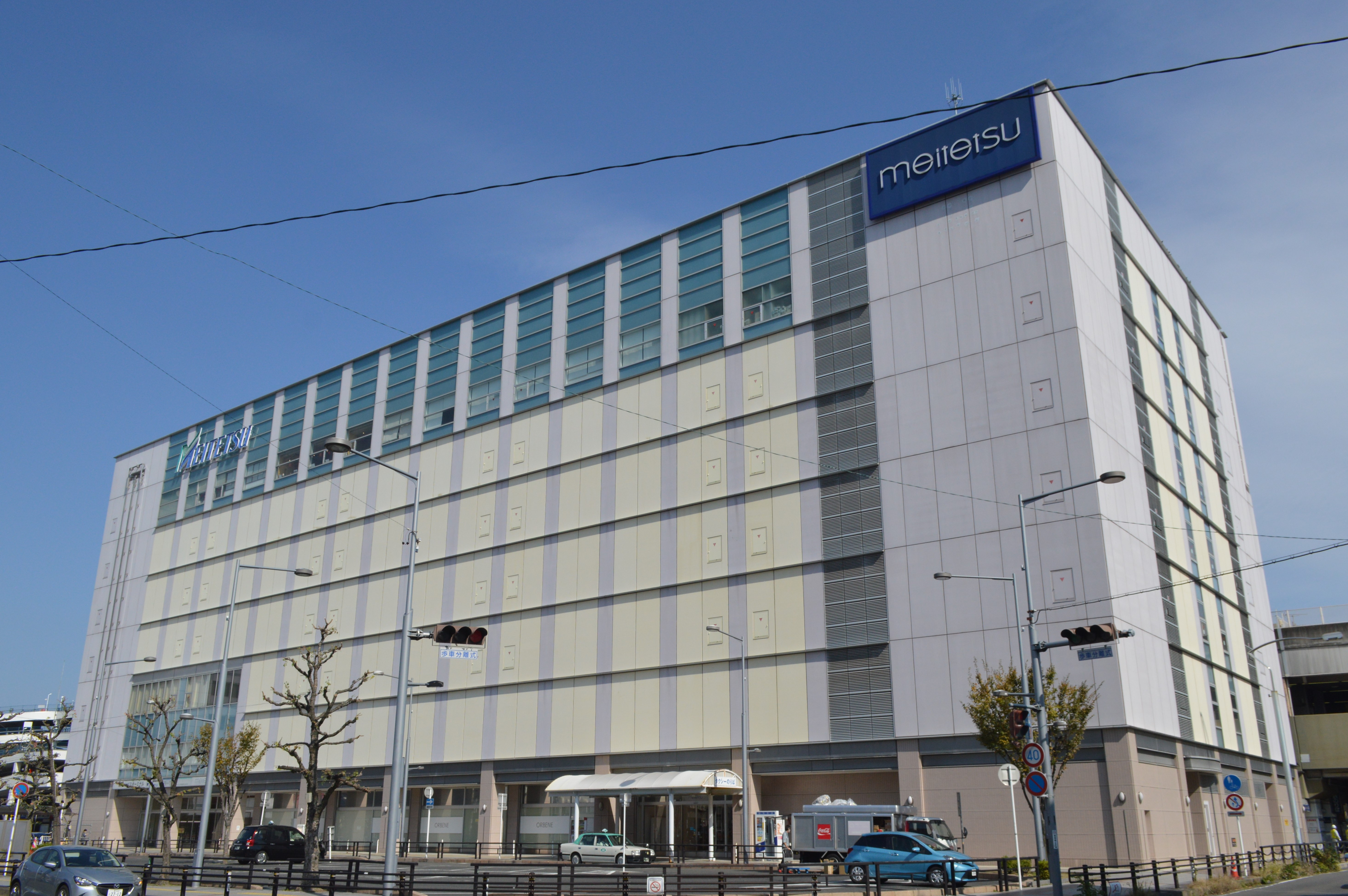
- Meitetsu Ichinomiya Station building, 2020

General information
- Location: 1-1-1 Shinsei, Ichinomiya-shi, Aichi-ken 491-091; Japan
- Coordinates: 35.301747°N 136.797091°E
- Operator: Meitetsu
- Lines: Nagoya Main Line; Bisai Line
- Distance: 86.4 kilometers from Toyohashi
- Platforms: 2 island platforms

Other information
- Status: Staffed
- Station code: NH50
- Website: Official website

History
- Opened: 24 January 1900
- Former names: Shin-Ichinomiya (until 2005)

Passengers
- FY2006: 17,188 daily

Services
Preceding station	Meitetsu	Following station
Kōnomiya towards Central Japan International Airport	μSky	Meitetsu Gifu Terminus
Kōnomiya towards Toyohashi	Nagoya Main Line Rapid Limited Express Limited Express Express	Shin-Kisogawa towards Meitetsu Gifu
Kōnomiya towards Central Japan International Airport	Nagoya Main Line Rapid Express	Shin-Kisogawa towards Meitetsu Gifu
Kōnomiya towards Ina	Nagoya Main Line Semi-Express	Shin-Kisogawa towards Meitetsu Gifu
Myōkōji towards Ina	Nagoya Main Line Local	Imaise towards Meitetsu Gifu
Kannonji towards Yatomi	Bisai Line Local	Nishi-Ichinomiya towards Tamanoi
Location
- Location within Aichi Prefecture Location within Japan

Track layout

Meitetsu Ichinomiya Station (名鉄一宮駅, Meitetsu Ichinomiya-eki) is a railway station in the city of Ichinomiya, Aichi Prefecture, Japan, operated by Meitetsu.

== Lines ==
Meitetsu Ichinomiya Station is served by the Meitetsu Nagoya Main Line and is 86.4 kilometers from the starting point of the line at Toyohashi. It is also served by the Meitetsu Bisai Line, and is located 25.3 kilometers from the starting point of that line at Yatomi.

== Station layout ==
The station has two elevated island platforms, with the station building underneath. The station has automated ticket machines, Manaca automated turnstiles, and is staffed. The station is physically joined to JR Central's Owari-Ichinomiya Station.

=== Platforms ===
1	■ Meitetsu Bisai Line	for Morikami and Tsushima
1	■ Meitetsu Bisai Line	for Okuchō and Tamanoi
2	■ Meitetsu Nagoya Main Line	for Kasamatsu and Meitetsu Gifu
3	■ Meitetsu Nagoya Main Line	for Meitetsu Nagoya and Meitetsu Gifu
4	■ Meitetsu Nagoya Main Line	for Meitetsu Nagoya, Higashi-Okazaki, and Toyohashi

== Station history ==
The station opened on 24 January 1900 as Shin-Ichinomiya Station (新一宮駅). It was renamed Meitetsu Ichinomiya on 29 January 2005. The station was reopened as an elevated station on 21 February 1993.

== Passenger statistics ==
In fiscal 2016, the station was used by an average of 17,700 passengers daily.

== Surrounding area ==
- Meitetsu department store
- Masumida Shrine
- National Route 155
- Shubun University

== See also ==
- List of railway stations in Japan
