= Japan National Route 155 =

National highway in Japan

National Route 155
- 国道155号
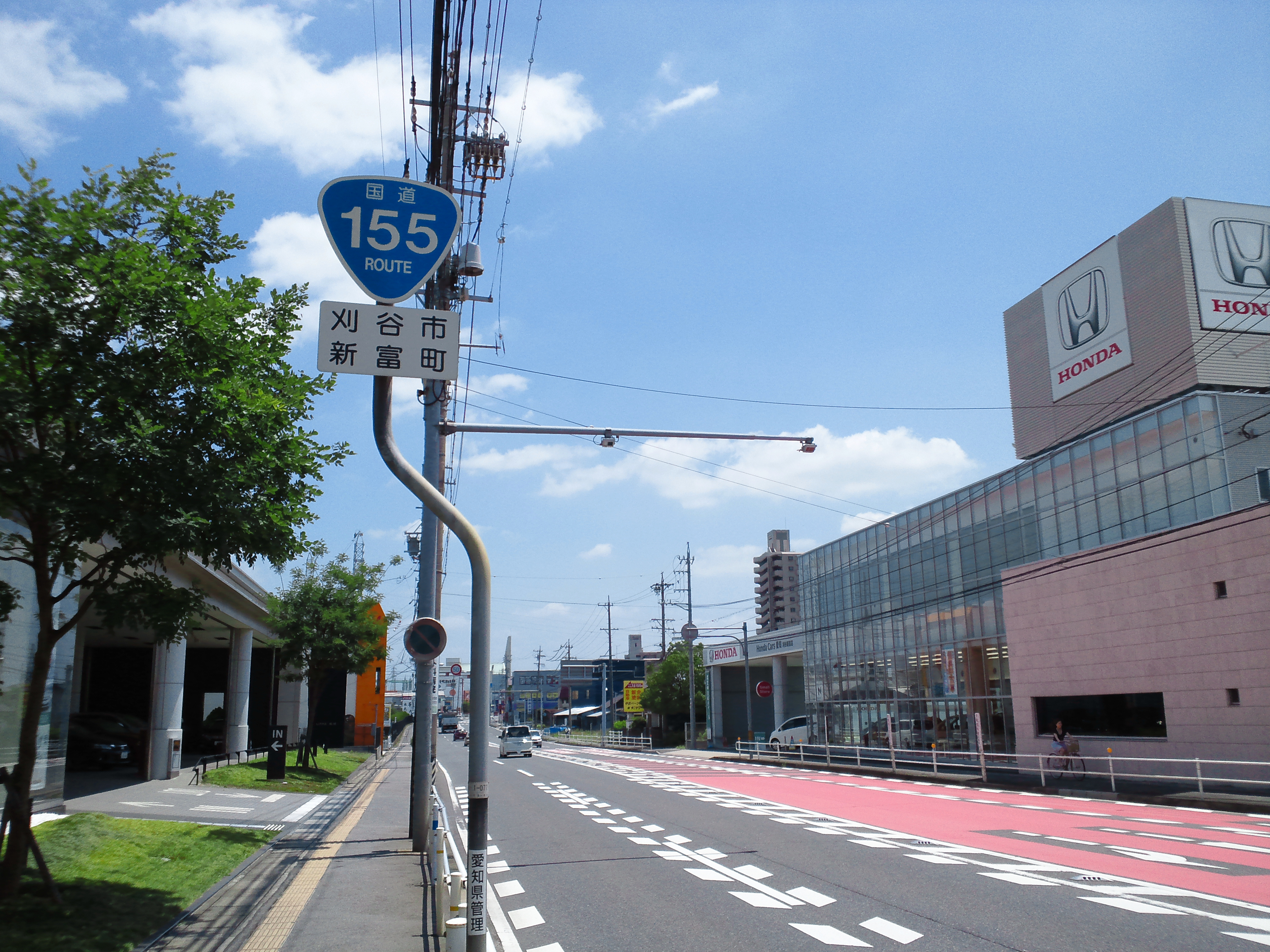

Route information
- Length: 126.9 km (78.9 mi)
- Existed: 1963–present

Major junctions
- Loop around Nagoya
- CCW end: National Route 1 / Prefectural Route 105 in Yatomi, Aichi
- CW end: National Route 247 in Tokoname, Aichi

Location
- Country: Japan

Highway system
- National highways of Japan; Expressways of Japan
← National Route 154	→ National Route 156

National Route 155 is a national highway of Japan connecting Tokoname, Aichi and Yatomi, Aichi in Japan, with a total length of 126.9 km (78.9 mi). It serves as Nagoya's outer loop.

== History ==
Route 155 was originally designated on 18 May 1953 from Nagoya to Toyama. This was redesignated as Route 41 in 1959. The current routing of Route 155 dates from 1963.
