= Yatomi Station =

Railway station in Yatomi, Aichi Prefecture, Japan

CJ05 Yatomi Station 弥富駅

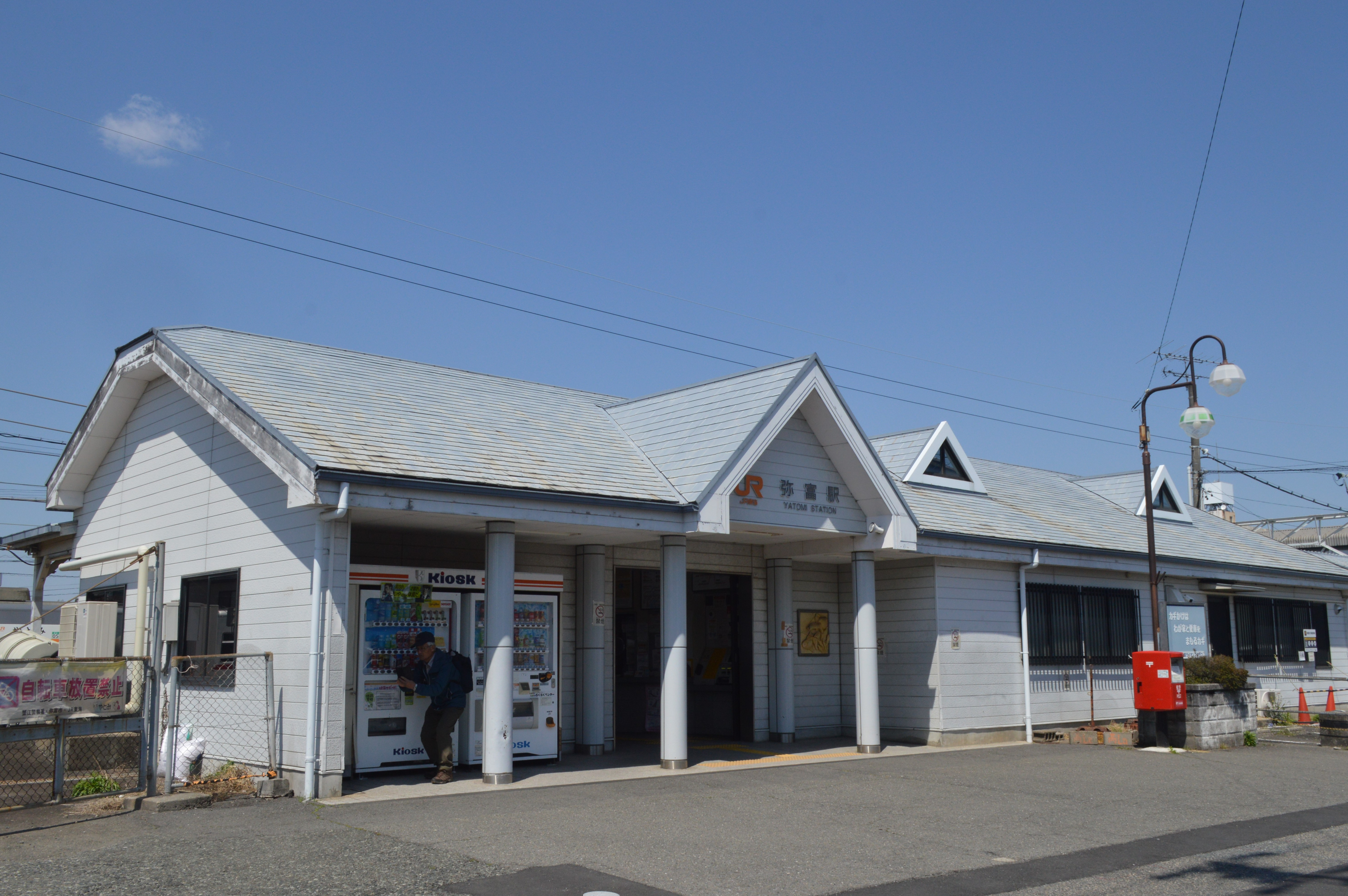
- Yatomi Station

General information
- Location: Nakaroku-178 Uguiurachō, Yatomi-shi, Aichi-ken 498-0028; Japan
- Coordinates: 35°6′49.9″N 136°43′32.3″E
- Operator: JR Central; Meitetsu
- Lines: Kansai Main Line; ■ Bisai Line
- Distance: 16.4 kilometers from Nagoya
- Platforms: 1 side + 1 island platforms

Other information
- Status: Staffed
- Station code: CJ05, TB11

History
- Opened: May 24, 1895
- Former names: Maegasu (until 1895)

Passengers
- 2006: 380,785
Location
- Location within Aichi Prefecture Location within Japan

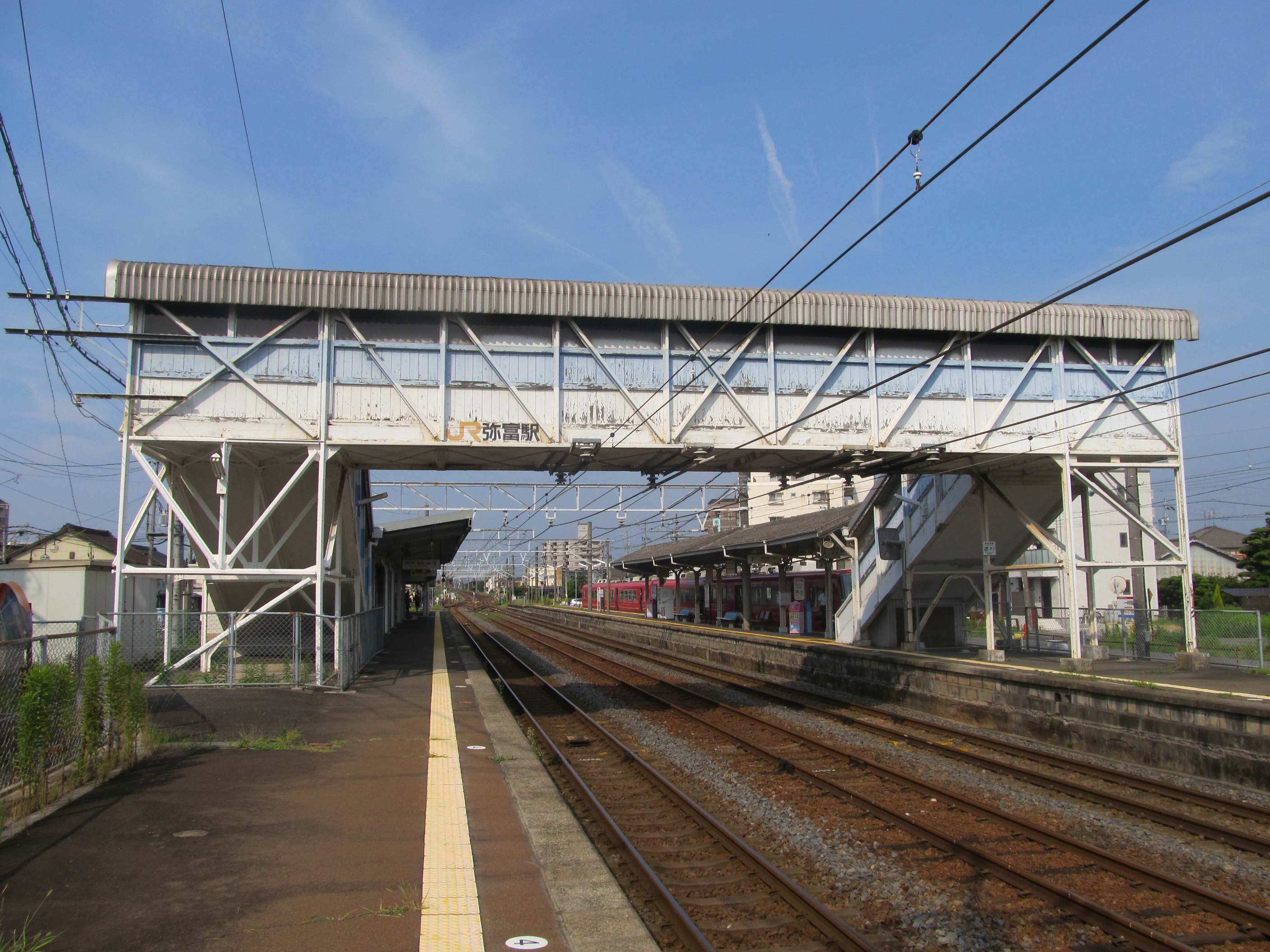
Platforms

Track layout

Yatomi Station (弥富駅, Yatomi-eki) is a junction railway station in the city of Yatomi, Aichi Prefecture, Japan, operated by Central Japan Railway Company (JR Tōkai) and the private railway company, Nagoya Railway (Meitetsu). The station's elevation is 0.93 m below sea level, the lowest among all above-ground stations of JR Group.

== Lines ==
Yatomi Station is served by the Kansai Main Line, and is located 16.4 kilometers from the starting point of the line at Nagoya Station. It is also a terminal station for the Meitetsu Bisai Line and is 30.9 kilometers from the opposing terminal of the line at Tamanoi.

== Station layout ==
The station has a single side platform used by the Kansai Main Line, and a single island platform, shared by the Kansai Main Line and the Meitetsu Bisai Line, connected by a footbridge. The station is staffed.

=== Platforms ===
1	■ JR Central Kansai Line	for Kuwana, Yokkaichi and Kameyama
2	■ JR Central Kansai Line	for Nagoya
3	■ Meitetsu Bisai Line	for Tsushima

== Adjacent stations ==
«	Service	»
Central Japan Railway Company (JR Central)
Kansai Main Line
Eiwa	Local	Nagashima
Kanie	Semi Rapid	Kuwana
Rapid: Does not stop at this station
Rapid "Mie": Does not stop at this station
Limited Express "Nanki": Does not stop at this station
Nagoya Railroad
Bisai Line
Terminus	-	Gonosan

== Station history ==
Yatomi Station was first opened on May 24, 1895 as Maegasu Station (前ヶ須駅, Maegasu-eki), on the privately held Kansai Railroad. It was renamed to its present name on November 7, 1895. The Kansai Railroad was nationalized in 1907 and became the Kansai Line of the Japanese Government Railways (JGR). On April 3, 1898, Yatomi Station also became a terminal of a section of line operated by the Bisai Railroad, which was bought by Meitetsu on August 1, 1925, and in the process became a station on the Meitetsu Bisai Line as it is today. The JGR became the JNR (Japan National Railways) after World War II. Freight operations were discontinued from October 1, 1980. With the privatization of the JNR on April 1, 1987, the station came under the control of JR Central. Automatic wicket gates using the TOICA smart card were installed from October 25, 2006.

Station numbering was introduced to the section of the Kansai Main Line operated JR Central in March 2018; Yatomi Station was assigned station number CI05.

== Surrounding area ==
- Yatomi City Hall

== See also ==
- List of railway stations in Japan
