= Manaca =

Contactless smart card used in Japan

manaca
- Location: Usable nationwide Distributed in the Greater Nagoya Area
- Launched: February 11, 2011
- Technology: FeliCa
- Manager: Nagoya City Transportation Bureau and Meitetsu
- Currency: Japanese yen (¥20,000 maximum load)
- Stored-value: Pay as you go
- Credit expiry: None
- Retailed: Nagoya Municipal Subway stations; Meitetsu stations; Aonami Line stations; Linimo stations; Toyohashi Railroad stations
- Website: www.kotsu.city.nagoya.jp/en/pc/manaca/ manaca.meitetsu.co.jp

How to use Manaca in a ticket gate

Manaca (マナカ, Manaka), stylized in lowercase as manaca, is a rechargeable contactless smart card used in Nagoya, Japan and the surrounding area in Aichi Prefecture. It launched on February 11, 2011, replacing the Tranpass magnetic fare card system. Since 2013, it has been part of Japan's Nationwide Mutual Usage Service, allowing it to be used in all major cities across the country.

== Etymology ==
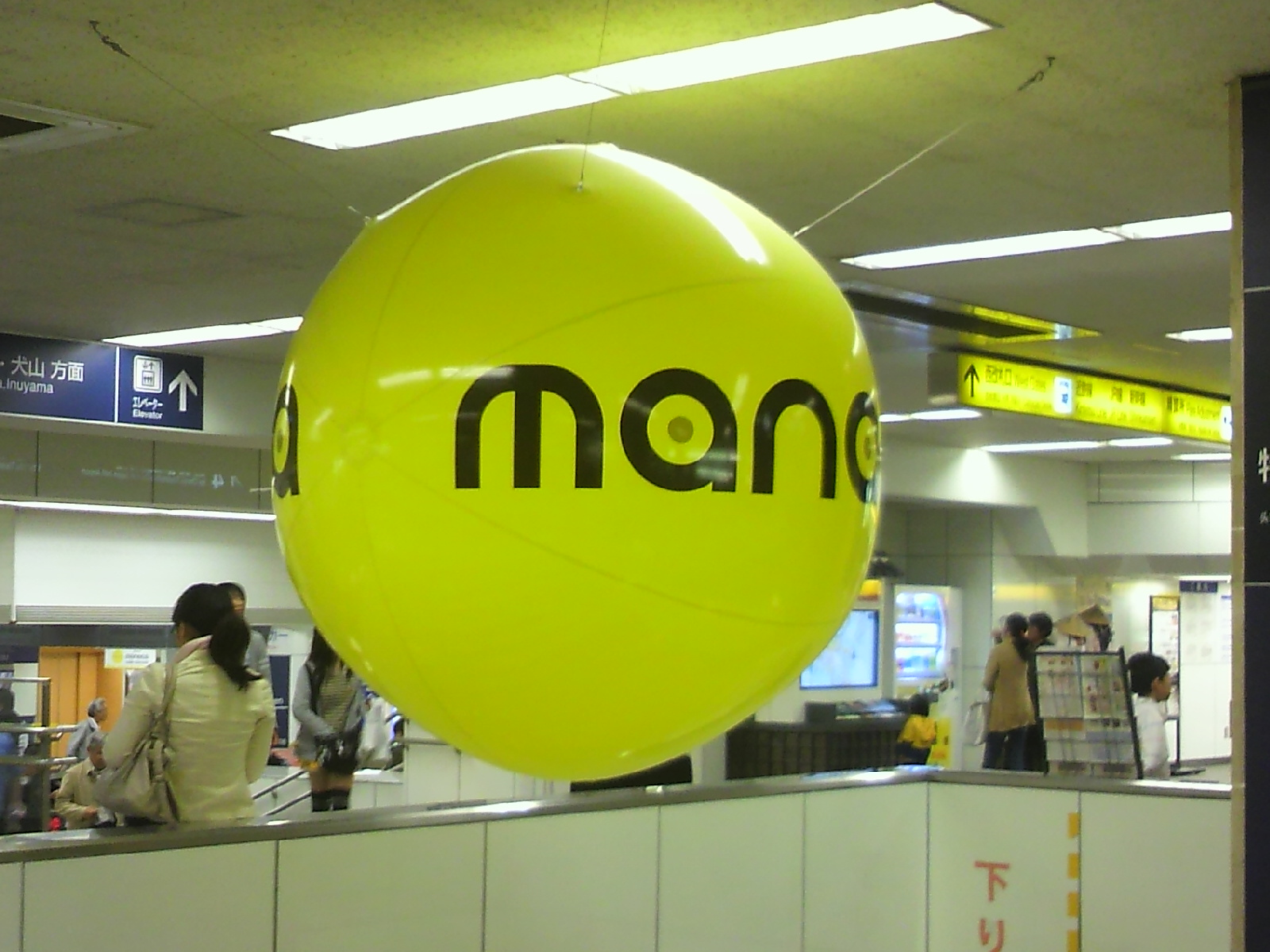
Balloons used to celebrate Manaca's launch

The name comes from the Japanese word mannaka (真ん中), meaning "center", because Nagoya is roughly in the center of Japan, and because it claims to be a central part of riders' lifestyles. The card is administered by both the Nagoya City Transportation Bureau Development Organization and MIC (a subsidiary of Meitetsu); while MIC stylizes the name in romaji as "manaca", the City writes it in katakana.

== Usage ==
Manaca has a feature set similar to other prepaid IC cards used across the country. It provides a convenient method of payment for train and bus fares while also being accepted as payment at some shops, restaurants, and vending machines.

Manaca can be purchased from ticket machines located in city subway, city bus, and Meitetsu bus and train stations, and are available in both registered and unregistered form. Registered cards require the buyer to provide their name, date of birth, sex, and phone number, but can be replaced if lost or stolen. A registered card is also required in order to purchase a commuter pass. When a new or replacement card is issued, a 500 yen deposit is required, along with a minimum charge of an additional 500 yen. The deposit is refundable if the card is returned. Credit can be added to an existing card inserting it into a compatible credit terminal at any station, choosing the amount to add, and inserting bills or coins.

=== Points ===
There are two kinds of point systems for Manaca: mileage points and Tamarun points. The point systems vary depending on the card's issuer, printed on the back of the card in the bottom left.

All cards accumulate mileage points whereas MIC cards can, when registered, also accumulate Meitetsu's Tamarun points.

Mileage points are accumulated from spending money stored on Manaca as transportation fare, such as from riding the subway or non-JR trains. These points are calculated each month and are sent to the "point center" every month on the 10th, and are not automatically credited to the card. In order to use them as fare, riders must redeem them at station ticket machines, ticket windows, or fare-adjustment machines. Despite interoperability with JR Central's TOICA, points cannot be used for JR train fare and are not accumulated by using JR services.

Cards issued by MIC, once registered online, can also accumulate Tamarun points through purchases paid for with the card at participating vendors. Once acquired, Tamarun points can be used at these vendors to make purchases of goods. Unlike mileage points, these points cannot automatically be used as transportation fare.

Points are also preserved when a registered card is replaced due to loss or theft.

=== Discounts ===
When making the following transfers within 90 minutes using a single Manaca, an 80 yen discount is applied:

- City bus ↔ City bus
- City bus ↔ Subway
- City bus ↔ Aonami line
- Subway ↔ Aonami line
- City bus ↔ Yutorito Line Raised Zone (Ozone - Obata Ryokuchi)
- Subway ↔ Yutorito Line Raised Zone (Ozone - Obata Ryokuchi)

== Interoperation ==
Interoperation map

As of March 23, 2013, Manaca began interoperability with nine other major Japanese IC cards as part of Japan's Nationwide Mutual Usage Service, allowing it to be used nationwide. In Nagoya City, it can be used on the following transportation systems:

- Nagoya Municipal Subway lines
- Meitetsu (Nagoya Railroad) lines
- Aonami Line
- Nagoya City Bus
- Meitetsu Bus
- Yutorito Line
- Linimo

It can also be used on other transportation systems across Aichi Prefecture, including the Aichi Loop Line (Aikan) and Toyohashi Railroad.

== See also ==
- Tranpass
- TOICA
- ICOCA
- Suica
