= Kuroda Station =

Kuroda Station is the name of two railway stations in Japan:

- Kuroda Station (Aichi) in Ichinomiya, Aichi served by Meitetsu Nagoya Main Line
- Kuroda Station (Nara) in Tawaramoto, Nara served by Kintetsu Tawaramoto Line
