= Sakura Station =

Sakura Station is a name of multiple rail stations in Japan

- Sakura Station (Aichi) in Aichi Prefecture
- Sakura Station (Mie) in Mie Prefecture
- Sakura Station (Chiba) in Chiba Prefecture
- Keisei-Sakura Station in Chiba Prefecture
