= Ushida Station (Aichi) =

Railway station in Chiryū, Aichi Prefecture, Japan

Ushida Station 牛田駅

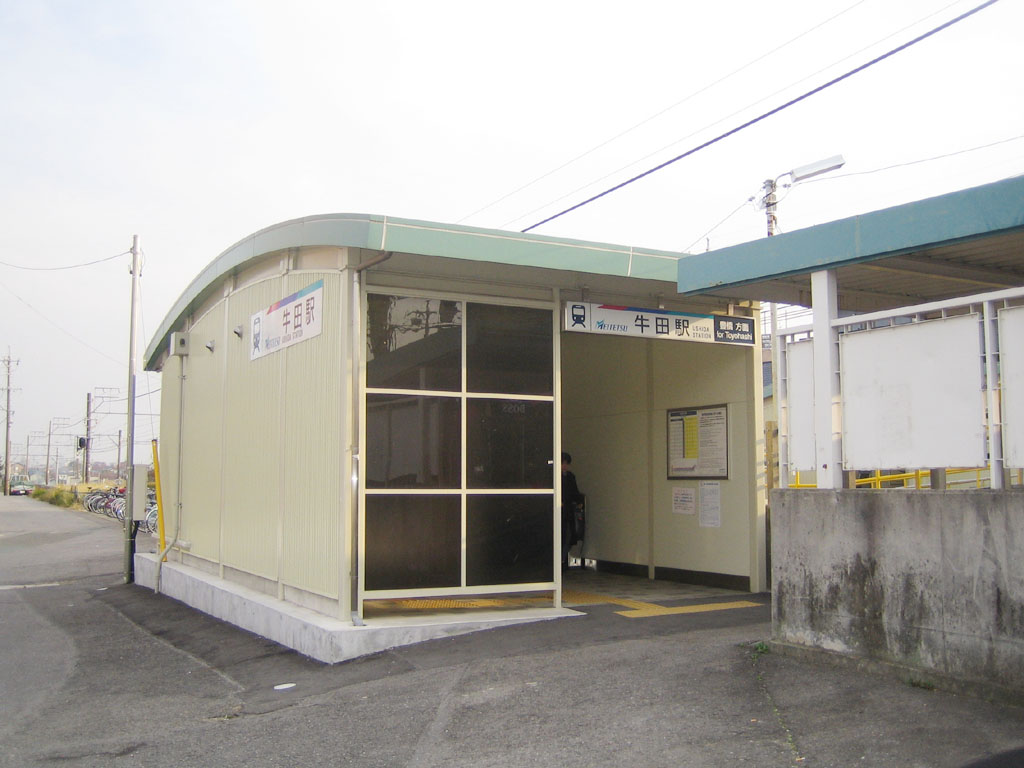
- Ushida Station North Entrance, November 2005

General information
- Location: 1-chōme-84 Ushida, Chiryū-shi, Aichi-ken 472-0003; Japan
- Coordinates: 34.9992°N 137.061°E
- Operator: Meitetsu
- Line: ■ Meitetsu Nagoya Line
- Distance: 40.9 kilometers from Toyohashi
- Platforms: 2 side platforms

Other information
- Status: Unstaffed
- Station code: NH18
- Website: Official website

History
- Opened: 1 June 1923; 103 years ago

Passengers
- FY2017: 4056 daily
Location
- Location within Aichi Prefecture Location within Japan

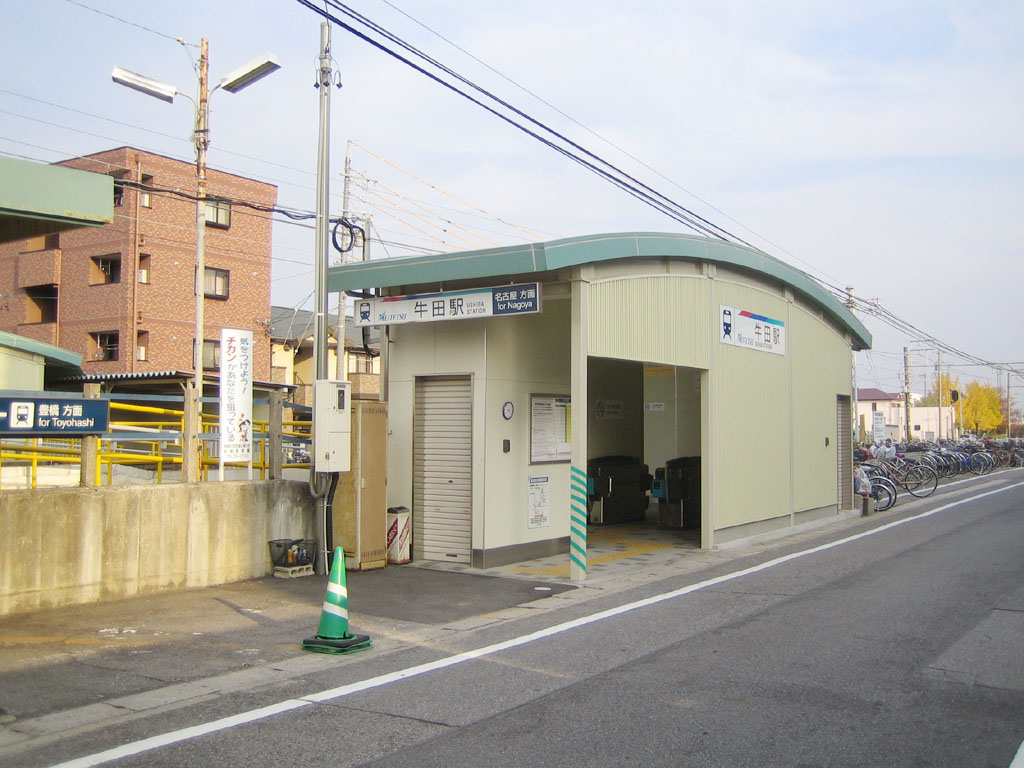
South Entrance

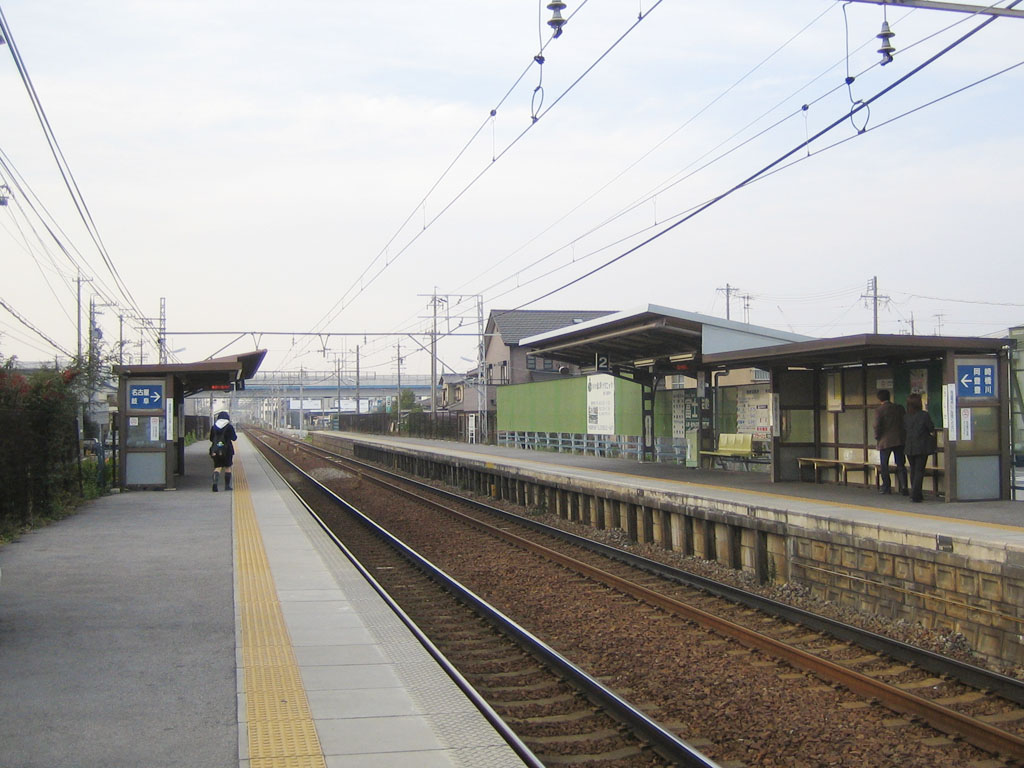
Platforms

Ushida Station (牛田駅, Ushida-eki) is a railway station in the city of Chiryū, Aichi, Japan, operated by Meitetsu.

== Lines ==
Ushida Station is served by the Meitetsu Nagoya Main Line and is 40.9 kilometers from the terminus of the line at Toyohashi Station.

== Station layout ==
The station has two opposed side platforms connected by a level crossing. The station is unattended.

=== Platforms ===
1	■ Nagoya Main Line	For Meitetsu Nagoya, Meitetsu Gifu, and Inuyama
2	■ Nagoya Main Line	For Higashi Okazaki and Toyohashi

== Adjacent stations ==
←	Service	→
Meitetsu Nagoya Main Line
Shin Anjō	Semi Express (準急) (only one train stops)	Chiryū
Shin Anjō	Local (普通)	Chiryū

== Station history ==
Ushida Station was opened on 1 June 1923, as a station on the Aichi Electric Railway. On 1 April 1935, the Aichi Electric Railway merged with the Nagoya Railroad (the forerunner of present-day Meitetsu). A new station building was completed in September 1992. The station has been unattended since 2004.

== Passenger statistics ==
In fiscal 2017, the station was used by an average of 4,056 passengers daily (boarding passengers only).

== Surrounding area ==
- Chiryū Higashi High School

== See also ==
- List of railway stations in Japan
