= Shinkawabashi Station =

Railway station in Kiyosu, Aichi Prefecture, Japan

Shinkawabashi Station 新川橋駅

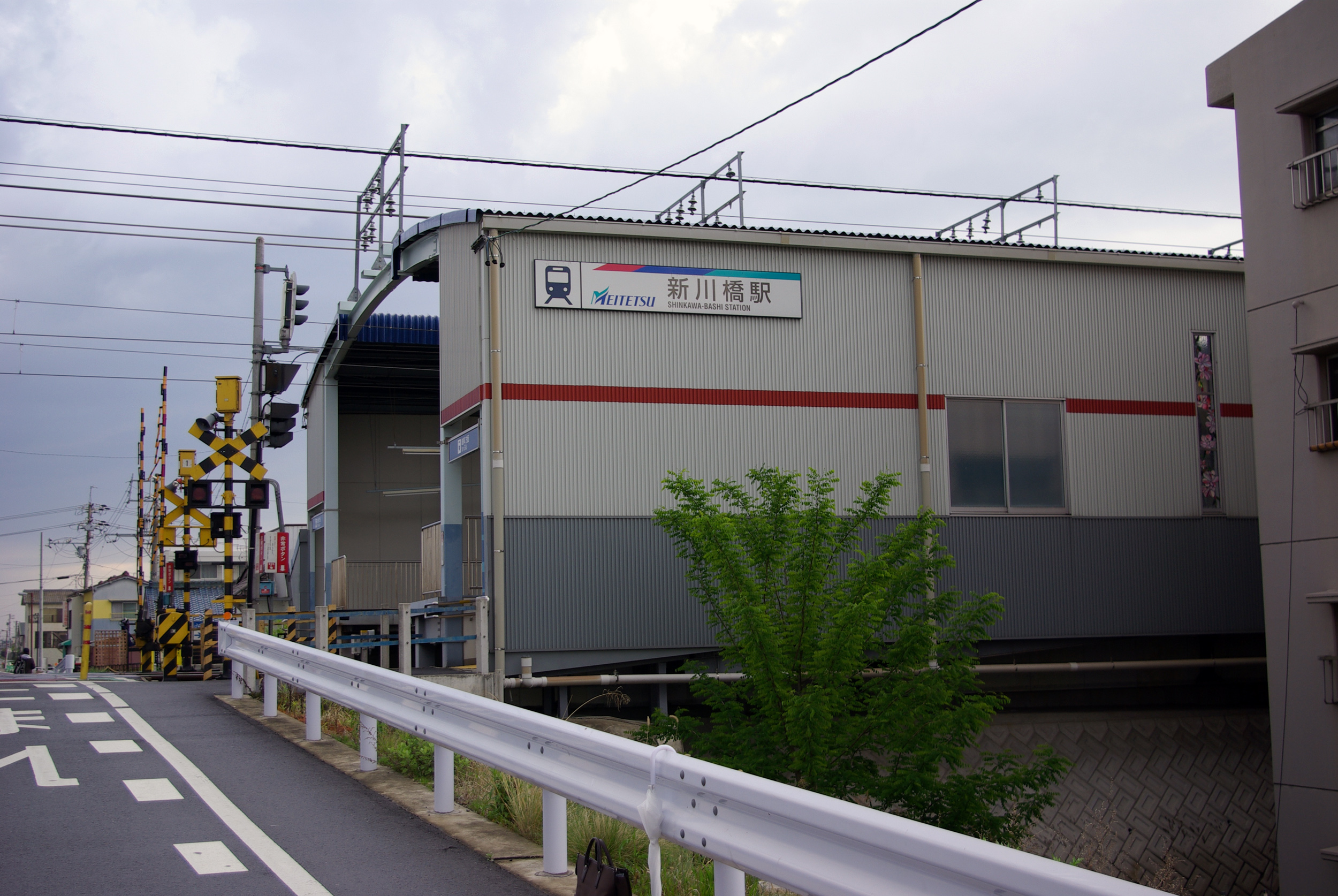
- Shinkawabashi Station in April 2009

General information
- Location: Dokino 199-1, Kiyosu-shi, Aichi-ken 452-0914; Japan
- Coordinates: 35.1956°N 136.8522°E
- Operator: Meitetsu
- Line: ■ Meitetsu Nagoya Main Line
- Distance: 72.8 kilometers from Toyohashi
- Platforms: 2 side platforms
- Tracks: 2

Construction
- Structure type: At-grade
- Accessible: Yes

Other information
- Status: Unstaffed
- Station code: NH41
- Website: Official website

History
- Opened: January 23, 1914

Passengers
- FY2013: 647

Services
Preceding station	Meitetsu	Following station
Futatsuiri towards Toyohashi	Nagoya Main Line Local	Sukaguchi towards Meitetsu Gifu
Location
- Location within Aichi Prefecture Location within Japan

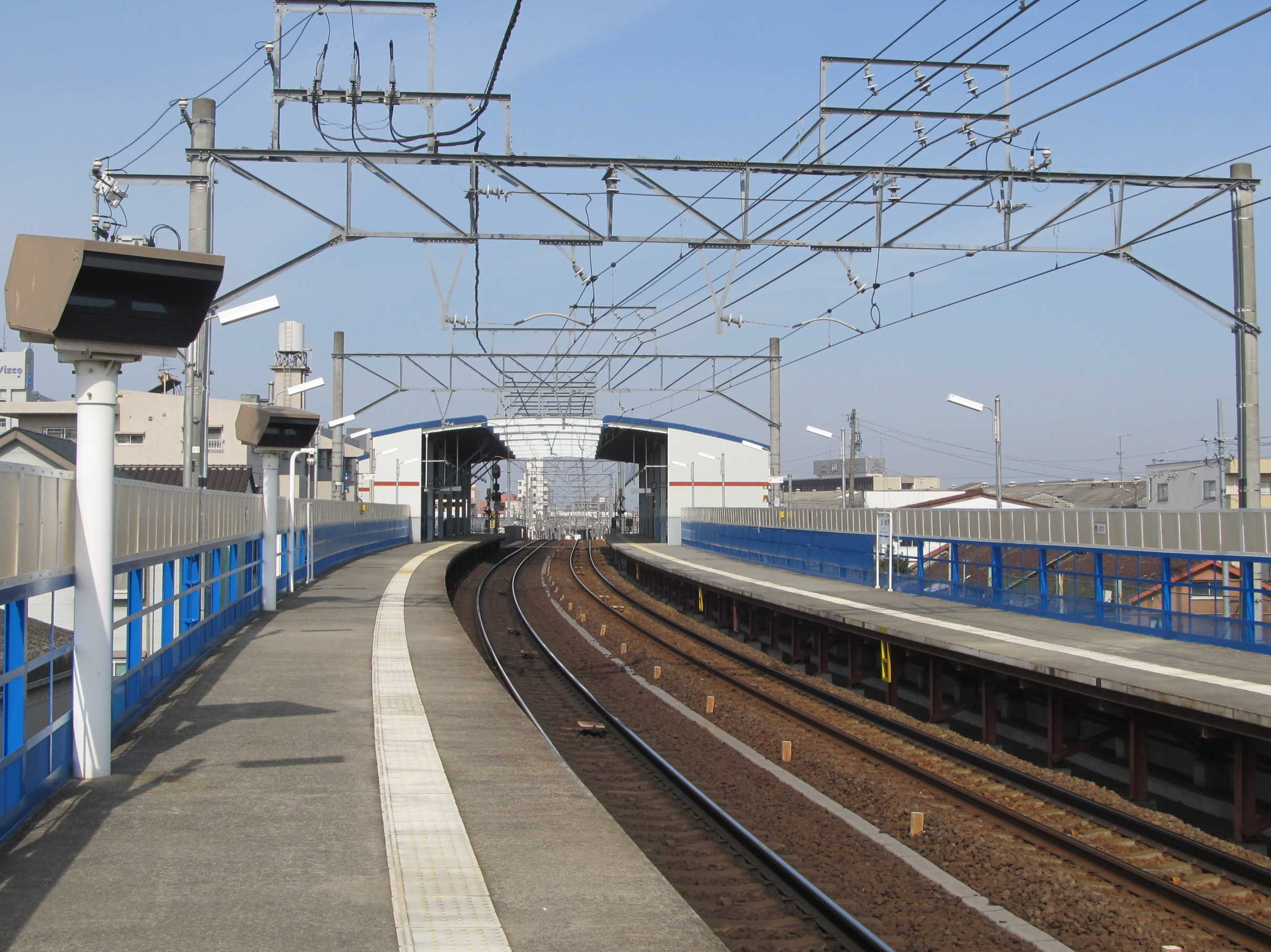
Platforms

Shinkawabashi Station (新川橋駅, Shinkawabashi-eki) is a railway station in the city of Kiyosu, Aichi Prefecture, Japan, operated by Meitetsu.

== Lines ==
Shinkawabashi Station is served by the Meitetsu Nagoya Main Line, and is located 72.8 kilometers from the starting point of the line at Toyohashi.

== Station layout ==
The station has two elevated island platforms. The station has automated ticket machines, Manaca automated turnstiles and is unattended.

=== Platforms ===
1	■ Nagoya Main Line	For Meitetsu-Ichinomiya and Meitetsu-Gifu
2	■ Nagoya Main Line	For Meitetsu-Nagoya and Kanayama

== Station history ==
Shinkawabashi Station was opened on January 23, 1914 as a station on the privately held Nagoya Electric Railway.

== Passenger statistics ==
In fiscal 2013, the station was used by an average of 647 passengers daily.

== Surrounding area ==
- Kiyosu City Hall

== See also ==
- List of railway stations in Japan
