= Kanō Station (Gifu) =

Railway station in Gifu, Gifu Prefecture, Japan

Kanō Station 加納駅

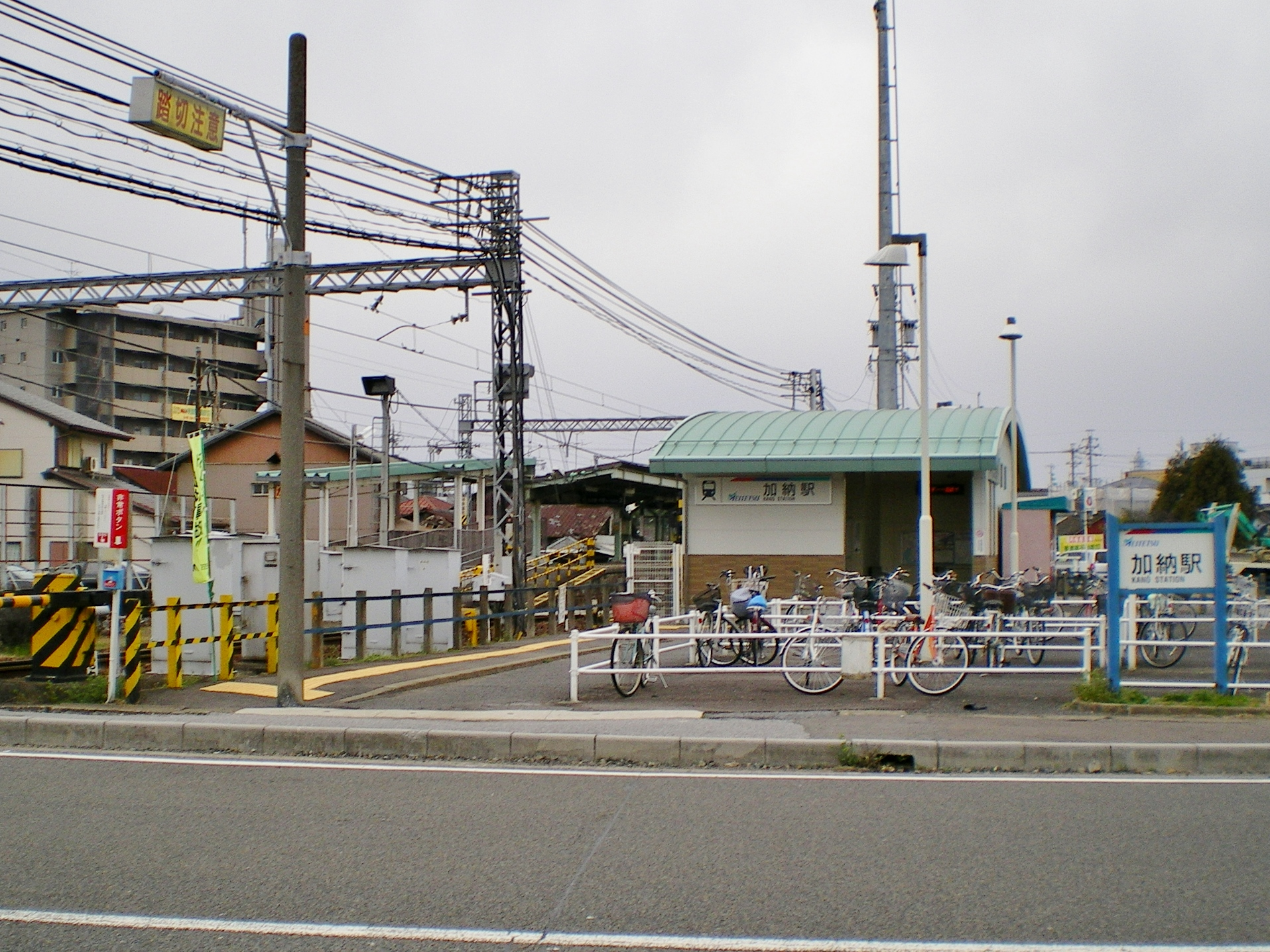
- Kanō Station in March 2010

General information
- Location: Kanoshinyanagimachi, Gifu-shi, Gifu-ken 500-8421; Japan
- Coordinates: 35.4051°N 136.766°E
- Operator: Meitetsu
- Line: ■Meitetsu Nagoya Main Line
- Distance: 98.7km from Toyohashi
- Platforms: 1 island platform

Other information
- Status: Unstaffed
- Station code: NH59
- Website: Official website (in Japanese)

History
- Opened: June 2, 1914
- Former names: Arata Station (until 1959)

Passengers
- FY2013: 530

Services
Preceding station	Meitetsu	Following station
Chajo towards Toyohashi	Nagoya Main Line Local	Meitetsu Gifu Terminus
Location
- Location within Japan

Kanō Station (加納駅, Kanō-eki) is a railway station located in the city of Gifu, Gifu Prefecture, Japan, operated by the private railway operator Meitetsu.

== Lines ==
Kanō Station is a station on the Nagoya Main Line, and is located 98.7 kilometers from the terminus of the line at Toyohashi.

== Station layout ==
track layout

Kanō Station has a ground-level island platform serving two tracks. The platform is connected to the station building by a level crossing. The station is unattended.

=== Platforms ===
1	■ Meitetsu Nagoya Main Line	For Meitetsu-Gifu
2	■ Meitetsu Nagoya Main Line	For Meitetsu-Ichinomiya, Meitetsu-Nagoya, and Shin-Hashima

=== Services ===
The station is served every fifteen minutes for Meitetsu Gifu and Sukaguchi, except early morning and late night.

== History ==
Kanō Station opened on June 2, 1914 as Arata Station (安良田町駅). It was renamed Kanō Station on January 10, 1959.

== Surrounding area ==
The station is located in a residential area.

== See also ==
- List of railway stations in Japan
