= Futatsu-iri Station =

Railway station in Kiyosu, Aichi Prefecture, Japan

Futatsuiri Station 二ツ杁駅

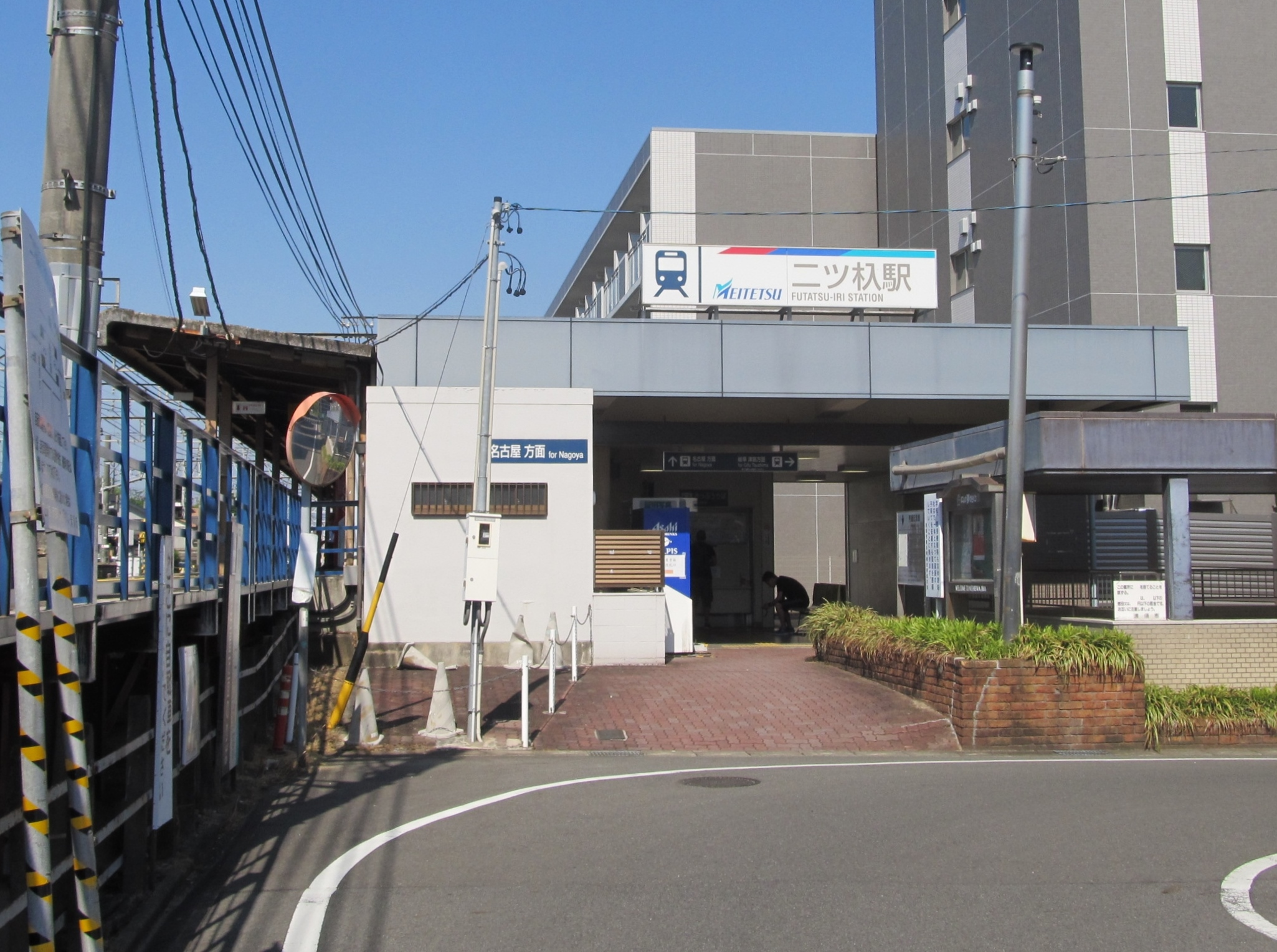
- Futatsu-iri Station exit in May 2018

General information
- Location: 2-59 Nishibiwajima-chō Yoshino, Kiyosu-shi, Aichi-ken 452-0065; Japan
- Coordinates: 35.1945°N 136.8598°E
- Operator: Meitetsu
- Line: ■ Meitetsu Nagoya Main Line
- Distance: 72.2 kilometers from Toyohashi
- Platforms: 2 side platforms

Other information
- Status: Unstaffed
- Station code: NH40
- Website: Official website

History
- Opened: February 1, 1942

Passengers
- FY2013: 2708
Location
- Location within Aichi Prefecture Location within Japan

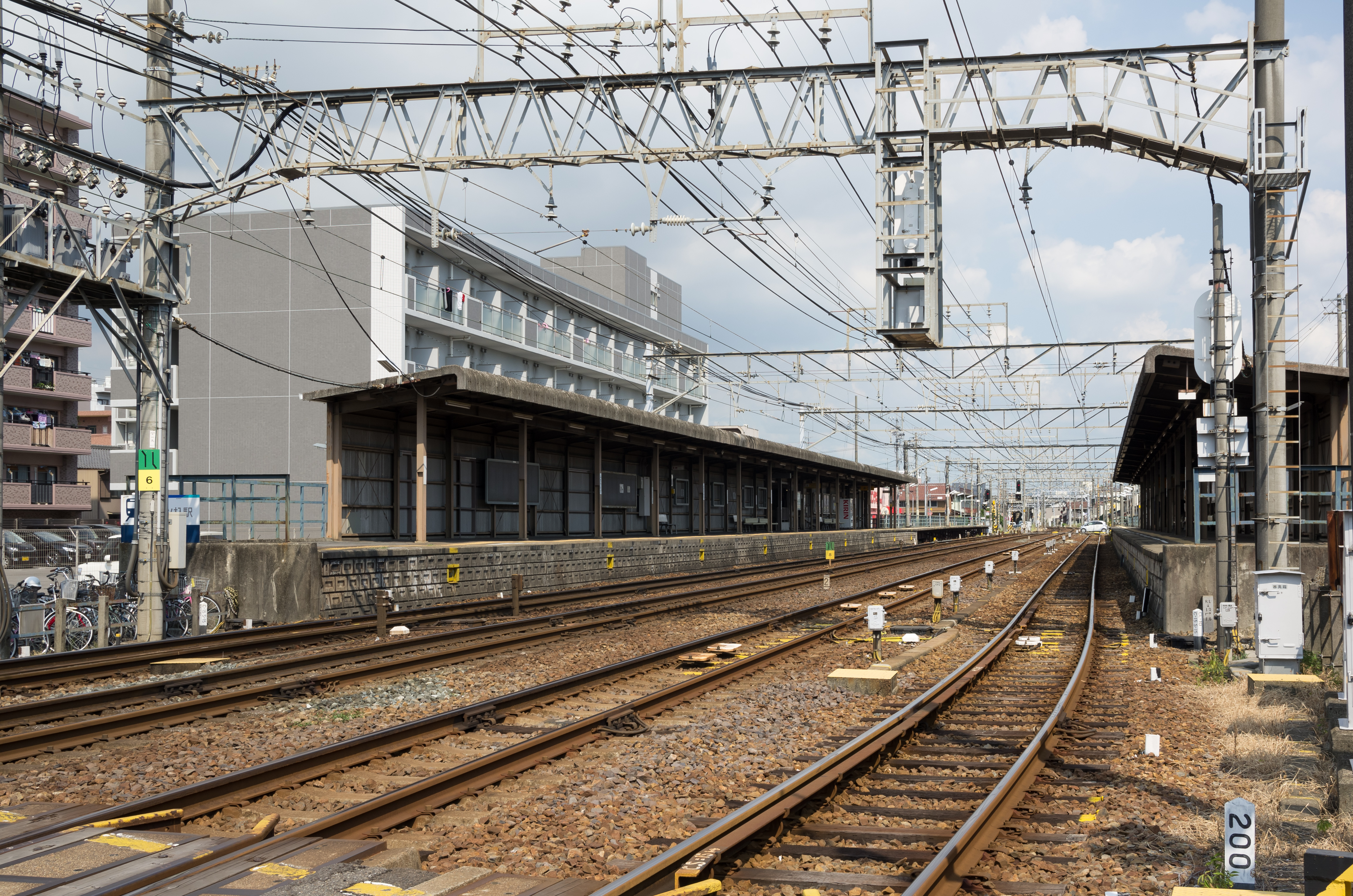
Platforms

Futatsu-iri Station (二ツ杁駅, Futatsu-iri eki) is a railway station in the city of Kiyosu, Aichi Prefecture, Japan, operated by Meitetsu.

== Lines ==
Futatsu-iri Station is served by the Meitetsu Nagoya Main Line, and is located 72.2 kilometers from the starting point of the line at Toyohashi.

== Station layout ==
The station has two unnumbered side platforms on passing loops, connected by an underground passage. The station has automated ticket machines, Manaca automated turnstiles and is unattended.

=== Platforms ===
South	■ Nagoya Main Line	For Meitetsu-Ichinomiya and Meitetsu-Gifu
North	■ Nagoya Main Line	For Meitetsu-Nagoya and Kanayama

== Adjacent stations ==
←	Service	→
Meitetsu Nagoya Main Line
Sakō	Express (some trains stop)	Sukaguchi
Sakō	Semi Express	Sukaguchi
Nishi-Biwajima	Local	Shinkawabashi

== Station history ==
Futatsu-iri Station was opened on February 1, 1942. The station was rebuilt in November 1984, and became unattended from March 2004.

== Passenger statistics ==
In fiscal 2013, the station was used by an average of 2708 passengers daily.

== Surrounding area ==
- Mitsubishi Heavy Industries Kiyosu plant
- Meiji Chewing Gum

== See also ==
- List of railway stations in Japan
