= Imaise Station =

Railway station in Ichinomiya, Aichi Prefecture, Japan

Imaise Station 今伊勢駅

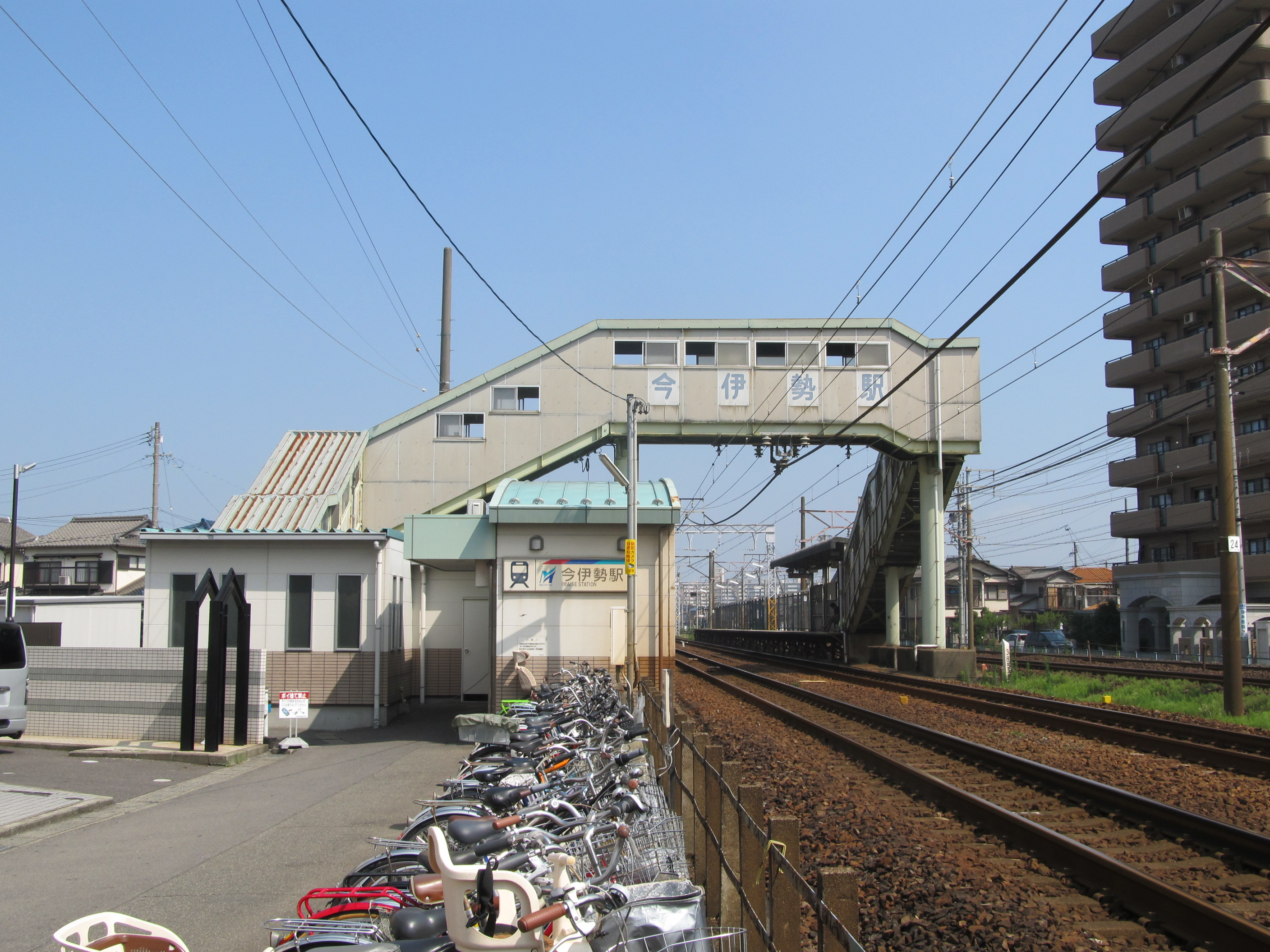
- Imaise Station in July 2013

General information
- Location: Itchōno-40 Imaise-chō Miyaushiro, Ichinomiya-shi, Aichi-ken 491-0057; Japan
- Coordinates: 35.3184°N 136.7891°E
- Operator: Meitetsu
- Line: ■ Meitetsu Nagoya Line
- Distance: 88.3 kilometers from Toyohashi
- Platforms: 2 side platforms
- Tracks: 2

Construction
- Structure type: At-grade
- Accessible: Yes

Other information
- Status: Unstaffed
- Station code: NH51
- Website: Official website

History
- Opened: April 29, 1935

Passengers
- FY2008: 1214 daily

Services
| Preceding station | Meitetsu | Following station |
|---|---|---|
| Meitetsu Ichinomiya towards Toyohashi | Nagoya Main Line Local | Iwato towards Meitetsu Gifu |
Location
- Location within Aichi Prefecture Location within Japan

Imaise Station (今伊勢駅, Imaise-eki) is a railway station in the city of Ichinomiya, Aichi Prefecture, Japan, operated by Meitetsu.

== Lines ==
Imaise Station is served by the Meitetsu Nagoya Main Line and is 88.3 kilometers from the terminus of the line at Toyohashi Station.

== Station layout ==
The station has two opposed side platforms connected by a footbridge. The station has automated ticket machines, Manaca automated turnstiles, and is unattended.

=== Platforms ===
| 1 | ■ Meitetsu Nagoya Main Line | For Kasamatsu, and Meitetsu Gifu |
| 2 | ■ Meitetsu Nagoya Main Line | For Meitetsu Ichinomiya, Meitetsu Nagoya, and Toyohashi |

== Station history ==
Imaise Station was opened on April 29, 1935.

== Passenger statistics ==
In fiscal 2013, the station was used by an average of 2905 passengers daily.

== Surrounding area ==
- Imaise Cardiac Center
- Japan Wool Textile Industry Co Ltd Ichinomiya plant

== See also ==
- List of railway stations in Japan
