= Miai Station =

Railway station in Okazaki, Aichi Prefecture, Japan

Miai Station 美合駅

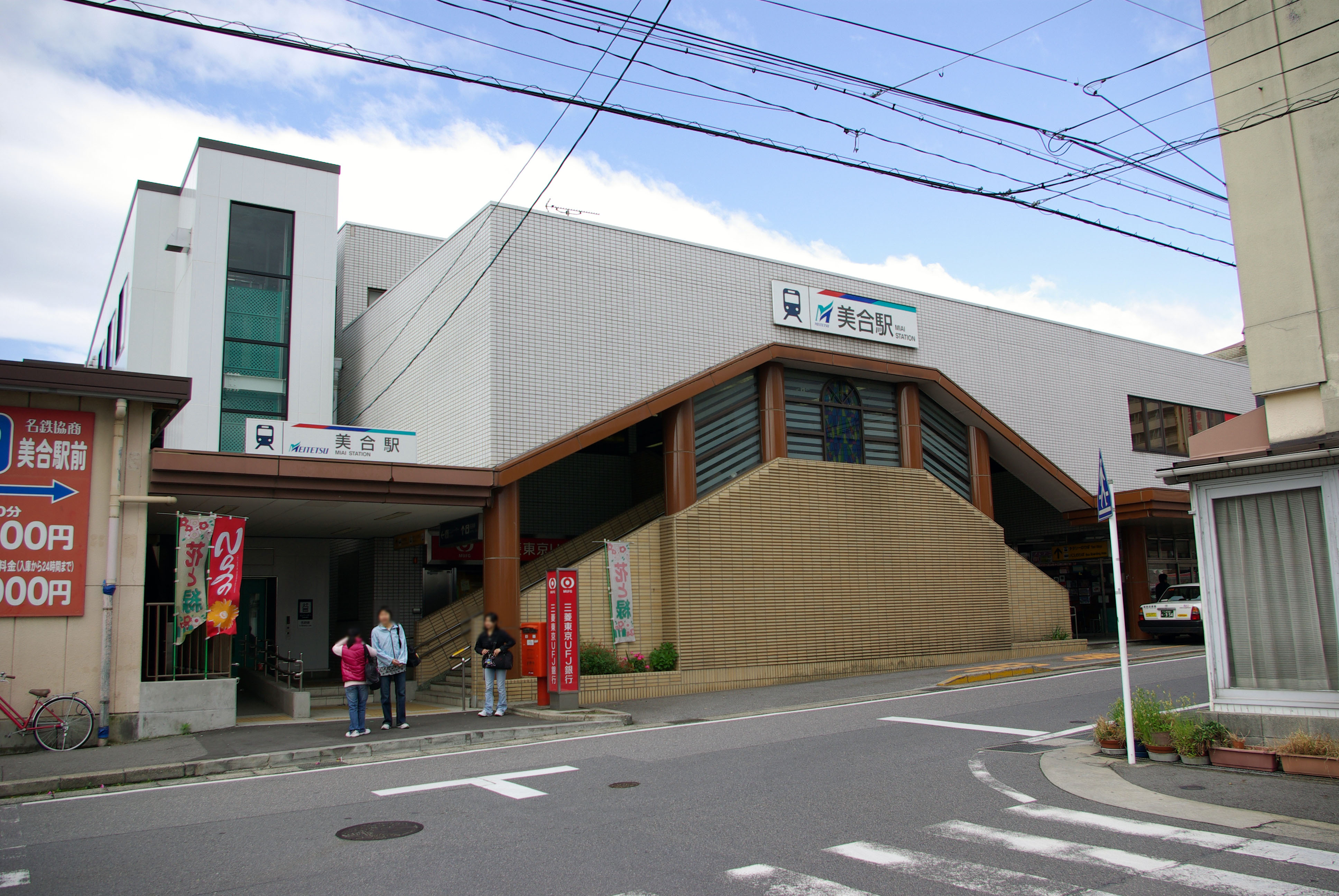
- Miai Station in April 2009

General information
- Location: Ichinokubo-1-64 Miaichō, Okazaki-shi, Aichi-ken 444-0802; Japan
- Coordinates: 34.9237°N 137.1964°E
- Operator: Meitetsu
- Line: ■ Meitetsu Nagoya Line
- Distance: 25.6 kilometers from Toyohashi
- Platforms: 2 island platforms

Other information
- Status: Staffed
- Station code: NH11
- Website: Official website

History
- Opened: 1 April 1926; 100 years ago

Passengers
- FY2017: 8,402 daily
Location
- Location within Aichi Prefecture Location within Japan

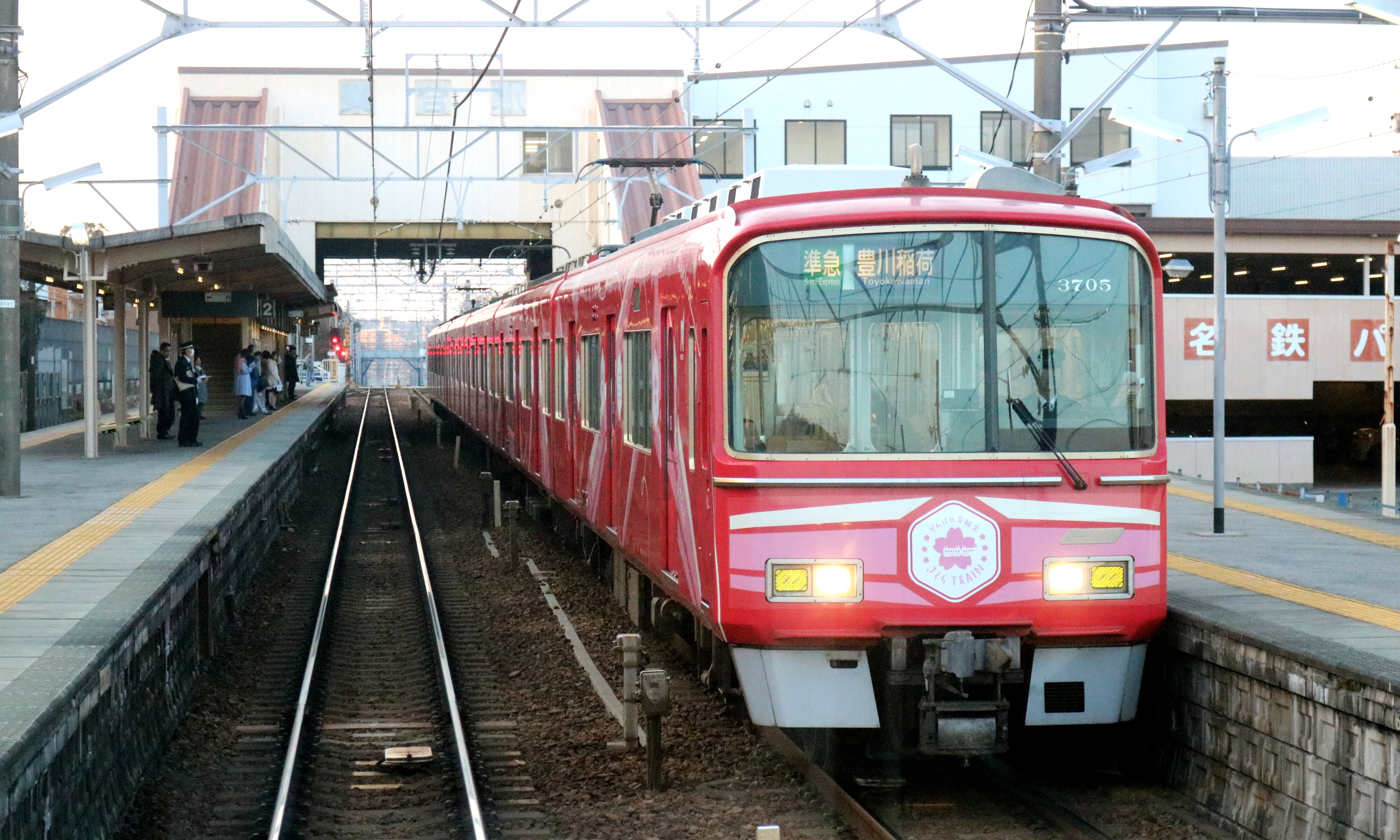
Platforms

Track layout

Miai Station (美合駅, Miai-eki) is a railway station in the city of Okazaki, Aichi, Japan, operated by Meitetsu.

== Lines ==
Miai Station is served by the Meitetsu Nagoya Main Line and is 25.6 kilometers from the terminus of the line at Toyohashi Station.

== Station layout ==
The station has two elevated island platforms connected by an elevated station building. The station has automated ticket machines, Manaca automated turnstiles and is staffed.

=== Platforms ===
| 1, 2 | ■ Nagoya Main Line | For Higashi Okazaki and Meitetsu Nagoya |
| 3, 4 | ■ Nagoya Main Line | For Toyohashi and Toyokawa-inari |

== Adjacent stations ==
| ← | Service | → |
Meitetsu Nagoya Main Line
| Motojuku | Express (急行) | Higashi Okazaki |
| Fujikawa | Semi Express (準急) | Otogawa |
| Fujikawa | Local (普通) | Otogawa |

== Station history ==
Miai Station was opened on 1 April 1926 as a station on the privately held Aichi Electric Railway. The Aichi Electric Railway was acquired by the Meitetsu Group on 1 August 1935. The station platforms and tracks were elevated in December 1987 and the station building was rebuilt at that time.

== Passenger statistics ==
In fiscal 2017, the station was used by an average of 8,402 passengers daily.

== Surrounding area ==
- Aichi College of Agriculture
- Okazaki Technical High School

== See also ==
- List of railway stations in Japan
