= Kisogawa-Zutsumi Station =

Railway station in Ichinomiya, Aichi Prefecture, Japan

Kisogawa-Zutsumi Station 木曽川堤駅

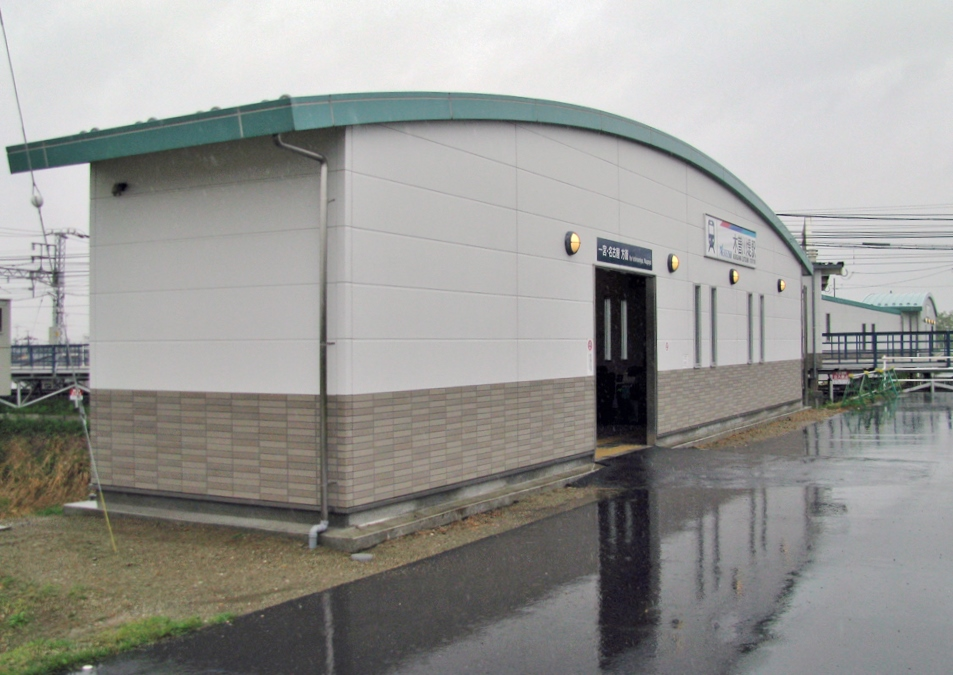
- Kisogawa-Zutsumi station building in April 2009

General information
- Location: Kitakata-cho, Ichinomiya-shi, Aichi-ken; Japan
- Coordinates: 35.3650°N 136.7707°E
- Operator: Meitetsu
- Line: Nagoya Main Line
- Distance: 93.9 kilometers from Toyohashi
- Platforms: 2 side platforms
- Tracks: 2

Construction
- Structure type: Embankment
- Accessible: Yes

Other information
- Status: Unstaffed
- Station code: NH55
- Website: Official website

History
- Opened: March 1, 1939

Passengers
- FY2008: 240 daily

Services
Preceding station	Meitetsu	Following station
Kuroda towards Toyohashi	Nagoya Main Line Local	Kasamatsu towards Meitetsu Gifu
Location
- Location within Aichi Prefecture Location within Japan

Kisogawa-Zutsumi Station (木曽川堤駅, Kisogawa-Zutsumi-eki) is a railway station in the city of Ichinomiya, Aichi Prefecture, Japan, operated by Meitetsu.

== Lines ==
Kisogawa-Zutsumi Station is served by the Meitetsu Nagoya Main Line and is 93.9 kilometers from the terminus of the line at Toyohashi Station.

== Station layout ==
The station has two opposed side platforms on an embankment connected to the station building by a footbridge and to each other by an underground passage. The station has automated ticket machines, Manaca automated turnstiles and is unattended.

=== Platforms ===
1	■ Meitetsu Nagoya Main Line	For Meitetsu-Gifu
2	■ Meitetsu Nagoya Main Line	For Meitetsu-Ichinomiya and Meitetsu-Nagoya

== Station history ==
Kisogawa-Zutsumi Station was opened on March 1, 1939.

== Passenger statistics ==
In fiscal 2013, the station was used by an average of 691 passengers daily.

== Surrounding area ==
- Kiso River

== See also ==
- List of railway stations in Japan
