= Fujimatsu Station =

Railway station in Kariya, Aichi Prefecture, Japan

Fujimatsu Station 富士松駅

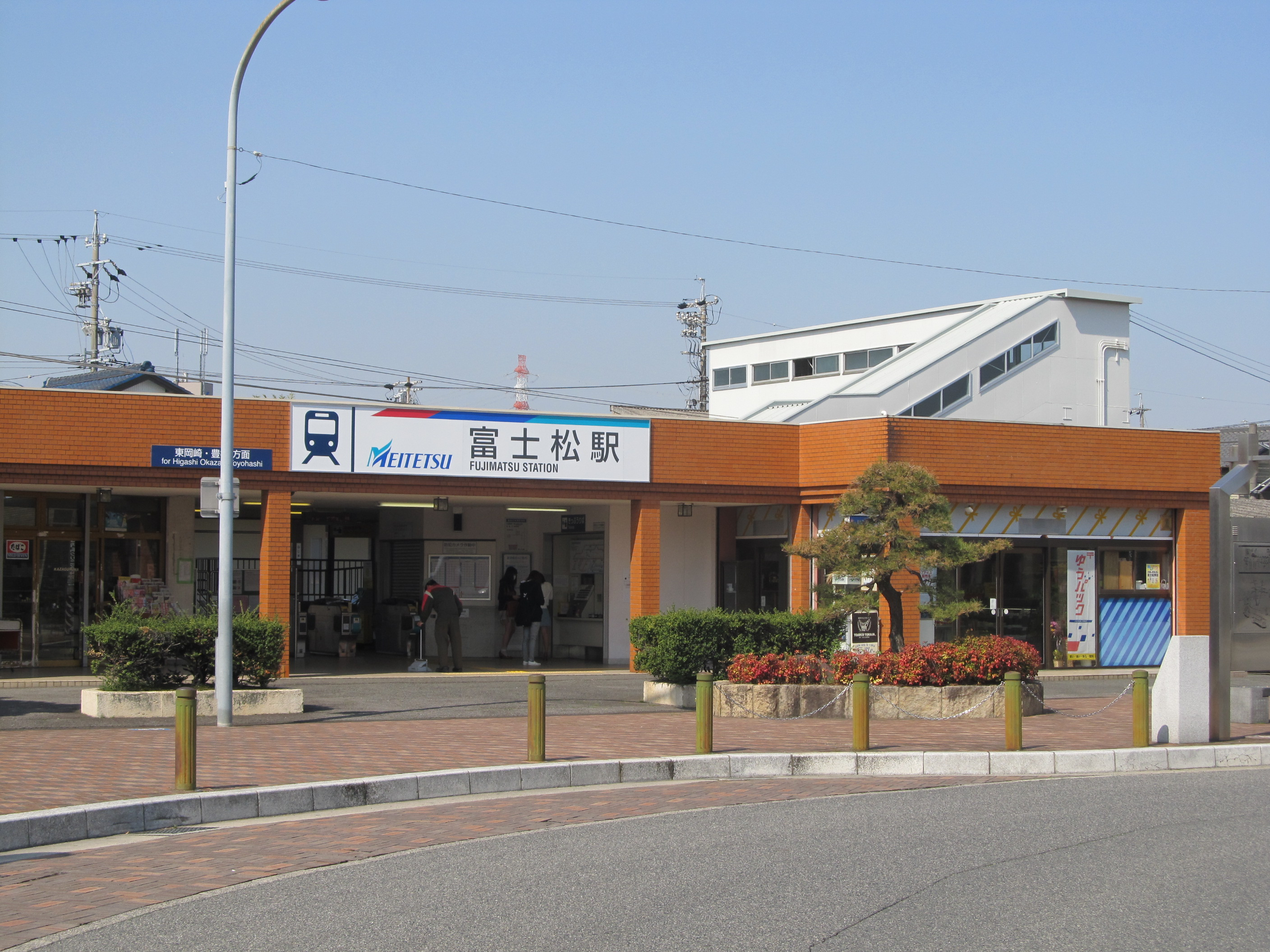
- Fujimatsu Station in March 2014

General information
- Location: 1-805 Imagawachō, Kariya-shi, Aichi-ken 448-0005; Japan
- Coordinates: 35.0296°N 137.0163°E
- Operator: Meitetsu
- Line: ■ Meitetsu Nagoya Main Line
- Distance: 46.6 kilometers from Toyohashi
- Platforms: 2 side platforms

Other information
- Status: Unstaffed
- Station code: NH21
- Website: Official website

History
- Opened: 1 April 1923; 103 years ago
- Former names: Imagawa (to 1952)

Passengers
- FY2017: 3271

Services
Preceding station	Meitetsu	Following station
Hitotsugi towards Toyohashi	Nagoya Main Line Local	Toyoake towards Meitetsu Gifu
Location
- Location within Aichi Prefecture Location within Japan

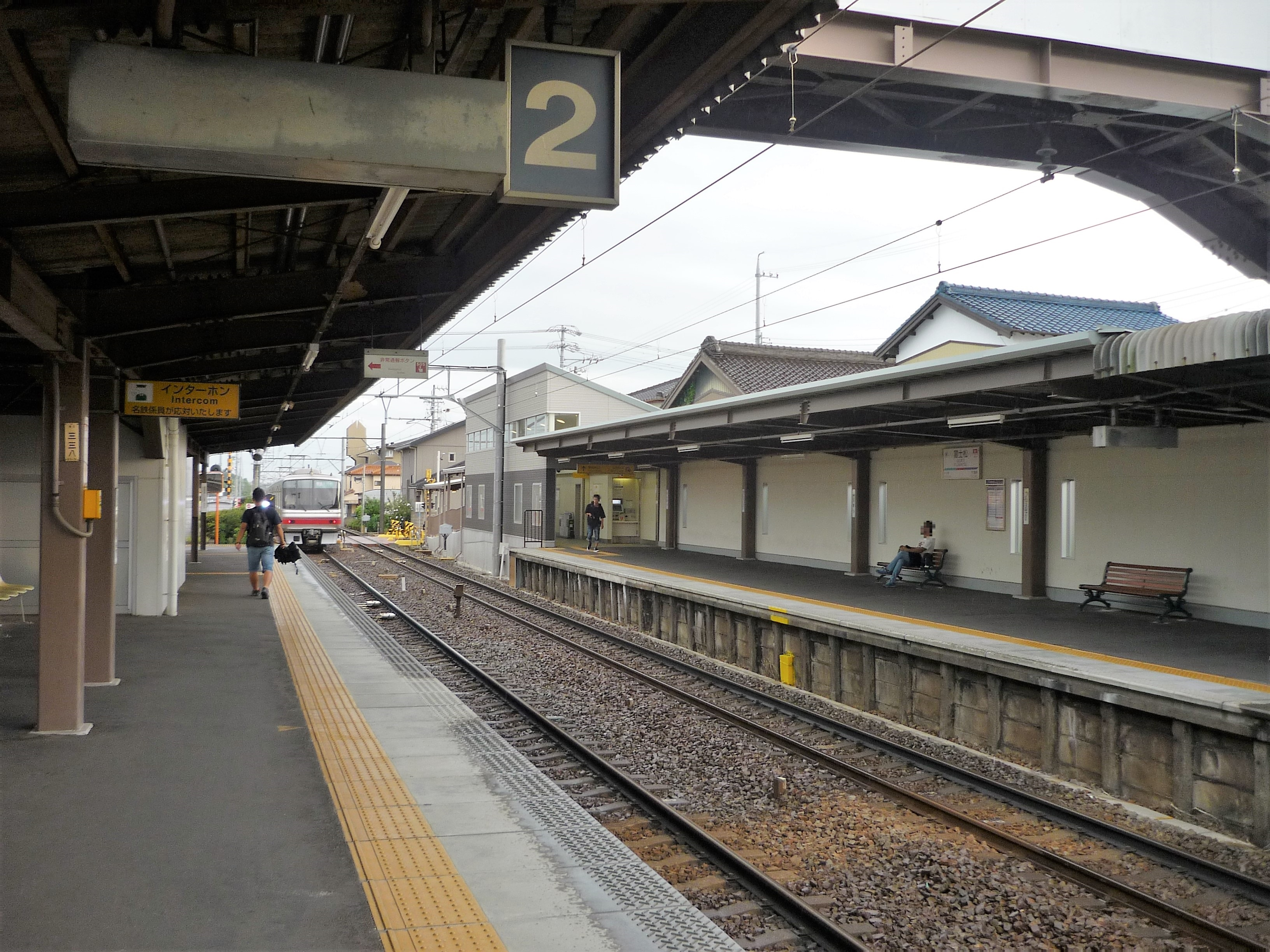
Platform

Fujimatsu Station (富士松駅, Fujimatsu-eki) is a railway station in the city of Kariya, Aichi Prefecture, Japan, operated by Meitetsu.

== Lines ==
Fujimatsu Station is served by the Meitetsu Nagoya Main Line, and is located 46.6 kilometers from the starting point of the line at Toyohashi.

== Station layout ==
The station has two opposed side platforms connected by a footbridge. The station has automatic turnstiles for the Tranpass system of magnetic fare cards, and is unattended.

=== Platforms ===
1	■ Nagoya Main Line	For Meitetsu Nagoya, Meitetsu Gifu and Inuyama
2	■ Nagoya Main Line	For Higashi Okazaki and Toyohashi

== Station history ==
Fujimatsu Station was opened on 1 April 1923 as Imagawa Station (今川駅, Imagawa-eki) on the Aichi Electric Railway. On 1 April 1935, the Aichi Electric Railway merged with the Nagoya Railroad (the forerunner of present-day Meitetsu). The station was renamed to its present name on 1 March 1952, taking the name of the village Fuji Matsumura. To celebrate the 100th anniversary of the founding of Meitetsu, the station dedicated a toilet in 1994.

== Passenger statistics ==
In fiscal 2017, the station was used by an average of 3271 passengers daily.

== Surrounding area ==
- Japan National Route 1
- Fujimatsu Junior High School

== See also ==
- List of railway stations in Japan
