= Yobitsugi Station =

Railway station in Nagoya, Japan

Coordinates: 35.1145°N 136.9303°E

Yobitsugi Station 呼続駅

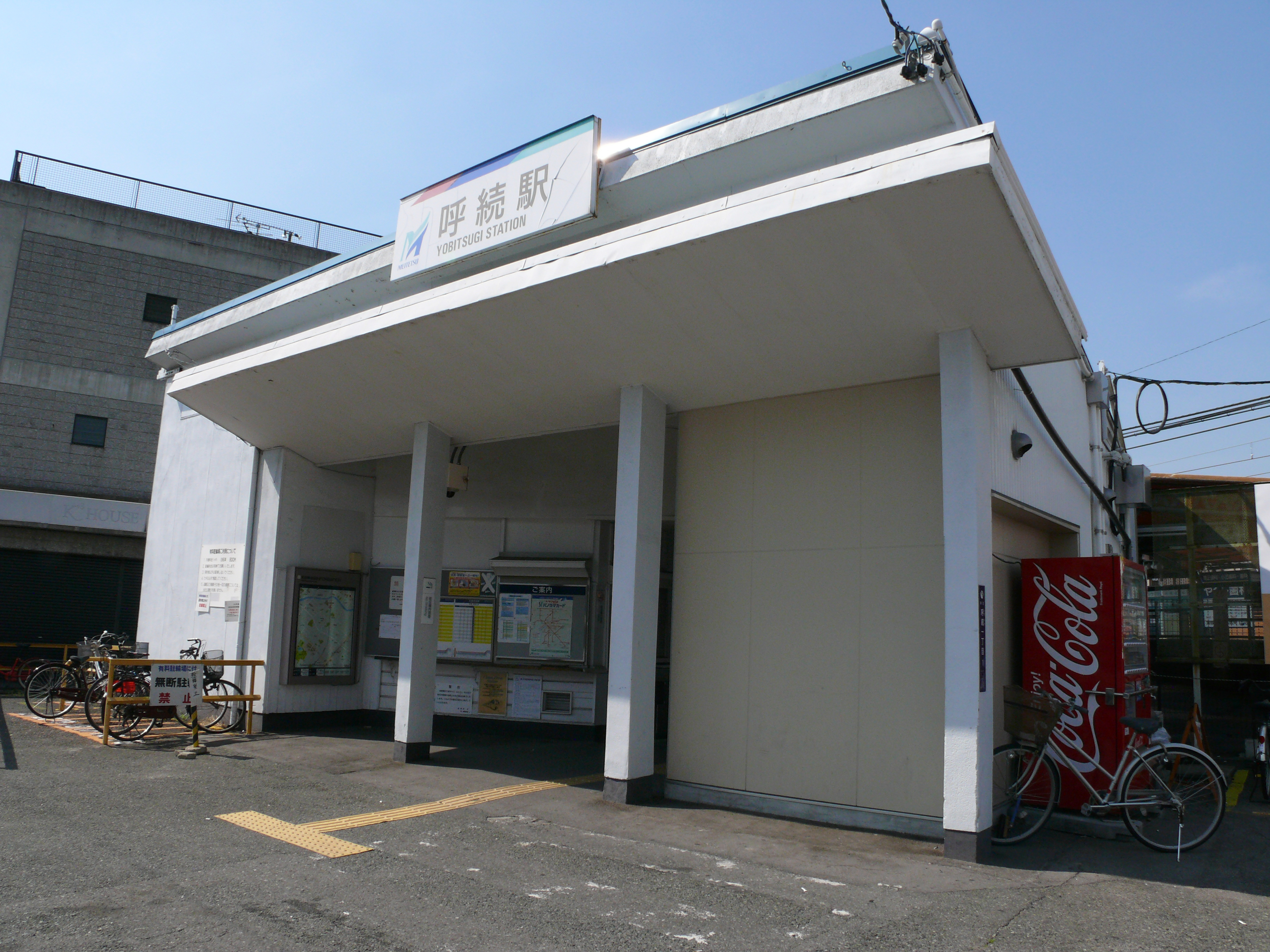
- Entrance

General information
- Location: Minami, Nagoya, Aichi （愛知県名古屋市南区呼続一丁目1番17号） Japan
- Operator: Nagoya Railroad
- Line: Meitetsu Nagoya Main Line
- Tracks: 2

Construction
- Structure type: At-grade

History
- Opened: 19 March 1917; 109 years ago

Passengers
- 2006: 305,606

Services
Preceding station	Meitetsu	Following station
Sakura towards Toyohashi	Nagoya Main Line Local	Horita towards Meitetsu Gifu
Location

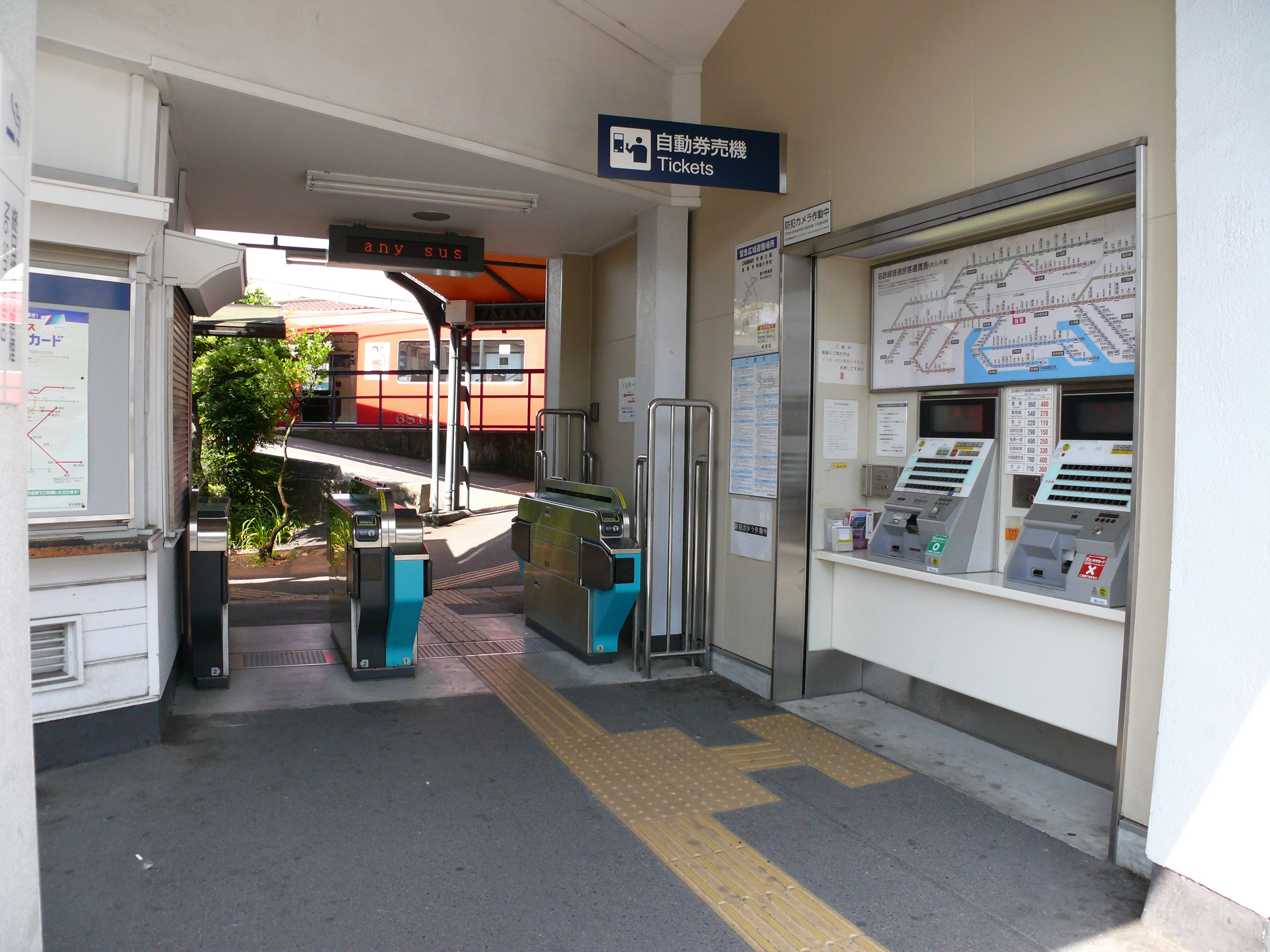
Ticket gate

Yobitsugi Station (呼続駅, Yobitsugi-eki) is a railway station on the Meitetsu Nagoya Main Line located in Minami-ku, Nagoya, Japan. It is located 59.9 kilometers from the junction of the Nagoya Main Line at Toyohashi.

== History ==
Yobitsugi Station was opened on 19 March 1917 as a station on the Aichi Electric Railway. On 1 April 1935, the Aichi Electric Railway merged with the Nagoya Railroad (the forerunner of present-day Meitetsu). The station has been unattended since September 2004.

== Lines ==
- Meitetsu
  - Meitetsu Nagoya Main Line

== Layout ==
Yobitsugi Station has two elevated opposed side platforms.

=== Platforms ===
1	■ Meitetsu Nagoya Main Line	For Meitetsu Nagoya, Meitetsu Gifu, and Inuyama
2	■ Meitetsu Nagoya Main Line	For Higashi Okazaki and Toyohashi
