= Iwato Station =

Railway station in Ichinomiya, Aichi Prefecture, Japan

Iwato Station 石刀駅

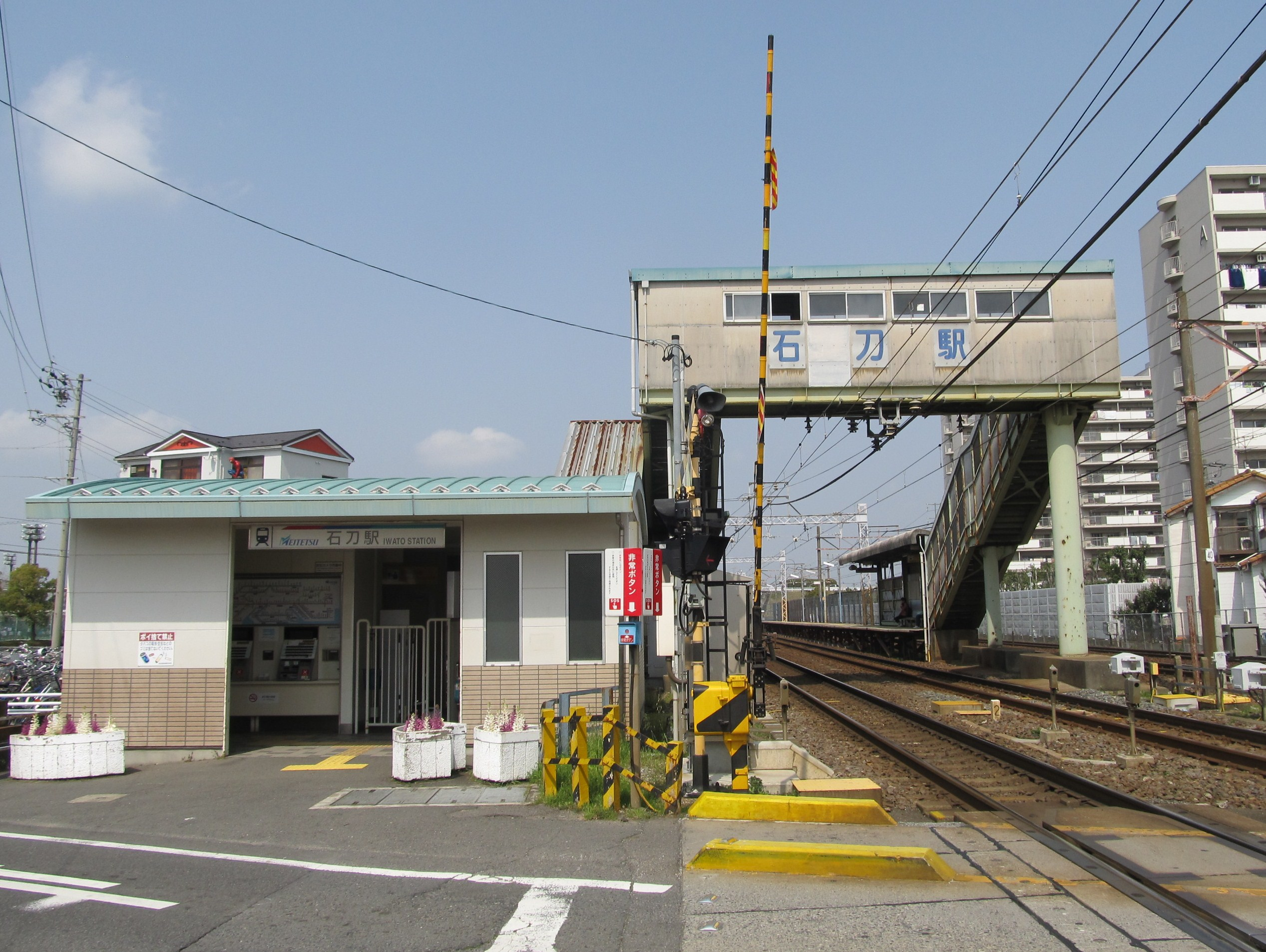
- Iwato Station

General information
- Location: Nishinagare Imaise-cho Umayose, Ichinomiya-shi, Aichi-ken 491-0051; Japan
- Coordinates: 35.3261°N 136.7855°E
- Operator: Meitetsu
- Line: ■ Meitetsu Nagoya Line
- Distance: 89.2 kilometers from Toyohashi
- Platforms: 2 side platforms
- Tracks: 2

Construction
- Structure type: At-grade
- Accessible: No

Other information
- Status: Unstaffed
- Station code: NH52
- Website: Official website

History
- Opened: April 29, 1935
- Former names: Maiso (1941)

Passengers
- FY2008: 1145 daily

Services
| Preceding station | Meitetsu | Following station |
|---|---|---|
| Imaise towards Toyohashi | Nagoya Main Line Local | Shin-Kisogawa towards Meitetsu Gifu |
Location
- Location within Aichi Prefecture Location within Japan

Iwato Station (石刀駅, Iwato-eki) is a railway station in the city of Ichinomiya, Aichi Prefecture, Japan, operated by Meitetsu.

== Lines ==
Iwato Station is served by the Meitetsu Nagoya Main Line and is 89.2 kilometers from the terminus of the line at Toyohashi Station.

== Station layout ==
The station has two opposed side platforms connected by a footbridge. The station has automated ticket machines, Manaca automated turnstiles and is unattended.

=== Platforms ===
| 1 | ■ Meitetsu Nagoya Main Line | For Meitetsu-Gifu |
| 2 | ■ Meitetsu Nagoya Main Line | For Meitetsu-Ichinomiya and Meitetsu-Nagoya |

== Station history ==
Iwato Station was opened on April 29, 1935 as Maiso Station (馬寄駅, Maiso-eki). It was renamed February 10, 1941. Operations were suspended in 1944, and the station was reopened on September 23, 1956.

== Passenger statistics ==
In fiscal 2013, the station was used by an average of 2708 passengers daily.

== Surrounding area ==
- Imaise Nishi Elementary School
- Iwato Jinja

== See also ==
- List of railway stations in Japan
