= Chajo Station =

Railway station in Gifu, Gifu Prefecture, Japan

Chajo Station 茶所駅

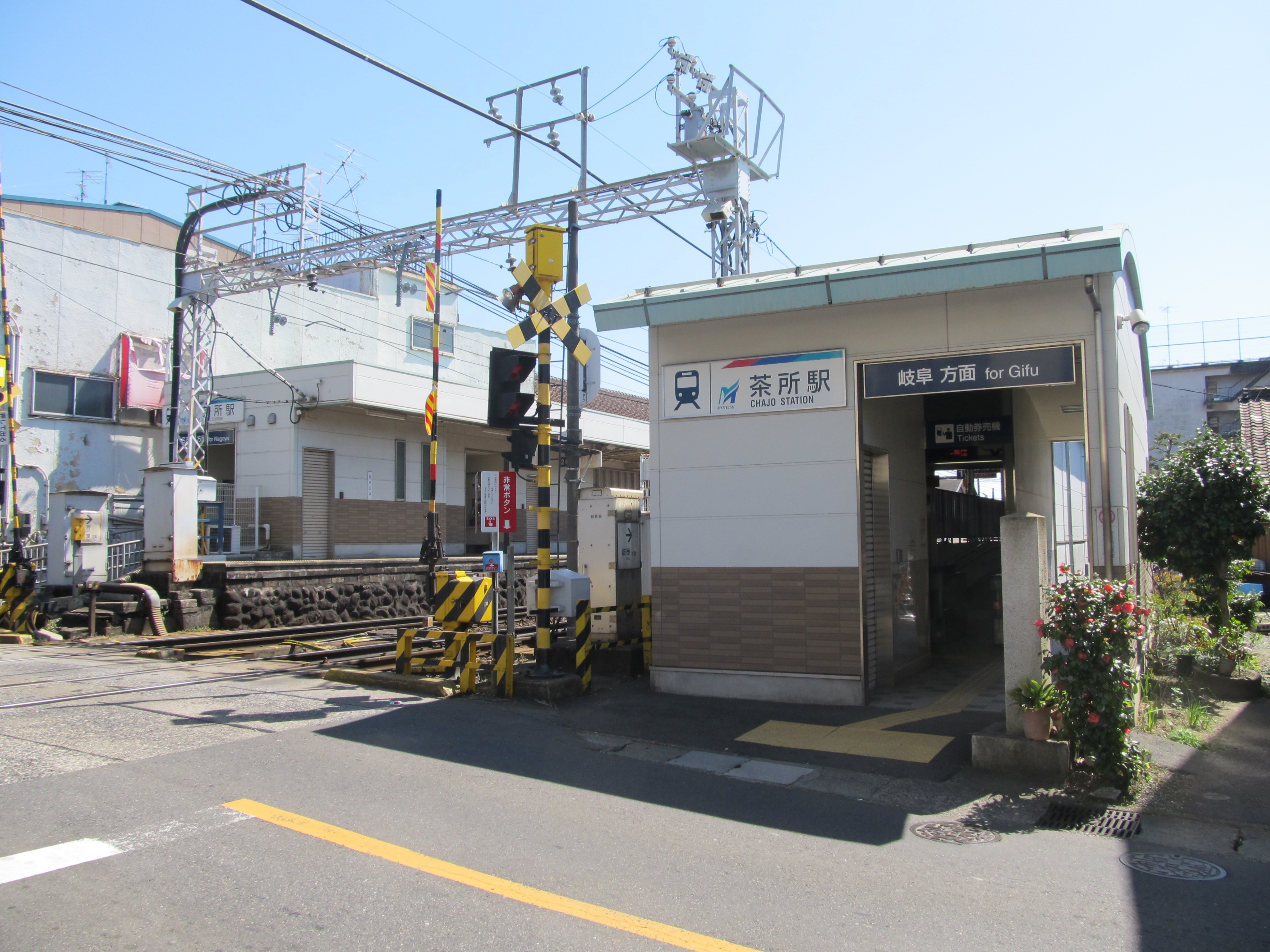
- Chajo Station in March 2015

General information
- Location: Kanohachiman-cho, Gifu-shi, Gifu-ken 500-8431; Japan
- Coordinates: 35.40225°N 136.768915°E
- Operator: Meitetsu
- Line: ■ Meitetsu Nagoya Main Line
- Distance: 98.3 km from Toyohashi
- Platforms: 2 side platforms

Other information
- Status: Unstaffed
- Station code: NH58
- Website: Official website

History
- Opened: June 2, 1914
- Former names: Kamikawate (to 1914)

Passengers
- FY2013: 535

Services
Preceding station	Meitetsu	Following station
Ginan towards Toyohashi	Nagoya Main Line Local	Kanō towards Meitetsu Gifu
Location
- Location within Japan

Chajo Station (茶所駅, Chajo-eki) is a railway station in the city of Gifu, Gifu Prefecture, Japan, operated by the private railway operator Meitetsu. It has the station number "NH58".

== Lines ==
Chajo Station is served by the Nagoya Main Line, and is located 98.3 kilometers from the terminus of the line at Toyohashi.

== Station layout ==
Track layout

Chajo Station has two ground-level opposed side platforms connected by a level crossing. The station is unstaffed.

=== Platforms ===
1	■ Meitetsu Nagoya Main Line	For Meitetsu-Gifu
2	■ Meitetsu Nagoya Main Line	For Meitetsu-Ichinomiya, Meitetsu-Nagoya, and Toyohashi

== History ==
Chajo Station opened on June 2, 1914, as Kamikawate Station (上川手). It was renamed Chajo Station on December 14 of the same year.

== Surrounding area ==
- National Route 21

== See also ==
- List of railway stations in Japan
