= Moto Kasadera Station =

Railway station in Nagoya, Japan

Coordinates: 35.0993°N 136.9336°E

Moto Kasadera Station 本笠寺駅

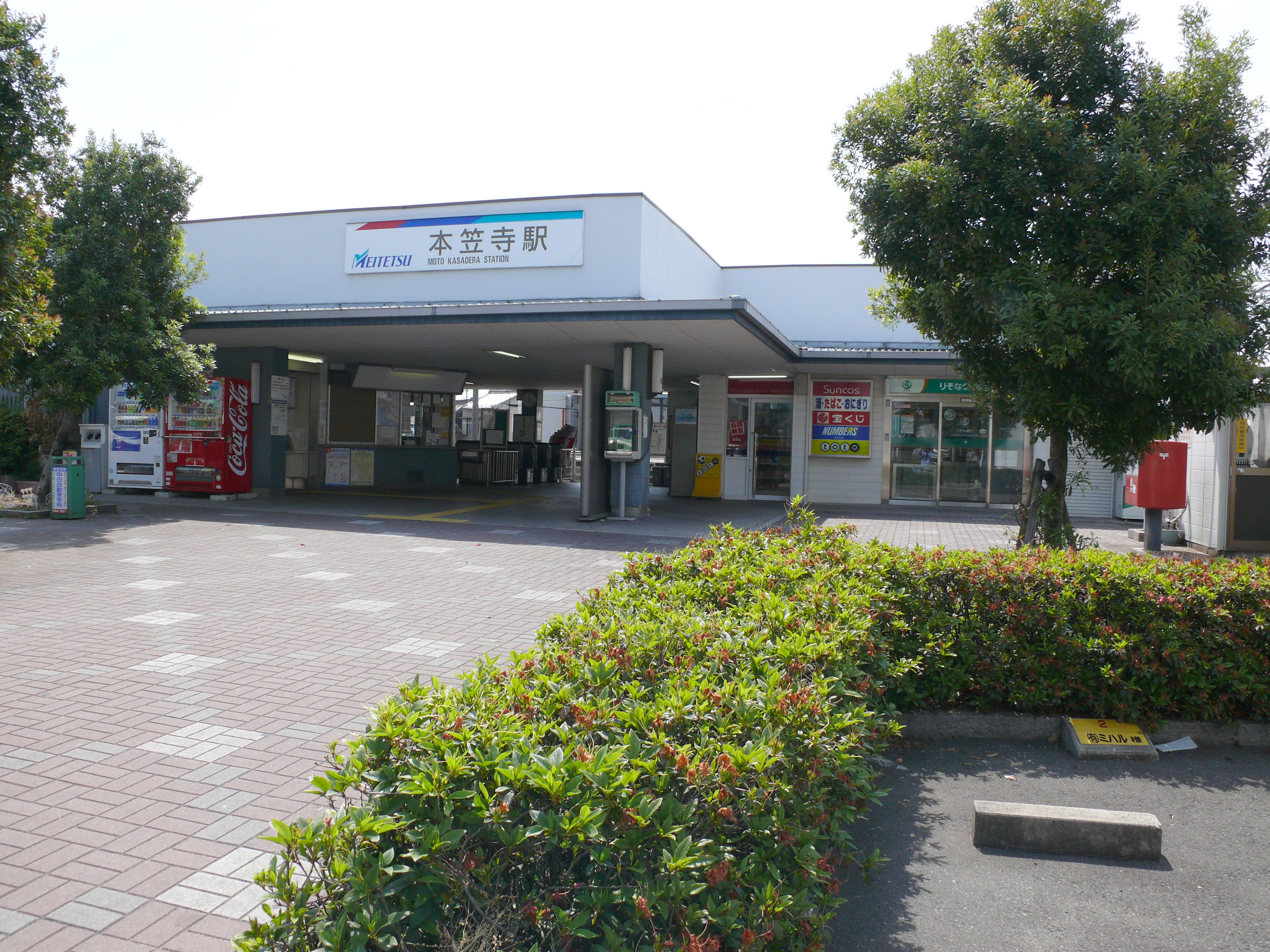
- A view of the station

General information
- Location: Maehama-dori 7-3, Minami, Nagoya, Aichi （愛知県名古屋市南区前浜通七丁目3） Japan
- Operator: Nagoya Railroad
- Line: Meitetsu Nagoya Main Line
- Platforms: 2 island platforms
- Tracks: 4

Construction
- Structure type: Embankment
- Cycle facilities: Yes
- Accessible: Yes

History
- Opened: 19 March 1917; 109 years ago
- Former names: Kasadera (until 1943)

Passengers
- 2008: 2142 daily

Services
Preceding station	Meitetsu	Following station
Moto Hoshizaki towards Toyohashi	Nagoya Main Line Local	Sakura towards Meitetsu Gifu
Location

Moto Kasadera Station (本笠寺駅, Moto Kasadera-eki) is a railway station on the Meitetsu Nagoya Main Line located in Minami-ku, Nagoya, Japan. It is located 58.2 kilometers from the junction of the Nagoya Main Line at Toyohashi.

== History ==
Moto Kasadera Station was opened on 19 March 1917 as Kasadera Station (笠寺駅, Kasadera-eki) on the Aichi Electric Railway. On 1 April 1935, the Aichi Electric Railway merged with the Nagoya Railroad (the forerunner of present-day Meitetsu). On 1 June 1943, with the opening of Kasadera on the Japanese Government Railways Tōkaidō Main Line, the station name was changed to its present name.

== Lines ==
- Meitetsu
  - Meitetsu Nagoya Main Line

== Layout ==
Moto Kasadera Station has two island platforms.

=== Platforms ===
1	■ Meitetsu Nagoya Main Line	For Meitetsu Nagoya, Meitetsu Gifu and Inuyama
2	■ Meitetsu Nagoya Main Line	For Meitetsu Nagoya, Meitetsu Gifu and Inuyama
3	■ Meitetsu Nagoya Main Line	For Higashi Okazaki and Toyohashi
4	■ Meitetsu Nagoya Main Line	For Higashi Okazaki and Toyohashi
