= Meitetsu Nagoya Main Line =

Railway line in Aichi and Gifu prefectures, Japan

Nagoya Main Line

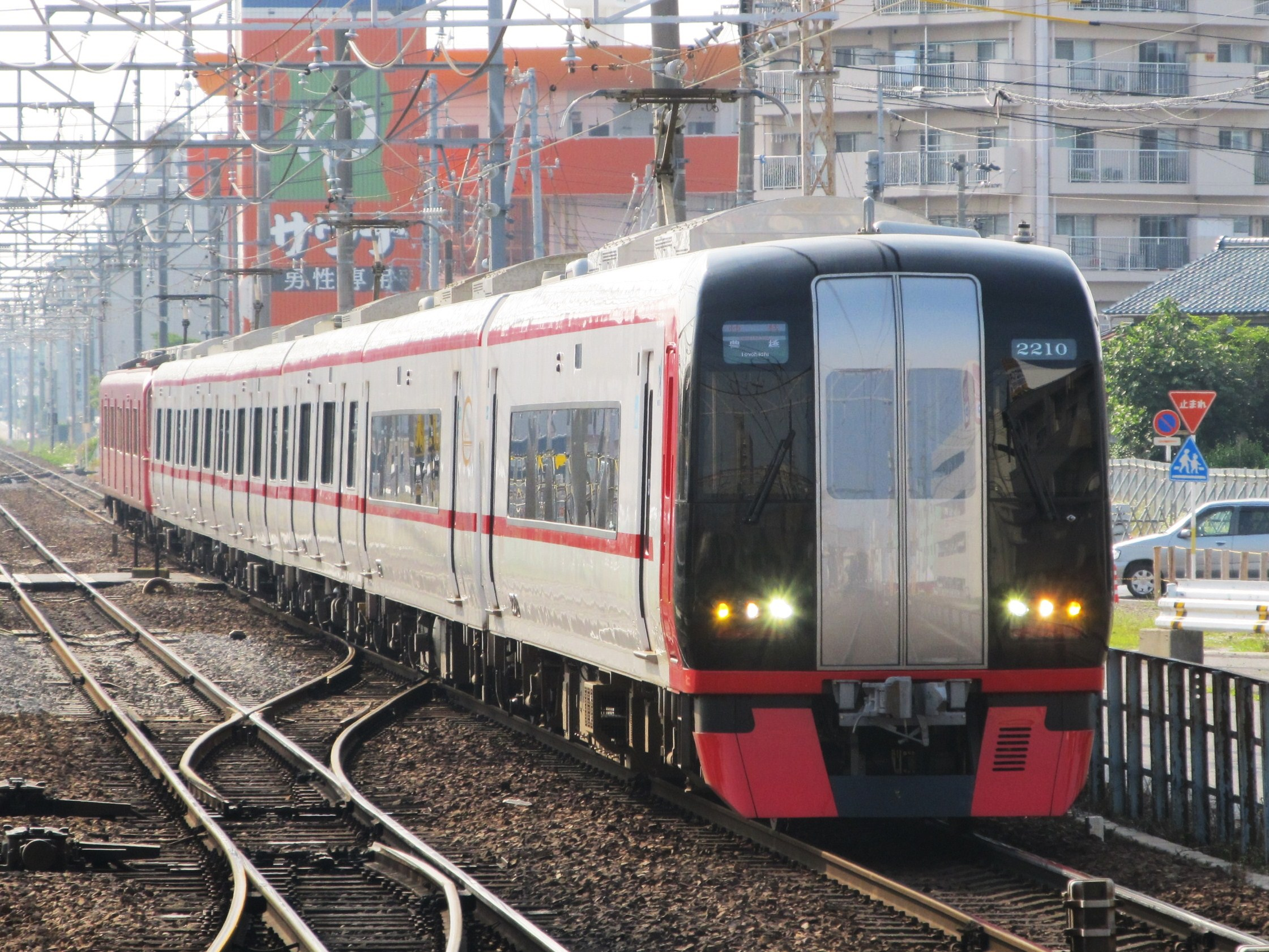
- A Meitetsu 2200 series bound for Toyohashi

Overview
- Other name: Meitetsu Main Line
- Native name: 名古屋本線
- Status: In operation
- Owner: Nagoya Railroad Co., Ltd.
- Line number: NH
- Locale: Aichi Prefecture; Gifu Prefecture
- Termini: Toyohashi; Meitetsu Gifu
- Connecting lines: See stations list
- Former connections: See stations list
- Stations: 60

Service
- Type: Heavy rail
- System: Meitetsu
- Operator(s): Nagoya Railroad Co., Ltd.
- Rolling stock: Meitetsu 2000 series; Meitetsu 2200 series; Meitetsu 1700 series; Meitetsu 1200 series; Meitetsu 1800 series; Meitetsu 3500 series; Meitetsu 3700 series; Meitetsu 3100 series; Meitetsu 3300 series; Meitetsu 3150 series; Meitetsu 3300 series; Meitetsu 4000 series; Meitetsu 5700 series; Meitetsu 6000 series; Meitetsu 6500 series; Meitetsu 6800 series; Meitetsu 5000 series (2008); Meitetsu 9500 series

History
- Opened: 23 September 1914; 112 years ago
- Last extension: 1 September 1944
- Completed: 18 April 1948 (named) (Note: As the railway line was officially named as the Meitetsu Nagoya Main Line on this date, this is set as the completion date. However, due to the historical background of the line, parts of the line has been opened earlier than this date.)

Technical
- Line length: 99.8 km (62.0 mi)
- Num of tracks: Quadruple (Jingū-mae - Kanayama); Double (Most of the line); Single (Ina - Toyohashi)
- Track gauge: 1,067 mm (3 ft 6 in)
- Electrification: 1,500 V Overhead catenary

The Nagoya Main Line (名古屋本線, Nagoya Honsen) is a Japanese railway line operated by the private railway operator Nagoya Railroad (Meitetsu), connecting Toyohashi Station in Toyohashi with Meitetsu Gifu Station in Gifu. The line is also called the Meitetsu Main Line (名鉄本線, Meitetsu Honsen).

The line was formed through mergers of multiple local railway operators and segments of their railway lines. These lines were connected into two separate lines, one from Jingū-mae to Toyohashi, and the other from Meitetsu Gifu to Oshikirichō, each given the name "Eastern Line" and "Western Line" in 1935. The Aichi Electric Railway constructed the eastern part from 1917 to 1927. The western part was formed out of lines operated by the Nagoya Electric Railway, the Mino Electric Railroad, and the Bisai Railway. The lines ran by each operator were eventually merged into a single line by several mergers. After the formation of Meitetsu in 1935, efforts to connect the two lines were made, which was completed in 1944. The difference in voltage between the two segments were corrected by 1948, and the two segments were renamed to the Meitetsu Nagoya Main Line on the same date. Since then, Meitetsu introduced new rolling stock and removed sharp curves to compete with the Tōkaidō Main Line operated by the Japanese National Railways, and its successor Central Japan Railway Company.

Due to historical reasons, the line shares its track between Hirai Junction and Toyohashi Station with the JR Iida Line. This limits the number of trains passing through the section. Local trains terminate at Ina Station instead of Toyohashi, the terminus.

== History ==
The Nagoya Main Line was formed through mergers of multiple local railway operators and segments of their railway lines. The line prior to being connected and treated as a single railway line was divided between eastern and western sections. These two segments were later named the Eastern Line (東部線, Tōbu-sen), and the Western Line (西部線, Seibu-sen) in 1935.

=== Eastern Line ===
The Eastern Line was constructed by a single railway company, the Aichi Electric Railway. As the Tōkaidō Main Line constructed by the Ministry of Railways by 1889 took a different route from the Tōkaidō in the Aichi Prefecture segment, the company built the line along the Tōkaidō instead. The Eastern Line was originally named the Arimatsu Line (有松線) when it was opened between Jingū-mae and Arimatsu-ura (now named Arimatsu) in 1917. This line renamed to Toyohashi Line (豊橋線) upon extending to Toyohashi by 1927. The line was electrified at 1,500 V, with advanced infrastructures at the time. To reach Toyohashi from Ina Station, the company only built a single track, paralleling the Toyokawa Railway's track. When the Aichi Electric Railway merged with the Meigi Railroad in 1935, the line was renamed to the Eastern Line.

=== Western Line ===
The Western Line was made up of segments from three different railway lines, each by different operators. The first railway operator to construct a line was the Nagoya Electric Railway. The company opened the part between Sukaguchi and Biwajimabashi in 1914. Later in the same year, the Mino Electric Railroad opened a line between Kasamatsu and Hiroe, located near the current Kanō Station. By the end of the year, this line, named the Kasamatsu Line (笠松線), extended to Shin Gifu (current Meitetsu Gifu). In 1921, the Nagoya Electric Railway established the Nagoya Railroad, transferred the tramway network to the city of Nagoya, and the heavy rail network to the established company, and disbanded. The Bisai Railway operated the line between Kōnomiya and Shin Ichinomiya (now Meitetsu Ichinomiya) for a year prior to being transferred to the Nagoya Railroad in 1925. The Nagoya Railroad continued to extend their line, connecting Shin Ichinomiya and Oshikirichō, the western terminal of Nagoya at the time by April 1928. On 20 August 1930, the company merged with the Mino Electric Railroad to form the Meigi Railway. Shin Ichinomiya and Kasamatsu were connected in 1935. Following this extension, Shin Gifu (current Meitetsu Gifu) and Oshikirichō were connected with a single line. Because the line was formerly three separate railways, the line goes through central areas of the passing municipalities compared to the competing Tōkaidō Main Line, and the segment has frequent curves.

=== Merger and post-merger ===
Until 1935, mergers involving the Aichi Electric Railway were brought up multiple times since it was established, but none took place. Around the end of the Taishō era, competition against the two private operators Meigi Railway and the Aichi Electric Railway, which were the tram network operated by the city of Nagoya and the Japan Governmental Railways (JGR), escalated. Added with the Great Depression, these two companies were not able to keep themselves functional with the population of Nagoya at the time. Eventually, the two companies, with the help of the mayor of Nagoya, merged into the current Nagoya Railroad (Meitetsu). Despite this, the two major lines of the two companies were still unconnected, and had different voltages, as the Western Line used 600 V electrification while the east used 1,500 V. Coinciding with the relocation of the JGR's Nagoya Station, Meitetsu extended the western section from Biwajimabashi to Meitetsu Nagoya, closing the former line between Biwajimabashi and Oshikirichō. The Eastern Line was originally planned to run right below the roads of Nagoya, although this did not happen due to opposition from the city. Meitetsu eventually bought the former Nagoya Station's land from the JGR and constructed the line through the land, later building the Meitetsu Department Store and a bus terminal above it. While steel supply was limited by the government due to World War II, The Eastern Line reached Meitetsu Nagoya on 1 September 1944. Upon the two lines being connected, the section from Kanayama to Meitetsu Gifu was named Meigi Line (名岐線), and the section from Kanayama to Toyohashi was named Toyohashi Line (豊橋線). Despite technically being a single line, service through these two named lines were not possible due to differing voltage. On 16 May 1948, the Meigi Line's voltage was raised to 1,500 V, and both lines were renamed into the Nagoya Main Line.

The Tōkaidō Main Line was electrified to Maibara Station in 1955, and electric multiple units started operating in the paralleling segment of the line between Toyohashi and Ōgaki. Meitetsu introduced new rolling stocks such as the 5000 series, reduced sharp curves, and increased the number of services providing through service to other lines. In the timetable revision of 1959, the maximum speed of the line was increased to 105 km/h (65 mph) from 100 km/h (62 mph). The 5500 series was introduced to the line at the time of the same timetable revision, which was the first train equipped with air conditioners that didn't require an additional fee. Meitetsu adopted their own automatic train stop (ATS) system in 1965. The tracks between Jingū-mae and Kanayama were quadrupled in 1990. The operating speed for trains on the line was increased to 120 km/h (75 mph) in the same year. Works to elevate parts of the line by viaducts have been taking place, with the area around Mikawa Chiryū Station expected to be elevated by 2031. The area around Narumi Station was elevated in 2006.

== Service patterns ==
Seven types of services run on the line. The names are as follows:

- Local (普通, Futsū)
- Semi Express (準急, Junkyū)
- Express (急行, Kyūkō)
- Rapid Express (快速急行, Kaisoku Kyūkō)
- Limited Express (特急, Tokkyū)
- Rapid Limited Express (快速特急, Kaisoku Tokkyū)
- μSKY Limited Express (ミュースカイ, Myū Sukai)

Because of the sheer amount of stopping patterns, trains which stops on stations that aren't usually stopped by the service is excluded from the list. Additionally, services that change service time upon arriving at a certain station are also ignored.

=== Legend ===
- ●: All trains stop
- |: Trains pass
- ▲▼: Through service, all or some trains continue off the line

Station	Local	Semi-Express	Express	Rapid Express	Limited Express	Rapid Limited Express	Limited Express μSKY
Toyohashi			●		●	●	
Ina	●	●	●		|	|	
Odabuchi	●	|	|		|	|	
Kō	●	●	▲		●	|	
Goyu	●	|	|		|	|	
Meiden Akasaka	●	|	|		|	|	
Meiden Nagasawa	●	|	|		|	|	
Motojuku	●	●	●		|	|	
Meiden Yamanaka	●	|	|		|	|	
Fujikawa	●	●	|		|	|	
Miai	●	●	●		|	|	
Otogawa	●	●	|		|	|	
Higashi Okazaki	●	●	●		●	●	
Okazakikōen-mae	●	|	|		|	|	
Yahagibashi	●	●	|		|	|	
Utō	●	|	|		|	|	
Shin Anjō	●	●	▲		●	|	
Ushida	●	|	|		|	|	
Chiryū	●	●	●		●	●	
Hitotsugi	●	|	|		|	|	
Fujimatsu	●	|	|		|	|	
Toyoake	●	●	|		|	|	
Zengo	●	●	●		|	|	
Chūkyō-keibajō-mae	●	●	|		|	|	
Arimatsu	●	●	|		|	|	
Sakyōyama	●	|	|		|	|	
Narumi	●	●	●		|	|	
Moto Hoshizaki	●	|	|		|	|	
Moto Kasadera	●	|	|		|	|	
Sakura	●	|	|		|	|	
Yobitsugi	●	|	|		|	|	
Horita	●	●	●		|	|	
Jingū-mae	▲	▲	▲	▲	▲	▲	▲
Kanayama	●	●	●	●	●	●	●
Sannō	●	|	|	|	|	|	|
Meitetsu Nagoya	●	●	●	●	●	●	●
Sakō	●	●	●	|	|	|	|
Higashi-Biwajima	●	|	|	|	|	|	|
Nishi-Biwajima	●	|	|	|	|	|	|
Futatsu-iri	●	●	|	|	|	|	|
Shinkawabashi	●	|	|	|	|	|	|
Sukaguchi	●	●	●	●	|	|	|
Marunouchi	●	|	|	|	|	|	|
Shin-Kiyosu	●	●	●	●	|	|	|
Ōsato	●	●	|	|	|	|	|
Okuda	●	|	|	|	|	|	|
Kōnomiya	●	●	●	●	●	●	●
Shima-Ujinaga	●	|	|	|	|	|	|
Myōkōji	●	|	|	|	|	|	|
Meitetsu Ichinomiya	●	●	●	●	●	●	●
Imaise	●	|	|	|	|	|	|
Iwato	●	|	|	|	|	|	|
Shin Kisogawa	●	●	●	●	●	●	|
Kuroda	●	|	|	|	|	|	|
Kisogawa-Zutsumi	●	|	|	|	|	|	|
Kasamatsu	●	●	●	●	●	●	|
Ginan	●	|	|	|	|	|	|
Chajo	●	|	|	|	|	|	|
Kanō	●	|	|	|	|	|	|
Meitetsu Gifu	●	●	●	●	●	●	●

== Infrastructure ==
Diagram of the Hirai Junction

Most of the Meitetsu Nagoya Main Line is double-tracked, although the section between Jingū-mae and Kanayama are quadrupled. However, a segment of the track inside Meitetsu Gifu is single-tracked. This severely restricts the operations of trains entering and exiting the station. The section of the line between Ina and Toyohashi shares tracks with the Iida Line, so the Nagoya Main Line is single-tracked from Toyohashi to the Hirai Junction, where the Iida Line branches north.

=== Station list ===
No.	Station name		Transfers	Opened	Distance from Toyohashi (km)	Location	
No.	English	Japanese	Transfers	Opened	Distance from Toyohashi (km)	Ward or City	Prefecture
NH01	Toyohashi	豊橋	Tokaido Shinkansen; Tōkaidō Main Line (CA42); Iida Line (CD00); ■ Atsumi Line (Shin-Toyohashi: 1); ■ Azumada Main Line (Ekimae: 1)	1 June 1927	0.0	Toyohashi	Aichi
NH02	Ina	伊奈		1 June 1927	5.0	Toyokawa	Aichi
NH03	Odabuchi	小田渕		14 January 1934	6.6	Toyokawa	Aichi
NH04	Kō	国府	Toyokawa Line (NH04)	1 April 1926	9.6	Toyokawa	Aichi
NH05	Goyu	御油		1 April 1926	10.7	Toyokawa	Aichi
NH06	Meiden Akasaka	名電赤坂		1 April 1926	12.5	Toyokawa	Aichi
NH07	Meiden Nagasawa	名電長沢		1 April 1926	15.0	Toyokawa	Aichi
NH08	Motojuku	本宿		1 April 1926	18.7	Okazaki	Aichi
NH09	Meiden Yamanaka	名電山中		1 April 1926	20.4	Okazaki	Aichi
NH10	Fujikawa	藤川		1 April 1926	23.1	Okazaki	Aichi
NH11	Miai	美合		1 April 1926	25.6	Okazaki	Aichi
NH12	Otogawa	男川		1 April 1926	27.6	Okazaki	Aichi
NH13	Higashi Okazaki	東岡崎		8 August 1923	29.8	Okazaki	Aichi
NH14	Okazakikōen-mae	岡崎公園前	Aichi Loop Line (Naka-Okazaki: 03)	1 June 1923	31.1	Okazaki	Aichi
NH15	Yahagibashi	矢作橋		1 June 1923	32.5	Okazaki	Aichi
NH16	Utō	宇頭		1 June 1923	34.8	Okazaki	Aichi
NH17	Shin Anjō	新安城	Nishio Line (NH17)	1 June 1923	38.3	Anjō	Aichi
NH18	Ushida	牛田		1 June 1923	40.9	Chiryū	Aichi
NH19	Chiryū	知立	Mikawa Line (NH19)	1 April 1959	43.1	Chiryū	Aichi
NH20	Hitotsugi	一ツ木		1 April 1923	44.6	Kariya	Aichi
NH21	Fujimatsu	富士松		1 April 1923	46.6	Kariya	Aichi
NH22	Toyoake	豊明		1 April 1923	48.1	Toyoake	Aichi
NH23	Zengo	前後		1 April 1923	49.8	Toyoake	Aichi
NH24	Chūkyō-keibajō-mae	中京競馬場前		15 July 1953	51.4	Midori-ku, Nagoya	Aichi
NH25	Arimatsu	有松		8 May 1917	52.7	Midori-ku, Nagoya	Aichi
NH26	Sakyōyama	左京山		15 November 1942	53.8	Midori-ku, Nagoya	Aichi
NH27	Narumi	鳴海		8 May 1917	55.1	Midori-ku, Nagoya	Aichi
NH28	Moto Hoshizaki	本星崎		8 May 1917	56.7	Minami-ku, Nagoya	Aichi
NH29	Moto Kasadera	本笠寺		19 March 1917	58.2	Minami-ku, Nagoya	Aichi
NH30	Sakura	桜		19 March 1917	58.9	Minami-ku, Nagoya	Aichi
NH31	Yobitsugi	呼続		19 March 1917	59.9	Minami-ku, Nagoya	Aichi
NH32	Horita	堀田		15 April 1928	61.1	Mizuho-ku, Nagoya	Aichi
NH33	Jingū-mae	神宮前	Tokoname Line (NH33)	31 August 1913	62.2	Atsuta-ku, Nagoya	Aichi
NH34	Kanayama	金山	Tōkaidō Main Line (CA66); Chūō Main Line (CF01); Meijō Line (M01); Meikō Line (E01)	1 September 1944	64.4	Naka-ku, Nagoya	Aichi
NH35	Sannō	山王		1 September 1944	66.0	Nakagawa-ku, Nagoya	Aichi
NH36	Meitetsu Nagoya	名鉄名古屋	Nagoya: Tokaido Shinkansen Tōkaidō Main Line (CA68) Chūō Main Line (CF00) Kansai Main Line (CJ00) Higashiyama Line (H08) Sakura-dōri Line (S02) Aonami Line (AN01): Nagoya Line (Kintetsu Nagoya: E01)	12 August 1941	68.0	Nakamura-ku, Nagoya	Aichi
NH37	Sakō	栄生		12 August 1941	69.9	Nishi-ku, Nagoya	Aichi
NH38	Higashi-Biwajima	東枇杷島	Inuyama Line (NH38)	12 August 1941	70.7	Nishi-ku, Nagoya	Aichi
NH39	Nishi-Biwajima	西枇杷島		23 January 1914	71.6	Kiyosu	Aichi
NH40	Futatsu-iri	二ツ杁		1 February 1942	72.2	Kiyosu	Aichi
NH41	Shinkawabashi	新川橋		23 January 1914	72.8	Kiyosu	Aichi
NH42	Sukaguchi	須ヶ口	Tsushima Line (NH42)	23 January 1914	73.5	Kiyosu	Aichi
NH43	Marunouchi	丸ノ内		22 September 1914	74.3	Kiyosu	Aichi
NH44	Shin-Kiyosu	新清洲		3 February 1928	75.2	Kiyosu	Aichi
NH45	Ōsato	大里		3 February 1928	77.5	Inazawa	Aichi
NH46	Okuda	奥田		3 February 1928	78.8	Inazawa	Aichi
NH47	Kōnomiya	国府宮		15 February 1924	80.9	Inazawa	Aichi
NH48	Shima-Ujinaga	島氏永		24 January 1928	82.9	Inazawa; Ichinomiya (Note: The two platforms are located in a different municipality.)	Aichi
NH49	Myōkōji	妙興寺		15 February 1924	84.7	Ichinomiya	Aichi
NH50	Meitetsu Ichinomiya	名鉄一宮	Bisai Line (NH50); Tōkaidō Main Line (Owari-Ichinomiya: CA72)	15 February 1924	86.4	Ichinomiya	Aichi
NH51	Imaise	今伊勢		29 April 1935	88.3	Ichinomiya	Aichi
NH52	Iwato	石刀		29 April 1935	89.2	Ichinomiya	Aichi
NH53	Shin Kisogawa	新木曽川		29 April 1935	91.2	Ichinomiya	Aichi
NH54	Kuroda	黒田		15 September 1936	92.1	Ichinomiya	Aichi
NH55	Kisogawa-Zutsumi	木曽川堤		1 March 1939	93.9	Ichinomiya	Aichi
NH56	Kasamatsu	笠松	Takehana Line (NH56)	29 April 1935	95.1	Kasamatsu	Gifu
NH57	Ginan	岐南		2 June 1914	96.9	Ginan	Gifu
NH58	Chajo	茶所		2 June 1914	98.3	Gifu	Gifu
NH59	Kanō	加納		2 June 1914	98.7	Gifu	Gifu
NH60	Meitetsu Gifu	名鉄岐阜	Kakamigahara Line (NH60); Gifu: Tōkaidō Main Line (CA74) Takayama Line (CG00)	18 April 1948	99.8	Gifu	Gifu

== See also ==
- List of railway lines in Japan
