= Shin-Kisogawa Station =

Railway station in Ichinomiya, Aichi Prefecture, Japan

Shin-Kisogawa Station 新木曽川駅

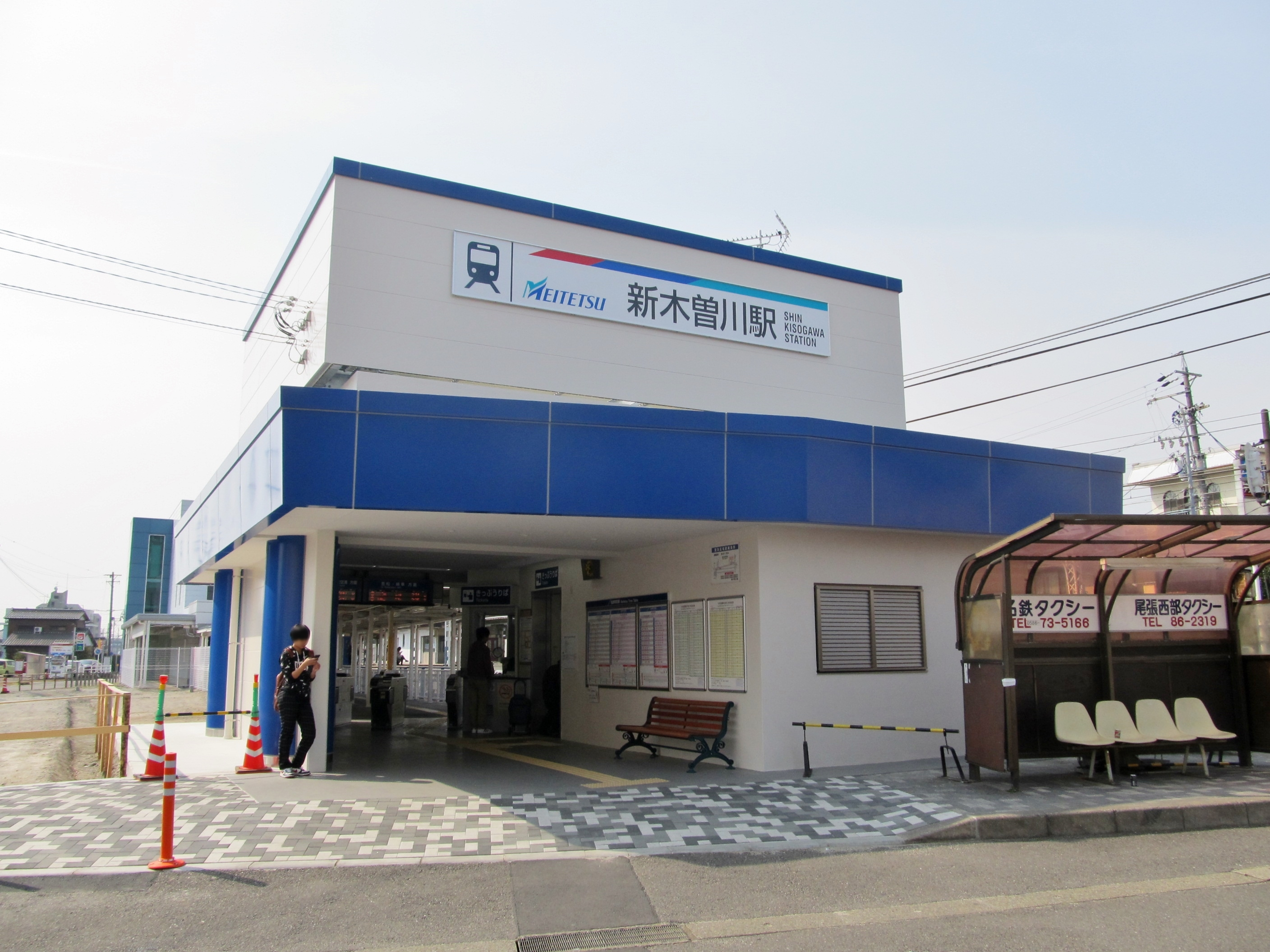
- Shin-Kisogawa Station in March 2006

General information
- Location: Sannotōri-203 Kisogawachō Kuroda, Ichinomiya-shi, Aichiken 493-0001; Japan
- Coordinates: 35.3418°N 136.7793°E
- Operator: Meitetsu
- Line: ■ Meitetsu Nagoya Line
- Distance: 91.2 kilometers from Toyohashi
- Platforms: 2 island platforms

Other information
- Status: Staffed
- Station code: NH53
- Website: Official website

History
- Opened: April 29, 1935

Passengers
- FY2008: 2660 daily
Location
- Location within Aichi Prefecture Location within Japan

Shin-Kisogawa Station (新木曽川駅, Shin Kisogawa-eki) is a railway station in the city of Ichinomiya, Aichi Prefecture, Japan, operated by Meitetsu.

== Lines ==
Shin Kisogawa Station is served by the Meitetsu Nagoya Main Line and is 91.2 kilometers from the terminus of the line at Toyohashi Station.

== Station layout ==
The station has two island platforms with passing loops, connected by a footbridge. The station has automated ticket machines, Manaca automated turnstiles, and is staffed.

=== Platforms ===
| 1, 2 | ■ Meitetsu Nagoya Main Line | For Meitetsu Gifu |
| 3, 4 | ■ Meitetsu Nagoya Main Line | For Meitetsu Ichinomiya and Meitetsu Nagoya |

== Adjacent stations ==
| ← | Service | → |
Meitetsu Nagoya Main Line
| Meitetsu Ichinomiya | Rapid Express (快速急行) | Kasamatsu |
| Meitetsu Ichinomiya | Express (急行) | Kasamatsu |
| Meitetsu Ichinomiya | Semi Express (準急) | Kasamatsu |
| Iwato | Local (普通) | Kuroda |

== Station history ==
Shin-Kisogawa Station was opened on April 29, 1935. The station building was destroyed by a fire in 1965 and rebuilt in 1966.

== Passenger statistics ==
In fiscal 2013, the station was used by an average of 5848 passengers daily.

== Surrounding area ==
- former Kisogawa Town Hall
- Site of Kuroda Castle

== See also ==
- List of railway stations in Japan
