= Otogawa Station =

Railway station in Okazaki, Aichi Prefecture, Japan

Otogawa Station 男川駅

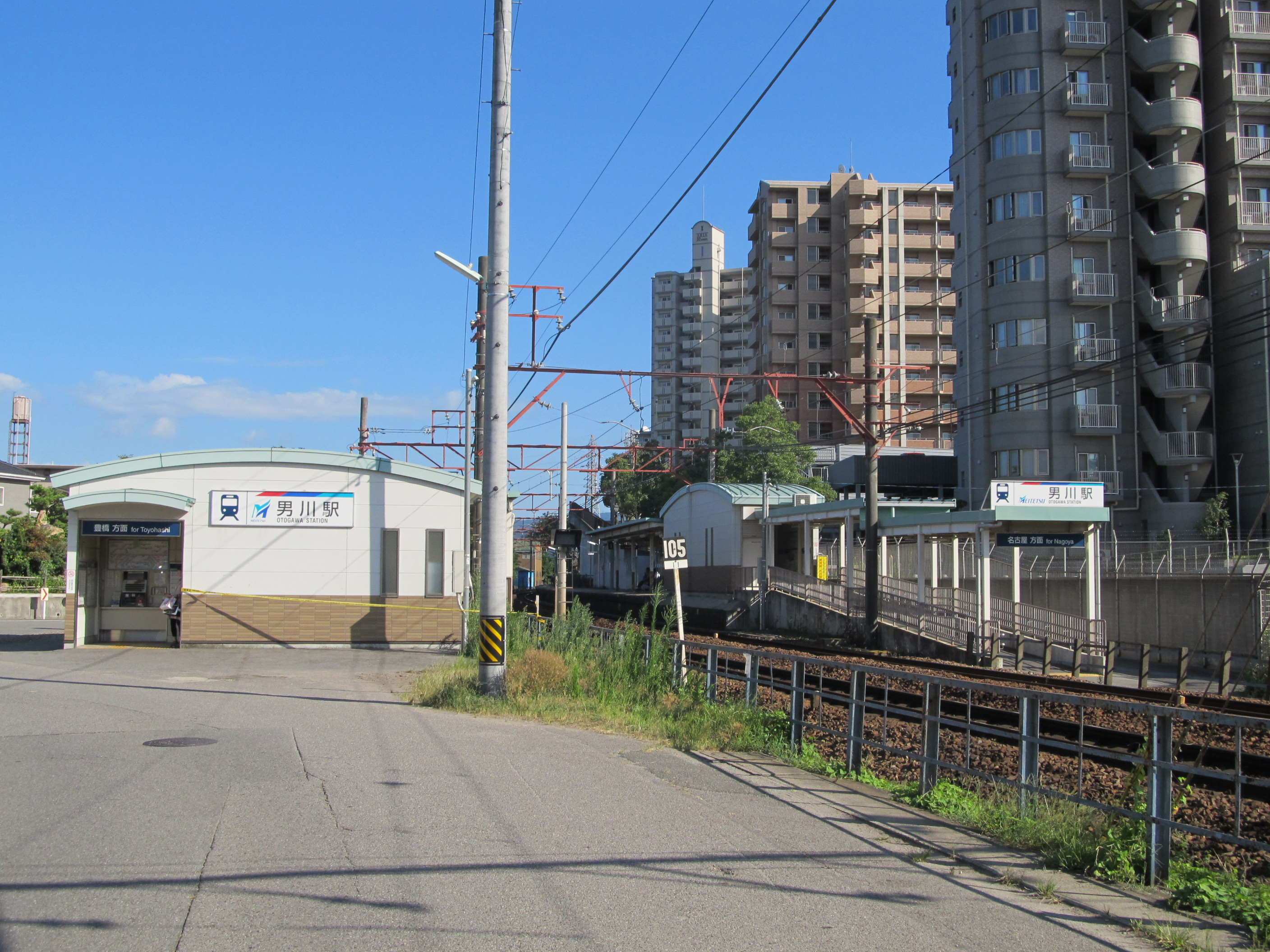
- Otogawa Station in August 2012

General information
- Location: Yōji-3 Ōnishichō, Okazaki-shi, Aichi-ken 444-0811; Japan
- Coordinates: 34.9372°N 137.1832°E
- Operator: Meitetsu
- Line: ■ Meitetsu Nagoya Line
- Distance: 27.6 kilometers from Toyohashi
- Platforms: 2 side platforms

Other information
- Status: Staffed
- Station code: NH12
- Website: Official website

History
- Opened: 1 April 1926; 100 years ago

Passengers
- FY2017: 4,073 daily
Location
- Location within Aichi Prefecture Location within Japan

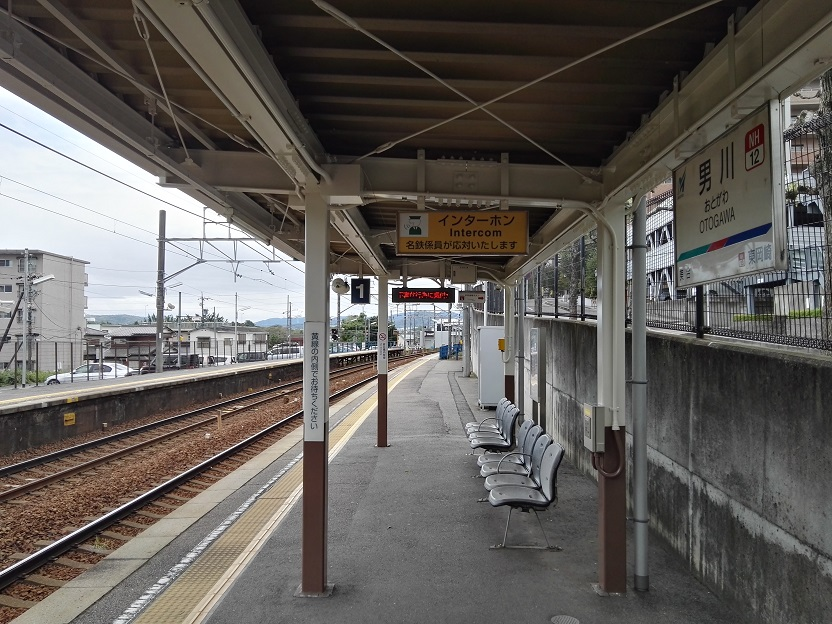
Platforms

Otogawa Station (男川駅, Otogawa-eki) is a railway station in the city of Okazaki, Aichi, Japan, operated by Meitetsu.

== Lines ==
Otogawa Station is served by the Meitetsu Nagoya Main Line and is 27.6 kilometers from the terminus of the line at Toyohashi Station.

== Station layout ==
The station has two opposed side platforms connected by an underground passage. The station has automated ticket machines, Manaca automated turnstiles and is staffed.

=== Platforms ===
1	■ Nagoya Main Line	For Higashi Okazaki and Meitetsu Nagoya
2	■ Nagoya Main Line	For Toyohashi and Toyokawa-inari

== Adjacent stations ==
←	Service	→
Meitetsu Nagoya Main Line
Miai	Semi Express (準急)	Higashi Okazaki
Miai	Local (普通)	Higashi Okazaki

== Station history ==
Otogawa Station was opened on 1 April 1926 as a station on the privately held Aichi Electric Railway. The Aichi Electric Railway was acquired by the Meitetsu Group on 1 August 1935. The station platforms and tracks were elevated on 24 October 1992.

== Passenger statistics ==
In fiscal 2017, the station was used by an average of 4,073 passengers daily.

== Surrounding area ==
- Tasumigauka Elementary School
- Okazaki Commercial High School

== See also ==
- List of railway stations in Japan
