= Goyu Station =

Railway station in Toyokawa, Aichi Prefecture, Japan

Goyu Station 御油駅

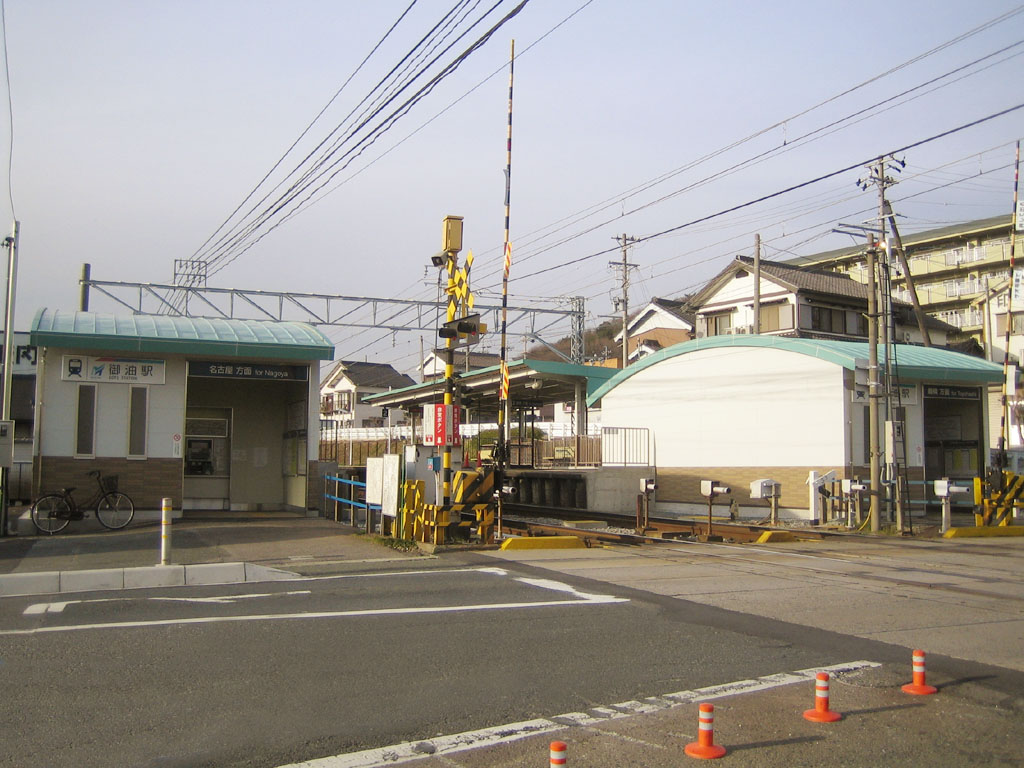
- Goyu Station, February 2006

General information
- Location: Nishiiriyo Goyucho, Toyokawa-shi, Aichi-ken 441-0211; Japan
- Coordinates: 34.8460°N 137.3212°E
- Operator: Meitetsu
- Line: ■ Meitetsu Nagoya Line
- Distance: 10.7 kilometers from Toyohashi
- Platforms: 2 side platforms
- Tracks: 2

Construction
- Structure type: At-grade
- Cycle facilities: Yes
- Accessible: Yes

Other information
- Status: Unstaffed
- Station code: NH05
- Website: Official website

History
- Opened: 1 April 1926; 100 years ago

Passengers
- FY2017: 312 daily

Services
Preceding station	Meitetsu	Following station
Kō towards Toyohashi	Nagoya Main Line Local	Meiden-Akasaka towards Meitetsu Gifu
Location
- Location within Aichi Prefecture Location within Japan

Goyu Station (御油駅, Goyu-eki) is a railway station in the city of Toyokawa, Aichi, Japan, operated by Meitetsu.

== Lines ==
Goyu Station is served by the Meitetsu Nagoya Main Line and is 10.7 kilometers from the terminus of the line at Toyohashi Station.

== Station layout ==
The station has two opposed side platforms connected by a level crossing. The station has automated ticket machines, Manaca automated turnstiles and is unattended.

=== Platforms ===
1	■ Nagoya Main Line	For Higashi Okazaki and Meitetsu Nagoya
2	■ Nagoya Main Line	For Toyohashi and Toyokawa-inari

== Station history ==
Goyu Station was opened on 1 April 1926 as Moto Goyu Station (本御油駅, Moto-Goyu-eki) on the Aichi Electric Railway. On 1 April 1935, the Aichi Electric Railway merged with the Nagoya Railroad (the forerunner of present-day Meitetsu). The station was renamed to its present name on 1 March 1949. The station has been unattended since 1967.

== Passenger statistics ==
In fiscal 2017, the station was used by an average of 312 passengers daily.

== Surrounding area ==
- Japan National Route 1
- Goyu Elementary School

== See also ==
- List of railway stations in Japan
