= Meiden Nagasawa Station =

Railway station in Toyokawa, Aichi Prefecture, Japan

Meiden Nagasawa Station 名電長沢駅

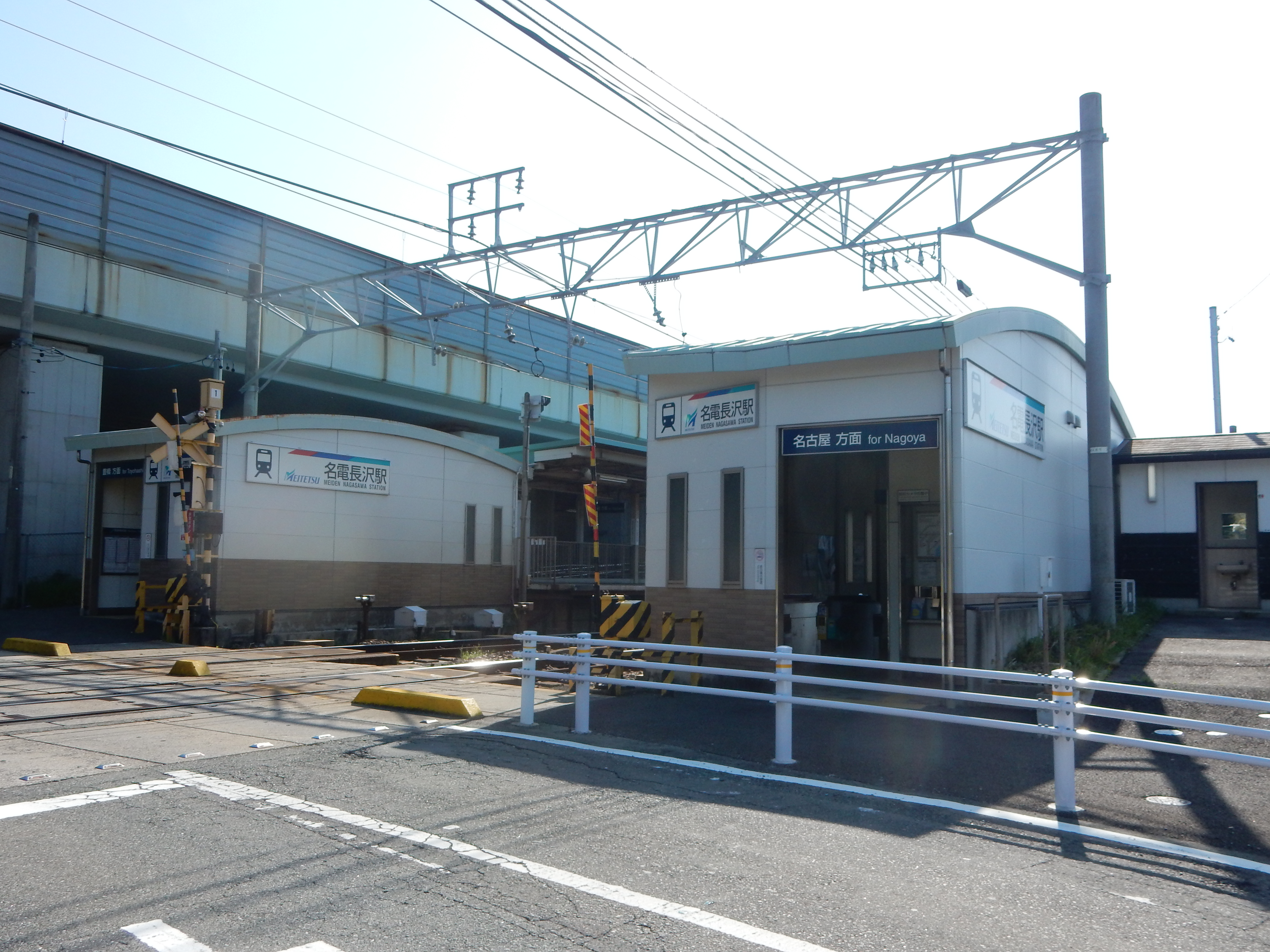
- Meiden Nagasawa Station, April 2018

General information
- Location: Otowa Nagasawacho, Toyokawa-shi, Aichi-ken 441-0203; Japan
- Coordinates: 34.8718°N 137.2882°E
- Operator: Meitetsu
- Line: ■ Meitetsu Nagoya Line
- Distance: 15.0 kilometers from Toyohashi
- Platforms: 2 side platforms
- Tracks: 2

Construction
- Structure type: At-grade
- Cycle facilities: Yes
- Accessible: Yes

Other information
- Status: Unstaffed
- Station code: NH07
- Website: Official website

History
- Opened: 1 April 1926; 100 years ago

Passengers
- FY2017: 344 daily

Services
Preceding station	Meitetsu	Following station
Meiden-Akasaka towards Toyohashi	Nagoya Main Line Local	Motojuku towards Meitetsu Gifu
Location
- Location within Aichi Prefecture Location within Japan

Meiden Nagasawa Station (名電長沢駅, Meiden Nagasawa-eki) is a railway station in the city of Toyokawa, Aichi, Japan, operated by Meitetsu.

== Lines ==
Meiden Nagasawa Station is served by the Meitetsu Nagoya Main Line and is 15.0 kilometers from the terminus of the line at Toyohashi Station.

== Station layout ==
The station has two elevated opposed side platforms with the station building underneath. The station has automated ticket machines, Manaca automated turnstiles and is unattended.

=== Platforms ===
1	■ Nagoya Main Line	For Higashi Okazaki and Meitetsu Nagoya
2	■ Nagoya Main Line	For Toyohashi and Toyokawa-inari

== Station history ==
Meiden Nagasawa Station was opened on 1 April 1926 as Aiden Nagasawa Station (愛電長沢駅, Aiden Nagasawa-eki) on the Aichi Electric Railway. On 1 April 1935, the Aichi Electric Railway merged with the Nagoya Railroad (the forerunner of present-day Meitetsu). The station was renamed to its present name on 1 December 1938.

== Passenger statistics ==
In fiscal 2017, the station was used by an average of 344 passengers daily.

== Surrounding area ==
- Japan National Route 1

== See also ==
- List of railway stations in Japan
