= Sakura Station (Aichi) =

Railway station in Nagoya, Japan

Coordinates: 35.1064°N 136.935°E

Sakura Station 桜駅

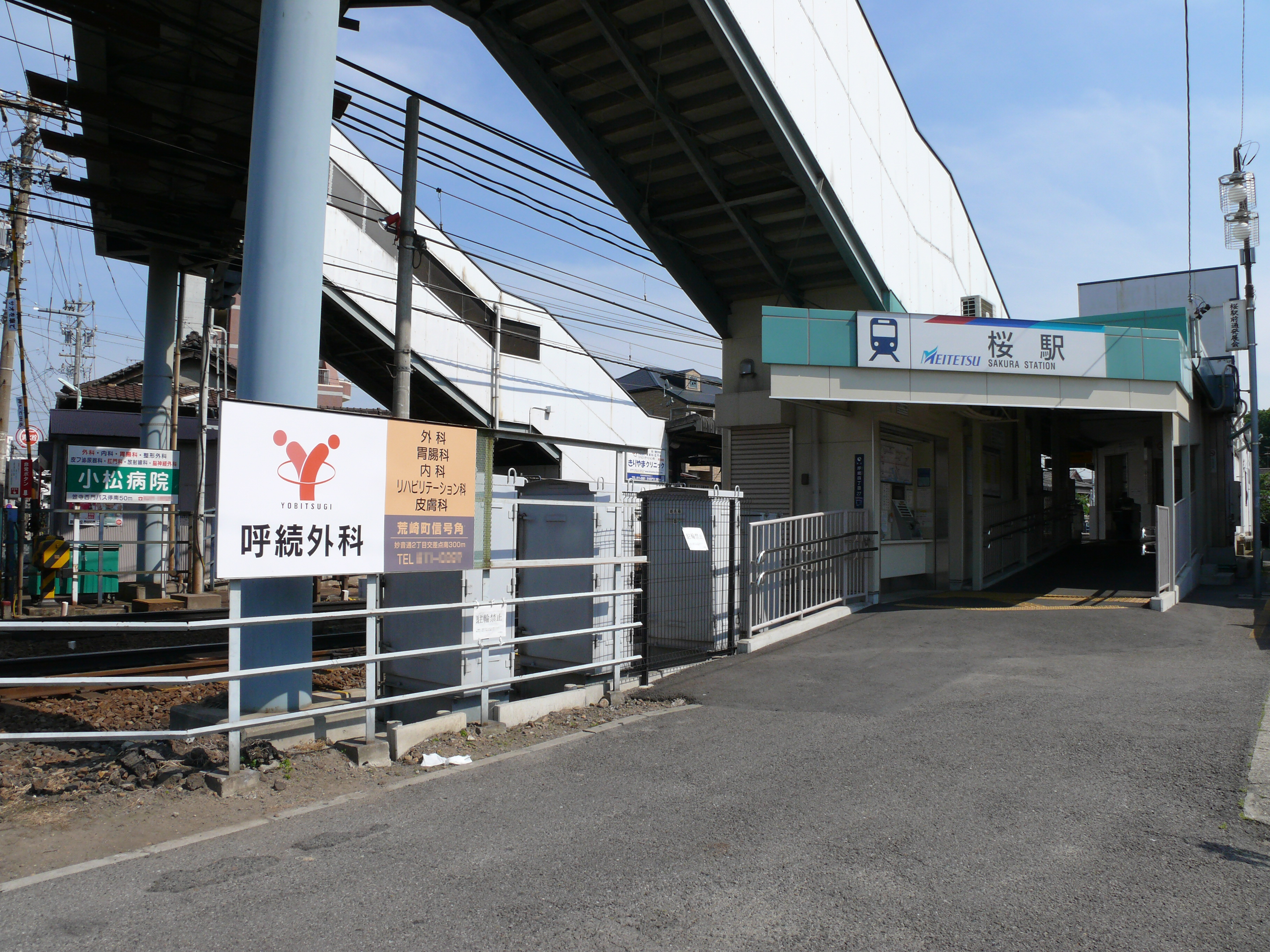
- Entrance

General information
- Location: Yobitsugi 4-27-15, Minami, Nagoya, Aichi （愛知県名古屋市南区呼続四丁目27-15） Japan
- Operator: Nagoya Railroad
- Line: Meitetsu Nagoya Main Line

History
- Opened: 19 March 1917; 109 years ago

Passengers
- 2008: 1449 daily

Services
| Preceding station | Meitetsu | Following station |
|---|---|---|
| Moto Kasadera towards Toyohashi | Nagoya Main Line Local | Yobitsugi towards Meitetsu Gifu |
Location

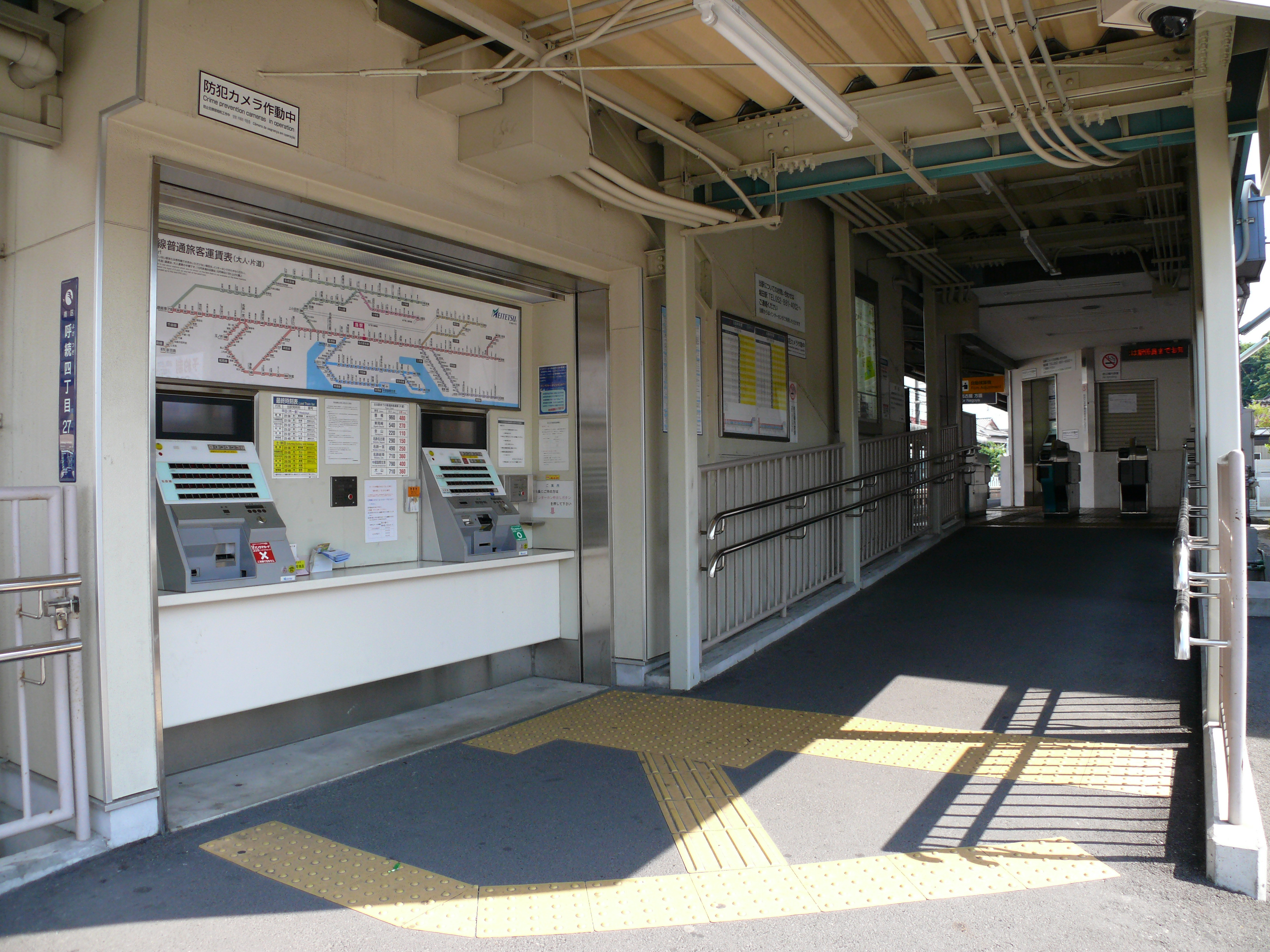
Ticket gate

Sakura Station (桜駅, Sakura-eki) is a railway station on the Meitetsu Nagoya Main Line located in Minami-ku, Nagoya, Japan. It is located 58.9 kilometers from the junction of the Nagoya Main Line at Toyohashi.

== History ==
Sakura Station was opened on 19 March 1917 as a station on the Aichi Electric Railway. On 1 April 1935, the Aichi Electric Railway merged with the Nagoya Railroad (the forerunner of present-day Meitetsu). The station has been unattended since 15 September 2004.

== Lines ==
- Meitetsu
  - Meitetsu Nagoya Main Line

== Layout ==
Sakura Station has two opposed side platforms connected by an overpass.

=== Platforms ===
| 1 | ■ Meitetsu Nagoya Main Line | For Meitetsu Nagoya, Meitetsu Gifu and Inuyama |
| 2 | ■ Meitetsu Nagoya Main Line | For Higashi Okazaki and Toyohashi |
