= Kuroda Station (Aichi) =

Railway station in Ichinomiya, Aichi Prefecture, Japan

Kuroda Station 黒田駅

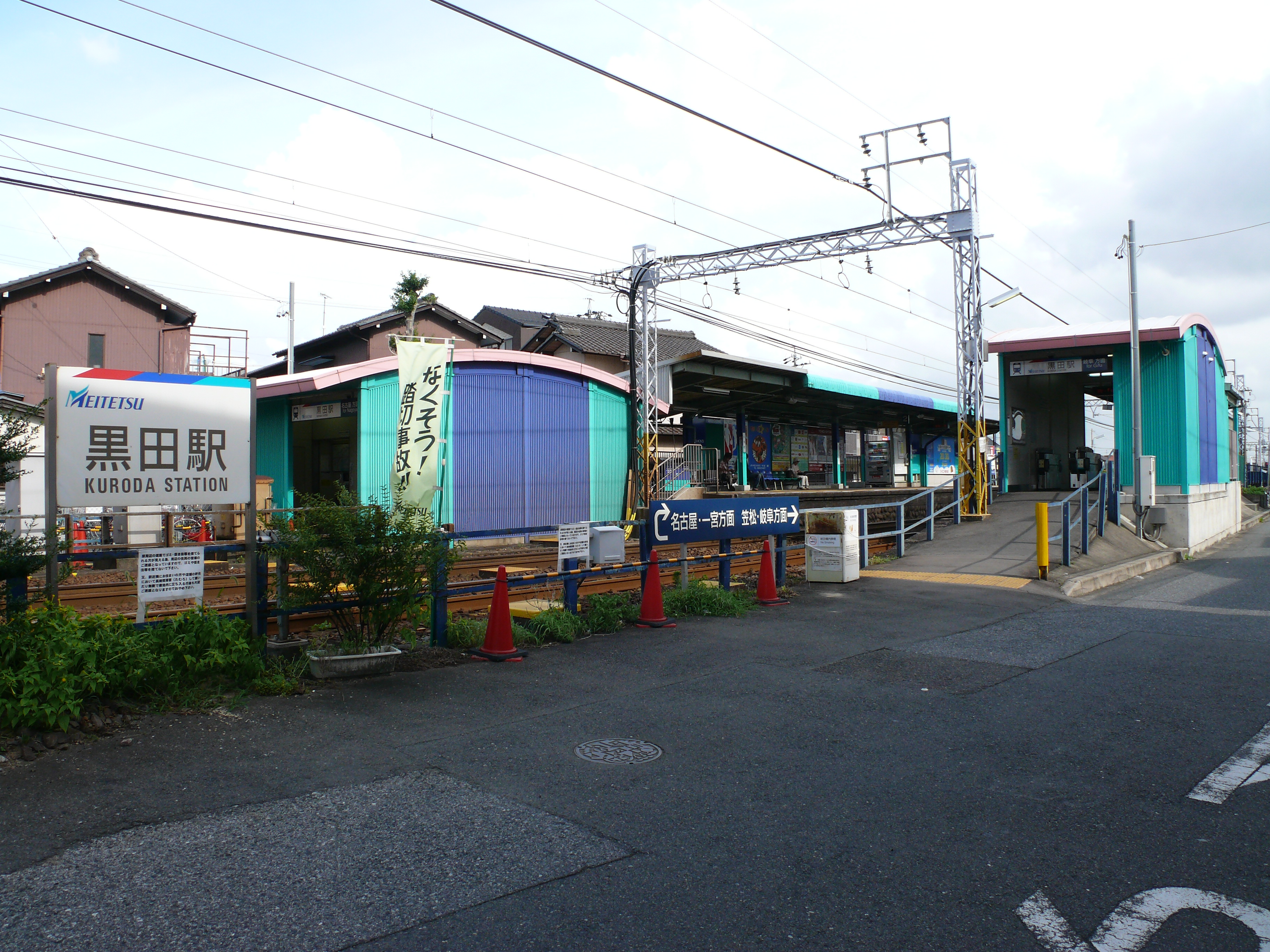
- Kuroda Station in August 2007

General information
- Location: Nishihariguchikitanokiri-12-4 Kisogawacho Kuroda, Ichinomiya-shi, Aichi-ken 493-0001; Japan
- Coordinates: 35.3503°N 136.777°E
- Operator: Meitetsu
- Line: ■ Meitetsu Nagoya Line
- Distance: 92.1 kilometers from Toyohashi
- Platforms: 2 side platforms
- Tracks: 2

Construction
- Structure type: At-grade
- Accessible: Yes

Other information
- Status: Unstaffed
- Station code: NH54
- Website: Official website

History
- Opened: September 15, 1936

Passengers
- 2006: 827

Services
Preceding station	Meitetsu	Following station
Shin-Kisogawa towards Toyohashi	Nagoya Main Line Local	Kisogawa-zutsumi towards Meitetsu Gifu
Location
- Location within Aichi Prefecture Location within Japan

Kuroda Station (黒田駅, Kuroda-eki) is a railway station in the city of Ichinomiya, Aichi Prefecture, Japan, operated by Meitetsu.

== Lines ==
Kuroda Station is served by the Meitetsu Nagoya Main Line and is 92.1 kilometers from the terminus of the line at Toyohashi Station.

== Station layout ==
The station has two opposed side platforms connected by a level crossing. The station has automated ticket machines, Manaca automated turnstiles and is unattended.

=== Platforms ===
1	■ Meitetsu Nagoya Main Line	For Meitetsu-Gifu
2	■ Meitetsu Nagoya Main Line	For Meitetsu-Ichinomiya and Meitetsu-Nagoya

== Station history ==
Kuroda Station was opened on September 15, 1936.

== Passenger statistics ==
In fiscal 2013, the station was used by an average of 2128 passengers daily.

== Surrounding area ==
- Kisogawa Hospital
- Aeon Mall Kisogawa

== See also ==
- List of railway stations in Japan
