= Marunouchi Station =

Marunouchi Station is the name of several railway stations in Japan:

- Marunouchi Station (Kiyosu) in Kiyosu, Aichi on the Nagoya Railroad Nagoya Main Line
- Marunouchi Station (Nagoya) in Naka-ku, Nagoya, Aichi on the Nagoya Municipal Subway Tsurumai Line and Sakuradōri Line
- Marunouchi Station (Toyama) in Toyama, Toyama
- Nijubashimae Station (Marunouchi) in Tokyo
