= Kaigarayama Shell Midden =

Shell miden in Kiyosu, Tōkai, Japan

- 貝殻山貝塚 (Japanese)
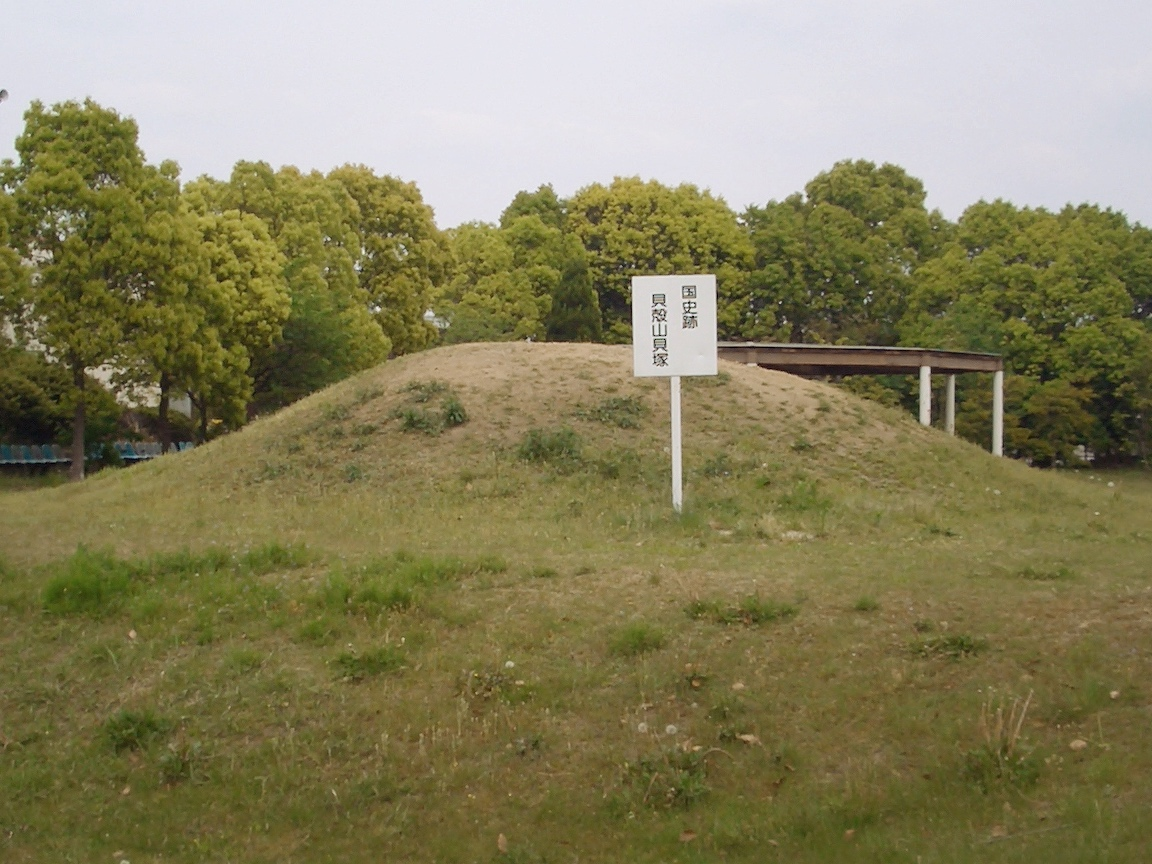
- Kaigarayama Shell Midden

- Kaigarayama shell midden Kaigarayama Shell Midden (Japan)
- 35°13′07″N 136°51′05″E
- Type: shell midden
- Periods: Yayoi period
- Location: Kiyosu, Aichi, Japan
- Region: Tōkai region

Site notes
- Elevation: 5 m (16 ft)
- Owner: National Historic Site
- Public access: Yes, on-site museum

The Kaigarayama shell midden (貝殻山貝塚, Kaigarayama kaizuka) is an archaeological site containing the ruins of a large-scale Yayoi period settlement with an associated shell midden located in what is now part of the city of Kiyosu, Aichi in the Tōkai region of Japan. The shell midden was designated a National Historic Site of Japan in 1971.

== Overview ==
The Kaigarayama Shell Midden is associated with the neighboring Asahi village ruins, which is located 20 minutes on foot from Shin-Kiyosu Station on the Meitetsu Nagoya Main Line. The midden has a diameter of 15 meters and a depth of 2.5 meters. The site is in a low-lying alluvial area of the Kiso River, with an elevation of five meters above the modern sea level, at the northern end of the Nōbi Plain.

The lowest layer of the midden dates from the final stages of the Jōmon period and the upper strata is from the early Kofun period, so the midden spans the whole of the Yayoi period. Along with the usual clam shells and fish and animal bones, the midden was found to contain many examples of stone tools and Yayoi pottery. The presence of early Yayoi pottery typical of the Onga River of western Japan, and streak-type Jōmon pottery shards typically from eastern Japan together in the same strata indicate that both cultures co-existed for a time in the same settlement. The midden was discovered in 1929, and was excavated in 1972 due to construction of an interchange junction on Japan National Route 302. It is the largest of several middens in the area.

The Asahi village ruins are one of the largest Yayoi period settlement ruins in Japan, and extended for 1.4 kilometers east-to-west by 0.8 kilometers north-to-south and had an estimated population of over 1000 people. It was a moated settlement, and was accompanied by a number of square burial tumuli.

In 1975, a prefectural museum, the Historic Site Kaigarayama Shell Midden Exchange Center (史跡貝殻山貝塚交流館, Shiseki Kaigara-san Kaidzuka kōryū-kan) opened in a corner of the site, where some of the excavated artifacts are displayed.

== See also ==
- List of Historic Sites of Japan (Aichi)
