= 大里駅 =

大里駅 may refer to:

- Ōsato Station
- Moji Station, also called as Dairi Station
