= Higashi-Biwajima Station =

Railway station in Nagoya, Japan

Coordinates: 35.1896°N 136.8704°E

Higashi-Biwajima Station 東枇杷島駅

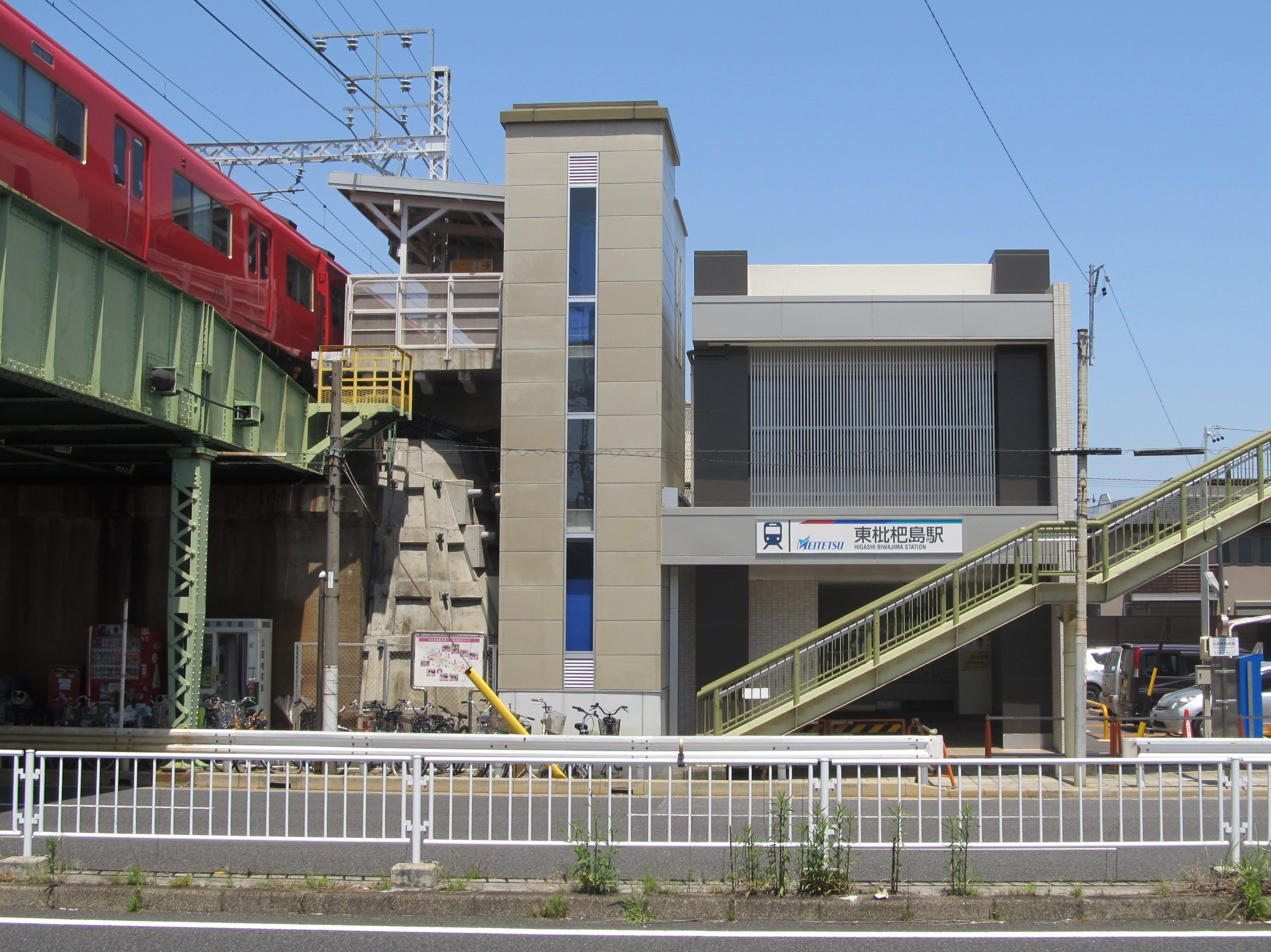
- Entrance

General information
- Location: Biwajima 1-18-9, Nishi, Nagoya, Aichi （愛知県名古屋市西区枇杷島一丁目18-9 ） Japan
- Operator: Meitetsu
- Lines: Nagoya Main Line; Inuyama Line

History
- Opened: 1912

Passengers
- 2006: 924,752

Services
Preceding station	Meitetsu	Following station
Sako towards Ina	Nagoya Main Line Local	Nishi-Biwajima towards Meitetsu Gifu
through to Nagoya Main Line	Inuyama Line Local	Shimo Otai towards Shin-Unuma
Location

Higashi-Biwajima Station (東枇杷島駅, Higashi Biwajima-eki) is a railway station operated by Nagoya Railroad located in Nishi-ku, Nagoya, Aichi, Japan. This station is unstaffed.

== Lines ==
- Nagoya Railroad
  - Nagoya Main Line
  - Inuyama Line

== Layout ==
The station has two side platforms serving two tracks.

=== Platforms ===
Northbound	■ Nagoya Main Line	for Sukaguchi, Ichinomiya and Gifu
Northbound	■ Tsushima Line	for Saya and Yatomi
Northbound	■ Inuyama Line	for Iwakura and Inuyama
Southbound	■ Nagoya Main Line	for Nagoya, Higashi-Okazaki, Toyohashi and Nishio
Southbound	■ Tokoname Line, Airport Line	for Otagawa and Central Japan International Airport
Southbound	■ Kowa Line	for Chita-Handa and Kowa
