= Shin-Kiyosu Station =

Railway station in Kiyosu, Aichi Prefecture, Japan

Shin Kiyosu Station 新清洲駅

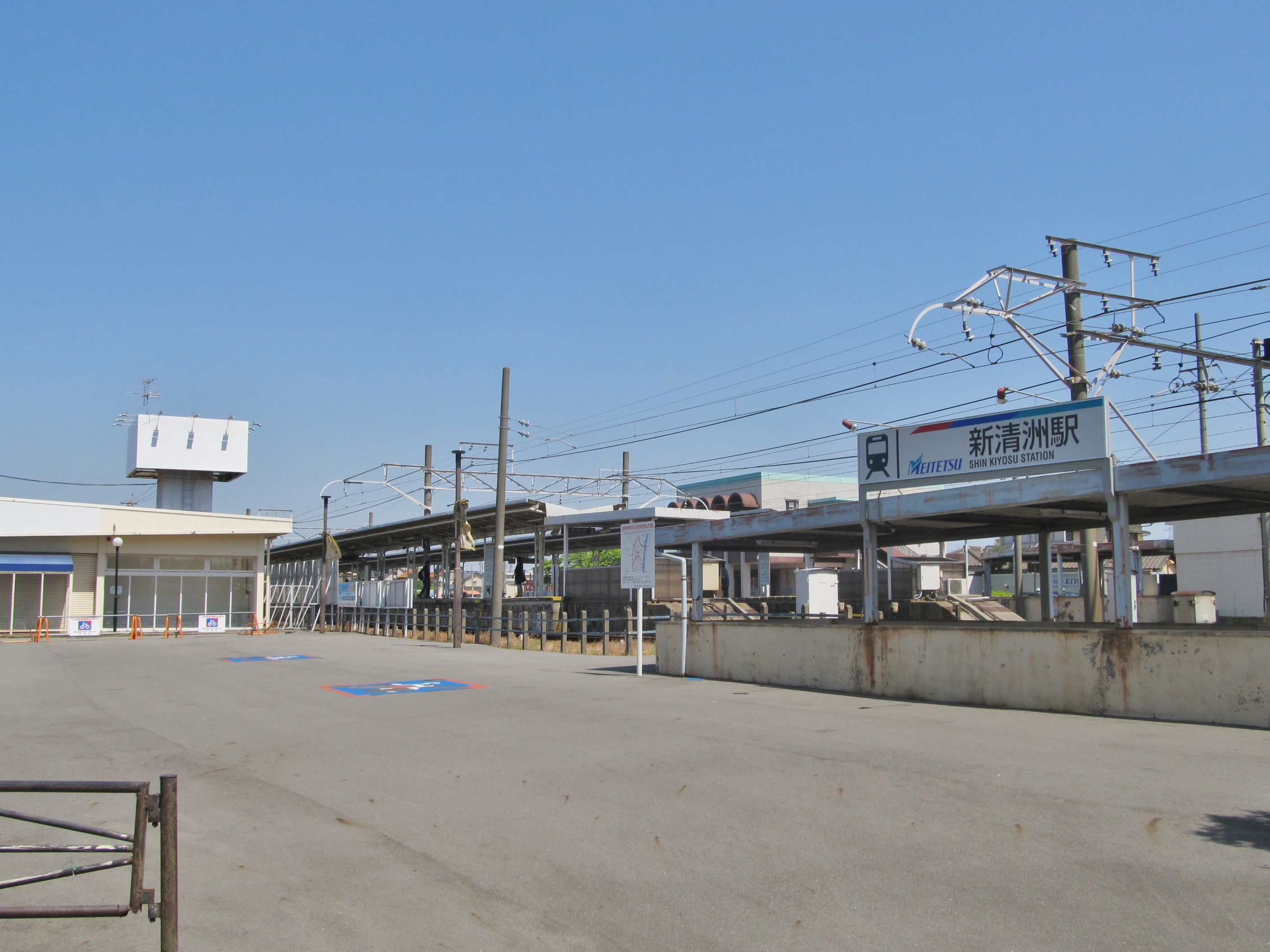
- West Gate, Shin Kiyosu Station, May 2018

General information
- Location: 1-1-1 Shinkiyosu, Kiyosu-shi, Aichi-ken 452-0943; Japan
- Coordinates: 35.2113°N 136.8358°E
- Operator: Meitetsu
- Line: ■ Meitetsu Nagoya Main Line
- Distance: 75.2 kilometers from Toyohashi
- Platforms: 2 island platforms

Other information
- Status: Staffed
- Station code: NH44
- Website: Official website

History
- Opened: February 3, 1928
- Former names: Nishi Kiyosu (to 1948)

Passengers
- FY2013: 7,853
Location
- Location within Aichi Prefecture Location within Japan

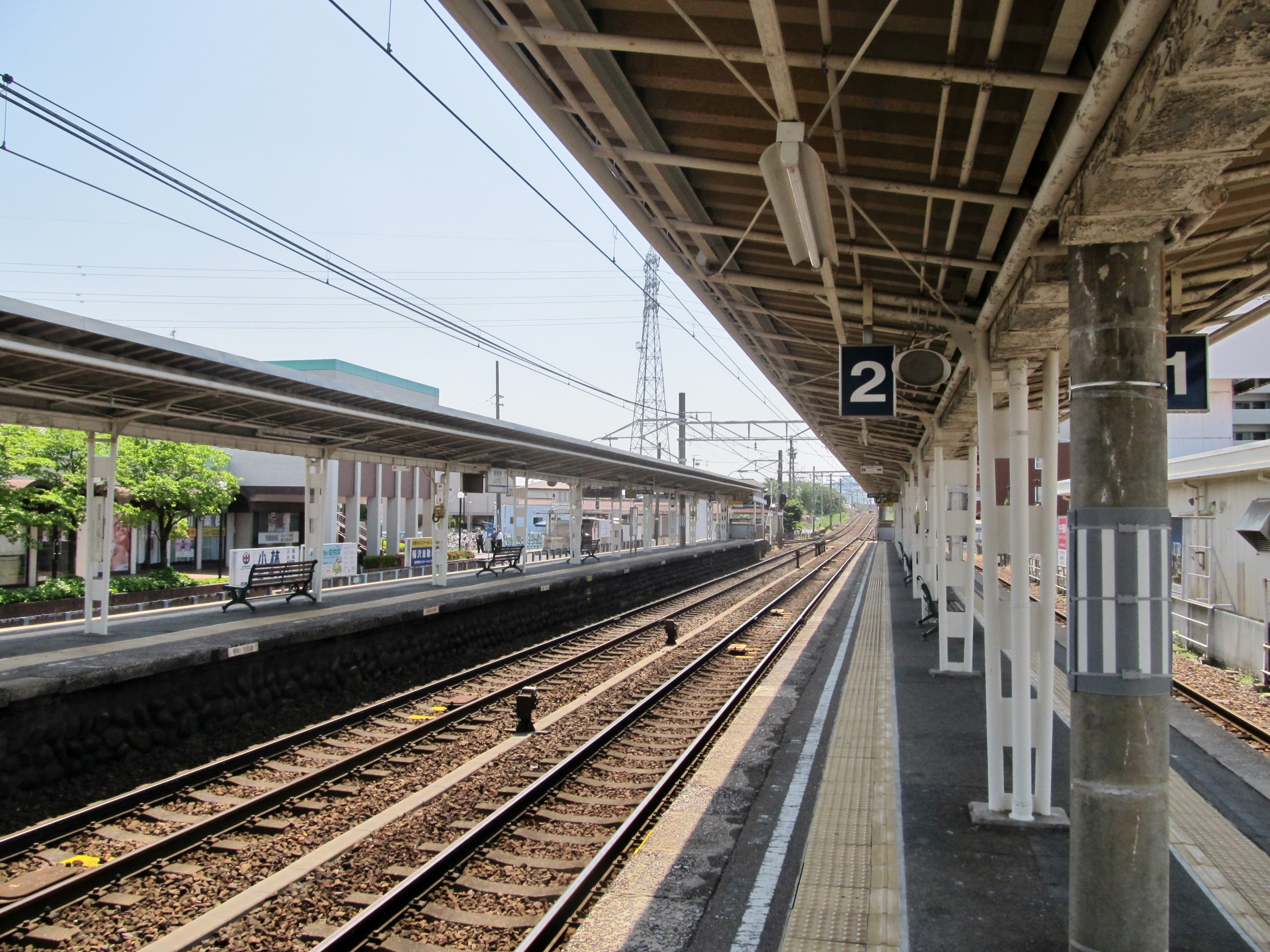
Platforms

Shin Kiyosu Station (新清洲駅, Shin Kiyosu-eki) is a railway station in the city of Kiyosu, Aichi Prefecture, Japan, operated by Meitetsu.

== Lines ==
Shin Kiyosu Station is served by the Meitetsu Nagoya Main Line, and is located 75.2 kilometers from the starting point of the line at Toyohashi.

== Station layout ==
The station has two above-ground island platforms with and underground station building. The station has automated ticket machines, Manaca automated turnstiles and is staffed.

=== Platforms ===
1, 2	■ Nagoya Main Line	ForMeitetsu-Ichinomiya and Meitetsu-Gifu
3, 4	■ Nagoya Main Line	For Meitetsu-Nagoya, Kanayama, and Toyohashi

== Adjacent stations ==
←	Service	→
Meitetsu Nagoya Main Line
Sukaguchi	Rapid Express	Kōnomiya
Sukaguchi	Express	Ōsato
Sukaguchi	Semi Express	Ōsato
Marunouchi	Local	Ōsato

== Station history ==
Shin Kiyosu Station was opened on February 3, 1928 as Nishi-Kiyosu Station (西清洲駅, Nishi-Kiyosu-eki). It was renamed to its present name on May 16, 1948. The station building was relocated underground in 1975.

== Passenger statistics ==
In fiscal 2013, the station was used by an average of 7,853 passengers daily.

== Surrounding area ==
- former Kiyosu Town Hall
- JR East Kiyosu Station

== See also ==
- List of railway stations in Japan
