= Nishikasugai District =

District on the central Owari Region in Aichi Prefecture, Japan

Coordinates: 35.2550°N 136.9173°E

Map of Nishikasugai District in Aichi Prefecture

Nishikasugai (西春日井郡, Nishikasugai-gun) is a district located on the central Owari Region in Aichi Prefecture, Japan.

As of October 1, 2019, the district has a population of 15,630 with a density of 2,529 per km^{2}. The total area is 6.18 km^{2}.

== Municipalities ==
The district consists of one town:

- Toyoyama (Note: Classified as a town.)

== Description ==
During the old days, the district extended as far as Nagoya Castle, but since Taisho Era to the 1950s, most of the areas were merged into the city of Nagoya.

As of the early 2000s, there were proposals to turn the entire district into a city but the merger was killed due to differences of opinion.

== History ==
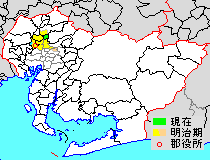
Map showing original extent of Nishikasugai District in Aichi Prefecture: * yellow – areas formerly within the district borders during the early Meiji period: 1. Toyoyana-machi

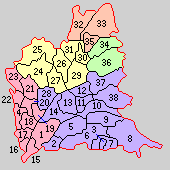
Colored areas are in this district.

=== District Timeline ===
- February 5, 1880 – Kasugai District was split off into Higashikasugai and Nishikasugai Districts during the early Meiji period establishment of the municipalities system, which initially consisted of 2 towns and 81 villages. Its district headquarters was located at the village of Shimootai.
- October 1, 1889 – With the establishment of the municipalities system in effect, Nishikasugai District consisted of four towns (Biwajima, Nishibiwajima, Kiyosu and Shimizu) and 34 villages.
- December 17, 1890 – The village of Shinkawa gained town status. (5 towns, 33 villages)
- April 1, 1891 – The establishment of the district/county system was implemented.
- July 16, 1900 – The village of Gojō was formed from parts of the village of Kumanoshō [the section of Yakushiji] and parts of the village of Ogi [the section of Fujishima]. (5 towns, 34 villages)
- September 28, 1900 – The villages of Sukaguchi (Sugaguchi) and Nishihorie merged to form the town of Tōei (Momoe). (6 towns, 32 villages)
- April 1, 1906 – The town of Tōei and the villages of Terano and Ahara were absorbed into the town of Shinkawa. (5 towns, 30 villages)
- July 11, 1906 – The following towns and villages were implemented with the following mergers: (5 towns and 25 villages)
  - the village of Yamada: the former villages of Hirata, Ōnogi (Ōnoki), Hira, Kamiotai and Nakaotai
  - the village of Kusunoki (Kusu): the former villages of Nyoi and Ajima (Ajiki)
- July 16, 1906 – The following towns and villages were implemented with the following mergers: (5 towns and 13 villages)
  - the town of Kiyosu: the former town of Kiyosu, and the former villages of Asada and Ichijō (Ichiba)
  - the village of Haruhi (Kasuga): the former villages of Shimonogō and Ochiai
  - the village of Nishiharu: the former villages of Kunotsubo, Shimojikko and Kamijikko
  - the village of Shikatsu (Morakatsu): the former villages of Kunibara (Kunohara), Shikata (Katta), Rokushi and Kumanoshō
  - the village of Kitasato: the former villages of Gojō, Ogi (Koki), Owari and Taki
  - the village of Toyoyama: the former villages of Toyoba and Aoyama
- October 1, 1909 – Parts of the village of Ōzato [section of Nishiichiba] (from Nakashima District) were incorporated into the town of Kiyosu.
- October 1, 1910 – Parts of the village of Jimokuji [section of Hazama (Mawari)] (from Kaitō District, then part of Ama District) was incorporated into the town of Kiyosu.
- 1918 – The district had an estimated population of 76,490; with 677 consisting of malaria patients.
- August 22, 1921 – The towns of Biwajima and Shimizu, and the villages of Kanagi (Kinjo), Rokugō and Sugi were merged into the city of Nagoya. Biwajima and Kanagi (Kinjo) would correspond to Nagoya's Nishi-ku; and Shimizu, Rokugō and Sugi would correspond to Nagoya's Higashi-ku. (3 towns, 10 villages)
- April 1, 1923 – The district council was abolished, while the district office remained.
- April 1, 1926 – The village of Shōnai gained town status. (4 towns, 9 villages)
- July 1, 1926 – The district office was abolished, thus the area remained for geographic purposes.
- April 1, 1933 – The village of Kawanaka was merged into the village of Hagino. (4 towns, 8 villages)
- March 1, 1937 – The town of Shōnai and the village of Hagino were merged into the city of Nagoya. Both former localities would correspond to Nagoya's Nishi-ku. (3 towns, 7 villages)
- January 1, 1943 – Parts of the town of Jimokuji [sections of Tsuchida and Kamijō] (from Ama District) were incorporated into the town of Kiyosu.
- October 1, 1955 – The villages of Yamada and Kusunoki (Kusu) were merged into the city of Nagoya. Yamada would correspond to Nagoya's Nishi-ku; and Kusunoki (Kusu) would correspond to Nagoya's Kita-ku. (3 towns, 5 villages)
- April 1, 1961 – The village of Shikatsu gained town status. (4 towns, 4 villages)
- September 1, 1963 – The village of Kitasato was split off and their sections had been annexed into the town of Shikatsu and the city of Komaki. (4 towns, 3 villages)
- November 1, 1963 – The village of Nishiharu gained town status. (5 towns, 2 villages)
- April 1, 1972 – The village of Toyoyama gained town status. (6 towns, 1 village)
- April 1, 1990 – The village of Haruhi gained town status. (7 towns)

=== Recent mergers ===
- On July 7, 2005 – The former of Kiyosu absorbed the towns of Shinkawa and Nishibiwajima to form the city of Kiyosu. (4 towns)
- On March 20, 2006 – The towns of Nishiharu and Shikatsu were merged to form the city of Kitanagoya. (2 towns)
- On October 1, 2009 – The town of Haruhi was merged into the expanded city of Kiyosu. (1 town)

== Economy ==
J-Air, a subsidiary of Japan Airlines, is headquartered in Toyoyama, Nishikasugai District, in the Nagoya Airfield Terminal Building. Nakanihon Air Service, a general aviation operator, is also located in Toyoyama on the airport grounds.

== See also ==
- Districts of Japan
- Aichi Prefecture
