= Kiyosu =

Kiyosu 清須市
- City
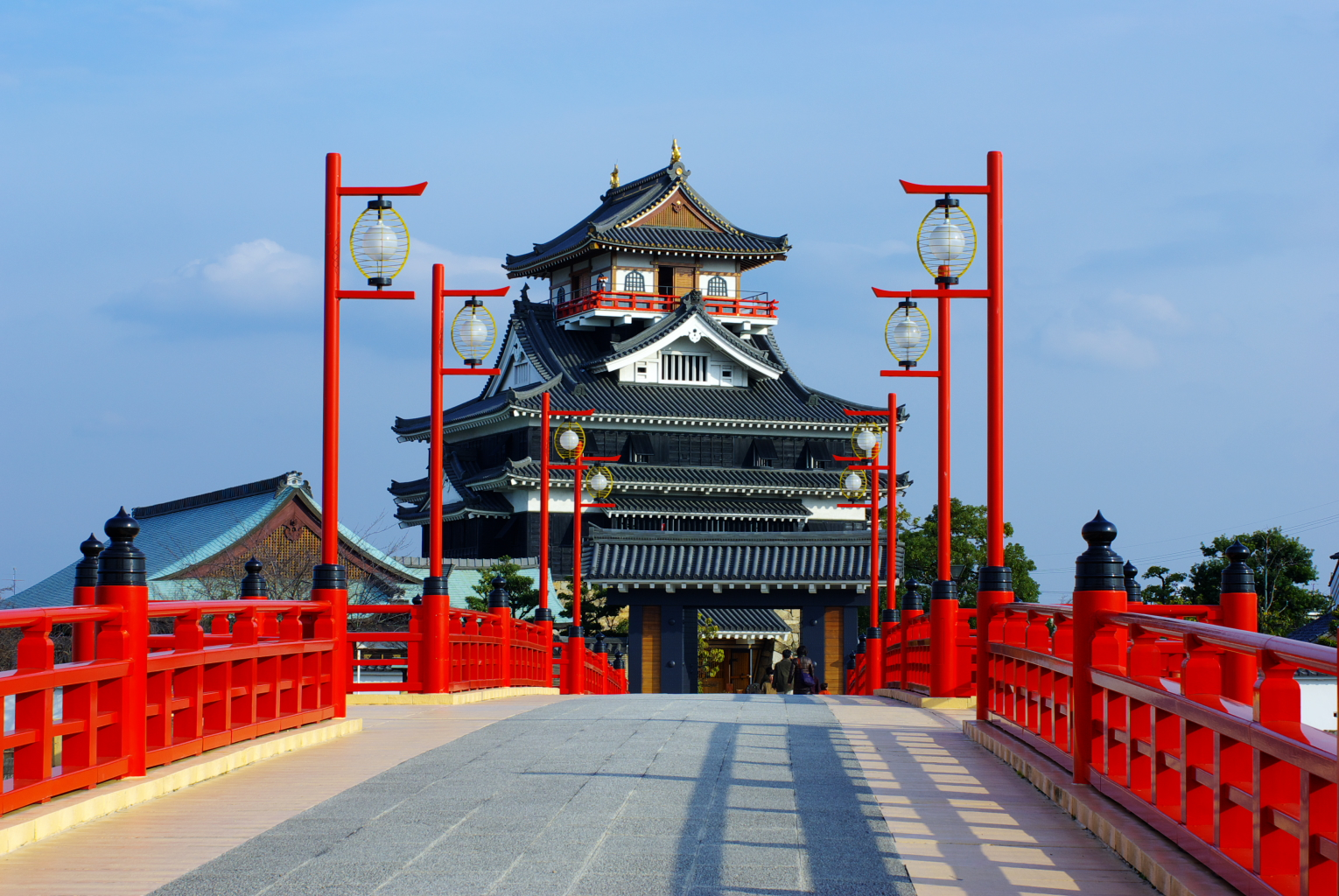
- Kiyosu Castle

- Flag Emblem

- Location of Kiyosu in Aichi Prefecture

- Coordinates: 35°11′59.3″N 136°51′10.3″E
- Country: Japan
- Region: Chūbu (Tōkai)
- Prefecture: Aichi

Government
  - Mayor: Sumio Nagata (since 2017)

Area
  - Total: 17.35 km^{2} (6.70 sq mi)

Population (October 1, 2019)
  - Total: 69,687
  - Density: 4,017/km^{2} (10,400/sq mi)
- Time zone: UTC+9 (Japan Standard Time)
  - Tree: Cornus florida
  - Flower: Tulip, Cherry blossom
- Phone number: 052-400-2911
- Address: 1238 Sukaguchi, Kiyosu-shi, Aichi-ken 452-8569
- Website: Official website

Kiyosu (清須市, Kiyosu-shi) is a city in Aichi Prefecture, Japan. As of 1 October 2019, the city had an estimated population of 69,687 in 29,477 households, and a population density of 4,017 persons per km^{2}. The total area of the city is 17.35 square kilometres (6.70 sq mi).

== Geography ==
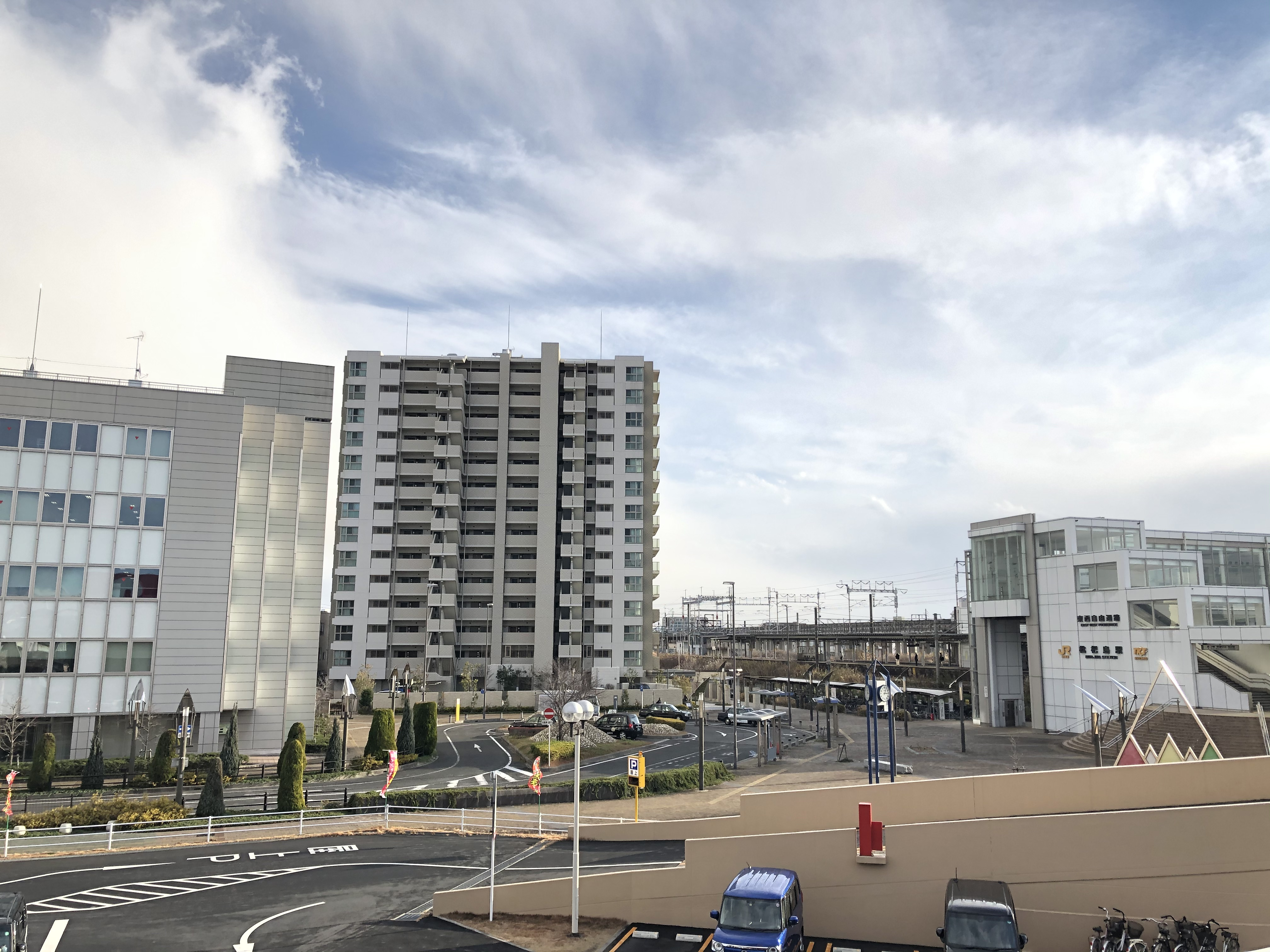
Downtown of Kiyosu

Kiyosu is located in far western Aichi Prefecture, in the western portion of the Nōbi Plain on the Shōnai River. It is bordered by the Nagoya metropolis to the east. Most of the city has an altitude of under 10 meters above sea level.

=== Climate ===
The city has a climate characterized by hot and humid summers, and relatively mild winters (Köppen climate classification Cfa). The average annual temperature in Kiyosu is 15.8 °C. The average annual rainfall is 1688 mm with September as the wettest month. The temperatures are highest on average in August, at around 28.1 °C, and lowest in January, at around 4.4 °C.

=== Demographics ===
Per Japanese census data, the population of Kiyosu has grown steadily over the past 60 years.

Historical population
Year	Pop.	±%
1950	36,294	—
1960	46,433	+27.9%
1970	59,752	+28.7%
1980	61,138	+2.3%
1990	61,578	+0.7%
2000	63,009	+2.3%
2010	65,841	+4.5%
2020	67,352	+2.3%

=== Surrounding municipalities ===
Aichi Prefecture

- Ama
- Ichinomiya
- Inazawa
- Kitanagoya
- Nagoya
  - Nakamura-ku
  - Nishi-ku

== History ==
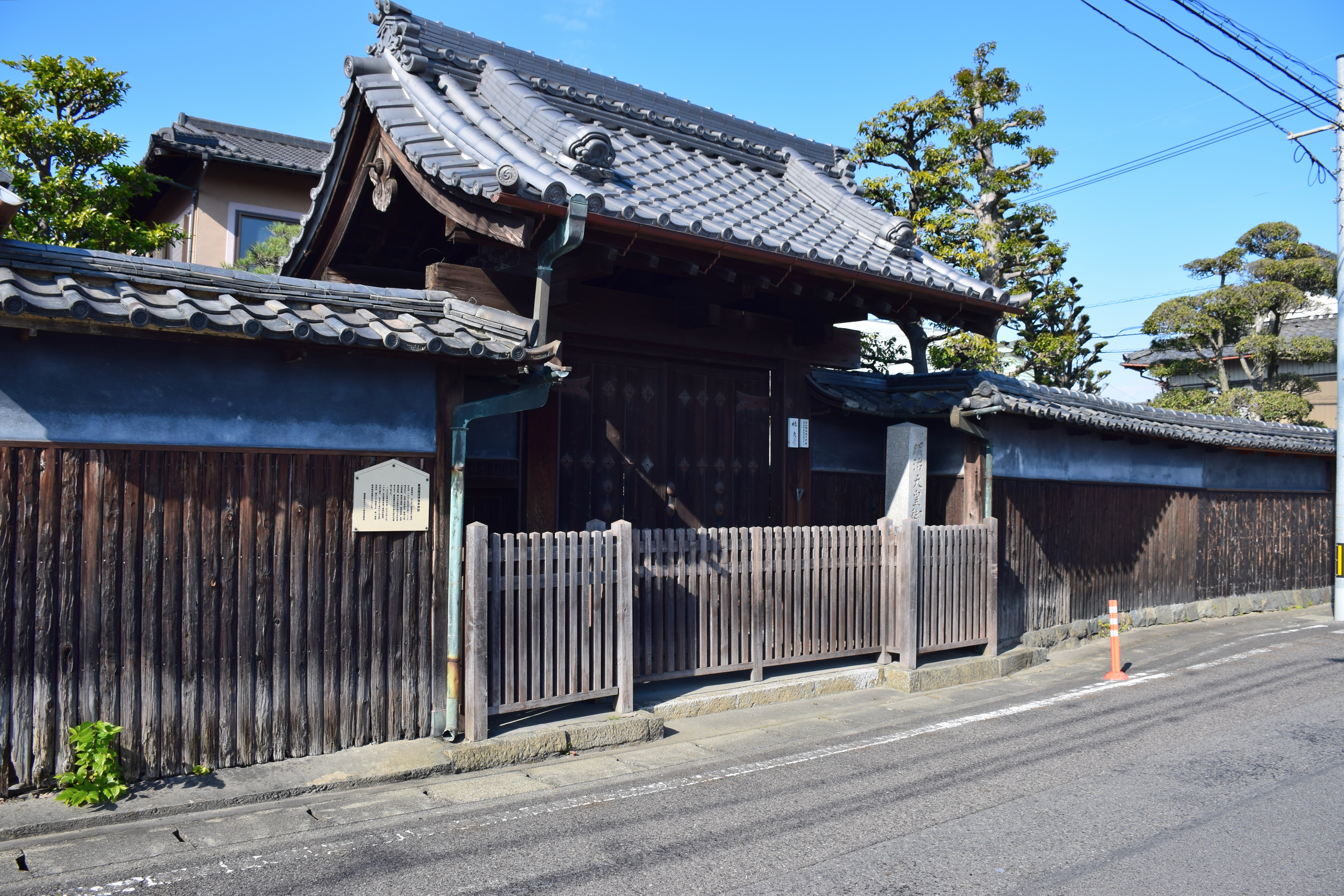
Remains of Kiyosu-juku's honjin

=== Feudal period ===
Kiyosu was the location of a post town (Kiyosu-juku) on the junction of the Nakasendō and the Minoji connecting Kamakura with Kyoto and the Ise Shrine during the Kamakura period.

In the Muromachi period, the area was fortified with the construction of Kiyosu Castle, which subsequently became a stronghold of the Oda clan and the base from which Oda Nobunaga consolidated his control over Owari Province during the Sengoku period.

=== Early modern period ===
After the start of the Edo period, Kiyosu Castle was dismantled by order of Tokugawa Ieyasu, and most of the population relocated to Nagoya.

=== Late modern period ===
By the start of the Meiji period, the area was a rural area organized into villages within Nishikasugai District of Aichi Prefecture. The town of Kiyosu was proclaimed on August 1, 1889, with the establishment of the modern municipalities system.

=== Contemporary history ===
The city of Kiyosu was established on July 7, 2005, from the merger of the former town Kiyosu with the towns of Shinkawa and Nishibiwajima (all from Nishikasugai District).

On October 1, 2009, the neighboring town of Haruhi (also from Nishikasugai District) was merged into Kiyosu.

== Government ==
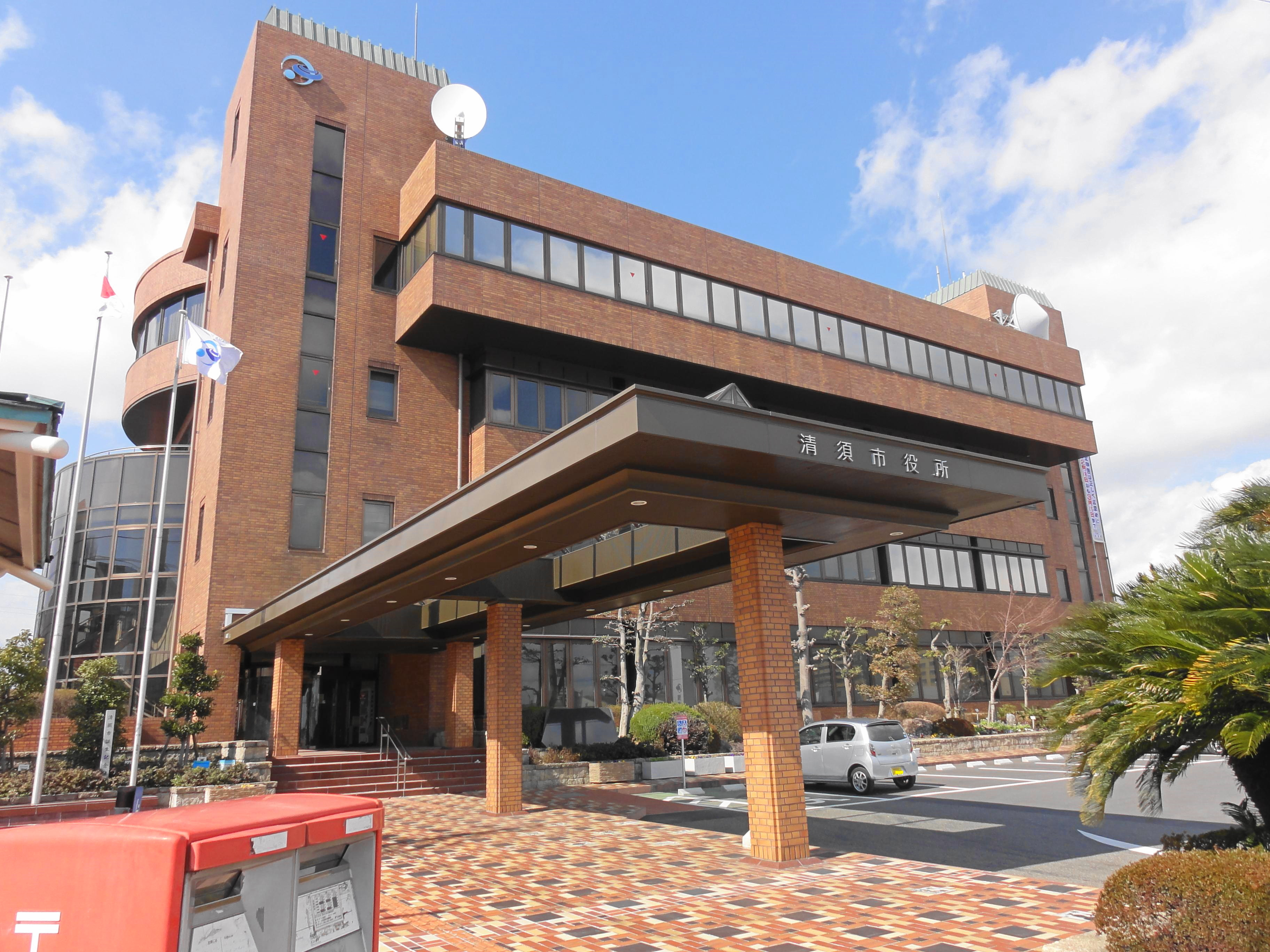
Kiyosu City Hall

Kiyosu has a mayor-council form of government with a directly elected mayor and a unicameral city legislature of 22 members. The city contributes two members to the Aichi Prefectural Assembly. In terms of national politics, the city is part of Aichi District 5 of the lower house of the Diet of Japan.

== Sister cities ==
- Jerez de la Frontera, Andalusia, Spain, since January, 1994

== Economy ==
Kiyosu is a regional commercial center with a mixed economy. Due to its proximity to the Nagoya metropolis, it is increasingly becoming a bedroom community.

== Education ==
=== College ===
The Aichi Medical College for Physical and Occupational Therapy is also located in Kiyosu.

- Aichi Medical College for Physical and Occupational Therapy

=== Schools ===
Kiyosu has eight public elementary schools and four public junior high schools operated by the city government, and two public high schools operated by the Aichi Prefectural Board of Education.

== Transportation ==
=== Railways ===
==== Conventional lines ====
Central Japan Railway Company

- Tōkaidō Main Line：- Biwajima –

Meitetsu

- Nagoya Main Line：- Nishi-Biwajima – Futatsuiri – Shinkawabashi – Sukaguchi – Marunouchi – Shin-Kiyosu –
- Inuyama Line：- Shimo-Otai –
- Tsushima Line：Sukaguchi –

=== Roads ===
==== Expressway ====
- Nagoya Dai-ni Kanjo Expressway
- Route 6 (Nagoya Expressway)
- Route 16 (Nagoya Expressway)

==== Japan National Route ====
- National Route 22
- National Route 302

== Local attractions ==
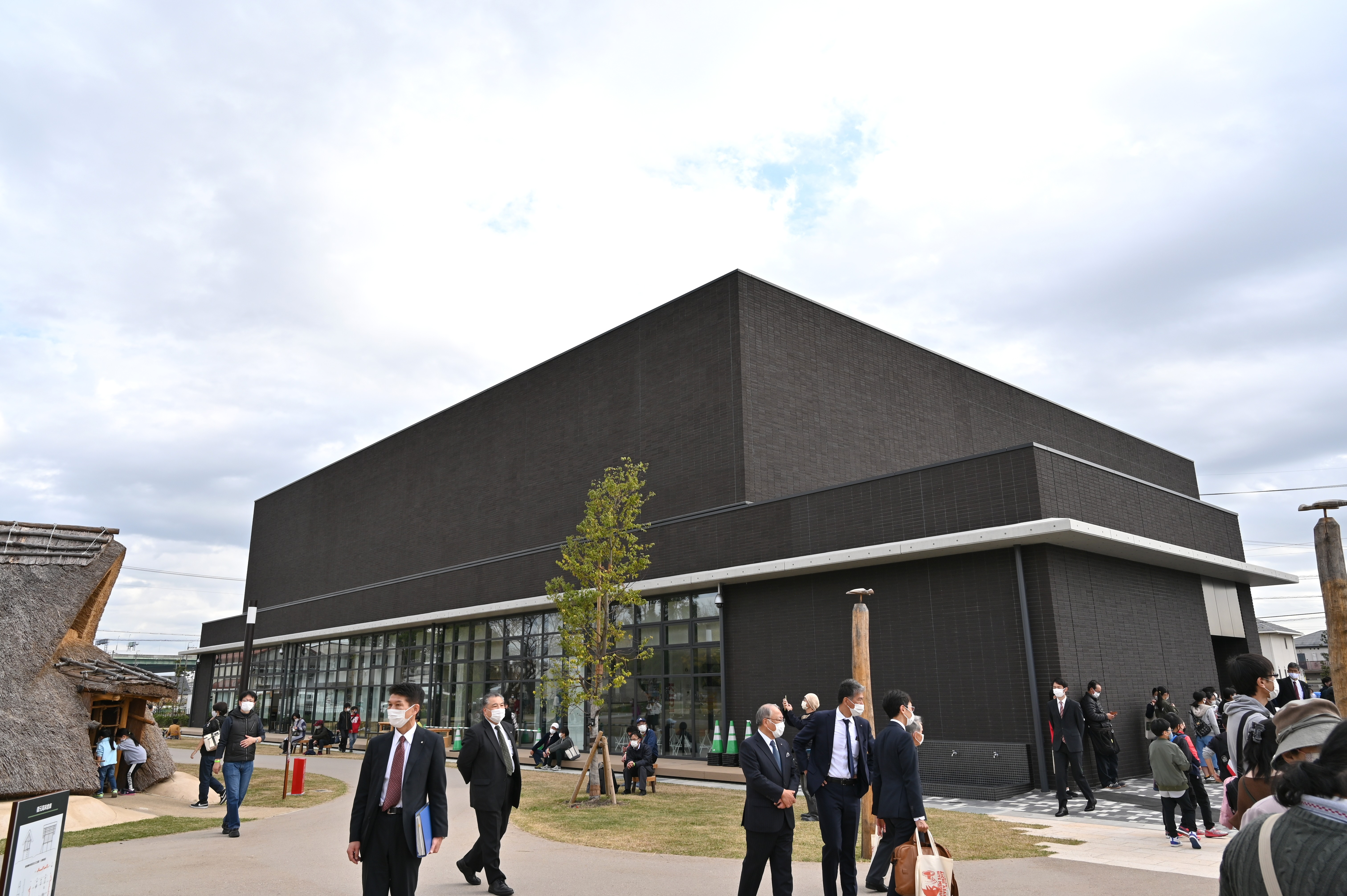
Asahi museum

- Kiyosu Castle
- site of Odani Castle
- Kaigarayama Shell Midden, National Historic Site

== Notable people from Kiyosu ==
- Yoshio Ishida, professional go player
- Ai Kato, actress and model
- Akira Toriyama, manga, game artist and character designer. The creator of Dragon Ball
