= Shima-Ujinaga Station =

Railway station in Inazawa, Aichi Prefecture, Japan

Shima-Ujinaga Station 島氏永駅

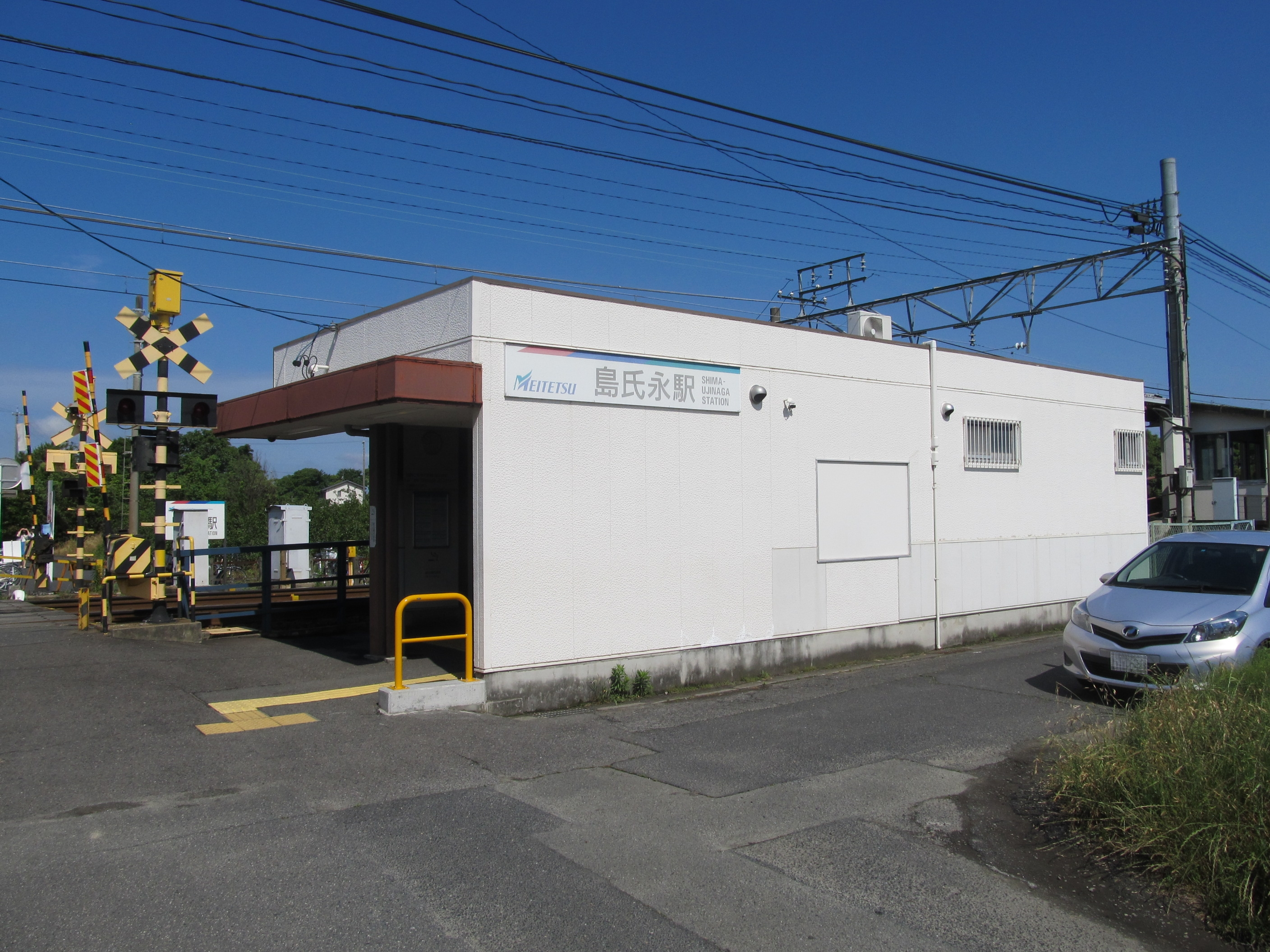
- Shima-Ujinaga Station in June 2014

General information
- Location: Kitaura Shimacho, Inazawa-shi, Aichi-ken 492-8205; Japan
- Coordinates: 35.2709°N 136.8008°E
- Operator: Meitetsu
- Line: ■ Meitetsu Nagoya Line
- Distance: 82.9 kilometers from Toyohashi
- Platforms: 2 side platforms
- Tracks: 2

Construction
- Structure type: At-grade
- Accessible: Yes

Other information
- Status: Unstaffed
- Station code: NH48
- Website: Official website

History
- Opened: February 15, 1924
- Former names: Yamato (to 1930)

Passengers
- FY2017: 1998 daily

Services
Preceding station	Meitetsu	Following station
Kōnomiya towards Toyohashi	Nagoya Main Line Local	Myōkōji towards Meitetsu Gifu
Location
- Location within Aichi Prefecture Location within Japan

Shima-Ujinaga Station (島氏永駅, Shima Ujinaga-eki) is a railway station straddling the boundary between the cities of Inazawa and Ichinomiya, Aichi Prefecture, Japan, and is operated by Meitetsu.

== Lines ==
Shima-Ujinaga Station is served by the Meitetsu Nagoya Main Line and is located 82.9 kilometers from the terminus of the line at Toyohashi Station.

== Station history ==
Shima-Ujinaga Station was opened on February 15, 1924 as two separate stations - Shima station, and Ujinaga station. This was due to a request that the company set up one station in each of the districts the current station straddles.

On January 24, 1924, the stations were merged as Yamato Station (大和駅, Yamato-eki). The station assumed its present name on September 1, 1930.

== Passenger statistics ==
In fiscal 2017, the station was used by an average of 1,998 passengers daily (boarding passengers only).

== Surrounding area ==
- Ichinomiya Kodo High School
- Ichinomiya Yamato Junior High School
- Ichinomiya Yamato Elementary School

== Station layout ==
The station has two opposed unnumbered side platforms connected by a level crossing. The platforms are offset, with one platform in the city of Inazawa and the other in the city of Ichinomiya. The station has automated ticket machines, Manaca automated turnstiles and is unattended.

=== Platforms ===
Westbound	■ Meitetsu Nagoya Main Line	For Meitetsu-Ichinomiya, Kasamatsu, and Meitetsu-Gifu
Eastbound	■ Meitetsu Nagoya Main Line	For Meitetsu-Nagoya, Higashi-Okazaki, and Toyohashi

== See also ==
- List of railway stations in Japan

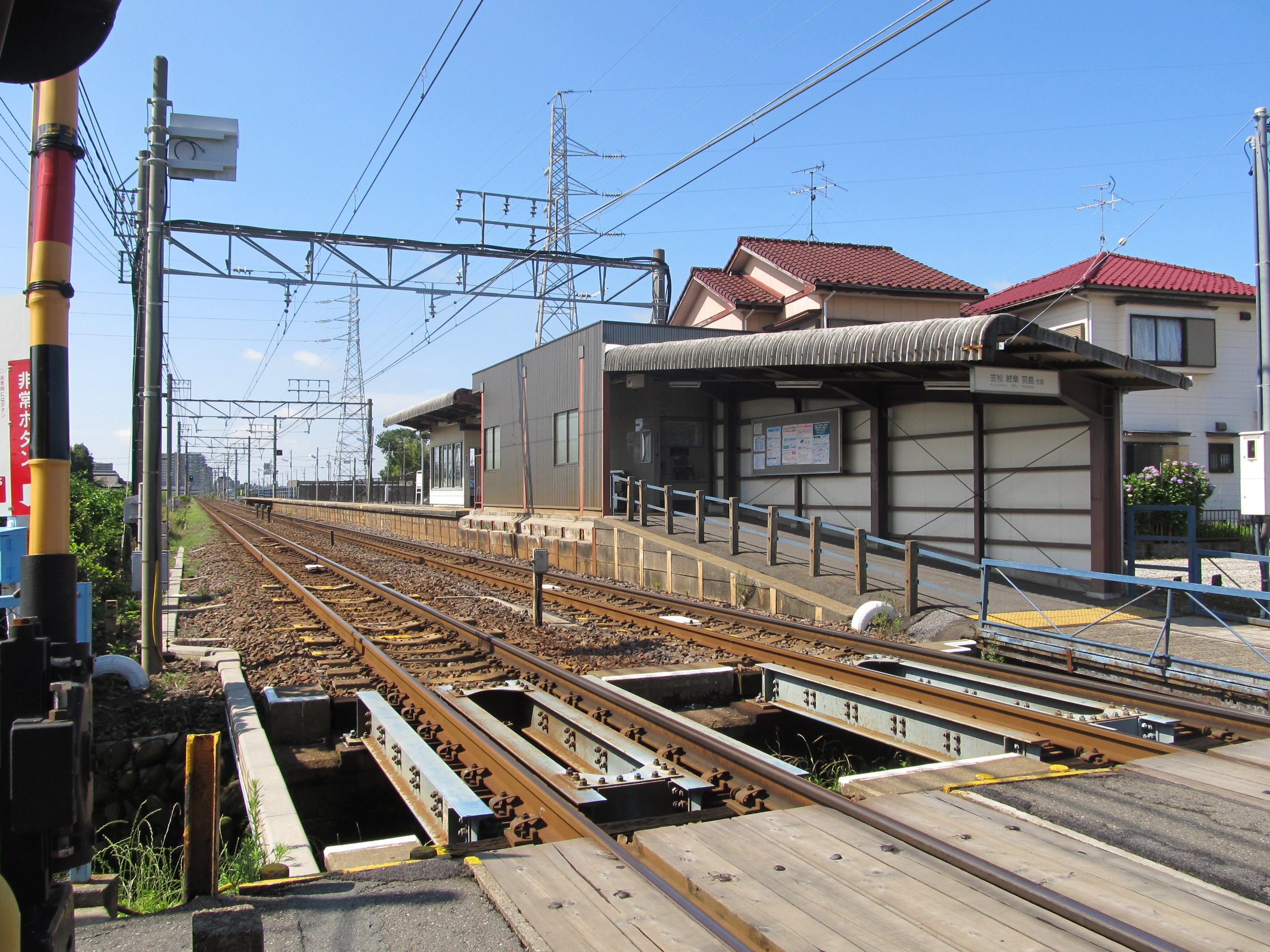
Level crossing
