= Shinkawa, Aichi =

Shinkawa 新川町
- Former municipality
- Flag Emblem

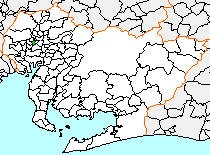
- Location of Shinkawa in Aichi Prefecture
- Country: Japan
- Region: Chūbu
- Prefecture: Aichi Prefectre
- Merged: July 7, 2005 (now part of Kiyosu)

Area
  - Total: 4.70 km^{2} (1.81 sq mi)

Population (2003)
  - Total: 18,761

Shinkawa (新川町, Shinkawa-chō) was a town located in Nishikasugai District, Aichi Prefecture, Japan.

== Population ==
As of 2003, the town had an estimated population of 18,761 and a population density of 3,991.70 persons per km^{2}. The total area was 4.70 km^{2}.

== History ==
On July 7, 2005, Shinkawa, along with the towns of Kiyosu (former) and Nishibiwajima (all from Nishikasugai District), was merged to create the city of Kiyosu.
