= Myōkōji Station =

Railway station in Ichinomiya, Aichi Prefecture, Japan

Myōkōji Station 妙興寺駅

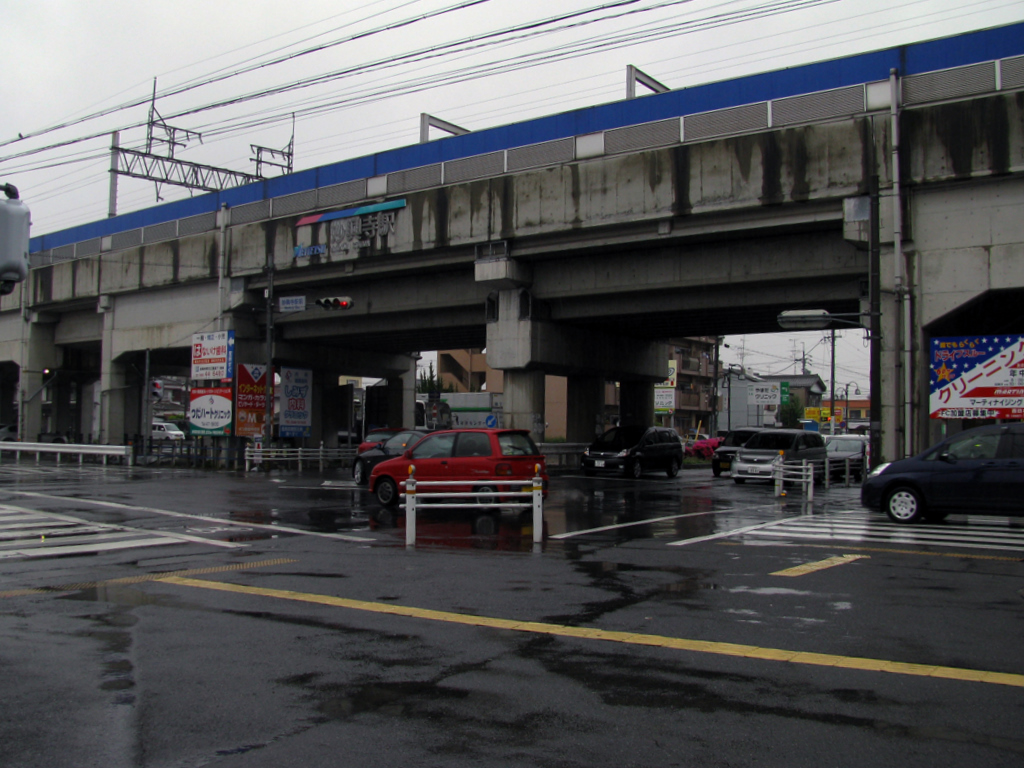
- Elevated station

General information
- Location: Kitauramiyaji Yamato-cho Myokoji Ichinomiya-shi, Aichi-ken 491-0922; Japan
- Coordinates: 35.2870°N 136.7980°E
- Operator: Meitetsu
- Line: ■ Meitetsu Nagoya Line
- Distance: 84.7 kilometers from Toyohashi
- Platforms: 2 side platforms

Other information
- Status: Unstaffed
- Station code: NH49
- Website: Official website

History
- Opened: February 3, 1924

Passengers
- FY2008: 860 daily
Location
- Location within Aichi Prefecture Location within Japan

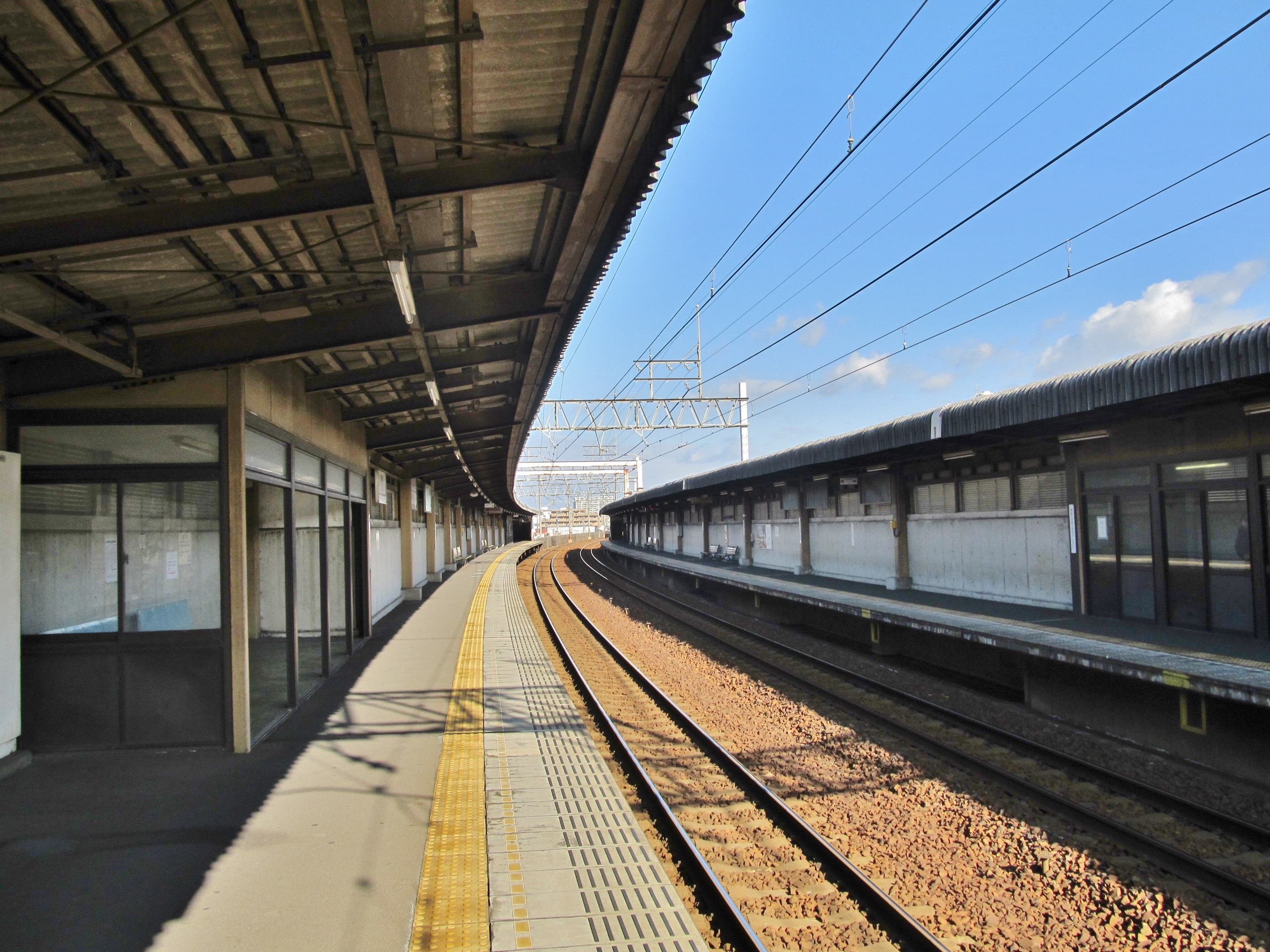
Platforms

Myōkōji Station (妙興寺駅, Myōkōji-eki) is a railway station in the city of Ichinomiya, Aichi Prefecture, Japan, operated by Meitetsu.

== Lines ==
Myōkōji Station is served by the Meitetsu Nagoya Main Line and is 84.7 kilometers from the terminus of the line at Toyohashi Station.

== Station layout ==
The station has two opposed elevated side platforms with the station building underneath. The station has automated ticket machines, Manaca automated turnstiles, and is unattended.

=== Platforms ===
1	■ Meitetsu Nagoya Main Line	For Meitetsu Ichinomiya, Kasamatsu, and Meitetsu Gifu
2	■ Meitetsu Nagoya Main Line	For Meitetsu Nagoya, Higashi-Okazaki, and Toyohashi

== Adjacent stations ==
←	Service	→
Meitetsu Nagoya Main Line
Kōnomiya	Semi Express (Limited)	Meitetsu Ichinomiya
Shima-Ujinaga	Local	Meitetsu Ichinomiya

== Station history ==
Myōkōji Station was opened on February 3, 1924 as a station on the Aichi Electric Railway. On April 1, 1935, the Aichi Electric Railway merged with the Nagoya Railway (the forerunner of present-day Meitetsu). The tracks were elevated in 1993.

== Passenger statistics ==
In fiscal 2008, the station was used by an average of 860 passengers daily.

== Surrounding area ==
- Myōkō-ji
- Ichinomiya Museum

== See also ==
- List of railway stations in Japan
