= Toyoyama =

Town in Nishikasugai District, Aichi Prefecture, Japan

Toyoyama 豊山町
- Town
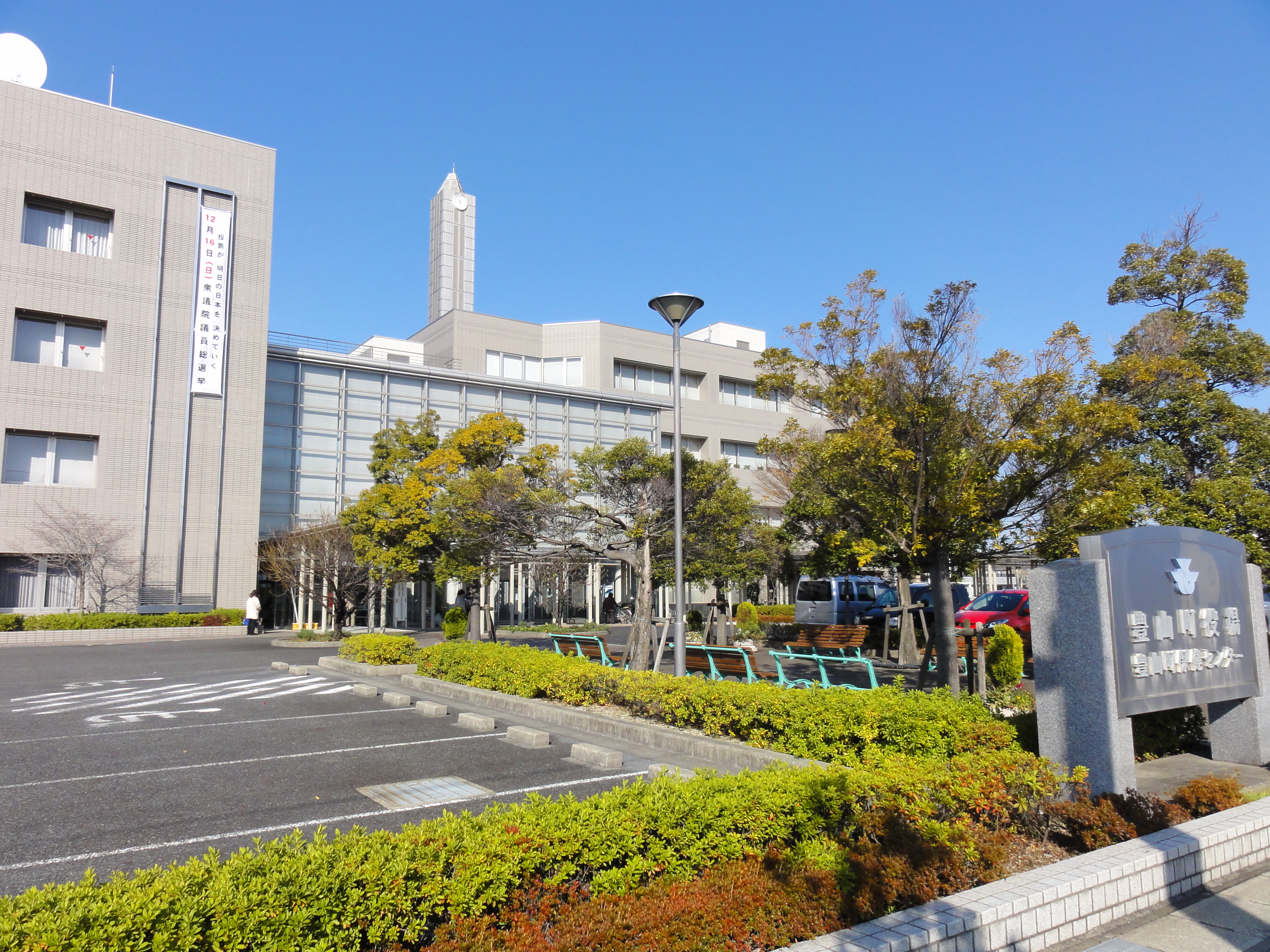
- Toyoyama Town Office

- Flag Emblem

- Location of Toyoyama in Aichi Prefecture

- Coordinates: 35°15′1.8″N 136°54′43.7″E
- Country: Japan
- Region: Chūbu region Tōkai region
- Prefecture: Aichi
- District: Nishikasugai

Area
  - Total: 6.18 km^{2} (2.39 sq mi)

Population (October 1, 2019)
  - Total: 15,630
  - Density: 2,530/km^{2} (6,550/sq mi)
- Time zone: UTC+9 (Japan Standard Time)
- Tree: Castanopsis
- Flower: Camellia sasanqua
- Phone number: 0568-28-0001
- Address: Toyoyama-chō, Nishikasugai-gun, Aichi-ken 480-0292
- Website: Official website

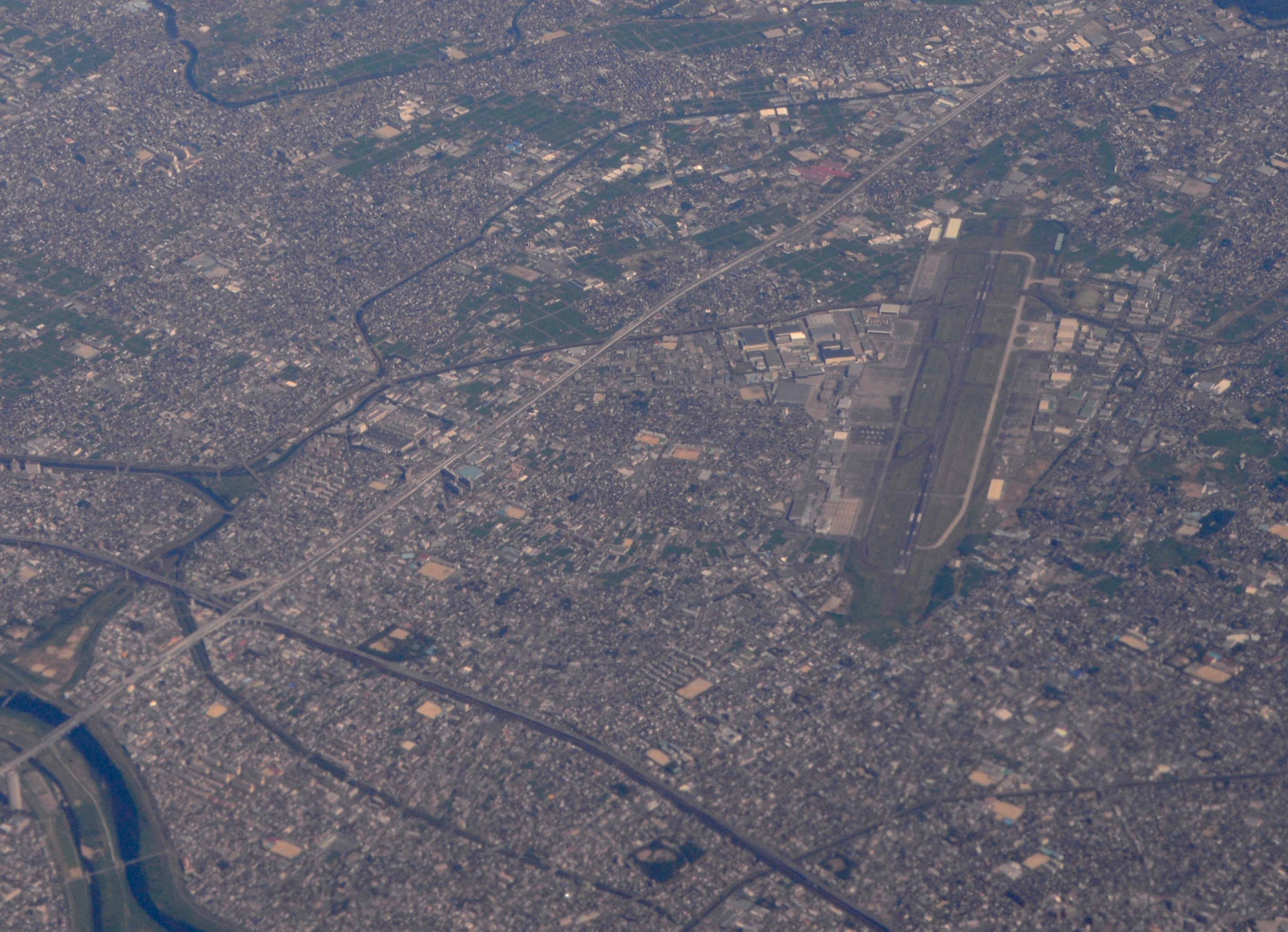
Aerial photograph of Toyoyama in 2019

Toyoyama (豊山町, Toyoyama-chō) is a town located in Nishikasugai District, Aichi Prefecture, Japan. As of 1 October 2019, the town had an estimated population of 15,630 in 6,757 households, and a population density of 2,529 persons per km^{2}. The total area of the town is 6.18 square kilometres (2.39 sq mi).

== Geography ==
Toyoyama is located in the flatlands of central Aichi Prefecture. A third of the area of the town is occupied by Nagoya Airfield.

=== Neighboring municipalities ===
- Aichi Prefecture
  - Kasugai
  - Kitanagoya
  - Komaki
  - Nagoya – Kita-ku

== Demographics ==
Per Japanese census data, the population of Toyoyama has been increasing over the past 20 years.

Historical population
Year	Pop.	±%
1940	3,713	—
1950	4,265	+14.9%
1960	4,612	+8.1%
1970	11,005	+138.6%
1980	13,693	+24.4%
1990	13,213	−3.5%
2000	13,001	−1.6%
2010	14,404	+10.8%

=== Climate ===
The town has a climate characterized by characterized by hot and humid summers, and relatively mild winters (Köppen climate classification Cfa). The average annual temperature in Toyoyama is 15.8 °C. The average annual rainfall is 1713 mm with September as the wettest month. The temperatures are highest on average in August, at around 28.2 °C, and lowest in January, at around 4.4 °C.

== History ==
Aoyama and Toyoba villages were created within Nishikasugai District, Aichi with the establishment of the modern municipalities system on October 1, 1889. The town villages merged to form the village of Toyoyama on July 16, 1906. Toyoyama was elevated to town status on April 1, 1972.

== Economy ==
Mitsubishi Heavy Industries Aerospace Division assembles the Mitsubishi Regional Jet in Toyoyama. Nakanihon Air Service, a general aviation operator, is also located in Toyoyama on the airport grounds. Toyoyama is also home to the Nagoya Central Wholesale Market.

== Education ==
- Toyoyama has three public elementary schools and one public junior high school. The schools are operated by the town government.

== Transportation ==
=== Airport ===
- Nagoya Airfield

=== Railway ===
Toyoyama does not have a passenger railway service.

=== Highway ===
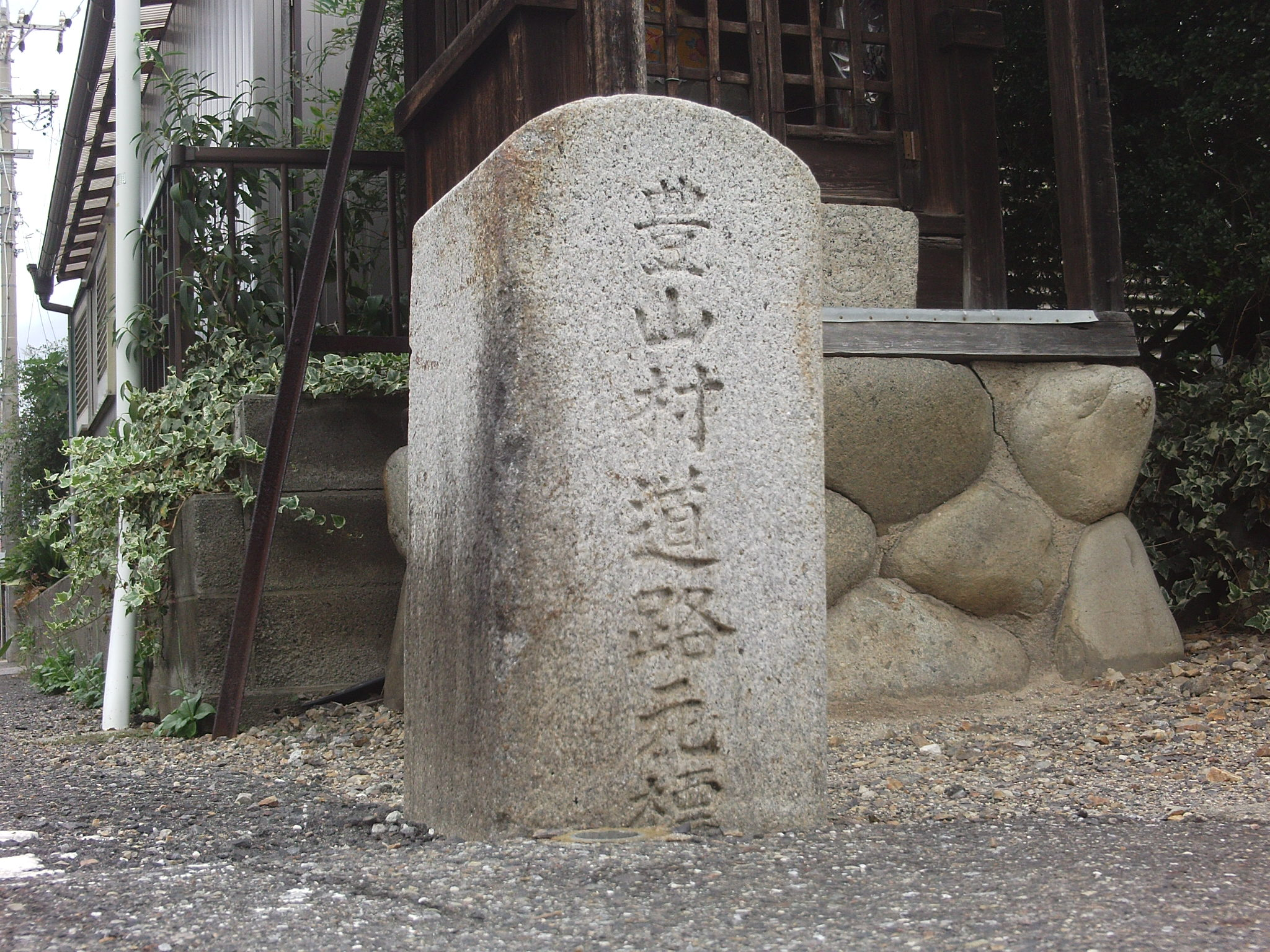
The Kilometre Zero of Toyoyama

- Route 11 (Nagoya Expressway)
- National Route 41

== Notable people from Toyoyama ==
- Tae Honma, professional wrestler
- Ichiro Suzuki, Hall of Fame baseball player.
