= Kiyosu (town) =

Town in Aichi prefecture, Japan

Kiyosu 清州町
- Former municipality
- Flag Emblem

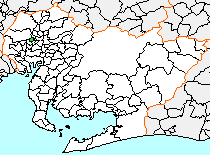
- Location of Kiyosu Town in Aichi Prefecture
- Country: Japan
- Region: Chūbu
- Prefecture: Aichi Prefectre
- Merged: July 7, 2005 (now part of Kiyosu City)

Area
  - Total: 5.25 km^{2} (2.03 sq mi)

Population (2003)
  - Total: 19,409
  - Density: 3,696.95/km^{2} (9,575.1/sq mi)

Kiyosu (清洲町, Kiyosu-chō) was a town located in Nishikasugai District, Aichi Prefecture, Japan.

As of 2003, the town had an estimated population of 19,409 and a density of 3,696.95 persons per km^{2}. The total area was 5.25 km^{2}.

On July 7, 2005, Kiyosu absorbed the towns of Nishibiwajima and Shinkawa (all from Nishikasugai District) to create the city of Kiyosu.

Famed manga artist Akira Toriyama, creator of Dr. Slump and Dragon Ball, was born in Kiyosu town and continued to live in its successor city until his death.
