= Ōsato Station =

Railway station in Inazawa, Aichi Prefecture, Japan

Ōsato Station 大里駅

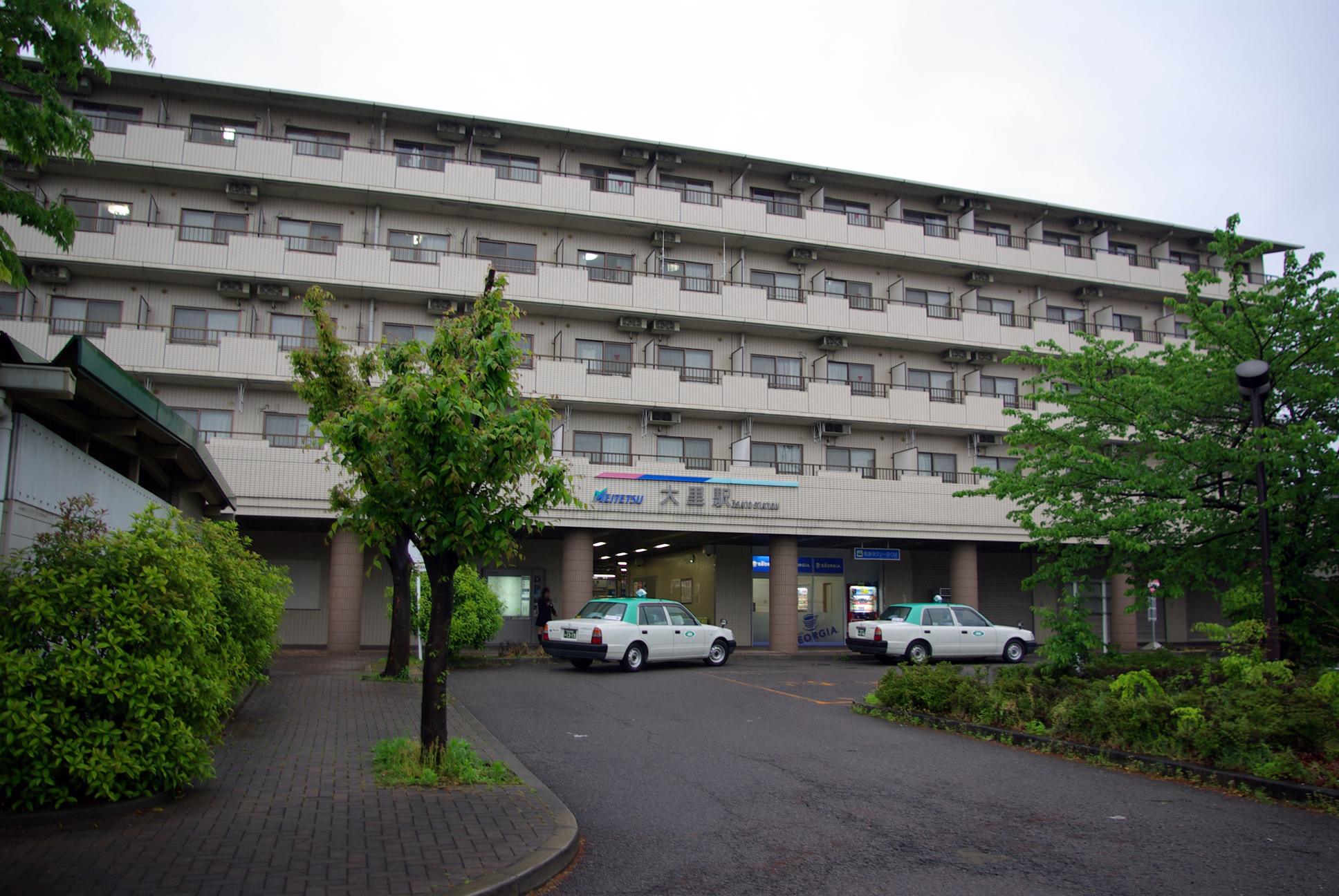
- Station building within an apartment complex, April 2009

General information
- Location: Sanjūbanjin-7133-1 Okudachō Inazawa-shi, Aichi-ken 492-8233; Japan
- Coordinates: 35.2265°N 136.8184°E
- Operator: Meitetsu
- Line: ■ Meitetsu Nagoya Line
- Distance: 77.5 kilometers from Toyohashi
- Platforms: 2 side platforms

Other information
- Status: Unstaffed
- Station code: NH45
- Website: Official website

History
- Opened: February 3, 1928
- Former names: Ōzato (to 1943)

Passengers
- FY2017: 3935 daily
Location
- Location within Aichi Prefecture Location within Japan

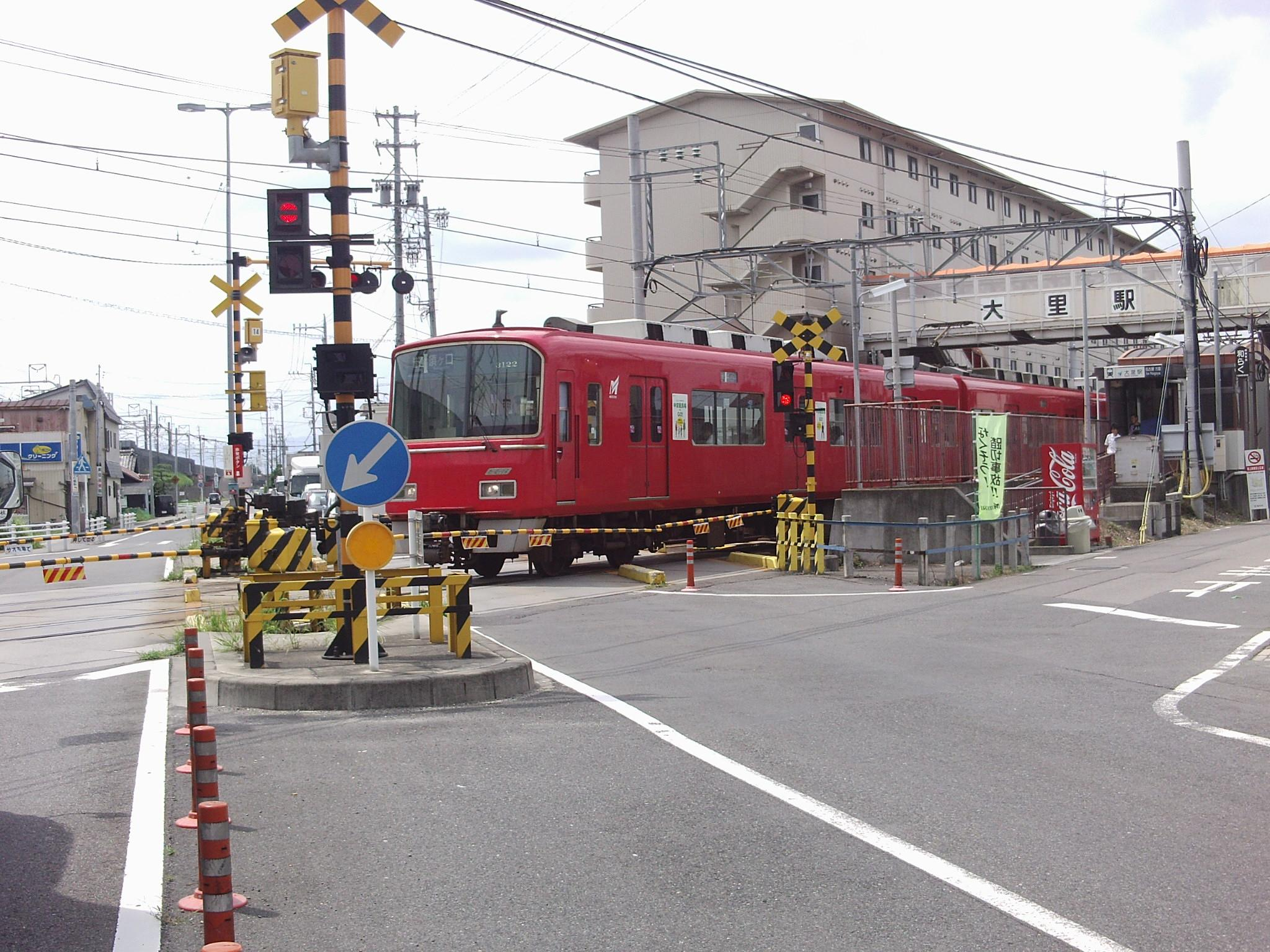
Ōsato Station rear view

Ōsato Station (大里駅, Ōsato-eki) is a railway station in the city of Inazawa, Aichi Prefecture, Japan, operated by Meitetsu.

== Lines ==
Ōsato Station is served by the Meitetsu Nagoya Main Line and is 77.5 kilometers from the terminus of the line at Toyohashi Station.

== Station layout ==
The station has two opposed side platforms, with the station building located on the second story of an apartment complex. The station has automated ticket machines, Manaca automated turnstiles and is unattended.

=== Platforms ===
1	■ Meitetsu Nagoya Main Line	For Meitetsu-Ichinomiya, Kasamatsu, and Meitetsu-Gifu
2	■ Meitetsu Nagoya Main Line	For Meitetsu-Nagoya, Higashi-Okazaki, and Toyohashi

== Adjacent stations ==
←	Service	→
Meitetsu Nagoya Main Line
Shin-Kiyosu	Express (some trains stop)	Kōnomiya
Shin-Kiyosu	Semi Express	Kōnomiya
Shin-Kiyosu	Local	Okuda

== Station history ==
Ōsato Station was opened on February 3, 1928 as Ōzato Station (大佐土駅, Ōzato-eki) on the Aichi Electric Railway. On April 1, 1935, the Aichi Electric Railway merged with the Nagoya Railway (the forerunner of present-day Meitetsu). The station changed the kanji of its name to the present configuration on November 2, 1943. The station has been unattended since February 2004.

== Passenger statistics ==
In fiscal 2017, the station was used by an average of 3,935 passengers daily.

== Surrounding area ==
- Ōsato Junior High School
- Kiyosu Station
- Ōsato Nishi Elementary School

== See also ==
- List of railway stations in Japan
