= Nishibiwajima =

Nishibiwajima 西枇杷島町
- Former municipality
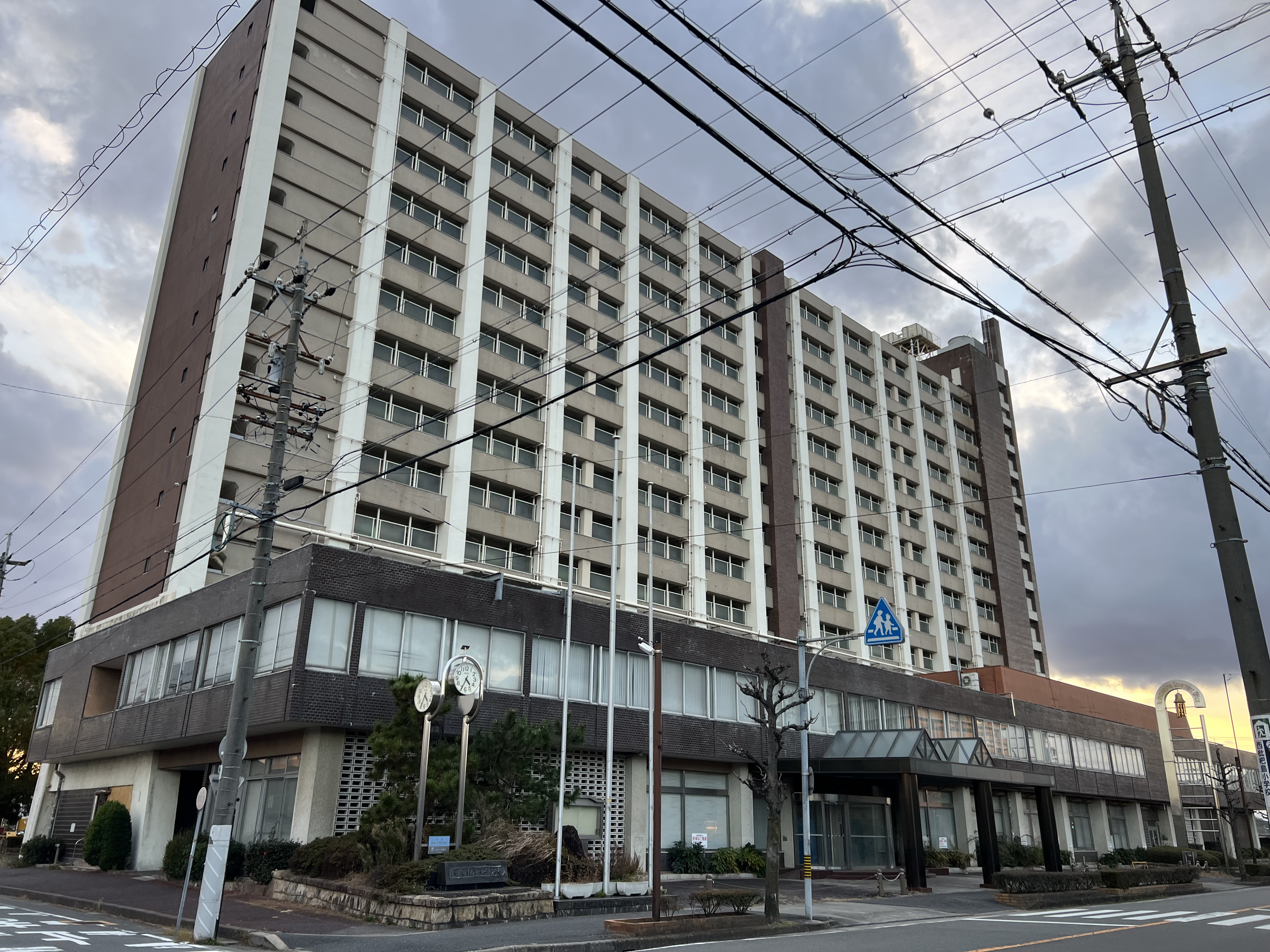
- Former Nishibiwajima Town Office

- Flag Emblem

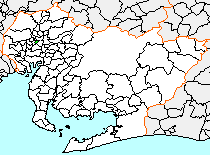
- Location of Nishibiwajima in Aichi Prefecture
- Country: Japan
- Region: Chūbu
- Prefecture: Aichi Prefectre
- Merged: July 7, 2005 (now part of Kiyosu)

Area
  - Total: 3.36 km^{2} (1.30 sq mi)

Population (2003)
  - Total: 16,531
  - Density: 4,919.94/km^{2} (12,742.6/sq mi)

Nishibiwajima (西枇杷島町, Nishibiwajima-chō) was a town located in Nishikasugai District, Aichi Prefecture, Japan.

As of 2003, the town had an estimated population of 16,531 and a density of 4,919.94 persons per km^{2}. The total area was 3.36 km^{2}.

On July 7, 2005, Nishibiwajima, along with the towns of Kiyosu (former) and Shinkawa (all from Nishikasugai District), was merged to create the city of Kiyosu.
