= Nishi Biwajima Station =

Railway station in Kiyosu, Aichi Prefecture, Japan

Nishi-Biwajima Station 西枇杷島駅

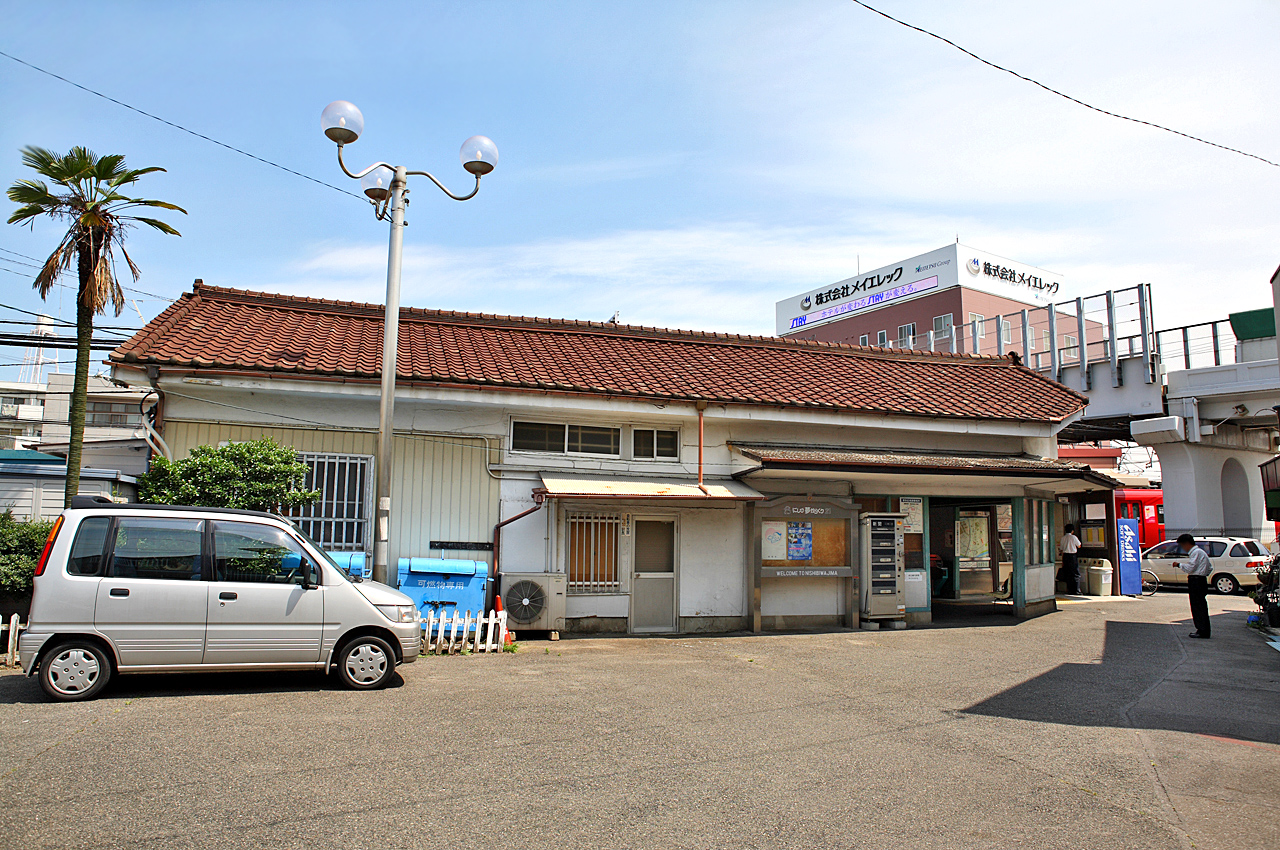
- Nishi Biwajima Station, July 2008

General information
- Location: 37-2 Nishi Biwajima-cho, Kawaguchi, Kiyosu-shi, Aichi-ken 452-0042; Japan
- Coordinates: 35°11′42″N 136°51′55″E
- Line: ■ Meitetsu Nagoya Main Line
- Distance: 71.6 kilometers from Toyohashi
- Platforms: 2 side platforms
- Tracks: 2

Construction
- Structure type: At-grade
- Accessible: Yes

Other information
- Status: Unstaffed
- Station code: NH39
- Website: Official website

History
- Opened: January 23, 1914

Passengers
- FY2013: 830

Services
| Preceding station | Meitetsu | Following station |
|---|---|---|
| Higashi-Biwajima towards Toyohashi | Nagoya Main Line Local | Futatsuiri towards Meitetsu Gifu |
Location
- Location within Aichi Prefecture Location within Japan

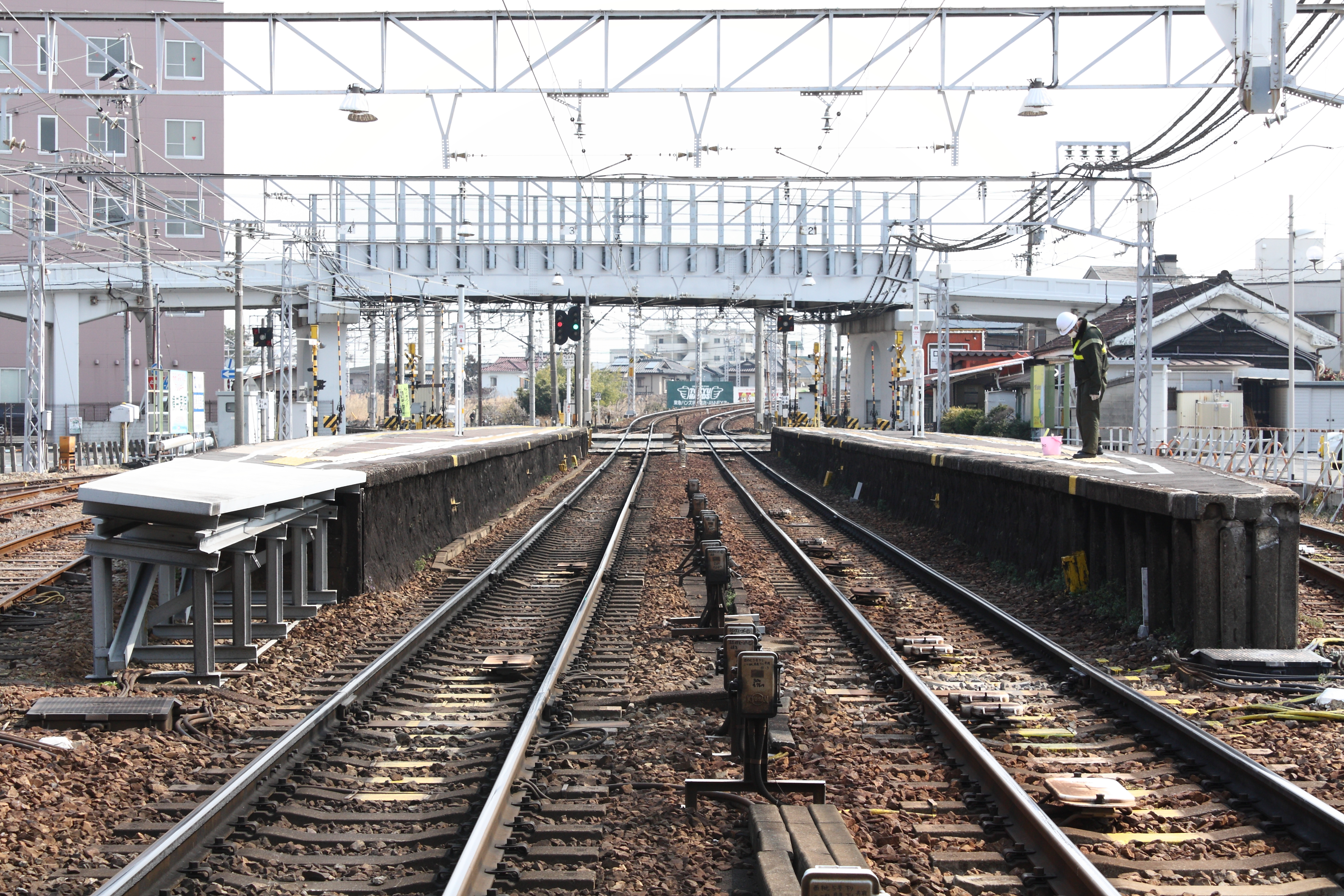
Platforms

Nishi Biwajima Station (西枇杷島駅, Nishi Biwajima-eki) is a railway station in the city of Kiyosu, Aichi Prefecture, Japan, operated by Meitetsu.

== Lines ==
Nishi Biwajima Station is served by the Meitetsu Nagoya Main Line, and is located 71.6 kilometers from the starting point of the line at Toyohashi.

== Station layout ==
The station has two unnumbered island platforms connected by a level crossing. The station has automated ticket machines, Manaca automated turnstiles and is unattended.

=== Platforms ===
| South | ■ Nagoya Main Line | For Meitetsu-Ichinomiya and Meitetsu-Gifu |
| North | ■ Nagoya Main Line | For Meitetsu-Nagoya and Kanayama |

=== Junctions ===
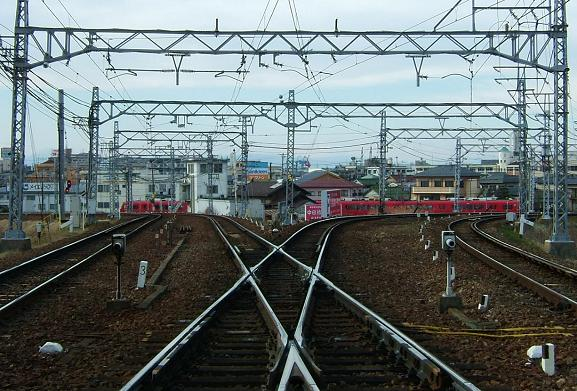
Biwajima Junction as seen from the south, with the Meitetsu Main Line on the left and the Inuyama Line on the right

- Biwajima Junction (枇杷島分岐点, Biwajima Bunkiten), where the northbound Inuyama line diverges from the northbound Main Line
- Shimosuiri Junction (下砂杁信号場, Shimosuiri Shingōjō), where the southbound lines diverge

== Station history ==
Nishi Biwajima Station was opened on January 23, 1914. The station was closed in 1944 due to World War II, and was reopened on August 1, 1944.

== Passenger statistics ==
In fiscal 2013, the station was used by an average of 830 passengers daily.

== Surrounding area ==
- Nishi Biwajima Elementary School

== See also ==
- List of railway stations in Japan
