= Okuda Station =

Railway station in Inazawa, Aichi Prefecture, Japan

Okuda Station 奥田駅

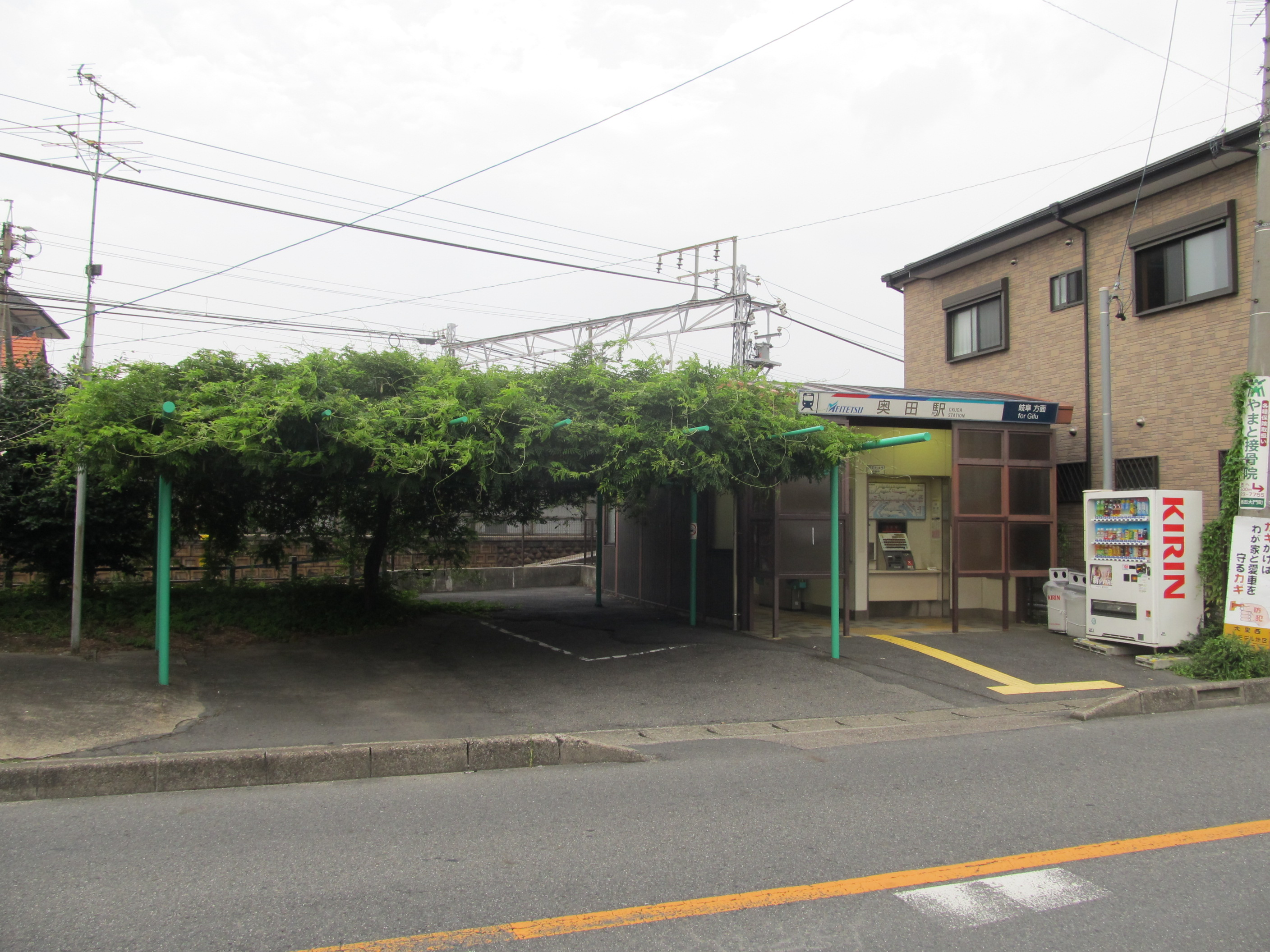
- Okuda Station in July 2013

General information
- Location: Okuda-Daimon-cho, Inazawa-shi, Aichi-ken; Japan
- Coordinates: 35.2352°N 136.8109°E
- Operator: Meitetsu
- Line: ■ Meitetsu Nagoya Line
- Distance: 78.8 kilometers from Toyohashi
- Platforms: 2 side platforms

Other information
- Status: Unstaffed
- Station code: NH46
- Website: Official website

History
- Opened: February 3, 1928

Passengers
- FY2017: 2309 daily

Services
Preceding station	Meitetsu	Following station
Ōsato towards Toyohashi	Nagoya Main Line Local	Kōnomiya towards Meitetsu Gifu
Location
- Location within Aichi Prefecture Location within Japan

Okuda Station (奥田駅, Okuda-eki) is a railway station in the city of Inazawa, Aichi Prefecture, Japan, operated by Meitetsu.

== Lines ==
Okuda Station is served by the Meitetsu Nagoya Main Line and is 78.8 kilometers from the terminus of the line at Toyohashi Station.

== Station history ==
Okuda Station was opened on February 3, 1928 as a station on the Aichi Electric Railway. On April 1, 1935, the Aichi Electric Railway merged with the Nagoya Railway (the forerunner of present-day Meitetsu). On September 26, 2002 the station was the site of a fatal accident (the Okuda incident).

== Passenger statistics ==
In fiscal 2017, the station was used by an average of 2,309 passengers daily.

== Surrounding area ==
- Inazawa Higashi High School
- Mitsubishi Electric Inazawa plant

== Station layout ==
The station has two opposed unnumbered side platforms connected by a level crossing. The station has automated ticket machines, Manaca automated turnstiles and is unattended.

=== Platforms ===
Westbound	■ Meitetsu Nagoya Main Line	For Meitetsu-Ichinomiya, Kasamatsu, and Meitetsu-Gifu
Eastbound	■ Meitetsu Nagoya Main Line	For Meitetsu-Nagoya, Higashi-Okazaki, and Toyohashi

== See also ==
- List of railway stations in Japan
