= Kōnomiya Station =

Railway station in Inazawa, Aichi Prefecture, Japan

Kōnomiya Station 国府宮駅

- Kōnomiya Station in July 2022

General information
- Location: Matsushita 1-1-1, Inazawa-shi, Aichi-ken 492-8208; Japan
- Coordinates: 35.2538419°N 136.8029165°E
- Operator: Meitetsu
- Line: Nagoya Main Line
- Distance: 80.9 kilometers from Toyohashi
- Platforms: 2 island platforms

Other information
- Status: Staffed
- Station code: NH47
- Website: Official website

History
- Opened: February 15, 1924

Passengers
- FY2017: 22,861 daily

Services
Preceding station	Meitetsu	Following station
Meitetsu Nagoya towards Toyohashi	Nagoya Main Line Rapid Limited Express Limited Express	Meitetsu Ichinomiya towards Meitetsu Gifu
Shin-Kiyosu towards Central Japan International Airport	Nagoya Main Line Rapid Express	Meitetsu Ichinomiya towards Meitetsu Gifu
Ōsato towards Toyohashi	Nagoya Main Line Express	Meitetsu Ichinomiya towards Meitetsu Gifu
Ōsato towards Ina	Nagoya Main Line Semi Express	Meitetsu Ichinomiya towards Meitetsu Gifu
Ōsato towards Ina	Nagoya Main Line Semi Express (some trains)	Myōkōji towards Meitetsu Gifu
Okuda towards Ina	Nagoya Main Line Local	Shima-Ujinaga towards Meitetsu Gifu
Location
- Location within Aichi Prefecture Location within Japan

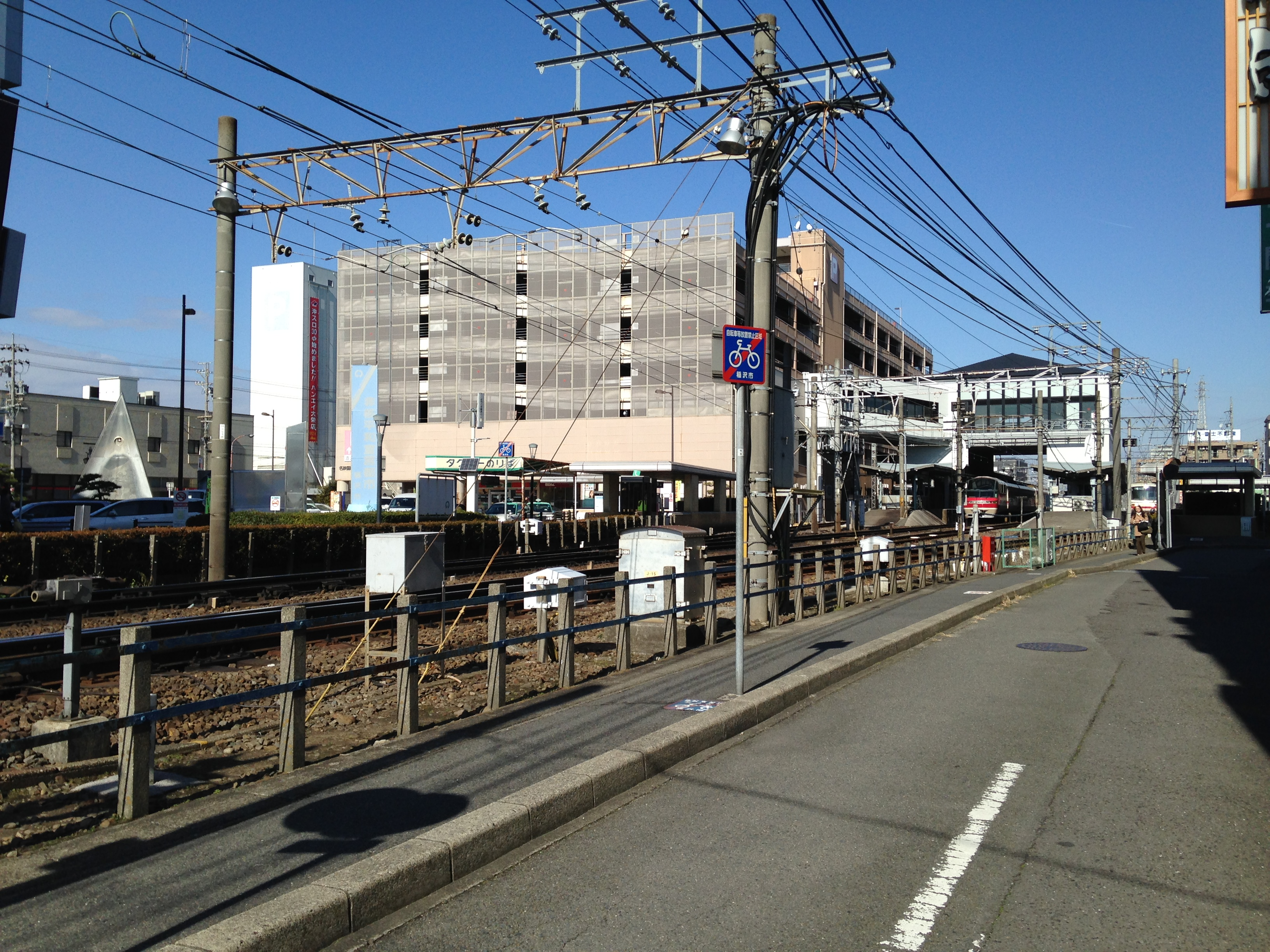
Kōnomiya Station from the southeast

Track diagram

Kōnomiya Station (国府宮駅, Kōnomiya-eki) is a railway station in the city of Inazawa, Aichi Prefecture, Japan, operated by Meitetsu.

== Lines ==
The Meitetsu Nagoya Main Line serves Kōnomiya Station, which is 80.9 kilometers from the line's terminus at Toyohashi Station.

== Station layout ==
The station has two island platforms located on passing loops. The platforms are connected to a footbridge and an underground passage. It is staffed and has automated ticket machines and Manaca automated turnstiles.

=== Platforms ===
1	■ Meitetsu Nagoya Main Line	For Meitetsu Ichinomiya, Kasamatsu, and Meitetsu Gifu
2	■ Meitetsu Nagoya Main Line	For Meitetsu Ichinomiya, Kasamatsu, and Meitetsu Gifu
3	■ Meitetsu Nagoya Main Line	For Meitetsu Nagoya, Higashi-Okazaki, and Toyohashi
4	■ Meitetsu Nagoya Main Line	For Meitetsu Nagoya, Higashi-Okazaki, and Toyohashi

== Station history ==
Kōnomiya Station was opened on February 15, 1924, as a station on the Aichi Electric Railway. On April 1, 1935, the Aichi Electric Railway merged with the Nagoya Railway (the forerunner of present-day Meitetsu). The station building was rebuilt in December 2010.

== Passenger statistics ==
In fiscal 2017, the station was used by an average of 22,861 passengers daily.

== Surrounding area ==
- Nagoya Bunri University Culture Forum
- Inazawa City Hospital
- Owari Okunitama Jinja

== See also ==
- List of railway stations in Japan
