= Haruhi, Aichi =

Dissolved municipality in Aichi prefecture, Japan

Coordinates: 35°14′N 136°50′E

Location of Haruhi in Aichi Prefecture (in red)

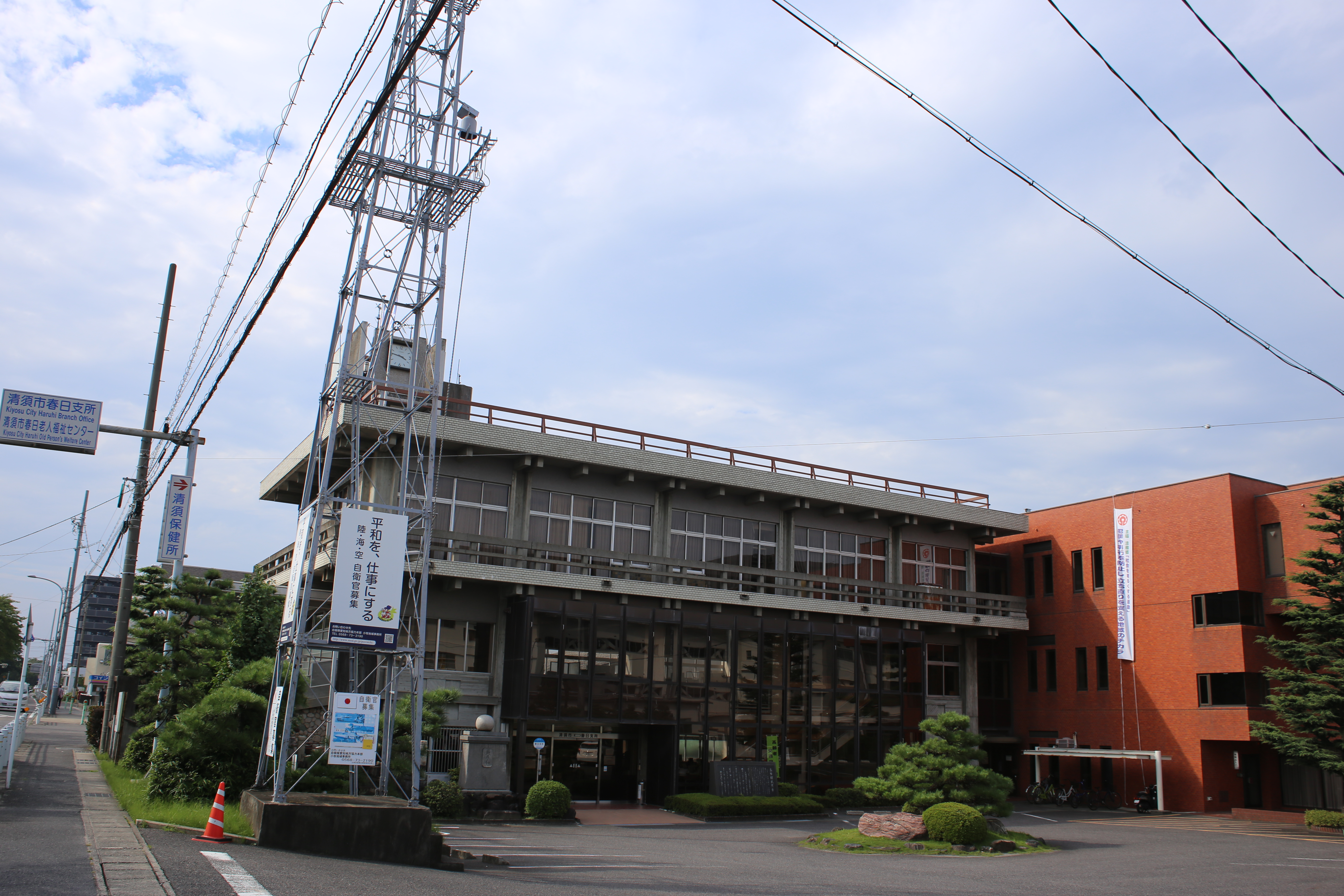
Former Haruhi Town Hall

Haruhi (春日町, Haruhi-chō) was a town located in Nishikasugai District, Aichi Prefecture, Japan.

As of 2003, the town had an estimated population of 8,284 and a density of 2,065.84 persons per km^{2}. The total area was 4.01 km^{2}.

On October 1, 2009, Haruhi was merged into the expanded city of Kiyosu.
