= Nakanihon Air Service =

Aviation company in Aichi Prefecture, Japan

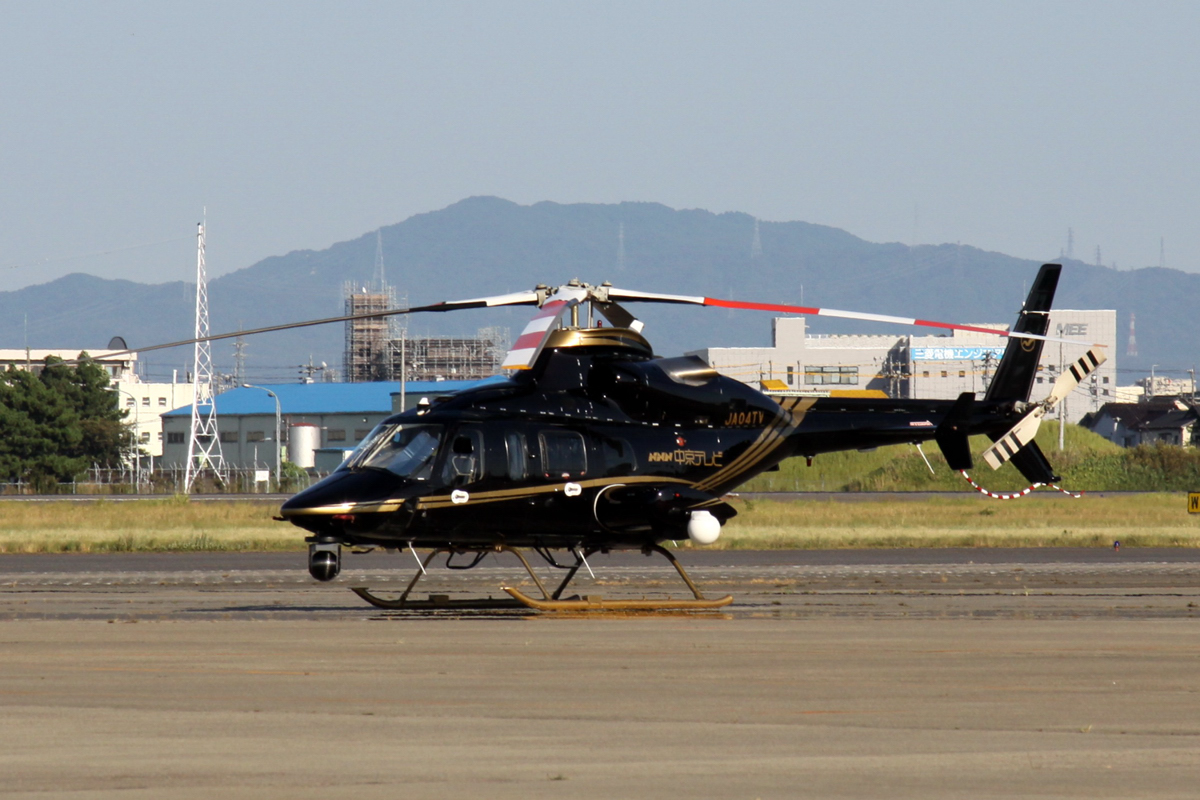
- Nakanihon Air Service Bell 430
IATA	ICAO	Call sign
-	NAS	-
- Commenced operations: 1953
- Operating bases: Nagoya Airport
- Fleet size: See Fleet below
- Parent company: Nagoya Railroad; All Nippon Airways
- Headquarters: Nagoya, Japan

Nakanihon Air Service is a general aviation company headquartered in Toyoyama, Nishikasugai District, Aichi Prefecture, Japan, by Nagoya Airfield near Nagoya.

== History ==
In 1953, Nakanihon Air Service Co., Ltd. (中日本航空株式会社 Nakanihon Kōkū Kabushiki Gaisha) (NAS) was founded near Nagoya Airport (currently Nagoya Airfield). Its major shareholders included Nagoya Railroad and ANA. Its core business has been general aviation, including scenic and charter flights, aerial photography and helicopter services. Its commuter operations were spun off as Nakanihon Airlines (NAL) in 1998 (renamed Air Central in 2005.)

== Fleet ==
- 20 fixed wing aircraft, including Cessna Citation V and Beechcraft King Air
- 60 helicopters
