= Aichi Medical College for Physical and Occupational Therapy =

Higher education institution in Aichi Prefecture, Japan

Coordinates: 35°08′42.84″N 136°57′48.75″E

- 愛知医療学院短期大学
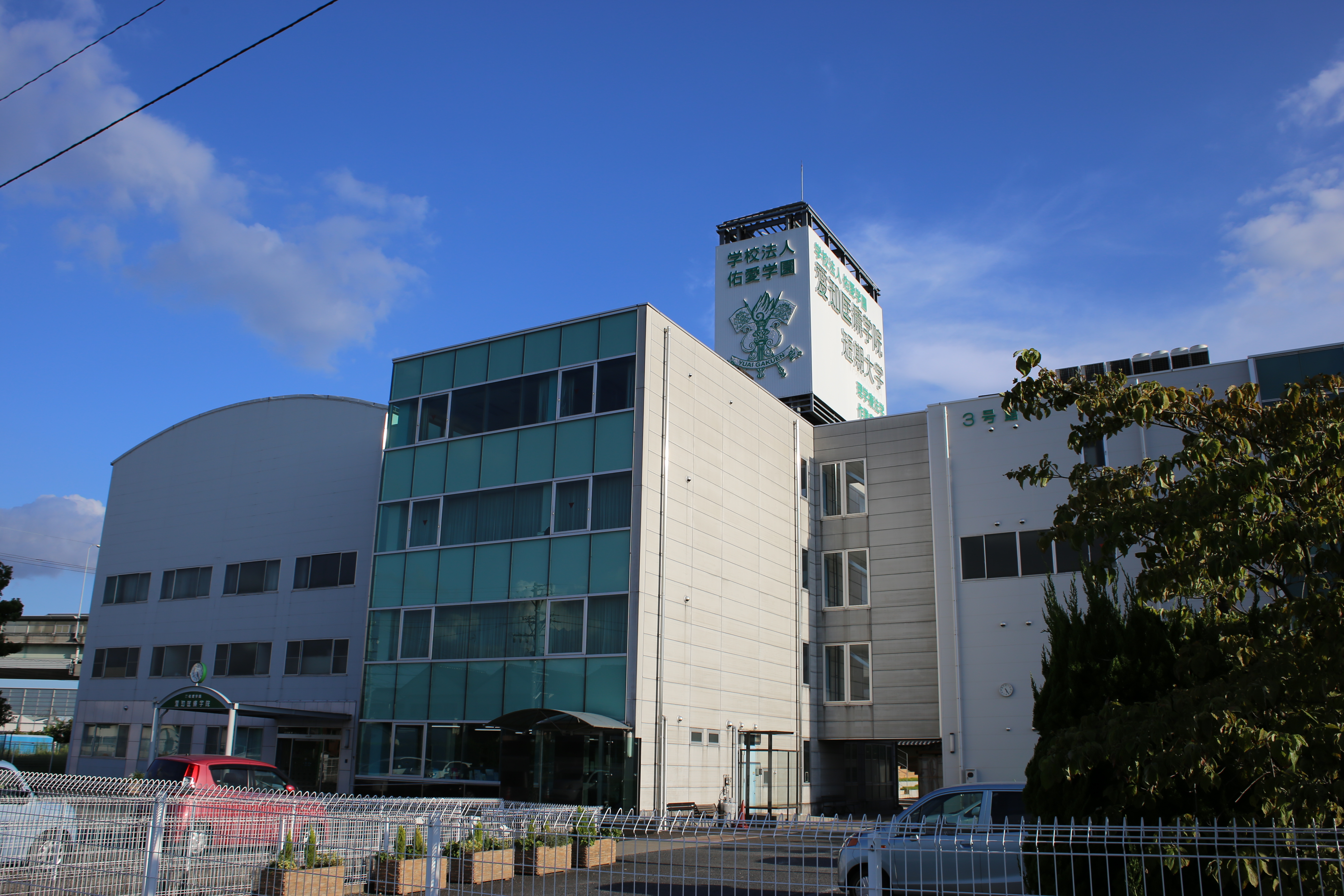
- Type: Private
- Established: 2008
- Academic staff: Rehabilitation; Physiotherapy; Occupational therapy
- Location: Kiyosu, Aichi, Japan
- Website: http://www.yuai.ac.jp

Aichi Medical College for Physical and Occupational Therapy (愛知医療学院短期大学, Aichi Iryō Gakuin Tanki Daigaku) is a private Junior College in Kiyosu, Aichi, Japan.

== Academic departments ==
- Rehabilitation
  - Physiotherapy
  - Occupational therapy

== History ==
- 1982: Vocational school for physiotherapy was set up.
- 1994: Academic department for occupational therapy was set up.
- 2008: Junior College opened in Kiyosu, Aichi.
- 2010: Advanced course for physiotherapy and occupational therapy was set up. Vocational school closed.

== See also ==
- List of junior colleges in Japan
