= Kiyosu Station =

Railway station in Inazawa, Aichi Prefecture, Japan

CA70 Kiyosu Station 清洲駅
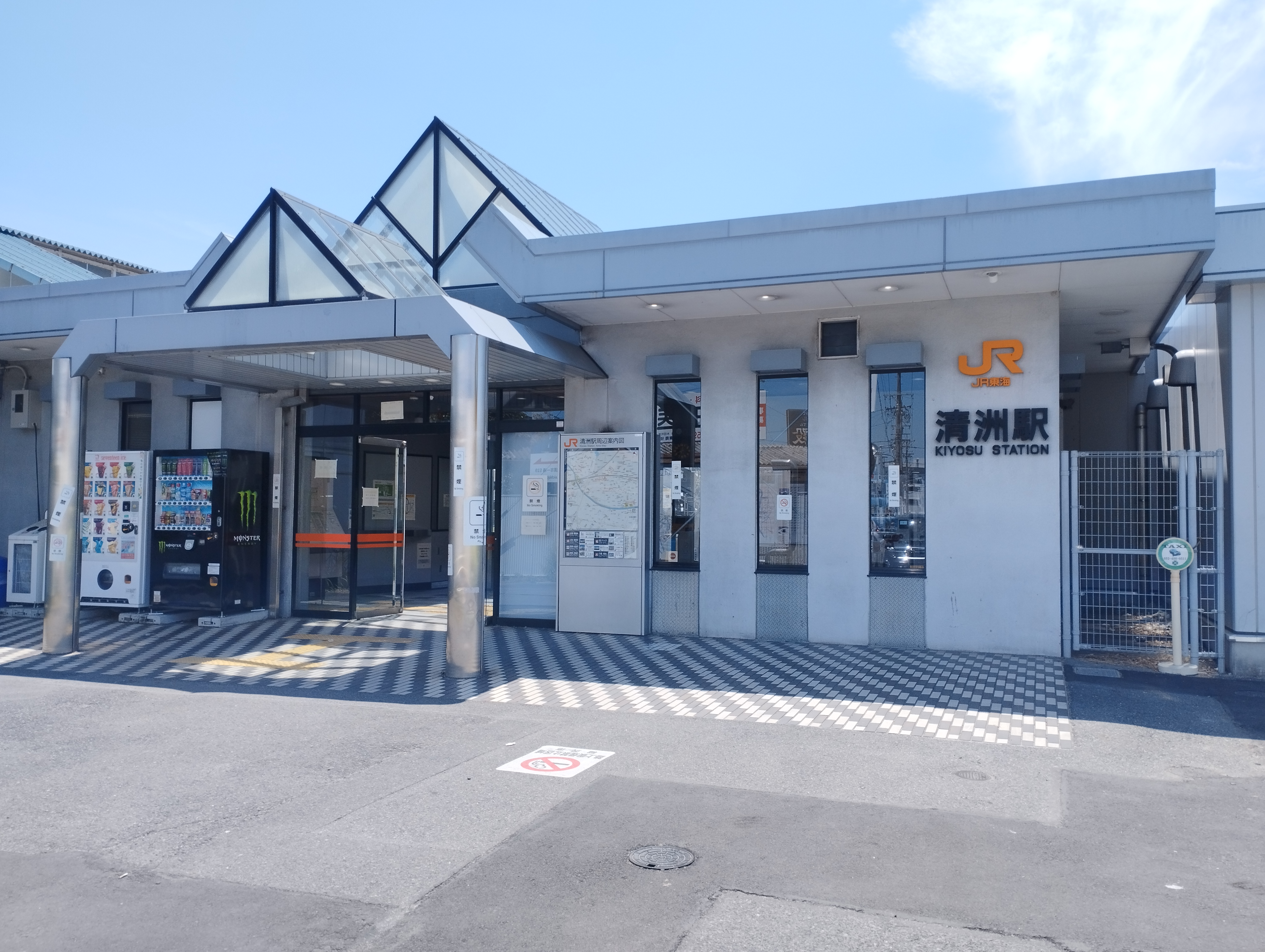
- Kiyosu Station in May 2024

General information
- Location: Kitaichiba-cho 390-1, Inazawa-shi, Aichi-ken 492-817; Japan
- Coordinates: 35.2255°N 136.8343°E
- Operator: JR Central
- Line: Tokaido Main Line
- Distance: 373.8 kilometers from Tokyo
- Platforms: 1 island platform

Other information
- Status: Staffed
- Station code: CA70
- Website: Official website

History
- Opened: February 24, 1934

Passengers
- 2023–2024: 7,790 daily

Services
Preceding station	JR Central	Following station
Inazawa towards Maibara	Tōkaidō Main Line Local	Biwajima towards Atami
Location
- Location within Aichi Prefecture Location within Japan

Kiyosu Station (清洲駅, Kiyosu-eki) is a railway station in the city of Inazawa, Aichi Prefecture, Japan, operated by Central Japan Railway Company (JR Tōkai).

Kiyosu Station is served by the Tōkaidō Main Line, and is located 373.8 kilometers from the starting point of the line at Tokyo Station.

== Station layout ==
The station has an island platform connected to the station building by a footbridge. The station building has automated ticket machines, TOICA automated turnstiles and a staffed ticket office.

=== Platforms ===
1	■ Tōkaidō Main Line	For Okazaki, Nagoya
2	■ Tōkaidō Main Line	For Gifu and Ōgaki

== History ==
Kiyosu Station was opened on February 24, 1934 as a station on the Japanese Government Railway (JGR) Tōkaidō Line. The JGR became the JNR after World War II. Freight service was discontinued in April 1962. Along with the division and privatization of JNR on April 1, 1987, the station came under the control and operation of the Central Japan Railway Company.

Station numbering was introduced to the section of the Tōkaidō Line operated JR Central in March 2018; Kiyosu Station was assigned station number CA70.

== Passenger statistics ==
In fiscal 2017, the station was used by an average of 4031 passengers daily.

== Surrounding area ==
- Kiyosu Castle
- Aichi Medical College for Physical and Occupational Therapy

== See also ==
- List of railway stations in Japan
