= Marunouchi Station (Kiyosu) =

Railway station in Kiyosu, Aichi Prefecture, Japan

Marunouchi Station 丸ノ内駅

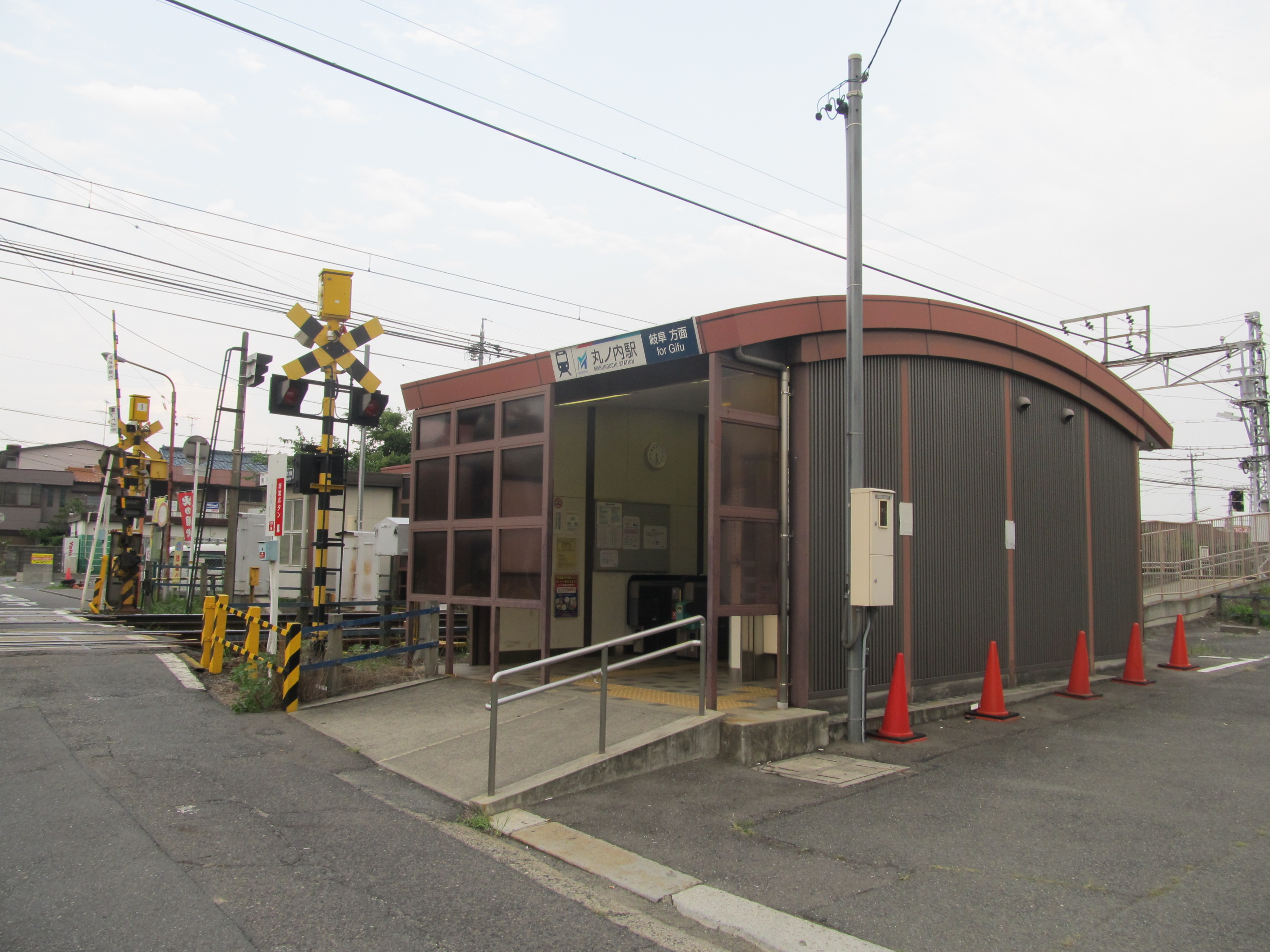
- Marunouchi Station in July 2013

General information
- Location: 1942-7 Kiyosu, Kiyosu-shi, Aichi-ken 452-0942; Japan
- Coordinates: 35.2046°N 136.8417°E
- Operator: Meitetsu
- Line: ■ Meitetsu Nagoya Main Line
- Distance: 74.3 kilometers from Toyohashi
- Platforms: 2 side platforms
- Tracks: 2

Construction
- Structure type: At-grade
- Accessible: Yes

Other information
- Status: Unstaffed
- Station code: NH43
- Website: Official website

History
- Opened: September 22, 1914

Passengers
- FY2013: 854

Services
Preceding station	Meitetsu	Following station
Sukaguchi towards Toyohashi	Nagoya Main Line Local	Shin-Kiyosu towards Meitetsu Gifu
Location
- Location within Aichi Prefecture Location within Japan

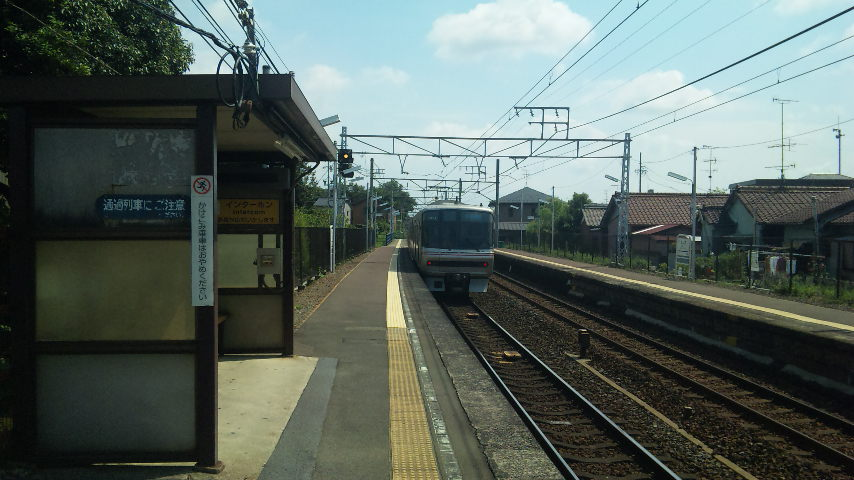
Platforms

Marunouchi Station (丸ノ内駅, Marunouchi-eki) is a railway station in the city of Kiyosu, Aichi Prefecture, Japan, operated by Meitetsu.

== Lines ==
Marunouchi Station is served by the Meitetsu Nagoya Main Line, and is located 74.3 kilometers from the starting point of the line at Toyohashi.

== Station layout ==
The station has two opposed side platforms which are not connected within the station. The station has automated ticket machines, Manaca automated turnstiles and is staffed.

=== Platforms ===
West	■ Nagoya Main Line	For Meitetsu-Ichinomiya and Meitetsu-Gifu
East	■ Nagoya Main Line	For Meitetsu-Nagoya, Kanayama, and Toyohashi

== Station history ==
Marunouchi Station was opened on September 22, 1914 as a station on the privately held Nagoya Electric Railway. The station was closed on June 10, 1944, but was reopened on August 3, 1948. The station became an unattended station from October 1971.

== Passenger statistics ==
In fiscal 2013, the station was used by an average of 854 passengers daily.

== Surrounding area ==
- former Minoji road

== See also ==
- List of railway stations in Japan
