= Motojuku Station (Aichi) =

Railway station in Okazaki, Aichi Prefecture, Japan

Motojuku Station 本宿駅

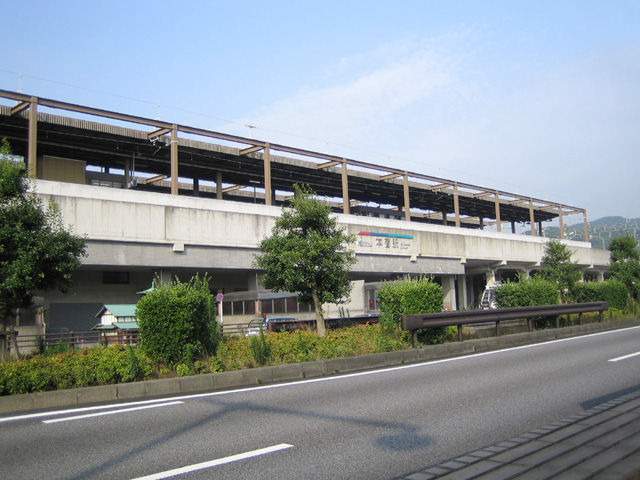
- Motojuku Station in July 2005

General information
- Location: Ichiriyama-30-4 Motojukuchō, Okazaki-shi, Aichi-ken 444-3505; Japan
- Coordinates: 34.8931°N 137.26°E
- Operator: Meitetsu
- Line: ■ Meitetsu Nagoya Line
- Distance: 18.7 kilometers from Toyohashi
- Platforms: 2 island platforms
- Tracks: 4

Construction
- Accessible: Yes

Other information
- Status: Staffed
- Station code: NH08
- Website: Official website

History
- Opened: 1 April 1926; 100 years ago

Passengers
- FY2017: 5,811 daily
Location
- Location within Aichi Prefecture Location within Japan

Track layout

Motojuku Station (本宿駅, Motojuku-eki) is a railway station in the city of Okazaki, Aichi, Japan, operated by Meitetsu.

== Lines ==
Motojuku Station is served by the Meitetsu Nagoya Main Line and is 18.7 kilometers from the terminus of the line at Toyohashi Station.

== Station layout ==
The station has two elevated island platforms with the station building underneath. The station has automated ticket machines, Manaca automated turnstiles and is staffed.

=== Platforms ===
1, 2	■ Nagoya Main Line	For Higashi Okazaki and Meitetsu Nagoya
3, 4	■ Nagoya Main Line	For Toyohashi and Toyokawa-inari

== Adjacent stations ==
←	Service	→
Meitetsu Nagoya Main Line
Kō	Express (急行)	Miai
Kō	Semi Express (準急)	Fujikawa
Meiden Nagasawa	Local (普通)	Meiden Yamanaka

== Station history ==
Motojuku Station was opened on 1 April 1926, as a station on the privately held Aichi Electric Railway. The Aichi Electric Railway was acquired by the Meitetsu Group on 1 August 1935. The station platforms and tracks were elevated on 24 October 1992.

== Passenger statistics ==
In fiscal 2017, the station was used by an average of 5,811 passengers daily.

== Surrounding area ==
- University of Human Environments
- Motojuku Elementary School
- Honmichi Central (Chūbu) branch (中部出張所)
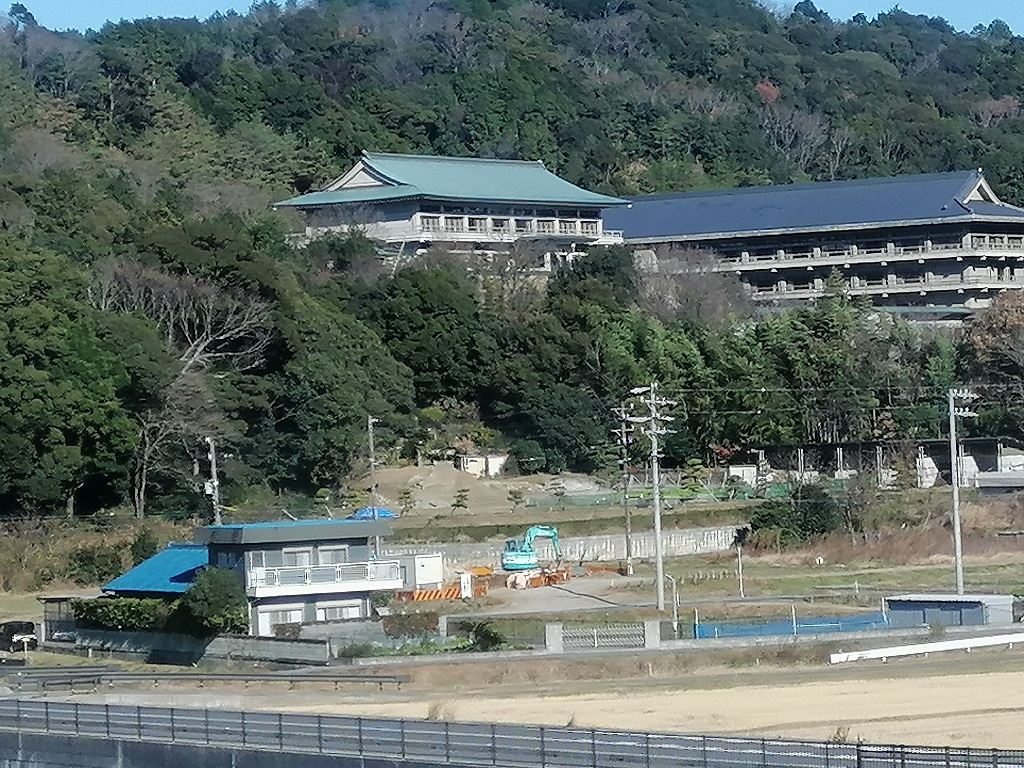
Honmichi Central (Chūbu) branch in Okazaki as seen from a train

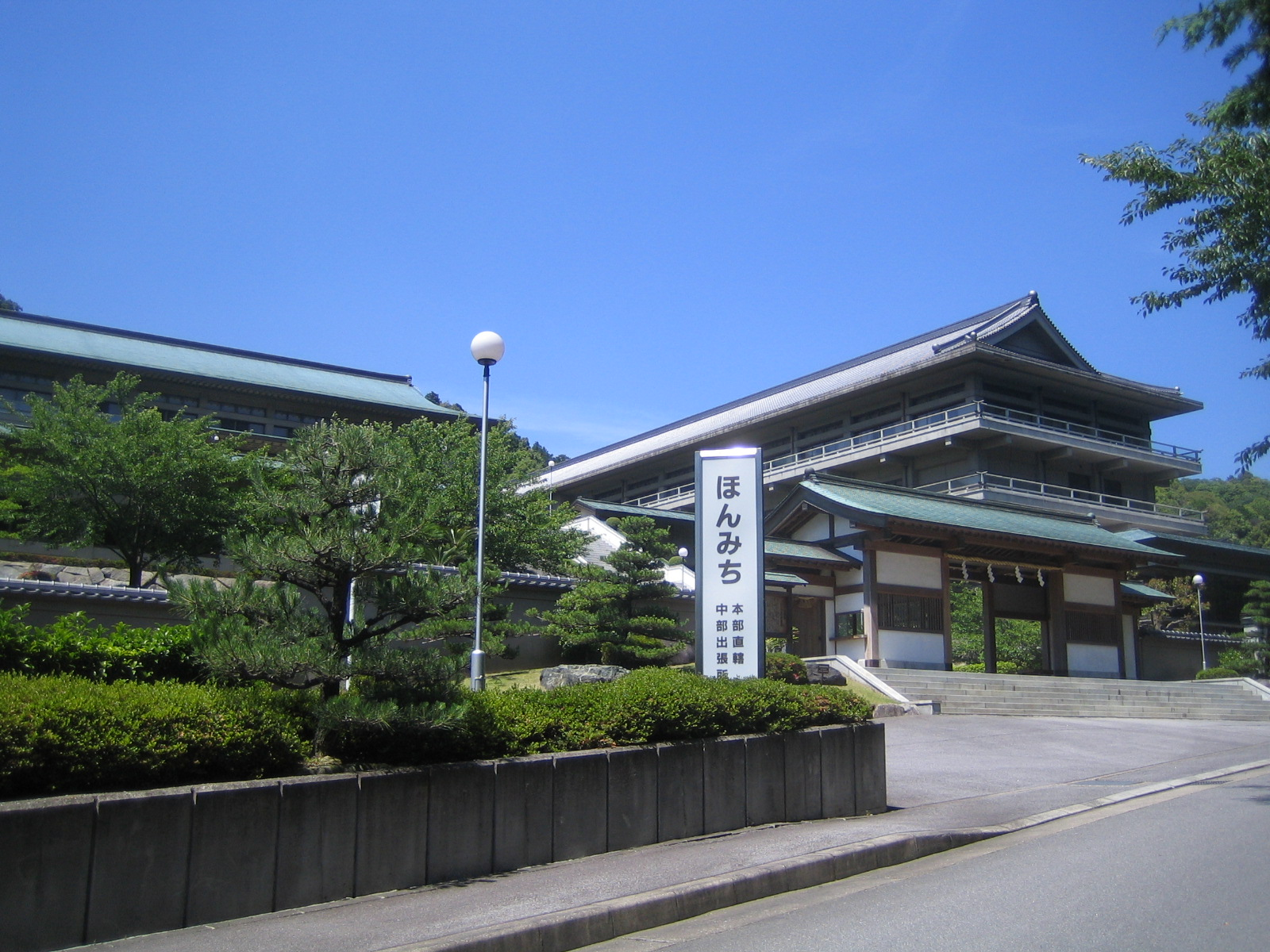
Honmichi Central (Chūbu) branch in Okazaki

== See also ==
- List of railway stations in Japan
