= Meiden Yamanaka Station =

Railway station in Okazaki, Aichi Prefecture, Japan

Meiden Yamanaka Station 名電山中駅

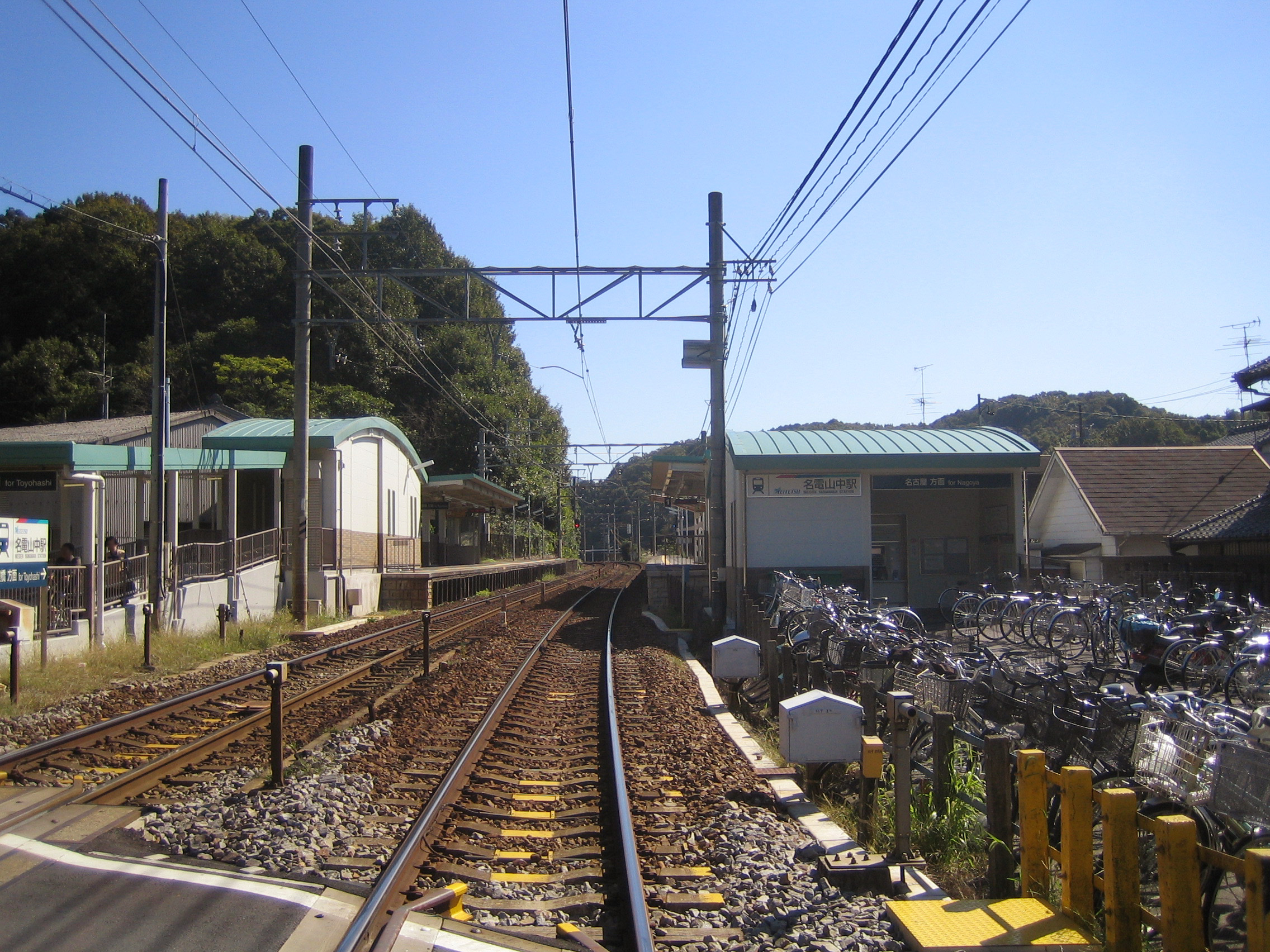
- Meiden Yamanaka Station in October 2006

General information
- Location: Yamanakamachi-62 Maigichō, Okazaki-shi, Aichi-ken 444-3511; Japan
- Coordinates: 34.8996°N 137.2428°E
- Operator: Meitetsu
- Line: ■ Meitetsu Nagoya Line
- Distance: 20.4 kilometers from Toyohashi
- Platforms: 2 side platforms
- Tracks: 2

Construction
- Structure type: At-grade
- Accessible: Yes

Other information
- Status: Unstaffed
- Station code: NH09
- Website: Official website

History
- Opened: 1 April 1926; 100 years ago
- Former names: Aiden Yamanaka (until 1938)

Passengers
- FY2017: 452 daily

Services
Preceding station	Meitetsu	Following station
Motojuku towards Toyohashi	Nagoya Main Line Local	Fujikawa towards Meitetsu Gifu
Location
- Location within Aichi Prefecture Location within Japan

Meiden Yamanaka Station (名電山中駅, Meiden Yamanaka-eki) is a railway station in the city of Okazaki, Aichi, Japan, operated by Meitetsu.

== Lines ==
Meiden Yamanaka Station is served by the Meitetsu Nagoya Main Line and is 20.4 kilometers from the terminus of the line at Toyohashi Station.

== Station layout ==
The station has two opposed side platforms. The station has automated ticket machines, Manaca automated turnstiles and is unattended.

=== Platforms ===
1	■ Nagoya Main Line	For Higashi Okazaki and Meitetsu Nagoya
2	■ Nagoya Main Line	For Toyohashi and Toyokawa-inari

== Station history ==
Meiden Yamanaka Station was opened on 1 April 1926 as Aiden Yamanaka Station (愛電山中駅) on the privately held Aichi Electric Railway. The Aichi Electric Railway was acquired by the Meitetsu Group on 1 August 1935. The station received its present name on 1 December 1938. The station platforms and tracks were elevated on 24 October 1992.

== Passenger statistics ==
In fiscal 2017, the station was used by an average of 452 passengers daily.

== Surrounding area ==
- Japan National Route 1
- Yamanaka Elementary School

== See also ==
- List of railway stations in Japan
