= Sakō Station =

Railway station in Nagoya, Japan

Coordinates: 35.1837°N 136.8729°E

Sakō Station 栄生駅

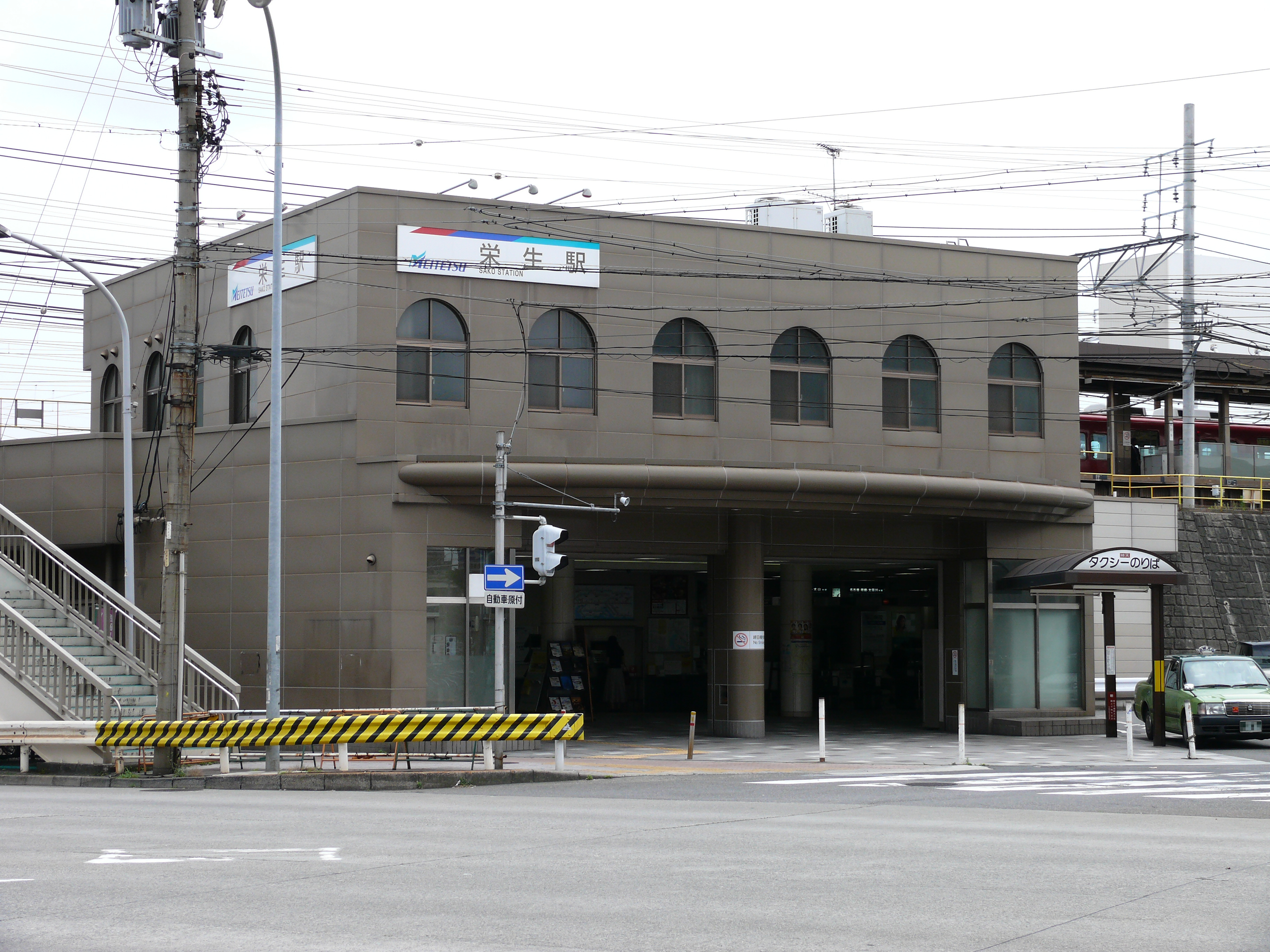
- Entrance

General information
- Location: Sakō 2-5-11, Nishi, Nagoya, Aichi （愛知県名古屋市西区栄生二丁目5-11） Japan
- Operator: Nagoya Railroad
- Line: Meitetsu Nagoya Main Line
- Connections: Bus stop

History
- Opened: 1941

Passengers
- 2006: 1,757,021
Location

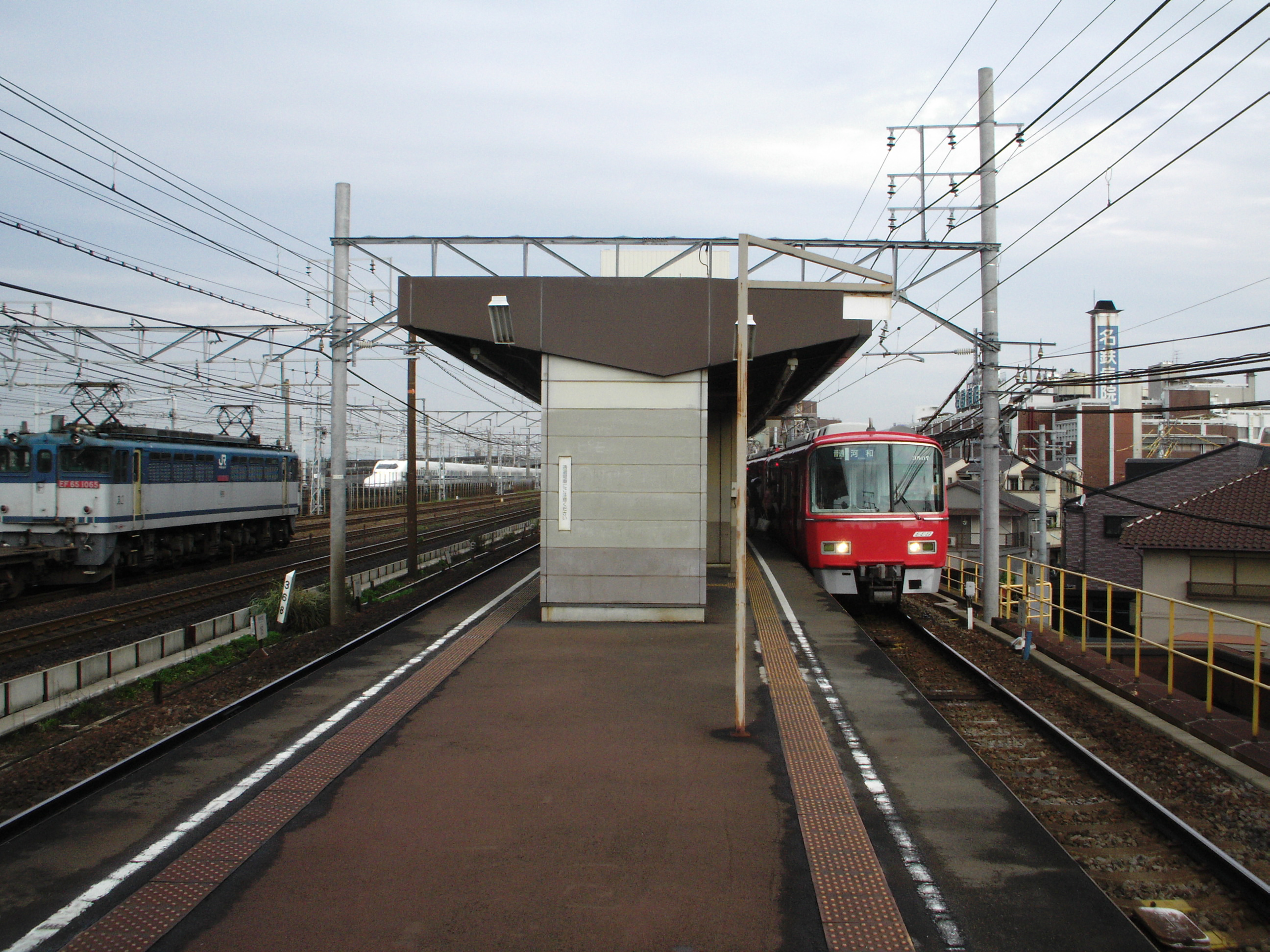
Platform

Sakō Station (栄生駅, Sakō-eki) is a railway station in Nishi-ku, Nagoya, Aichi, Japan. The station provides access to Meitetsu Hospital.

== Line ==
- Nagoya Railroad
  - Meitetsu Nagoya Main Line

Passengers can change trains between the Nagoya Main Line and the Inuyama Line.

== Layout ==
Sakō Station has one island platform serving two tracks.

=== Platform ===
1	■ Nagoya Main Line	for Sukaguchi, Ichinomiya and Gifu
1	■ Inuyama Line; Hiromi Line	for Inuyama, Shin Unuma and Shin Kani
1	■ Tsushima Line; Bisai Line	for Tsushima, Saya and Yatomi
2	■ Nagoya Main Line	for Nagoya, Higashi-Okazaki and Toyohashi
2	■ Toyokawa Line	for Toyokawa-Inari
2	■ Nishio Line	for Nishio and Kira-Yoshida
2	■ Tokoname Line; Airport Line	for Otagawa and Central Japan International Airport
2	■ Kowa Line; Chita New Line	for Kowa and Utsumi

== Adjacent stations ==
←	Service	→
Meitetsu Nagoya Main Line
Meitetsu-Nagoya	Express	Futatsuiri (limited stop on weekdays); Sukaguchi
Meitetsu-Nagoya	Express (for Inuyama Line)	Shimo-Otai; Kami-Otai
Meitetsu-Nagoya	Semi Express	Futatsuiri
Meitetsu-Nagoya	Semi Express (For Inuyama Line)	Kami-Otai
Meitetsu-Nagoya	Local	Higashi-Biwajima
