= Odabuchi Station =

Railway station in Toyokawa, Aichi Prefecture, Japan

Odabuchi Station 小田渕駅

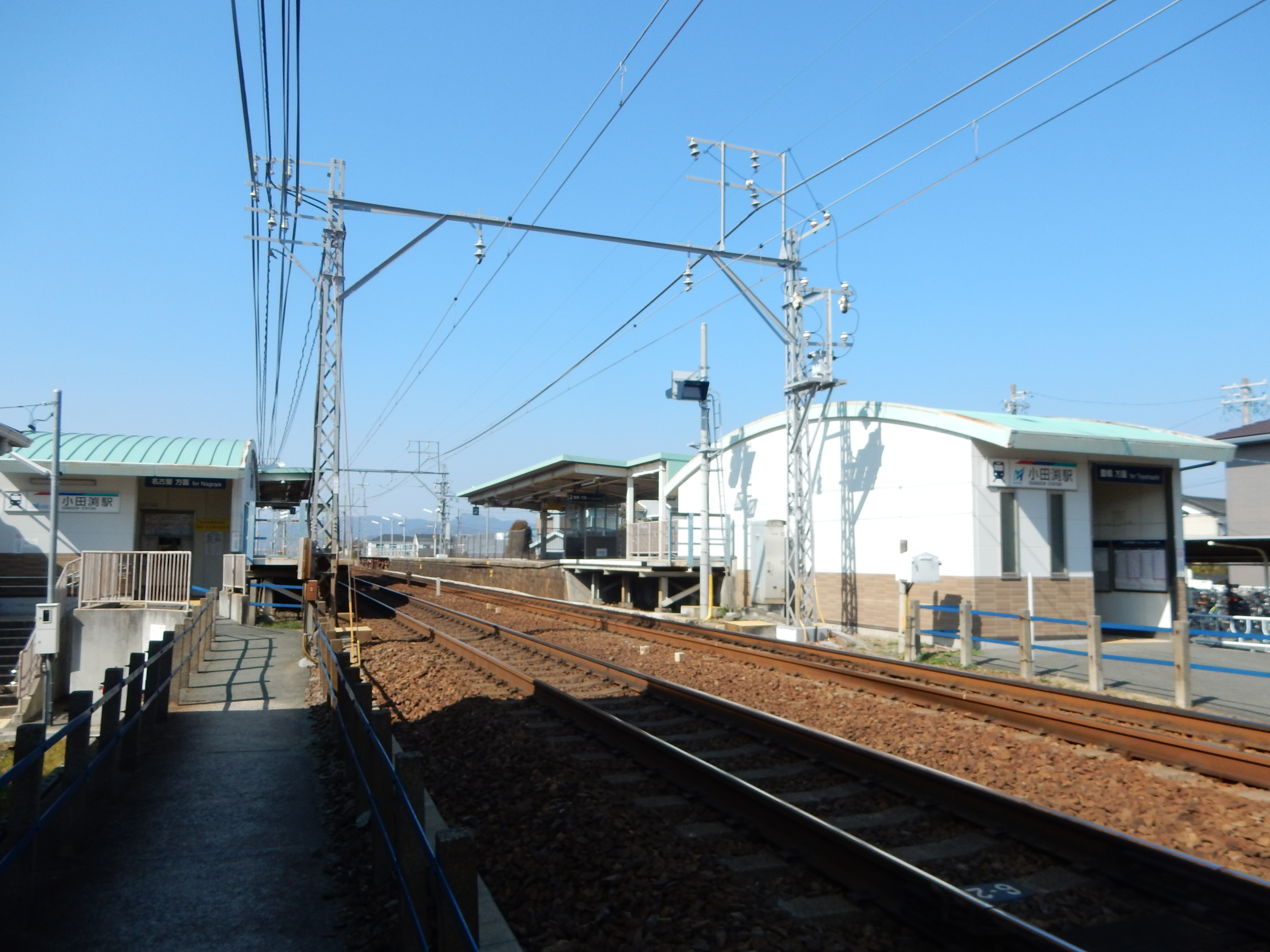
- Odabuchi Station, February 2018

General information
- Location: Utari-43 Odabuchichō, Toyokawa-shi, Aichi-ken 442-0844; Japan
- Coordinates: 34.8145°N 137.3454°E
- Operator: Meitetsu
- Line: ■ Meitetsu Nagoya Line
- Distance: 6.6 kilometers from Toyohashi
- Platforms: 2 side platforms

Construction
- Structure type: At-grade
- Cycle facilities: Yes
- Accessible: Yes

Other information
- Status: Unstaffed
- Station code: NH03
- Website: Official website

History
- Opened: April 1, 1926

Passengers
- FY2017: 344 daily

Services
Preceding station	Meitetsu	Following station
Ina towards Toyohashi	Nagoya Main Line Local	Kō towards Meitetsu Gifu
Location
- Location within Aichi Prefecture Location within Japan

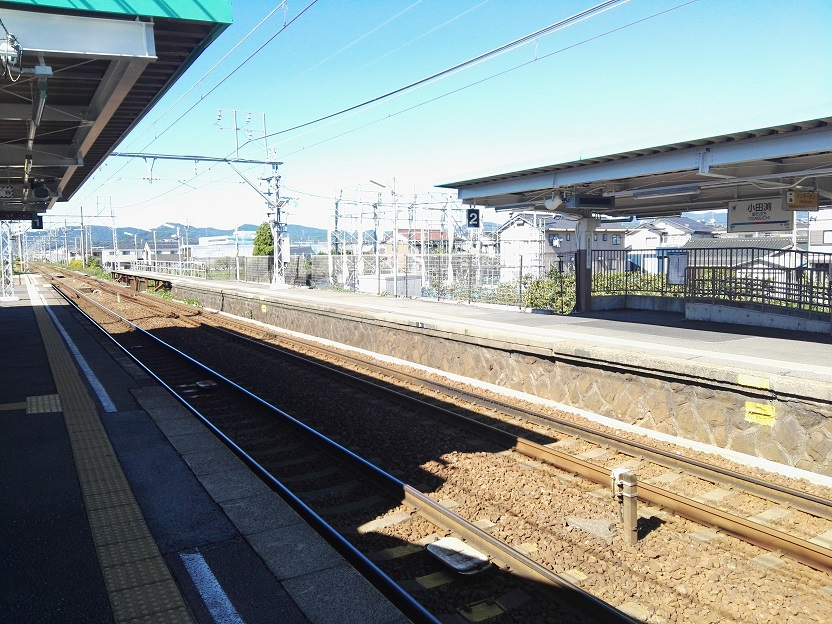
Platforms

Odabuchi Station (小田渕駅, Odabuchi-eki) is a railway station in the city of Toyokawa, Aichi, Japan, operated by Meitetsu.

== Lines ==
Odabuchi Station is served by the Meitetsu Nagoya Main Line and is 6.6 kilometers from the terminus of the line at Toyohashi Station.

== Station layout ==
The station has two elevated opposed side platforms with the station building underneath. The platforms are short, only fitting four car lengths. When six-car trains stop at the station, all doors in the rear two cars remain closed through the use of selective door operation. The station has automated ticket machines, Manaca automated turnstiles and is unattended.

=== Platforms ===
1	■ Nagoya Main Line	For Higashi Okazaki and Meitetsu Nagoya
2	■ Nagoya Main Line	For Toyohashi

== Station history ==
Odabuchi Station was opened on January 12, 1934, as a station on the Aichi Electric Railway. On April 1, 1935, the Aichi Electric Railway merged with the Nagoya Railroad (the forerunner of present-day Meitetsu). The station has been unattended since 1967.

== Passenger statistics ==
In fiscal 2017, the station was used by an average of 260 passengers daily.

== Surrounding area ==
- Japan National Route 1

== See also ==
- List of railway stations in Japan
