= Utō Station =

Railway station in Okazaki, Aichi Prefecture, Japan

Utō Station 宇頭駅

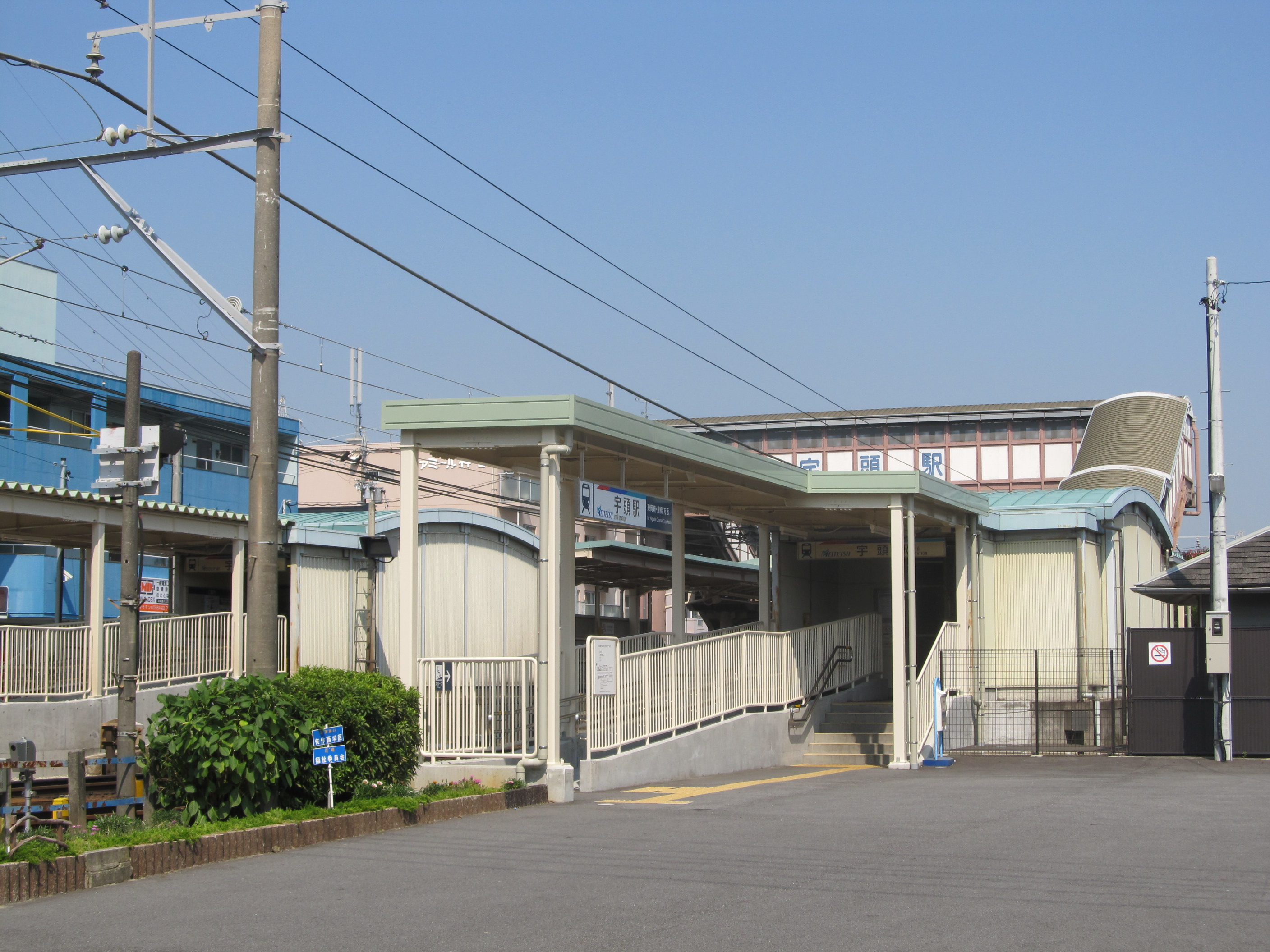
- Utō Station, June 2018

General information
- Location: Yamanokami-2 Utōchō, Okazaki-shi, Aichi-ken 444-0905; Japan
- Coordinates: 34.9714°N 137.1183°E
- Operator: Meitetsu
- Line: ■ Meitetsu Nagoya Line
- Distance: 34.8 kilometers from Toyohashi
- Platforms: 2 side platforms
- Tracks: 2

Construction
- Structure type: At-grade
- Accessible: Yes

Other information
- Status: Unstaffed
- Station code: NH16
- Website: Official website

History
- Opened: 1 June 1923; 103 years ago

Passengers
- FY2017: 3,353 daily

Services
Preceding station	Meitetsu	Following station
Yahagibashi towards Toyohashi	Nagoya Main Line Local	Shin-Anjō towards Meitetsu Gifu
Location
- Location within Aichi Prefecture Location within Japan

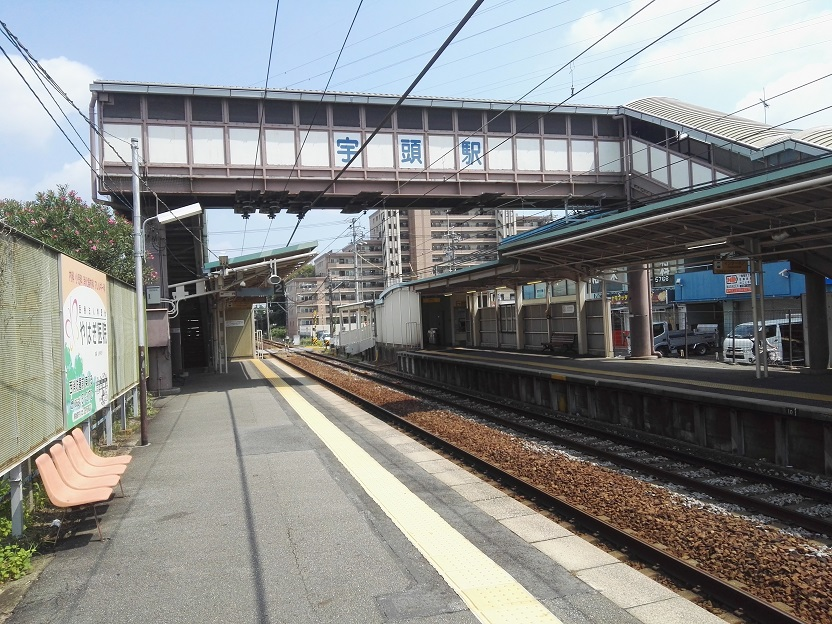
Platforms

Utō Station (宇頭駅, Utō-eki) is a railway station in the city of Okazaki, Aichi, Japan, operated by Meitetsu.

== Lines ==
Utō Station is served by the Meitetsu Nagoya Main Line and is 34.8 kilometers from the terminus of the line at Toyohashi Station.

== Station layout ==
The station has two opposed side platforms connected by a footbridge. The station has automated ticket machines, Manaca automated turnstiles and is unattended.

=== Platforms ===
1	■ Nagoya Main Line	For Meitetsu Nagoya
2	■ Nagoya Main Line	For Higashi Okazaki and Toyohashi

== Station history ==
Utō Station was opened on 1 June 1923 as a station on the privately held Aichi Electric Railway. The Aichi Electric Railway was acquired by the Meitetsu Group on 1 August 1935.

== Passenger statistics ==
In fiscal 2017, the station was used by an average of 3,353 passengers daily.

== Surrounding area ==
- Yahagi Nishi Elementary School
- Utō Kannon

== See also ==
- List of railway stations in Japan
