= Fujikawa Station =

Fujikawa Station is the name of two train stations in Japan:

- Fujikawa Station (Aichi) (藤川駅)
- Fujikawa Station (Shizuoka) (富士川駅)
