= Yahagibashi Station =

Railway station in Okazaki, Aichi Prefecture, Japan

Yahagibashi Station 矢作橋駅

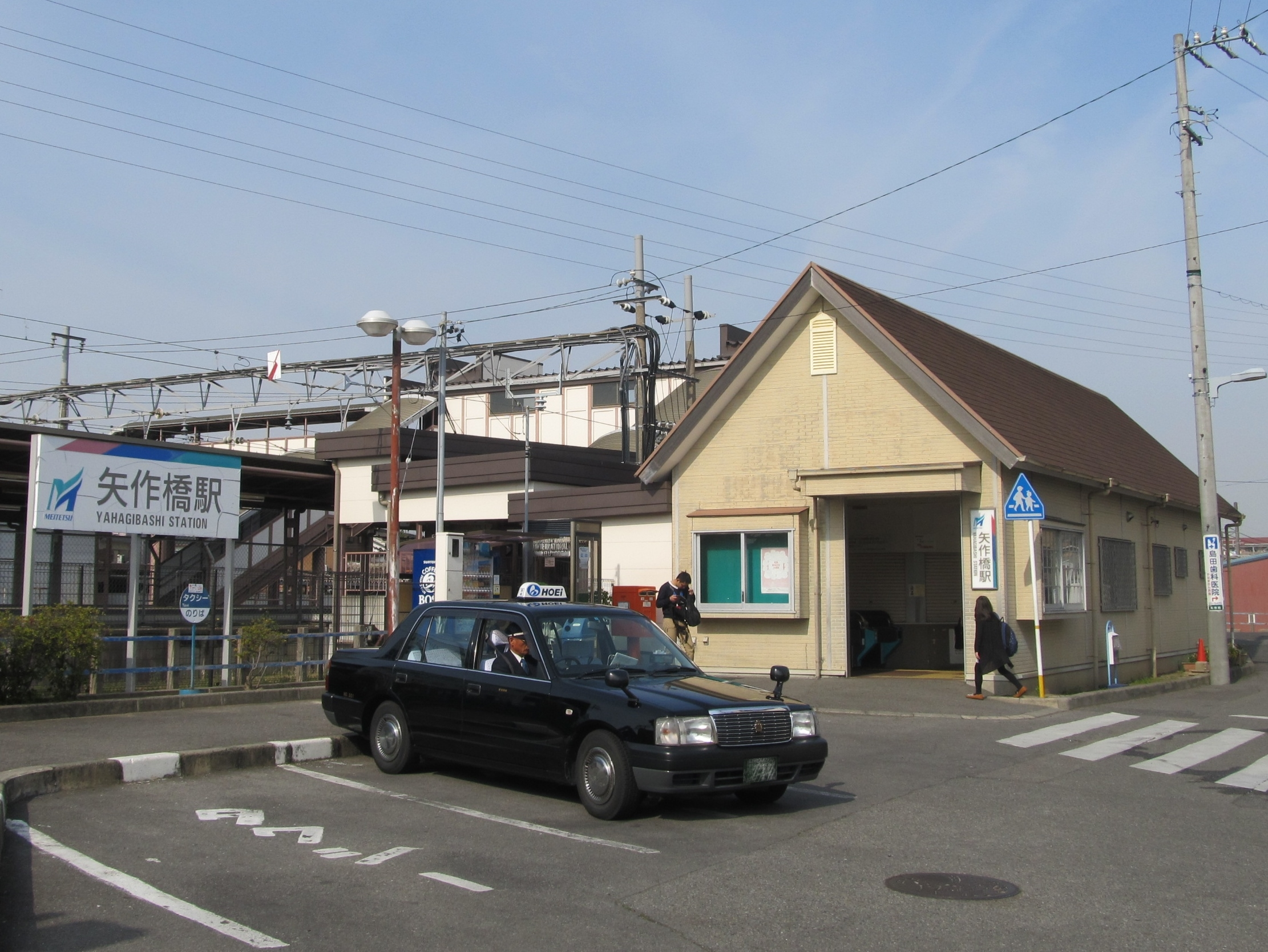
- Yahagibashi Station in March 2016

General information
- Location: Manori-46 Yahagichō, Okazaki-shi, Aichi-ken 444-0943; Japan
- Coordinates: 34.9613°N 137.1399°E
- Operator: Meitetsu
- Line: ■ Meitetsu Nagoya Line
- Distance: 32.5 kilometers from Toyohashi
- Platforms: 2 island platforms

Other information
- Status: Staffed
- Station code: NH15
- Website: Official website

History
- Opened: 1 June 1923; 103 years ago

Passengers
- FY2017: 6,609 daily
Location
- Location within Aichi Prefecture Location within Japan

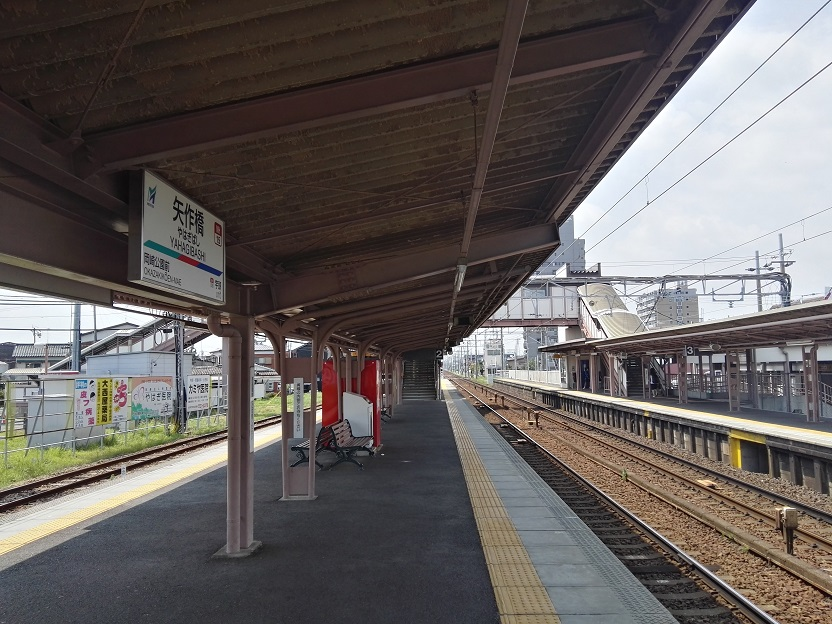
Platforms

Track Layout

Yahagibashi Station (矢作橋駅, Yahagibashi-eki) is a railway station in the city of Okazaki, Aichi, Japan, operated by Meitetsu.

== Lines ==
Yahagibashi Station is served by the Meitetsu Nagoya Main Line and is 32.5 kilometers from the terminus of the line at Toyohashi Station.

== Station layout ==
The station has two island platforms connected by a footbridge, serving three tracks. Platform 4 is a shunt platform with no thru-traffic. The station has automated ticket machines, Manaca automated turnstiles and is staffed.

=== Platforms ===
1	■ Meitetsu Nagoya Main Line	For Meitetsu Nagoya,Inuyama and Meitetsu Gifu
2	■ Meitetsu Nagoya Main Line	For Meitetsu Nagoya, Inuyama, and Meitetsu Gifu
3	■ Meitetsu Nagoya Main Line	For Higashi Okazaki and Toyohashi

== Adjacent stations ==
←	Service	→
Meitetsu Nagoya Main Line
Higashi Okazaki	Express (急行) (some trains stop)	Shin Anjō
Higashi Okazaki	Semi Express (準急)	Shin Anjō
Okazakikōen-mae	Local (普通)	Utō

== Station history ==
Yahagibashi Station was opened on 1 June 1923 as a station on the privately held Aichi Electric Railway. The Aichi Electric Railway was acquired by the Meitetsu Group on 1 August 1935.

== Passenger statistics ==
In fiscal 2017, the station was used by an average of 6,609 passengers daily.

== Surrounding area ==
- Toray Okazaki plant
- Aichi Gakusen University
- Okazaki Josei High School

== See also ==
- List of railway stations in Japan
