= Okazakikōen-mae Station =

Railway station in Okazaki, Aichi Prefecture, Japan

Okazakikōen-mae Station 岡崎公園前駅

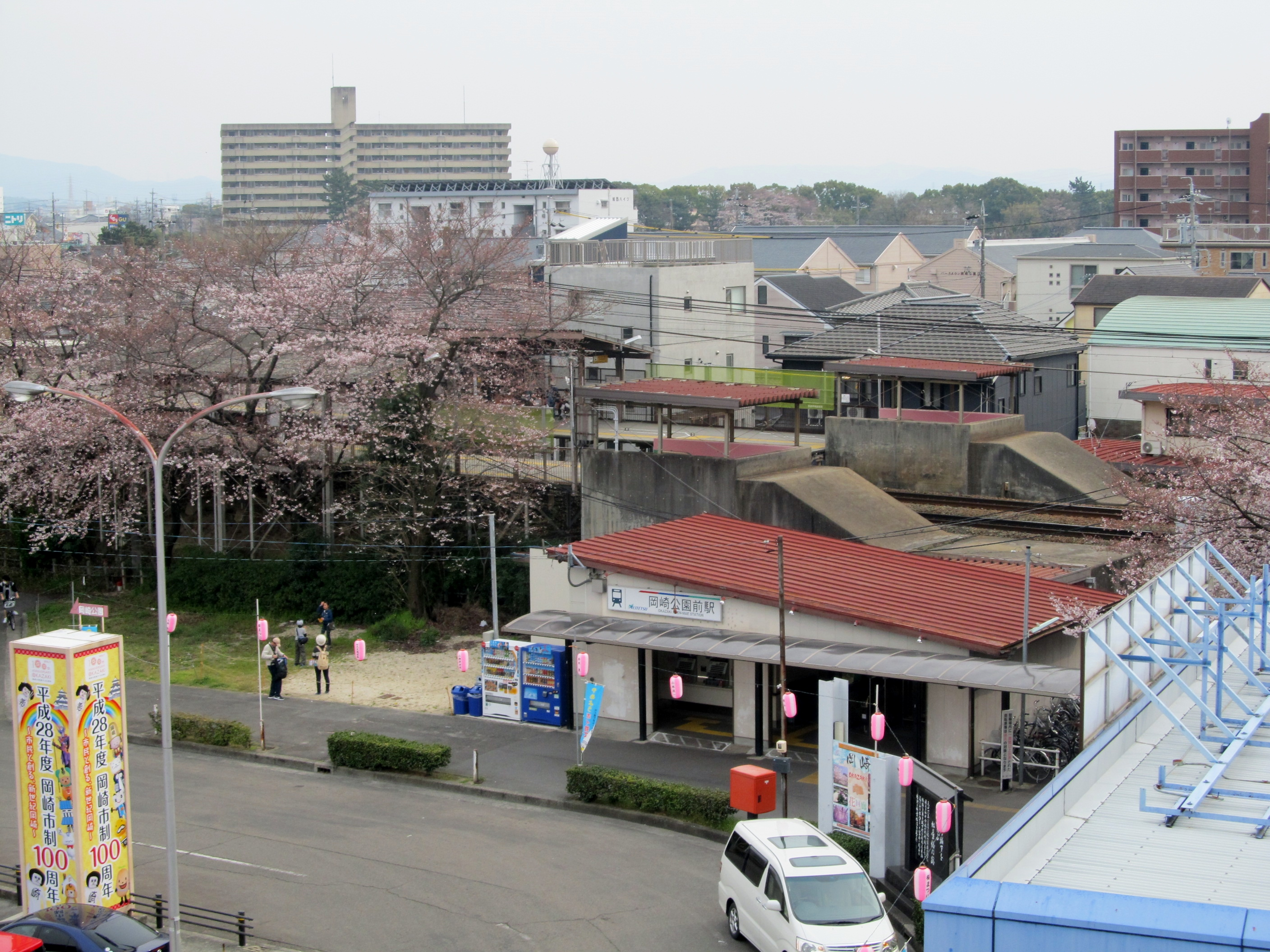
- Okazakikōen-mae Station in March 2016

General information
- Location: 15-2 Nakaokazakichō, Okazaki-shi, Aichiken 444-0921; Japan
- Coordinates: 34.955°N 137.153°E
- Operator: Meitetsu
- Line: ■ Meitetsu Nagoya Line
- Distance: 31.1 kilometers from Toyohashi
- Platforms: 2 side platforms
- Tracks: 2

Construction
- Structure type: At-grade
- Accessible: Yes

Other information
- Status: Staffed
- Station code: NH14
- Website: Official website

History
- Opened: 1 June 1923; 103 years ago
- Former names: Nishi-Okazaki (to 1936)

Passengers
- FY2017: 4,422 daily

Services
Preceding station	Meitetsu	Following station
Higashi-Okazaki towards Toyohashi	Nagoya Main Line Local	Yahagibashi towards Meitetsu Gifu
Location
- Location within Aichi Prefecture Location within Japan

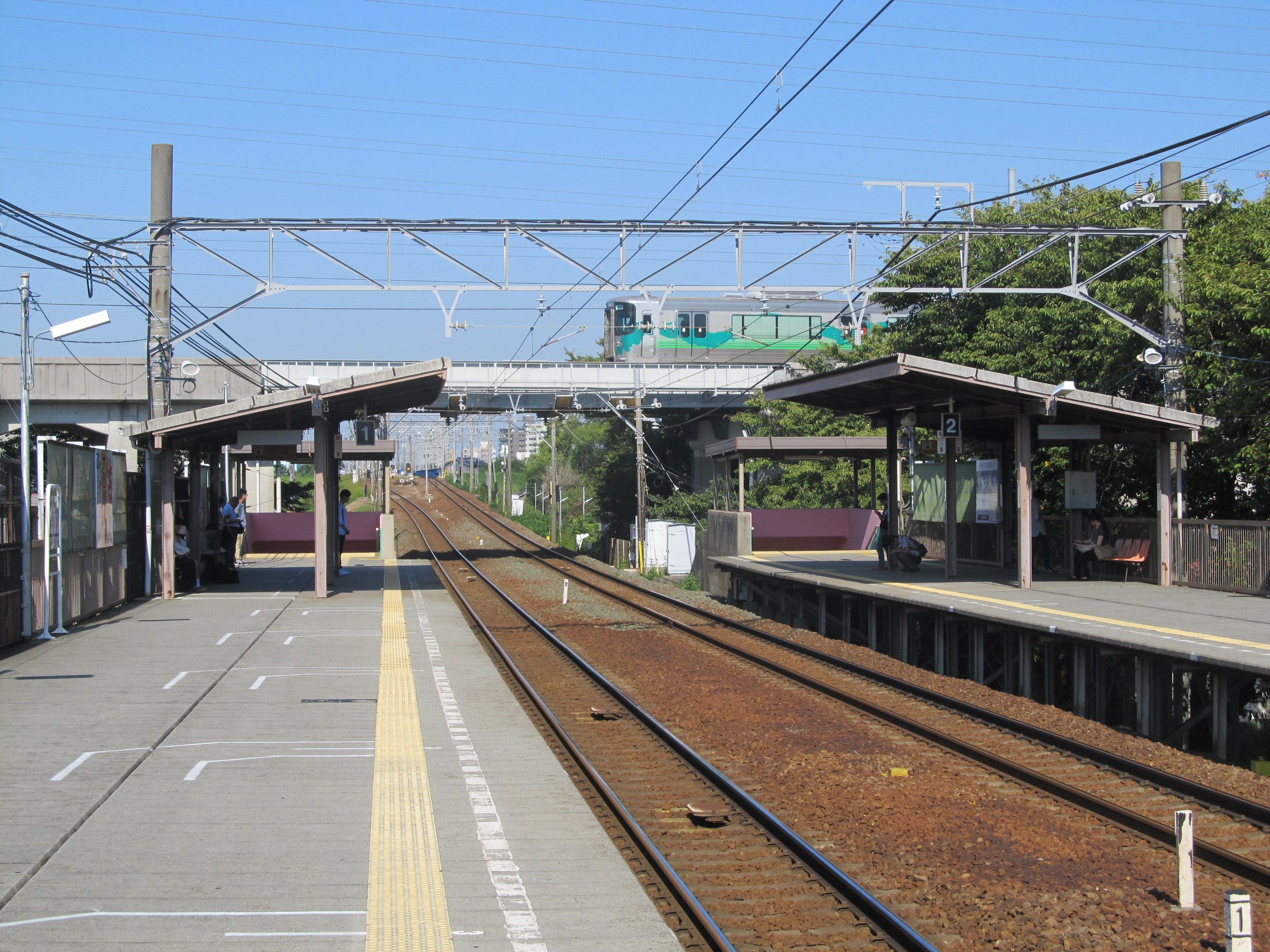
Platforms

Okazakikōen-mae Station (岡崎公園前駅, Okazakikōenmae-eki) is a railway station in the city of Okazaki, Aichi, Japan, operated by Meitetsu.

== Lines ==
Okazakikōen-mae Station is served only by the Meitetsu Nagoya Main Line and is 31.1 kilometers (19.3 mi) from the terminus of the line at Toyohashi Station.

== Station layout ==
The station has two opposed side platforms connected by an underground passage. The station has automated ticket machines, Manaca automated turnstiles and is staffed.

=== Platforms ===
1	■ Nagoya Main Line	For Meitetsu Nagoya
2	■ Nagoya Main Line	For Higashi Okazaki and Toyohashi

== Station history ==
Okazakikōen-mae Station was opened on 1 June 1923 as Nishi-Okazaki Station (西岡崎駅, Nishi-Okazaki-eki) on the privately held Aichi Electric Railway. The Aichi Electric Railway was acquired by the Meitetsu Group on 1 August 1935. The station was renamed to its present name in 1936. The station has been unattended since February 1971.

== Passenger statistics ==
In fiscal 2017, the station was used by an average of 4,422 passengers daily.

== Surrounding area ==
- Naka-Okazaki Station on the Aichi Loop Railway
- Hatcho-miso no sato
- Japan National Route 1

== See also ==
- List of railway stations in Japan
