= Ina Station =

Railway station in Toyokawa, Aichi Prefecture, Japan

Ina Station 伊奈駅

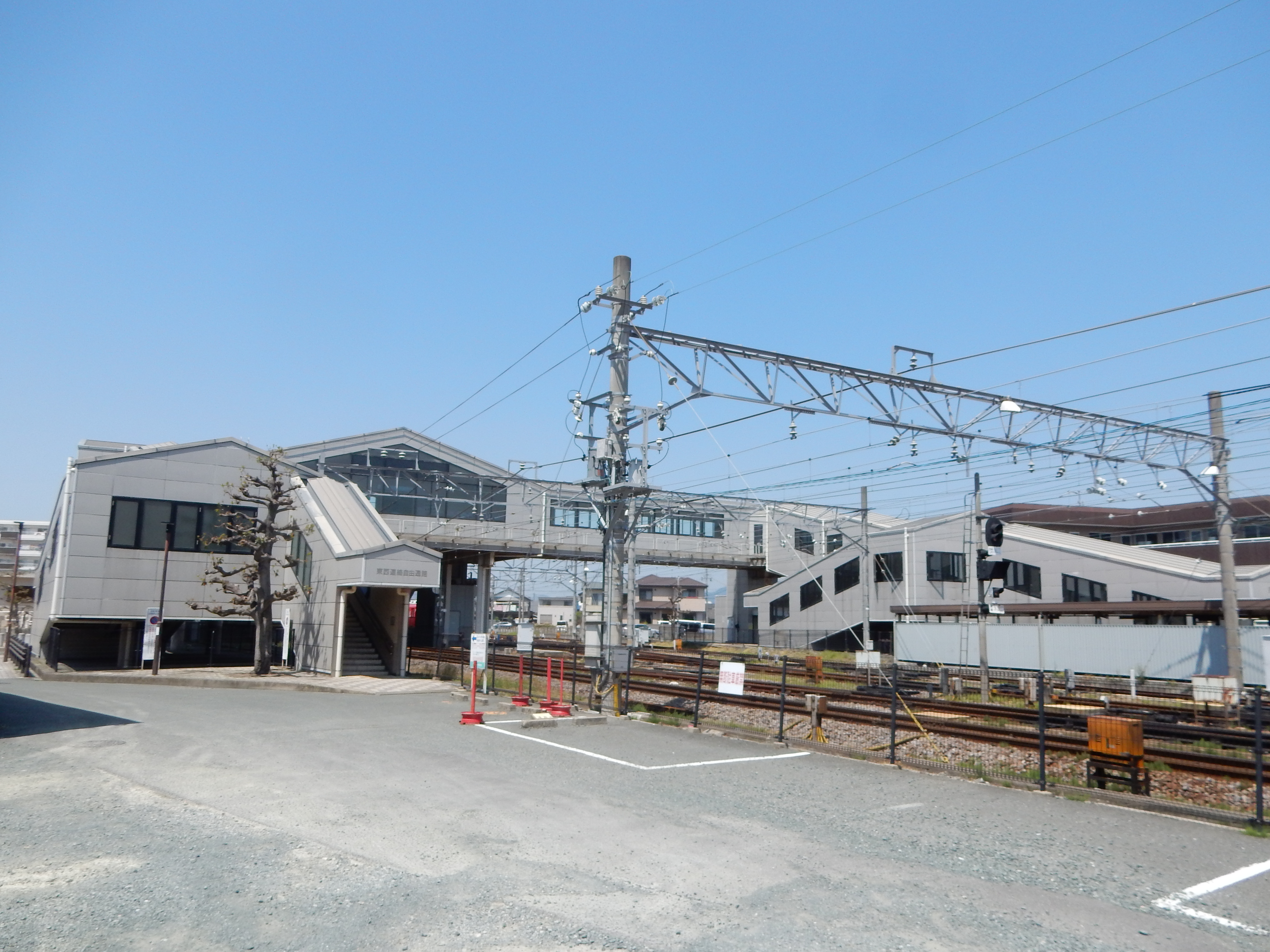
- Ina Station, April 2018

General information
- Location: Minamiyama Shinden-292-1 Inachō, Toyokawa-shi, Aichi-ken 441-0105; Japan
- Coordinates: 34°48′09″N 137°21′18″E
- Operator: Meitetsu
- Line: ■ Meitetsu Nagoya Line
- Distance: 5.0 kilometers from Toyohashi
- Platforms: 2 island + 1 side platform

Other information
- Status: Staffed
- Station code: NH02
- Website: Official website

History
- Opened: 1 June 1927; 99 years ago

Passengers
- FY2017: 1599 daily

Services
Preceding station	Meitetsu	Following station
Toyohashi Terminus	Nagoya Main Line Rapid Limited Express Limited Express (some services)	Kō towards Meitetsu Gifu
Toyohashi Terminus	Nagoya Main Line Express	Kō towards Meitetsu Gifu
Terminus	Nagoya Main Line Semi Express	Kō towards Meitetsu Gifu
Terminus	Nagoya Main Line Local	Odabuchi towards Meitetsu Gifu
Location
- Location within Aichi Prefecture Location within Japan

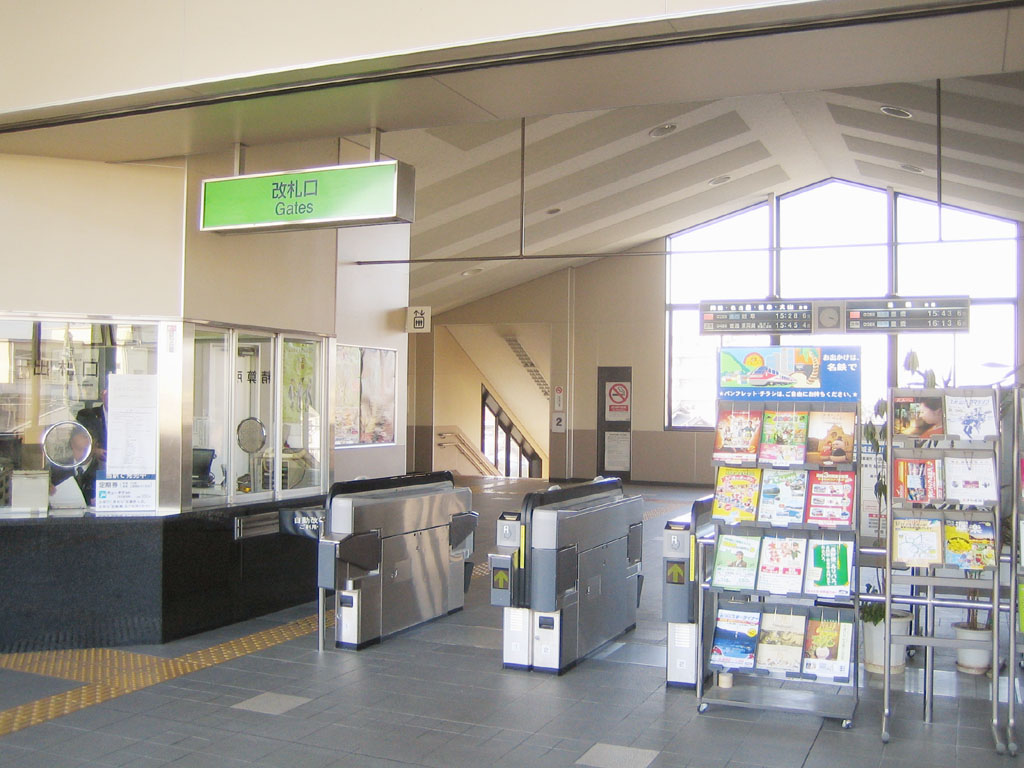
Ticket Gate

track layout

Ina Station (伊奈駅, Ina-eki) is a railway station in the city of Toyokawa, Aichi, Japan, operated by Meitetsu.

== Lines ==
Ina Station is served by the Meitetsu Nagoya Main Line and is 5.0 kilometers from the terminus of the line at Toyohashi Station.

== Station layout ==
The station has one side platform and two island platforms connected by a footbridge. However, platforms 1 and 5 are not in use. The station has automated ticket machines, Manaca automated turnstiles and is staffed.

=== Platforms ===
2	■ Meitetsu Nagoya Main Line	For Higashi Okazaki, Meitetsu Nagoya and Inuyama
3	■ Meitetsu Nagoya Main Line	For Toyohashi
4	■ Meitetsu Nagoya Main Line	For Higashi Okazaki, Meitetsu Nagoya and Inuyama

== Station history ==
Ina Station was opened on 1 June 1927 as a station on the Aichi Electric Railway. On 1 April 1935, the Aichi Electric Railway merged with the Nagoya Railroad (the forerunner of present-day Meitetsu). A new station building was completed in March 1996.

== Passenger statistics ==
In fiscal 2017, the station was used by an average of 1599 passengers daily.

== Surrounding area ==
- Nishi-Kozakai Station
- Kozakai Station

== See also ==
- List of railway stations in Japan
