= Meitetsu Toyokawa Line =

Railway line in Aichi Prefecture, Japan

Toyokawa Line

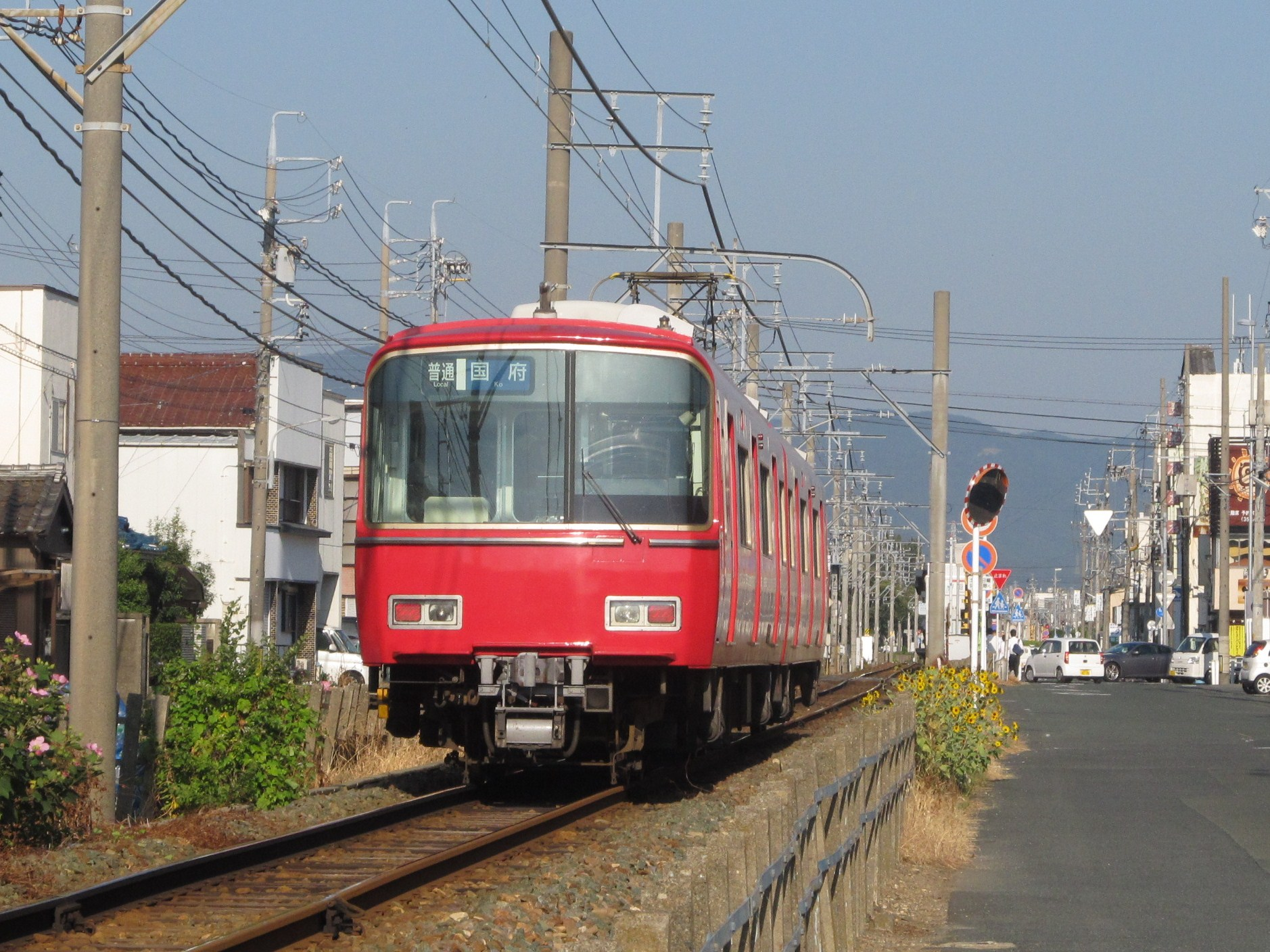
- A 6800 series EMU on the Meitetsu Toyokawa Line

Overview
- Native name: 豊川線
- Status: In service
- Owner: Nagoya Railroad Co., Ltd.
- Locale: Toyokawa, Aichi
- Termini: Kō; Toyokawa-Inari
- Stations: 5

Service
- Type: Commuter rail classified as Tram
- System: Meitetsu
- Route number: TK
- Operator(s): Nagoya Railroad Co., Ltd.

History
- Opened: 25 December 1954; 71 years ago

Technical
- Line length: 7.2 km (4.5 mi)
- Track gauge: 1,067 mm (3 ft 6 in)
- Electrification: 1,500 V DC, overhead catenary

The Toyokawa Line (豊川線, Toyokawa-sen) is a railway line in Toyokawa, Aichi, Japan, operated by the private railway operator Nagoya Railroad (Meitetsu). The line connects Kō Station in the western part of Toyokawa with Toyokawa-inari Station in the eastern part of Toyokawa.

== History ==
The line was constructed during the Pacific War in 1945 to carry commuters to the Toyokawa Naval Arsenal. The construction materials were taken from lines suspended or converted into a single-track line, and the trains were also taken from existing lines. As the line was originally named Toyokawa Shinai Line (豊川市内線) and built with tram standards, the line is covered by the Tramways Act. The section between Kō and Suwachō opened on 18 February 1945. However, the Toyokawa Naval Arsenal becomes defunct after air raids in August 1945. After the end of World War II, the line was started to be used by passengers to visit the Toyokawa Inari.

The voltage of the line was increased to 1,500 V in 1953. The line extended to Toyokawa-inari the next year. This extension made the Kozakai Branch Line branching from Ina to Kozakai redundant, which was closed at the same time. The area around Yawata Station was elevated in 1996.

== Stations ==
No.	Image	Station name	Japanese	Distance (km)	Transfers
		Kō	国府	0.0	Nagoya Main Line (NH04)
		Yawata	八幡	2.5	
		Suwachō	諏訪町	4.4	
		Inariguchi	稲荷口	6.0	
		Toyokawa-inari	豊川稲荷	7.2	Iida Line (Toyokawa: CD04)

=== Ridership ===
No.	Station name	Passengers (2022)
	Kō	9,034
	Yawata	2,409
	Suwachō	4,109
	Inariguchi	964
	Toyokawa-inari	4,600

== Services ==
As of 2025, trains service the station every 16-30 minutes from 5am to 11pm. Most services during daytime only runs inside the line, while services during rush hours provide through service to stations like Meitetsu Ichinomiya Station through the Nagoya Main Line.
