= Kō Station (Aichi) =

Railway station in Toyokawa, Aichi Prefecture, Japan

Kō Station 国府駅

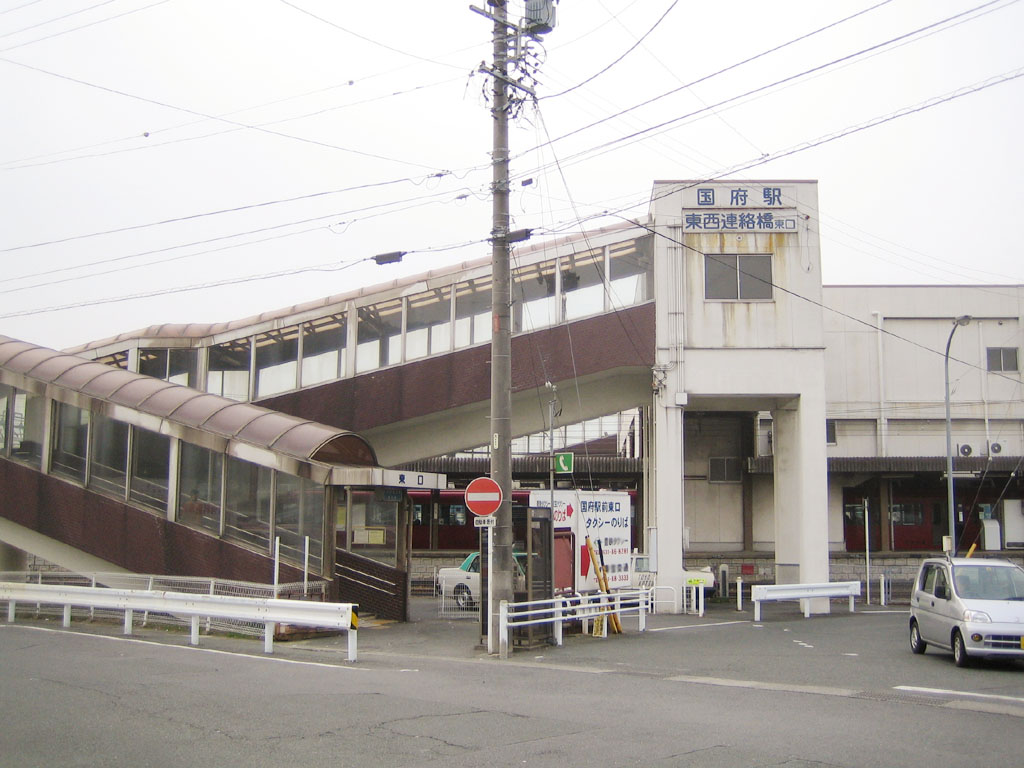
- East Exit of Kō Station

General information
- Location: Hazenji-35 Kubochō, Toyokawa-shi, Aichi-ken 442-0856; Japan
- Coordinates: 34.8375872°N 137.328136°E
- Operator: Meitetsu
- Lines: ■ Meitetsu Nagoya Main Line; ■ Meitetsu Toyokawa Line
- Distance: 9.6 kilometers from Toyohashi
- Platforms: 3 island platforms

Other information
- Status: Staffed
- Station code: NH04
- Website: Official website

History
- Opened: 1 April 1926; 100 years ago

Passengers
- FY2017: 5113 daily
Location
- Location within Aichi Prefecture Location within Japan

Track layout

Kō Station (国府駅, Kō-eki) is a junction railway station in the city of Toyokawa, Aichi, Japan, operated by Meitetsu.

== Lines ==
Kō Station is a station on the Meitetsu Nagoya Line and is 9.6 kilometers from the terminus of the line at Toyohashi. It is also a terminal station for the Meitetsu Toyokawa Line and is 7.2 kilometers from the opposing terminus of the line at Toyokawa-inari.

== Station layout ==
The station has three island platforms connected to the station building by a footbridge. The station has automated ticket machines, Manaca automated turnstiles and is staffed.

=== Platforms ===
1	■ Meitetsu Nagoya Main Line	For Higashi Okazaki, Meitetsu Nagoya, Meitetsu Gifu, and Shin Unuma
2	■ Meitetsu Nagoya Main Line	For Higashi Okazaki, Meitetsu Nagoya, Meitetsu Gifu, and Shin Unuma
3	■ Meitetsu Nagoya Main Line	For Ina and Toyohashi
4	■ Meitetsu Nagoya Main Line	For Ina and Toyohashi
	■ Meitetsu Toyokawa Line	For Toyokawa-inari
5	■ Meitetsu Nagoya Main Line	For Higashi Okazaki, Meitetsu Nagoya, Meitetsu Gifu, and Shin Unuma
	■ Meitetsu Toyokawa Line	For Toyokawa-inari
6	■ Meitetsu Toyokawa Line	For Toyokawa-inari

== Adjacent stations ==
←	Service	→
Meitetsu Nagoya Line
Rapid Limited Express: Does not stop at this station
Toyohashi	Limited Express	Higashi Okazaki
Ina	Express	Motojuku
Ina	Semi Express	Motojuku
Odabuchi	Local	Goyu
Toyokawa Line
Yawata	Rapid Limited Express	Motojuku (Main Line)
Yawata	Limited Express	Motojuku (Main Line)
Yawata	Express	Motojuku (Main Line)
Yawata	Semi Express	Motojuku (Main Line)
Yawata	Local	Goyu (Main Line)

== Station history ==
Kō Station was opened on 1 April 1926 as a station on the Aichi Electric Railway's Toyohashi Line connecting Toyohashi with Kozakai in the former municipality of Kō. On 1 April 1935, the Aichi Electric Railway merged with the Nagoya Railroad (the forerunner of present-day Meitetsu). A spur line to Toyokawa was opened on 18 February 1945. In December 1987, the station platforms were extended to be able to accommodate trains of six-carriages in length. The station building was rebuilt in 2008-2009.

== Passenger statistics ==
In fiscal 2017, the station was used by an average of 5113 passengers daily.

== Surrounding area ==
- ruins of Mikawa Kokubun-ji
- Kō Elementary School
- Kō Junior High School

== Gallery ==
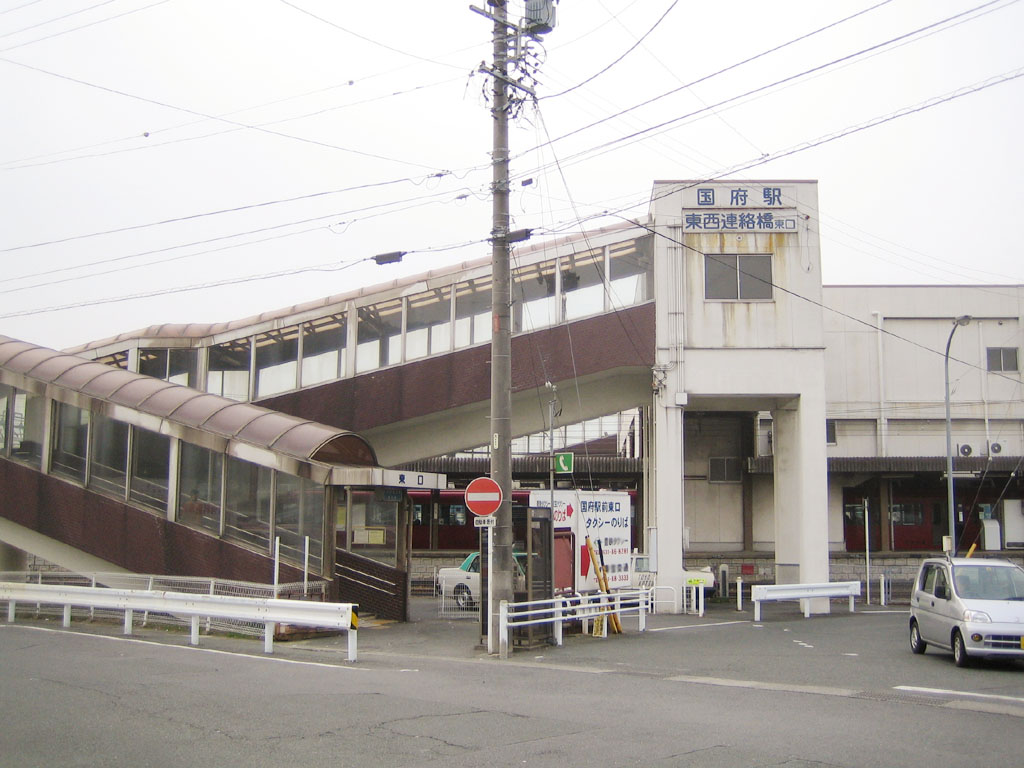
East side

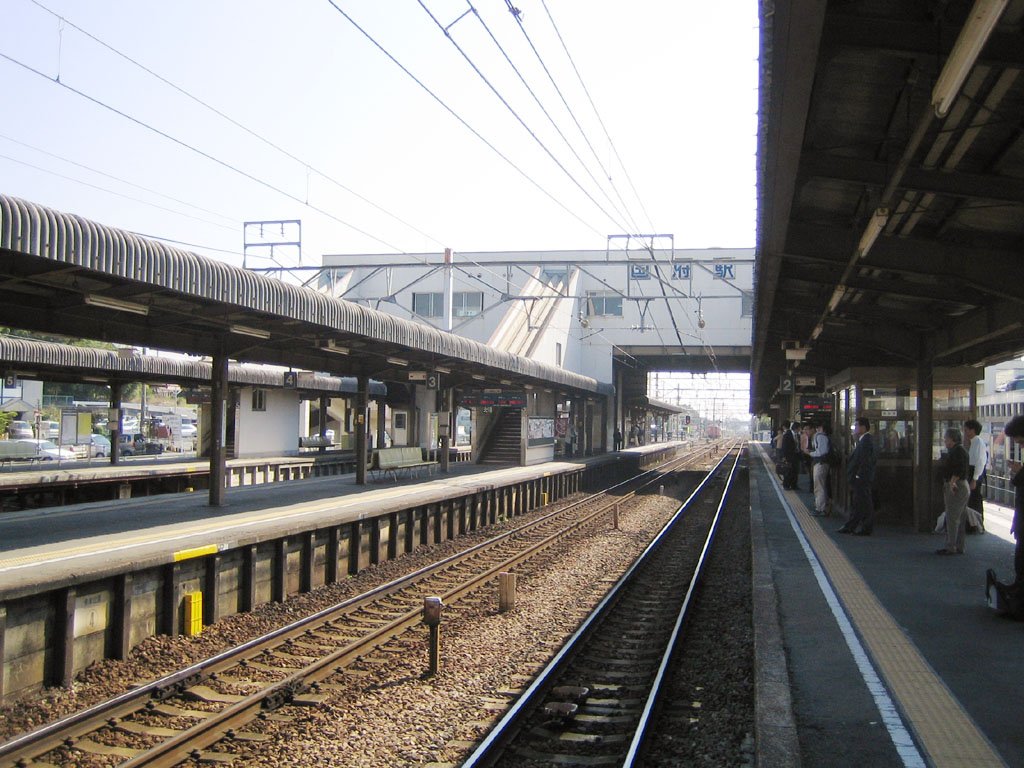
Platform

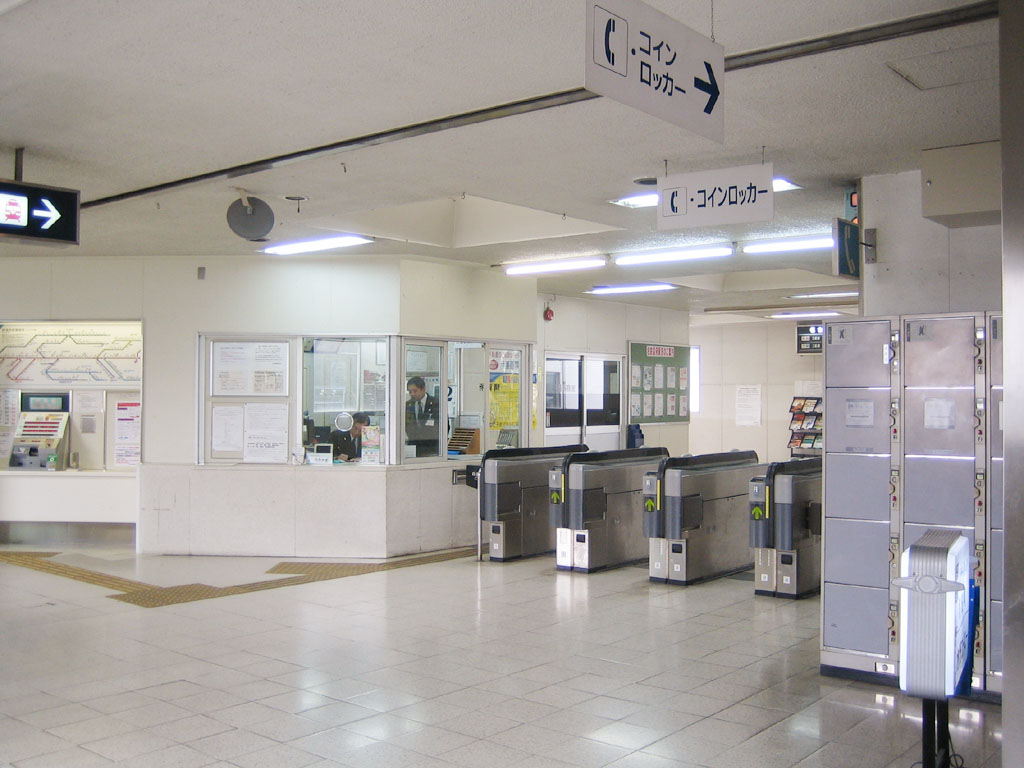
Concourse and Wicket

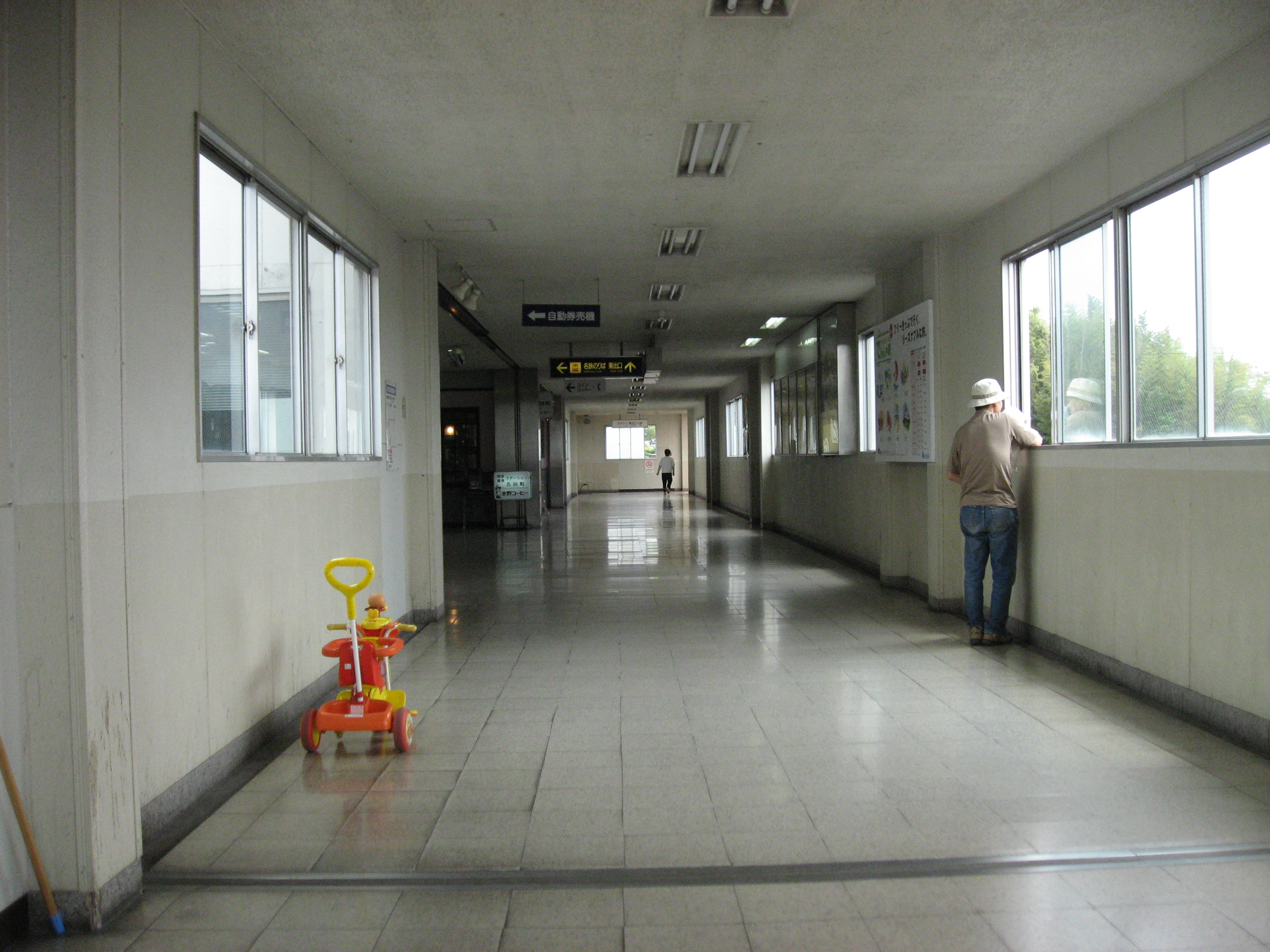
Passageway between east and west side

== See also ==
- List of railway stations in Japan
