= Sannō Station =

Sannō Station is the name of several rail stations in Japan

- Sannō Station (Aichi) - in Aichi Prefecture
- Sannō Station (Nagano) - a former station in Nagano Prefecture
- Sannō Station (Fukui) - in Fukui Prefecture
- Tameike-sannō Station - in Tokyo
