= Meitetsu Department Store =

Japanese retail chain

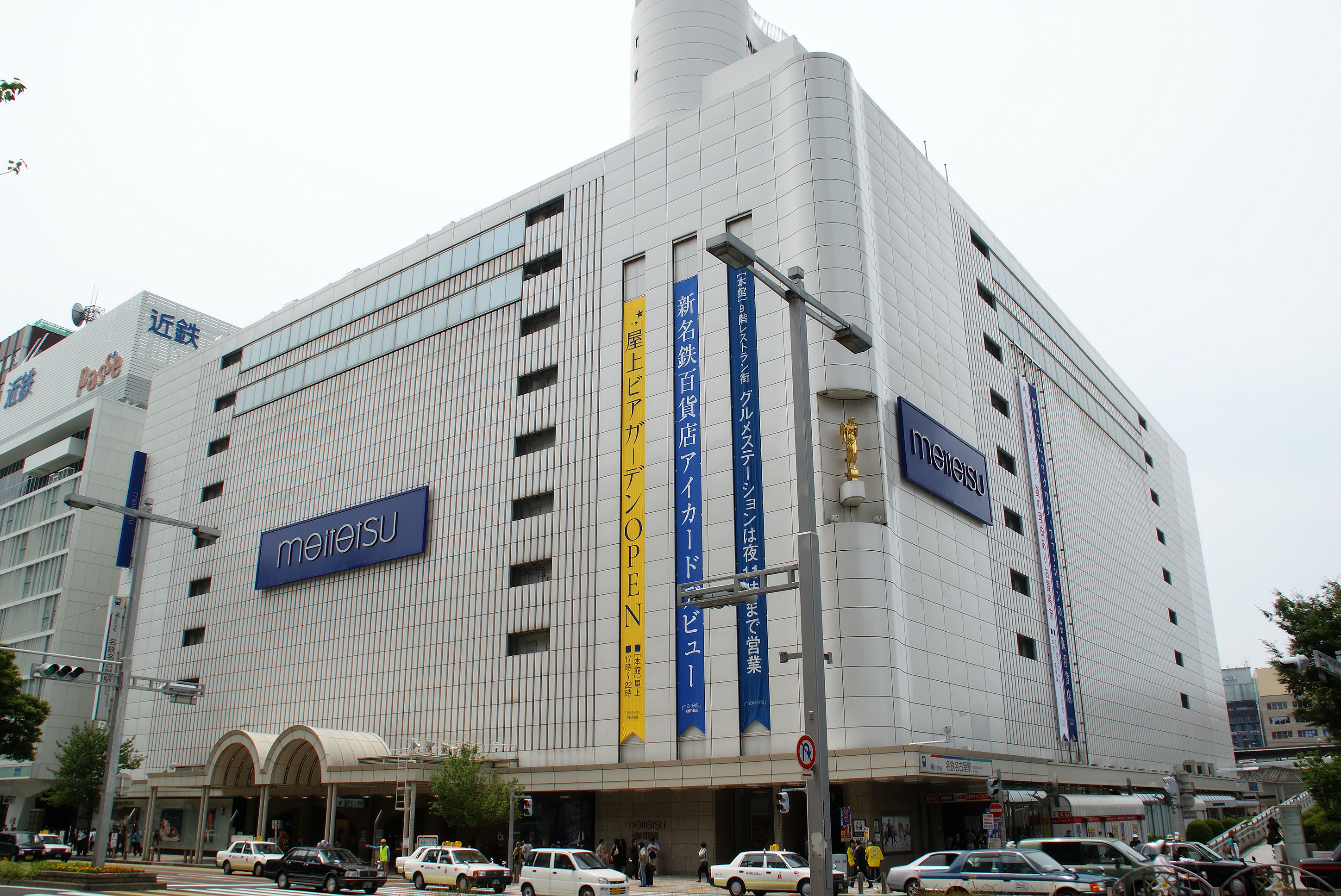
Meitetsu Department Store (2009)

The Meitetsu Department Store (名鉄百貨店, Meitetsu Hyakkaten) was a department store in Nagoya, Japan run by Meitetsu Department Store Co., Ltd., a subsidiary of Nagoya Railroad (Meitetsu). It opened in December 1954 and was located above Meitetsu Nagoya Station in Nakamura Ward, adjacent to Nagoya Station (served by JR and the Nagoya Municipal Subway) and Kintetsu-Nagoya Station.

After 71 years in operation, it closed at the end of February 2026 as part of a redevelopment plan for the station area. However, this plan was put on hold in December of the previous year following problems securing contractors due to labor shortages and raising labor costs; as a result, it is "uncertain when the store building will be demolished and a new building erected".
