= Sannō Station (Aichi) =

Railway station in Nagoya, Japan

Coordinates: 35.1525°N 136.889°E

Sannō Station 山王駅

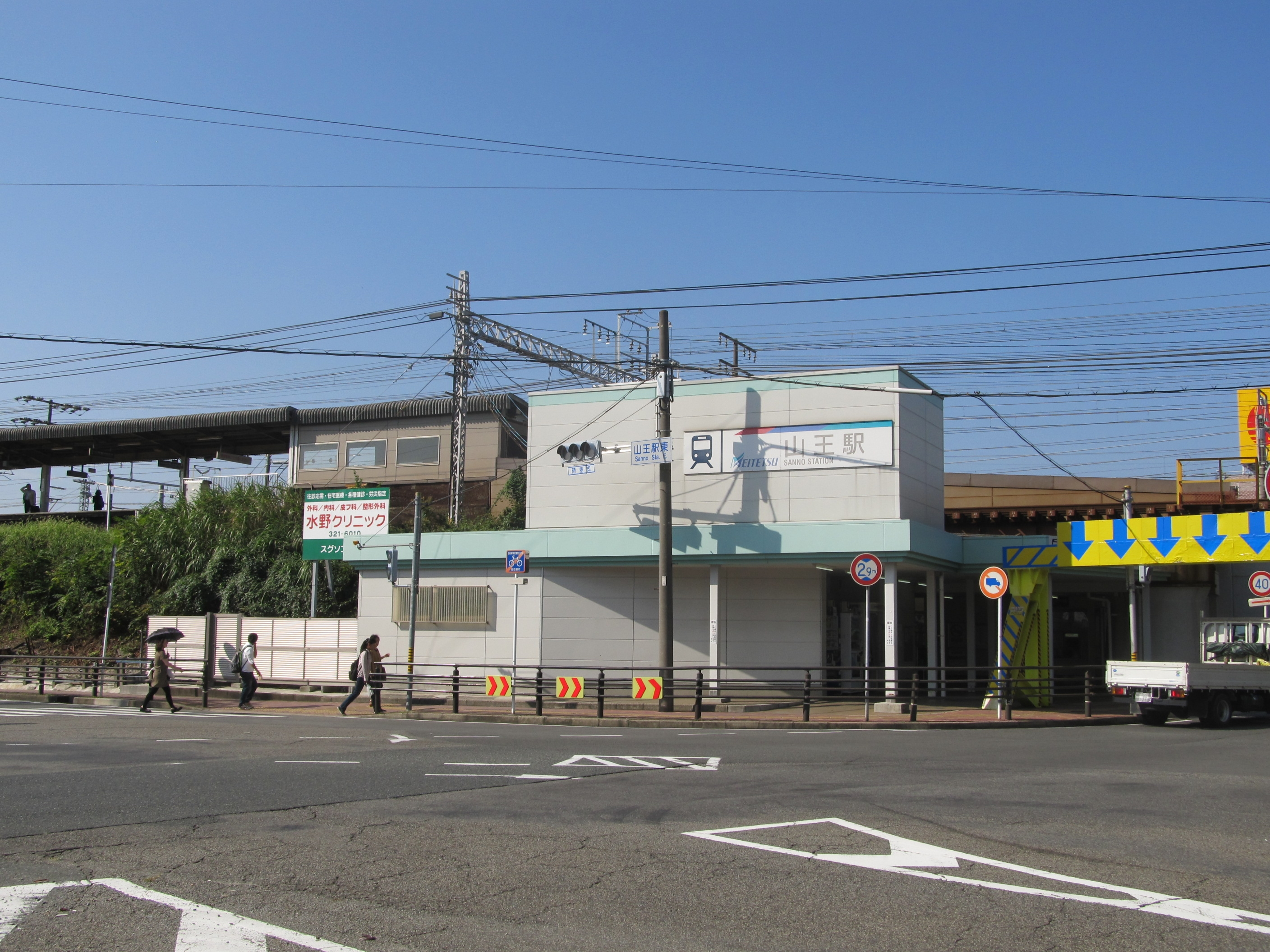

General information
- Location: Nakagawa-ku, Nagoya, Aichi; Japan
- Operator: Nagoya Railroad
- Line: Meitetsu Nagoya Main Line
- Platforms: 2
- Tracks: 2

Construction
- Structure type: Elevated
- Accessible: Yes

History
- Opened: 1944
- Former names: Chūnichi-kyūjō-mae; Nagoya-kyūjō-mae

Passengers
- 2006: 933,423

Services
Preceding station	Meitetsu	Following station
Kanayama towards Toyohashi	Nagoya Main Line Local	Meitetsu Nagoya towards Meitetsu Gifu
Location

Sannō Station (山王駅, Sannō-eki) is a railway station located in Nakagawa-ku, Nagoya, Aichi, Japan.

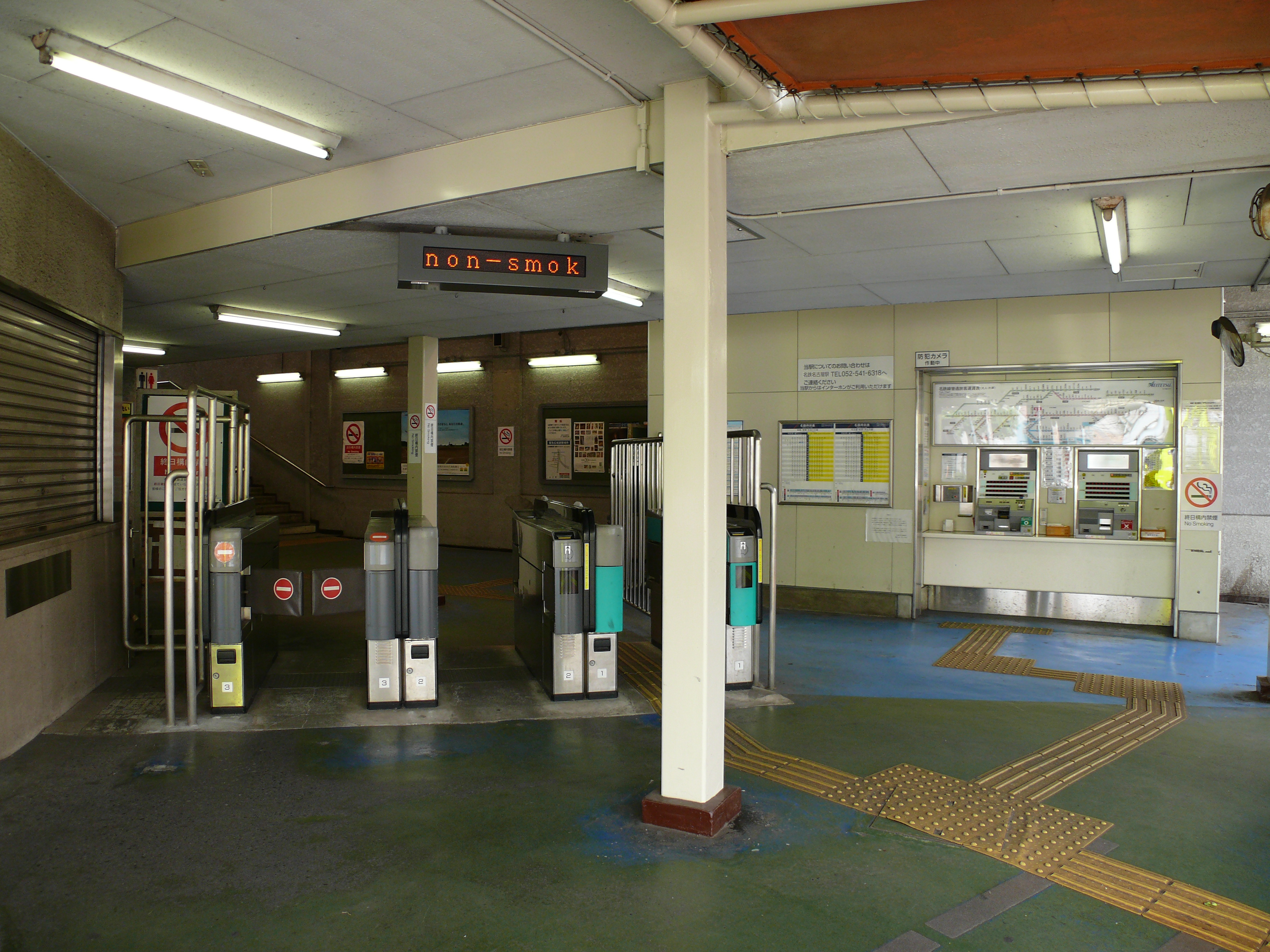
Ticket gate

== Lines ==
- Nagoya Railroad
  - Meitetsu Nagoya Main Line

== Layout ==
One island platform serves two tracks.

=== Platform ===
1	■ Nagoya Main Line	for Nagoya, Ichinomiya and Gifu
1	■ Inuyama Line	for Iwakura and Inuyama
1	■ Tsushima Line; Bisai Line	for Tsushima, Saya and Yatomi
2	■ Nagoya Main Line	for Kanayama, Toyoake, Higashi Okazaki and Toyohashi
2	■ Tokoname Line	for Ōtagawa and Tokoname
2	■ Kowa Line	for Chita Handa and Kōwa

== History ==
Sannō Station opened in September 1944. As Chunichi Dragons were based in the adjacent Nagoya Baseball Stadium, the station name was changed to Chūnichi-kyūjō-mae Station (中日球場前駅, Chūnichi-kyūjō-mae-eki) in 1956 and then Nagoya-kyūjō-mae Station (ナゴヤ球場前駅, Nagoya-kyūjō-mae-eki) in 1976. Following the Dragons' move to Nagoya Dome in 1997, the station name was restored in January 2005.
