= Toyokawa-inari Station =

Railway station in Toyokawa, Aichi Prefecture, Japan

Toyokawa-inari Station 豊川稲荷駅

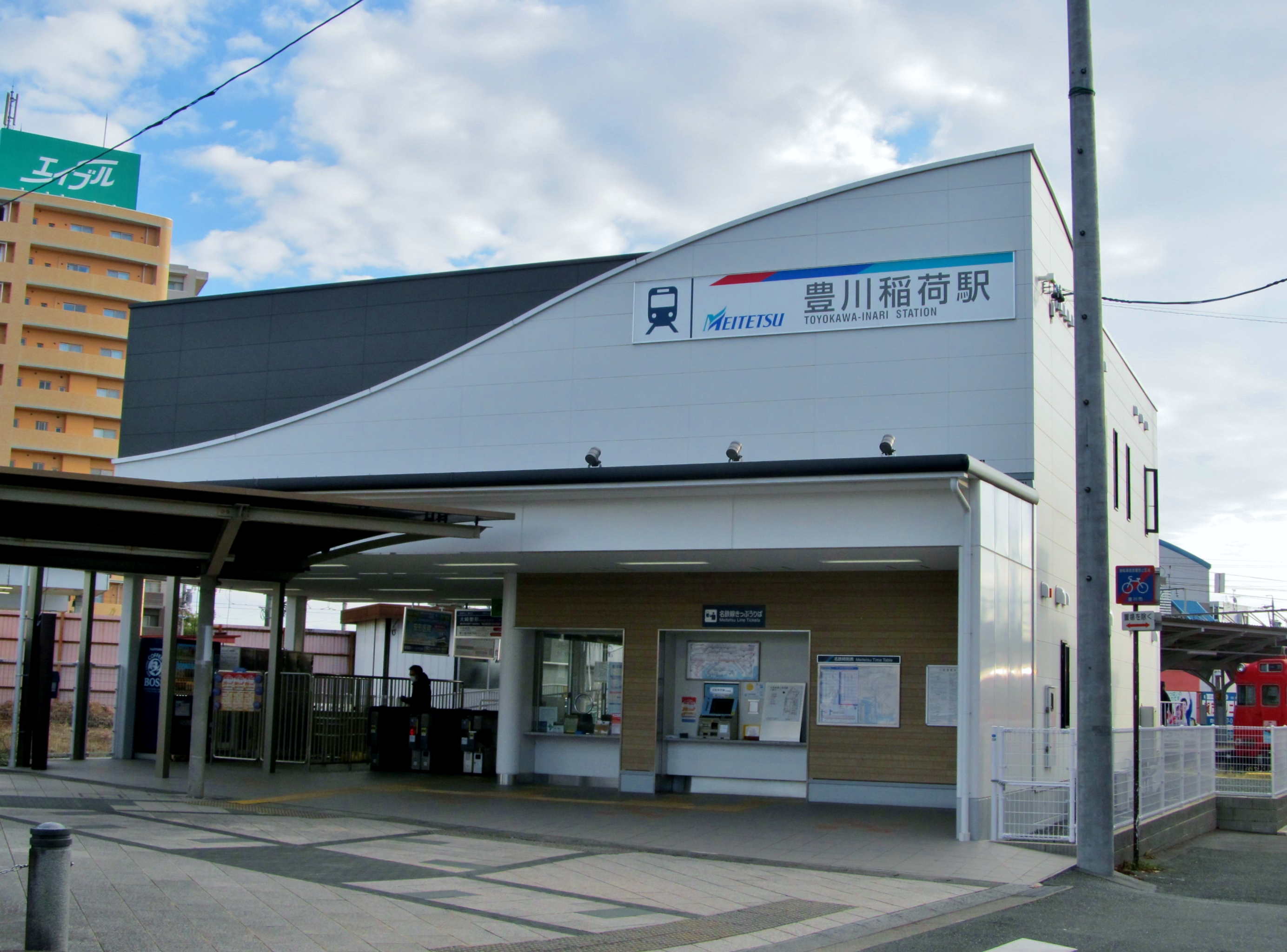
- Nagoya Railroad Toyokawa Line Toyokawa-inari Station Building

General information
- Location: Nihodori Toyokawacho, Toyokawa-shi, Aichi-ken 442-0033; Japan
- Coordinates: 34.8221°N 137.396°E
- Operator: Meitetsu
- Line: ■ Meitetsu Toyokawa Line
- Distance: 7.2 kilometers from Kō
- Platforms: 1 island platform

Other information
- Status: Staffed
- Station code: TK04
- Website: Official website

History
- Opened: December 25, 1954
- Former names: Shin-Toyokawa (to 1955)

Passengers
- FY2017: 2592 daily
Location
- Location within Aichi Prefecture Location within Japan

Track layout

Toyokawa-inari Station (豊川稲荷駅, Toyokawa-inari-eki) is a railway station in the city of Toyokawa, Aichi, Japan, operated by Meitetsu.

== Lines ==
Toyokawa-inari Station is a terminal station of the Meitetsu Toyokawa Line and is 7.2 kilometers from the opposing terminus of the line at Kō.

== Station layout ==
The station has one island platform with both tracks terminating at the end of the platform. The station has automated ticket machines, Manaca automated turnstiles and, as of 2024, is no longer staffed.

=== Platforms ===
1-2	■ Meitetsu Toyokawa Line	for Kō, Higashi Okazaki, Meitetsu Nagoya, and Meitetsu Gifu

== Adjacent stations ==
←	Service	→
Meitetsu Toyokawa Line
Terminus	Rapid Limited Express	Inariguchi
Terminus	Limited Express	Inariguchi
Terminus	Express	Inariguchi
Terminus	Semi Express	Inariguchi
Terminus	Local	Inariguchi

== Station history ==
The station opened on December 25, 1954 as Shin-Toyokawa Station (新豊川駅, Shin-Toyokawa-eki). It was renamed Toyokawa-inari on May 1, 1955. At the end of 1984, the platforms were lengthened to accommodate six-car trains.

== Passenger statistics ==
In fiscal 2017, the station was used by an average of 2592 passengers daily.

== Surrounding area ==
- Toyokawa Inari
- Tobu Junior High School

== See also ==
- List of railway stations in Japan
