= Higashi Okazaki Station =

Railway station in Okazaki, Aichi Prefecture, Japan

Higashi Okazaki Station 東岡崎駅

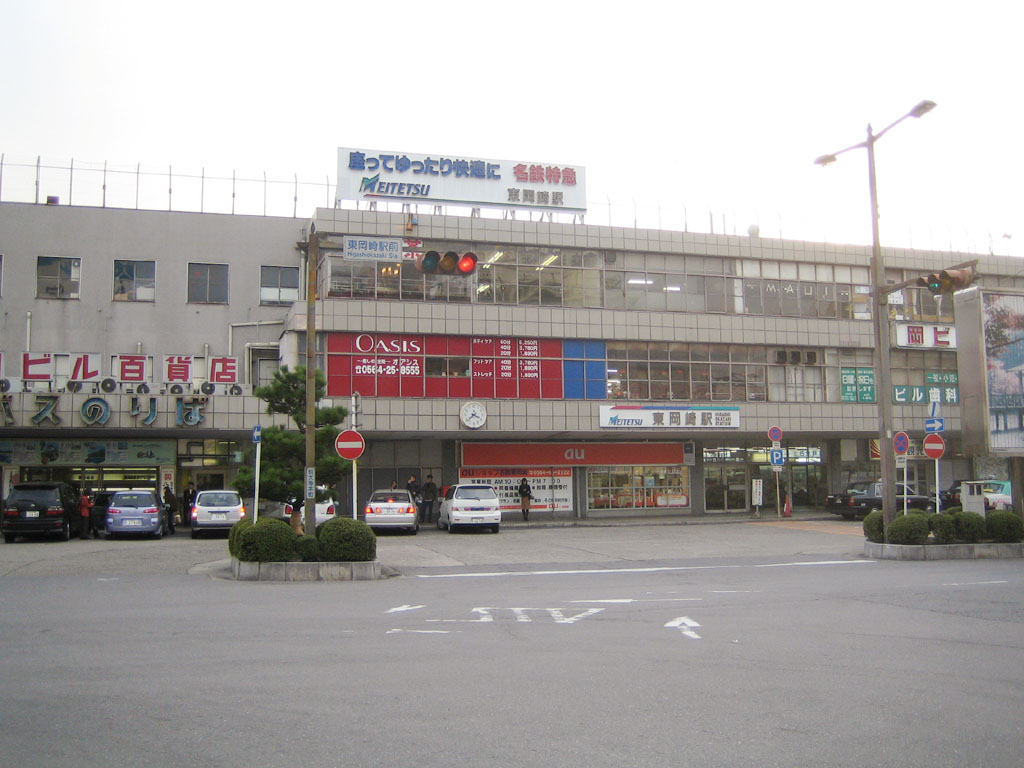
- North Gate of Higashi Okazaki Station

General information
- Location: 4-70 Myōdaiji Honmachi, Okazaki-shi, Aichi-ken 444-0860; Japan
- Coordinates: 34.951858°N 137.167364°E
- Operator: Meitetsu
- Line: ■ Meitetsu Nagoya Line
- Distance: 29.8 kilometers from Toyohashi
- Platforms: 2 island platforms

Other information
- Status: Staffed
- Station code: NH13
- Website: Official website

History
- Opened: 8 August 1923; 103 years ago

Passengers
- FY2017: 39,675 daily
Location
- Location within Aichi Prefecture Location within Japan

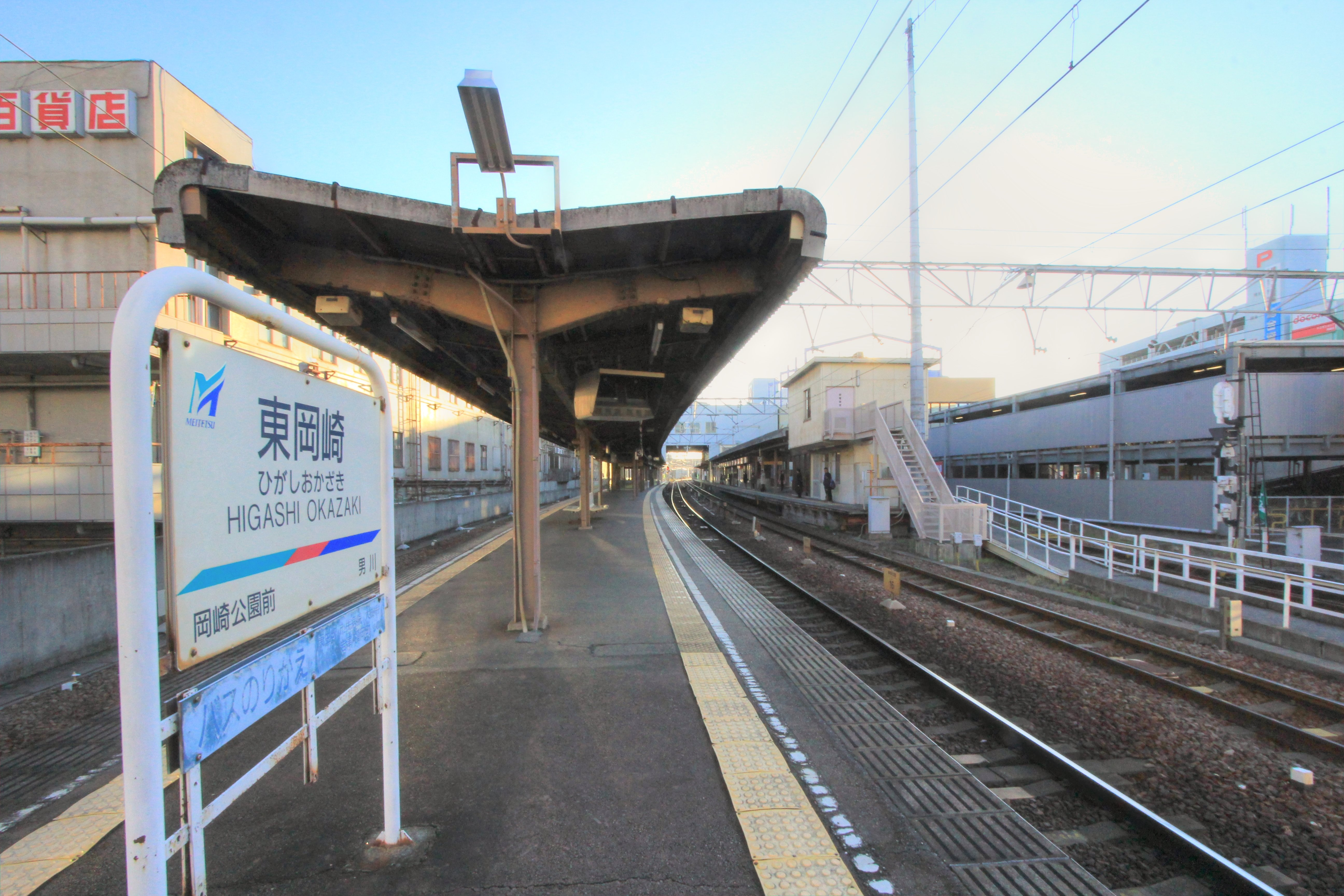
Platforms

Track Layout

Higashi Okazaki Station (東岡崎駅, Higashi Okazaki-eki) is a railway station in the city of Okazaki, Aichi, Japan, operated by Meitetsu.

== Lines ==
Higashi Okazaki Station is served by the Meitetsu Nagoya Main Line, and is 29.8 kilometers from the terminus of the line at Toyohashi Station.

== Station layout ==
The station has two elevated island platforms connected by a footbridge. The station has automated ticket machines, Manaca automated turnstiles and is staffed.

=== Platforms ===
1, 2	■ Meitetsu Nagoya Main Line	For Meitetsu Nagoya
3, 4	■ Meitetsu Nagoya Main Line	For Toyohashi and Toyokawa-inari

== Adjacent stations ==
←	Service	→
Meitetsu Nagoya Main Line
Toyohashi	Rapid Limited Express (快速特急)	Chiryū
Kō	Limited Express (特急)	Shin Anjō
Miai	Express (急行)	Shin Anjō
Otogawa	Semi Express (準急)	Yahagibashi
Otogawa	Local (普通)	Okazakikōen-mae

== Station history ==
Higashi Okazaki Station was opened on 8 August 1923 as a station on the privately held Aichi Electric Railway. The Aichi Electric Railway was acquired by the Meitetsu Group on 1 August 1935.

== Passenger statistics ==
In fiscal 2017, the station was used by an average of 39,675 passengers daily.

== Surrounding area ==
- Okazaki City Hall
- Okazaki Castle

== See also ==
- List of railway stations in Japan
