= Meitetsu Nagoya Station =

Railway station in Nagoya, Japan

Meitetsu Nagoya Station 名鉄名古屋駅

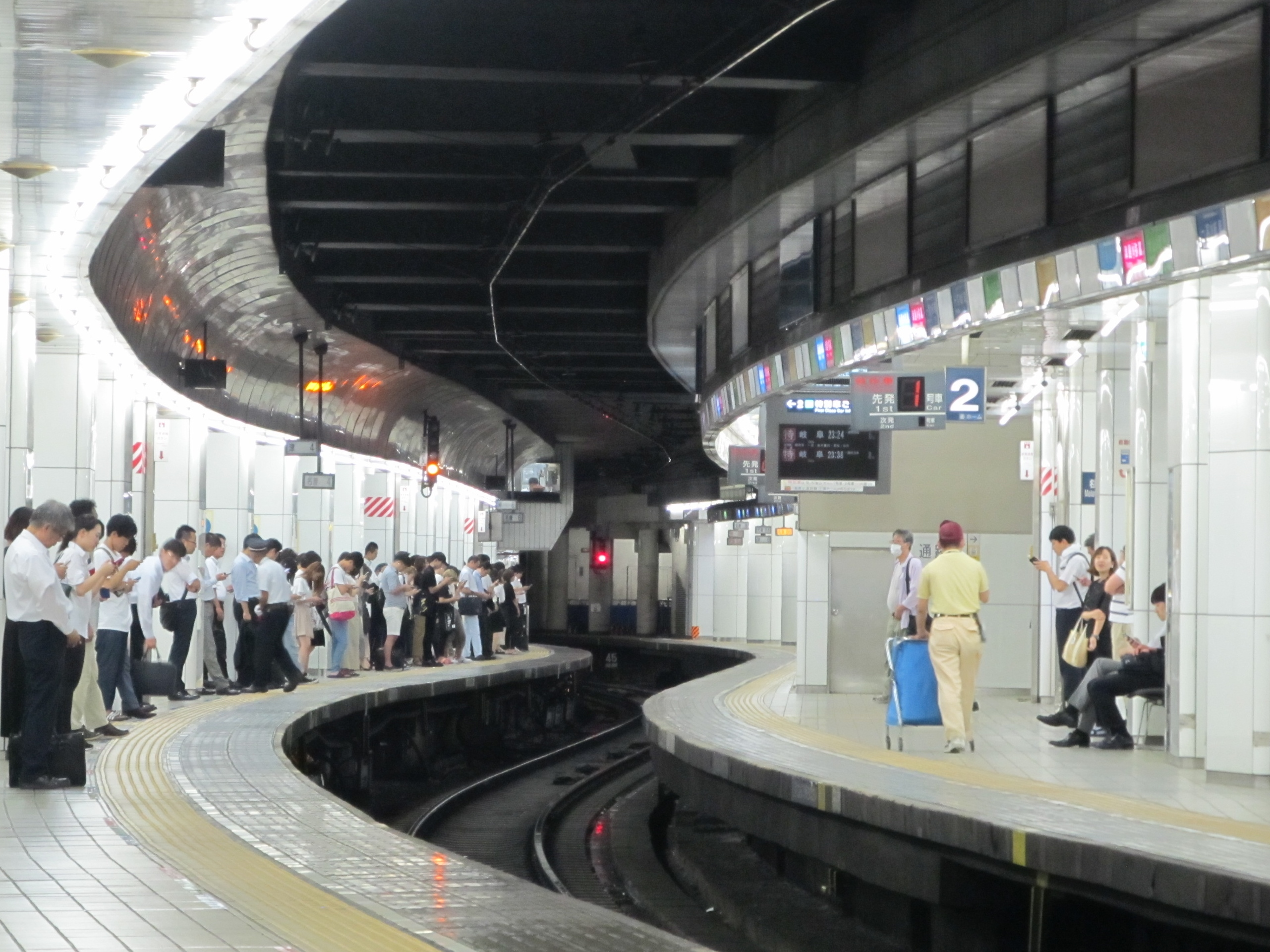
- Platform 1 and 2 in 2018

General information
- Location: Meieki 1-chome, Nakamura-ku, Nagoya, Aichi; Japan
- Coordinates: 35.1695°N 136.8838°E
- Operator: Meitetsu
- Line: Nagoya Main Line
- Platforms: 3 platforms (with Spanish solution), 2 tracks
- Connections: Kintetsu Nagoya Station; Nagoya Station; Meitetsu Bus

Construction
- Structure type: Underground

Other information
- Station code: NH36

History
- Opened: August 12, 1941
- Former names: Shin Nagoya Station (~2005)

Passengers
- 2023–2024: 272,061
Services
Preceding station	Meitetsu	Following station
Sannō towards Toyohashi	Nagoya Main Line Local	Sakō towards Meitetsu Gifu
Kanayama towards Toyohashi	Nagoya Main Line Semi Express Express	Sakō towards Meitetsu Gifu
Kanayama towards Toyohashi	Nagoya Main Line Rapid Express	Sukaguchi towards Meitetsu Gifu
Kanayama towards Toyohashi	Nagoya Main Line Rapid Express	Kami-Otai towards Shin-Unuma
Kanayama towards Toyohashi	Nagoya Main Line Limited Express Rapid Limited Express	Kōnomiya towards Meitetsu Gifu
Kanayama towards Toyohashi	Nagoya Main Line Limited Express Rapid Limited Express	Iwakura towards Shin-Unuma
Kanayama towards Central Japan International Airport	μSky	Kōnomiya towards Meitetsu Gifu
Kanayama towards Central Japan International Airport	μSky	Iwakura towards Shin-Unuma
Location

Meitetsu Nagoya Station (名鉄名古屋駅, Meitetsu Nagoya-eki) is the terminal station of the Nagoya Railroad (Meitetsu) system in Nagoya, Japan. Many trains of Meitetsu's major lines operate through this station. The station is also a gateway to the Chubu Centrair International Airport, which is connected with the station by the Limited Express services.

This station is built under the Meitetsu Department Store. Therefore, the station area is very narrow for the large number of passengers, but it is technically difficult to enlarge the station due to the limited and complicated underground area. Because of this, many services to different destinations with either two-doored or three-doored trains, arrive at two tracks. At this station, passengers' waiting spots are separated by destination. Passengers are required to wait at their spot, marked with the colored lines on the platforms and signs above the other side's platform. The station is adjacent to JR Central's Nagoya Station, the city's central station, and Kintetsu Nagoya Station, the terminal of the Kintetsu Nagoya Line.

The station opened on the new section of the Nagoya Main Line that was built to connect the two separate sections in 1941. The station was only connected to the western section at first, but the eastern section also connected to the station in 1944. Since its opening, the station build has been rebuilt several times due to bombing and fire.

The station, as of 2025, has two side platforms, two tracks, and an island platform used for the Spanish solution. Meitetsu is currently redeveloping the area, which includes the relocation and the expansion of the current station to have four tracks. All trains on the line stop at the station, and have to continue moving on their way, even if the train terminates at this station.

== History ==
Prior to the opening of the Meitetsu Nagoya Station, the Meitetsu Nagoya Main Line was split in east and west, as they were originally two trunk lines formerly owned by two different railway operators. The eastern section was owned by the Aichi Electric Railway, and the western section was owned by the Meigi Railway. Since the formation of Meitetsu in 1935, the two major lines were extended towards each other, forming the current Meitetsu Nagoya Main Line. As a result of this effort, the western part extended to the station first.

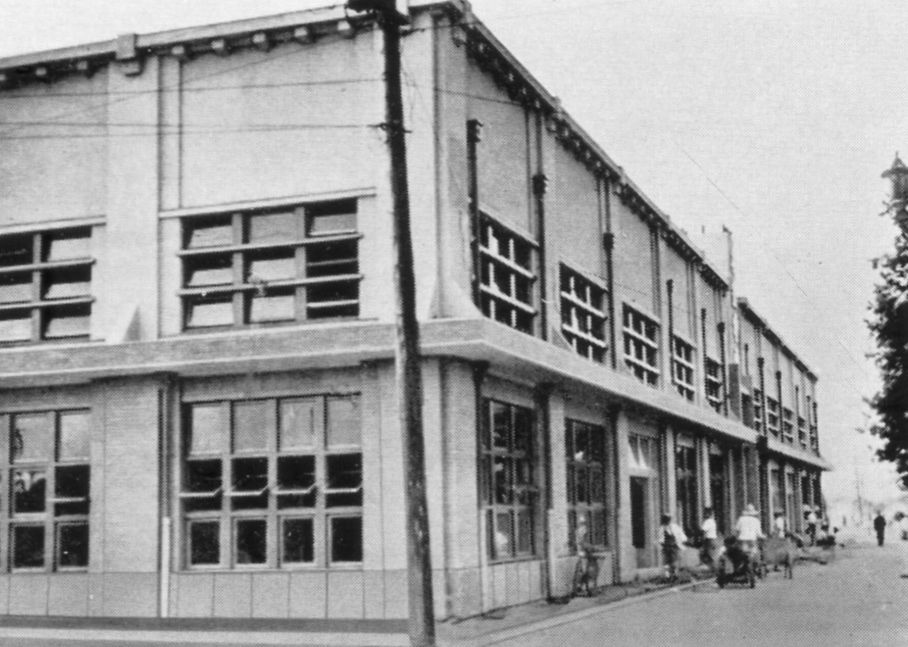
The original terminal building of Meitetsu Nagoya Station (Shin Nagoya Station) in 1941

The station opened on August 12, 1941 and was known as Shin-Nagoya Station (新名古屋駅, Shin-Nagoya-eki) until it was renamed in early 2005, just prior to the opening of Chubu Centrair International Airport. The station originally had three tracks instead of two, with two platforms instead of three. In 1954, the station building was renovated, and the station layout became the one being used. The reason given for why the number of tracks were reduced, was that the underground space around the station was already limited at the time, so Meitetsu decided to separate the boarding and arrival platforms instead, resulting in the third track being removed to make way. The station connected with the eastern part of the Nagoya Main Line in 1944. The original station building survived the Bombing of Nagoya during World War II, but burned down completely due to electrical fault on December 12, 1946. The second station building was completed on April 1, 1950. Due to Kintetsu Nagoya Line changing the rail gauge to standard-gauge, a rail connection with Kintetsu Nagoya Station was removed on December 20, 1952. The station was later refurbished completely in 1987.

=== Future refurbishments ===
In 2019, Meitetsu announced a station refurbishment project which would add two new tracks to increase station capacity. The expansion of the station was considered difficult due to the nearby underground areas being occupied by the nearby Kintetsu Nagoya Station and the subway Nagoya Station. In March 2025, Meitetsu laid out their plans for the reconstruction, estimated to cost about 540 billion yen. Plans called for the construction to begin at the end of fiscal 2025 and last until the 2040s. At the start of the project, the existing Meitetsu Department Store, Meitetsu Grand Hotel and Meitetsu Bus Terminal will be closed and demolished. The end of the first phase of construction, scheduled for fiscal year 2033, will feature the opening of a new bus terminal and the shifting of Meitetsu trains to the two new tracks and platforms. All four tracks are scheduled to be in operation by the end of the project, with plans to have dedicated boarding platforms for μSky limited express services to Chubu Centrair International Airport. In December 2025, the plan was put on hold after the withdrawal of the general contractor, citing manpower shortages.

== Station layout ==
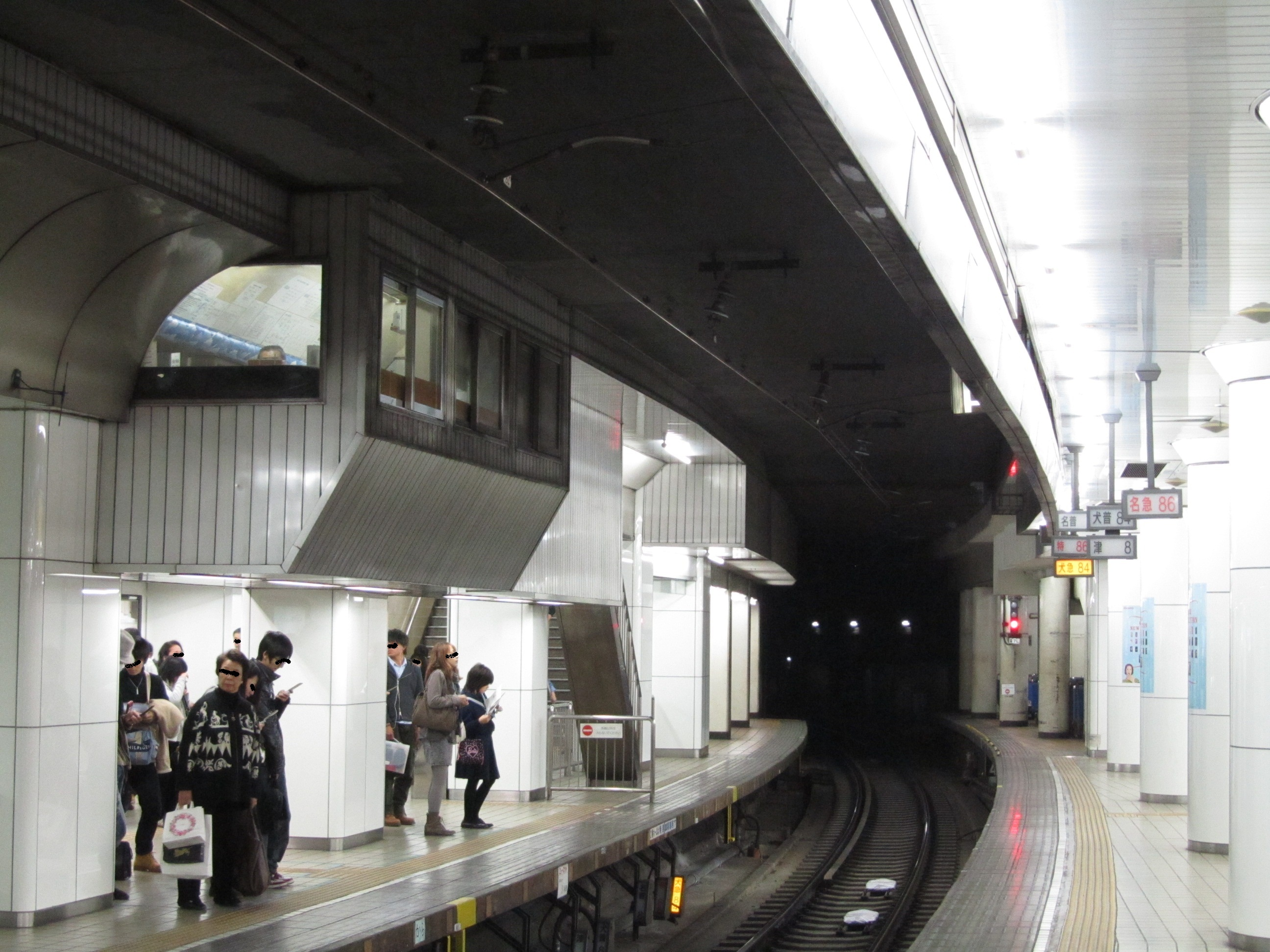
Platform 1 of the station. Note the "DJ Booth" on the top left roof.

The station has two platforms on the side, and a single Spanish solution platform between them. The Spanish solution platform is still used for passengers riding Limited Express services. The station is built underground beneath the Meitetsu Department Store, where most of the ticket gates and transfer gates are located on floor B1 and station platforms are located on floor B2. Due to the extreme service frequency and high number of service variations, automated announcements are not used in this station. Instead, people in the two booths located above the side platforms, nicknamed "DJ Booths", make the announcements. The booths were installed in 1987. At Meitetsu Nagoya Station, passengers' riding spots are complicated by the number of service patterns and destinations. Additionally, Meitetsu has two-door trains and three-door trains, which also increases the patterns of the riding spots. To prevent riders from taking the wrong train, the riding spots are differentiated by colors both on the station platform and the signs above the other side's platform.

1F	Street Level	Exit/Entrance, Meitetsu Department Store
B1F	Concourse	Faregates, ticket machines, station agent, transfer gates
B2F	Side platform, transfer to Kintetsu Nagoya Line
B2F	Platform 1	→ Nagoya Main Line towards Meitetsu Gifu, Tsushima, and Inuyama (Sakō) →
B2F	Platform 2	→ (Same as platform 1, paid cars only) →
B2F	Island platform used for Spanish solution
B2F	Platform 3	← (Same as platform 4, paid cars only) ←
B2F	Platform 4	← Nagoya Main Line towards Toyohashi, Hekinan, Toyotashi, Kōwa, and Central Japan International Airport (Sannō) ←
B2F	Side platform, one-way ticket gates

== Services ==
While the Meitetsu Nagoya Station is technically only served by the Meitetsu Nagoya Main Line, trains heading to many destinations arrive and depart at the station. These lines include the Tsushima Line, Inuyama Line, Kowa Line, Tokoname Line, Airport Line, Chita New Line, and Mikawa Line. As of 2025, the station is serviced by trains from 5:23 a.m. to 12:07 a.m. All services on the Nagoya Main line stop at the station. The station is one of the busiest stations with around 450 trains departing on each track a day. The average interval between trains is two minutes and thirty seconds. Due to the high number of arriving trains per track, no services terminate at this station and instead continue in the direction they were heading.

The station is connected to Kintetsu Nagoya Station by underground walkways. Other stations named Nagoya, those operated by JR Central, Nagoya Municipal Subway, or Aonami Line's Nagoya Station are also adjacent to this station. Meitetsu Bus Center, operated by Meitetsu Bus is located nearby the station.
