= Ano Ichirizuka =

- 阿野一里塚 (Japanese)
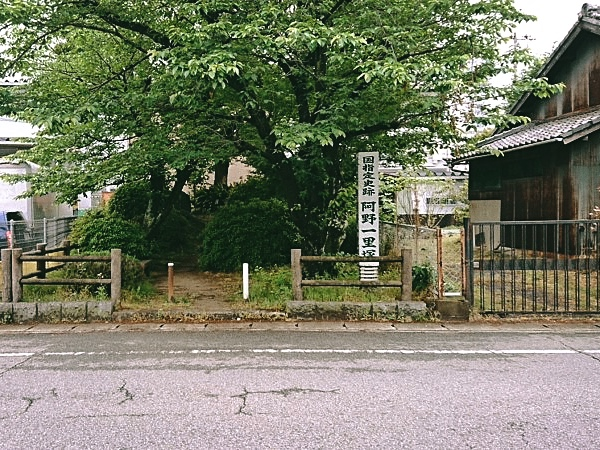
- Ano Ichirizuka

- Ano Ichirizuka Ano Ichirizuka (Japan)
- 35°02′52″N 137°00′12″E
- Periods: Edo period
- Location: Toyoake, Aichi, Japan
- Region: Tōkai region

History
- Built: 1604

Site notes
- Public access: Yes

The Ano Ichirizuka (阿野一里塚) is a pair of Japanese distance markers akin to a milestone, consisting of two earthen mounds flanking the route of the old Tōkaidō highway located in what is now part of the city of Toyoake, Aichi Prefecture in the Tōkai region of Japan. It was designated a National Historic Site of Japan in 1936.

== Overview ==
During the Edo period Tokugawa shogunate established ichirizuka on major roads, enabling calculation both of distance travelled and of the charge for transportation by kago or palanquin. These mounds, denoted the distance in ri 3.927 kilometres (2.440 mi) to Nihonbashi, the "Bridge of Japan", erected in Edo in 1603. They were typically planted with an enoki or Japanese red pine to provide shelter for travelers. Since the Meiji period, most of the ichirizuka have disappeared, having been destroyed by the elements, modern highway construction and urban encroachment. In 1876, the "Ichirizuka Abolition decree" was issued by the Meiji government and many were demolished at that time. Currently, 17 surviving ichirizuka are designated as national historic sites.

In the case of the Ano ichirizuka, the mounds flank the Tōkaidō, the main highway connecting Edo with Kyoto and are located between Chiryū-juku in Mikawa Province and Narumi-juku in Owari Province. This ichirizuka was the 86th marker from Nihonbashi, and is a rare case on the Tōkaidō where both of the mounds have survived. These markers were constructed in 1604.The site is about a 15-minute walk from Zengo Station on the Meitetsu Nagoya Main Line.

== See also ==
- List of Historic Sites of Japan (Aichi)
