= Horita Station =

Horita Station is the name of two rail stations in Mizuho-ku, Nagoya, Aichi, Japan:

- Horita Station (Meitetsu) on the Meitetsu Nagoya Main Line
- Horita Station (Nagoya Municipal Subway) on the Meijō Line
