= Chūkyō-keibajō-mae Station =

Railway station in Nagoya, Japan

Chūkyō-keibajō-mae Station 中京競馬場前駅

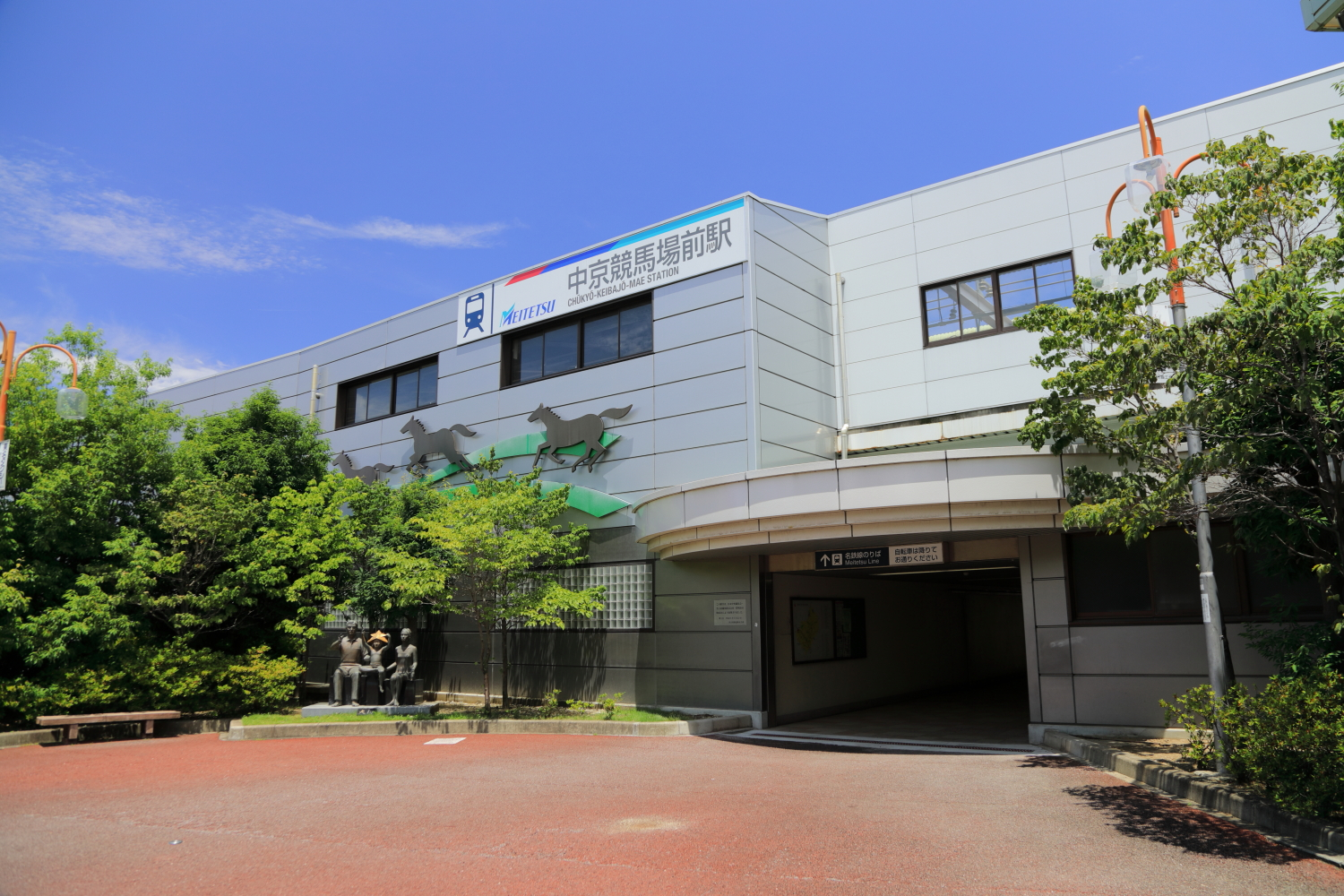
- Chūkyō-keibajō-mae Station, South entrance, June 2018

General information
- Location: 2 Taishogane, Midori-ku, Nagoya-shi, Aichi-ken 458-0822; Japan
- Coordinates: 35.0614°N 136.9815°E
- Operator: Meitetsu
- Line: ■ Meitetsu Nagoya Line
- Distance: 51.4 kilometers from Toyohashi
- Platforms: 2 side platforms

Other information
- Status: Staffed
- Station code: NH24
- Website: Official website

History
- Opened: 15 July 1953; 73 years ago

Passengers
- FY2017: 9470
Location
- Location within Aichi Prefecture Location within Japan

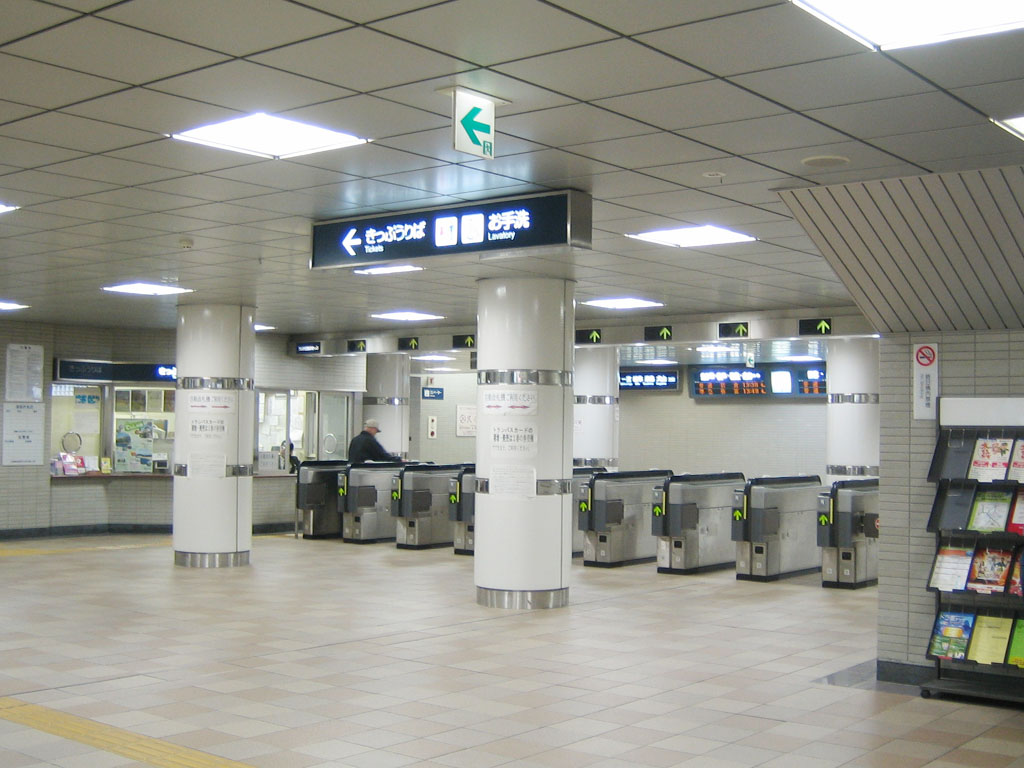
Ticket gate

Chūkyō-keibajō-mae Station (中京競馬場前駅, Chūkyō-keibajō-mae-eki) is a railway station in Midori-ku, Nagoya, Aichi Prefecture, Japan, operated by Meitetsu.

== Lines ==
Chūkyō-keibajō-mae Station is served by the Meitetsu Nagoya Main Line and is located 51.4 kilometers from the terminus of the line at Toyohashi Station.

== Station layout ==
The station has two elevated side platforms, with the station building situated beneath the tracks. The station has automated ticket machines, Manaca automated turnstiles, and is staffed.

=== Platforms ===
1	■ Meitetsu Nagoya Main Line	For Kanayama and Meitetsu-Nagoya
2	■ Meitetsu Nagoya Main Line	For Higashi Okazaki and Toyohashi

== Adjacent stations ==
←	Service	→
Meitetsu Nagoya Main Line
Limited Express (特急): Does not stop at this station
Express (急行): Does not stop at this station
Zengo	Semi Express (準急)	Arimatsu
Zengo	Local (普通)	Arimatsu

== Station history ==
Chūkyō-keibajō-mae Station was opened on 15 July 1953.

== Passenger statistics ==
In fiscal 2017, the station was used by an average of 9470 passengers daily.

== Surrounding area ==
- Chukyo Racecourse
- Nagoya College

== See also ==
- List of railway stations in Japan
