= Arimatsu Station =

Railway station in Nagoya, Japan

Arimatsu Station 有松駅

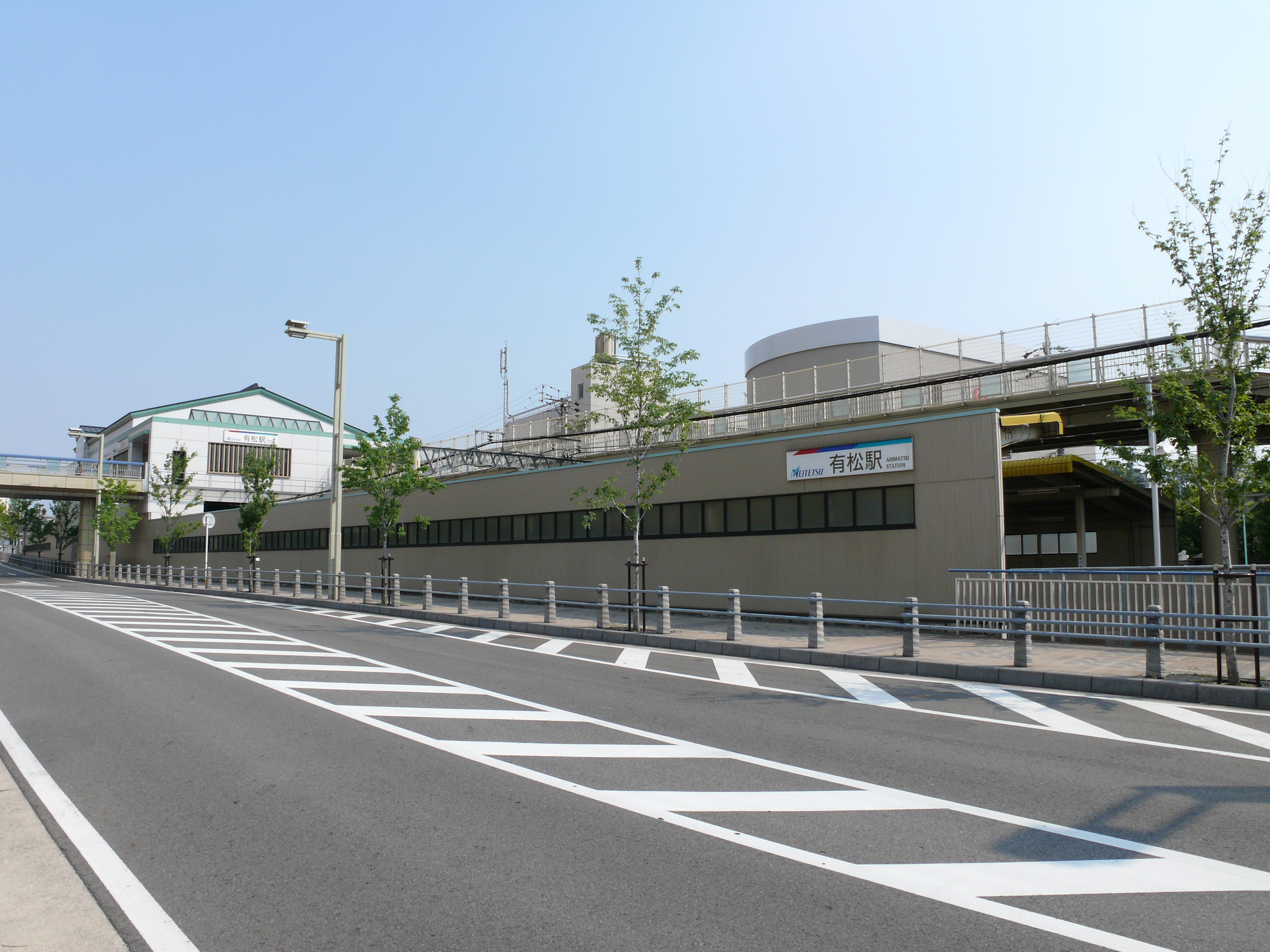
- Arimatsu Station, May 2007

General information
- Location: 2102 Arimatsu, Midori-ku, Nagoya-shi, Aichi-ken 458-0924; Japan
- Coordinates: 35.0675°N 136.9711°E
- Operator: Meitetsu
- Line: ■ Meitetsu Nagoya Line
- Distance: 52.7 kilometers from Toyohashi
- Platforms: 2 side platforms

Other information
- Status: Staffed
- Station code: NH25
- Website: Official website

History
- Opened: 8 May 1917; 109 years ago
- Former names: Arimatsu-ura (until 1943)

Passengers
- FY2017: 7243
Location
- Location within Aichi Prefecture Location within Japan

Arimatsu Station (有松駅, Arimatsu-eki) is a railway station in Midori-ku, Nagoya, Aichi Prefecture, Japan, operated by Meitetsu.

== Lines ==
Arimatsu Station is served by the Meitetsu Nagoya Main Line and is 52.7 kilometers from the terminus of the line at Toyohashi Station.

== Station layout ==
The station has two elevated side platforms with the station building underneath. The station has automated ticket machines, Manaca automated turnstiles and is staffed.

=== Platforms ===
1	■ Meitetsu Nagoya Main Line	For Kanayama and Meitetsu-Nagoya
2	■ Meitetsu Nagoya Main Line	For Higashi Okazaki and Toyohashi

== Adjacent stations ==
←	Service	→
Meitetsu Nagoya Main Line
Limited Express (特急): Does not stop at this station
Zengo	Express (急行) (some trains stop)	Narumi
Chūkyō-keibajō-mae	Semi Express (準急)	Narumi
Chūkyō-keibajō-mae	Local (普通)	Sakyōyama

== Station history ==
Arimatsu Station was opened on 8 May 1917, as Arimatsu-ura Station (有松裏駅, Arimatsu-ura-eki) on the Aichi Electric Railway. On 1 April 1935, the Aichi Electric Railway merged with the Nagoya Railroad (the forerunner of present-day Meitetsu). The station was renamed to its present name on 1 November 1943. The station building was rebuilt from 2000 to 2001.

== Passenger statistics ==
In fiscal 2017, the station was used by an average of 7243 passengers daily.

== Surrounding area ==
- site of the Battle of Okehazama
- former Arimatsu Town Hall

== See also ==
- List of railway stations in Japan
