= Fujita Health University =

Private university in Toyoake, Aichi, Japan

- 藤田医科大学
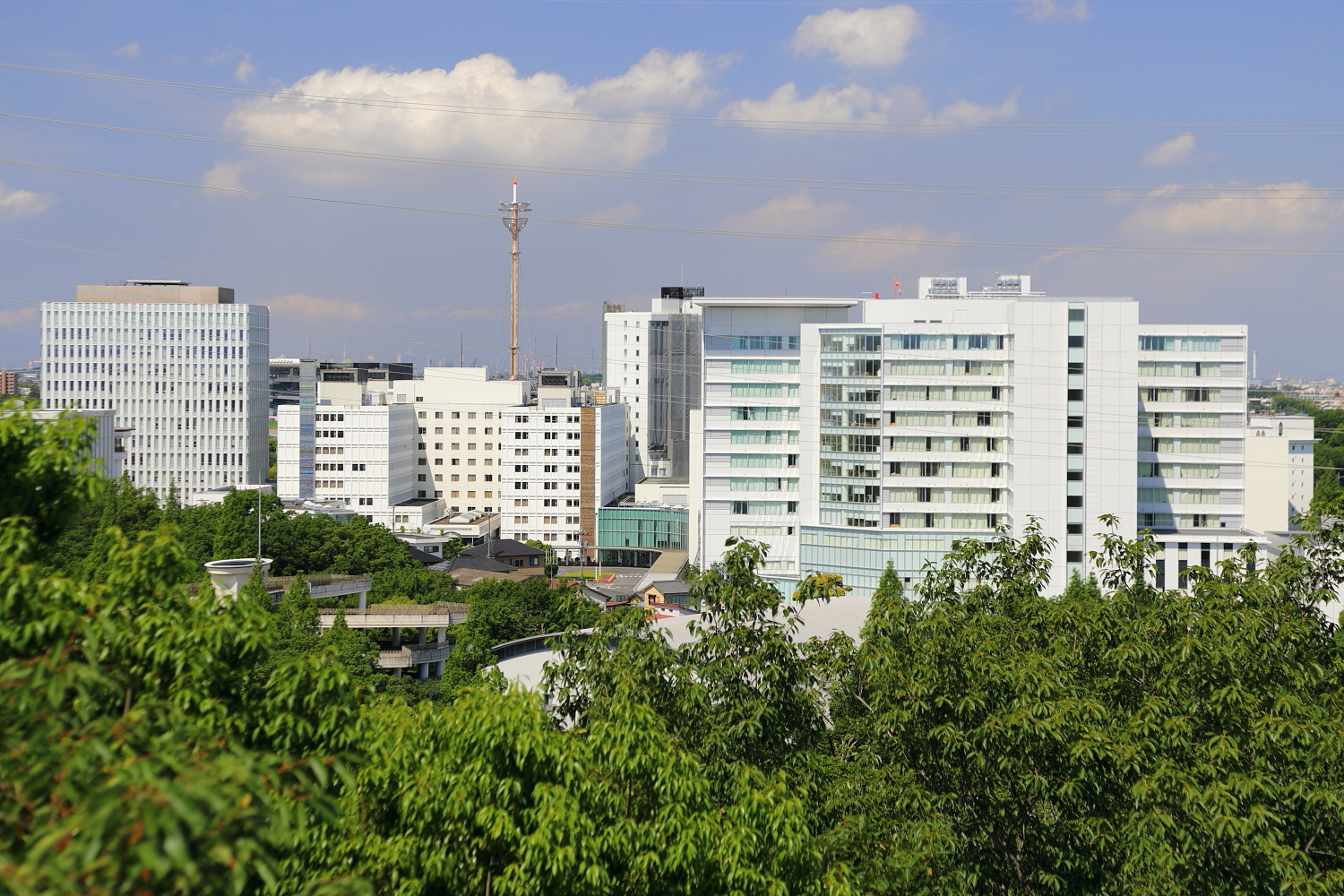
- Distant View of Fujita Health University (2018)
- Motto: 独創一理
- Motto in English: Our Creativity For The People
- Type: Private
- Established: September 1964
- Location: Toyoake, Aichi, Japan; 35.071°N 137.001°E
- Website: www.fujita-hu.ac.jp/en/

Fujita Health University (藤田医科大学, Fujita Ika Daigaku) (abbr. FHU) is a private university at Toyoake, Aichi, Japan. The predecessor of the school was founded in 1964 by Dr. Keisuke Fujita, and it was chartered as a university in 1968. It was ranked tied for 11th place among all Japanese universities and for 1st place among private universities in the 2018 Times Higher Education (THE) World University Ranking.

As of 2021, the university is the largest single medical facility in Japan with 1,376 beds.

== Organization ==
=== Faculties ===
- School of Medicine
  - Faculty of Medicine
- School of Medical Sciences
  - Faculty of Medical Technology
  - Faculty of Radiological Technology
- School of Health Sciences
  - Faculty of Nursing
  - Faculty of Rehabilitation

=== Graduate school ===
- Graduate School of Medicine
- Graduate School of Health Sciences

=== College ===
- Medical Technology Course *Closed in 2010
- Medical Information Systems Course *Closed in 2010

=== Academy of Nursing ===
- Nursing Course (3-year full-time course) *Closed in March 2022

=== Library ===
- Fujita Health Sciences Library

=== Affiliated Institutions ===
- Research Promotion Headquarters
  - International Center for Cell and Gene Therapy
  - Cancer Center
  - International Center for Brain Science (ICBS)
  - Center for Infectious Disease Research
  - Center for Medical Science
  - Open Facility Center
  - Advanced Medical Research Center for Animal Models of Human Diseases
  - Development Office for Genomic Medical Research Center
  - Office of Research Administration (ORA)
  - Office of Research and Review
  - Research Support Department
  - Center for Collaboration in Research and Innovation
  - University Startup Promotion Office
  - Drug Development Support Office
  - Research Center for Implementation Nursing Science Initiative
  - Center for Co-innovation
  - Research Center for Robotic Smart Home & Activity Assistive Technology
  - Health Data Architecture Center (HDAC)
  - Open Innovation Promotion Office
  - Center for Translational Research
  - Bioresource Room
  - Office of Biostatistics
  - Center for Translational Research Support Education
  - Center for Clinical Trial and Research Support

=== Hospitals ===
- Fujita Health University Hospital
- Fujita Health University Banbuntane Hospital
- Fujita Health University Nanakuri Memorial Hospital
- Fujita Health University Okazaki Medical Center
- Fujita Medical Innovation Center Tokyo
- Fujita Health University Central Japan Airport Clinic

== International Collaboration ==
- Khon Kaen University, (Thailand)
- University of Milan Bicocca, Italy
- Gachon University, South Korea
- National Taiwan University College of Medicine (Taiwan)
