= Narumi Station =

Railway station in Nagoya, Japan

Narumi Station 鳴海駅

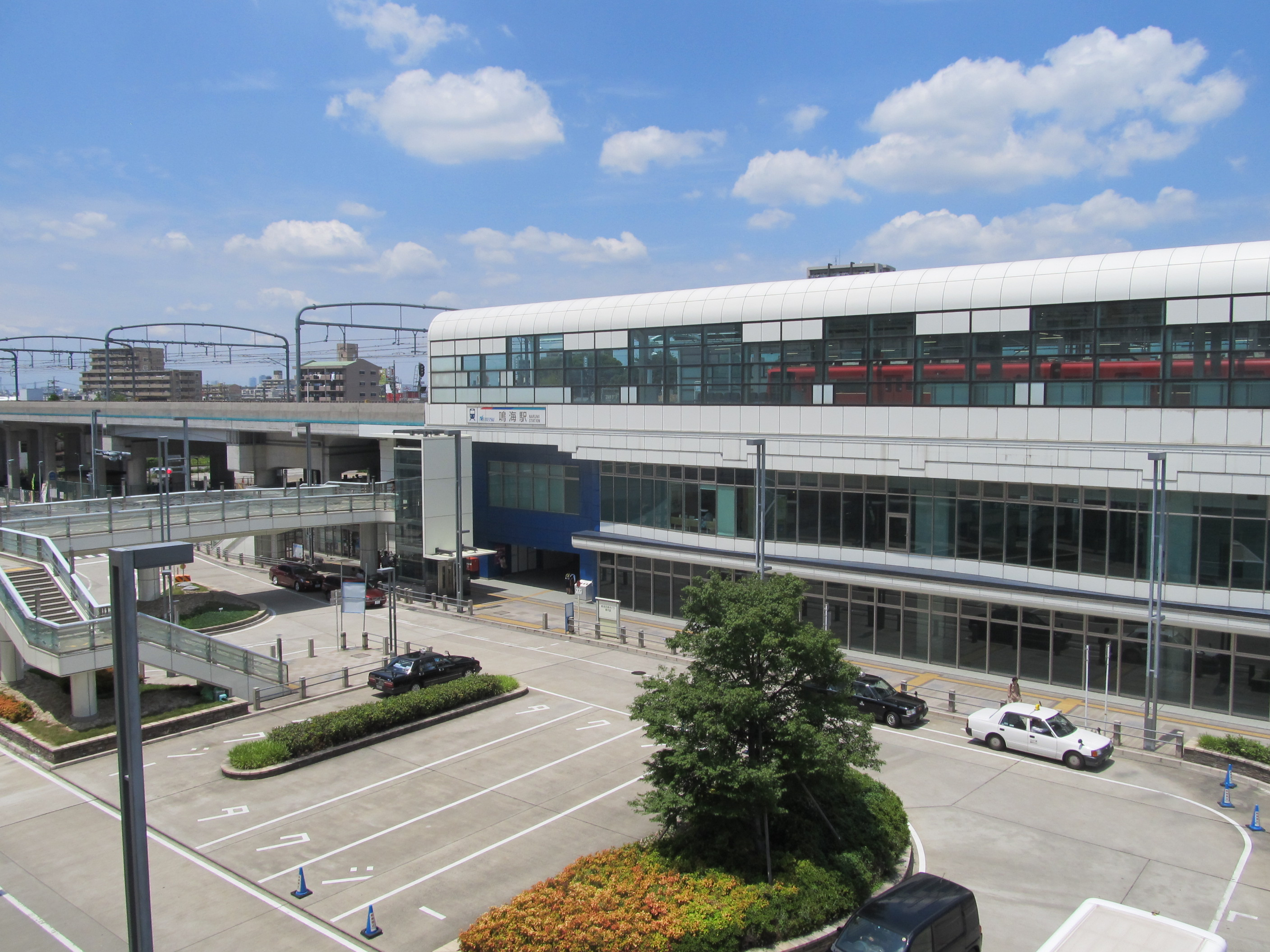
- Narumi Station, June 2014

General information
- Location: Narumi-cho 1-3, Midori-ku, Nagoya-shi, Aichi-ken 458-0831; Japan
- Coordinates: 35.0785°N 136.9508°E
- Operator: Meitetsu
- Line: ■ Meitetsu Nagoya Line
- Distance: 55.1 kilometers from Toyohashi
- Platforms: 2 island platforms

Other information
- Status: Staffed
- Station code: NH27
- Website: Official website

History
- Opened: 8 May 1917; 109 years ago

Passengers
- FY2017: 9472
Location
- Location within Aichi Prefecture Location within Japan

Track Layout

Narumi Station (鳴海駅, Narumi-eki) is a railway station in Midori-ku, Nagoya, Aichi Prefecture, Japan, operated by Meitetsu.

== Lines ==
Narumi Station is served by the Meitetsu Nagoya Main Line and is 55.1 kilometers from the terminus of the line at Toyohashi Station.

== Station layout ==
The station has two elevated island platforms with the station building underneath. The station has automated ticket machines, Manaca automated turnstiles and is staffed.

=== Platforms ===
1, 2	■ Meitetsu Nagoya Main Line	For Kanayama and Meitetsu-Nagoya
3, 4	■ Meitetsu Nagoya Main Line	For Higashi Okazaki and Toyohashi

== Adjacent stations ==
←	Service	→
Meitetsu Nagoya Main Line
Chiryū	Limited Express (特急) (Some trains stop)	Jingū-mae
Zengo	Express (急行)	Horita
Arimatsu	Semi Express (準急)	Horita
Sakyōyama	Local (普通)	Moto Hoshizaki

== Station history ==
Narumi Station was opened on 8 May 1917 as a station on the Aichi Electric Railway. On 1 April 1935, the Aichi Electric Railway merged with the Nagoya Railroad (the forerunner of present-day Meitetsu). The tracks were elevated from 2004 to 2006, and a new station building was built.

== Passenger statistics ==
In fiscal 2017, the station was used by an average of 9472 passengers daily.

== Surrounding area ==
- Narumi Elementary School
- former Narumi Town Hall
- Narumi Jinja
- Japan National Route 1

== See also ==
- List of railway stations in Japan
