= Toyoake Station =

Railway station in Toyoake, Aichi Prefecture, Japan

Toyoake Station 豊明駅

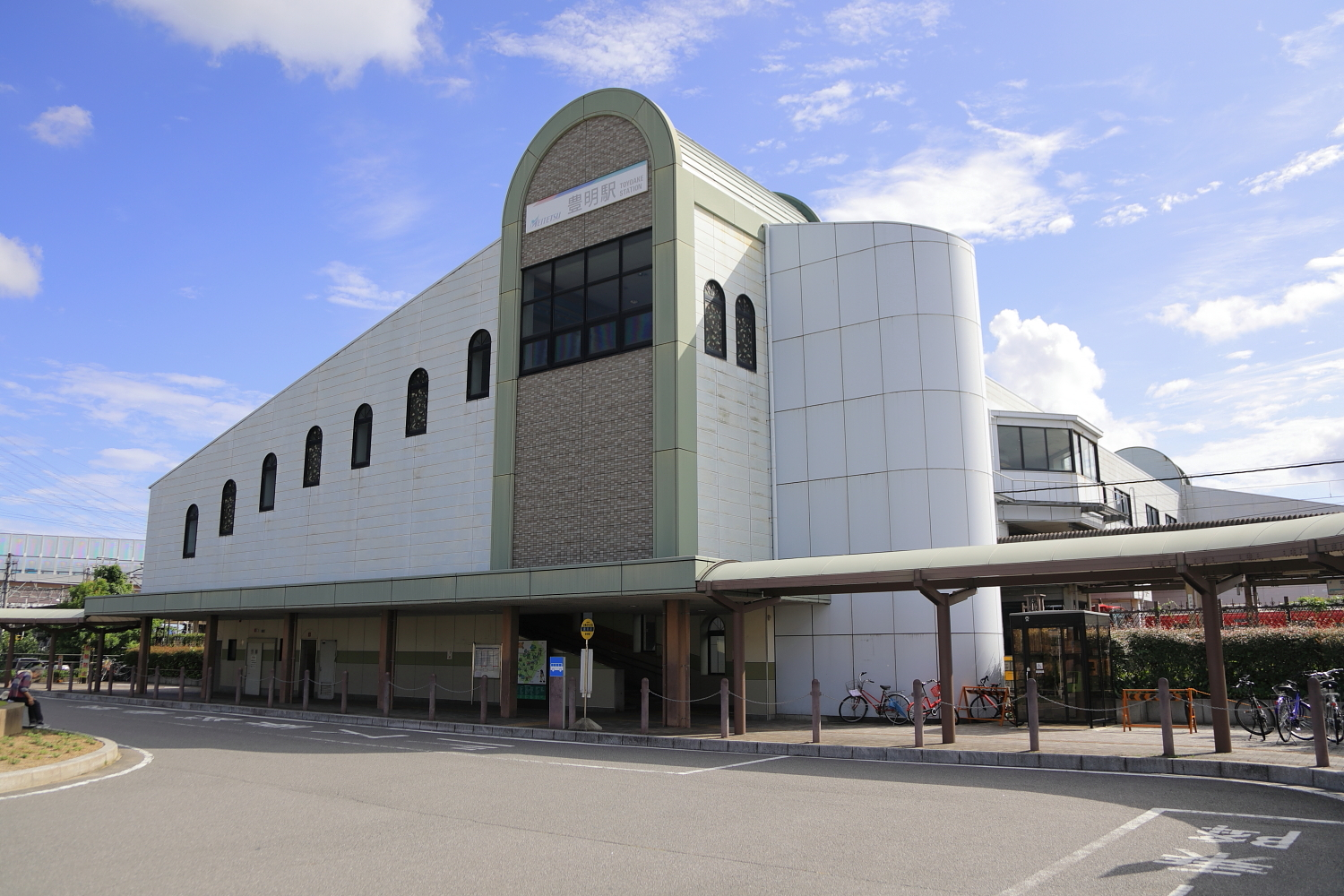
- Toyoake Station (North Gate), July 2018

General information
- Location: Myōjō-131 Anochō, Toyoake-shi, Aichi-ken 470-1141; Japan
- Coordinates: 35.0416°N 137.0083°E
- Operator: Meitetsu
- Line: ■ Meitetsu Nagoya Line
- Distance: 48.1 kilometers from Toyohashi
- Platforms: 3 island platforms

Other information
- Status: Staffed
- Station code: NH22
- Website: Official website

History
- Opened: 1 April 1925; 101 years ago
- Former names: Ano (to 1956)

Passengers
- FY2015: 2,419
Location
- Location within Aichi Prefecture Location within Japan

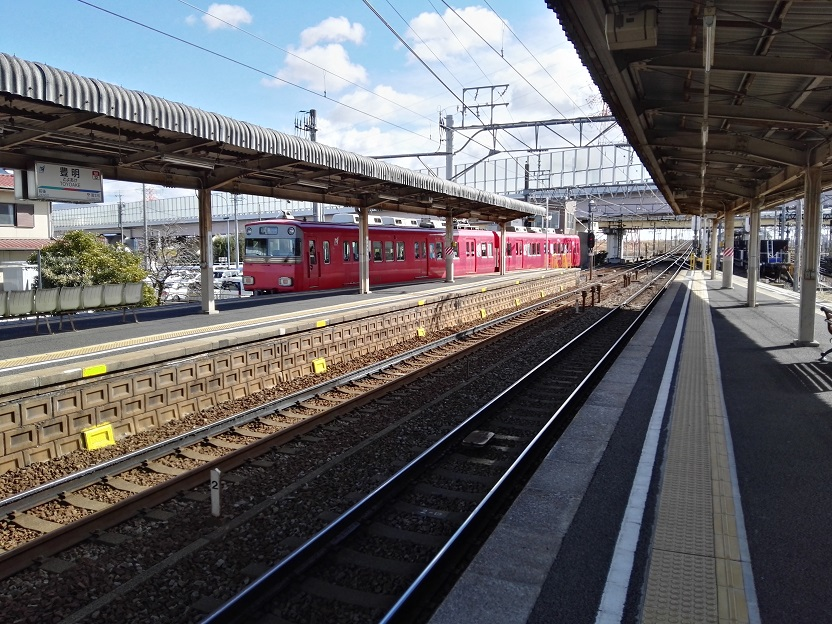
Platforms

Track layout

Toyoake Station (豊明駅, Toyoake-eki) is a railway station in the city of Toyoake, Aichi Prefecture, Japan, operated by Meitetsu.

== Lines ==
Toyoake Station is served by the Meitetsu Nagoya Main Line and is 48.1 kilometers from the terminus of the line at Toyohashi Station.

== Station layout ==
The station has three elevated island platforms connected by a footbridge with the station building underneath. The station has automated ticket machines, Manaca automated turnstiles and is staffed.

=== Platforms ===
| 1 | ■ Meitetsu Nagoya Main Line | For Meitetsu Nagoya, Meitetsu Gifu and Inuyama |
| 2 | ■ Meitetsu Nagoya Main Line | For Meitetsu Nagoya, Meitetsu Gifu and Inuyama |
| 3 | ■ Meitetsu Nagoya Main Line | For Meitetsu Nagoya, Meitetsu Gifu and Inuyama |
| 4 | ■ Meitetsu Nagoya Main Line | For Meitetsu Nagoya, Meitetsu Gifu and Inuyama |
| 5 | ■ Meitetsu Nagoya Main Line | For Higashi Okazaki and Toyohashi |
| 6 | ■ Meitetsu Nagoya Main Line | For Higashi Okazaki and Toyohashi |

== Adjacent stations ==
| ← | Service | → |
Meitetsu Nagoya Main Line
| Chiryū | Express (急行) (Some trains stop) | Zengo |
| Chiryū | Semi Express (準急) | Zengo |
| Fujimatsu | Local (普通) | Zengo |

== Station history ==
Toyoake Station was opened on 1 April 1925 as Ano Station (阿野駅, Ano-eki) on the Aichi Electric Railway. On 1 April 1935, the Aichi Electric Railway merged with the Nagoya Railroad (the forerunner of present-day Meitetsu). The station was renamed to its present name on 1 September 1956. The station building was reconstructed in 1999.

== Passenger statistics ==
In fiscal 2015, the station was used by an average of 2419 passengers daily.

== Surrounding area ==
- Japan National Route 1

== See also ==
- List of railway stations in Japan
