= Aichi Korean Middle and High School =

North Korea-affiliated school in Japan

- 愛知朝鮮中高級学校 아이찌조선중고급학교

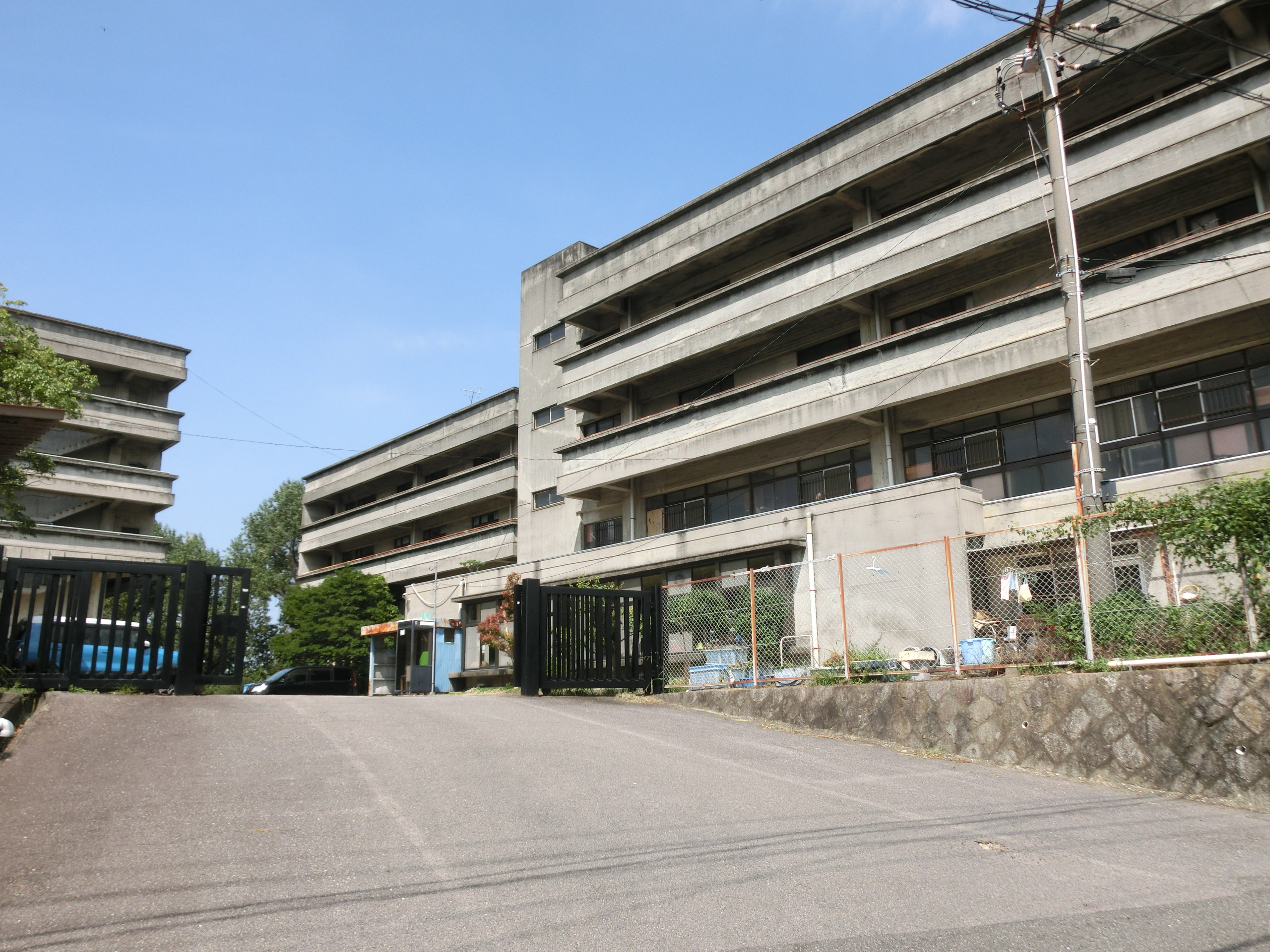
- Aichi Korean Middle and High School in 2017.

Location
- 55 Minamiyakata, Sakae-chō; Toyoake, Aichi Prefecture, 470-1168; Japan; 35°03′29″N 136°58′37″E

Information
- Type: Private Korean school
- Established: 1948
- Grades: Middle and high school
- Enrollment: 277 (as of 2014)
- Website: aichi-korean-junior-and-senior-high-school-2.jimdosite.com

Aichi Korean Middle and High School (愛知朝鮮中高級学校, Aichi Chōsen Chūkōkyūgakkō) (Korean: 아이찌조선중고급학교) is a North Korea-aligned Korean international school in Toyoake, Aichi Prefecture, Japan, in the Nagoya metropolitan area. As of 2013, the principal is Hwang In-suk.

As of 2013, many students are officially stateless (due to them being assigned the Chōsen-seki); some of them are South Korean citizens and some are naturalized Japanese citizens. Overall most students are fourth and/or fifth generation Zainichi Koreans. As of the same year, students who are close to graduating take trips to North Korea.

== Notable alumni ==
- Jong Tae-se (football/soccer player)
