= Sakyōyama Station =

Railway station in Nagoya, Japan

Sakyōyama Station 左京山駅

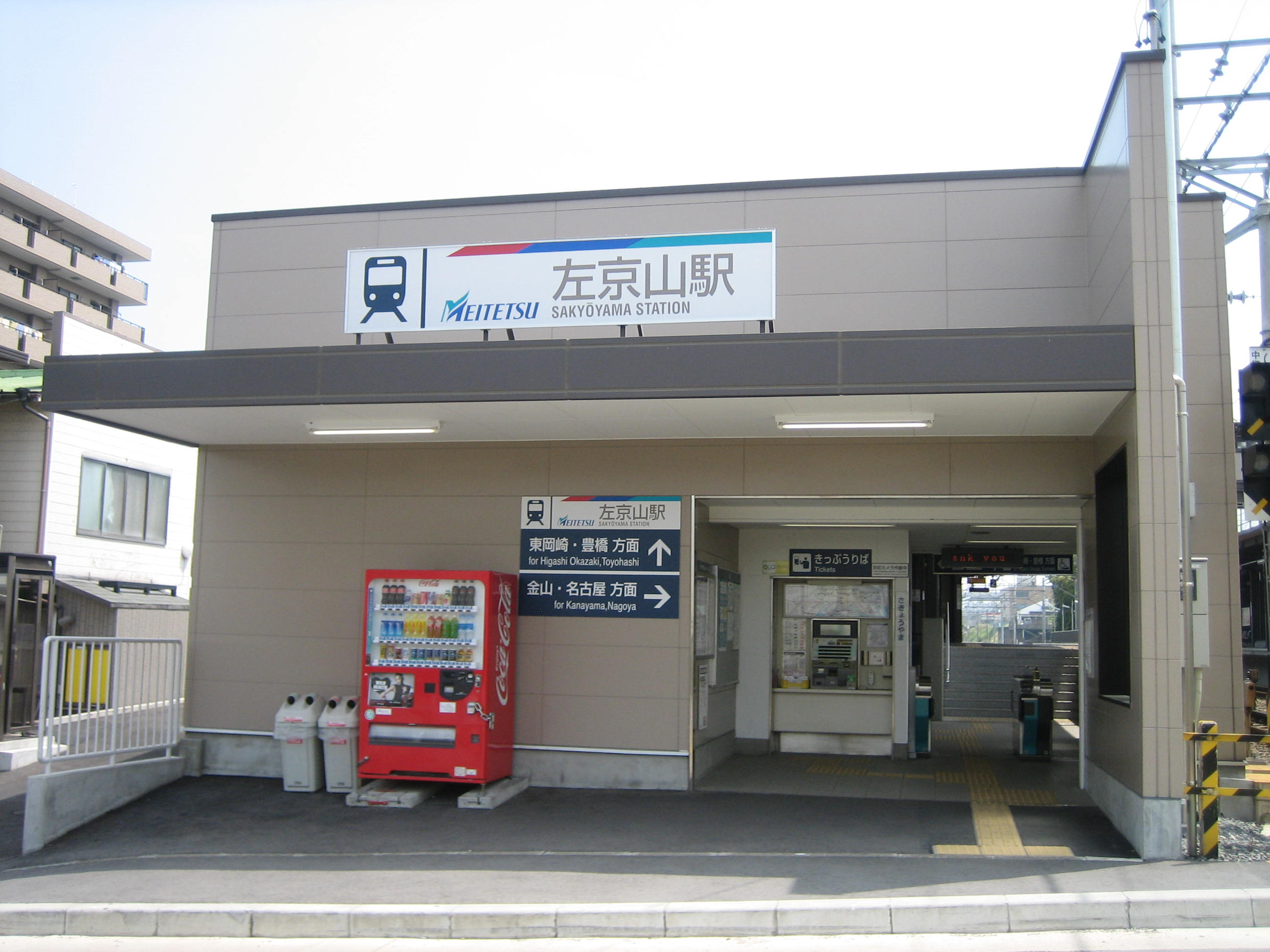
- Sakyōyama Station in April 2009

General information
- Location: 405 Sakyōyama, Midori-ku, Nagoya-shi, Aichi-ken 458-0825; Japan
- Coordinates: 35.0704°N 136.9601°E
- Operator: Meitetsu
- Line: ■ Meitetsu Nagoya Line
- Distance: 53.8 kilometers from Toyohashi
- Platforms: 2 side platforms

Other information
- Status: Unstaffed
- Station code: NH26
- Website: Official website

History
- Opened: 5 November 1942; 83 years ago

Passengers
- FY2017: 2383
Location
- Location within Aichi Prefecture Location within Japan

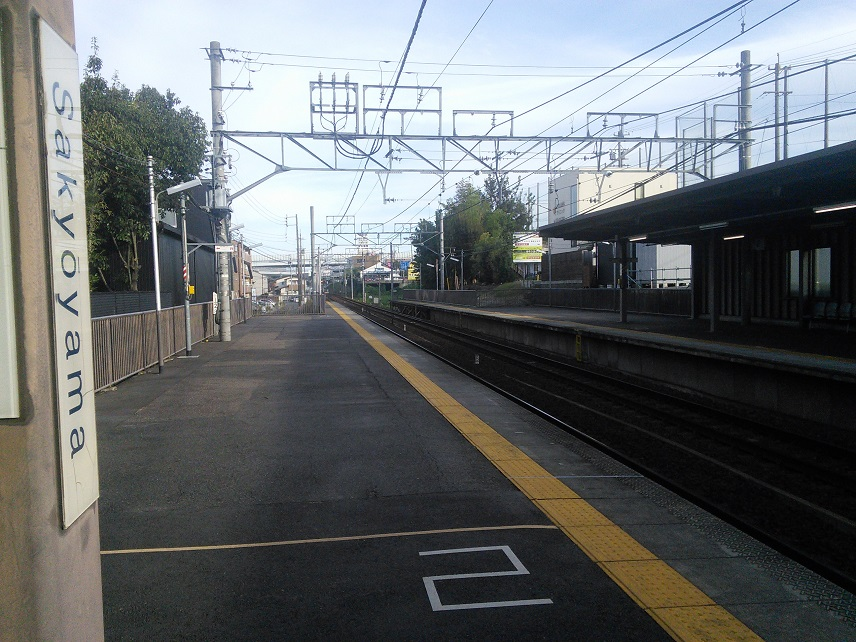
Platforms

Sakyōyama Station (左京山駅, Sakyōyama-eki) is a railway station in Midori-ku, Nagoya, Aichi Prefecture, Japan, operated by Meitetsu.

== Lines ==
Sakyōyama Station is served by the Meitetsu Nagoya Main Line and is 53.8 kilometers from the terminus of the line at Toyohashi Station.

== Station layout ==
The station has two side platforms connected to the station building by a footbridge. The station has automated ticket machines, Manaca automated turnstiles and is unattended.

=== Platforms ===
1	■ Meitetsu Nagoya Main Line	For Kanayama and Meitetsu-Nagoya
2	■ Meitetsu Nagoya Main Line	For Higashi Okazaki and Toyohashi

== Adjacent stations ==
←	Service	→
Meitetsu Nagoya Main Line
Limited Express (特急): Does not stop at this station
Express (急行): Does not stop at this station
Arimatsu	Semi Express (準急) (only one train stops)	Narumi
Arimatsu	Local (普通)	Narumi

== Station history ==
Sakyōyama Station was opened on 5 November 1942.

== Passenger statistics ==
In fiscal 2017, the station was used by an average of 2383 passengers daily.

== Surrounding area ==
- Midori-ku Ward Office
- Japan National Route 1

== See also ==
- List of railway stations in Japan
