= Toyoake =

Toyoake 豊明市
- City
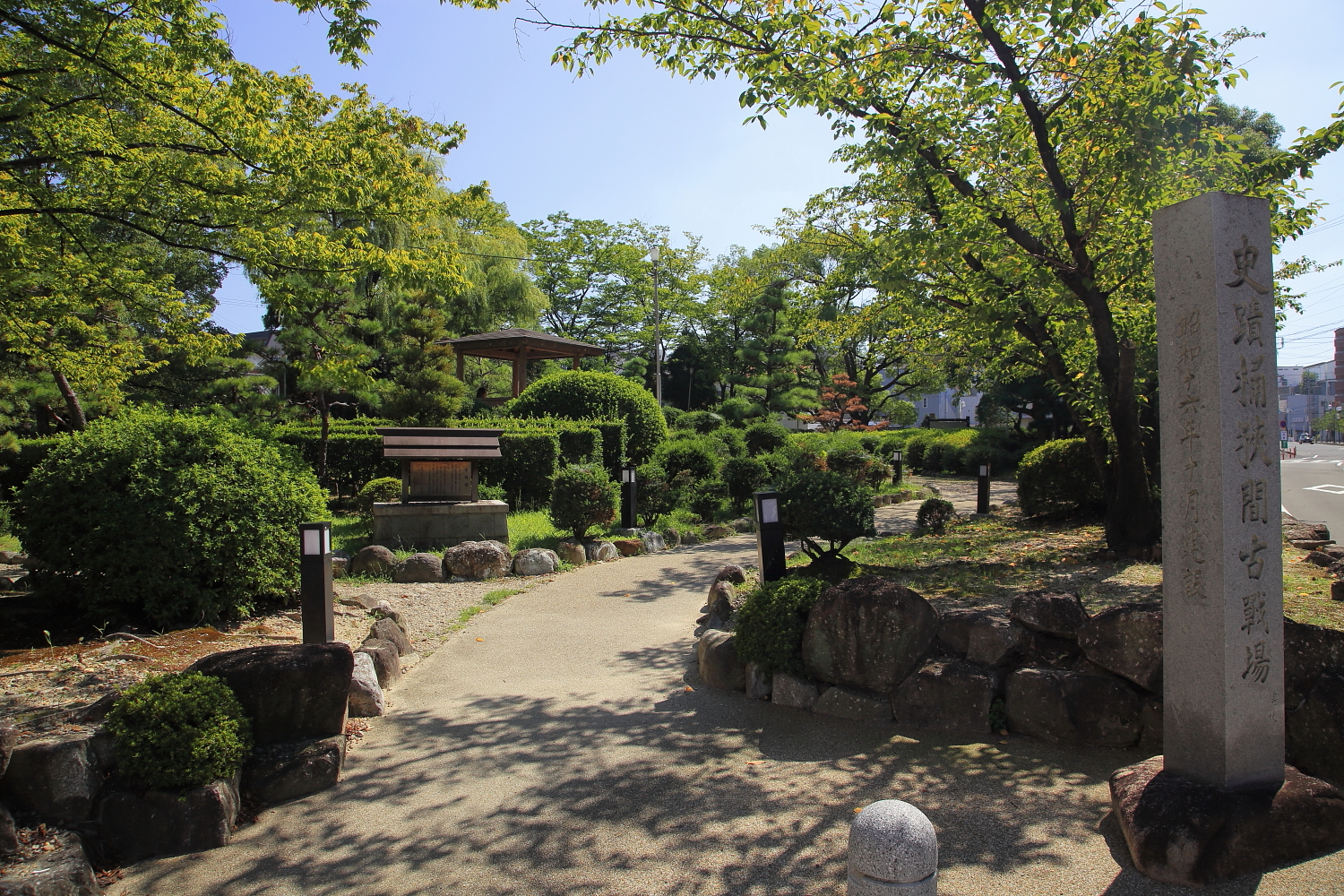
- Okehazama Old Battlefield

- Flag Seal

- Location of Toyoake in Aichi Prefecture

- Coordinates: 35°03′3.1″N 137°0′46.2″E
- Country: Japan
- Region: Chūbu (Tōkai)
- Prefecture: Aichi

Government
  - Mayor: Hidekatsu Aiba

Area
  - Total: 23.22 km^{2} (8.97 sq mi)

Population (October 1, 2019)
  - Total: 69,525
  - Density: 2,994/km^{2} (7,755/sq mi)
- Time zone: UTC+9 (Japan Standard Time)
- Tree: Zelkova
- Flower: Sunflower
- Phone number: 0562-92-1111
- Address: 1-1 Komochimatsu, Shinden-chō, Toyoake-shi, Aichi-ken 470-1195
- Website: Official website

Toyoake (豊明市, Toyoake-shi) is a city located in Aichi Prefecture, Japan. As of 1 October 2019, the city had an estimated population of 69,525 in 30,185 households, and a population density of 2,994 persons per km^{2}. The total area of the city is 23.22 square kilometres (8.97 sq mi).

== Geography ==
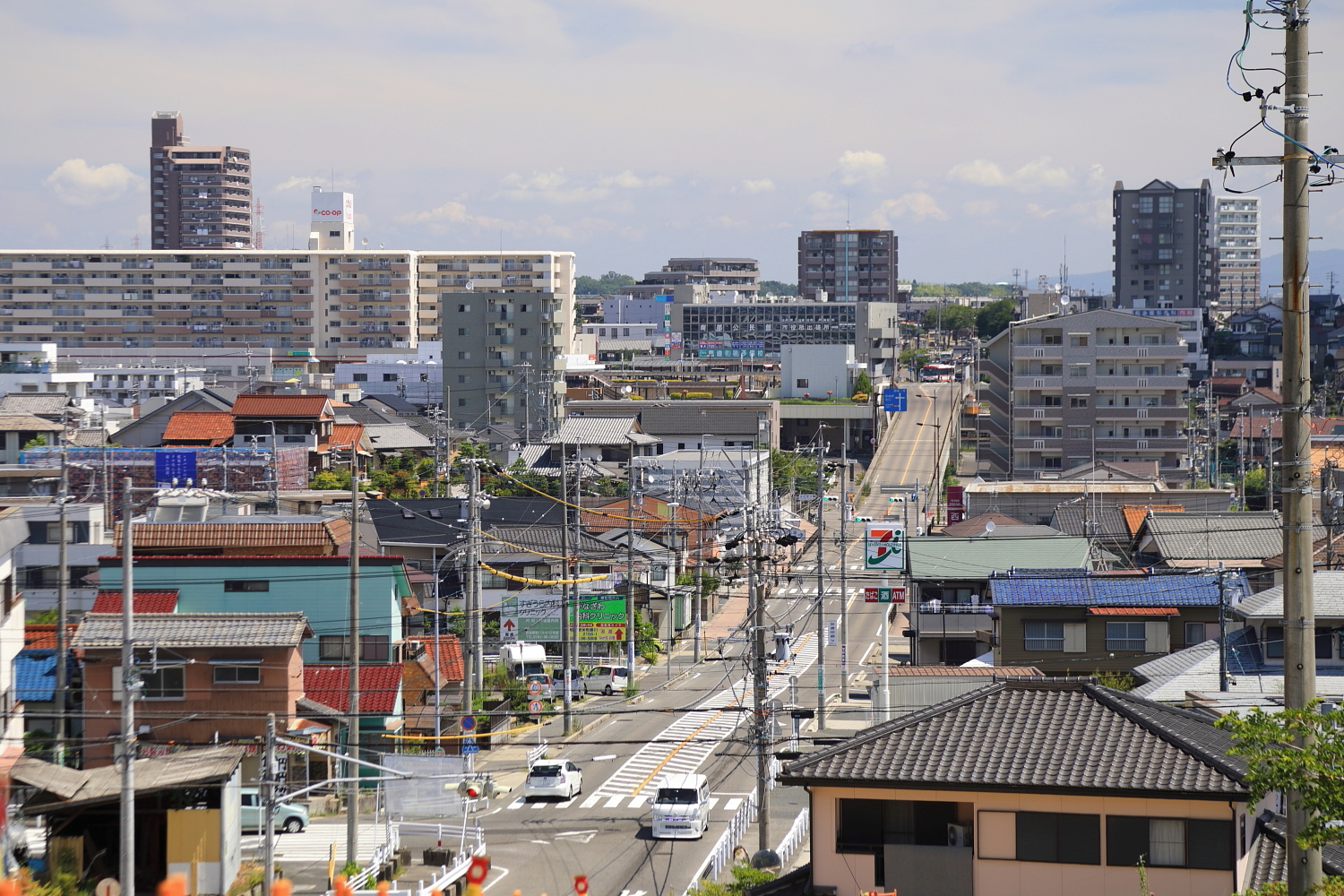
Skyline of Toyoake City

Toyoake is located in the coastal flatlands of central Aichi Prefecture, bordering the Nagoya metropolis.

=== Climate ===
The city has a climate characterized by hot and humid summers, and relatively mild winters (Köppen climate classification Cfa). The average annual temperature in Toyoake is 15.6 °C. The average annual rainfall is 1586 mm with September as the wettest month. The temperatures are highest on average in August, at around 27.9 °C, and lowest in January, at around 4.3 °C.

=== Demographics ===
Per Japanese census data, the population of Toyoake exploded during the 1970s and has continued to grow.

Historical population
Year	Pop.	±%
1920	6,402	—
1930	6,921	+8.1%
1940	7,872	+13.7%
1950	11,646	+47.9%
1960	15,366	+31.9%
1970	29,776	+93.8%
1980	54,667	+83.6%
1990	62,160	+13.7%
2000	66,495	+7.0%
2010	69,727	+4.9%

=== Surrounding municipalities ===
Aichi Prefecture

- Kariya
- Nagoya (Midori-ku)
- Ōbu
- Tōgō

== History ==
=== Feudal period ===
The area of modern Toyoake was part of Owari Province and was the location of many battles during the Sengoku period, one of them being the Battle of Okehazama.

=== Early modern period ===
It was part of the holdings of Owari Domain under the Edo period Tokugawa shogunate.

=== Late modern period ===
With the establishment of the modern municipalities system in 1888, Toyoake Village was created within Aichi District, Aichi.

=== Contemporary history ===
Toyoake became a town on January 1, 1951, and was elevated to city status on August 1, 1982.

== Government ==
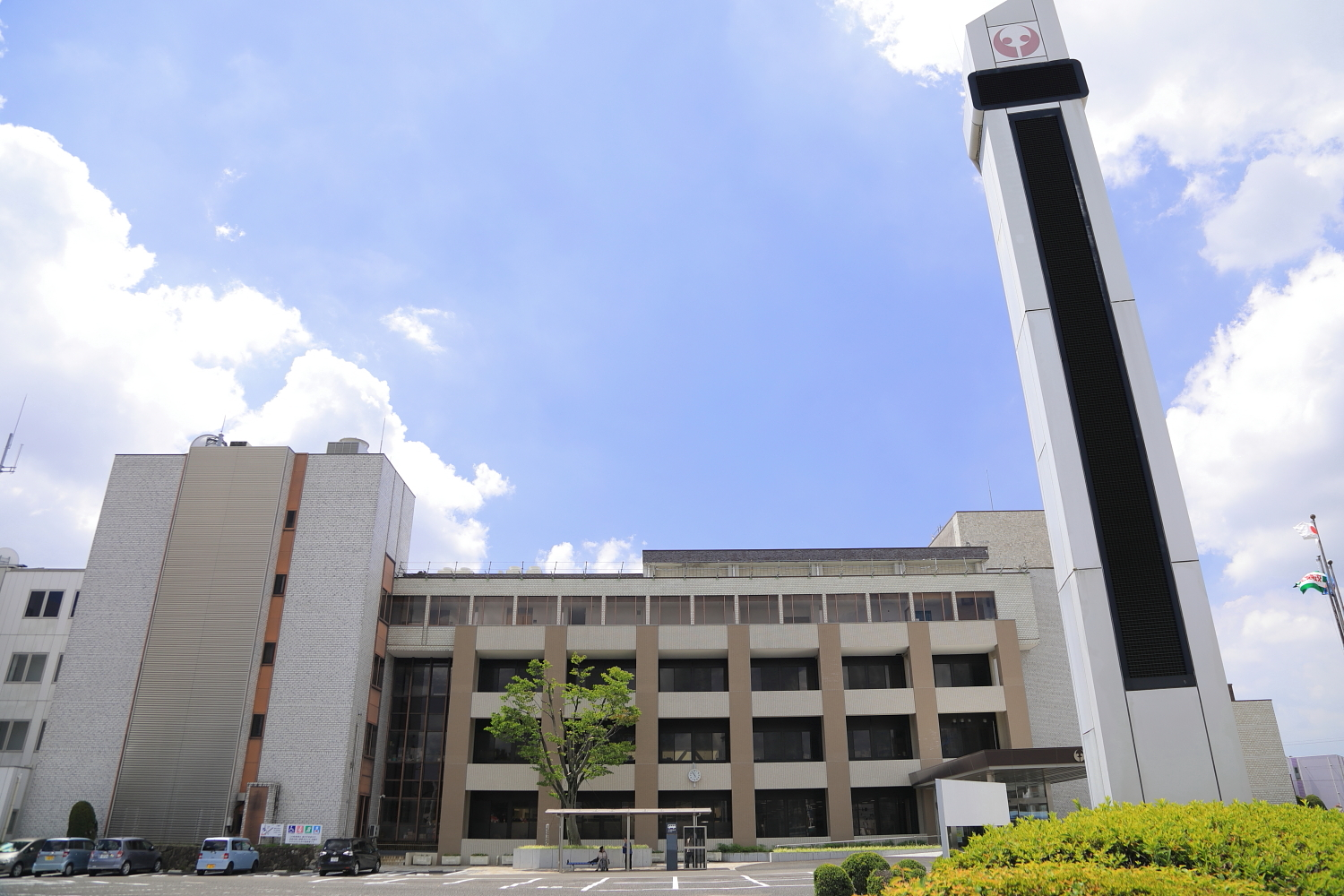
City hall

Toyoake has a mayor-council form of government with a directly elected mayor and a unicameral city legislature of 20 members. The city contributes one member to the Aichi Prefectural Assembly. In terms of national politics, the city is part of Aichi District 7 of the lower house of the Diet of Japan.

== Sister cities ==
=== International ===
Friendship city

- Shepparton, Victoria, Australia, since October 22, 2003

=== National ===
Friendship city

- Toyone, Aichi Prefecture, since November 3, 1977
- Agematsu, Nagano Prefecture, since November 12, 2002

== Economy ==
Due to its proximity to the Nagoya metropolis, Toyoake is largely a bedroom community with some light manufacturing and product distribution.

== Education ==
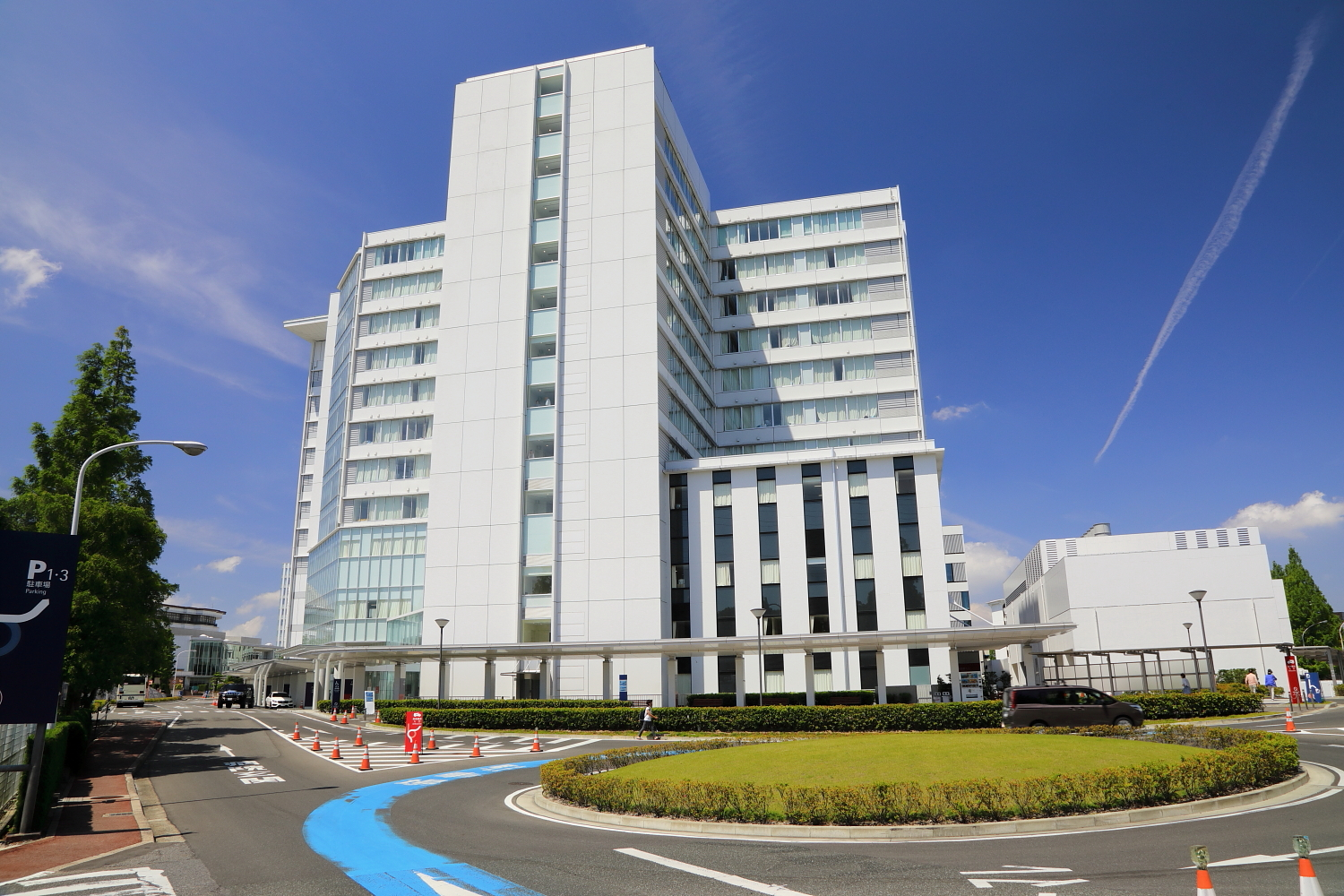
Fujita Health University Hospital

=== Universities ===
- Fujita Health University
- Ohkagakuen University

=== Colleges ===
- Nagoya College

=== Primary and secondary schools ===
Toyoake has nine public elementary schools and three public junior high schools operated by the city government, and one public high schools operated by the Aichi Prefectural Board of Education. There is also one private junior high school and one private high school. The prefecture also operates one special education school for the handicapped.

=== International schools ===
North Korean:

- Aichi Korean Middle and High School

== Transportation ==
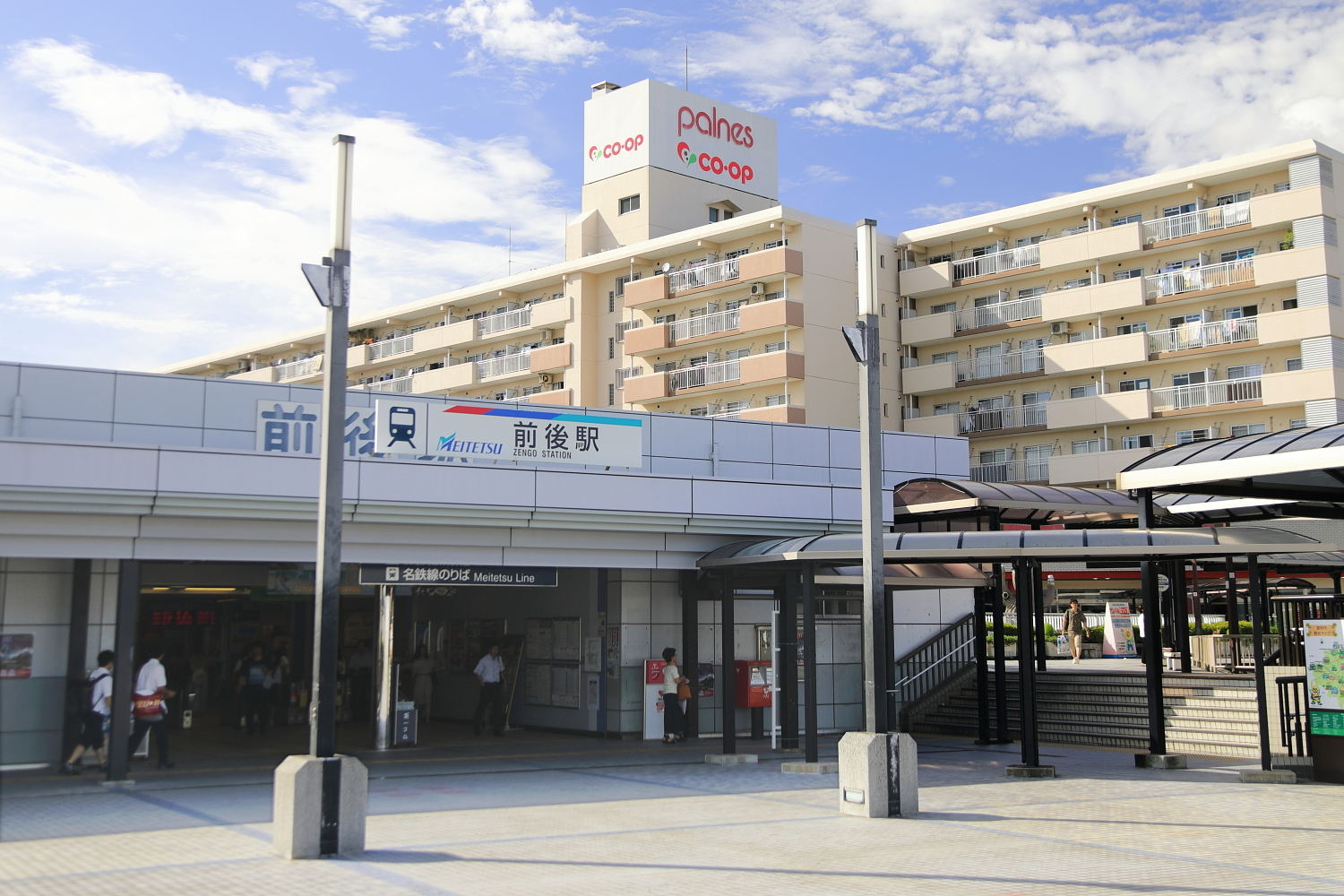
Zengo Station

=== Railways ===
==== Conventional lines ====
Meitetsu

- Nagoya Main Line: - Zengo - Toyoake -

=== Roads ===
==== Expressways ====
- Isewangan Expressway - Toyoake Interchange

==== Japan National Route ====
- National Route 1

== Local attractions ==
=== Places ===
- Ano Ichirizuka, milestone markers on the old Tōkaidō, National Historic Site
- Ruins of Kutsukake Castle (沓掛城址)
- Okehazama Battlefield site, National Historic Site
- Chukyo Racecourse (中京競馬場)

== Culture ==
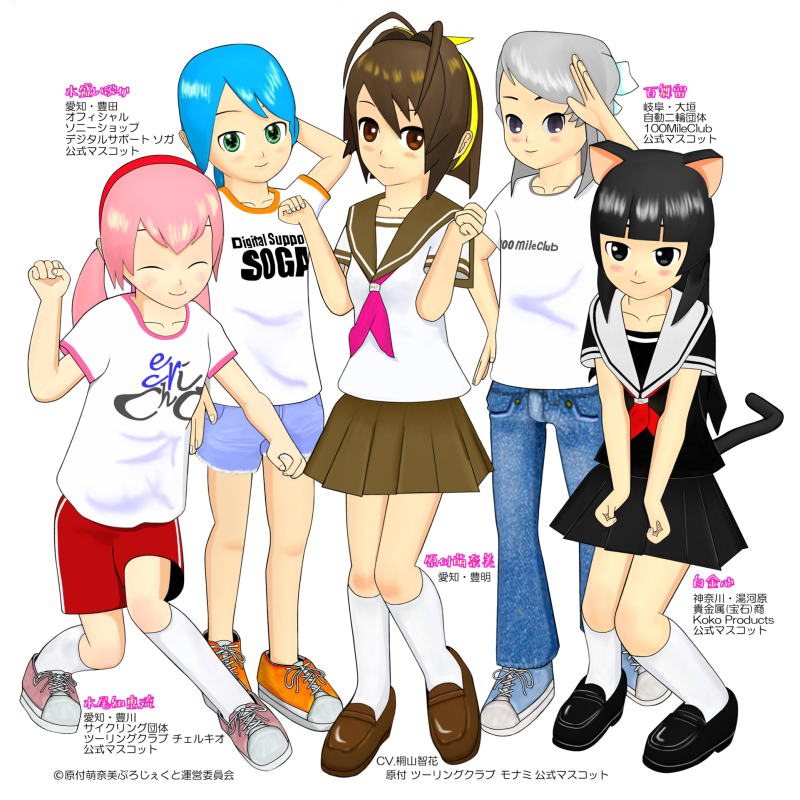
Mascots of Toyoake

=== Mascots ===
- Monami Gentsuki
- Nobunaga-kun and Yoshimoto-kun

=== Events ===
==== April ====
- Toyoake Spring Festival (豊明春まつり, Toyoake Haru-Matsuri)

==== June ====
- Okehazama Old Battlefield Festival (桶狭間古戦場まつり, Okehazama Kosenjo-Matsuri)

==== August ====
- Toyoake Summer Festival (豊明夏まつり, Toyoake Natsu-Matsuri)

==== November ====
- Toyoake Festival (豊明まつり, Toyoake Matsuri)
- Toyoake Marathon (とよあけマラソン, Toyoake Marason)

== Gallery ==
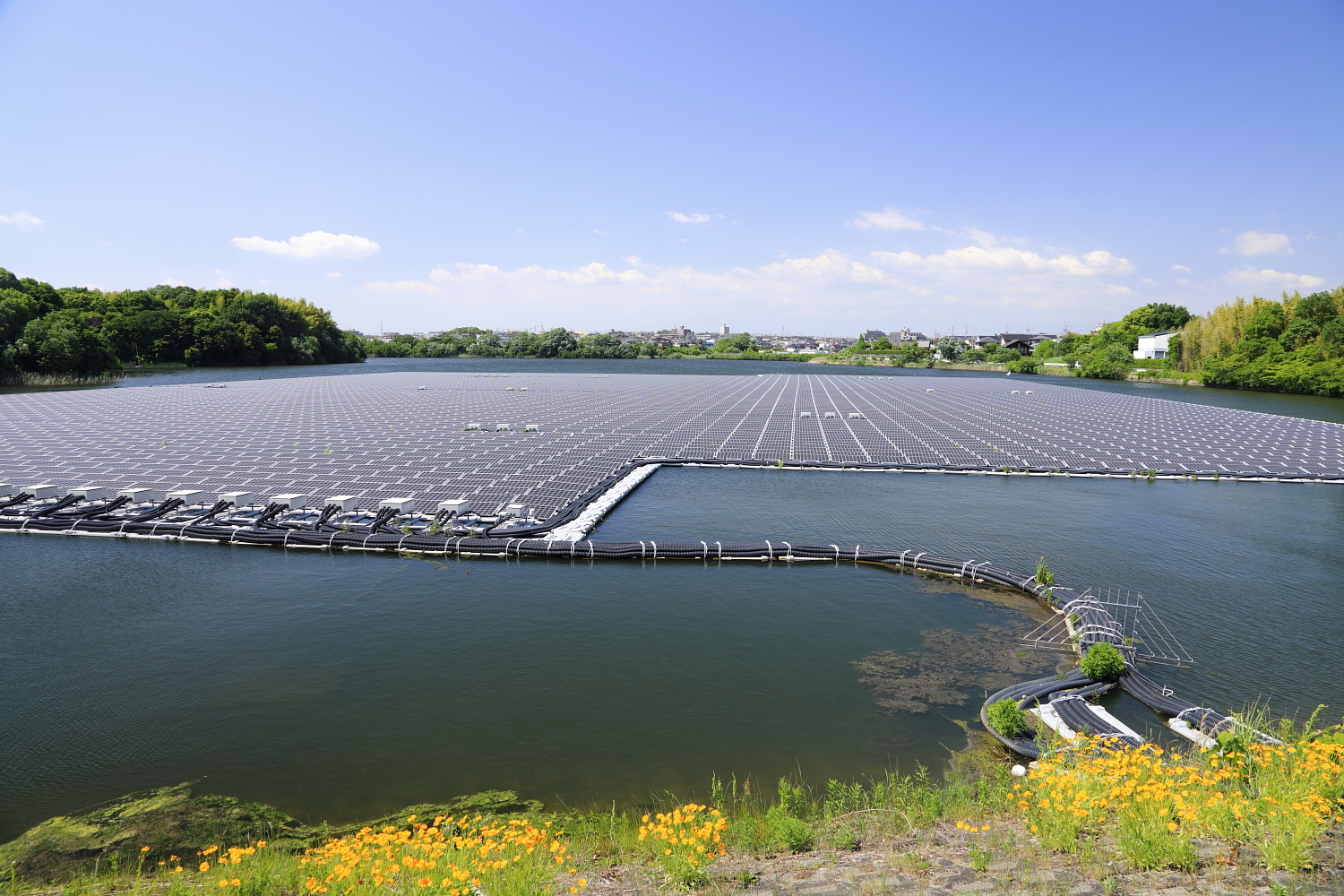
Nyakōji-ike pond

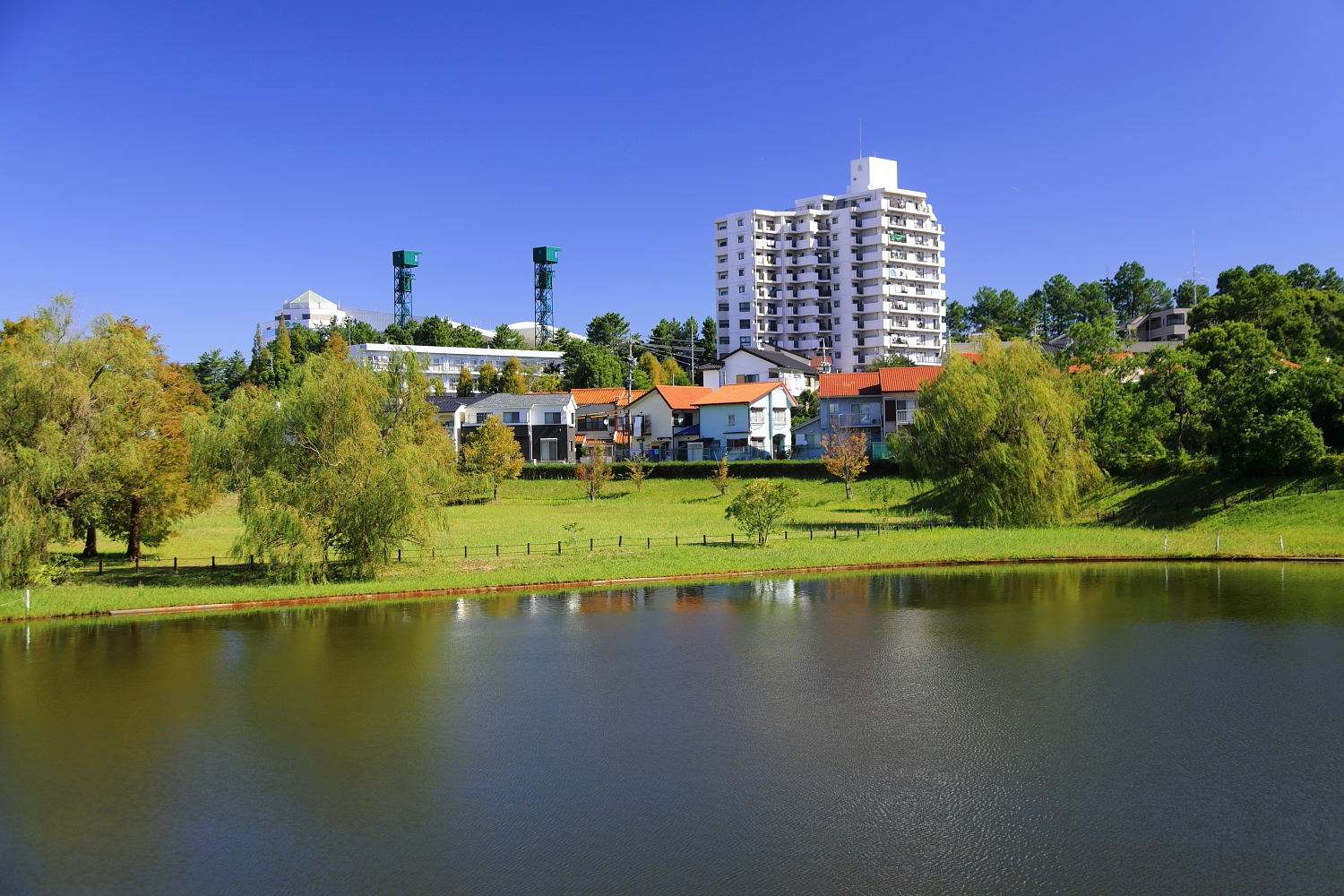
Nishi-ike pond & Nishiike park

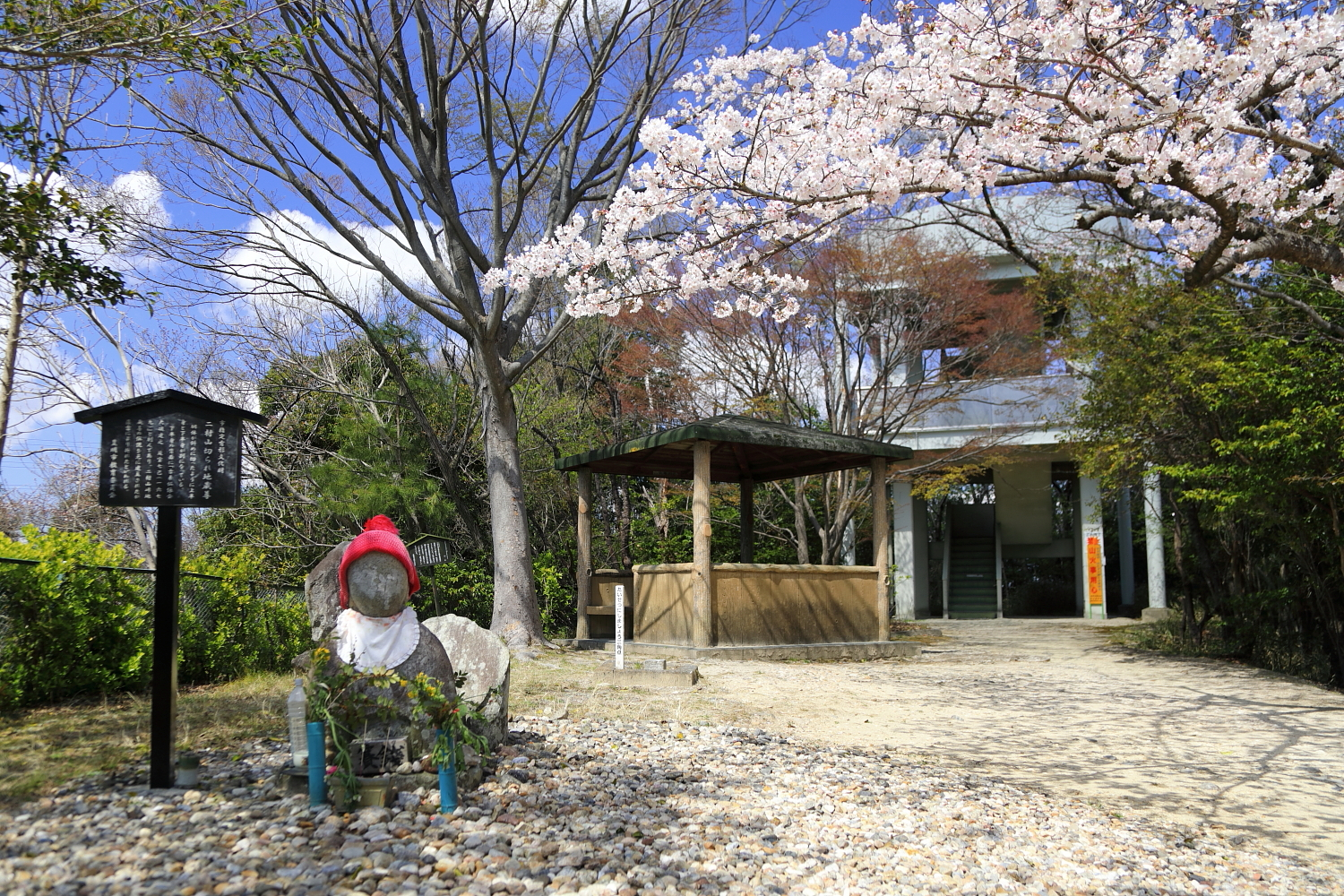
Mount Futamura

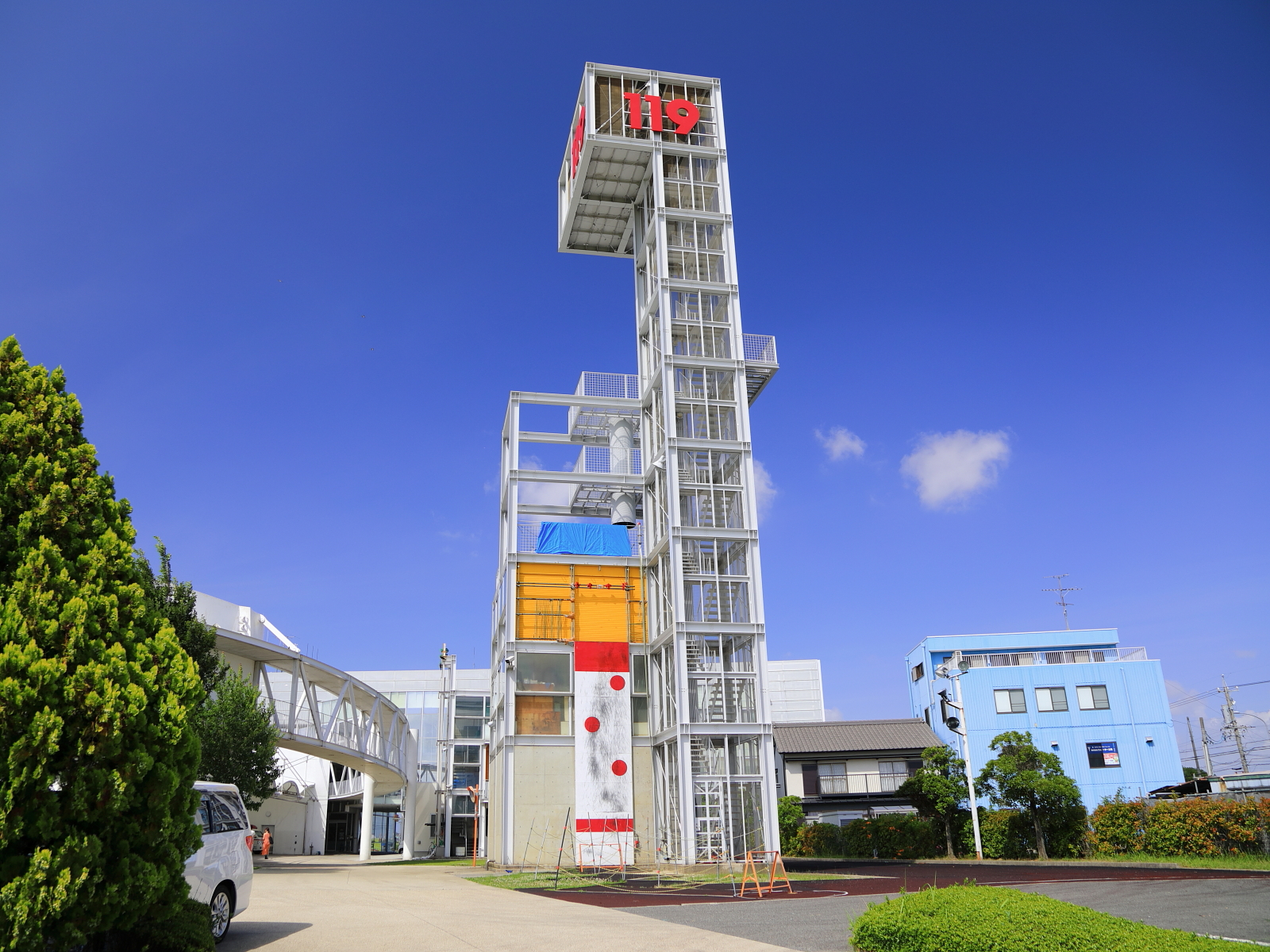
Fire department

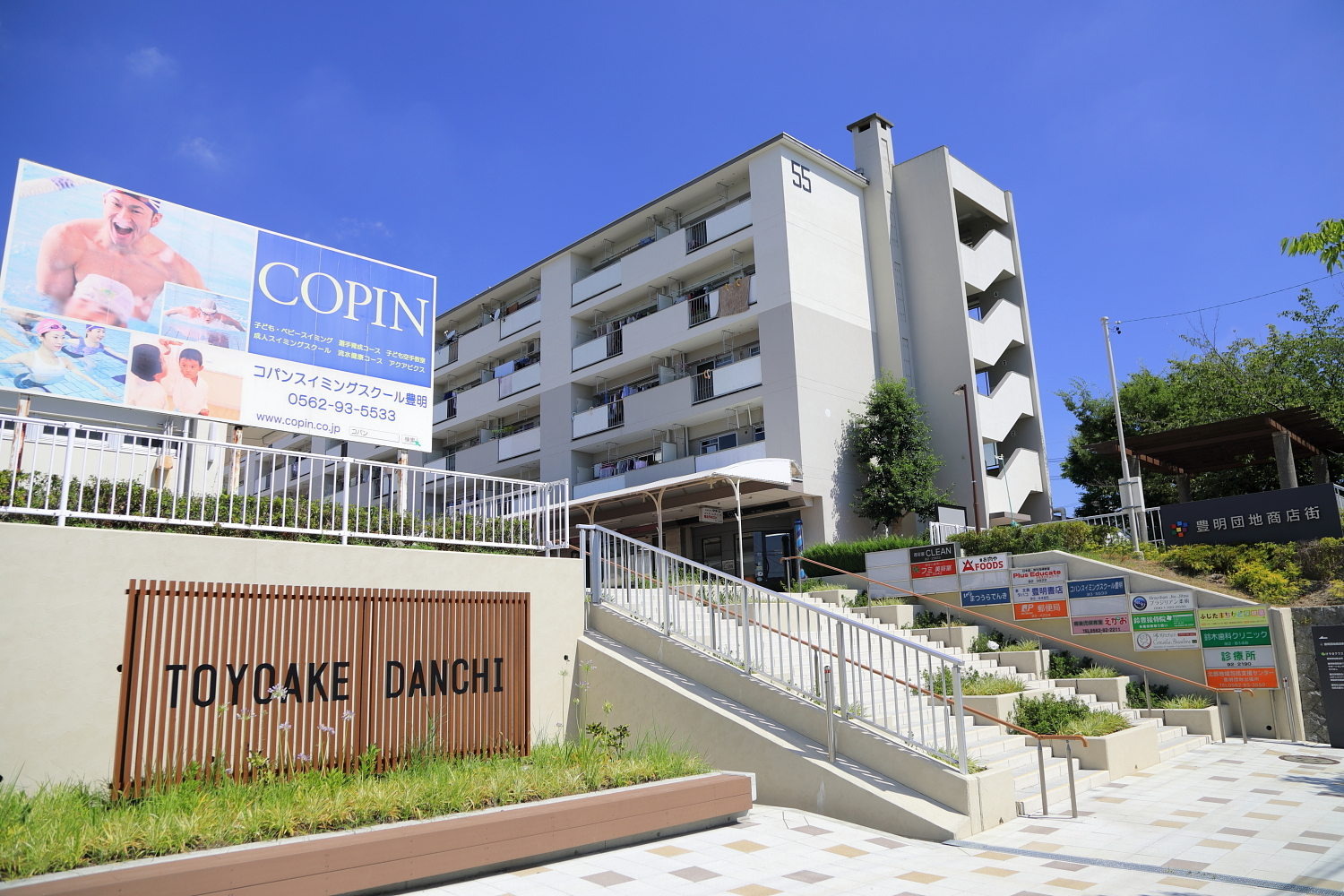
Toyoake Danchi

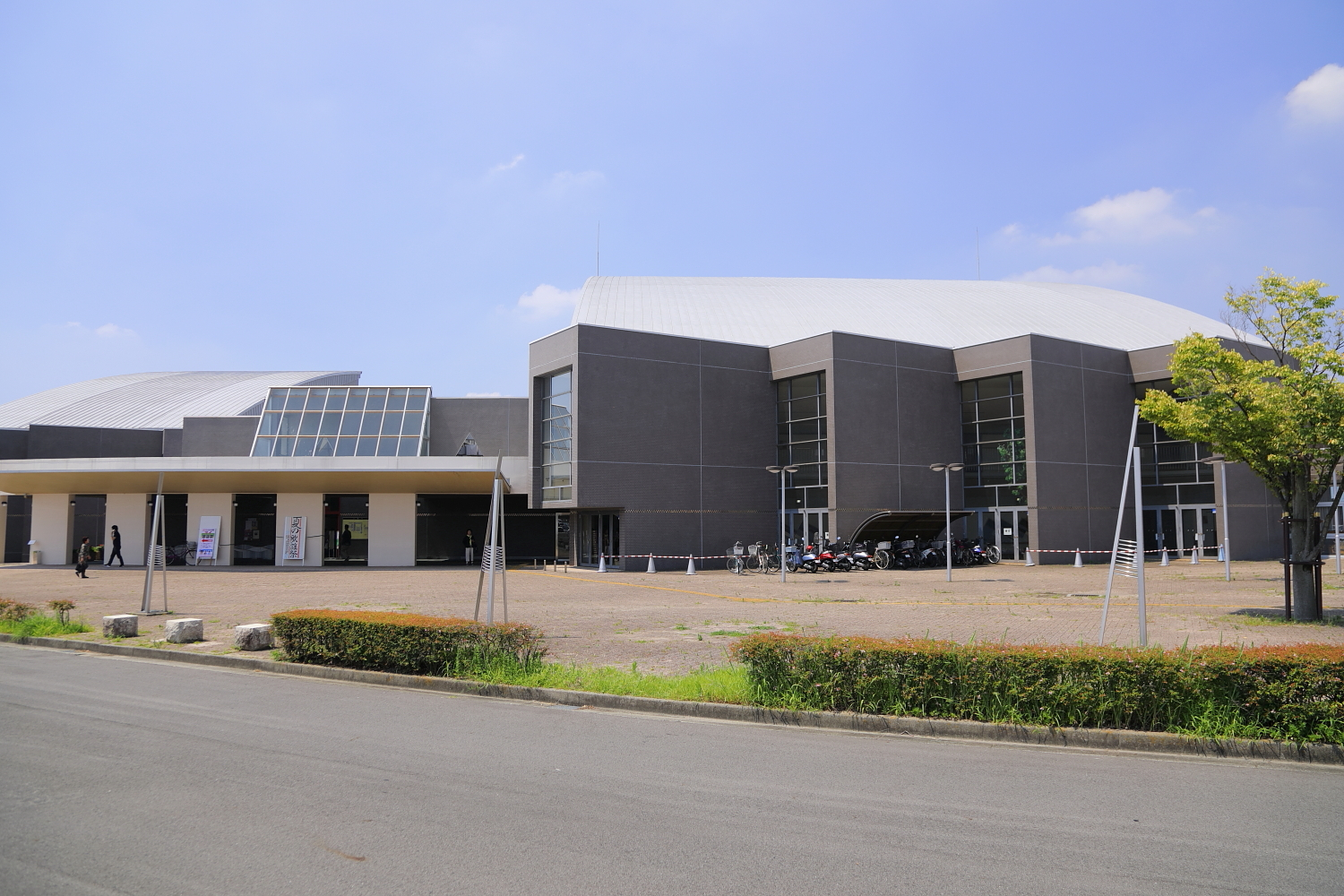
Cultural center

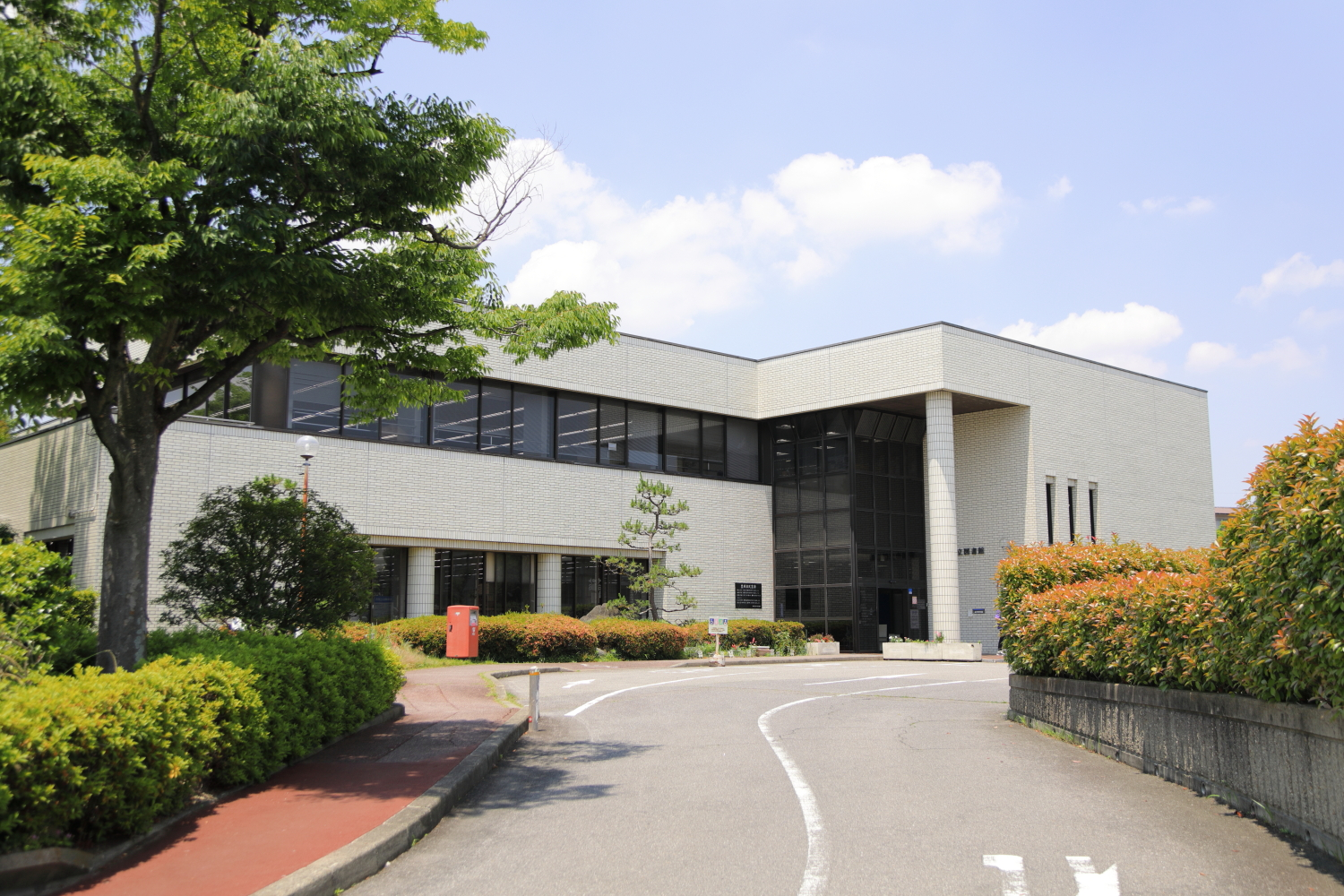
Toyoake city library

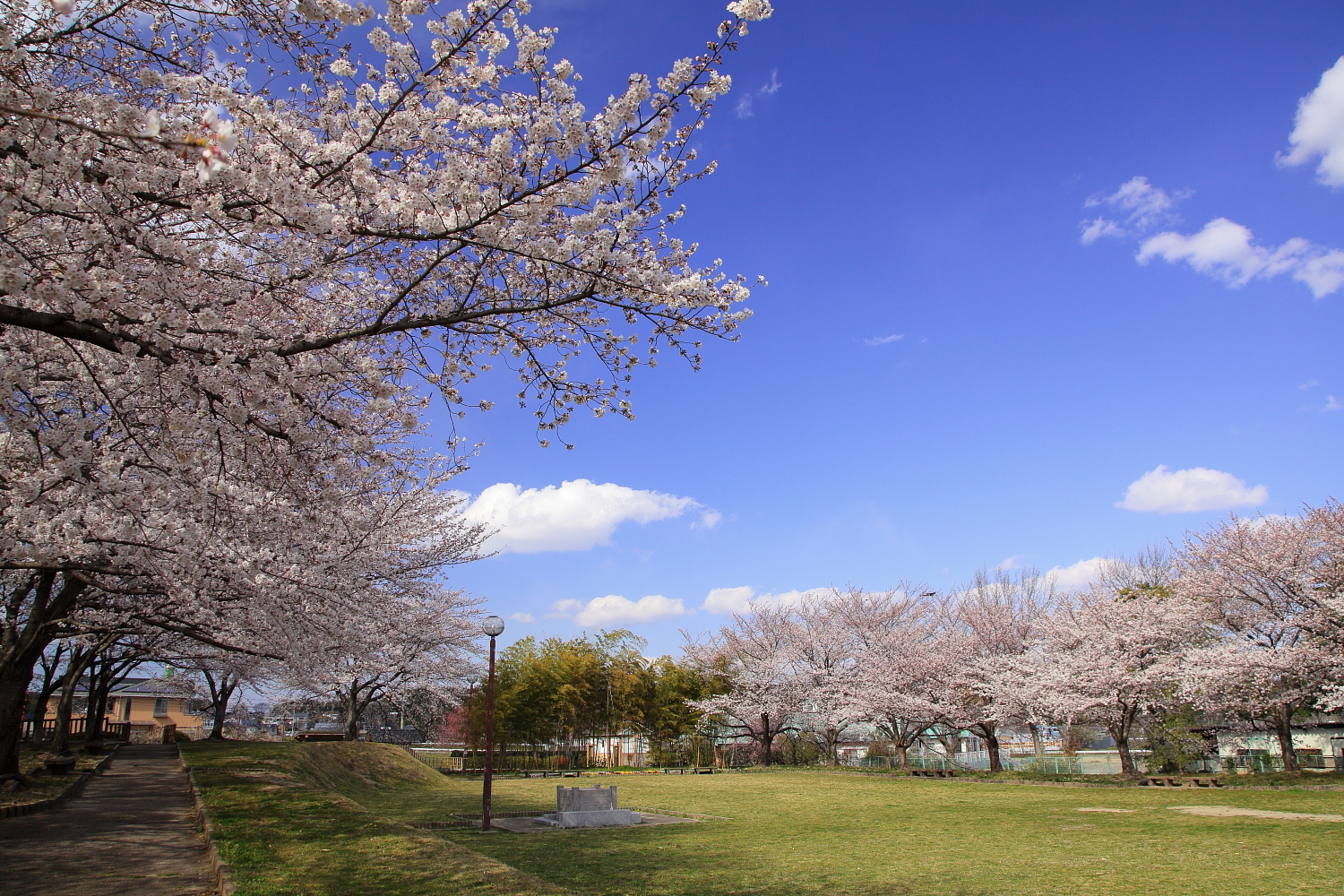
Ruins of Kutsukake castle

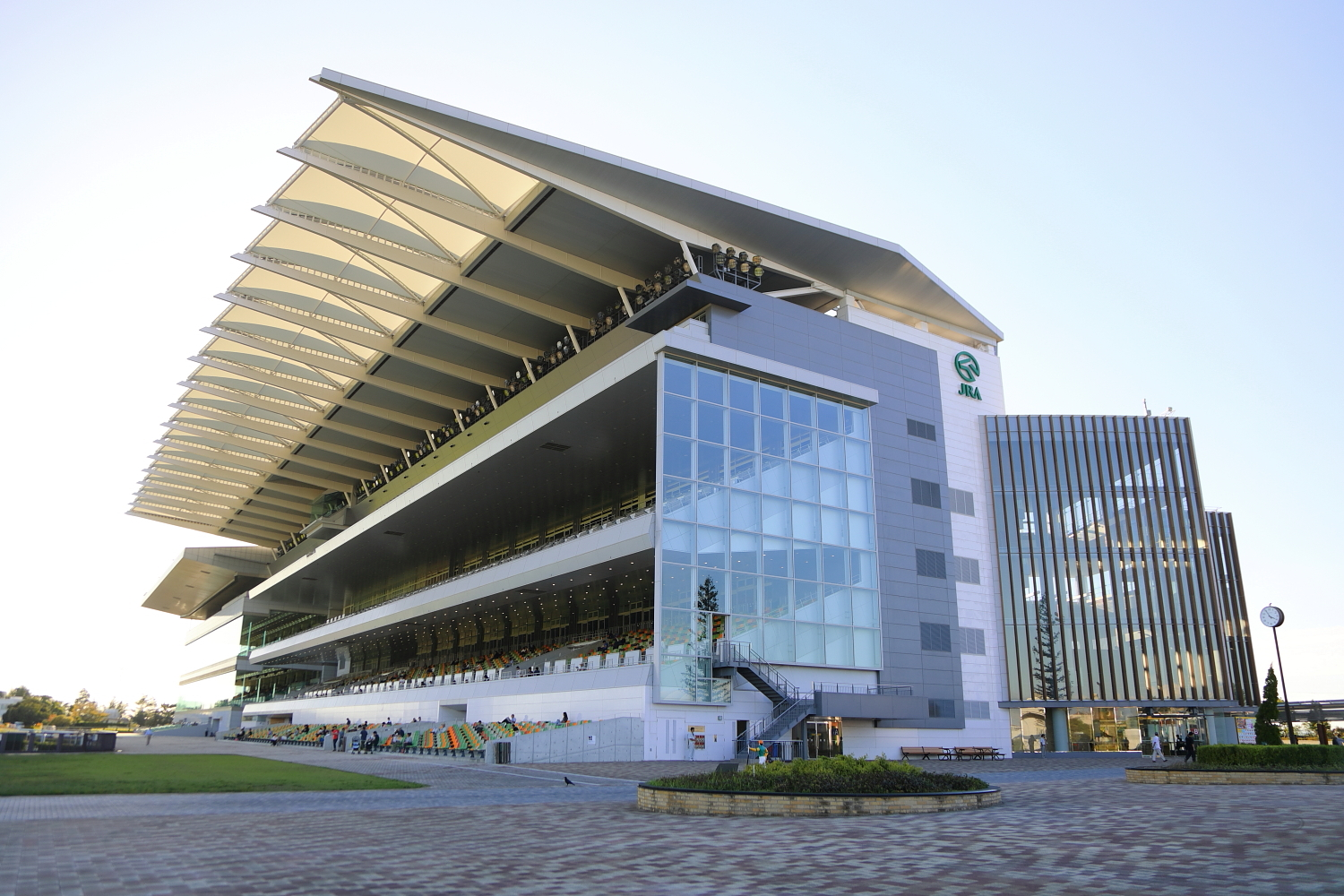
Chukyo Racecourse Main-stand PEGASUS

== Notable people from Toyoake ==
- Kimiyasu Kudoh, professional baseball player
