= Nagoya College =

- 名古屋短期大学
- Type: Private; Junior college Women's college
- Established: 1923
- Location: Toyoake, Aichi, Japan; 35.0600°N 136.9755°E
- Nickname: Meitan
- Website: www.nagoyacollege.ac.jp (in Japanese)

Nagoya College (名古屋短期大学, Nagoya tanki daigaku) is a private women's junior college in the city of Toyoake in Aichi Prefecture, Japan. Although actually in Toyoake, the school is very close to the city of Nagoya. The predecessor of the school, a women's school, was founded in 1923, and it was chartered as a junior college in 1955.
