= Horita Station (Meitetsu) =

Railway station in Nagoya, Japan

Horita Station 堀田駅

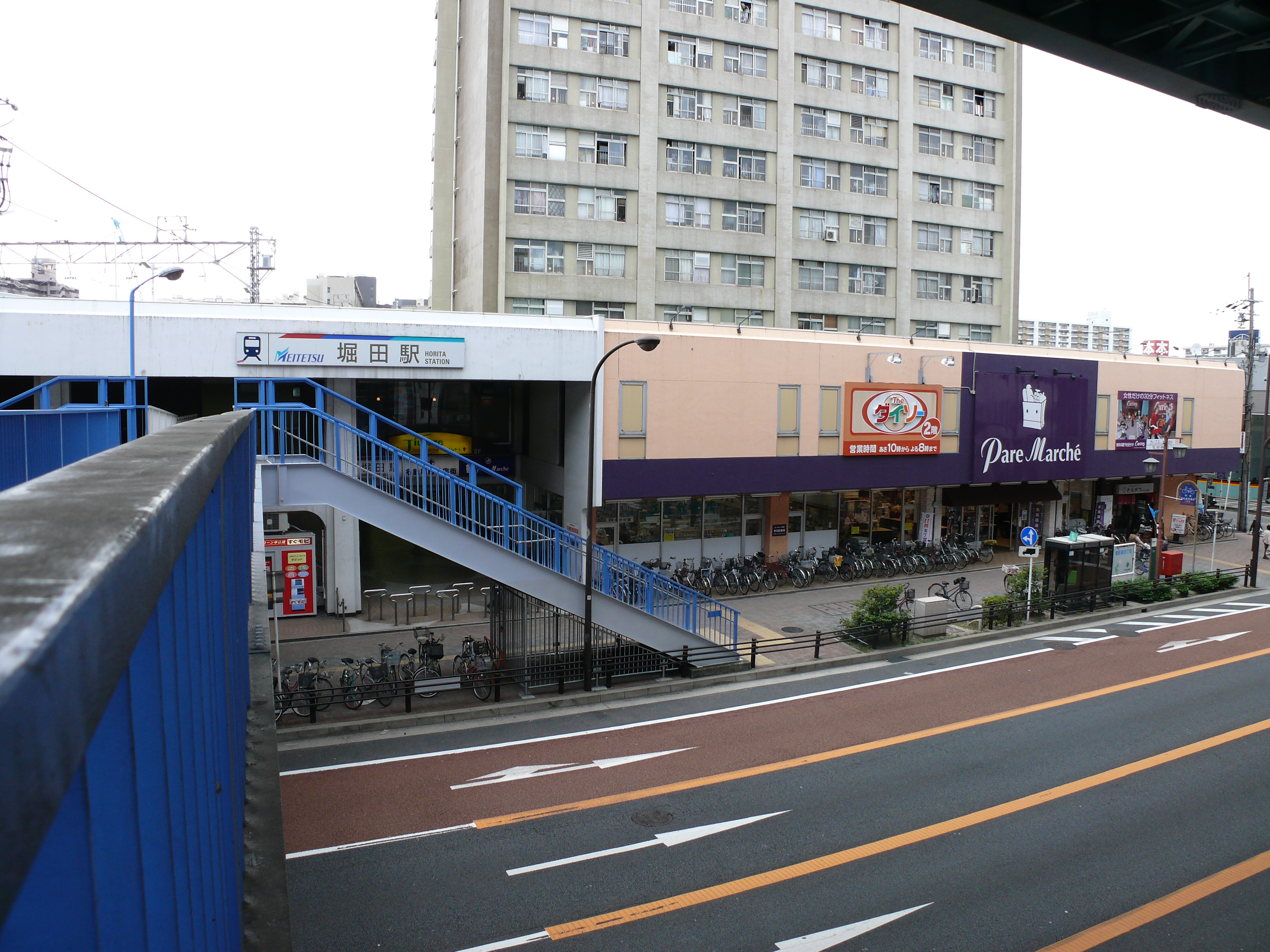
- Horita Station East Entrance in May 2007

General information
- Location: 28-26 Shinkaichō, Mizuho-ku, Nagoya-shi, Aichi-ken 467-0856; Japan
- Coordinates: 35.1203°N 136.92°E
- Operator: Meitetsu
- Line: ■ Meitetsu Nagoya Line
- Distance: 61.1 kilometers from Toyohashi
- Platforms: 2 island platforms

Other information
- Status: Staffed
- Station code: NH32
- Website: Official website

History
- Opened: 15 April 1928; 98 years ago

Passengers
- FY2017: 6974
Location
- Location within Aichi Prefecture Location within Japan

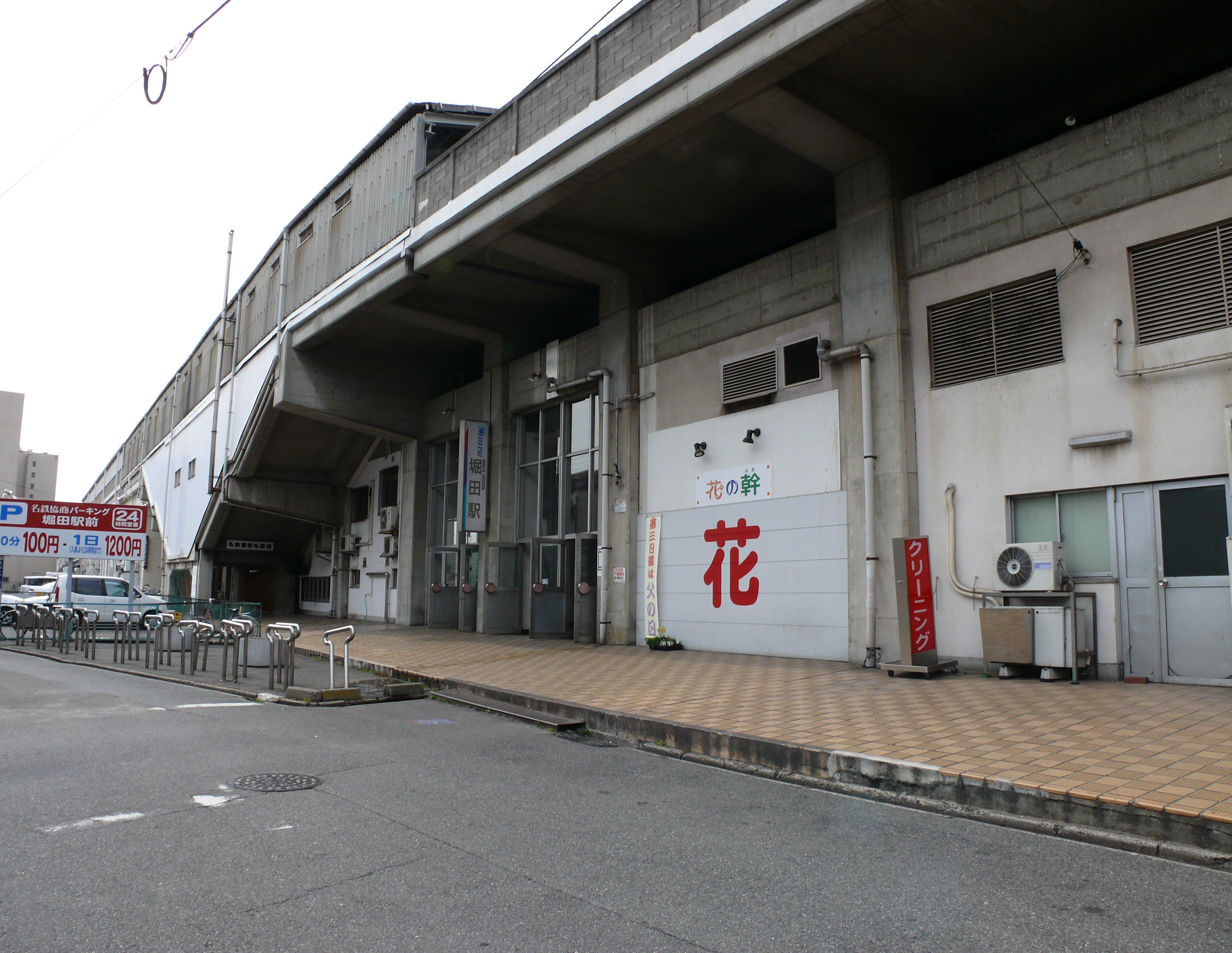
South

Horita Station (堀田駅, Horita-eki) is a railway station in Mizuho-ku, Nagoya, Aichi Prefecture, Japan, operated by Meitetsu.

== Lines ==
Horita Station is served by the Meitetsu Nagoya Main Line and is 61.1 kilometers from the terminus of the line at Toyohashi Station.

== Station layout ==
The station has two elevated island platforms with the station building underneath. Both platforms are on passing loops to allow for the passage of express trains in two tracks in between. The station has automated ticket machines, Manaca automated turnstiles and is staffed.

=== Platforms ===
1, 2	■ Meitetsu Nagoya Main Line	For Kanayama and Meitetsu-Nagoya
3, 4	■ Meitetsu Nagoya Main Line	For Higashi Okazaki and Toyohashi

== Adjacent stations ==
←	Service	→
Meitetsu Nagoya Main Line
Limited Express (特急): Does not stop at this station
Narumi	Express (急行)	Jingū-mae
Narumi	Semi Express (準急)	Jingū-mae
Yobitsugi	Local (普通)	Jingū-mae

== Station history ==
Horita Station was opened on 15 April 1928 as a station on the Aichi Electric Railway. On 1 April 1935, the Aichi Electric Railway merged with the Nagoya Railroad (the forerunner of present-day Meitetsu). Ticket vending machines were installed at this station on 16 August 1965, the first in Japan. The tracks were elevated from 1967 to 1968.

== Passenger statistics ==
In fiscal 2017, the station was used by an average of 6,974 passengers daily.

== Surrounding area ==
- Horita Station (Nagoya Municipal Subway)
- Japan National Route 1

== See also ==
- List of railway stations in Japan
