= Zengo Station =

Railway station in Toyoake, Aichi Prefecture, Japan

Zengo Station 前後駅

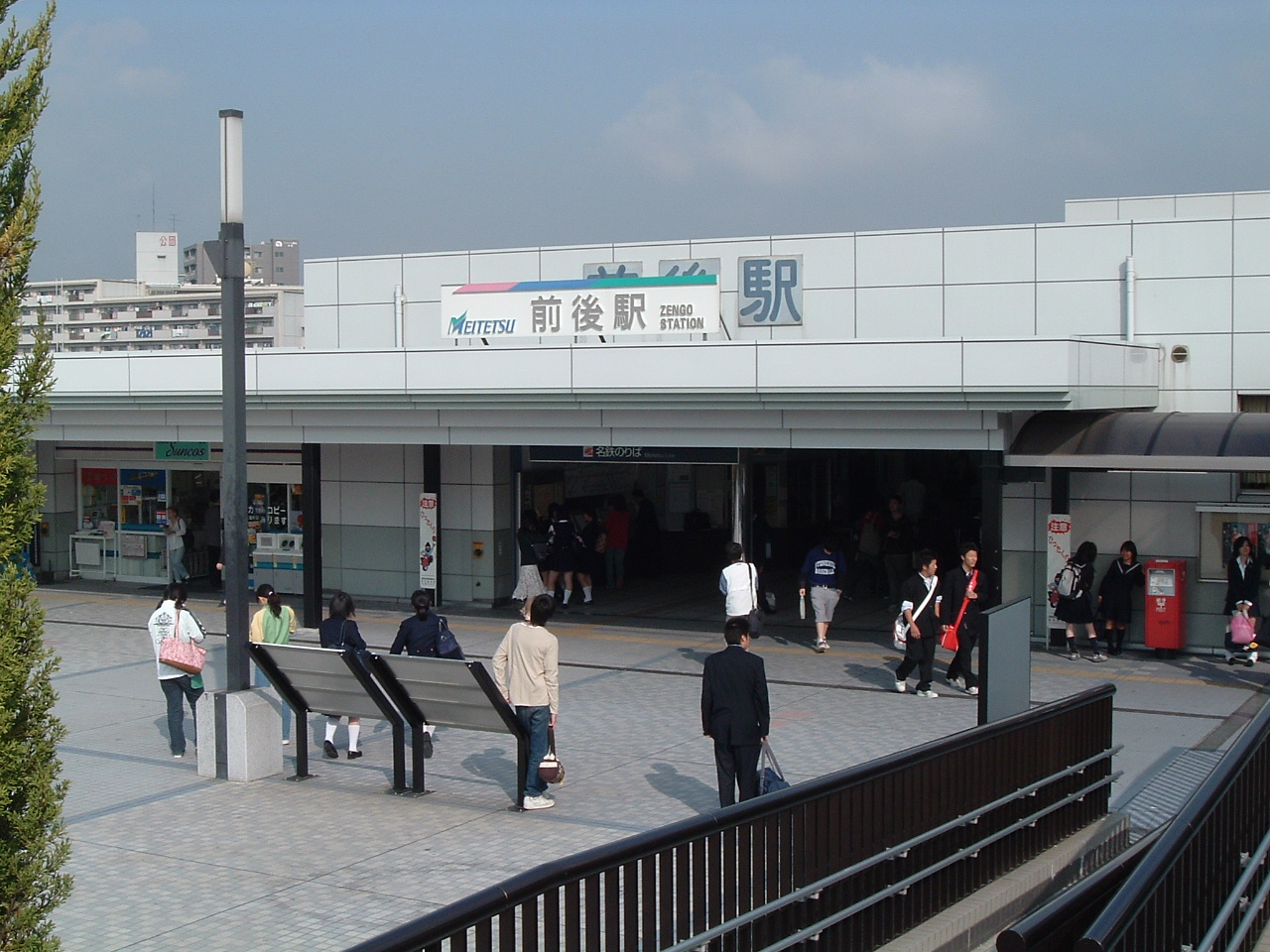
- Zengo Station exit

General information
- Location: Zene-1634-2 Zengochō, Toyoake-shi, Aichi-ken 470-1151; Japan
- Coordinates: 35°3′7.55″N 136°59′44.47″E
- Operator: Meitetsu
- Line: ■ Meitetsu Nagoya Line
- Distance: 49.8 kilometers from Toyohashi
- Platforms: 2 island platforms

Other information
- Status: Staffed
- Station code: NH23
- Website: Official website

History
- Opened: 1 April 1923; 103 years ago

Passengers
- FY2015: 20,033
Location
- Location within Aichi Prefecture Location within Japan

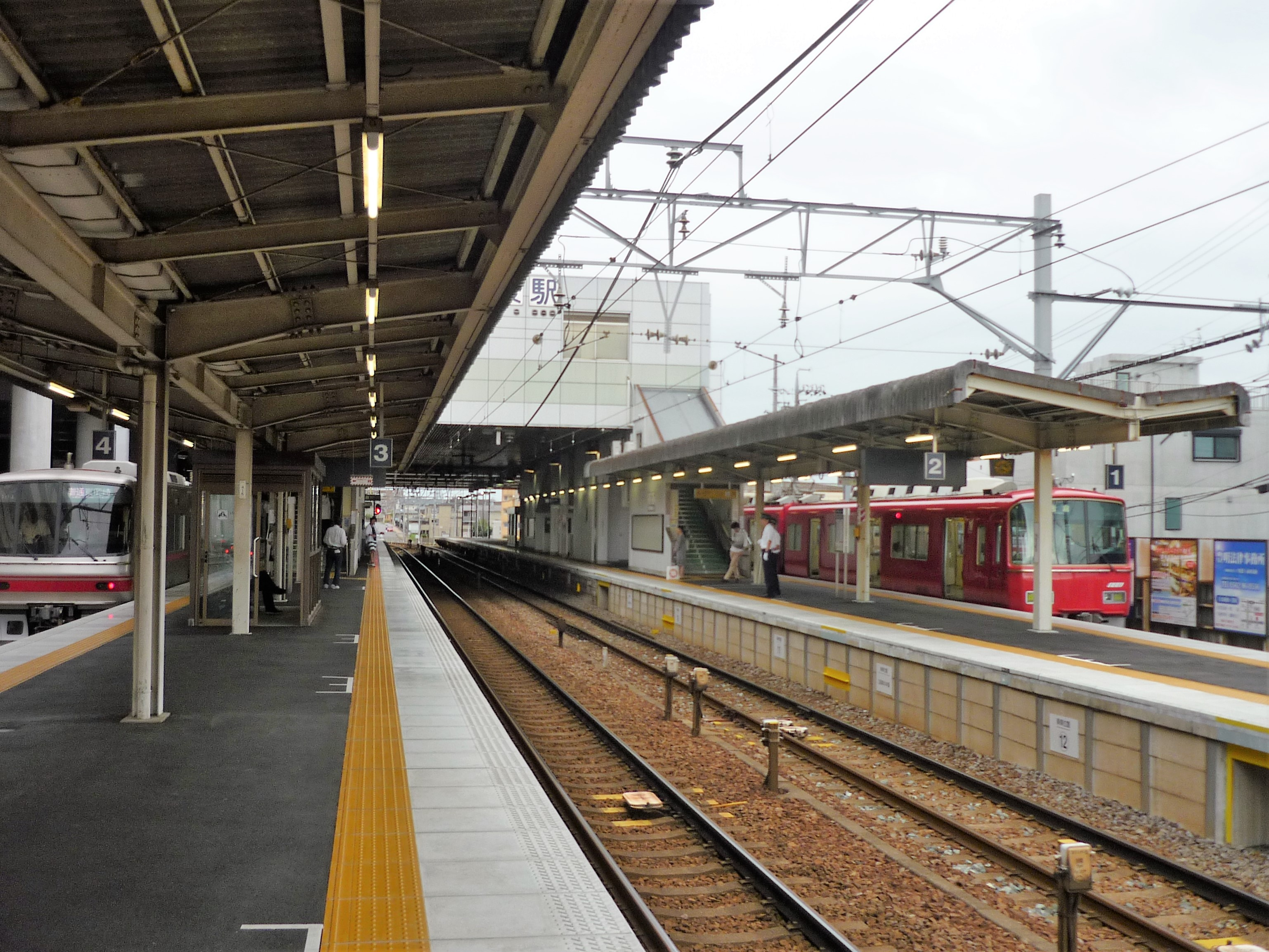
Platforms

Track layout

Zengo Station (前後駅, Zengo-eki) is a railway station in the city of Toyoake, Aichi Prefecture, Japan, operated by Meitetsu. Local, Express and Semi Express trains has stops at Zengo station.

== Lines ==
Zengo Station is served by the Meitetsu Nagoya Main Line and is 49.8 kilometers from the terminus of the line at Toyohashi Station.

== Station layout ==
The station has two elevated island platforms connected by a footbridge with the station building underneath. The station has automated ticket machines, Manaca automated turnstiles and is staffed.

=== Platforms ===
1	■ Meitetsu Nagoya Main Line	For Meitetsu Nagoya, Meitetsu Gifu and Inuyama
2	■ Meitetsu Nagoya Main Line	For Meitetsu Nagoya, Meitetsu Gifu and Inuyama
3	■ Meitetsu Nagoya Main Line	For Higashi Okazaki and Toyohashi
4	■ Meitetsu Nagoya Main Line	For Higashi Okazaki and Toyohashi

== Adjacent stations ==
←	Service	→
Meitetsu Nagoya Main Line
Chiryū	Express (急行)	Narumi
Toyoake	Semi Express (準急)	Chūkyō-keibajō-mae
Toyoake	Local (普通)	Chūkyō-keibajō-mae

== Station history ==
Zengo Station was opened on 1 April 1923 as a station on the Aichi Electric Railway. On 1 April 1935, the Aichi Electric Railway merged with the Nagoya Railroad (the forerunner of present-day Meitetsu).

== Passenger statistics ==
In fiscal 2015, the station was used by an average of 20,033 passengers daily. .

== Surrounding area ==
- Japan National Route 1

== See also ==
- List of railway stations in Japan
