= Sakabe Station =

Railway station in Agui, Aichi Prefecture, Japan

Sakabe Station 坂部駅

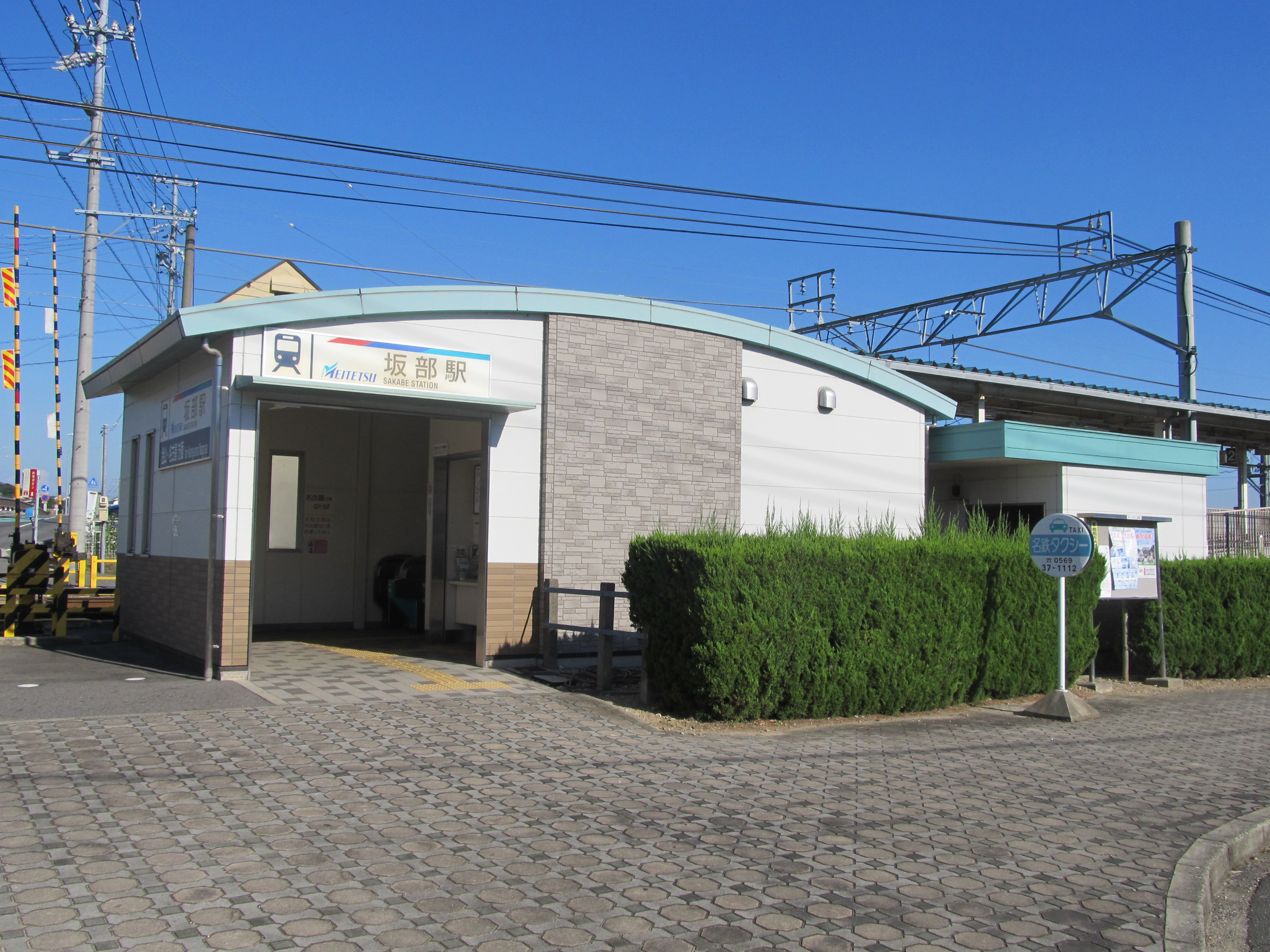
- Sakabe Station in September 2014

General information
- Location: Sakabe Usaka, Agui-machi, Chita-gun, Aichi-ken 470-2212; Japan
- Coordinates: 34.9418°N 136.9164°E
- Operator: Meitetsu
- Line: ■ Meitetsu Kōwa Line
- Distance: 9.5 kilometers from Ōtagawa
- Platforms: 2 side platforms

Other information
- Status: Unstaffed
- Station code: KC07
- Website: Official website

History
- Opened: April 1, 1931

Passengers
- FY2017: 316 daily
Location
- Location within Aichi Prefecture Location within Japan

Sakabe Station (坂部駅, Sakabe-eki) is a railway station in the town of Agui, Chita District, Aichi Prefecture, Japan, operated by Meitetsu.

== Lines ==
Sakabe Station is served by the Meitetsu Kōwa Line, and is located 9.5 kilometers from the starting point of the line at Ōtagawa.

== Station layout ==
The station has two opposed side platforms connected by a level crossing. The platforms are short, and can handle trains of only six carriages or less. The station is unattended.

=== Platforms ===
1	■ Meitetsu Kōwa Line	For Chita Handa, Kōwa, and Utsumi
2	■ Meitetsu Kōwa Line	For Ōtagawa and Kanayama

== Adjacent stations ==
←	Service	→
Meitetsu Kōwa Line
Limited Express: Does not stop at this station
Rapid Express: Does not stop at this station
Express: Does not stop at this station
Semi Express: Does not stop at this station
Shirasawa	Local	Agui

== Station history ==
Sakabe Station was opened on April 1, 1931 as a station on the Chita Railway. The Chita Railway became part of the Meitetsu group on February 2, 1943. In February 2007, the Tranpass system of magnetic fare cards with automatic turnstiles was implemented, after which time the station has been unattended.

== Passenger statistics ==
In fiscal 2017, the station was used by an average of 316 passengers daily (boarding passengers only).

== Surrounding area ==
- Agui Ebi Elementary School

== See also ==
- List of railway stations in Japan
