= Tatsumigaoka Station =

Railway station in Chita, Aichi Prefecture, Japan

Tatsumigaoka Station 巽ケ丘駅

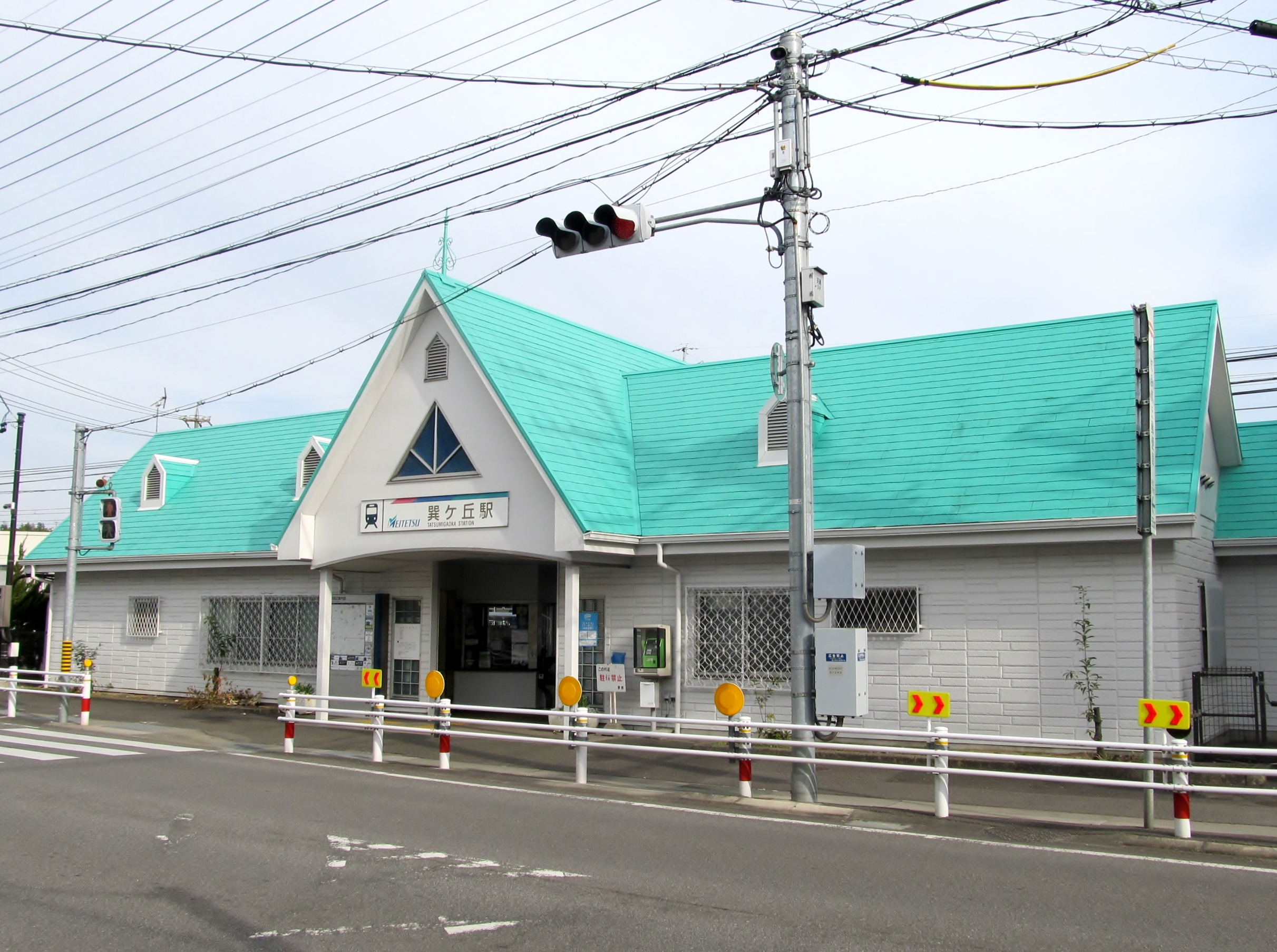
- Tatsumigaoka Station in January 2022

General information
- Location: Tatsumigaoka 3-134, Chita-shi, Aichi-ken 478-0012; Japan
- Coordinates: 34.9622°N 136.9154°E
- Operator: Meitetsu
- Line: Kōwa Line
- Distance: 7.1 kilometers from Ōtagawa
- Platforms: 2 side platforms

Other information
- Status: Unstaffed
- Station code: KC05
- Website: Official website

History
- Opened: July 10, 1955

Passengers
- FY2017: 6463 daily

Services
Preceding station	Meitetsu	Following station
Agui towards Kōwa	Kōwa Line Limited Express (some services)	Minami Kagiya towards Ōtagawa
Agui towards Kōwa	Kōwa Line Rapid Express Express Semi-Express	Minami Kagiya towards Ōtagawa
Shirasawa towards Kōwa	Kōwa Line Local	Yawata-shinden towards Ōtagawa
Location
- Location within Aichi Prefecture Location within Japan

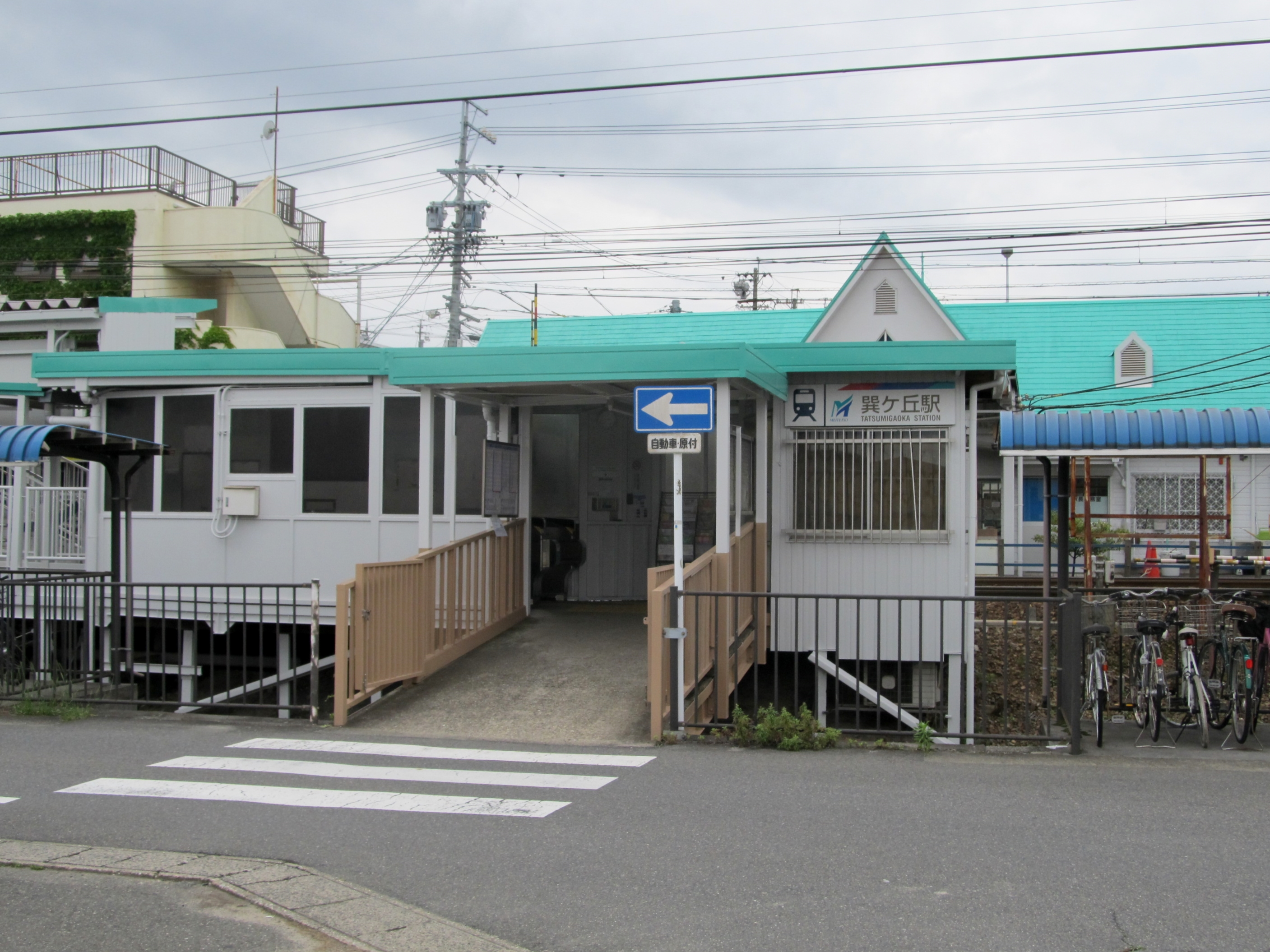
East Exit

Tatsumigaoka Station (巽ケ丘駅, Tatsumigaoka-eki) is a railway station in the city of Chita, Aichi, Japan, operated by Meitetsu.

== Lines ==
Tatsumigaoka Station is served by the Meitetsu Kōwa Line, and is located 7.1 kilometers from the starting point of the line at Ōtagawa.

== Station layout ==
The station has two opposed side platforms connected by a level crossing. The station is unattended.

=== Platforms ===
1	■ Meitetsu Kōwa Line	For Chita Handa, Kōwa, and Utsumi
2	■ Meitetsu Kōwa Line	For Ōtagawa and Kanayama

== Station history ==
Tatsumigaoka Station was opened on July 10, 1955. In July 2006, the Tranpass system of magnetic fare cards with automatic turnstiles were implemented.

== Passenger statistics ==
In fiscal 2017, the station was used by an average of 6,463 passengers daily (boarding passengers only).

== Surrounding area ==
- Shinden Elementary School

== See also ==
- List of railway stations in Japan
