= Takayokosuka Station =

Railway station in Tōkai, Aichi Prefecture, Japan

Takayokosuka Station 高横須賀駅

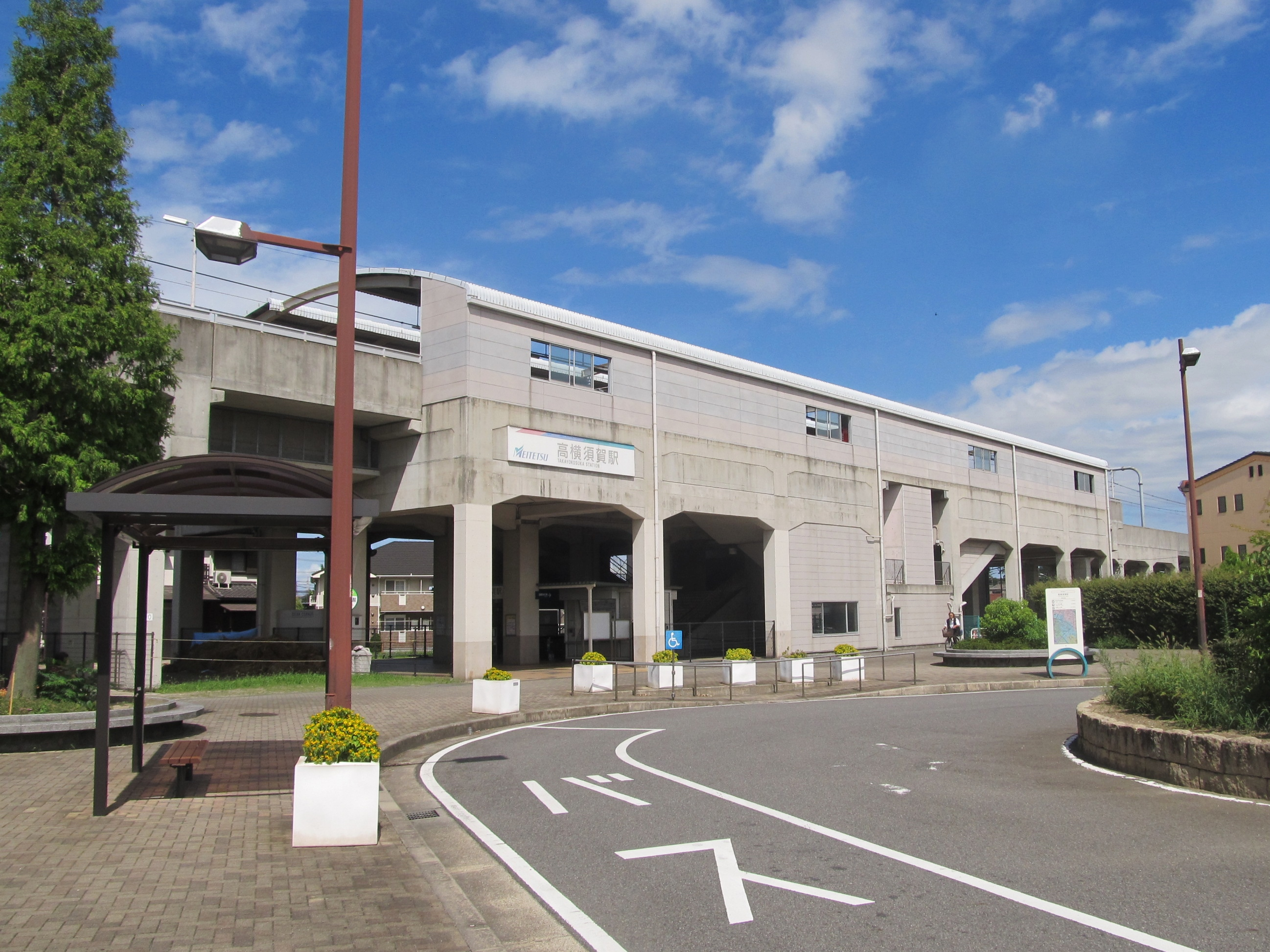
- Takayokosuka Station, August 2017

General information
- Location: Matsumoto-1 Takayokosukamachi, Tokai-shi, Aichi-ken 477-0037; Japan
- Coordinates: 35.0096°N 136.8939°E
- Operator: Meitetsu
- Line: Kōwa Line
- Distance: 1.3 kilometers from Ōtagawa
- Platforms: 2 side platforms

Other information
- Status: Unstaffed
- Station code: KC01
- Website: Official website

History
- Opened: April 1, 1931

Passengers
- FY2017: 3086 daily

Services
Preceding station	Meitetsu	Following station
Kagiya-nakanoike towards Kōwa	Kōwa Line Local	Ōtagawa Terminus
Location
- Location within Aichi Prefecture Location within Japan

Takayokosuka Station (高横須賀駅, Takayokosuka-eki) is a railway station in the city of Tōkai, Aichi Prefecture, Japan, operated by Meitetsu.

== Lines ==
Takayokosuka Station is served by the Meitetsu Kōwa Line, and is located 1.3 kilometers from the starting point of the line at Ōtagawa.

== Station layout ==
The station has two opposed elevated side platforms with the station building underneath. The station has automated ticket machines, Manaca automated turnstiles and is unattended.

=== Platforms ===
1	■ Meitetsu Kōwa Line	For Chita Handa, Kōwa, and Utsumi
2	■ Meitetsu Kōwa Line	For Ōtagawa and Kanayama

== Station history ==
Takayokosuka Station was opened on April 1, 1932 as a station on the Chita Railway. The Chita Railway became part of the Meitetsu group on February 2, 1943. The station has been unattended since 1949. In July 2006, the Tranpass system of magnetic fare cards with automatic turnstiles was implemented.

== Passenger statistics ==
In fiscal 2017, the station was used by an average of 3086 passengers daily.

== Surrounding area ==
- Yokosuka High School

== See also ==
- List of railway stations in Japan
