= Minami Kagiya Station =

Railway station in Tōkai, Aichi Prefecture, Japan

Minami Kagiya Station 南加木屋駅

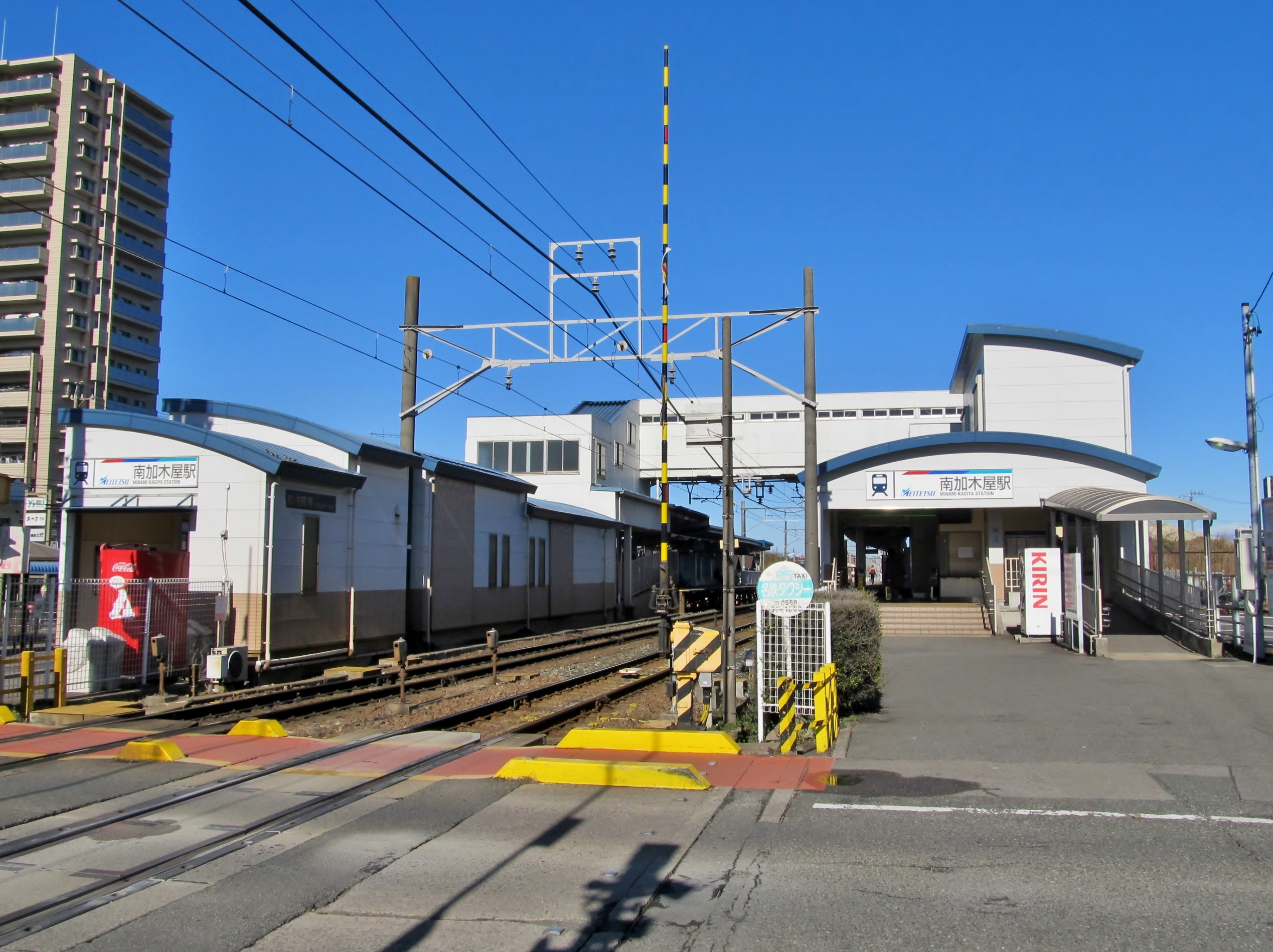
- Minami Kagiya Station in January 2024

General information
- Location: Minamihirai-15 Kagiyamachi, Tokai-shi, Aichi-ken 477-0032; Japan
- Coordinates: 34.9892°N 136.9069°E
- Operator: Meitetsu
- Line: Kōwa Line
- Distance: 4.1 kilometers from Ōtagawa
- Platforms: 2 side platforms

Other information
- Status: Staffed
- Station code: KC03
- Website: Official website

History
- Opened: April 1, 1932

Passengers
- FY2017: 8244 daily

Services
Preceding station	Meitetsu	Following station
Tatsumigaoka towards Kōwa	Kōwa Line Limited Express (some services)	Ōtagawa Terminus
Tatsumigaoka towards Kōwa	Kōwa Line Rapid Express Express Semi-Express	Ōtagawa Terminus
Yawata-shinden towards Kōwa	Kōwa Line Local	Kagiya-nakanoike towards Ōtagawa
Location
- Location within Aichi Prefecture Location within Japan

Minami Kagiya Station (南加木屋駅, Minami Kagiya-eki) is a railway station in the city of Tōkai, Aichi Prefecture, Japan, operated by Meitetsu.

== Lines ==
Minami Kagiya Station is served by the Meitetsu Kōwa Line, and is located 4.1 kilometers from the starting point of the line at Ōtagawa.

== Station layout ==
The station has two opposed side platforms connected by a footbridge. The station has automated ticket machines, Manaca automated turnstiles and is staffed.

=== Platforms ===
1	■ Meitetsu Kōwa Line	For Chita Handa, Kōwa, and Utsumi
2	■ Meitetsu Kōwa Line	For Ōtagawa and Kanayama

== Station history ==
Minami Kagiya Station was opened on April 1, 1932 as a station on the Chita Railway. The Chita Railway became part of the Meitetsu group on February 2, 1943. A new station building was completed in 1983. In March 2007, the Tranpass system of magnetic fare cards with automatic turnstiles was implemented.

== Passenger statistics ==
In fiscal 2017, the station was used by an average of 8244 passengers daily.

== Surrounding area ==
- Kagaya Junior High School
- Tokai Minami High School

== See also ==
- List of railway stations in Japan
