= Fuki Station =

Railway station in Taketoyo, Aichi Prefecture, Japan

Fuki Station 富貴駅

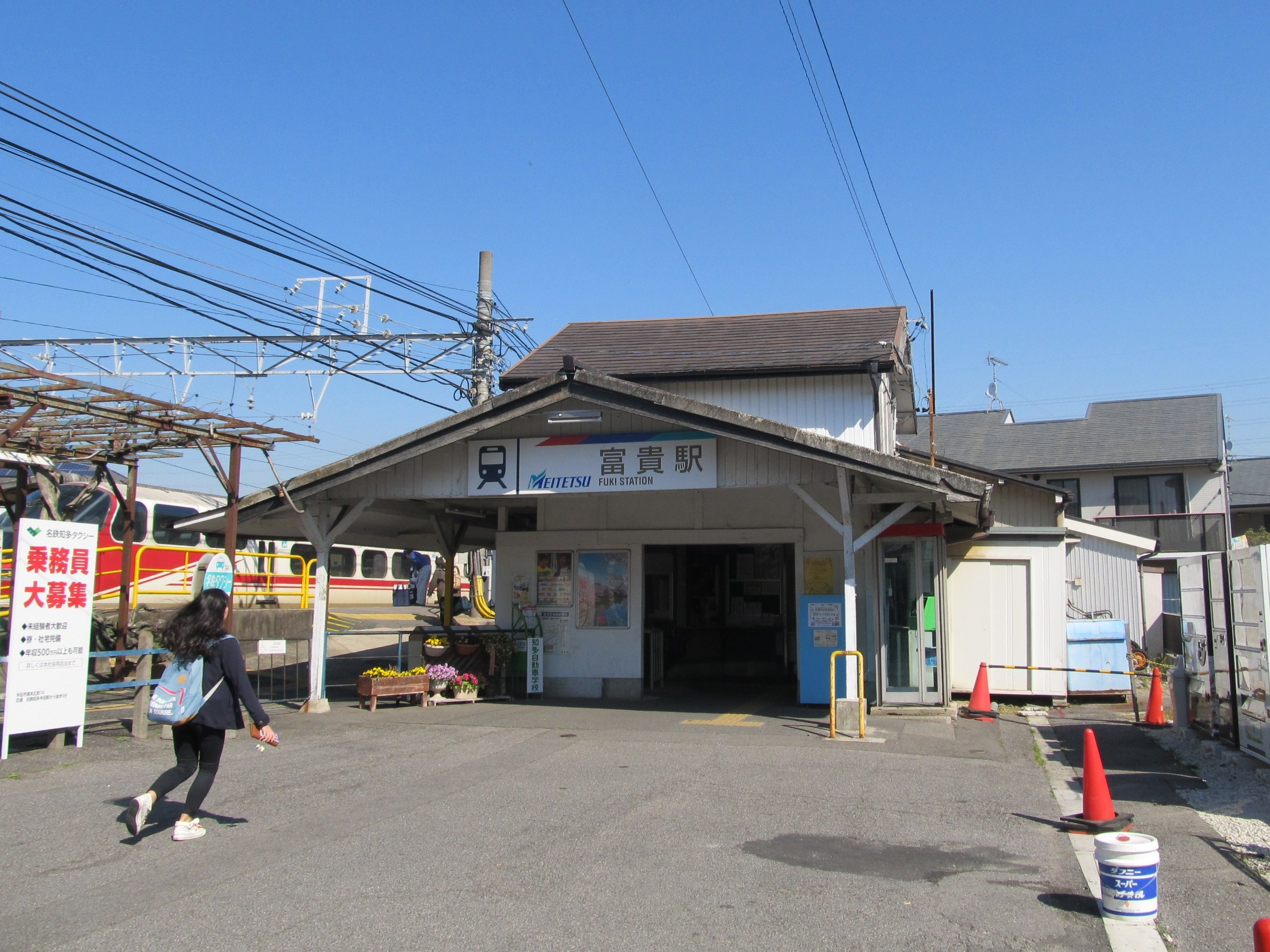
- Fuki Station in March 2015

General information
- Location: Fuki, Taketoyo-machi, Chita-gun, Aichi-ken 470-2531; Japan
- Coordinates: 34.8287°N 136.9164°E
- Operator: Meitetsu
- Line: ■ Meitetsu Kōwa Line
- Distance: 22.3 kilometers from Ōtagawa
- Platforms: 1 side + 1 island platform

Other information
- Status: Staffed
- Station code: KC17
- Website: Official website

History
- Opened: July 1, 1932

Passengers
- FY2018: 1234
Location
- Location within Aichi Prefecture Location within Japan

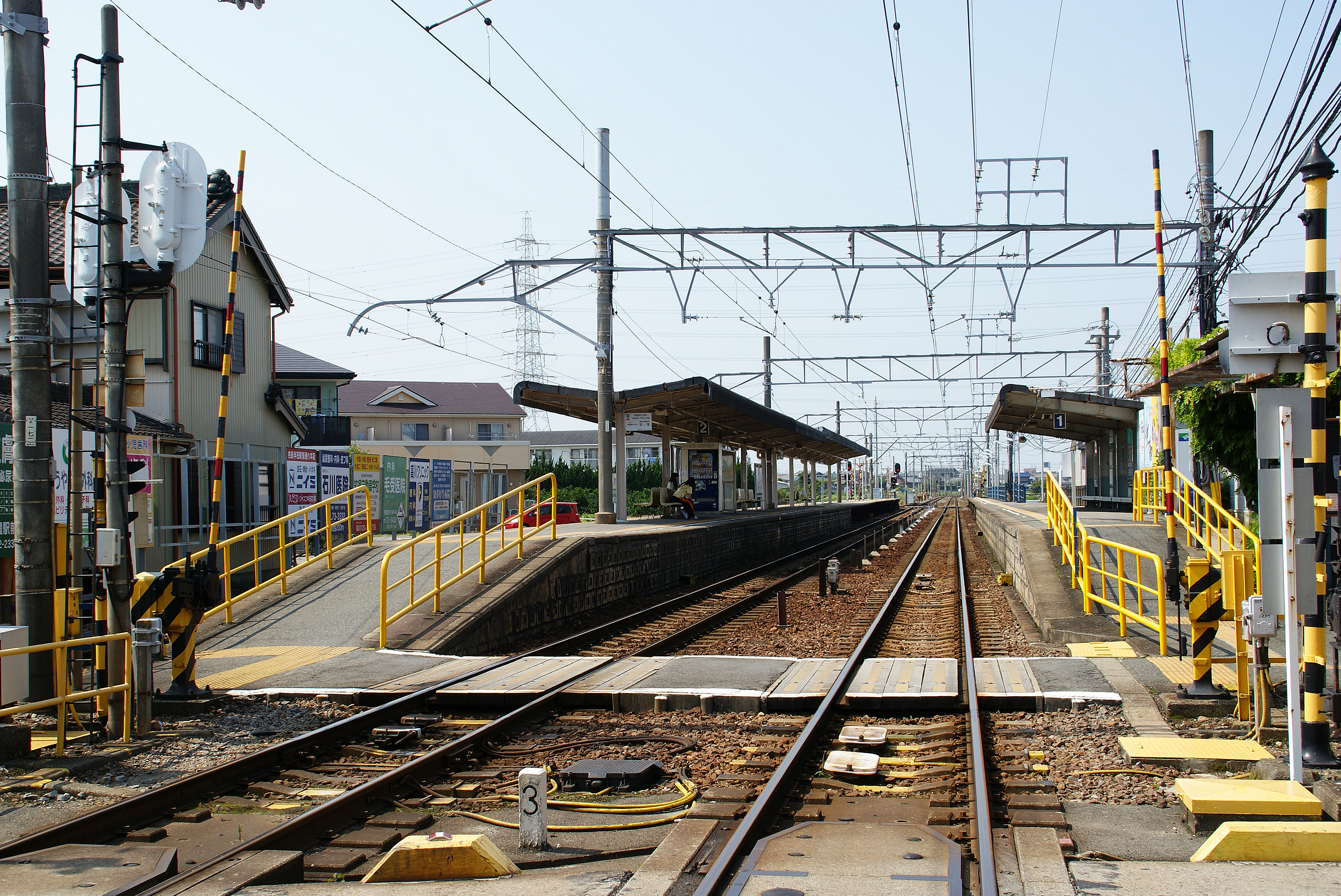
Platforms

Fuki Station (富貴駅, Fuki-eki) is a junction railway station in the town of Taketoyo, Chita District, Aichi Prefecture, Japan, operated by Meitetsu.

== Lines ==
Fuki Station is served by the Meitetsu Kōwa Line, and is located 22.3 kilometers from the starting point of the line at Ōtagawa. It is also the terminal station for the Meitetsu Chita New Line and is 13.9 kilometers from the opposing terminus of the line at Utsumi.

== Station layout ==
Fuki Station track diagram.

The station has a side platform and an island platform serving three tracks, connected by a level crossing. The station has automated ticket machines, Manaca automated turnstiles and is staffed.

=== Platforms ===
1	■ Meitetsu Kōwa Line	For Kōwa
	■ Meitetsu Chita New Line	For Utsumi
2	■ Meitetsu Kōwa Line	For Meitetsu Nagoya, Meitetsu Gifu, and Inuyama
	■ Meitetsu Kōwa Line	For Kōwa
3	■ Meitetsu Kōwa Line	For Meitetsu Nagoya, Meitetsu Gifu, and Inuyama
	■ Meitetsu Chita New Line	For Utsumi

== Adjacent stations ==
←	Service	→
Meitetsu Kōwa Line
Chita Taketoyo	Limited Express	Kōwaguchi
Chita Taketoyo	Rapid Express	Kōwaguchi
Chita Taketoyo	Express	Kōwaguchi
Chita Taketoyo	Semi Express	Kōwaguchi
Chita Taketoyo	Local	Kōwaguchi
Meitetsu Chita New Line
Chita Taketoyo	Limited Express	Kami Noma
Chita Taketoyo	Rapid Express	Kami Noma
Chita Taketoyo	Express	Kami Noma
Chita Taketoyo	Local	Kami Noma

== Station history ==
Fuki Station was opened on July 1, 1932 as a station on the Chita Railway. The Chita Railway became part of the Meitetsu group on February 2, 1943. The Chita New Line began operations from June 30, 1974. In 2007, the Tranpass system of magnetic fare cards with automatic turnstiles was implemented.

== Passenger statistics ==
In fiscal 2018, the station was used by an average of 1234 passengers daily (boarding passengers only).

== Surrounding area ==
- Taketoyo Thermal Power Station
- Fuki Junior High School
- Fuki Elementary School

== See also ==
- List of railway stations in Japan
