= Chita Taketoyo Station =

Railway station in Taketoyo, Aichi Prefecture, Japan

Chita Taketoyo Station 知多武豊駅

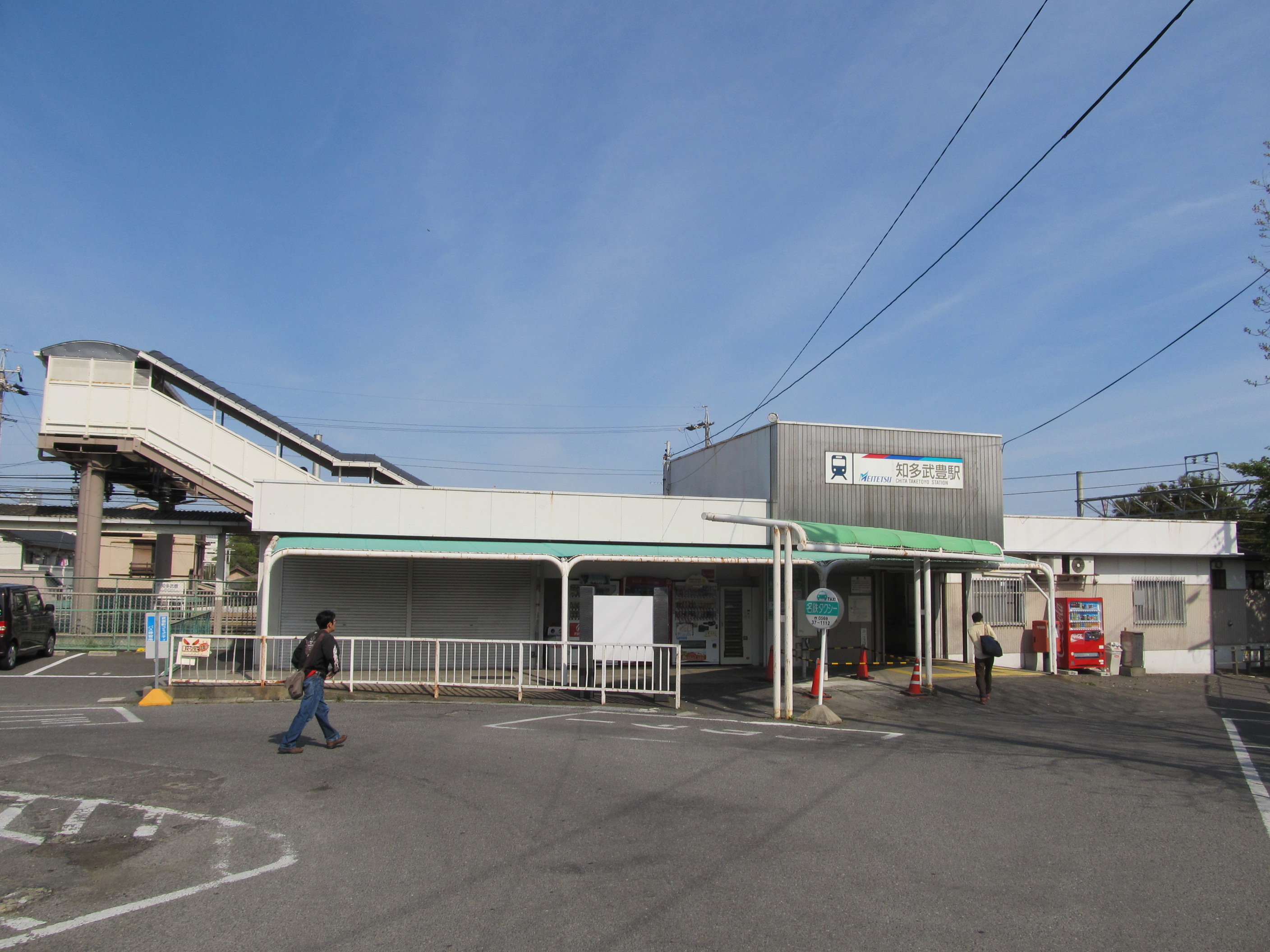
- West exit Chita Taketoyo Station, April 2014

General information
- Location: 43-8 Dozaki, Taketoyo-machi, Chita-gun, Aichi-ken 70-2347; Japan
- Coordinates: 34.8509°N 136.9162°E
- Operator: Meitetsu
- Line: ■ Meitetsu Kōwa Line
- Distance: 19.8 kilometers from Ōtagawa
- Platforms: 2 side platforms

Other information
- Status: Staffed
- Station code: KC16
- Website: Official website

History
- Opened: July 1, 1932

Passengers
- FY2018: 3181
Location
- Location within Aichi Prefecture Location within Japan

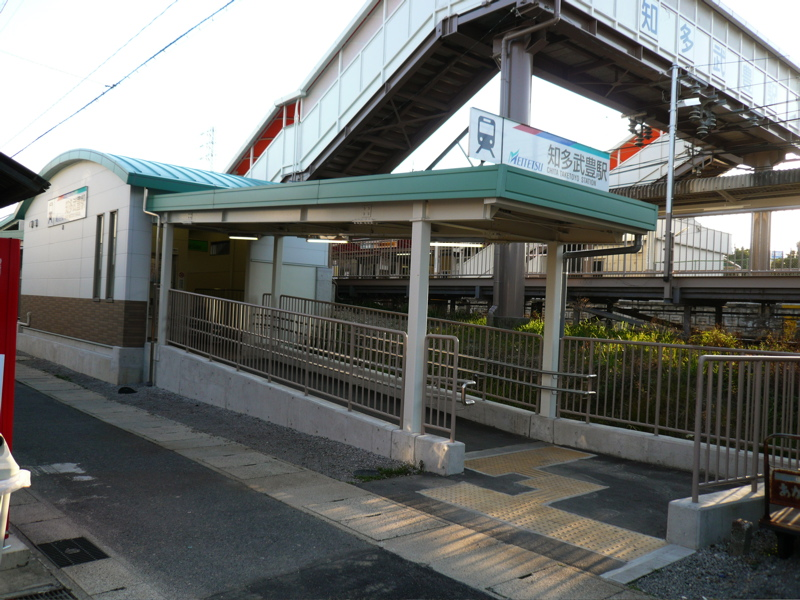
East exit

Chita Taketoyo Station (知多武豊駅, Chita Taketoyo-eki) is a railway station in the town of Taketoyo, Chita District, Aichi Prefecture, Japan, operated by Meitetsu.

== Lines ==
Chita Taketoyo Station is served by the Meitetsu Kōwa Line, and is located 19.8 kilometers from the starting point of the line at Ōtagawa.

== Station layout ==
The station has two opposed side platforms connected to the station building by a footbridge. The station has automated ticket machines, Manaca automated turnstiles and is staffed.

=== Platforms ===
1	■ Meitetsu Kōwa Line	For Kōwa, and Utsumi
2	■ Meitetsu Kōwa Line	For Chita Handa, Ōtagawa and Kanayama

== Adjacent stations ==
←	Service	→
Meitetsu Kōwa Line
Aoyama	Limited Express	Fuki
Aoyama	Rapid Express	Fuki
Aoyama	Express	Fuki
Aoyama	Semi Express	Fuki
Age	Local	Fuki

== Station history ==
Chita Taketoyo Station was opened on July 1, 1932, as a station on the Chita Railway. The Chita Railway became part of the Meitetsu group on February 2, 1943. In 2007, the Tranpass system of magnetic fare cards with automatic turnstiles was implemented.

== Passenger statistics ==
In fiscal 2018, the station was used by an average of 3181 passengers daily (boarding passengers only).

== Surrounding area ==
- Taketoyo Town Hall

== See also ==
- List of railway stations in Japan
