= Narawa Station =

Railway station in Handa, Aichi Prefecture, Japan

Narawa Station 成岩駅

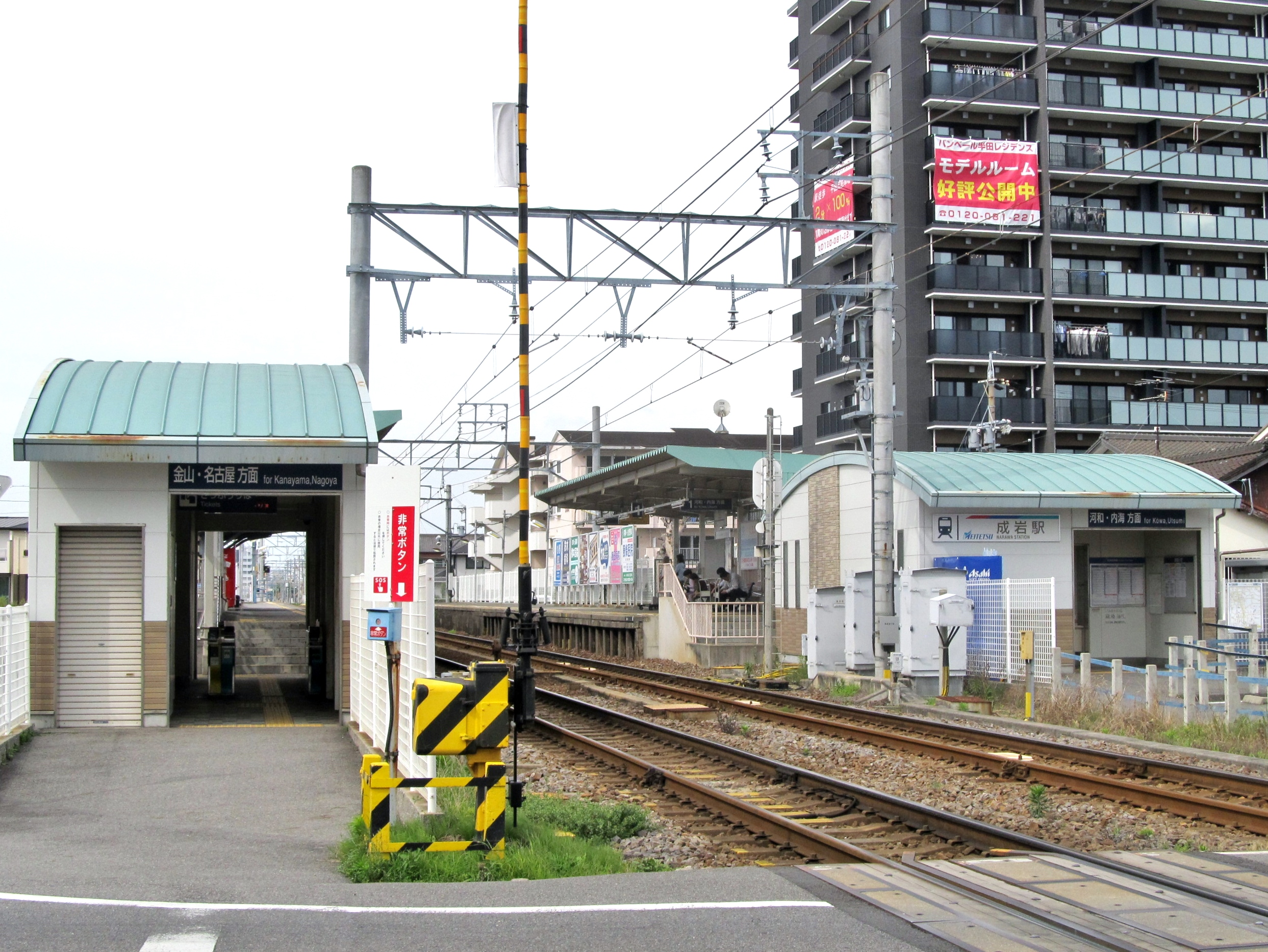
- Narawa Station, June 2018

General information
- Location: Sakae 3-304, Sakaemachi, Handa-shi, Aichi-ken 475-0846; Japan
- Coordinates: 34.8863°N 136.9220°E
- Operator: Meitetsu
- Line: ■ Meitetsu Kōwa Line
- Distance: 15.8 kilometers from Ōtagawa
- Platforms: 2 side platforms

Other information
- Status: Unstaffed
- Station code: KC13
- Website: Official website

History
- Opened: April 1, 1931

Passengers
- FY2018: 1105
Location
- Location within Aichi Prefecture Location within Japan

Narawa Station (成岩駅, Narawa-eki) is a railway station in the city of Handa, Aichi Prefecture, Japan, operated by Meitetsu.

== Lines ==
Narawa Station is served by the Meitetsu Kōwa Line, and is located 15.8 kilometers from the starting point of the line at Ōtagawa.

== Station layout ==
The station has two opposed side platforms connected by a level crossing. The station is unattended.

=== Platforms ===
1	■ Meitetsu Kōwa Line	For Kōwa, and Utsumi
2	■ Meitetsu Kōwa Line	For Chita Handa, Ōtagawa and Kanayama

== Adjacent stations ==
←	Service	→
Meitetsu Kōwa Line
Limited Express: Does not stop at this station
Chita Handa	Rapid Express	Aoyama
Chita Handa	Express	Aoyama
Chita Handa	Semi Express	Aoyama
Chita Handa	Local	Aoyama

== Station history ==
Narawa Station was opened on April 1, 1931 as a station on the Chita Railway. The Chita Railway became part of the Meitetsu group on February 2, 1943. In February 2007, the Tranpass system of magnetic fare cards with automatic turnstiles was implemented, and the station has been unattended since that time.

== Passenger statistics ==
In fiscal 2018, the station was used by an average of 1105 passengers daily (boarding passengers only).

== Surrounding area ==
- Narawa Junior High School
- Narawa Elementary School

== See also ==
- List of railway stations in Japan
