= Sumiyoshichō Station =

Railway station in Handa, Aichi Prefecture, Japan

Sumiyoshichō Station 住吉町駅

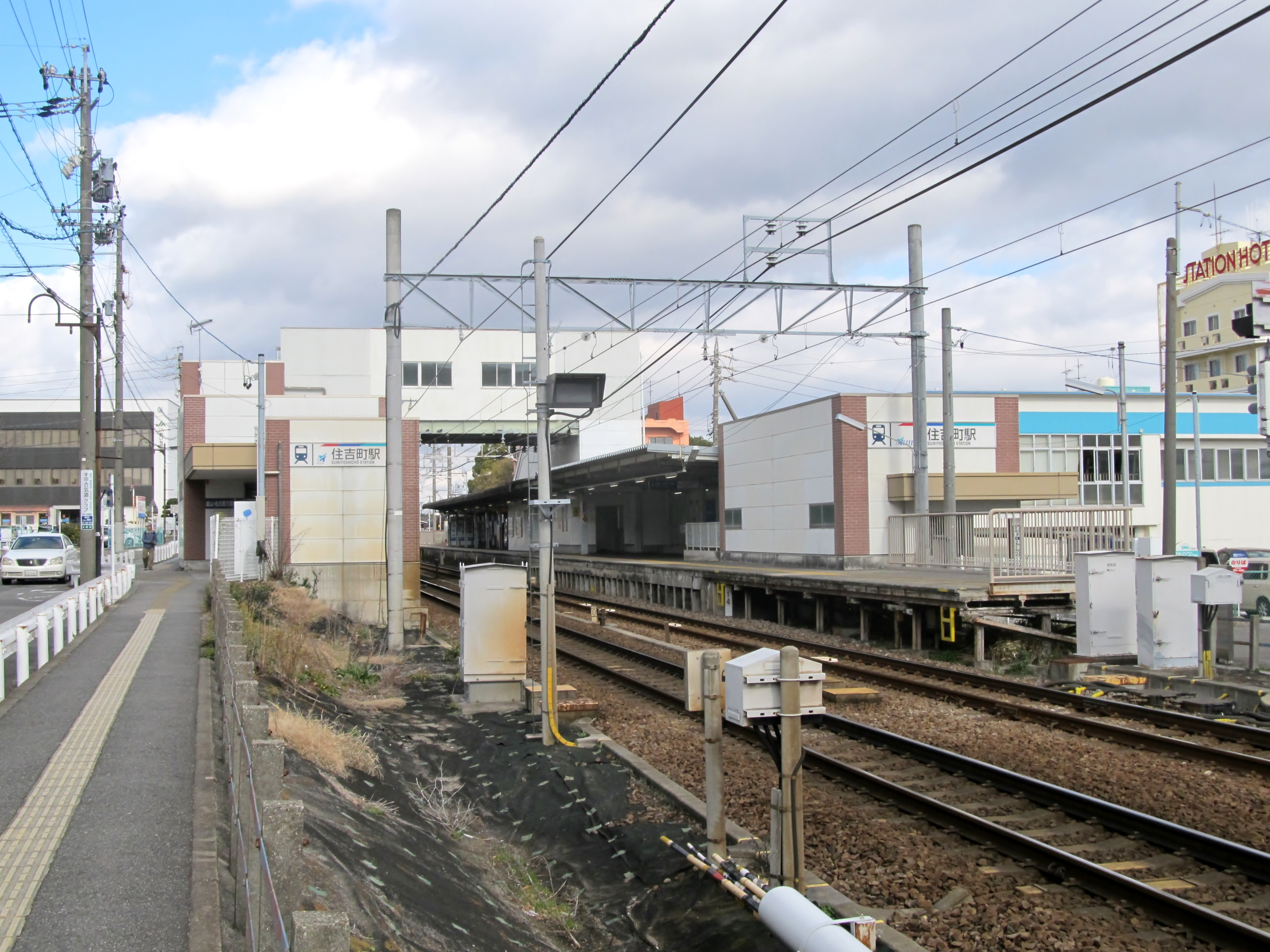
- Sumiyoshichō Station in January 2022

General information
- Location: 156-2 Miyaji-chō Handa-shi, Aichi-ken 475-0902; Japan
- Coordinates: 34.9020°N 136.9257°E
- Operator: Meitetsu
- Line: Kōwa Line
- Distance: 14.0 kilometers from Ōtagawa
- Platforms: 2 side platforms

Other information
- Status: Staffed
- Station code: KC11
- Website: Official website

History
- Opened: July 10, 1933
- Former names: Nōgakkōmae (until 1949)

Passengers
- FY2018: 3284 daily

Services
Preceding station	Meitetsu	Following station
Chita Handa towards Kōwa	Kōwa Line Rapid Express Express Semi-Express	Agui towards Ōtagawa
Chita Handa towards Kōwa	Kōwa Line Local	Handaguchi towards Ōtagawa
Location
- Location within Aichi Prefecture Location within Japan

Sumiyoshichō Station (住吉町駅, Sumiyoshichō-eki) is a railway station in the city of Handa, Aichi Prefecture, Japan, operated by Meitetsu.

== Lines ==
Sumiyoshichō Station is served by the Meitetsu Kōwa Line, and is located 14.0 kilometers from the starting point of the line at Ōtagawa.

== Station layout ==
The station has two opposed side platforms connected by a footbridge. The station is staffed.

=== Platforms ===
1	■ Meitetsu Kōwa Line	For Chita Handa, Kōwa, and Utsumi
2	■ Meitetsu Kōwa Line	For Ōtagawa and Kanayama

== Station history ==
Sumiyoshichō Station was opened on July 10, 1933, as Nōgakkōmae Station (農学校前駅, Nōgakkōmae-eki) on the Chita Railway. The Chita Railway became part of the Meitetsu group on February 2, 1943. The station was renamed to its present name on December 1, 1949. A new station building was completed in June 1982. In July 2006, the Tranpass system of magnetic fare cards with automatic turnstiles was implemented.

== Passenger statistics ==
In fiscal 2018, the station was used by an average of 3284 passengers daily (boarding passengers only).

== Surrounding area ==
- Handa High School
- Handa Agricultural High School
- Handa Technical High School

== See also ==
- List of railway stations in Japan
