= Agui Station =

Railway station in Agui, Aichi Prefecture, Japan

Agui Station 阿久比駅

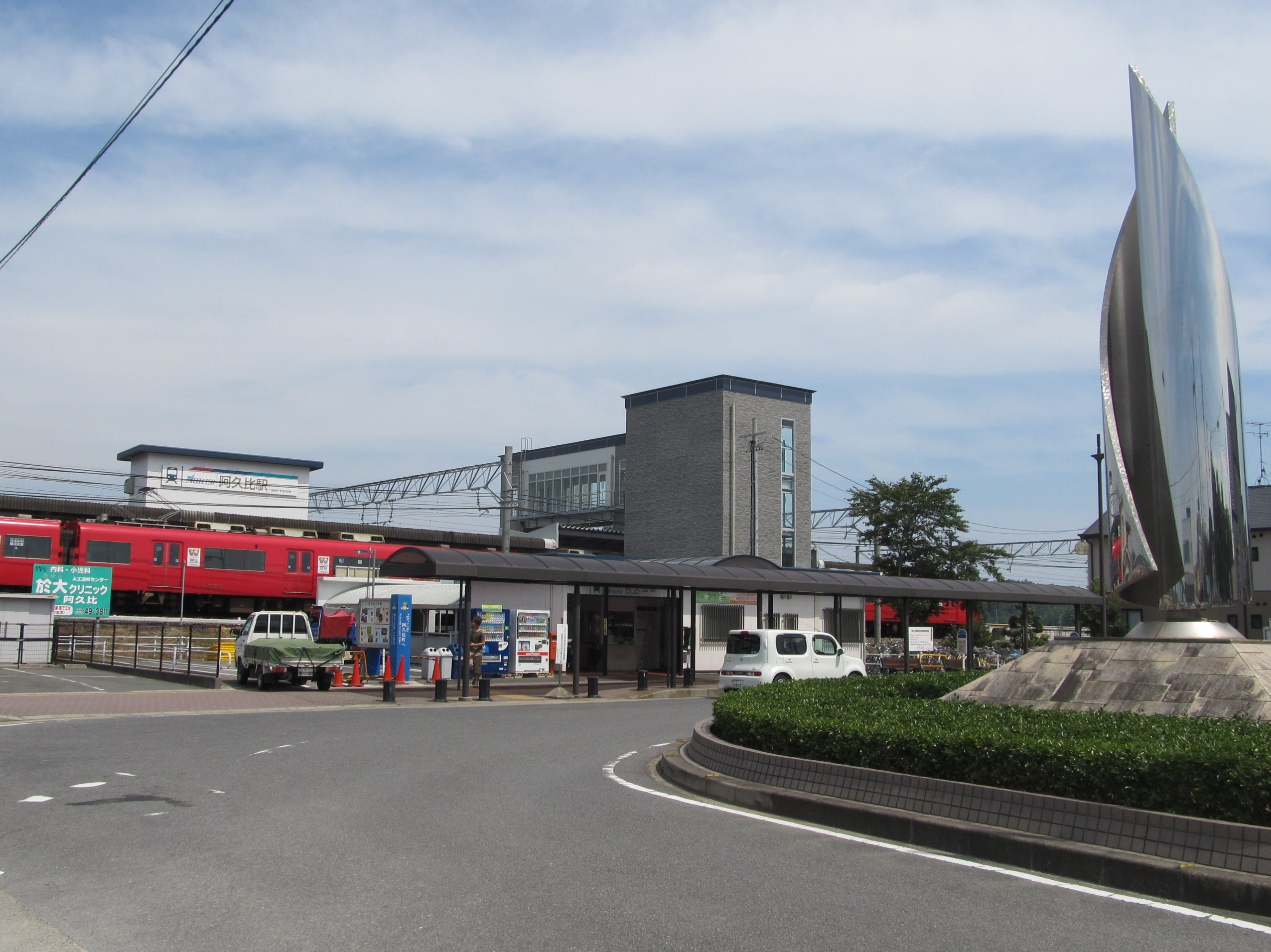
- Agui Station in August 2015

General information
- Location: Aguiekimae 1-13, Agui-machi, Chita-gun, Aichi-ken 470-2213; Japan
- Coordinates: 34.9310°N 136.9186°E
- Line: ■ Meitetsu Kōwa Line
- Distance: 10.6 kilometers from Ōtagawa
- Platforms: 2 island platforms

Other information
- Status: Staffed
- Station code: KC08
- Website: Official website

History
- Opened: July 21, 1983

Passengers
- FY2017: 3207 daily
Location
- Location within Aichi Prefecture Location within Japan

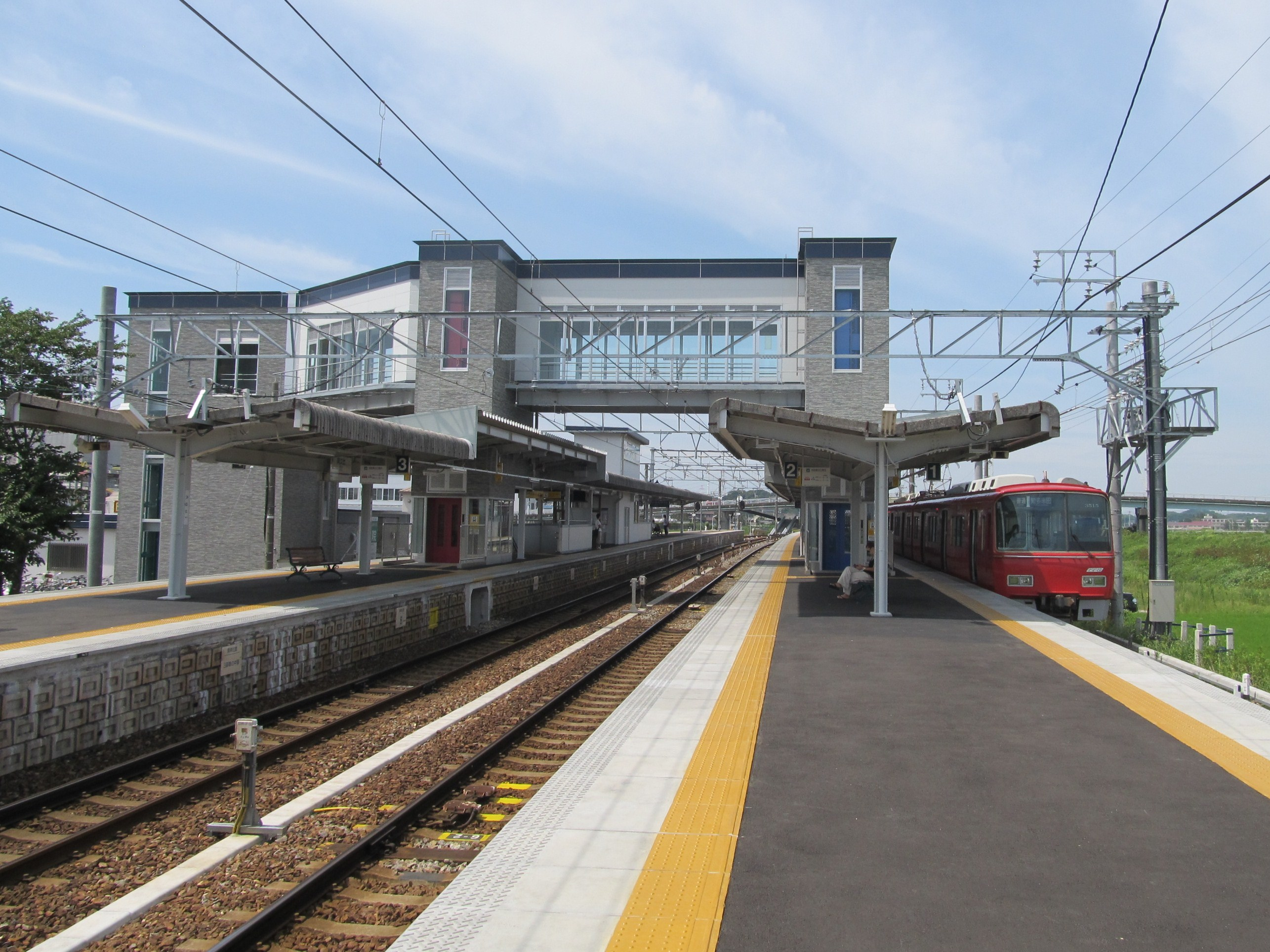
Platforms

Agui Station (阿久比駅, Agui-eki) is a railway station in the town of Agui, Chita District, Aichi Prefecture, Japan, operated by Meitetsu.

== Lines ==
Agui Station is served by the Meitetsu Kōwa Line, and is located 10.6 kilometers from the starting point of the line at Ōtagawa.

== Station layout ==
The station has two island platforms connected by a footbridge. The station is staffed.

=== Platforms ===
1	■ Meitetsu Kōwa Line	For Chita Handa, Kōwa, and Utsumi
2	■ Meitetsu Kōwa Line	For Chita Handa, Kōwa, and Utsumi
3	■ Meitetsu Kōwa Line	For Ōtagawa, Meitetsu Nagoya, Meitetsu Gifu, and Inuyama
4	■ Meitetsu Kōwa Line	For Ōtagawa, Meitetsu Nagoya, Meitetsu Gifu, and Inuyama

== Adjacent stations ==
←	Service	→
Meitetsu Kōwa Line
Ōtagawa	Limited Express	Chita Handa
Tatsumigaoka	Rapid Express	Sumiyoshichō
Tatsumigaoka	Express	Sumiyoshichō
Tatsumigaoka	Local Express	Sumiyoshichō
Sakabe	Local	Uedai

== Station history ==
Agui Station was opened on July 21, 1983, replacing neighboring Mukuoka Station (椋岡駅, Mukuoka-eki), which was located in an inconvenient location from the town center and which was closed. In July 2006, the Tranpass system of magnetic fare cards with automatic turnstiles was implemented.

== Passenger statistics ==
In fiscal 2017, the station was used by an average of 3207 passengers daily (boarding passengers only).

== Surrounding area ==
- Agui town hall
- Agui High School School
- Agui Junior High School

== See also ==
- List of railway stations in Japan
