= Age Station =

Railway station in Taketoyo, Aichi Prefecture, Japan

Age Station 上ゲ駅

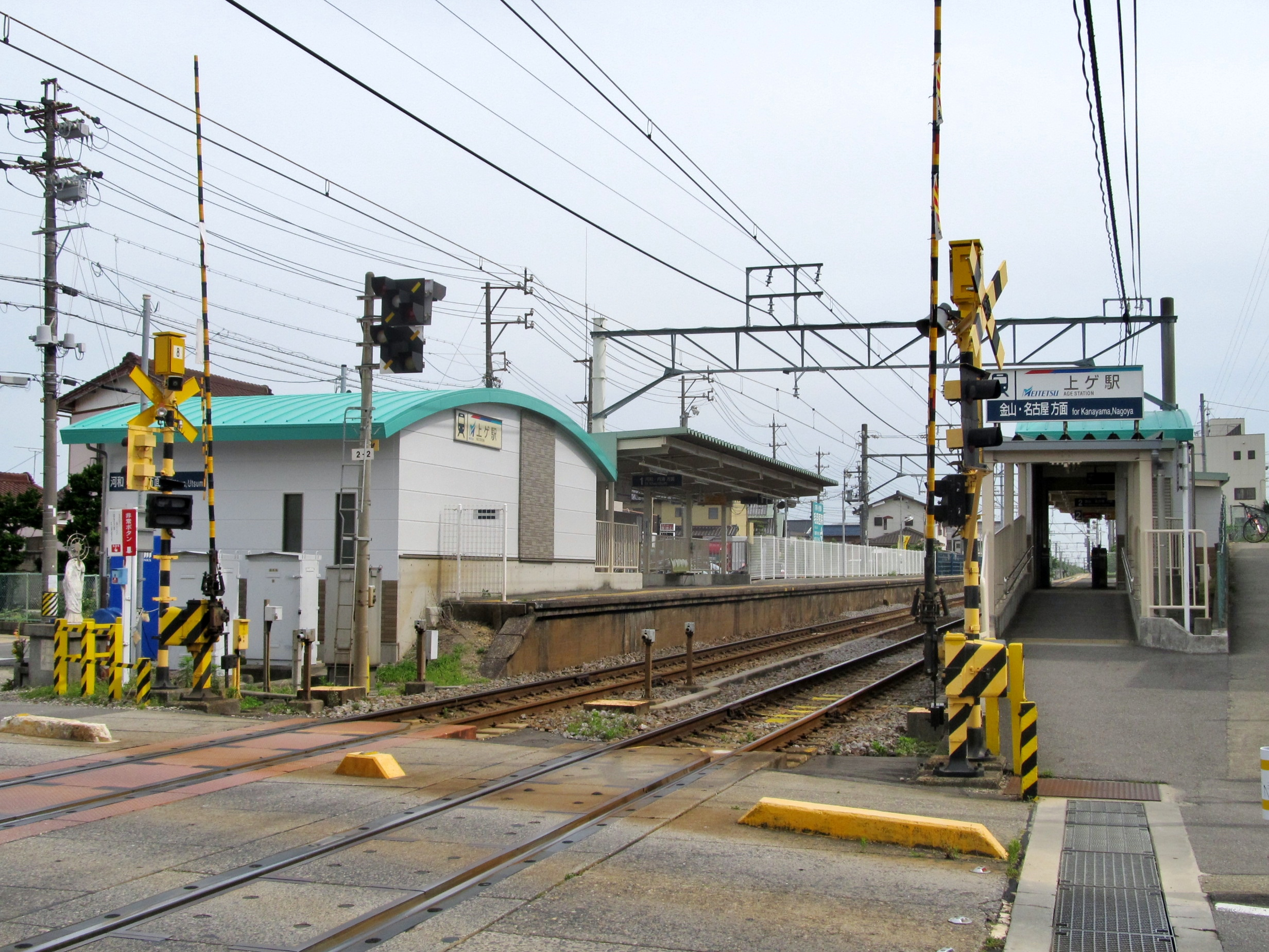
- Age Station in June 2018

General information
- Location: Shitamon 23-5, Taketoyo-machi, Chita-gun, Aichi-ken 470-2339; Japan
- Coordinates: 34.8583°N 136.9161°E
- Operator: Meitetsu
- Line: ■ Meitetsu Kōwa Line
- Distance: 19.2 kilometers from Ōtagawa
- Platforms: 1 side platforms

Other information
- Status: Unstaffed
- Station code: KC15
- Website: Official website

History
- Opened: July 1, 1932

Passengers
- 2006: 53,857
Location
- Location within Aichi Prefecture Location within Japan

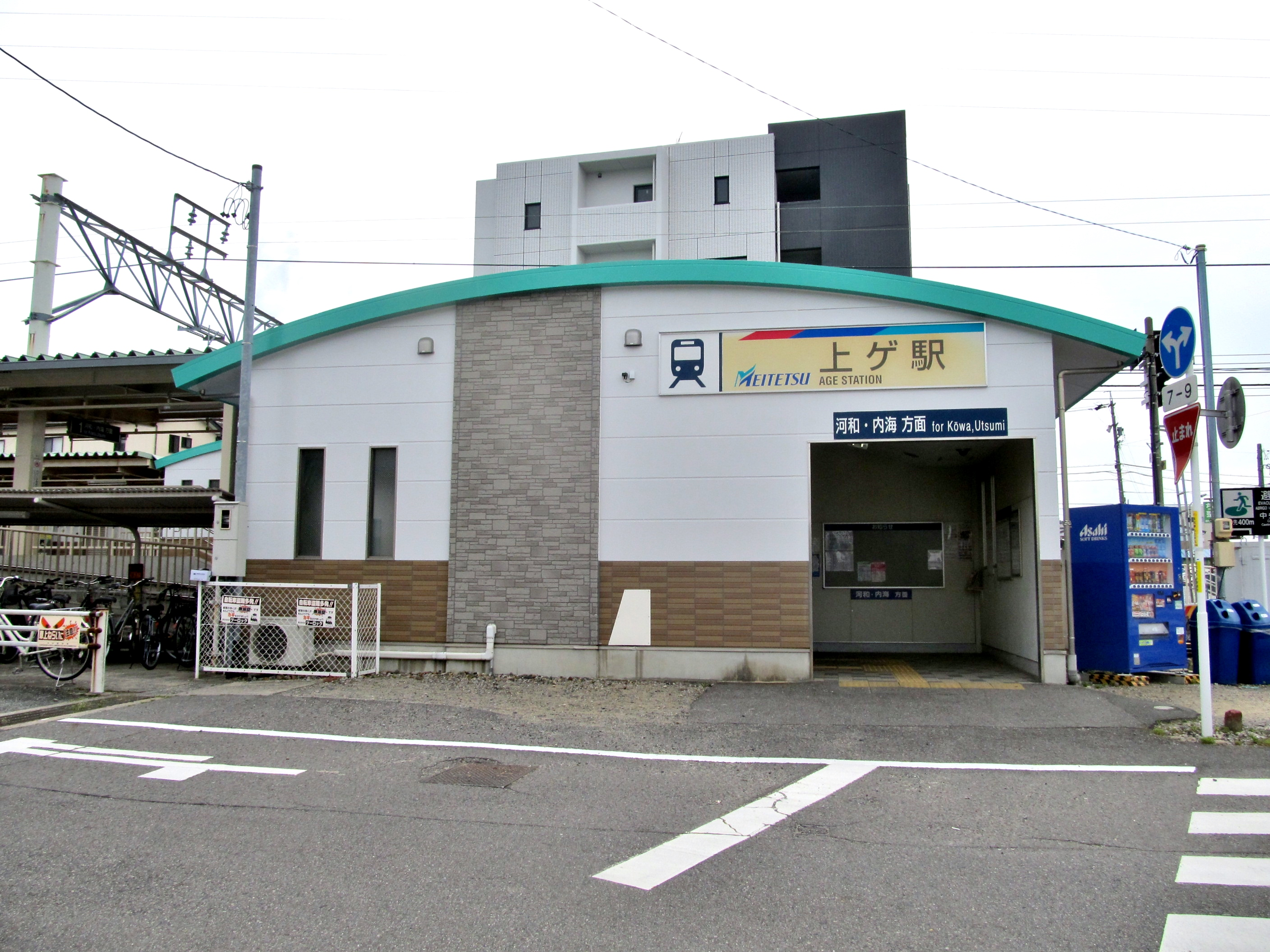
Front view

Age Station (上ゲ駅, Age-eki) is a railway station in the town of Taketoyo, Chita District, Aichi Prefecture, Japan, operated by Meitetsu.

== Lines ==
Age Station is served by the Meitetsu Kōwa Line, and is located 19.2 kilometers from the starting point of the line at Ōtagawa.

== Station layout ==
Age Station has two opposed side platforms connected by a level crossing. The station has automated ticket machines, Manaca automated turnstiles and is unattended.

=== Platforms ===
1	■ Meitetsu Kōwa Line	For Kōwa, and Utsumi
2	■ Meitetsu Kōwa Line	For Chita Handa, Ōtagawa and Kanayama

== Adjacent stations ==
←	Service	→
Meitetsu Kōwa Line
Limited Express: Does not stop at this station
Rapid Express: Does not stop at this station
Express: Does not stop at this station
Semi Express: Does not stop at this station
Aoyama	Local	Chita Taketoyo

== Station history ==
Age Station was opened on July 1, 1932, as a station on the Chita Railway. The Chita Railway became part of the Meitetsu group on February 2, 1943. In 2007, the Tranpass system of magnetic fare cards with automatic turnstiles was implemented.

== Passenger statistics ==
In fiscal 2018, the station was used by an average of 583 passengers daily (boarding passengers only).

== Surrounding area ==
- Japan National Route 247
- Taketoyo Town Folk Historical Museum

== See also ==
- List of railway stations in Japan
