= Aoyama Station (Aichi) =

Railway station in Handa, Aichi Prefecture, Japan

Aoyama Station 青山駅

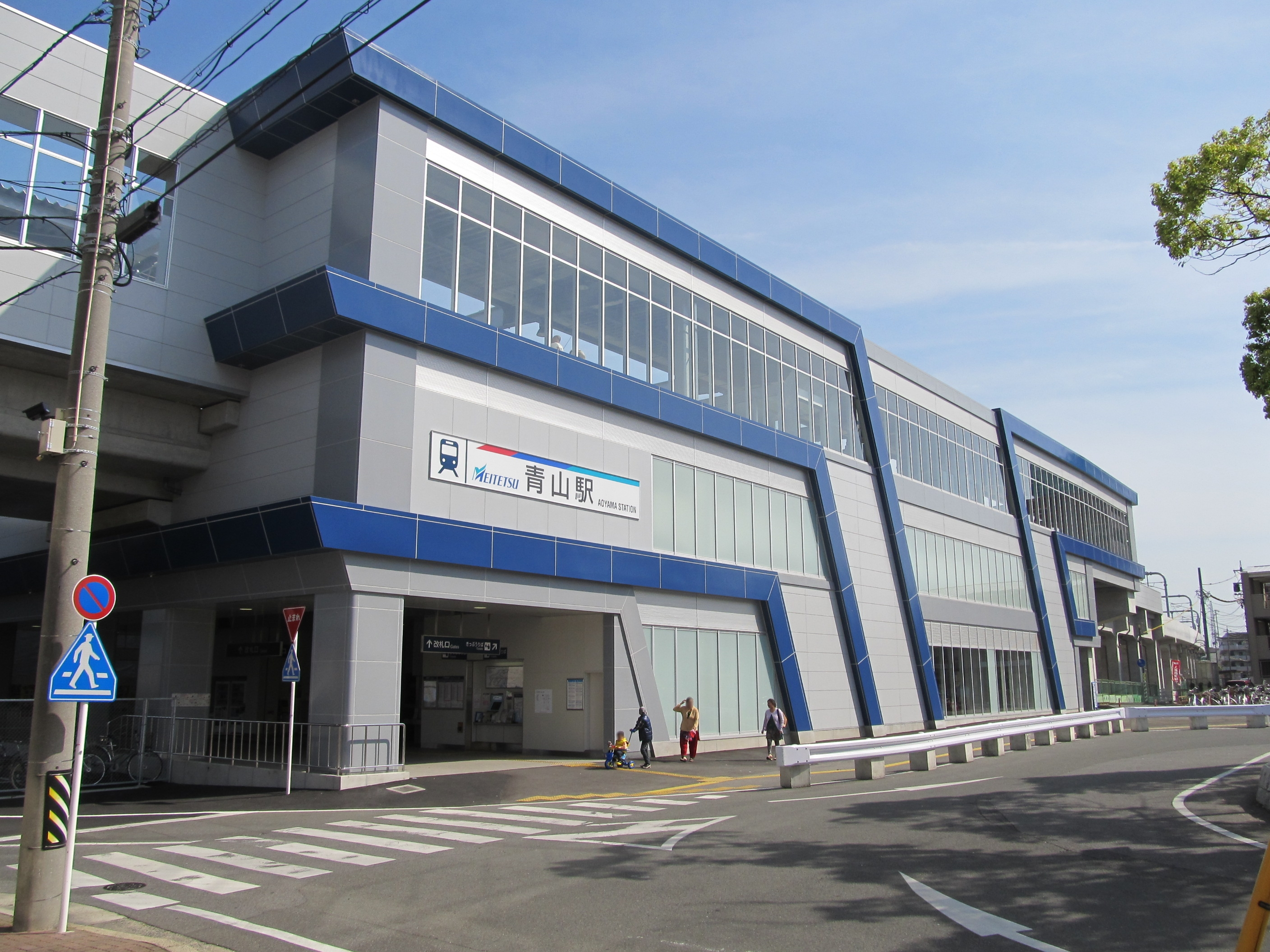
- Station building, April 2014

General information
- Location: Aoyama 1-13-2, Handa, Aichi （愛知県半田市青山一丁目１３番地２） Japan
- Coordinates: 34°52′42″N 136°55′1.6″E
- Operator: Nagoya Railroad
- Line: Meitetsu Kōwa Line

History
- Opened: 1933
- Former names: Minami Narawa (until 2005)

Passengers
- 2006: 1,029,097
Location

Aoyama Station (青山駅, Aoyama-eki) is a railway station operated by Meitetsu's Kōwa Line located in Handa, Aichi Prefecture, Japan. It is located 16.8 rail kilometers from the terminus of the line at Ōtagawa Station.

== History ==
Aoyama Station was opened on July 10, 1933, as Minami Narawa Station (南成岩駅, Minami Narawa-eki)on the Chita Railway. The Chita Railway became part of the Meitetsu group on February 2, 1943. A new station building was completed in April 1993. On January 29, 2005, the station was renamed to its present name. In July 2006, the Tranpass system of magnetic fare cards with automatic turnstiles was implemented, and the station became unattended after that date. The station building was reconstructed in 2010. A railway elevation project around this station was completed in 2013.

== Lines ==
- Meitetsu
  - Kōwa Line

== Layout ==
Aoyama Station has two opposed side platforms.

=== Platforms ===
1	■ Meitetsu Kōwa Line	For Kōwa, and Utsumi
2	■ Meitetsu Kōwa Line	For Chita Handa, Ōtagawa and Kanayama

== Adjacent stations ==
←	Service	→
Meitetsu Kōwa Line
Chita Handa	Limited Express	Chita Taketoyo
Narawa	Rapid Express	Chita Taketoyo
Narawa	Express	Chita Taketoyo
Narawa	Semi Express	Chita Taketoyo
Narawa	Local	Age
