= Shirasawa Station (Aichi) =

Railway station in Agui, Aichi Prefecture, Japan

Shirasawa Station 白沢駅

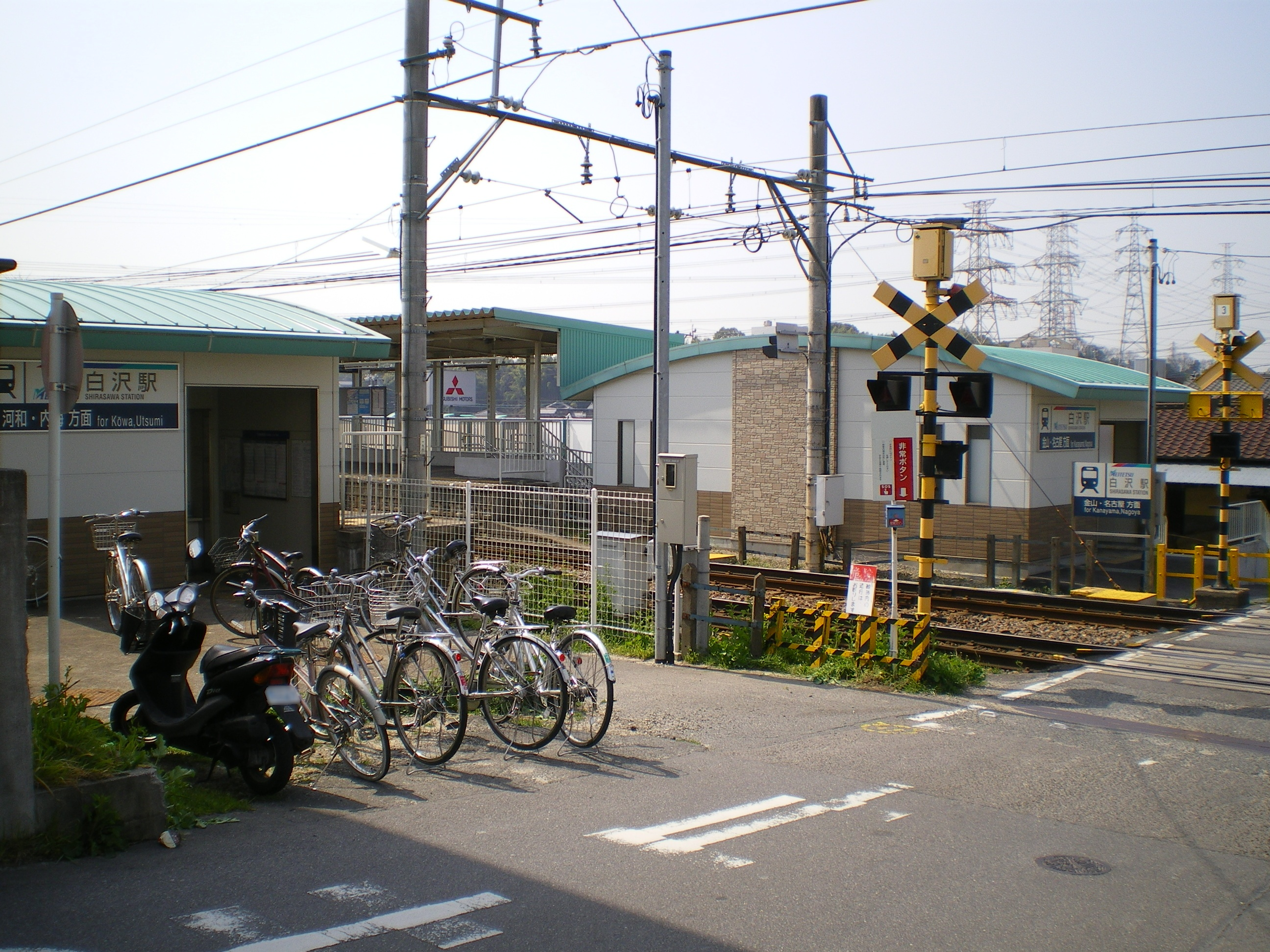
- Shirasawa Station in June 2018

General information
- Location: Toyoishiyama-17 Shirasawa, Agui-machi, Chita-gun, Aichi-ken 470-2201; Japan
- Coordinates: 34.9553°N 136.915°E
- Operator: Meitetsu
- Line: ■ Meitetsu Kōwa Line
- Distance: 7.9 kilometers from Ōtagawa
- Platforms: 2 side platforms

Other information
- Status: Unstaffed
- Station code: KC06
- Website: Official website

History
- Opened: April 1, 1931
- Former names: Chita Shirasawa Station (to 1949)

Passengers
- FY2017: 260 daily
Location
- Location within Aichi Prefecture Location within Japan

Shirasawa Station (白沢駅, Shirasawa-eki) is a railway station in the town of Agui, Chita District, Aichi Prefecture, Japan, operated by Meitetsu.

== Lines ==
Uedai Station is served by the Meitetsu Kōwa Line, and is located 7.9 kilometers from the starting point of the line at Ōtagawa.

== Station layout ==
The station has two opposed side platforms connected by a level crossing. The platforms are short, and can handle trains of only six carriages or less. The station is unattended.

=== Platforms ===
1	■ Meitetsu Kōwa Line	For Chita Handa, Kōwa, and Utsumi
2	■ Meitetsu Kōwa Line	For Ōtagawa and Kanayama

== Adjacent stations ==
←	Service	→
Meitetsu Kōwa Line
Limited Express: Does not stop at this station
Rapid Express: Does not stop at this station
Express: Does not stop at this station
Semi Express: Does not stop at this station
Tatsumigaoka	Local	Sakabe

== Station history ==
Shirasawa Station was opened on April 1, 1931, as Chita Shirasawa Station (知多白沢駅, Chita Shirasawa-eki) on the Chita Railway. The Chita Railway became part of the Meitetsu group on February 2, 1943. The station was renamed to its present name on December 1, 1949, and has also been unattended since 1949. In March 2007, the Tranpass system of magnetic fare cards with automatic turnstiles was implemented.

== Passenger statistics ==
In fiscal 2017, the station was used by an average of 260 passengers daily (boarding passengers only).

== Surrounding area ==
- Agui Kitahara Nursing School

== See also ==
- List of railway stations in Japan
