= Handaguchi Station =

Railway station in Handa, Aichi Prefecture, Japan

Handaguchi Station 半田口駅

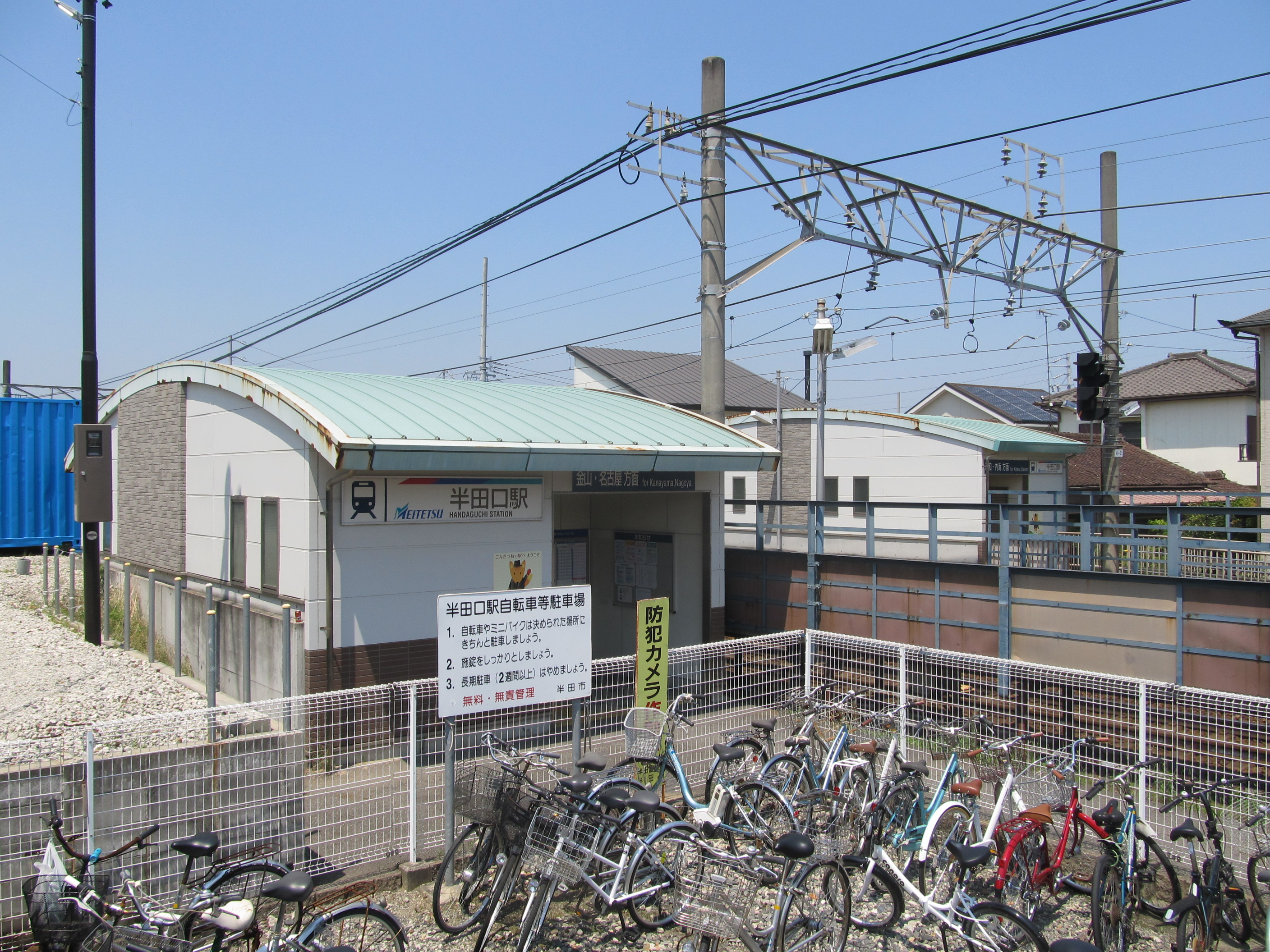
- Handaguchi Station in June 2018

General information
- Location: Yanabenakamachi 2-150, Handa-shi, Aichi-ken 475-0961; Japan
- Coordinates: 34.9089°N 136.9255°E
- Operator: Meitetsu
- Line: ■ Meitetsu Kōwa Line
- Distance: 13.2 kilometers from Ōtagawa
- Platforms: 2 side platforms

Other information
- Status: Unstaffed
- Station code: KC10
- Website: Official website

History
- Opened: April 1, 1932

Passengers
- FY2013: 932
Location
- Location within Aichi Prefecture Location within Japan

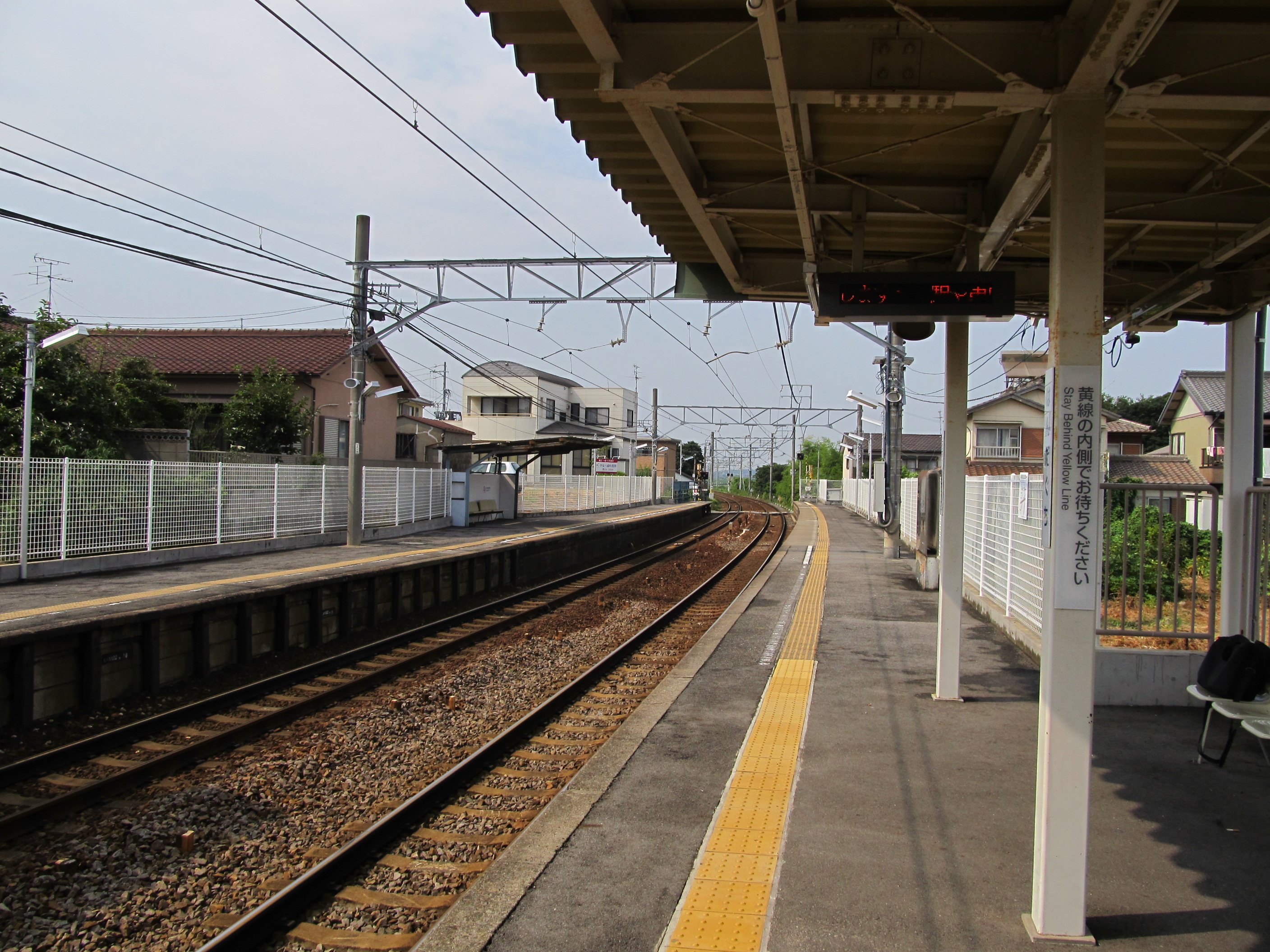
Platforms

Handaguchi Station (半田口駅, Handaguchi-eki) is a railway station in the city of Handa, Aichi Prefecture, Japan, operated by Meitetsu.

== Lines ==
Handaguchi Station is served by the Meitetsu Kōwa Line, and is located 13.2 kilometers from the starting point of the line at Ōtagawa.

== Station layout ==
The station has two opposed side platforms connected by a level crossing. The station is unattended.

=== Platforms ===
1	■ Meitetsu Kōwa Line	For Chita Handa, Kōwa, and Utsumi
2	■ Meitetsu Kōwa Line	For Ōtagawa and Kanayama

== Adjacent stations ==
←	Service	→
Meitetsu Kōwa Line
Limited Express: Does not stop at this station
Rapid Express: Does not stop at this station
Express: Does not stop at this station
Semi Express: Does not stop at this station
Uedai	Local	Sumiyoshichō

== Station history ==
Handaguchi Station was opened on April 1, 1932 as a station on the Chita Railway. The Chita Railway became part of the Meitetsu group on February 2, 1943, but the station was closed in 1944. The station was reopened on November 3, 1947. In March 2007, the Tranpass system of magnetic fare cards with automatic turnstiles was implemented.

== Surrounding area ==
- Handa Junior High School
- Iwanami Elementary School

== See also ==
- List of railway stations in Japan
