= Uedai Station =

Railway station in Agui, Aichi Prefecture, Japan

Uedai Station 植大駅

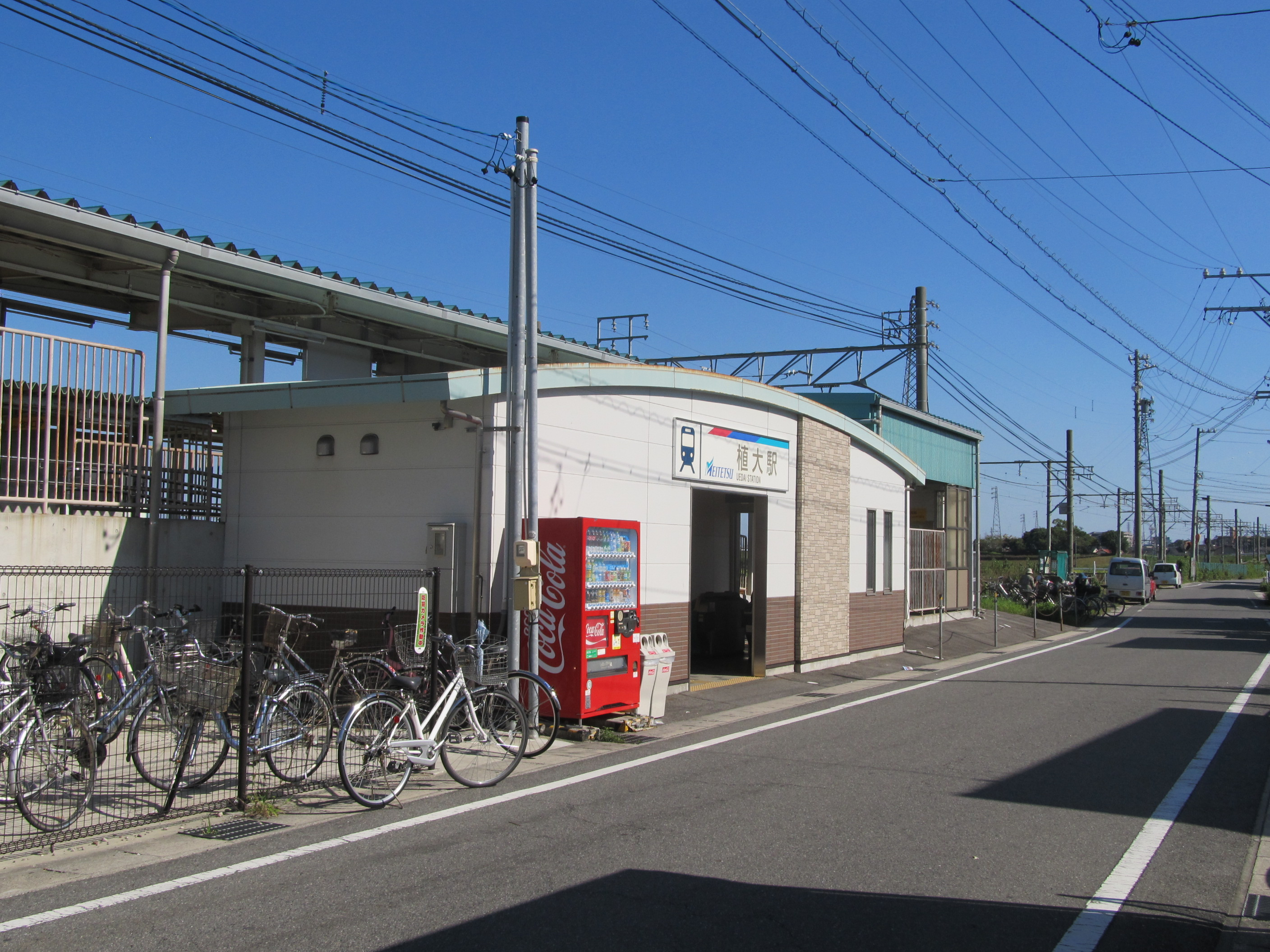
- Uedai Station in September 2014

General information
- Location: Uedai Ōmaeda 4-3, Agui-cho, Chita-gun, Aichi-ken 470-2216; Japan
- Coordinates: 34.9173°N 136.9235°E
- Operator: Meitetsu
- Line: ■ Meitetsu Kōwa Line
- Distance: 12.2 kilometers from Ōtagawa
- Platforms: 2 side platforms

Other information
- Status: Unstaffed
- Station code: KC09
- Website: Official website

History
- Opened: April 1, 1931

Passengers
- FY2017: 728 daily
Location
- Location within Aichi Prefecture Location within Japan

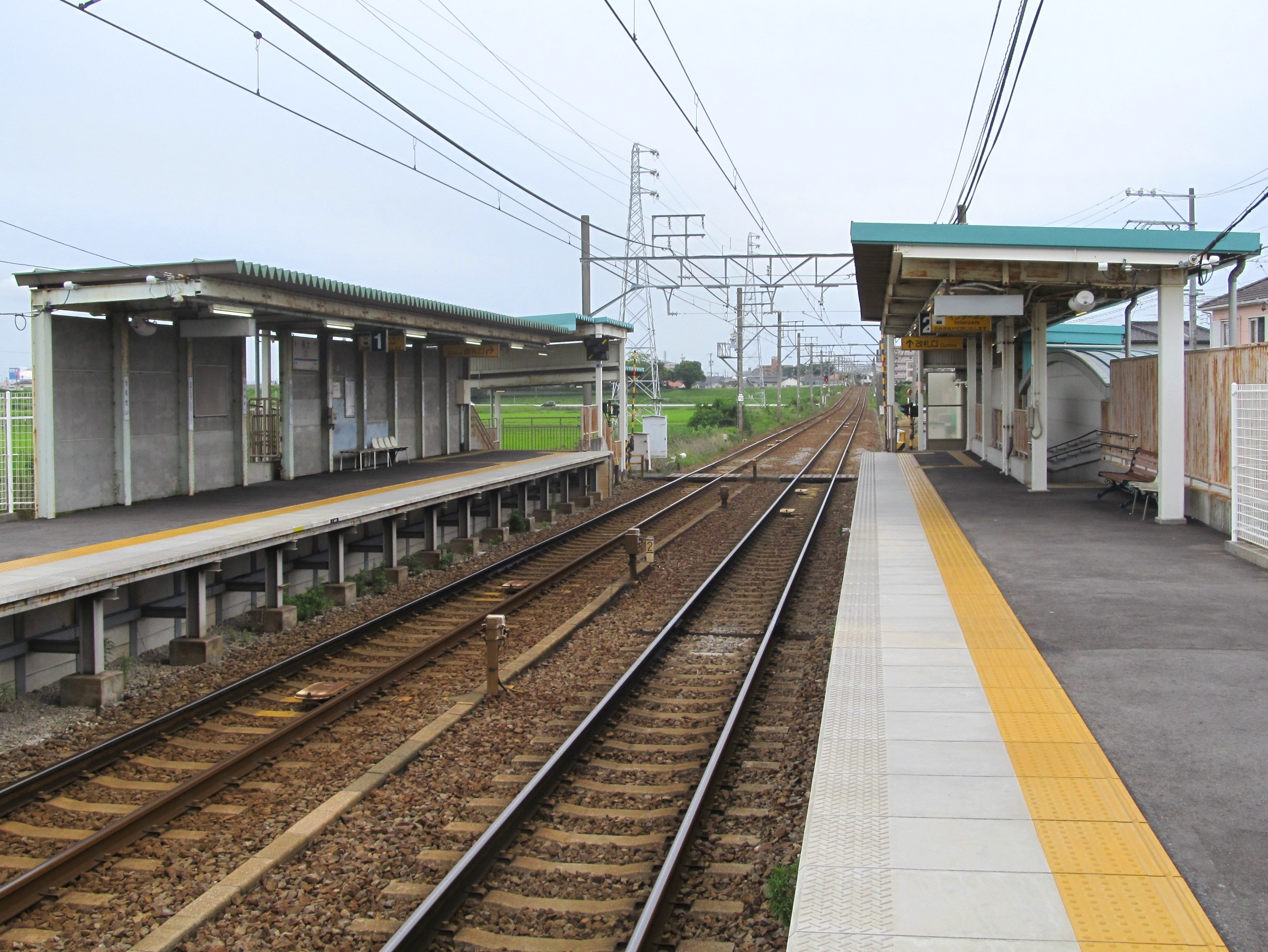
Platforms

Uedai Station (植大駅, Uedai-eki) is a railway station in the town of Agui, Chita District, Aichi Prefecture, Japan, operated by Meitetsu.

== Lines ==
Uedai Station is served by the Meitetsu Kōwa Line, and is located 12.2 kilometers from the starting point of the line at Ōtagawa.

== Station layout ==
The station has two opposed side platforms connected by a level crossing. The platforms are short, and can handle trains of only six carriages or less. The station is unattended.

=== Platforms ===
1	■ Meitetsu Kōwa Line	for Chita Handa, Kōwa, and Utsumi
2	■ Meitetsu Kōwa Line	for Ōtagawa and Kanayama

== Adjacent stations ==
←	Service	→
Meitetsu Kōwa Line
Limited Express: Does not stop at this station
Rapid Express: Does not stop at this station
Express: Does not stop at this station
Semi Express: Does not stop at this station
Agui	Local	Handaguchi

== Station history ==
Uedai Station was opened on April 1, 1931 as a station on the Chita Railway. The Chita Railway became part of the Meitetsu group on February 2, 1943. In February 2007, the Tranpass system of magnetic fare cards with automatic turnstiles was implemented, and the station has been unattended since that time.

== Passenger statistics ==
In fiscal 2017, the station was used by an average of 728 passengers daily (boarding passengers only).

== Surrounding area ==
- Agui Nanbu Elementary School

== See also ==
- List of railway stations in Japan
