= Kōwaguchi Station =

Railway station in Mihama, Aichi Prefecture, Japan

Kōwaguchi Station 河和口駅

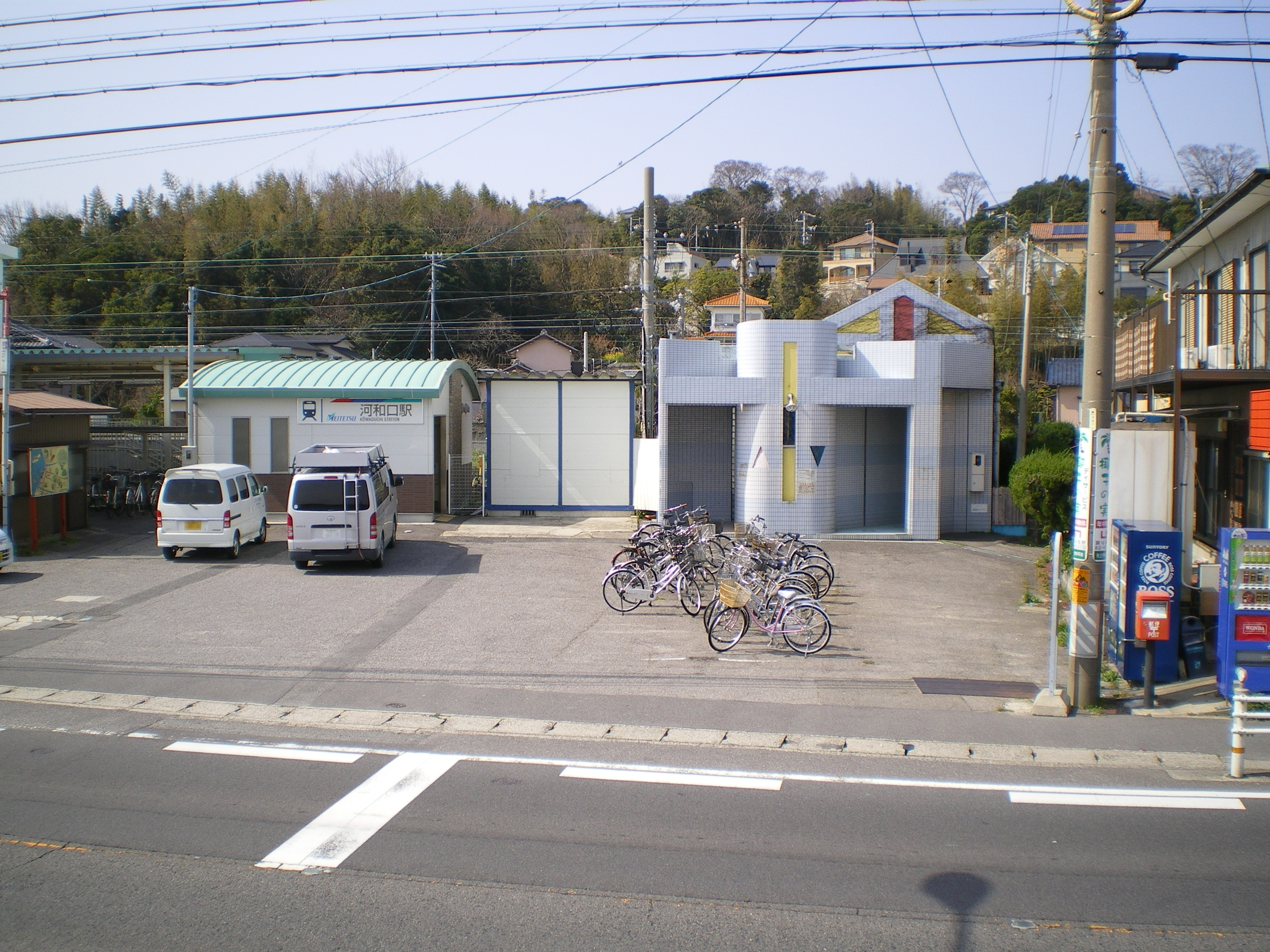
- Kōwaguchi Station building (left)

General information
- Location: Nakabirai-33 Futto, Mihama-cho, Chita-gun, Aichi-ken 470-2401; Japan
- Coordinates: 34.7976°N 136.9188°E
- Operator: Meitetsu
- Line: ■ Meitetsu Kōwa Line
- Distance: 25.8 kilometers from Ōtagawa
- Platforms: 2 side platforms

Other information
- Status: Unstaffed
- Station code: KC18
- Website: Official website

History
- Opened: July 1, 1932

Passengers
- FY2018: 306
Location
- Location within Aichi Prefecture Location within Japan

Kōwaguchi Station (河和口駅, Kōwaguchi-eki) is a train station in the town of Mihama, Chita District, Aichi Prefecture, Japan, operated by Meitetsu.

== Lines ==
Kōwaguchi Station is served by the Meitetsu Kōwa Line, and is located 25.8 kilometers from the starting point of the line at Ōtagawa.

== Station layout ==
Track diagram of Kōwaguchi and Kōwa Station

The station has two opposed side platforms. The platforms are short, and can handle trains of only six carriages or less. The station has automated ticket machines, Manaca automated turnstiles and is unattended..

=== Platforms ===
1	■ Meitetsu Kōwa Line	For Kōwa
2	■ Meitetsu Kōwa Line	For Ōtagawa, Meitetsu Nagoya

== Adjacent stations ==
←	Service	→
Meitetsu Kōwa Line
Fuki	Limited Express	Kōwa
Fuki	Rapid Express	Kōwa
Fuki	Express	Kōwa
Fuki	Semi Express	Kōwa
Fuki	Local	Kōwa

== Station history ==
Kōwaguchi Station was opened on July 1, 1932 as a station on the Chita Railway. The Chita Railway became part of the Meitetsu group on February 2, 1943. In 2007, the Tranpass system of magnetic fare cards with automatic turnstiles was implemented.

== Passenger statistics ==
In fiscal 2018, the station was used by an average of 306 passengers daily.

== Surrounding area ==
- Kawawaguchi Shioshiri Hunting Ground

== See also ==
- List of railway stations in Japan
