= Yawata-shinden Station =

Railway station in Tōkai, Aichi Prefecture, Japan

Yawata-shinden Station 八幡新田駅

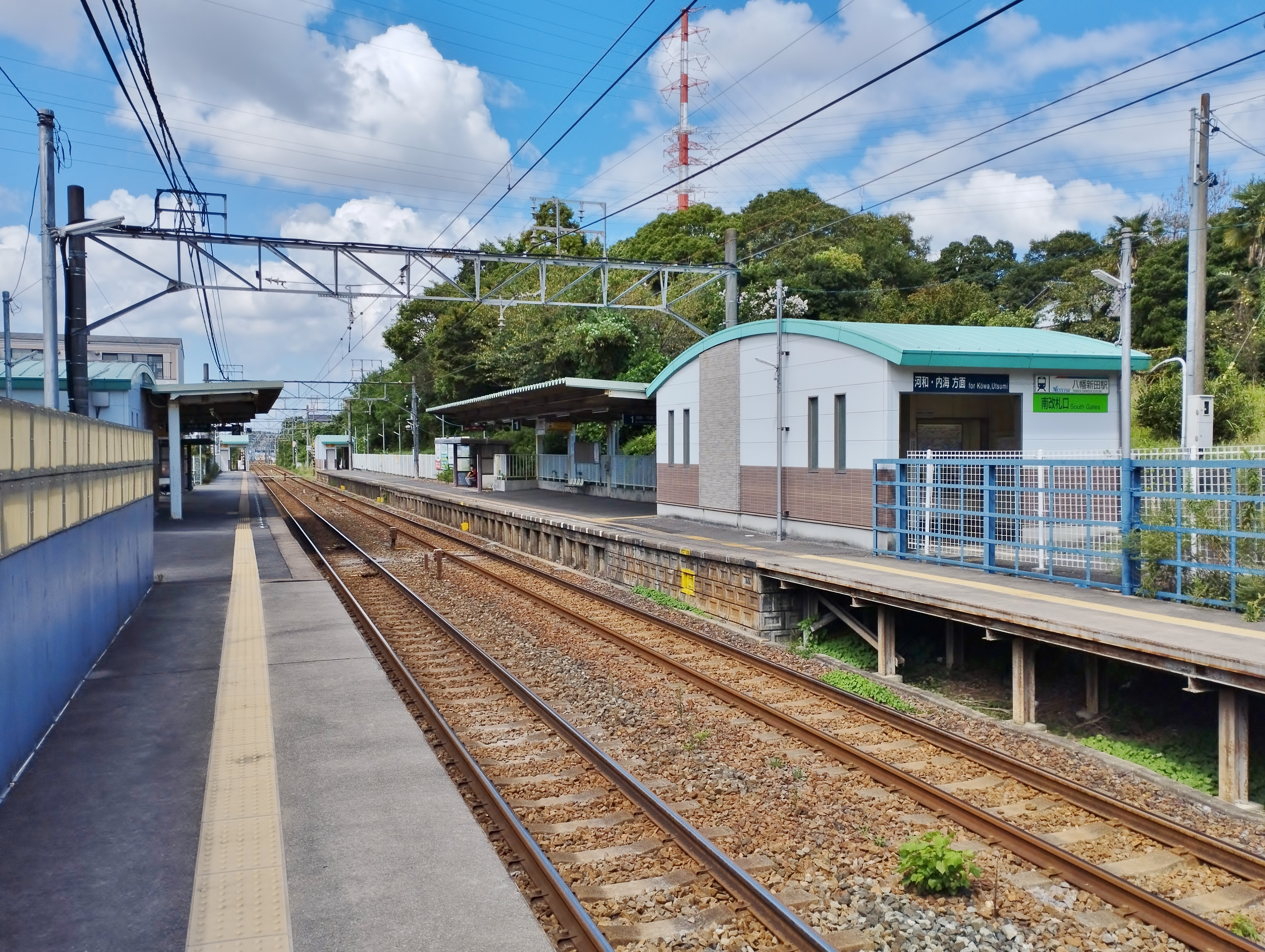
- Yawata-shinden Station in September 2023

General information
- Location: Dadabōshi-43 Kagiyamachi, Tokai-shi, Aichi-ken 477-0032; Japan
- Coordinates: 34.9738°N 136.9124°E
- Operator: Meitetsu
- Line: Kōwa Line
- Distance: 5.9 kilometers from Ōtagawa
- Platforms: 2 side platforms

Other information
- Status: Unstaffed
- Station code: KC04
- Website: Official website

History
- Opened: April 1, 1931

Passengers
- FY2017: 2486 daily

Services
Preceding station	Meitetsu	Following station
Tatsumigaoka towards Kōwa	Kōwa Line Local	Minami Kagiya towards Ōtagawa
Location
- Location within Aichi Prefecture Location within Japan

Yawata-shinden Station (八幡新田駅, Yawata-shinden-eki) is a railway station in the city of Tōkai, Aichi Prefecture, Japan, operated by Meitetsu.

== Lines ==
Yawata-shinden Station is served by the Meitetsu Kōwa Line, and is located 5.9 kilometers from the starting point of the line at Ōtagawa.

== Station layout ==
The station has two opposed side platforms connected by a level crossing. The platforms are short, and can handle trains of only six carriages or less. The station has automated ticket machines, Manaca automated turnstiles and is unattended.

=== Platforms ===
1	■ Meitetsu Kōwa Line	For Chita Handa, Kōwa, and Utsumi
2	■ Meitetsu Kōwa Line	For Ōtagawa and Kanayama

== Station history ==
Yawata-shinden Station was opened on April 1, 1931 as a station on the Chita Railway. The Chita Railway became part of the Meitetsu group on February 2, 1943. The station has been unattended since 1950. In March 2007, a new station building was completed, and the Tranpass system of magnetic fare cards with automatic turnstiles was implemented.

== Passenger statistics ==
In fiscal 2017, the station was used by an average of 2486 passengers daily.

== Surrounding area ==
- Narawa Junior High School
- Narawa Elementary School

== See also ==
- List of railway stations in Japan
