= Meitetsu Kōwa Line =

Railway line in Aichi Prefecture, Japan

Kōwa Line

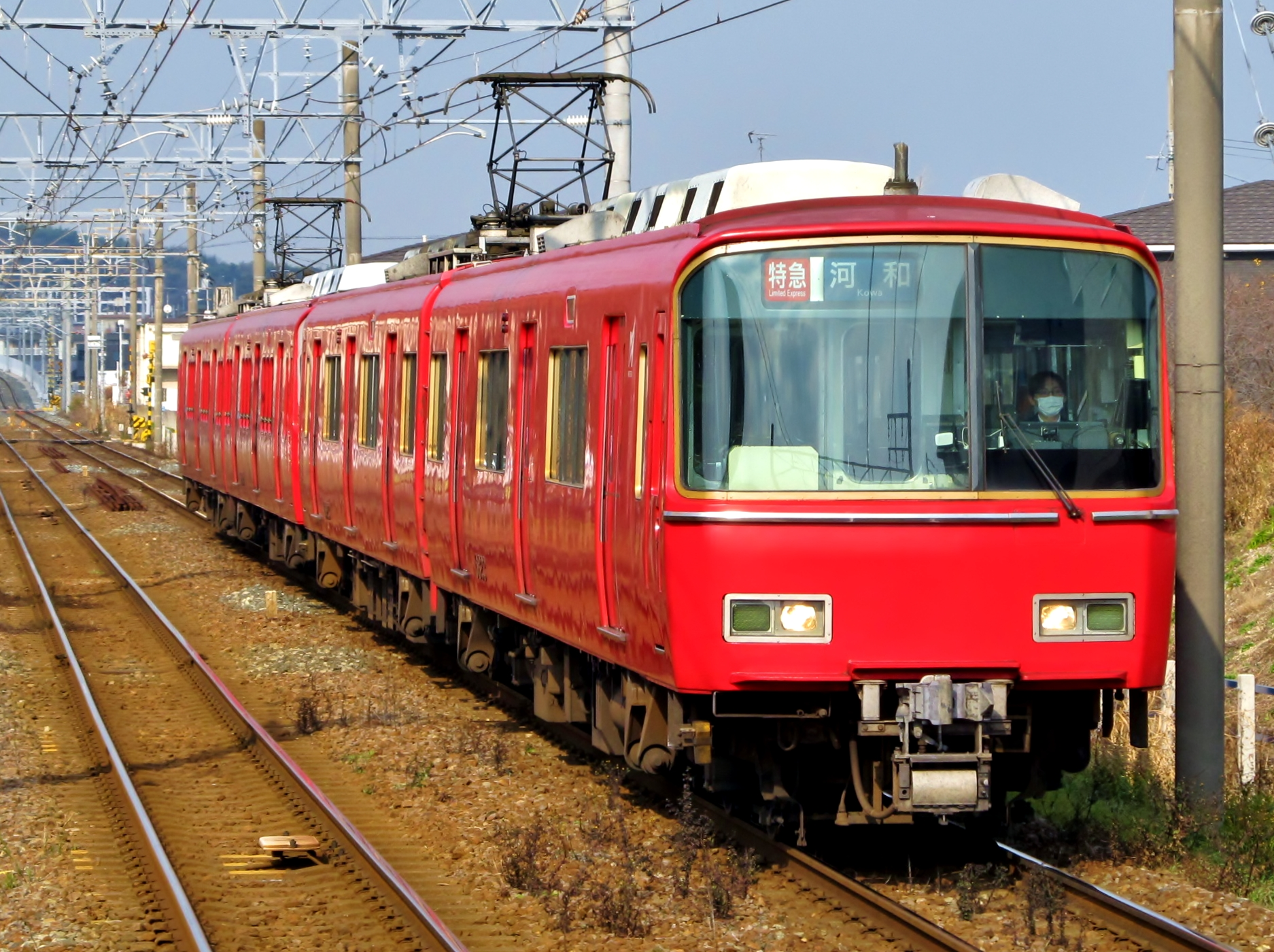
- A Meitetsu 6800 series Limited Express service bound for Kōwa Station

Overview
- Native name: 河和線
- Status: In service
- Owner: Meitetsu
- Line number: KC
- Locale: Chita Peninsula, Aichi
- Termini: Ōtagawa; Kōwa
- Stations: 20

Service
- Type: Commuter rail
- System: Meitetsu
- Operator: Meitetsu
- Rolling stock: Reference: List: Meitetsu 2000 series; Meitetsu 2200 series; Meitetsu 1700 series; Meitetsu 1200 series; Meitetsu 1800 series; Meitetsu 3500 series; Meitetsu 3700 series; Meitetsu 3100 series; Meitetsu 3300 series; Meitetsu 3150 series; Meitetsu 3300 series; Meitetsu 4000 series; Meitetsu 5700 series; Meitetsu 6000 series; Meitetsu 6500 series; Meitetsu 6800 series; Meitetsu 5000 series; Meitetsu 9500 series

History
- Opened: April 1, 1931; 95 years ago

Technical
- Line length: 28.8 km (17.9 mi)
- Number of tracks: 2 (Ōtagawa - Kōwaguchi); 1 (Kōwaguchi - Kōwa)
- Track gauge: 1,067 mm (3 ft 6 in)
- Electrification: 1,500 V DC, overhead catenary
- Operating speed: 100 km/h (62 mph)

The Kōwa Line (河和線, Kōwa-sen) is a Japanese railway line connecting Tōkai with Mihama within Aichi Prefecture. It is owned and operated by Meitetsu.

The line was built and originally operated by the Chita Railways, which opened the line in 1931. It was completed upon its extension to Kōwa in 1935. After the company merged into Meitetsu in 1943, several infill stations were opened, while stations with low usage were merged or closed.

The line is served by five different types of services. Most trains provide through service to Kanayama Station via Tokoname Line. Meitetsu Limited Express services to Nagoya Station depart from Kōwa every 30 minutes.

== History ==
=== Before Meitetsu ownership ===
In the Taishō era, the only railway line connecting eastern Chita peninsula and Nagoya was the Taketoyo Line, which was inconvenient at the time due to its low number of trains. Following petitions from local residents, Aichi Electric Railways gained approval in December 1912 to build a railway line from Owari Yokosuka Station to Handa. However, the approval expired at the end of 1915 without the construction even beginning due to the economic depression at the time affecting the company. In 1924, several influential people in the Handa and Kōwa regions planned to establish a company named Chita Electric Railways. The group of people requested technical help from Aichi Electric Railways, and approval to construct a railway line from Ōtagawa Station to Kōwa was gained in 1926. The company was renamed to Chita Railways in 1927, with Kiyonari Aikawa as the first CEO. The construction for the section between Ōtagawa and Narawa Station began in December 1929. The construction was able to continue despite the Wall Street crash of 1929 thanks to financial and technical aid from the Aichi Electric Railways.

Chita Railway opened the 15.8 km Ōtagawa – Narawa section for passenger services, electrified at 1500 V DC, in 1931. The 10.0 km section between Narawa and Kōwaguchi Station opened in 1932. Sumiyoshichō Station, Aoyama Station, and Urashima Station opened in 1933. The 3.0 km extension to Kōwa Station opened in August 1935 due to delays in land acquirement. The company merged into Meitetsu on February 1, 1943, with all trains, infrastructure and employees transferred to Meitetsu. The line was initially named Chita Line from 1943, although the name changed to the current name in 1948.

=== Under Meitetsu ownership ===
Tatsumigaoka Station was opened on July 10, 1955. In 1969, Kagiya Station between Takayokosuka and Minami Kagiya, Urashima Station between Chita Taketoyo and Fuki, and Tokishi Station between Kōwaguchi and Kōwa, which had all been suspended during World War II, were abolished. In 1972, Shikainami Station was merged into Futto Station and was abolished. The section from Ōtagawa to Kōwaguchi was gradually duplicated from 1960 to 1974. Agui Station was opened on July 21, 1983. Futto Station and Mukuoka Station were closed on December 16, 2006, due to low ridership. Kagiya-nakanoike Station was built between Takayokosuka and Minami Kagiya, and opened from the start of the revised timetable implemented on 16 March 2024.

== Network and operations ==
=== Services ===
Prior to the March 2023 timetable revision, many trains provided through service to Utsumi Station via the Chita New Line, which was reduced after March 2023. Five different types of service are operated on the line. Most trains provide through service to Kanayama Station via the Tokoname Line. Meitetsu Limited Express services to Nagoya Station depart from Kōwa every 30 minutes. Rapid Express trains are limited to the morning of weekdays, one bound for Kōwa Station and two in the direction of Ōtagawa Station.

No.	Name	Local	Semi Express	Express	Rapid Express	Limited Express
TA09	Ōtagawa	●	●	●	●	●
KC01	Takayokosuka	●	｜	｜	｜	｜
KC02	Kagiya-Nakanoike	●	｜	｜	｜	｜
KC03	Minami Kagiya	●	●	●	●	｜
KC04	Yawata-shinden	●	｜	｜	｜	｜
KC05	Tatsumigaoka	●	●	●	●	｜
KC06	Shirasawa	●	｜	｜	｜	｜
KC07	Sakabe	●	｜	｜	｜	｜
KC08	Agui	●	●	●	●	●
KC09	Uedai	●	｜	｜	｜	｜
KC10	Handaguchi	●	｜	｜	｜	｜
KC11	Sumiyoshichō	●	●	●	●	｜
KC12	Chita Handa	●	●	●	●	●
KC13	Narawa	●	●	●	●	｜
KC14	Aoyama	●	●	●	●	●
KC15	Age	●	●	●	●	｜
KC16	Chita Taketoyo	●	●	●	●	●
KC17	Fuki	●	●	●	●	●
KC18	Kōwaguchi	●	●	●	●	●
KC19	Kōwa	●	●	●	●	●

=== Operators ===
The line is currently operated by Meitetsu, although it was operated by Chita Railways with the help of Aichi Electric Railways before it merged to form Meitetsu.

=== Route ===
Meitetsu Kōwa Line branches off Ōtagawa Station to head southeast, running west of Taketoyo Line from Chitahanda to Chita-Taketoyo. The line continues south of the Chita peninsula. Meitetsu Chita New Line branches off southwest into Utsumi Station from Fuki Station. Most of the line is double-tracked, although the section between Kōwaguchi and Kōwa is single-tracked.

== Infrastructure ==
=== Stations ===
The line serves 20 stations (19 excluding Ōtagawa) across the length of the line. Several stations on the line have been upgraded to feature ramps, lifts, and elevators due to requests from passing municipalities.

No.	Name	Japanese	Between (km)	Distance (km)	Connections	Location
TA09	Ōtagawa	太田川	-	0.0	Tokoname Line (TA09)	Tōkai
KC01	Takayokosuka	高横須賀	1.3	1.3		Tōkai
KC02	Kagiya-Nakanoike	加木屋中ノ池	1.4	2.7		Tōkai
KC03	Minami Kagiya	南加木屋	1.4	4.1		Tōkai
KC04	Yawata-shinden	八幡新田	1.8	5.9		Tōkai
KC05	Tatsumigaoka	巽ヶ丘	1.2	7.1		Chita
KC06	Shirasawa	白沢	0.8	7.9		Agui, Chita District
KC07	Sakabe	坂部	1.6	9.5		Agui, Chita District
KC08	Agui	阿久比	1.1	10.6		Agui, Chita District
KC09	Uedai	植大	1.6	12.2		Agui, Chita District
KC10	Handaguchi	半田口	1.0	13.2		Handa
KC11	Sumiyoshichō	住吉町	0.8	14.0		Handa
KC12	Chita Handa	知多半田	0.8	14.8	Taketoyo Line (Handa: CE07)	Handa
KC13	Narawa	成岩	1.0	15.8		Handa
KC14	Aoyama	青山	1.0	16.8	Taketoyo Line (Higashi-Narawa: CE08)	Handa
KC15	Age	上ゲ	2.2	19.0		Taketoyo, Chita District
KC16	Chita Taketoyo	知多武豊	0.8	19.8	Taketoyo Line (Taketoyo: CE09)	Taketoyo, Chita District
KC17	Fuki	富貴	2.5	22.3	Chita New Line (KC17)	Taketoyo, Chita District
KC18	Kōwaguchi	河和口	3.5	25.8		Mihama, Chita District
KC19	Kōwa	河和	3.0	28.8		Mihama, Chita District
