= Kagiya-nakanoike Station =

Railway station in Tōkai, Aichi Prefecture, Japan

Kagiya-nakanoike Station 加木屋中ノ池駅

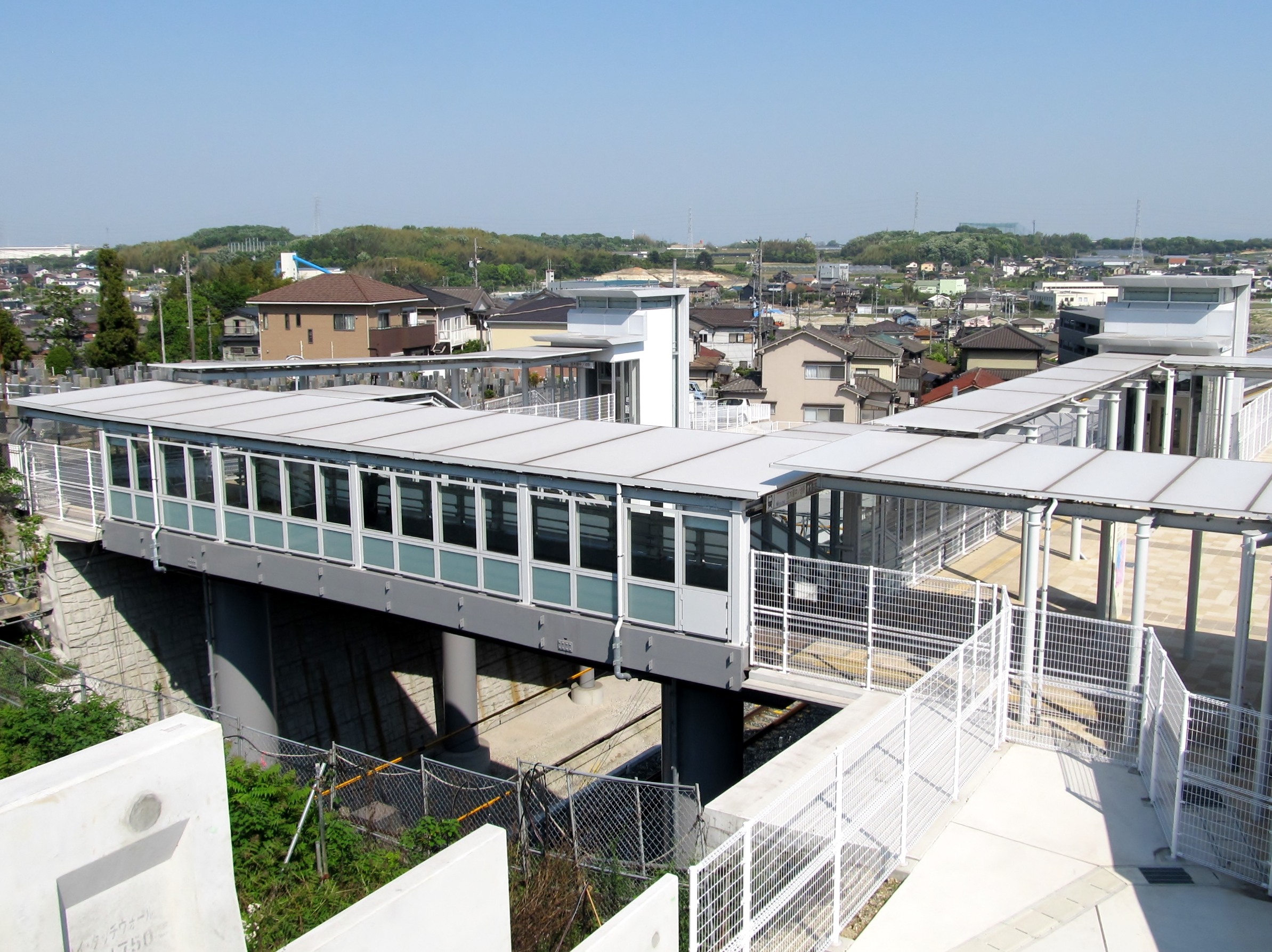
- North Exit of Kagiya-nakanoike Station in April 2025

General information
- Other names: Nishi-Chita Hospital Station (加木屋中ノ池駅, Kōritsu Nishi-Chita sōgō Byōinmae-eki)
- Location: 46-2 Karabatake, Kagiya-machi, Tokai-shi, Aichi-ken; Japan
- Coordinates: 35°0′0″N 136°54′9.3″E
- Operator: Meitetsu
- Line: Kōwa Line
- Platforms: 2 side platforms

Construction
- Structure type: Below-grade
- Accessible: Yes

Other information
- Status: Staffed
- Station code: KC02
- Website: Official website

History
- Opened: 16 March 2024

Services
Preceding station	Meitetsu	Following station
Minami Kagiya towards Kōwa	Kōwa Line Local	Takayokosuka towards Ōtagawa
Location
- Location within Aichi Prefecture Location within Japan

Kagiya-nakanoike Station (加木屋中ノ池駅, Kagiya-nakanoike-eki) is a railway station in the city of Tōkai, Aichi Prefecture, Japan, operated by Meitetsu.

== Lines ==
Kagiya-nakanoike Station is served by the Meitetsu Kōwa Line, and is located 1.4 kilometers in either direction from the neighbouring stations at Takayokosuka and Minami-Kagiya.

== Station layout ==
The station has two opposed side platforms connected by a footbridge. The station has automated ticket machines, Manaca automated turnstiles and is staffed.

== Station history ==
In 2015, Meitetsu and Aichi Prefecture agreed to construct a new station on the Kowa Line between Takayokosuka and Minami Kagiya in anticipation of the opening of the Nishi-Chita General Hospital.

The name of the station, Kagiya-nakanoike Station, was finalized on 22 December 2022. A secondary name, Nishi-Chita Hospital Station (加木屋中ノ池駅, Kōritsu Nishi-Chita sōgō Byōinmae-eki), was added at the request of the city of Tokai.

The station opened on 16 March 2024 as finalized on 1 September 2023. Initially, at the time of the station's opening, only the north exit became operational. The south exit will only be opened at a later date.

== See also ==
- List of railway stations in Japan
