= Agui, Aichi =

Agui 阿久比町
- Town
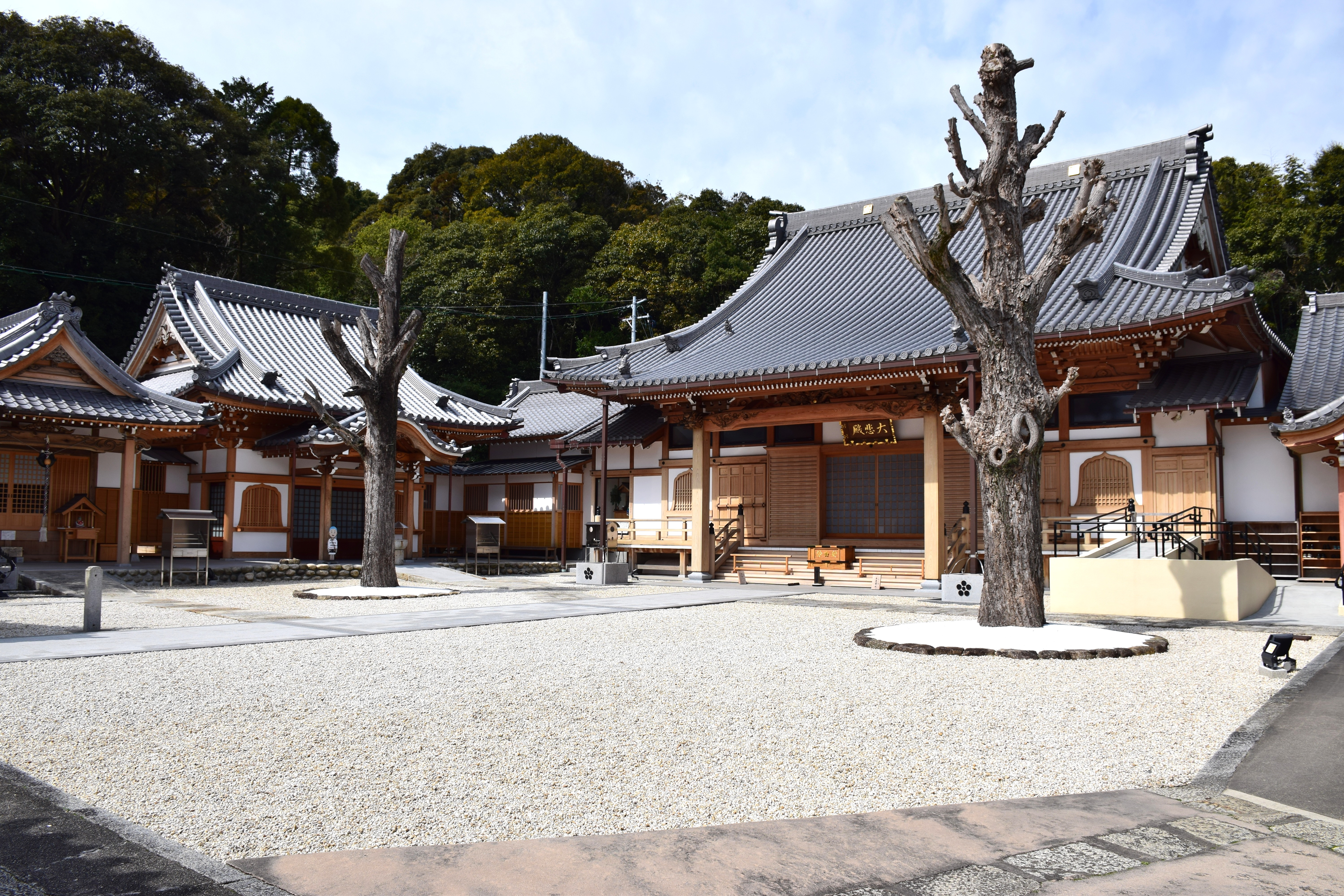
- Tōun-in

- Flag Emblem

- Location of Agui in Aichi Prefecture

- Coordinates: 34°56′N 136°55′E
- Country: Japan
- Region: Chūbu region Tōkai region
- Prefecture: Aichi
- District: Chita

Area
  - Total: 23.80 km^{2} (9.19 sq mi)

Population (October 1, 2019)
  - Total: 28,291
  - Density: 1,189/km^{2} (3,079/sq mi)
- Time zone: UTC+9 (Japan Standard Time)
- Tree: Ilex integra
- Flower: Prunus mume
- Phone number: 0569-48-1111
- Address: Agui-chō, Chita-gun, Aichi-ken 470-2292
- Website: Official website

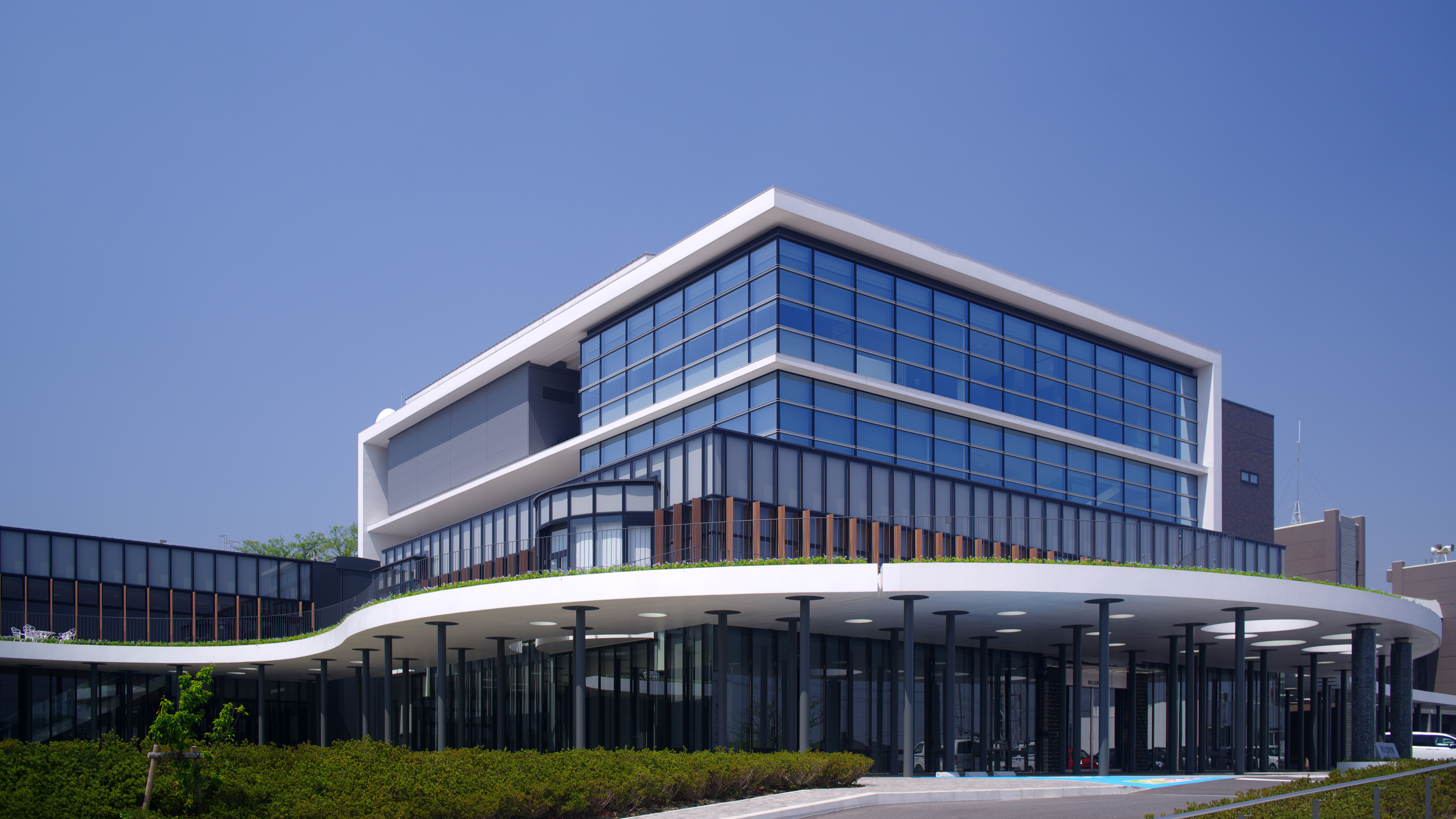
Agui town hall

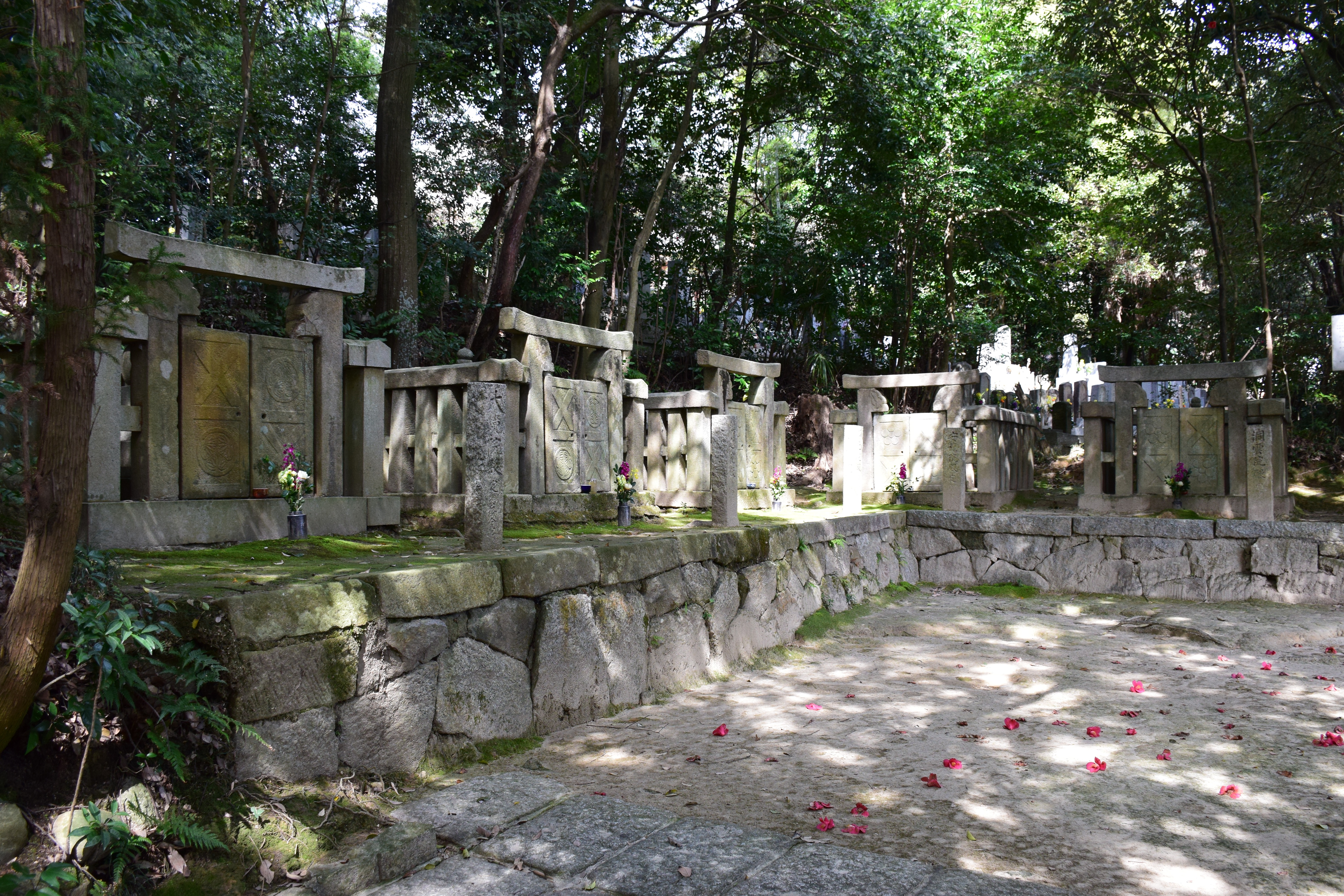
Tomb of Hisamatsu clan, Tōun-in

Agui (阿久比町, Agui-chō) is a town located in Chita District, Aichi Prefecture, Japan. As of 1 October 2019, the town had an estimated population of 28,291 in 10,682 households and a population density of 1,189/km^{2} (3,080/sq mi). The total area of the town was 23.80 square kilometres (9.19 sq mi).

== Geography ==
Agui is located in an inland area of northwestern Chita Peninsula in southern Aichi Prefecture. It is located approximately 30 minutes by car or express train from downtown Nagoya. The highest elevation is 74.7 meters above sea level.

=== Neighboring municipalities ===
Aichi Prefecture

- Chita
- Handa
- Higashiura
- Tokoname

== Demographics ==
Per Japanese census data, the population of Agui has been relatively steady over the past 50 years.

Historical population
Year	Pop.	±%
1940	8,591	—
1950	12,061	+40.4%
1960	12,918	+7.1%
1970	18,499	+43.2%
1980	20,880	+12.9%
1990	23,932	+14.6%
2000	24,029	+0.4%
2010	25,460	+6.0%
2020	28,383	+11.5%

=== Climate ===
The town has a climate characterized by hot and humid summers, and relatively mild winters (Köppen climate classification Cfa). The average annual temperature in Agui is 15.5 °C.

== History ==
The name of Agui is very ancient, and appears in Asuka and Nara period records. During the Muromachi period, the area was the territory of the Hisamatsu clan, and later came under the control of Oda Nobunaga. The village of Agui was founded in October 1889 with the establishment of the modern municipality system, and became a town on January 1, 1953.

There was a failed attempt to merge with Handa located in the south of Agui due to lack of votes in the referendum on December 26, 2004. As a result, no merges occurred in the 10 municipalities in Chita utilizing the Chubu Centrair International Airport.

== Economy ==
Agui is largely an agricultural center, and is bedroom community for the city of Nagoya.

== Education ==
Agui has four public elementary schools and one public junior high school operated by the town government, and one public high school operated by the Aichi Prefectural Board of Education. The Institute of Sports Medicine and Science is located in Agui.

== Transportation ==
=== Railway ===
Meitetsu – Kōwa Line

- Shirasawa - Sakabe - Agui - Uedai

=== Highway ===
- Chitahantō Road

Agui is not served by any national roads.

== Local attractions ==
- Agui Baseball Stadium
- Sakabe Castle ruins, ancestral home of the Hisamatsu clan
- Tōun-in, Buddhist temple, bodaiji for the mother of Tokugawa Ieyasu
