= Tranpass =

Former magnetic fare card in Nagoya, Japan

Tranpass (トランパス, Toranpasu) was the name of a magnetic fare card that was able to be used with many trains and buses running in Nagoya and its suburbs, especially trains and buses operated by the Nagoya City Transportation Bureau and Meitetsu (Nagoya Railroad). The Nagoya City Municipal Subway sold magnetic fare cards called Yurica cards, and Meitetsu sold magnetic fare cards known as SF Panorama cards, but were usually Tranpass-compatible cand thus ould be used on any transportation system that accepted Tranpass cards. Starting on February 11, 2011, a contactless smart card, manaca, supplemented and eventually replaced Tranpass.

== Prevalence ==
Tranpass cards could be used in all Nagoya Municipal Subway lines, all Nagoya City buses, nearly all stations in Nagoya Railroad (Meitetsu), some buses operated by Meitetsu, all of the Aonami Line, and all of the Linimo Line. Within the Nagoya area, Tranpass was able to be used to pay for nearly any public transportation except for JR Central railway stations or Kintetsu stations, which used a different magnetic fare card system, namely TOICA, or Suica in the case of JR Central and PiTaPa in the case of Kintetsu. Unlike other magnetic fare card systems in Japan like TOICA, however, Tranpass could only be used to pay transportation fare, and could not be used in place of cash at other retail shops like convenience stores or restaurants.

== Means of use ==
The cards were sold at ticket machines near station gates, and generally contained more money for fare than the price of the card in Japanese yen. For example, a card costing 5,000 yen would pay for 5,600 yen's worth of fare. Prices ranged from under 1,000 yen for cards from Nagoya Subway to cards costing 5,000 yen.

The card could not be used to enter a gate when the balance ran below the minimum price of a ticket, yet cash could not be added to a card. To use up the remaining fare on those cards, tickets could be bought with cards and cash in combination, or a new card could be bought with the old card's balance rolled over onto the balance of the new card. For example, a card with 100 yen left may have been used to pay for a new card costing 5,000 yen, resulting in a card with 5,700 yen's worth of fare. When buying cards from the subway system, the maximum balance on an old card to do this procedure was 310 yen and for cards bought from Nagoya Railroad (Meitetsu), it was a 690 yen balance when buying cards costing 2,000 yen or 3,000 yen, and a 1,500 yen balance when buying cards costing 5,000 yen.

== Phaseout ==
The magnetic fare card known as Manaca replaced Tranpass cards and Tranpass were phased out. On February 11, 2011, sales of the Manaca magnetic fare card began, and sales of Tranpass cards, including Yurica and SF Panorama cards, ceased after the departure of the final train at the end of that day. Tranpass cards were able to be used after that day, until February 29, 2012 which was the last day the card could be used.
