= Nagoya Meitoku Junior College =

Private junior college in Japan

- 名古屋明徳短期大学
- Type: Private women's junior college
- Active: 1989–2003
- Location: Tōkai, Aichi, Japan

Nagoya Meitoku Junior College (名古屋明徳短期大学, Nagoya Meitoku Tanki Daigaku) was a private junior college in the city of Tōkai in Aichi Prefecture, Japan.

== History ==
Nagoya Meitoku Junior College opened in 1989. It closed in 2003.

== Courses offered ==
- English studies
- International culture

== See also ==
- List of junior colleges in Japan
