= Shin Nittetsu-mae Station =

Railway station in Tōkai, Aichi Prefecture, Japan

Shin Nittetsu-mae Station 新日鉄前駅

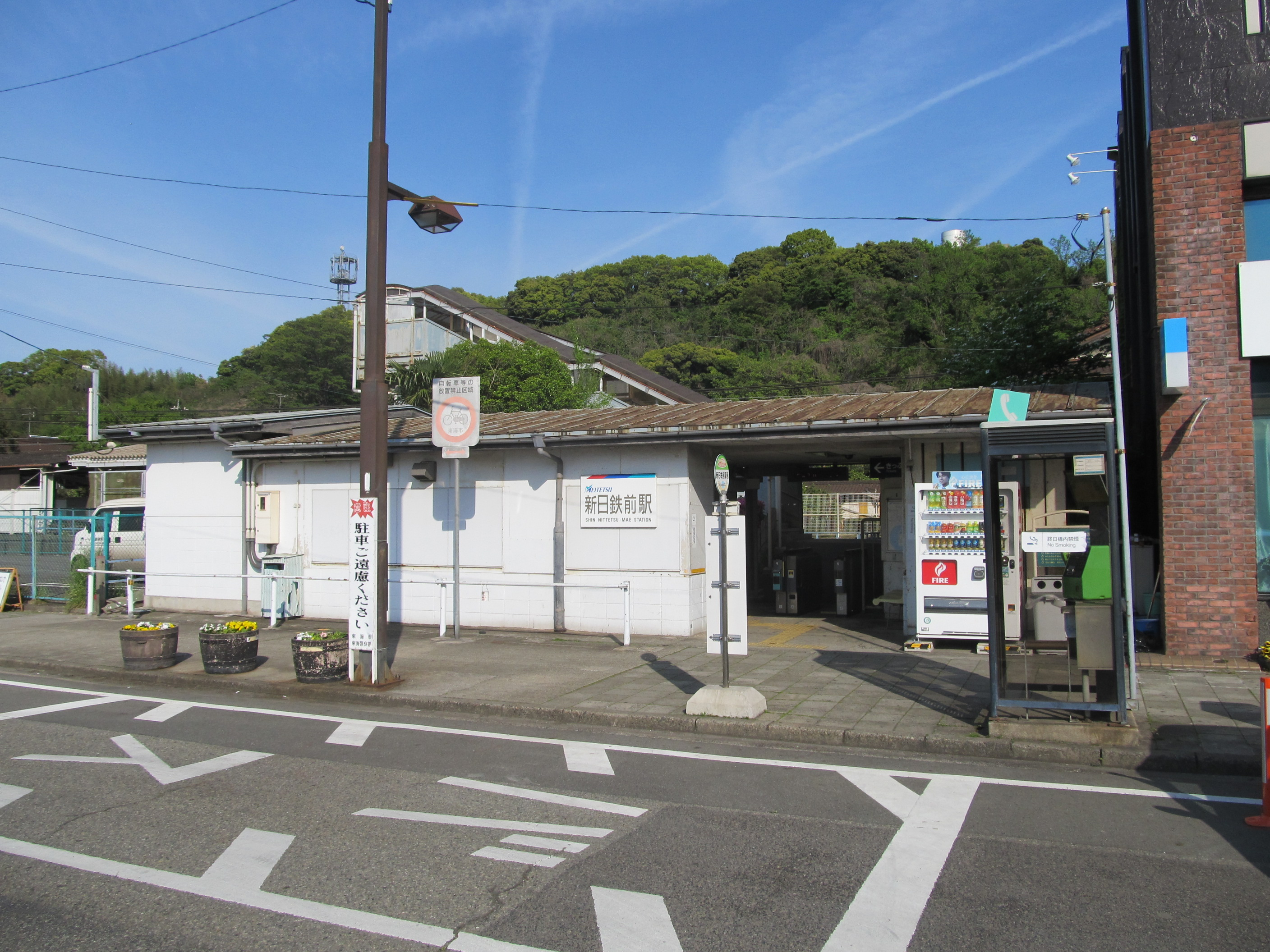
- Shin Nittetsu-mae Station, April 2004

General information
- Location: 2-6-4 Tōkaimachi, Tokai-shi, Aichi-ken 476-0015; Japan
- Coordinates: 35.0353°N 136.8993°E
- Operator: Meitetsu
- Line: ■ Meitetsu Tokoname Line
- Distance: 10.6 kilometers from Jingū-mae
- Platforms: 2 side platforms

Other information
- Status: Unstaffed
- Station code: TA08
- Website: Official website

History
- Opened: February 18, 1912
- Closed: 1944-1964
- Former names: Kake (to 1944); Tōkaiseitetsu (1964-1967); Fujiseitetsu (1967-1970)

Passengers
- FY2017: 1889 daily

Services
Preceding station	Meitetsu	Following station
Otagawa towards Tokoname	Tokoname Line Local	Shurakuen towards Jingū-mae
Location
- Location within Aichi Prefecture Location within Japan

Shin Nittetsu-mae Station (新日鉄前駅, Shin Nittetu-mae-eki) is a railway station in the city of Tōkai, Aichi Prefecture, Japan, operated by Meitetsu.

== Lines ==
Shin Nittetsu-mae Station is served by the Meitetsu Tokoname Line, and is located 10.6 kilometers from the starting point of the line at Jingū-mae.

== Station layout ==
The station has two opposed side platforms connected by a footbridge. The station has automated ticket machines, Manaca automated turnstiles and is unattended.

=== Platforms ===
1	■ Tokoname Line	For Ōtagawa, Tokoname, Central Japan International Airport and Chita Handa
2	■ Tokoname Line	For Jingū-mae and Nagoya

== Station history ==
Shin Nittetu-mae Station was opened on February 18, 1912 as Kake Station (加家駅, Kake-eki) on the Aichi Electric Railway Company. The Aichi Electric Railway became part of the Meitetsu group on August 1, 1935; however, the station was closed in 1944. On August 17, 1964, the station was reopened as Tōkaiseitetsu-mae Station (東海製鉄前駅, Tōkaiseitetsu-mae eki) after the nearby Tōkai Steel plant. The station named changed to Fujiseitetsu-mae Station (富士製鉄前駅, Fujiseitetsu-mae eki) when Tōkai was absorbed into Fuji Steel on August 1, 1967, and then to its present name on March 31, 1970 when Fuji co-founded Nippon Steel. The station has been unattended since March 2002. In January 2005, the Tranpass system of magnetic fare cards with automatic turnstiles was implemented.

== Passenger statistics ==
In fiscal 2017, the station was used by an average of 1889 passengers daily.

== Surrounding area ==
This station provides access to Seijoh University, although the name comes from the nearby Nippon Steel plant.

== See also ==
- List of railway stations in Japan
