= Owari Yokosuka Station =

Railway station in Tōkai, Aichi Prefecture, Japan

Owari Yokosuka Station 尾張横須賀駅

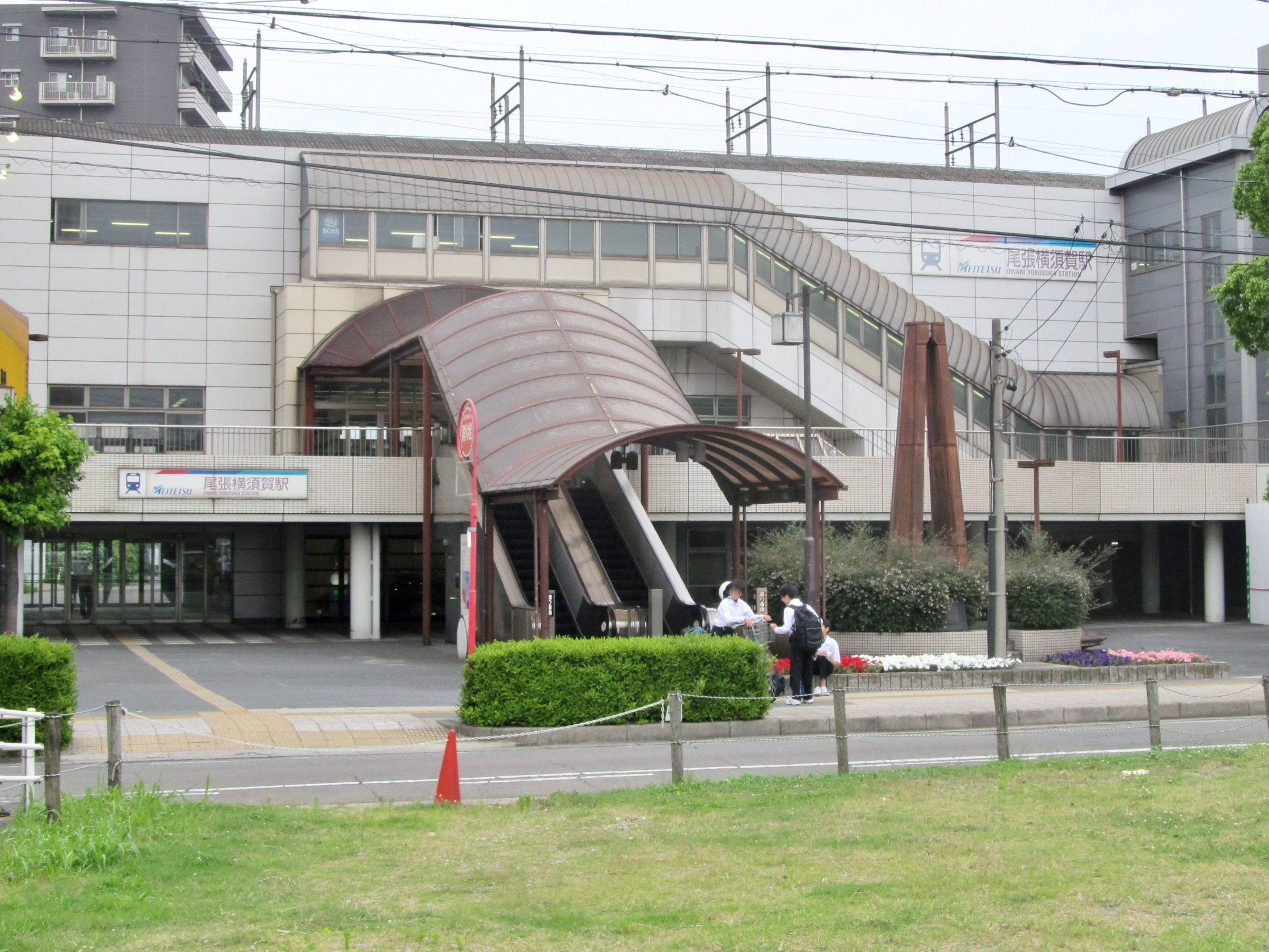
- Owari Yokosuka Station, June 2018

General information
- Location: Kitatanda-13-2 Yabumachi Tokai-shi, Aichi-ken 477-0034; Japan
- Coordinates: 35.0103°N 136.8859°E
- Operator: Meitetsu
- Line: ■ Meitetsu Tokoname Line
- Distance: 13.7 kilometers from Jingū-mae
- Platforms: 2 side platforms

Other information
- Status: Staffed
- Station code: TA10
- Website: Official website

History
- Opened: February 18, 1912

Passengers
- FY2017: 5472 daily
Location
- Location within Aichi Prefecture Location within Japan

Owari Yokosuka Station (尾張横須賀駅, Owari Yokosuka-eki) is a railway station in the city of Tōkai, Aichi Prefecture, Japan, operated by Meitetsu.

== Lines ==
Owari Yokosuka Station is served by the Meitetsu Tokoname Line, and is located 13.7 kilometers from the starting point of the line at Jingū-mae.

== Station layout ==
The station has two opposed side platforms, with the station building underneath. The station has automated ticket machines, Manaca automated turnstiles and is staffed.

=== Platforms ===
1	■ Tokoname Line	For Tokoname and Central Japan International Airport
2	■ Tokoname Line	For Ōtagawa and Jingū-mae

== Adjacent stations ==
←	Service	→
Meitetsu Tokoname Line
Ōtagawa	μSKY Limited Express (departing from Central Japan Int'l Airport before 9 a.m.)	Asakura
Ōtagawa	Limited Express	Asakura
Ōtagawa	Rapid Express	Asakura
Ōtagawa	Express	Teramoto
Ōtagawa	Semi-Express	Teramoto
Ōtagawa	Local	Teramoto

== Station history ==
Owari Yokosuka Station was opened on February 18, 1912 as a station on the Aichi Electric Railway Company. The Aichi Electric Railway became part of the Meitetsu group on August 1, 1935. The station was relocated to its present address in March 1990, and work to elevate the tracks was completed in November 2002.

== Passenger statistics ==
In fiscal 2017, the station was used by an average of 5472 passengers daily.

== Surrounding area ==
- Seijoh University.

== See also ==
- List of railway stations in Japan
