= Hinaga Station =

Hinaga Station is the name of two train stations in Japan:

- Hinaga Station (Aichi) (日長駅)
- Hinaga Station (Mie) (日永駅)
