= Nagaura Station (Aichi) =

Railway station in Chita, Aichi Prefecture, Japan

Nagaura Station 長浦駅

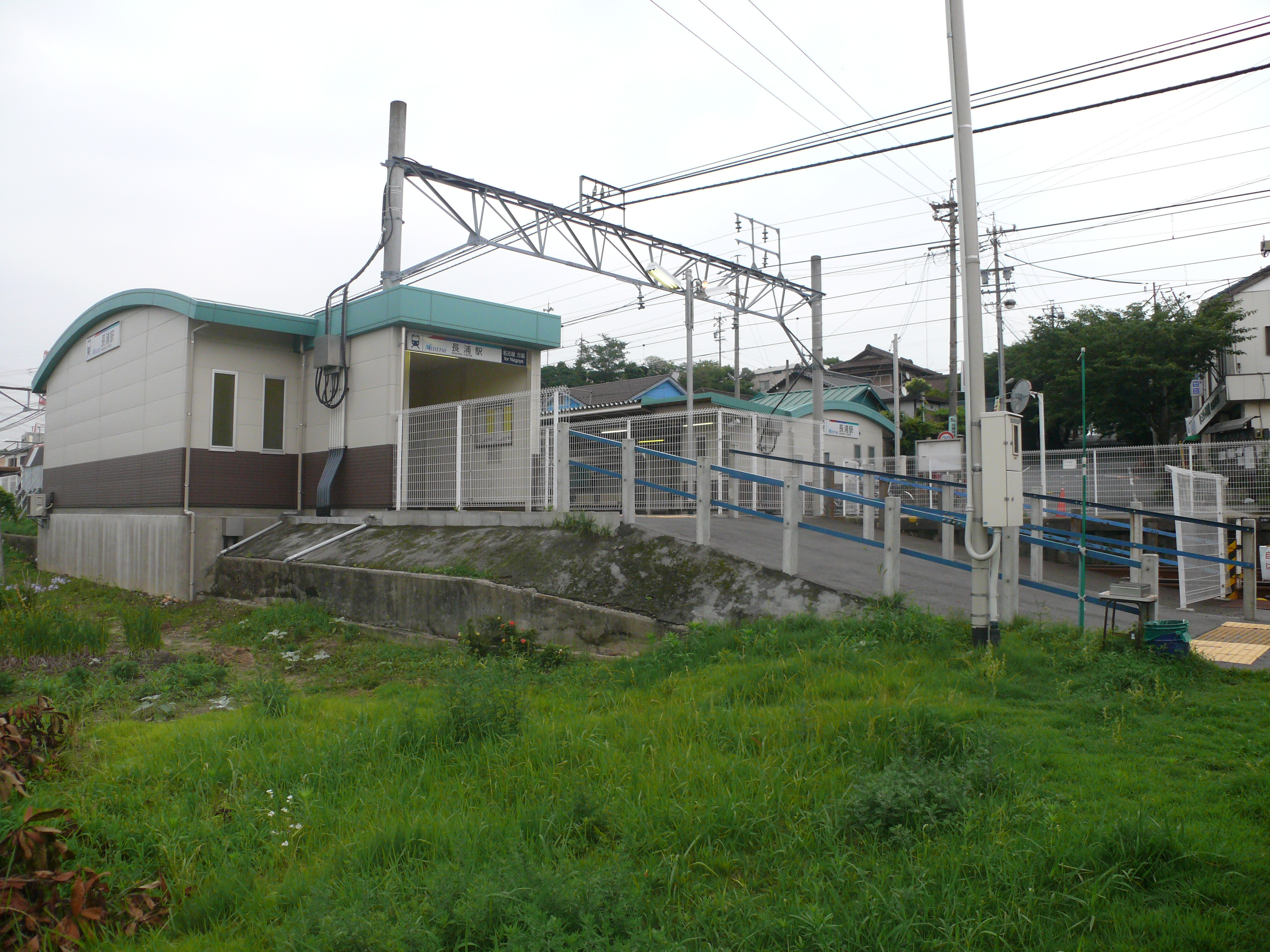
- Meitetsu Nagaura in July 2007

General information
- Location: Nagaura 1-400, Chita-shi, Aichi-ken 478-0042; Japan
- Coordinates: 34.9783°N 136.848°E
- Operator: Meitetsu
- Line: ■ Meitetsu Tokoname Line
- Distance: 17.8 kilometers from Jingū-mae
- Platforms: 2 side platforms

Other information
- Status: Unstaffed
- Station code: TA14
- Website: Official website

History
- Opened: September 1, 1930

Passengers
- FY2017: 1005 daily

Services
Preceding station	Meitetsu	Following station
Hinaga towards Tokoname	Tokoname Line Local	Komi towards Jingū-mae
Location
- Location within Aichi Prefecture Location within Japan

Nagaura Station (長浦駅, Nagaura-eki) is a railway station in the city of Chita, Aichi, Japan, operated by Meitetsu.

== Lines ==
Nagaura Station is served by the Meitetsu Tokoname Line, and is located 17.8 kilometers from the starting point of the line at Jingū-mae.

== Station layout ==
The station has dual opposed side platforms connected by a level crossing. The station is unattended.

=== Platforms ===
1	■ Tokoname Line	For Tokoname and Central Japan International Airport
2	■ Tokoname Line	For Ōtagawa and Jingū-mae

== Station history ==
Nagaura Station was opened on September 1, 1930, as a station on the Aichi Electric Railway Company. The Aichi Electric Railway became part of the Meitetsu group on August 1, 1935. The station has been unattended since September 1970. In January 2005, the Tranpass system of magnetic fare cards with automatic turnstiles was implemented, and the station has been unattended since that point.

== Passenger statistics ==
In fiscal 2017, the station was used by an average of 1,005 passengers daily (boarding passengers only).

== Surrounding area ==
- The station is located in a residential area.

== See also ==
- List of railway stations in Japan
