= Shin Maiko Station =

Railway station in Chita, Aichi Prefecture, Japan

Shin Maiko Station 新舞子駅

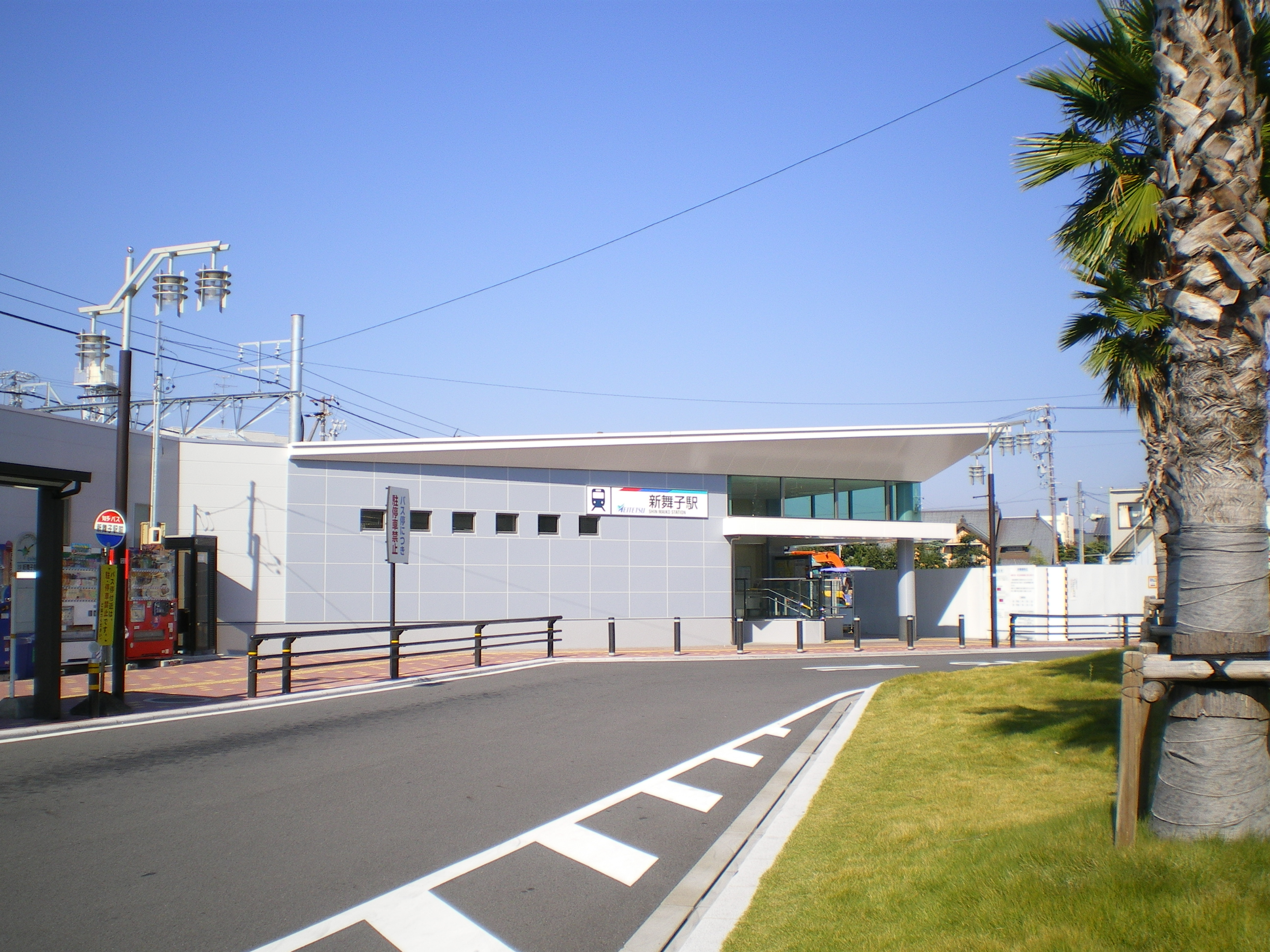
- Shin Maiko Station in November 2010

General information
- Location: Ōse-55-1 Shinmaiko, Chita-shi, Aichi-ken 478-0036; Japan
- Coordinates: 34.9495°N 136.8286°E
- Operator: Meitetsu
- Line: ■ Meitetsu Tokoname Line
- Distance: 22.5 kilometers from Jingū-mae
- Platforms: 2 side platforms

Other information
- Status: Staffed
- Station code: TA16
- Website: Official website

History
- Opened: February 18, 1912

Passengers
- FY2017: 6080 daily
Location
- Location within Aichi Prefecture Location within Japan

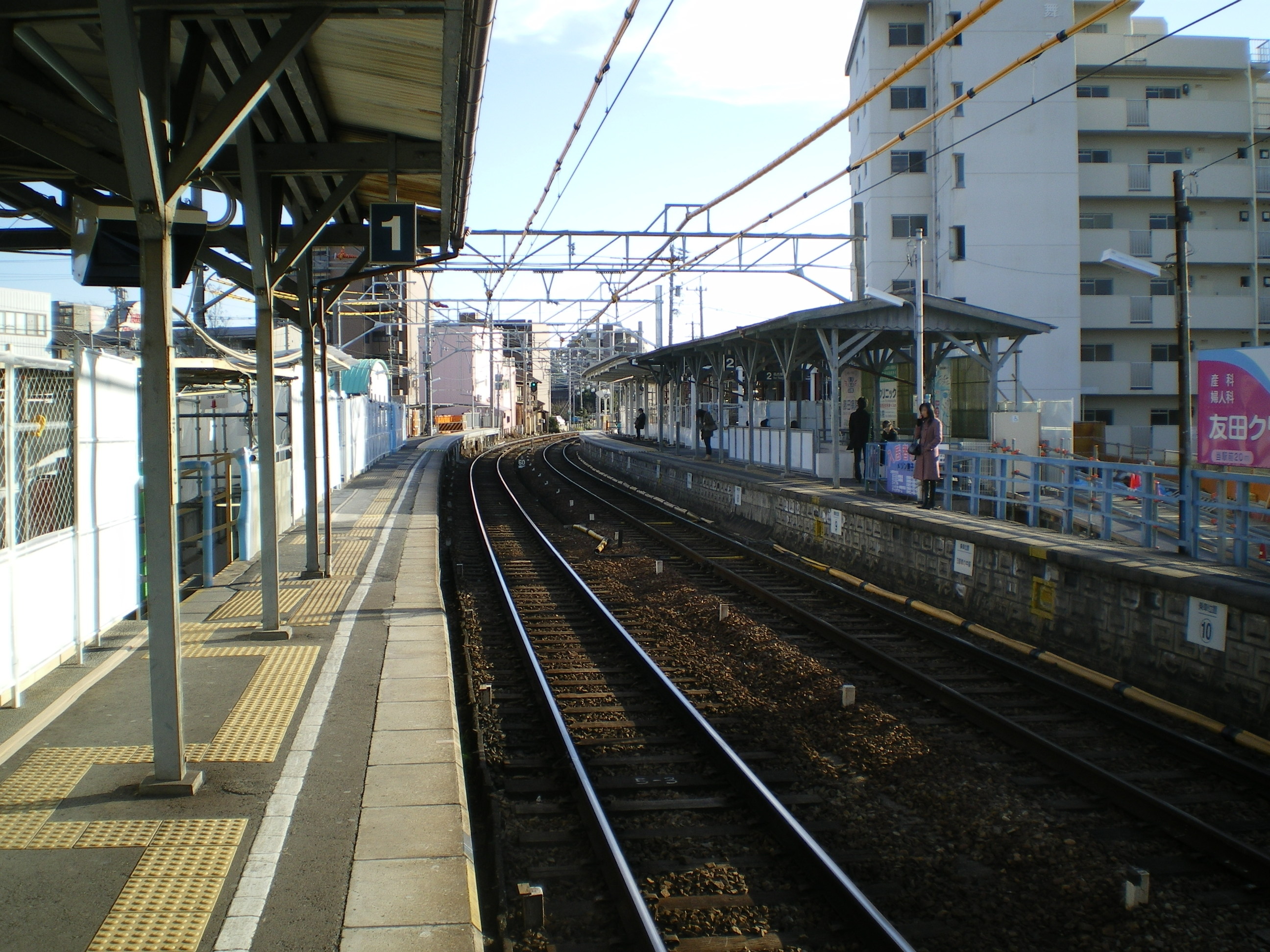
Platforms

Shin Maiko Station (新舞子駅, Shin Maiko-eki) is a railway station in the city of Chita, Aichi, Japan, operated by Meitetsu.

== Lines ==
'Shin Maiko Station is served by the Meitetsu Tokoname Line, and is located 22.5 kilometers from the starting point of the line at Jingū-mae.

== Station layout ==
The station has dual opposed side platforms connected by an underground passage. The station is staffed.

=== Platforms ===
1	■ Tokoname Line	For Tokoname and Central Japan International Airport
2	■ Tokoname Line	For Ōtagawa and Jingū-mae

== Adjacent stations ==
←	Service	→
Meitetsu Tokoname Line
Asakura	μSKY Limited Express (departing from Central Japan Int'l Airport before 9 a.m.)	Tokoname
Asakura	Limited Express	Tokoname
Asakura	Rapid Express	Tokoname
Komi	Express	Ōnomachi
Komi	Semi-Express	Ōnomachi
Hinaga	Local	Ōnomachi

== Station history ==
Shin Maiko Station was opened on February 18, 1912 as a station on the Aichi Electric Railway Company. The Aichi Electric Railway became part of the Meitetsu group on August 1, 1935. The station building was reconstructed in July 1962, and replaced in July 2010. A new station building was completed in July 2010.

== Passenger statistics ==
In fiscal 2017, the station was used by an average of 6080 passengers daily (boarding passengers only).

== Surrounding area ==
- Shinmaiko Marine Park
- Japan National Route 155

== See also ==
- List of railway stations in Japan
