= Chita, Aichi =

Chita 知多市
- City
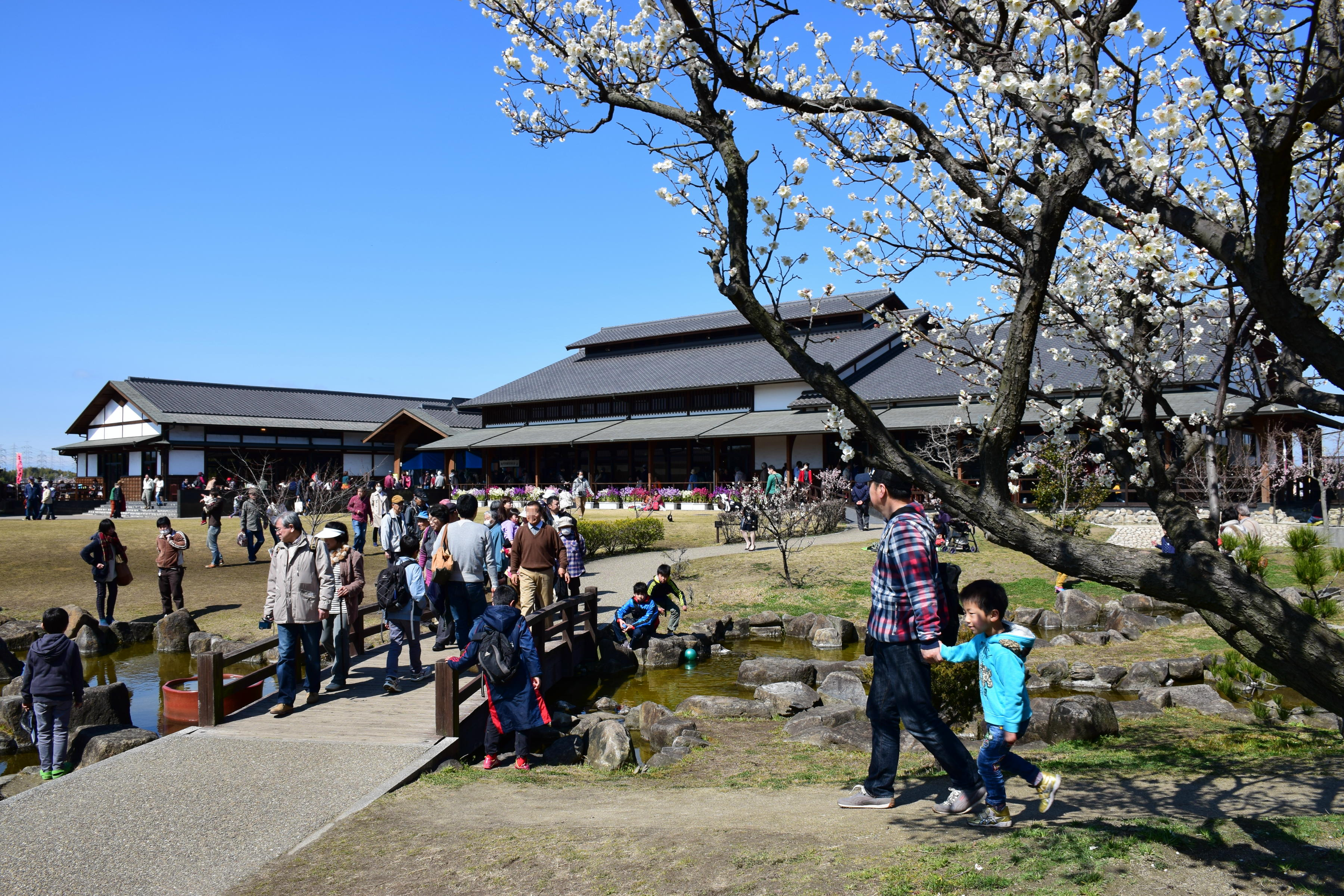
- Sori Greenery & Flora Fureai Park

- Flag Seal

- Location of Chita in Aichi Prefecture

- Coordinates: 35°00′N 136°52′E
- Country: Japan
- Region: Chūbu (Tōkai)
- Prefecture: Aichi
- Okada town settles: May 6, 1903
- Yawata Town settled: April 1, 19221
- Asahi Town settled: April 1, 1952
- Three town merged and town settled: April 1, 1955
- City settled: September 1, 1970

Government
  - Mayor: Seiichirō Itō (ja:伊藤清一郎) from October 2025

Area
  - Total: 45.90 km^{2} (17.72 sq mi)

Population (October 1, 2019)
  - Total: 83,891
  - Density: 1,828/km^{2} (4,734/sq mi)
- Time zone: UTC+9 (Japan Standard Time)
- Tree: Myrica rubra
- Flower: Azalea
- Phone number: (0562)33-3151
- Address: 1-banchi Midori-cho, Chita-shi, Aichi-ken 478-8601
- Website: Official website

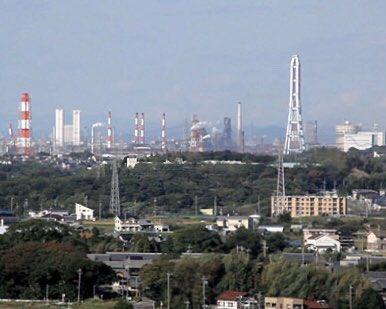
ChitaCity Skyline

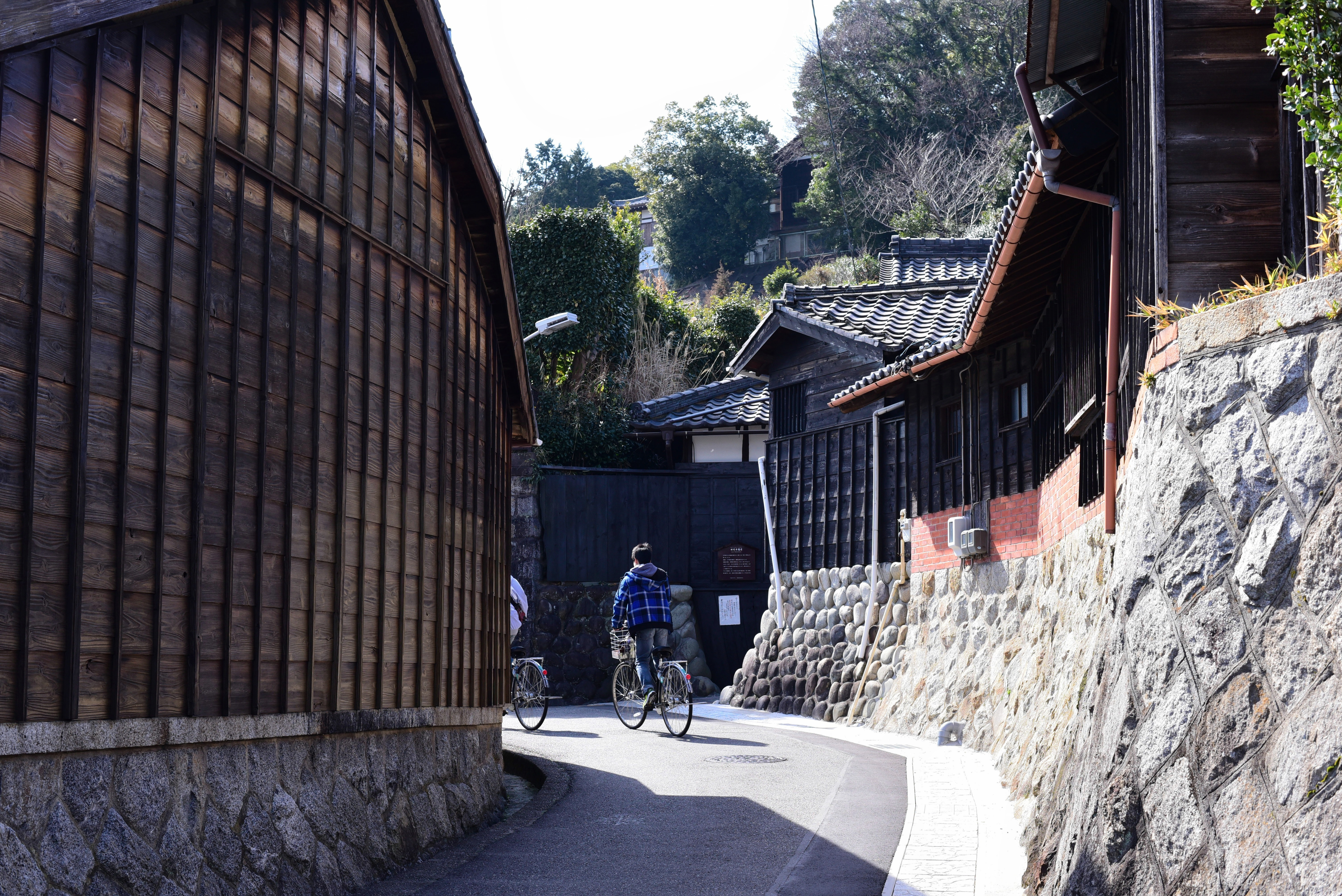
Streetscape of Okada

Chita (知多市, Chita-shi) is a city in Aichi Prefecture, Japan. As of 1 October 2019, the city had an estimated population of 83,891 in 35,798 households, and a population density of 1,828 persons per km^{2}. The total area of the city is 45.90 km^{2} (17.72 sq mi).

== Geography ==
Chita is located in northwestern Chita Peninsula in southern Aichi Prefecture, at the head of the Chita Peninsula with an altitude of 50–70 m (164.0–229.7 ft) above sea level. It is bordered by Ise Bay to the east.

=== Climate ===
The city has a climate characterized by hot and humid summers, and relatively mild winters (Köppen climate classification Cfa). The average annual temperature in Chita is 15.5 °C. The average annual rainfall is 1638 mm with September as the wettest month. The temperatures are highest on average in August, at around 27.5 °C, and lowest in January, at around 4.4 °C.

=== Demographics ===
Per Japanese census data, the population of Chita steadily grew for 70 years until 2015, when it began to decline.

Historical population
Year	Pop.	±%
1940	22,433	—
1950	29,872	+33.2%
1960	32,602	+9.1%
1970	39,834	+22.2%
1980	64,831	+62.8%
1990	75,433	+16.4%
2000	80,536	+6.8%
2010	84,757	+5.2%
2020	84,364	−0.5%

=== Neighboring municipalities ===
Aichi Prefecture

- Agui
- Higashiura
- Tōkai
- Tokoname

== History ==
=== Late modern period ===
The villages of Okada, Hinaga, Kanazawa, Yahata, Shinwa and Sori were created within Chita District, Aichi Prefecture, with the establishment of the modern municipalities system on October 1, 1889.

Okada was elevated to town status in 1903, followed by Yahata in 1922 and Asahi in 1952.

=== Contemporary history ===
The town of Chita was established on April 1, 1955, by the merger of the former towns of Okada, Asahi and Yawata.

Chita was elevated to city status on September 1, 1970.

== Government ==
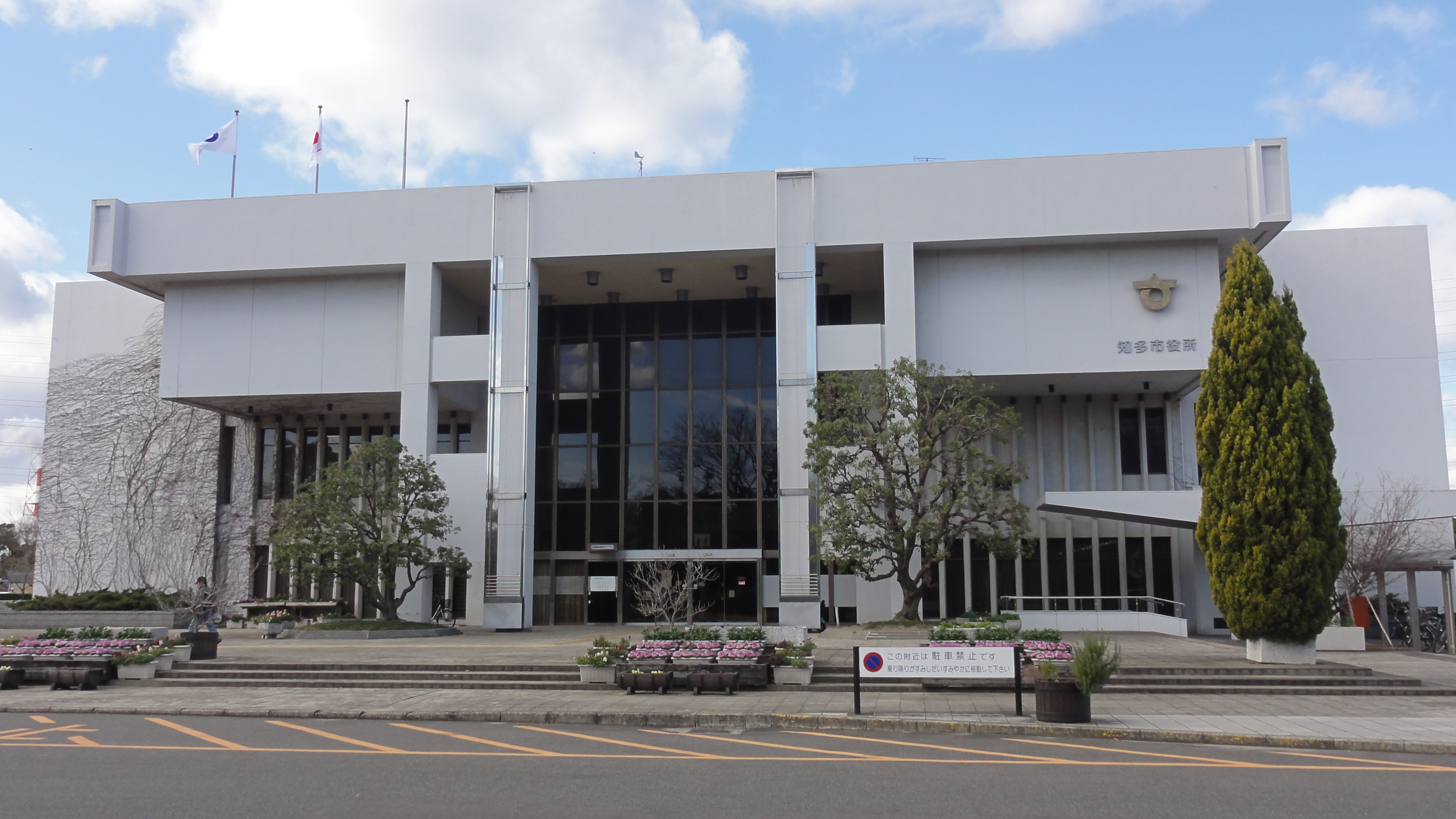
Chita City hall

Chita has a mayor-council form of government with a directly elected mayor and a unicameral city legislature of 18 members. The city contributes one member to the Aichi Prefectural Assembly. In terms of national politics, the city is part of Aichi District 8 of the lower house of the Diet of Japan.

== Economy ==
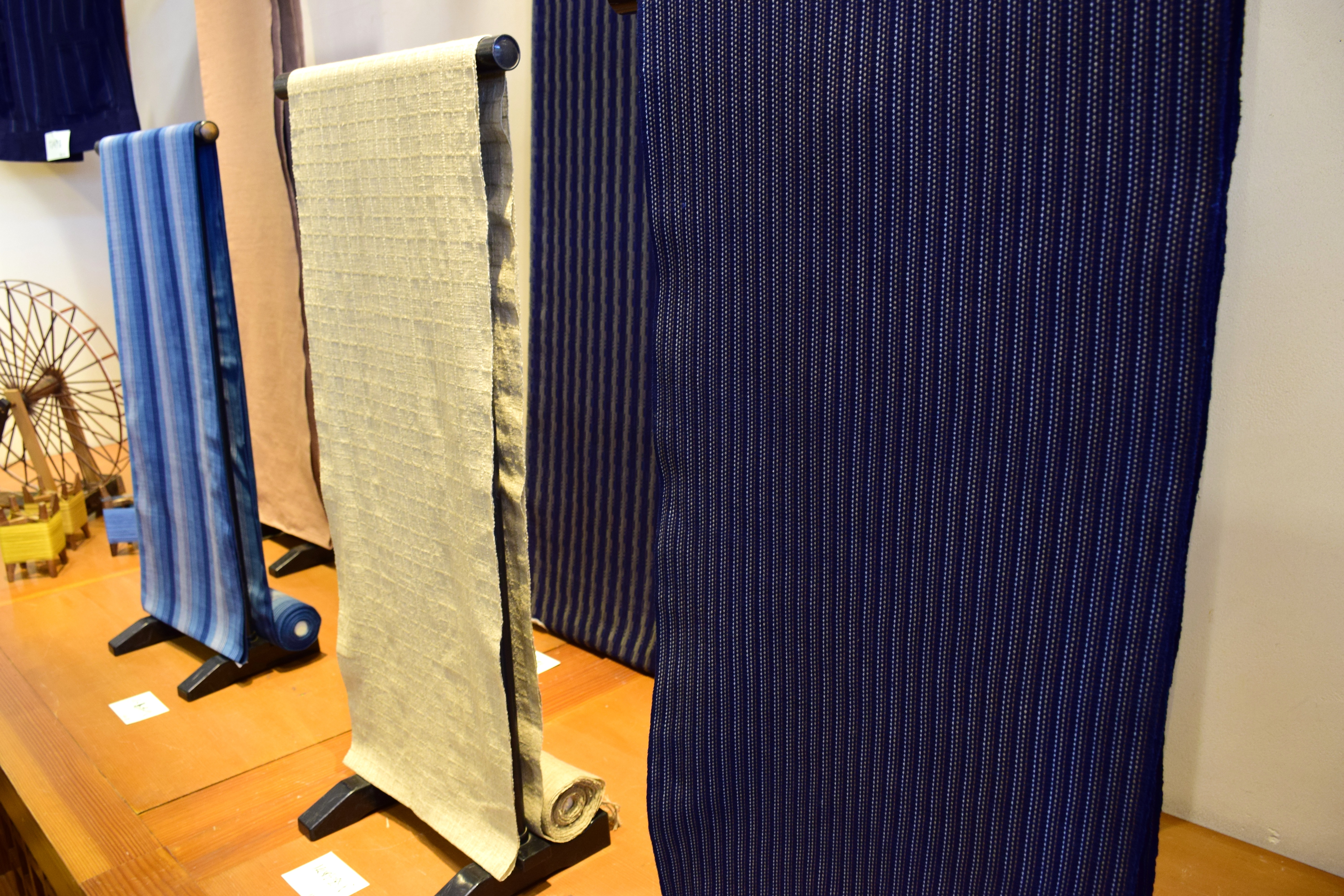
Chita cotton

Chita has a strong industrial base along its coastline, with electrical power plants, chemical and petrochemical plants and refineries predominating. The interior remains agricultural, with crops including Petasites japonicus and onions, although most agriculture is dependent on irrigation. Chubu Electric operates the large Chita Power Station in the city. Companies headquartered in Chita include:

- Chita LNG, energy
- Chubu Shiryo, fodder manufacturer
- San-ei Sucrochemical, sugar manufacturer
- Tohmei Industries, aerospace components

== Education ==
=== Schools ===
Chita has ten public elementary schools and five public junior high schools operated by the city government, and one public high school operated by the Aichi Prefectural Board of Education. There is also one private high school.

== Transportation ==
=== Railways ===
Meitetsu

- Meitetsu Tokoname Line：- Teramoto - Asakura - Komi - Nagaura - Hinaga - Shin Maiko -
- Meitetsu Kōwa Line：- Tatsumigaoka -

=== Roads ===
==== Japan National Route ====
- National Route 155
- National Route 247

== Local attractions ==
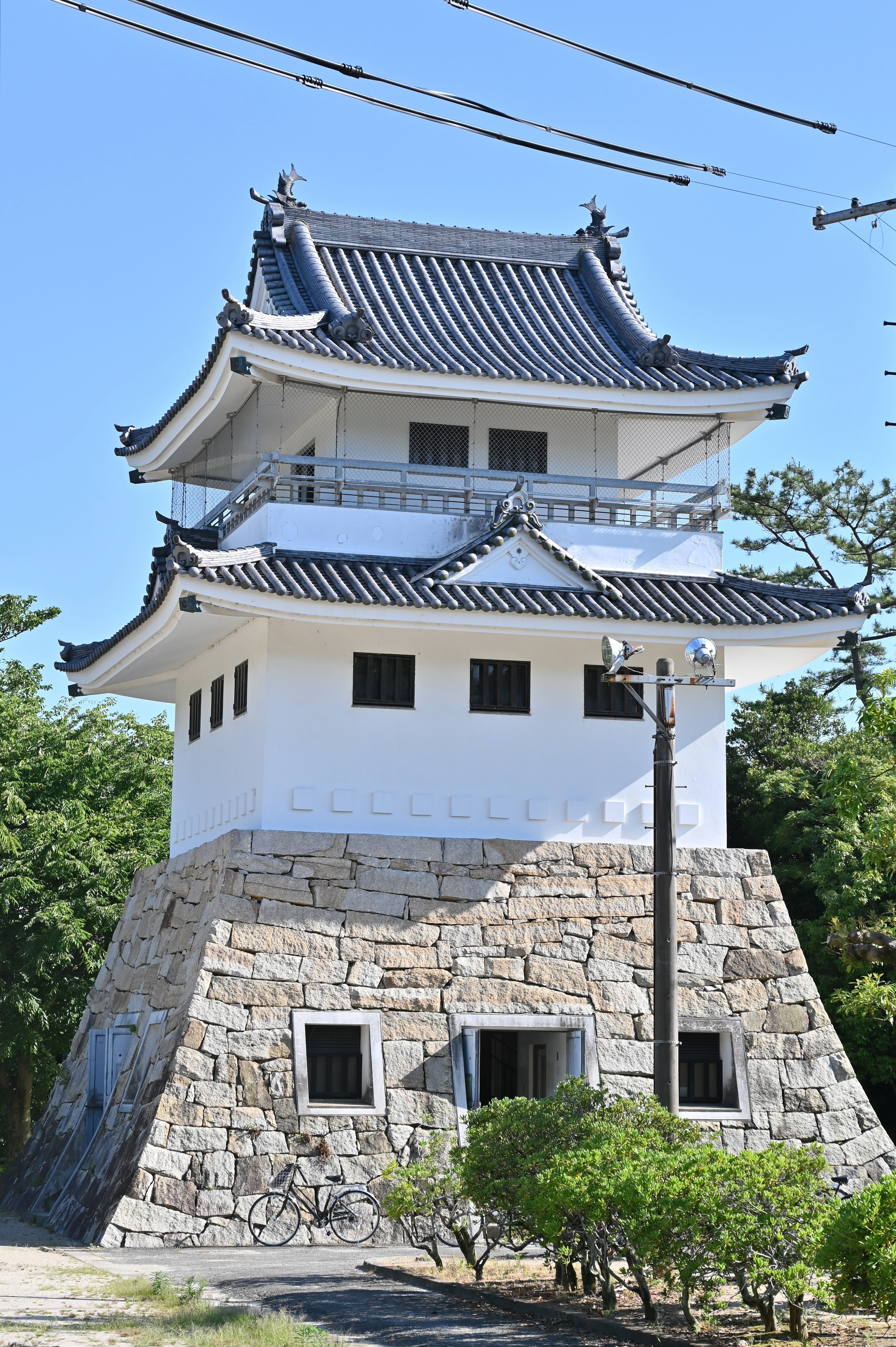
Ōkusa Castle

- Okusa Castle
- Shin Maiko Marine Park
- Sori Greenery and Fureai Park

== Notable people from Chita ==
- Takuya Asao, professional baseball player
- Koji Fukutani, professional baseball player
- Ayumi Kinoshita, actress
- Takeshi Yamasaki, professional baseball player
- Tetsuya Yamato, professional kick-boxer
