= Asakura Station (Aichi) =

Railway station in Chita, Aichi Prefecture, Japan

Asakura Station 朝倉駅

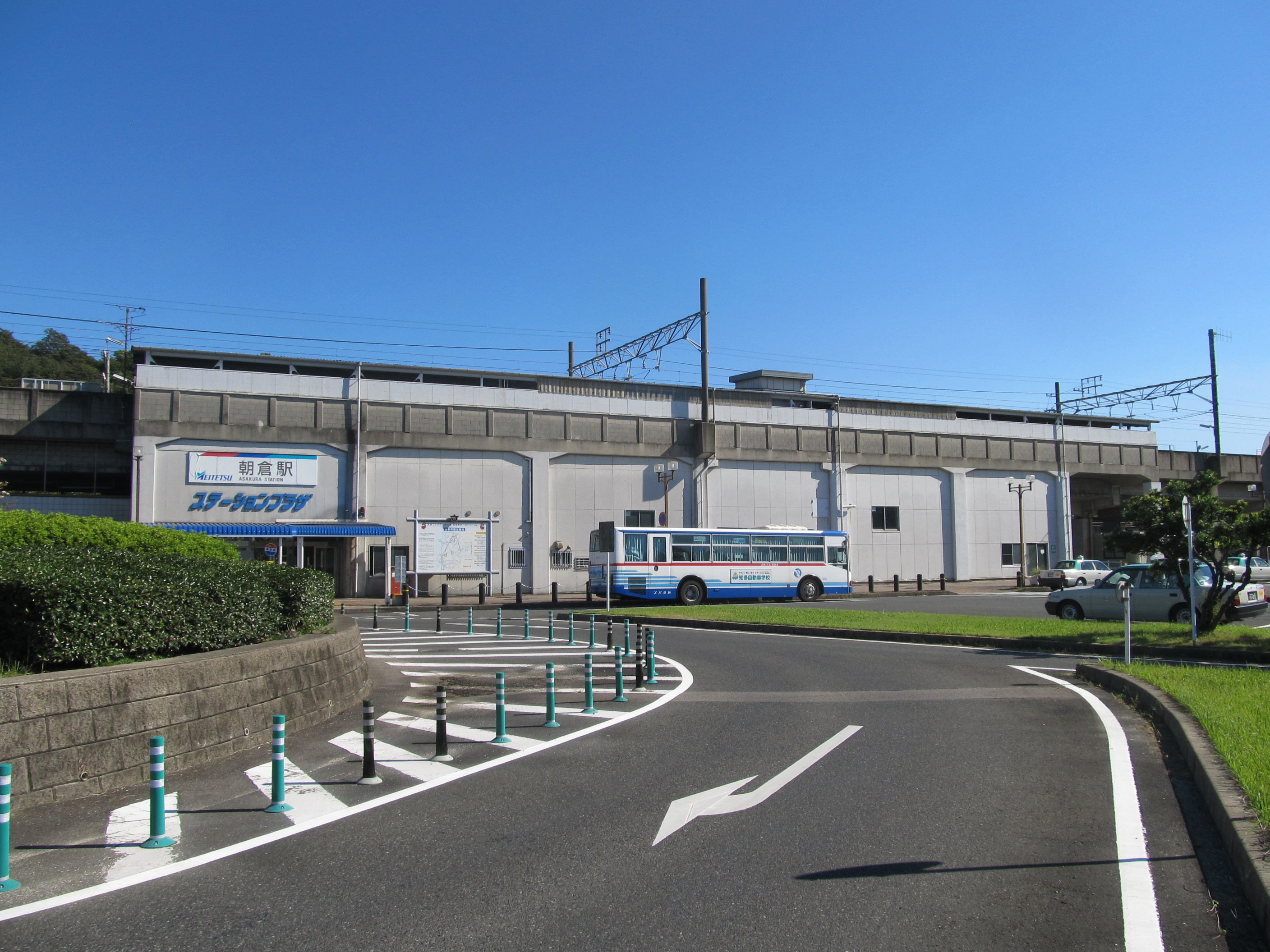
- Entrance of the elevated station

General information
- Location: Midori-cho 25-8, Chita-shi, Aichi-ken 478-0047; Japan
- Coordinates: 34.9938°N 136.863°E
- Operator: Meitetsu
- Line: ■ Meitetsu Tokoname Line
- Distance: 16.4 kilometers from Jingū-mae
- Platforms: 2 side platforms

Construction
- Structure type: Elevated

Other information
- Status: Staffed
- Station code: TA12
- Website: Official website

History
- Opened: May 9, 1923

Passengers
- FY2017: 7537 daily
Location
- Location within Aichi Prefecture Location within Japan

Asakura Station (朝倉駅, Asakura-eki) is a railway station in the city of Chita, Aichi, Japan, operated by Meitetsu.

== Lines ==
Asakura Station is served by the Meitetsu Tokoname Line, and is located 16.4 kilometers from the starting point of the line at Jingū-mae.

== Station layout ==
The station has dual opposed elevated side platforms with the station building located underneath. The station is staffed.

=== Platforms ===
1	■ Tokoname Line	For Tokoname and Central Japan International Airport
2	■ Tokoname Line	For Ōtagawa and Jingū-mae

== Adjacent stations ==
←	Service	→
Meitetsu Tokoname Line
Owari Yokosuka	μSKY Limited Express (departing from Central Japan Int'l Airport before 9 a.m.)	Shin Maiko
Owari Yokosuka	Limited Express	Shin Maiko
Owari Yokosuka	Rapid Express	Shin Maiko
Teramoto	Express	Komi
Teramoto	Semi-Express	Komi
Teramoto	Local	Komi

== Station history ==
Asakura Station was opened on May 9, 1923, as a station on the Aichi Electric Railway Company. The Aichi Electric Railway became part of the Meitetsu group on August 1, 1935. The station building was reconstructed in March 1982, when the tracks were elevated. The station has been unattended since December 2004. In January 2005, the Tranpass system of magnetic fare cards with automatic turnstiles was implemented, and the station has been unattended since that point.

== Passenger statistics ==
In fiscal 2017, the station was used by an average of 7,537 passengers daily (boarding passengers only).

== Surrounding area ==
- Chita City Hall

== See also ==
- List of railway stations in Japan
