= Komi Station (Aichi) =

Railway station in Chita, Aichi Prefecture, Japan

Komi Station 古見駅

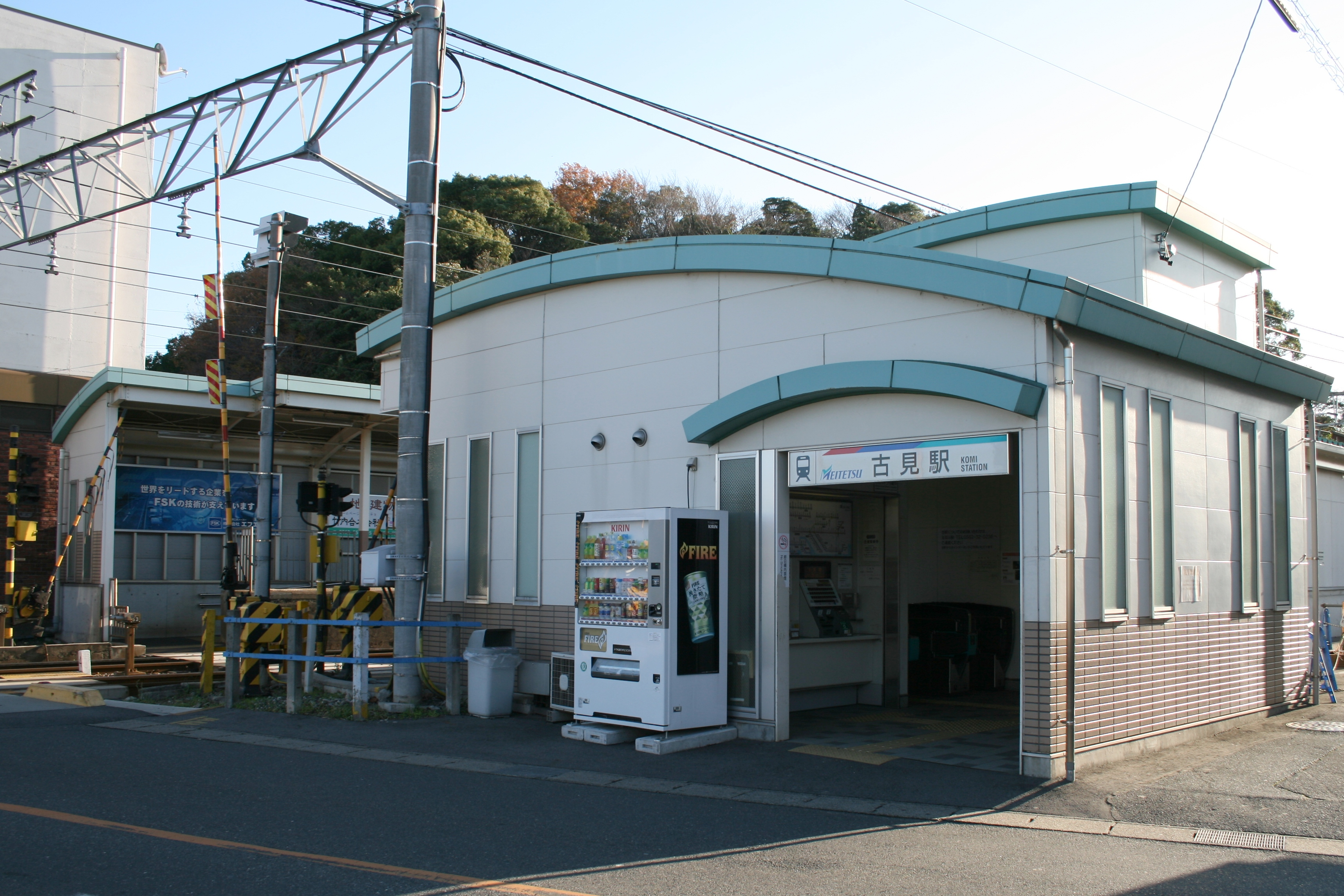
- Komi Station in December 2009

General information
- Location: Shinchi Morishita 29-3, Chita-shi, Aichi-ken 478-0017; Japan
- Coordinates: 34.9879°N 136.857°E
- Operator: Meitetsu
- Line: ■ Meitetsu Tokoname Line
- Distance: 17.3 kilometers from Jingū-mae
- Platforms: 2 side platforms

Other information
- Status: Unstaffed
- Station code: TA13
- Website: Official website

History
- Opened: February 18, 1912

Passengers
- FY2017: 3241 daily
Location
- Location within Aichi Prefecture Location within Japan

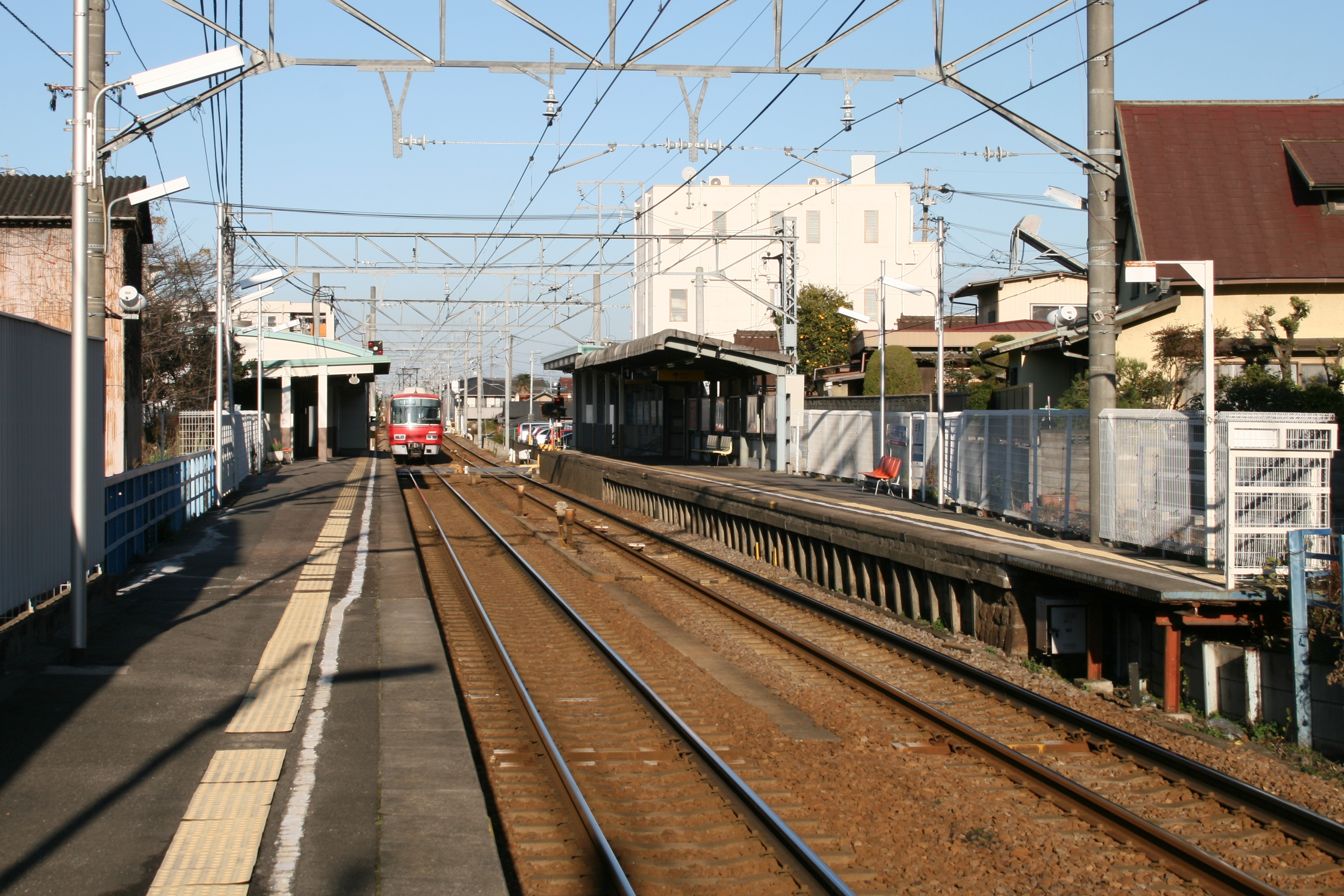
Platforms before 2019 lengthening

Komi Station (古見駅, Komi-eki) is a railway station in the city of Chita, Aichi, Japan, operated by Meitetsu.

== Lines ==
Komi Station is served by the Meitetsu Tokoname Line, and is located 17.3 kilometers from the starting point of the line at Jingū-mae.

== Station layout ==
The station has two opposed side platforms connected by a level crossing. Both platforms can handle trains of six carriages. Platform 1 used to be able to handle trains of only four carriages, however a platform extension work has been completed in 2019. The station is unattended.

=== Platforms ===
1	■ Tokoname Line	For Tokoname and Central Japan International Airport
2	■ Tokoname Line	For Ōtagawa and Jingū-mae

== Adjacent stations ==
←	Service	→
Meitetsu Tokoname Line
μSKY Limited Express: Does not stop at this station
Limited Express: Does not stop at this station
Rapid Express: Does not stop at this station
Asakura	Express	Shin Maiko
Asakura	Semi-Express	Shin Maiko
Asakura	Local	Nagaura

== Station history ==
Komi Station was opened on February 18, 1912 as a station on the Aichi Electric Railway Company. The Aichi Electric Railway became part of the Meitetsu group on August 1, 1935. In January 2005, the Tranpass system of magnetic fare cards with automatic turnstiles was implemented, and the station has been unattended since that point.

== Passenger statistics ==
In fiscal 2017, the station was used by an average of 3,241 passengers daily (boarding passengers only).

== Surrounding area ==
- Komi Post Office
- Japan National Route 155

== See also ==
- List of railway stations in Japan
