= Tōkai, Aichi =

Tōkai 東海市
- City
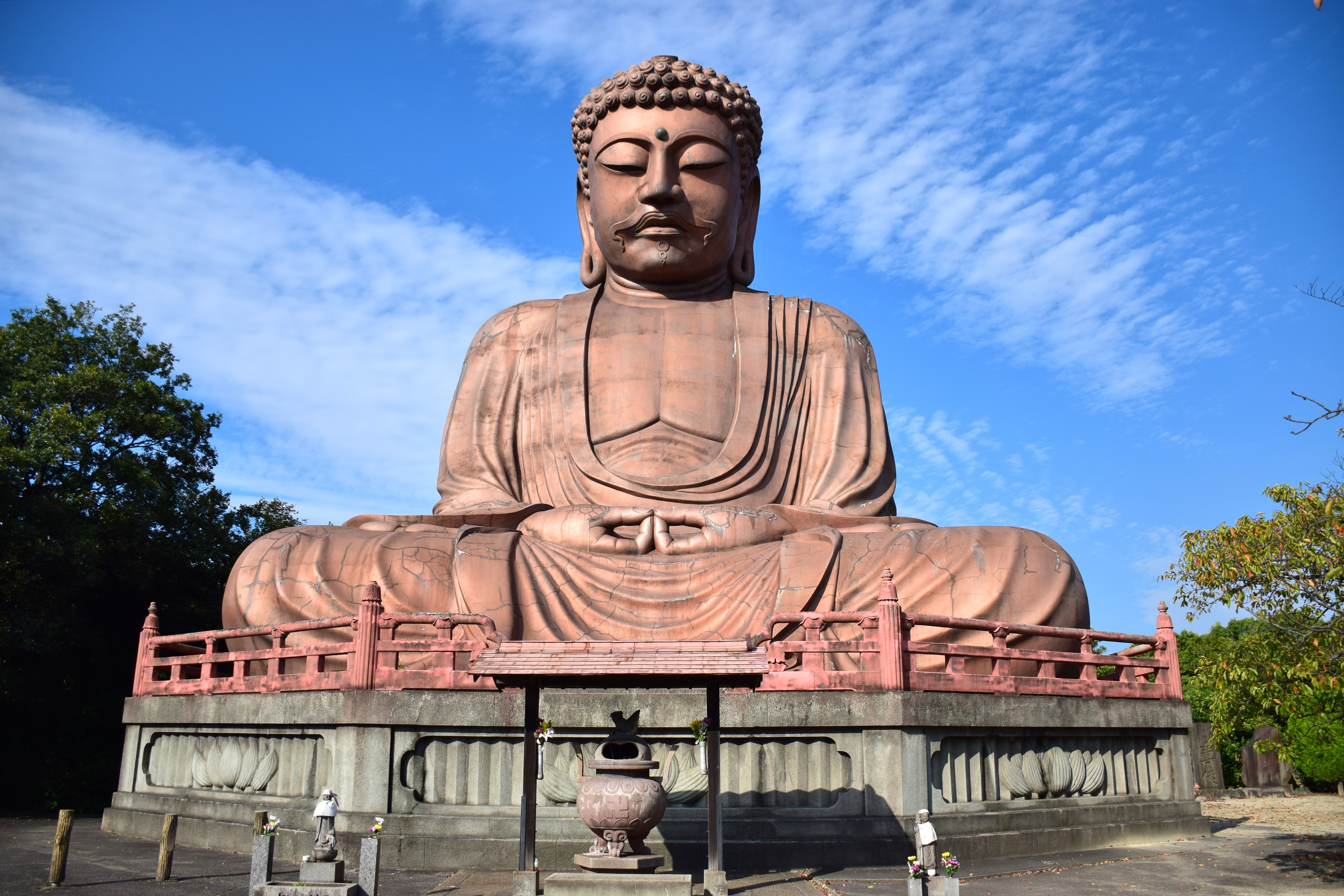
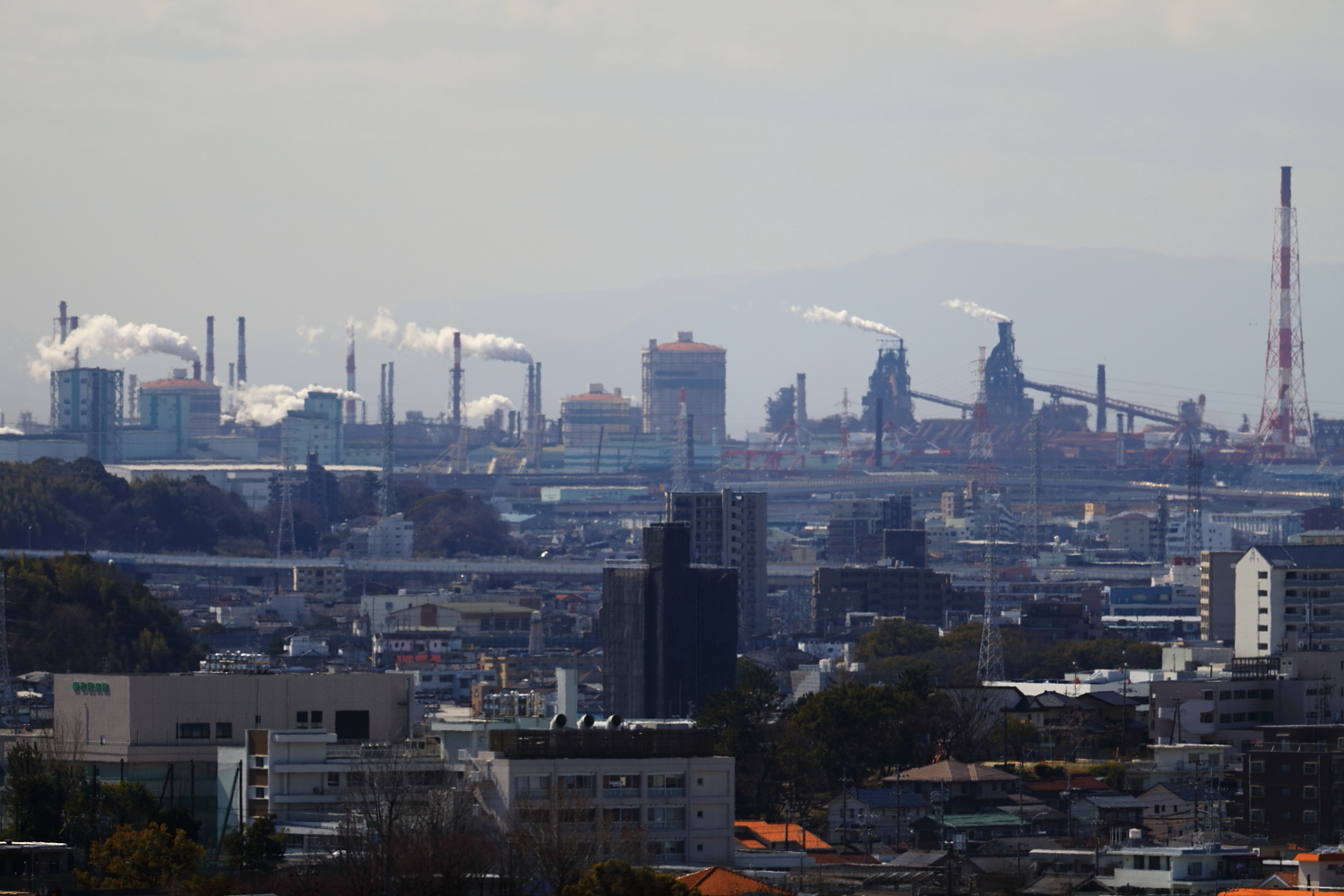
- Upper stage:Amida Buddha (Shurakuen Park); Lower stage:Nagoya iron and steel works

- Flag Seal

- Location of Tōkai in Aichi Prefecture

- Location in the Chubu region
- Coordinates: 35°01′23″N 136°54′7.9″E
- Country: Japan
- Region: Chūbu (Tōkai)
- Prefecture: Aichi

Government
  - Mayor: Katsushige Hanada

Area
  - Total: 43.43 km^{2} (16.77 sq mi)

Population (October 1, 2019)
  - Total: 113,698
  - Density: 2,618/km^{2} (6,780/sq mi)
- Time zone: UTC+9 (Japan Standard Time)
- Tree: Camphor laurel
- Flower: Satsuki azalea
- Phone number: 052-603-2211, 0562-33-1111
- Address: 1-1, Chūōmachi, Tōkai-shi, Aichi-ken 476-8601
- Website: Official website

Tōkai (東海市, Tōkai-shi) is a city located in Aichi Prefecture, Japan. As of 1 October 2019, the city had an estimated population of 113,698 in 51,035 households, and a population density of 2,618 persons per km^{2}. The total area of the city was 43.43 square kilometres (16.77 sq mi).

== Geography ==
Tōkai is located in the far northwestern neck of Chita Peninsula in southern Aichi Prefecture, and is bordered by Ise Bay to the east, and the metropolis of Nagoya to the north. It extends 8.06 kilometers from east to west and 10.97 kilometers from north to south. Much of the city is near sea level in altitude.

=== Climate ===
The city has a climate characterized by hot and humid summers, and relatively mild winters (Köppen climate classification Cfa). The average annual temperature in Tōkai is 15.7 °C. The average annual rainfall is 1730 mm with September as the wettest month. The temperatures are highest on average in August, at around 27.9 °C, and lowest in January, at around 4.5 °C.

Climate data for Tōkai (1981–2010)
Month	Jan	Feb	Mar	Apr	May	Jun	Jul	Aug	Sep	Oct	Nov	Dec	Year
Record high °C (°F)	16.8 (62.2)	20.2 (68.4)	24.9 (76.8)	29.9 (85.8)	32.3 (90.1)	36.2 (97.2)	38.7 (101.7)	39.2 (102.6)	38.8 (101.8)	30.1 (86.2)	26.1 (79.0)	21.3 (70.3)	39.2 (102.6)
Mean daily maximum °C (°F)	9.5 (49.1)	10.5 (50.9)	14.1 (57.4)	20.1 (68.2)	24.3 (75.7)	27.4 (81.3)	31.2 (88.2)	32.9 (91.2)	28.6 (83.5)	23.3 (73.9)	17.6 (63.7)	12.2 (54.0)	21.0 (69.8)
Daily mean °C (°F)	4.9 (40.8)	5.6 (42.1)	8.9 (48.0)	14.4 (57.9)	18.9 (66.0)	22.6 (72.7)	26.4 (79.5)	27.8 (82.0)	24.2 (75.6)	18.3 (64.9)	12.5 (54.5)	7.3 (45.1)	16.0 (60.8)
Mean daily minimum °C (°F)	0.7 (33.3)	1.2 (34.2)	4.1 (39.4)	9.2 (48.6)	14.0 (57.2)	18.6 (65.5)	22.7 (72.9)	23.9 (75.0)	20.4 (68.7)	14.1 (57.4)	8.0 (46.4)	2.8 (37.0)	11.7 (53.1)
Record low °C (°F)	−6.3 (20.7)	−6.2 (20.8)	−3.5 (25.7)	−0.2 (31.6)	5.8 (42.4)	11.9 (53.4)	16.6 (61.9)	16.6 (61.9)	11.1 (52.0)	4.0 (39.2)	−0.8 (30.6)	−3.7 (25.3)	−6.3 (20.7)
Average precipitation mm (inches)	45.7 (1.80)	62.0 (2.44)	114.5 (4.51)	123.5 (4.86)	149.9 (5.90)	200.5 (7.89)	173.9 (6.85)	119.7 (4.71)	236.7 (9.32)	137.9 (5.43)	82.2 (3.24)	43.2 (1.70)	1,489.6 (58.65)
Mean monthly sunshine hours	157.6	163.6	186.5	197.0	183.8	144.4	164.6	208.9	158.5	164.8	156.1	161.9	2,052.1
Source: Japan Meteorological Agency

=== Demographics ===
Per Japanese census data, the population of Tōkai greatly expanded in the 1960s, and has continued to grow at a reduced rate from that period over the past 50 years.

Historical population
Year	Pop.	±%
1940	22,512	—
1950	29,888	+32.8%
1960	33,965	+13.6%
1970	86,608	+155.0%
1980	96,048	+10.9%
1990	97,358	+1.4%
2000	99,921	+2.6%
2010	107,704	+7.8%

=== Neighboring municipalities ===
Aichi Prefecture

- Chita
- Higashiura
- Nagoya (Minami-ku, Minato-ku, Midori-ku)
- Ōbu

== History ==
=== Early modern period ===
During the Edo period, the area around Tōkai consisted of a number of fishing settlements and was governed as part of Owari Domain under the Tokugawa shogunate.

=== Late modern period ===
With the establishment of the modern municipalities system after the start of the Meiji period, the area was organized into a number of villages within Chita District, Aichi.

=== Contemporary history ===
The city of Tōkai was established on April 1, 1969, through the merger of the former towns of Yokosuka and Ueno within Chita District.

== Government ==
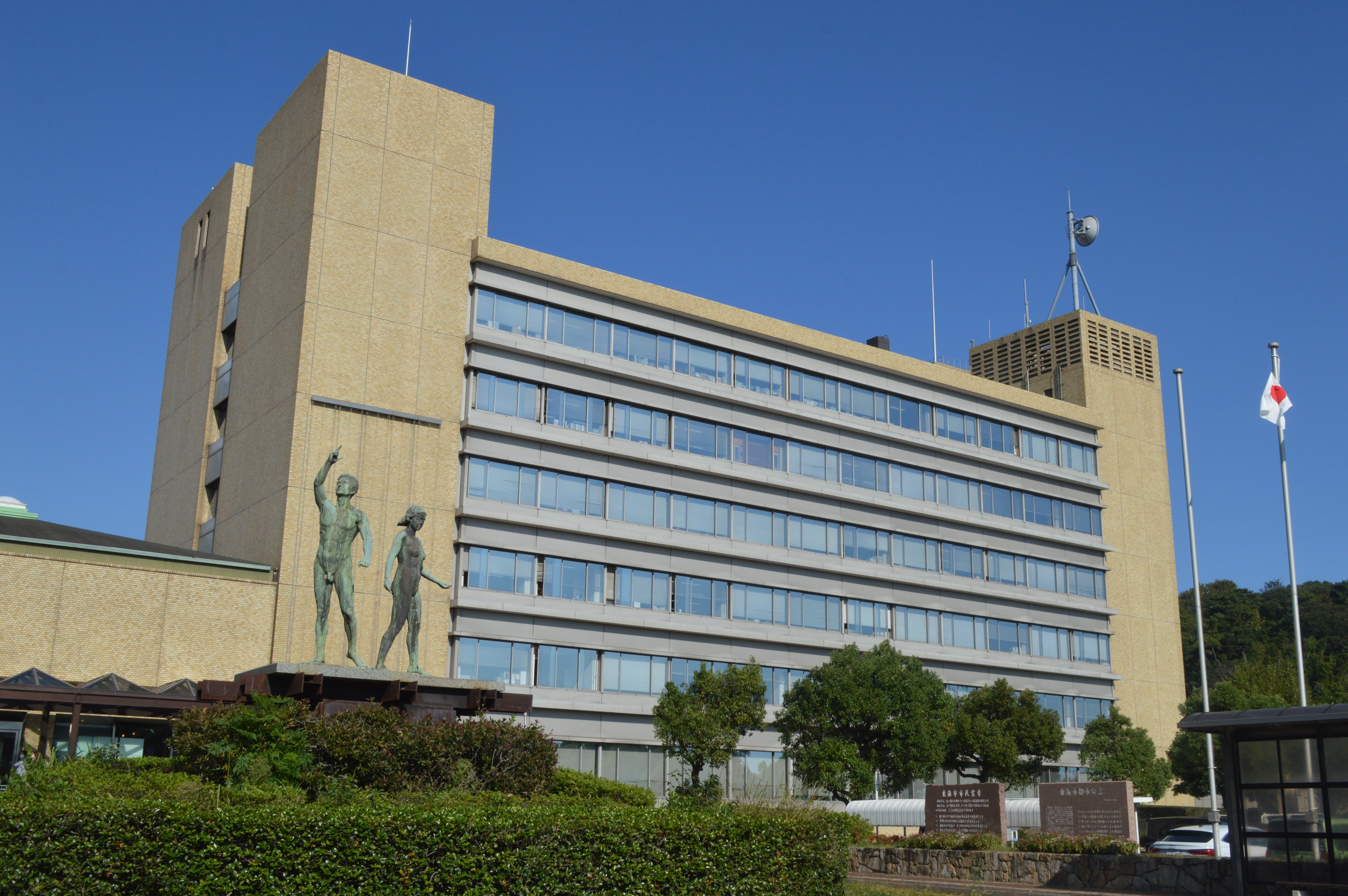
Tōkai city hall

Tōkai has a mayor-council form of government with a directly elected mayor and a unicameral city legislature of 22 members. The city contributes two members to the Aichi Prefectural Assembly. In terms of national politics, the city is part of Aichi District 8 of the lower house of the Diet of Japan.

== Sister cities ==
=== International ===
- Nilüfer, Bursa Province, Turkey, since May 10, 2007
- Shire of Macedon Ranges, Victoria, Australia, since October 16, 2014

=== National ===
- Yonezawa, Yamagata Prefecture, since October 20, 1999
- Kamaishi, Iwate Prefecture, since March 24, 2007
- Okinawa, Okinawa Prefecture, since November 20, 2009

== Economy ==
=== Secondary sector of the economy ===
==== Manufacturing ====
Tōkai has a strong industrial base along its coastline, dominated by a large steel mill owned by Nippon Steel and by Aichi Steel, which has its headquarters and three manufacturing plants in the city.

== Education ==
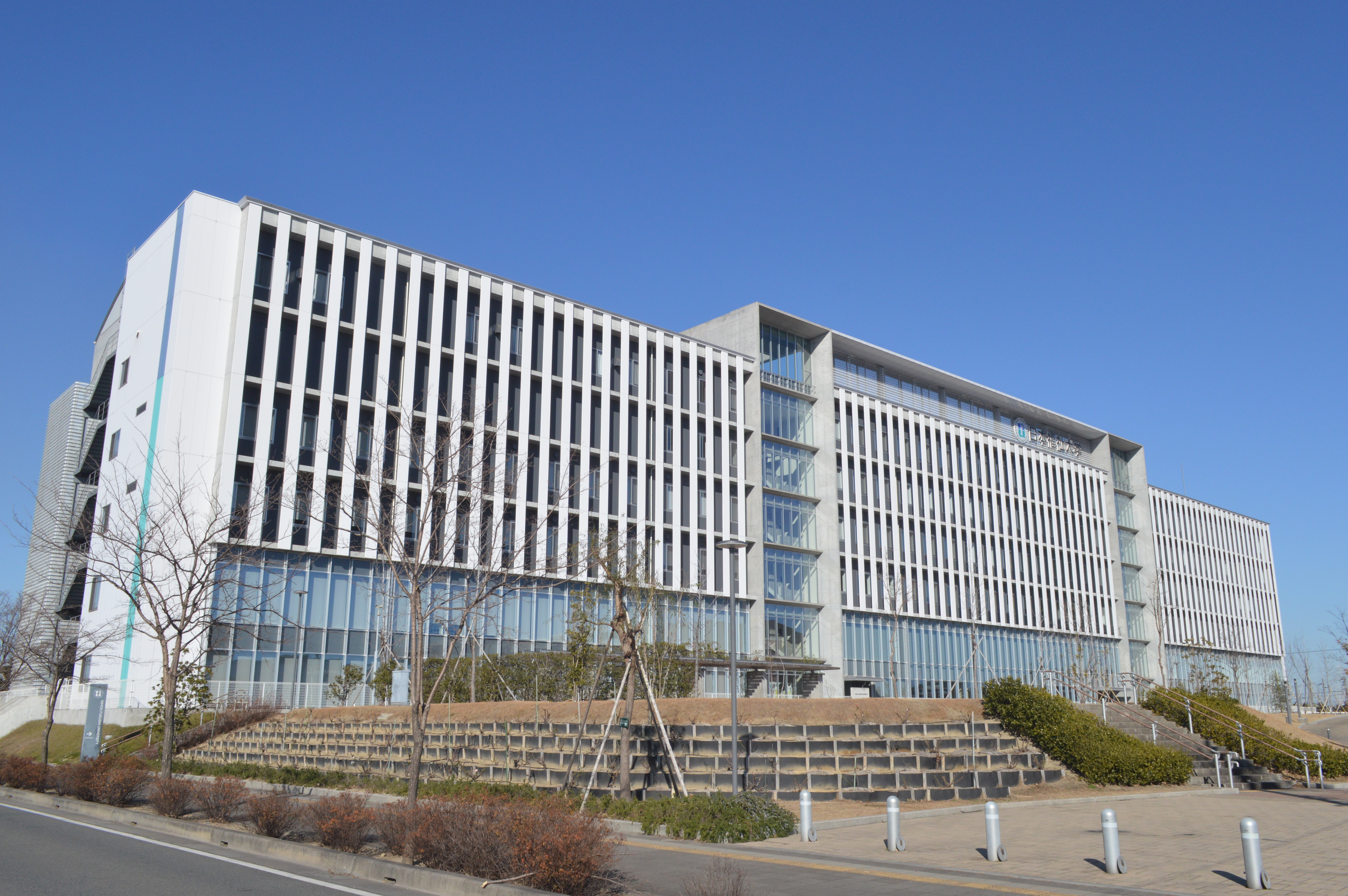
Nihon Fukushi University(Tokai campus)

=== Universities ===
- Nihon Fukushi University – Tokai campus
- Seijoh University

=== Schools ===
- Tōkai has twelve public elementary schools and six public middle schools operated by the city government and three public high schools operated by the Aichi Prefectural Board of Education.

== Transportation ==
=== Railways ===
==== Conventional lines ====
Meitetsu

- Tokoname Line: - Nawa - Shūrakuen - Shinnittetsu-mae - Ōtagawa - Owari Yokosuka -
- Kōwa Line: - Ōtagawa - Takayokosuka - Minami-Kagiya - Yawata Shinden -

=== Roads ===
==== Expressways ====
- Isewangan Expressway
- Chitahantō Road (no interchange)
- Nagoya Expressway Route 4

==== Japan National Route ====
- National Route 155
- National Route 247
- National Route 302
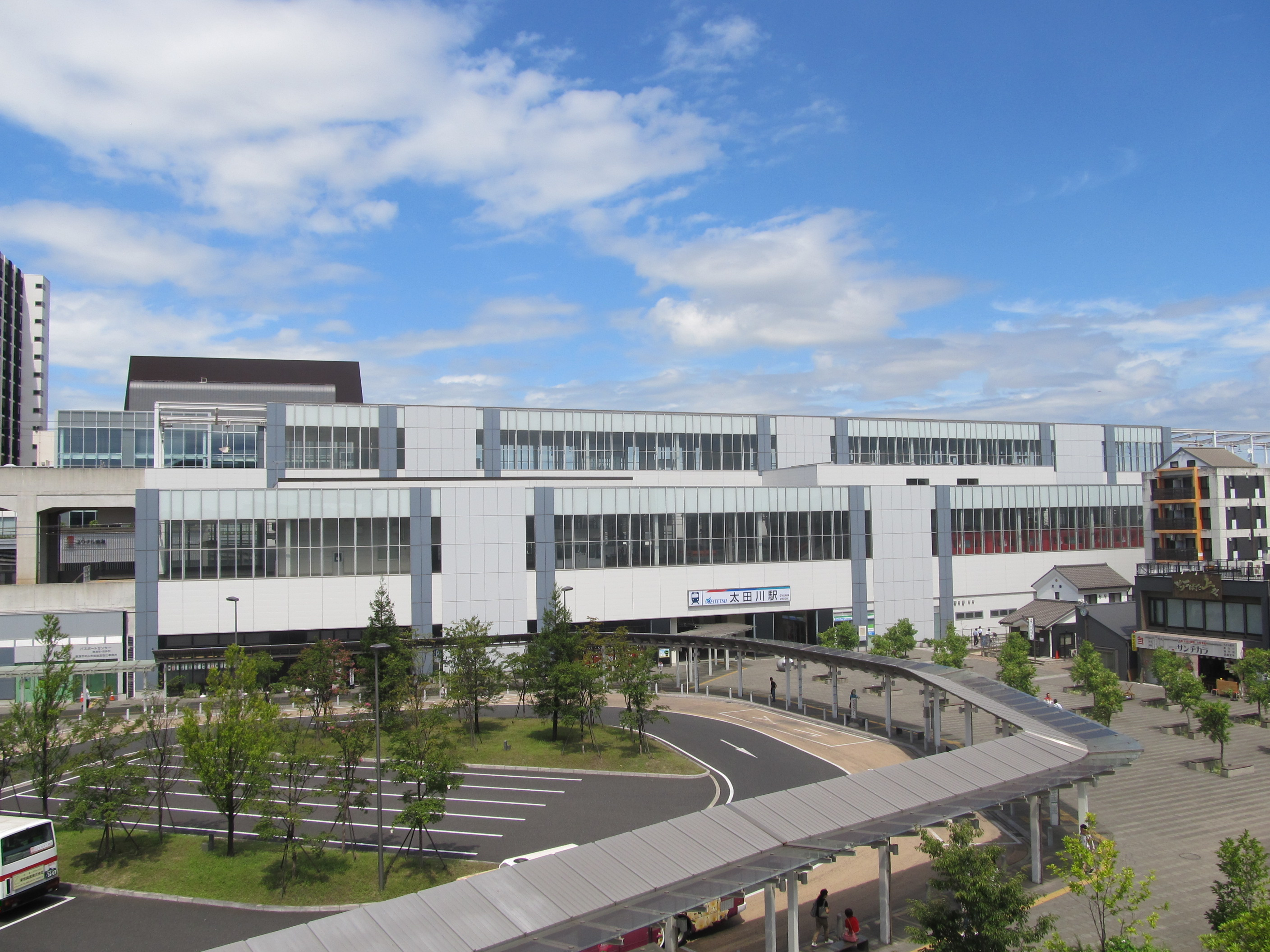
Ōtagawa Station

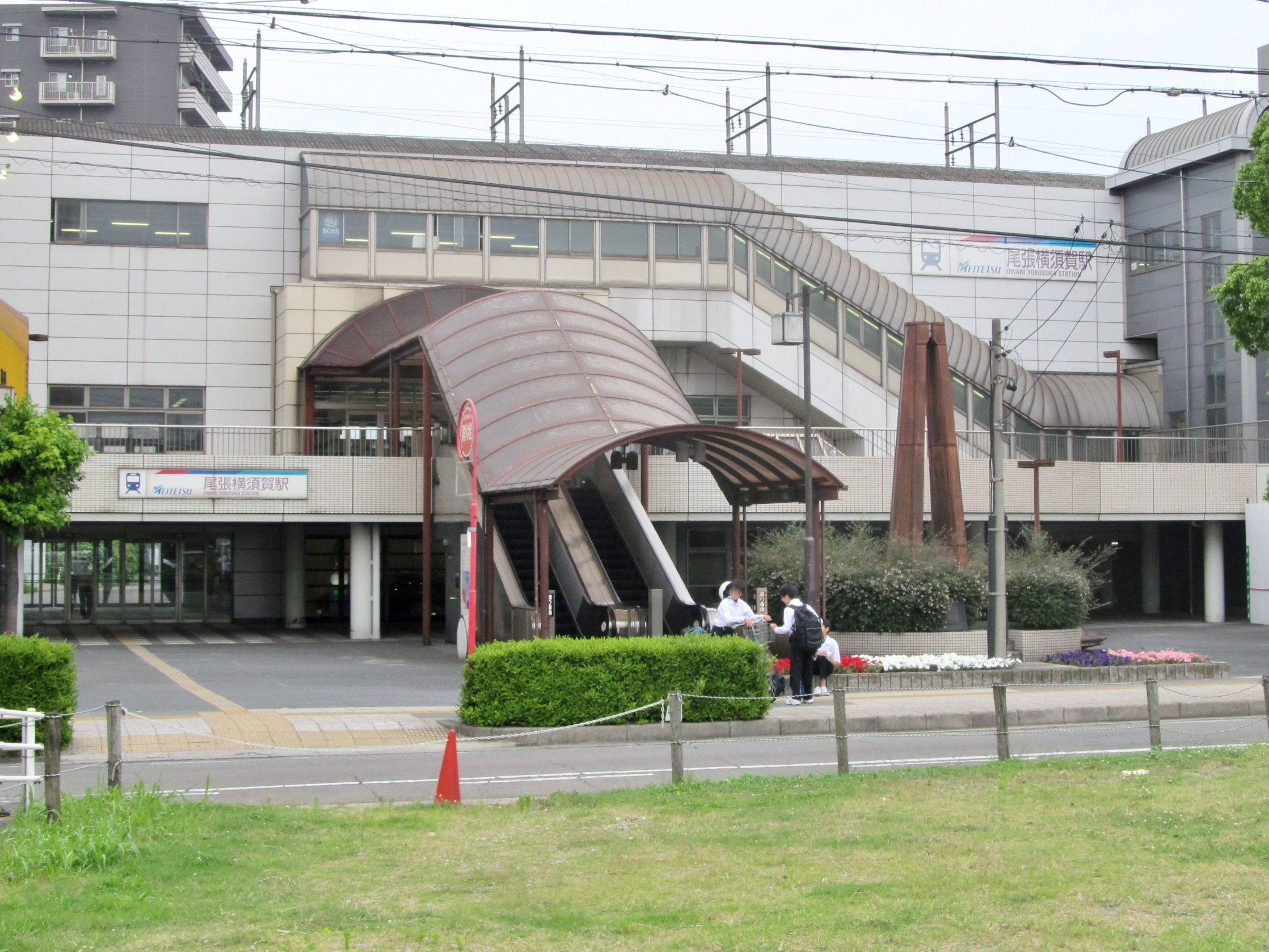
Owari Yokosuka Station

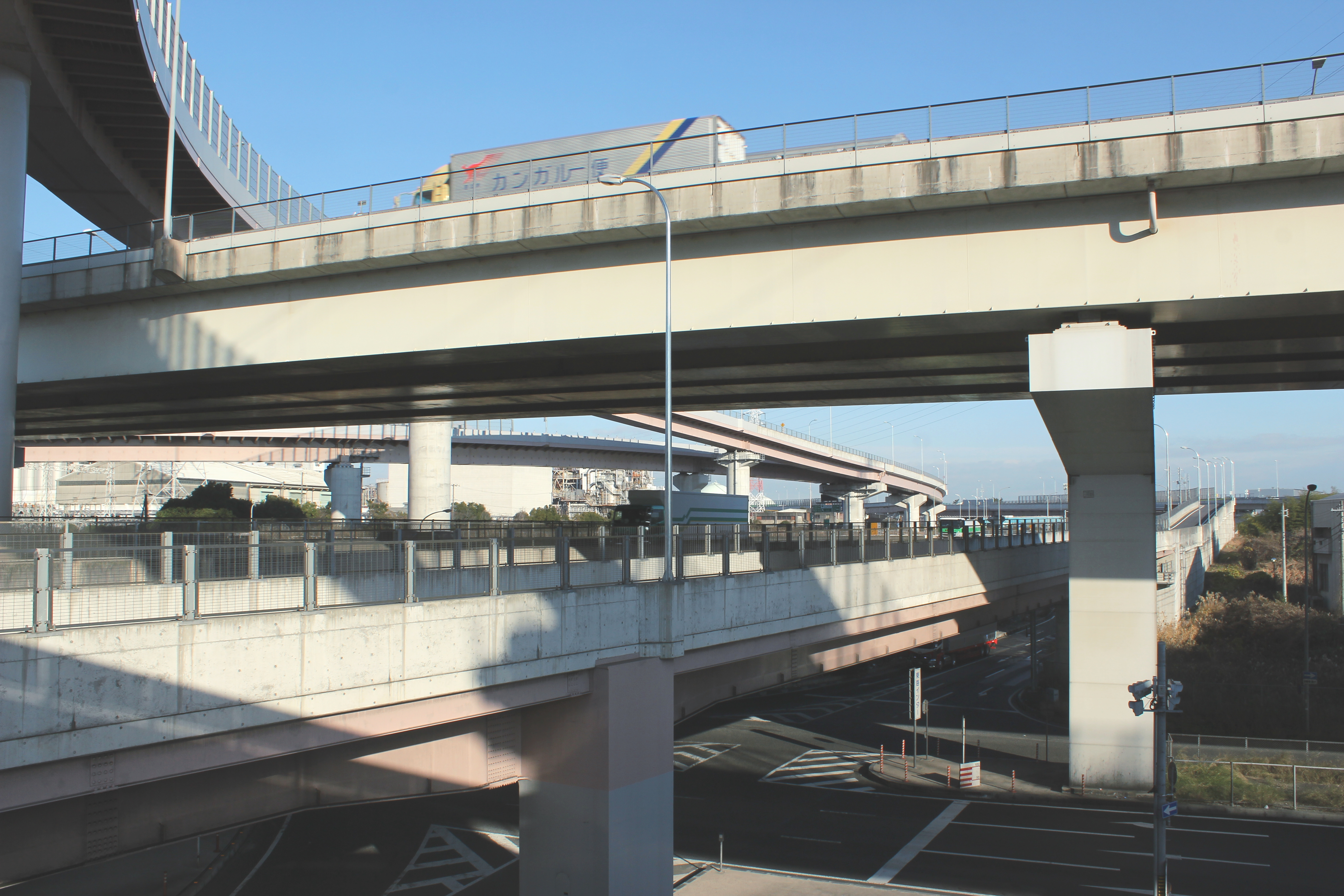
Tōkai JCT

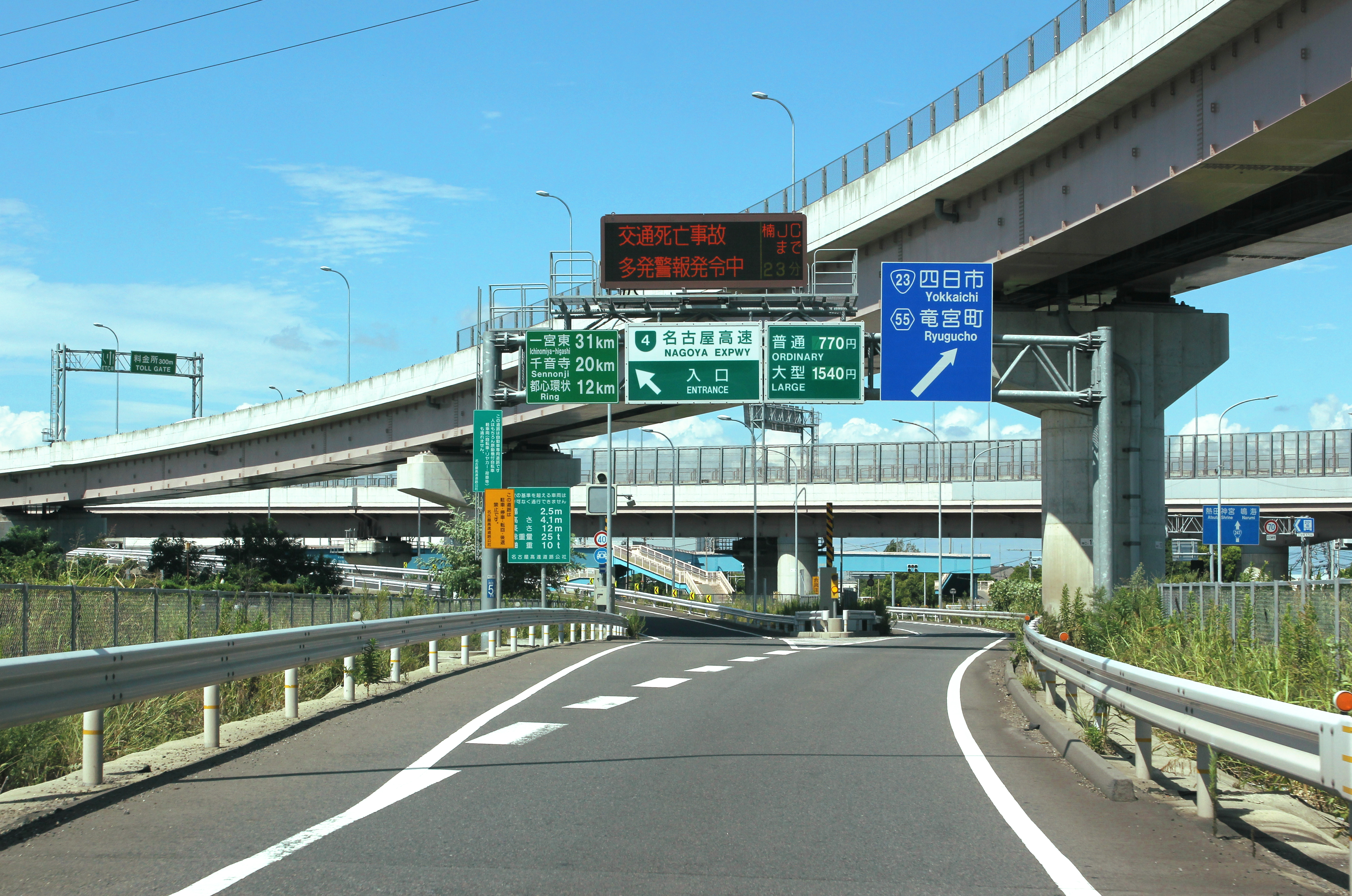
Tōkai-shimpo Entrance

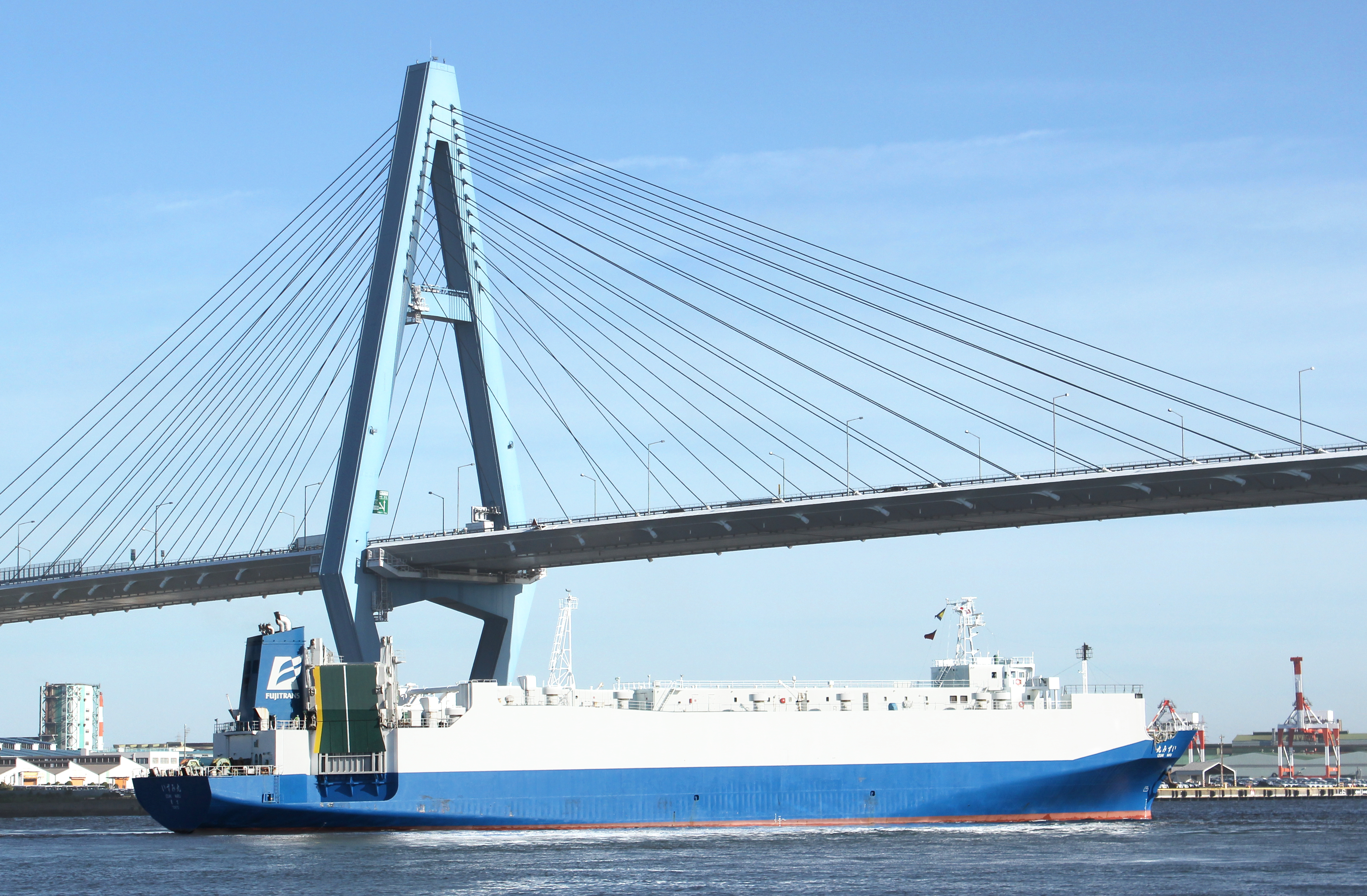
Meiko East Big Bridge

== Local attractions ==
=== Tourist attraction ===
Temples

- Gyokurin-ji
- Kanpuku-ji
- Miroku-ji
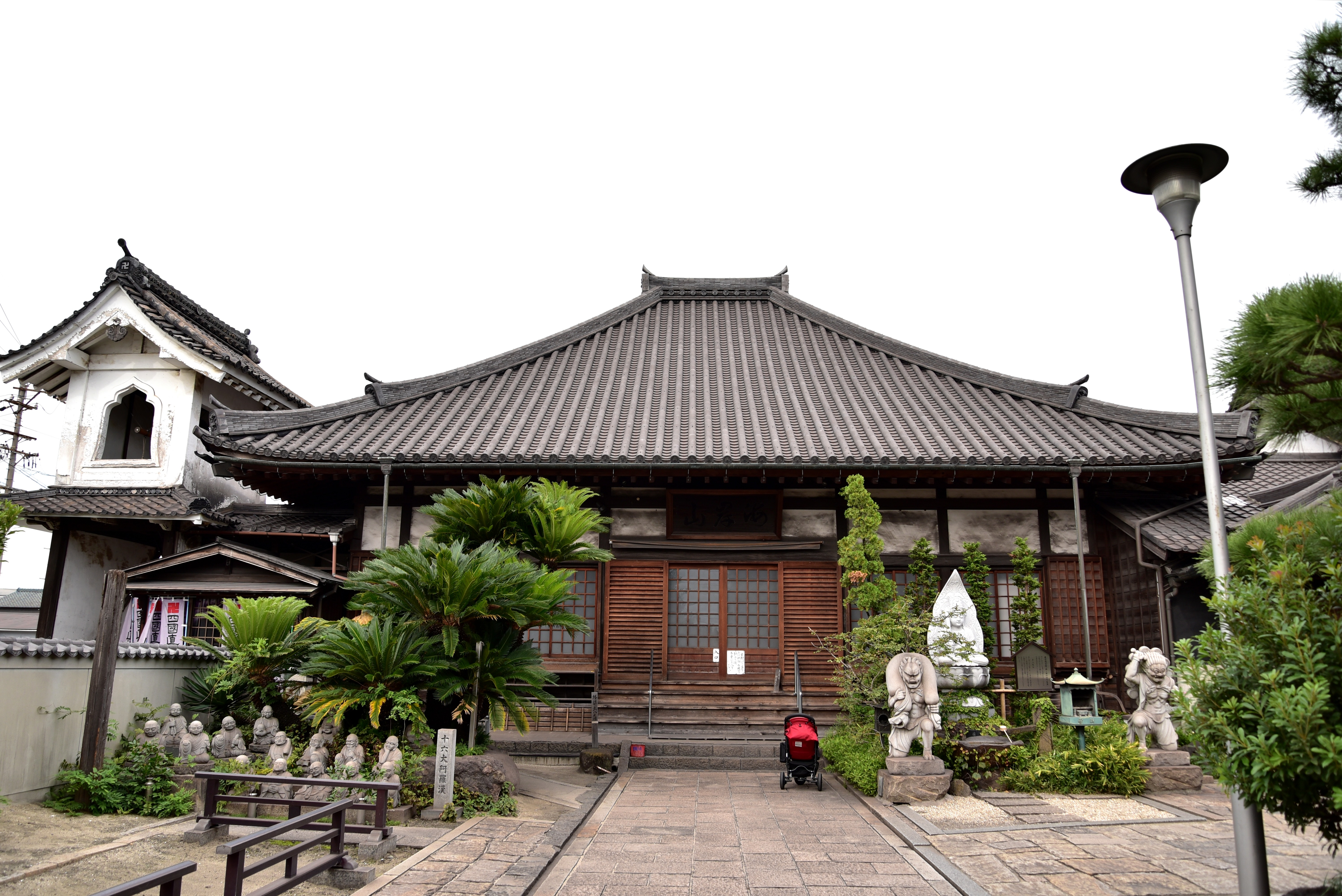
Gyokurin-ji

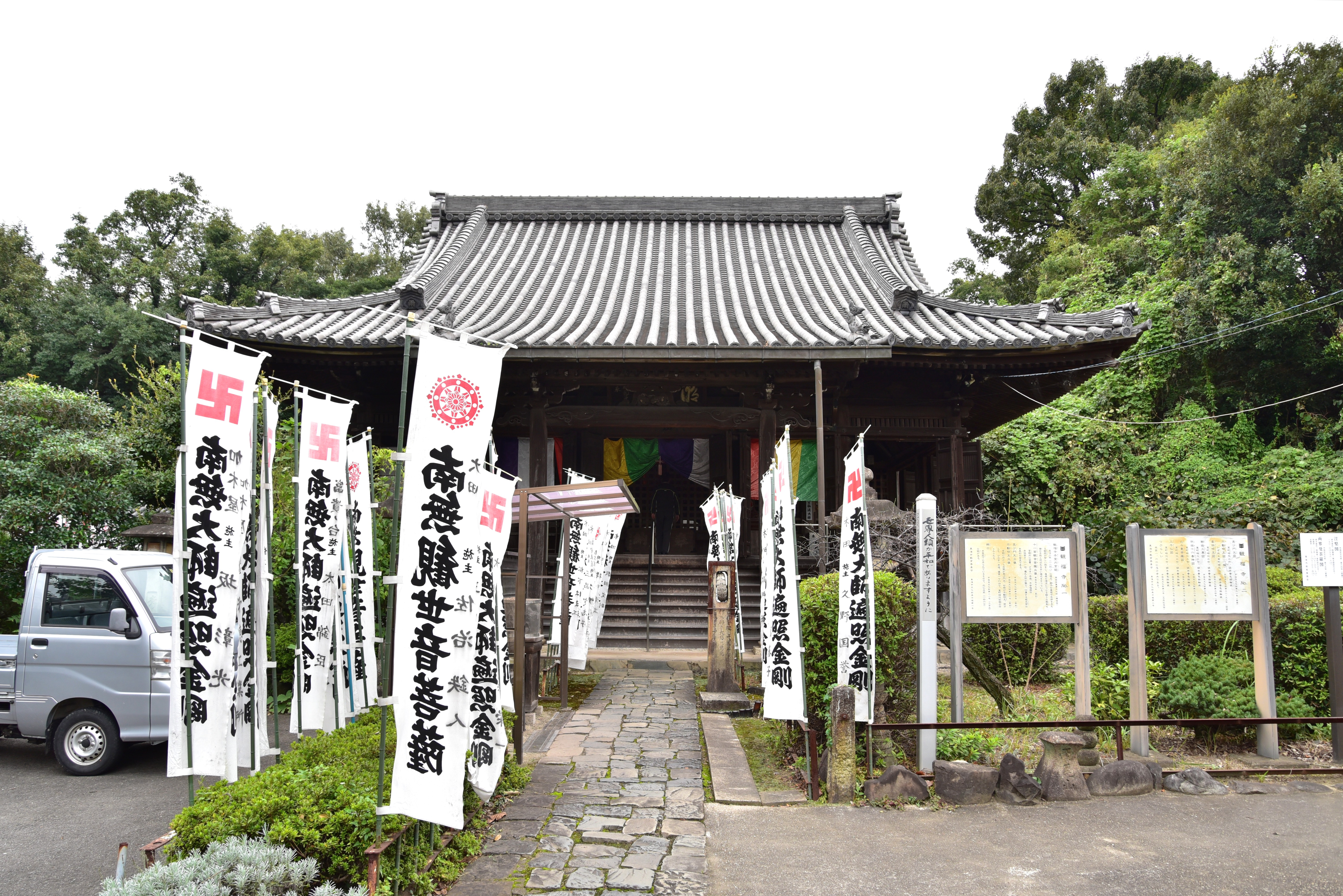
Kanpuku-ji

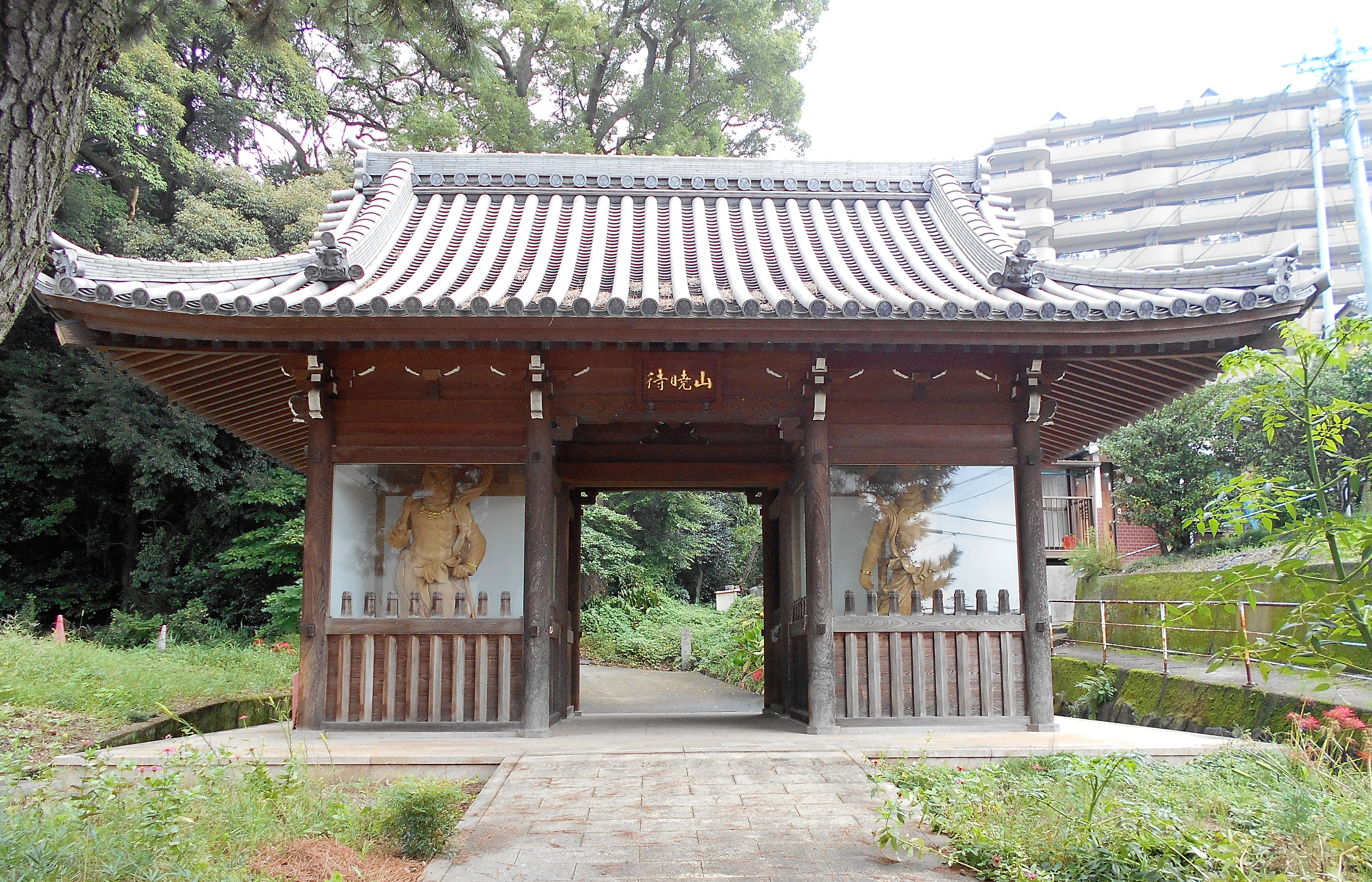
Miroku-ji

Parks

- Oike Park
- Shurakuen Park

Museums

- GAS ENERGY EXHIBIT HALL
- Heisyu Memorial Hall
- KAGOME Memorial Hall
- The Reverend Mr.ICHITAROU TOMATO Memorial Hall
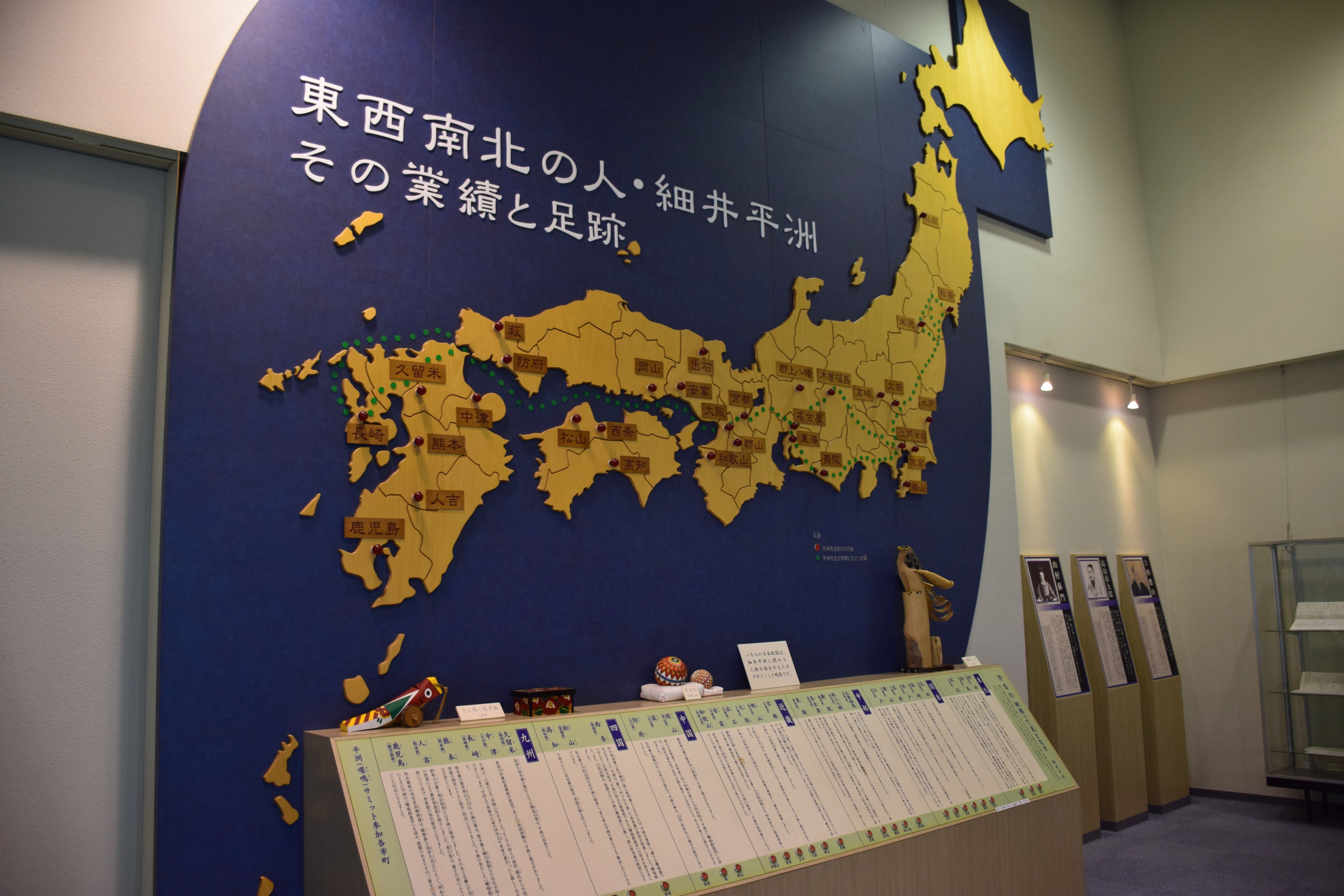
Heisyu Memorial Hall

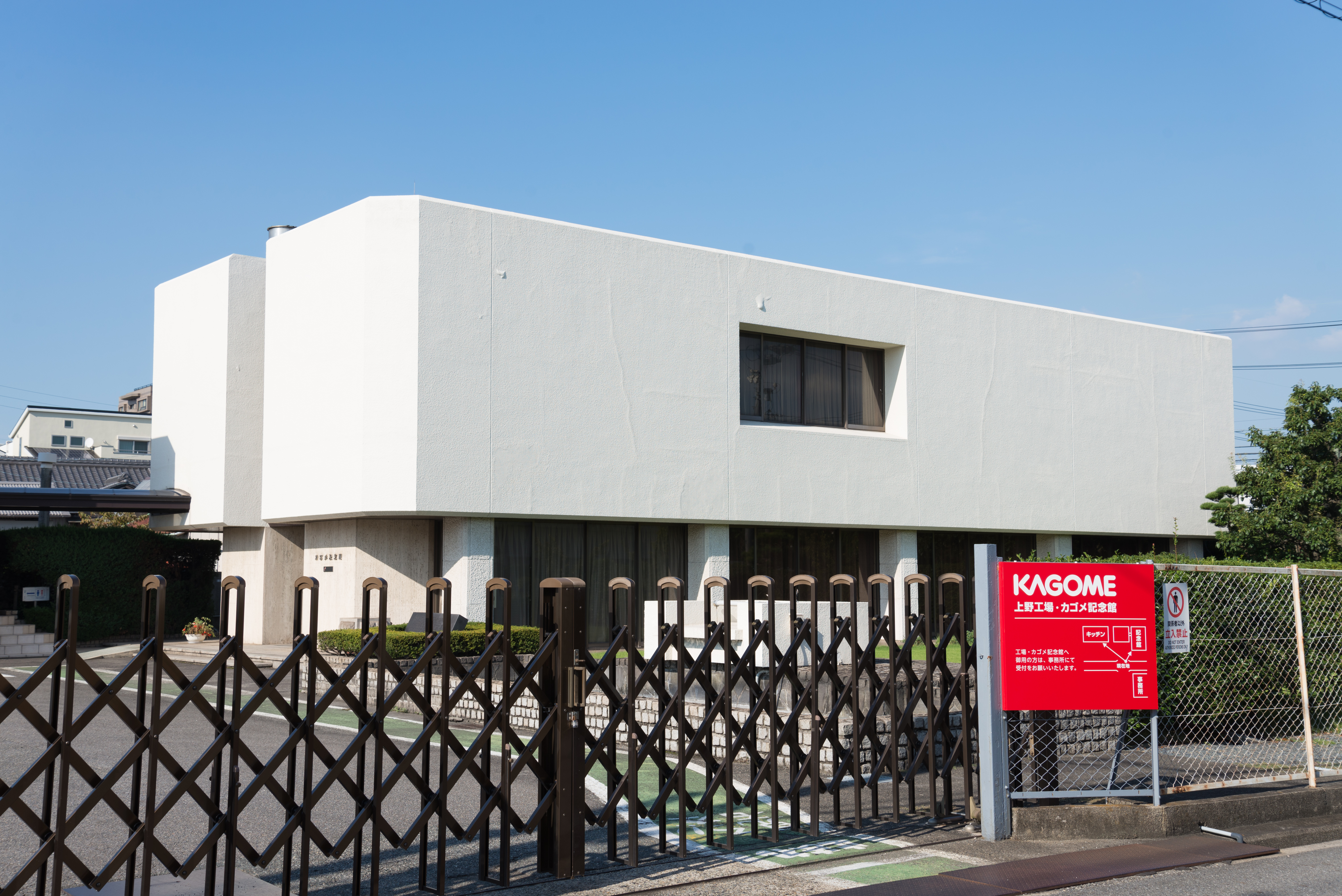
KAGOME Memorial Hall

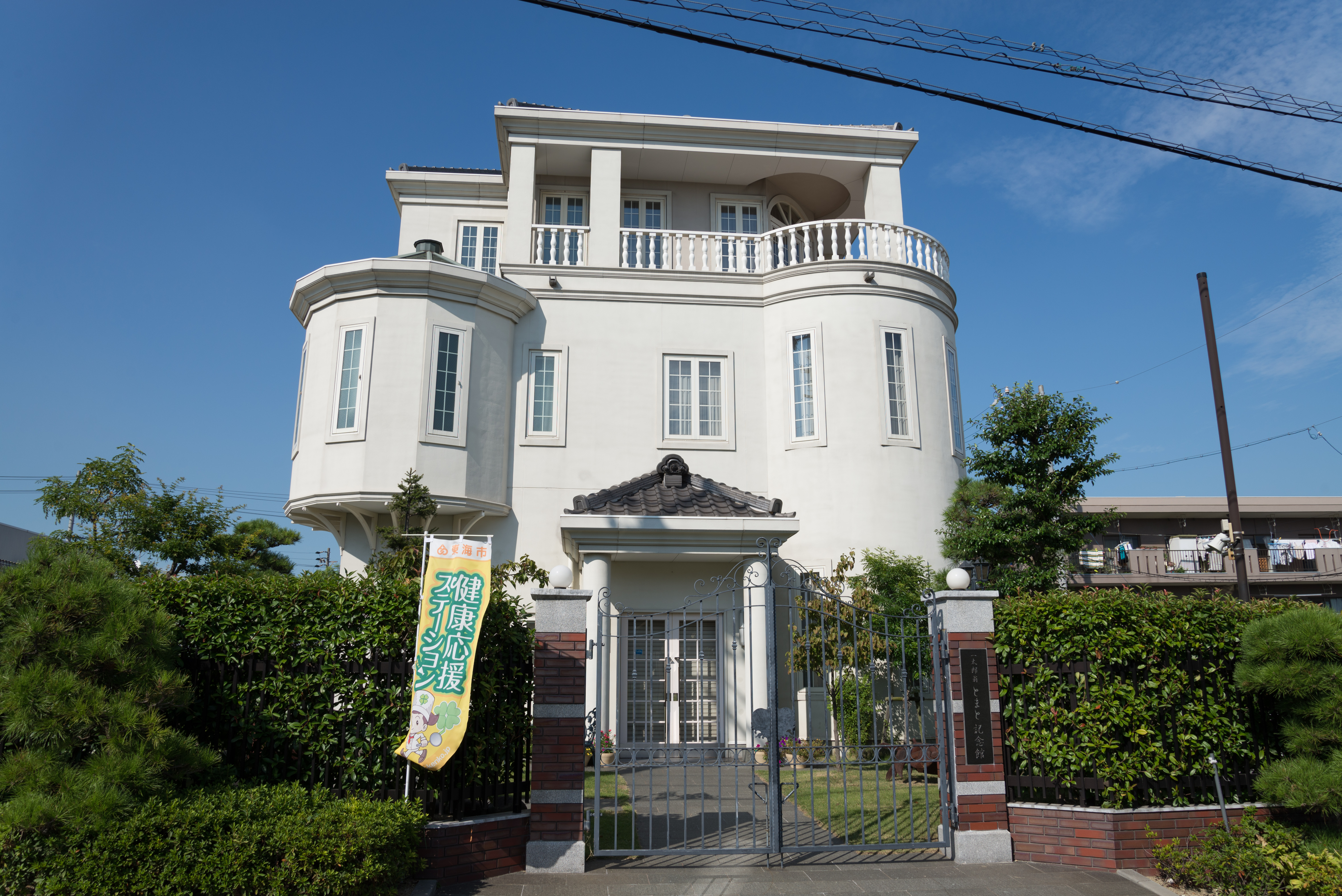
TOMATO Memorial Hall

== Culture ==
=== Festivals ===
- Ōta Festival
- Owari-Yokosuka Matsuri
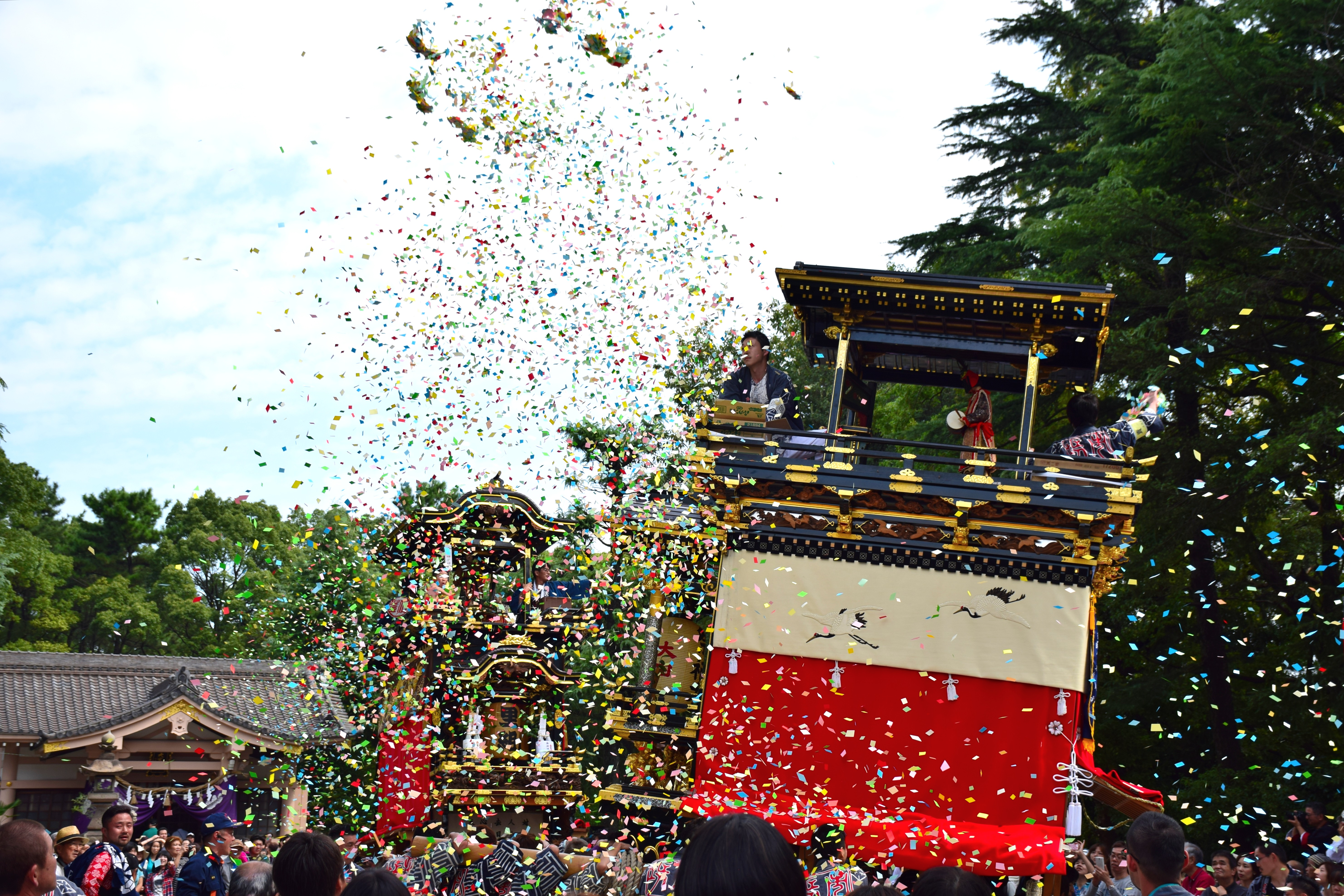
Ōta Festival

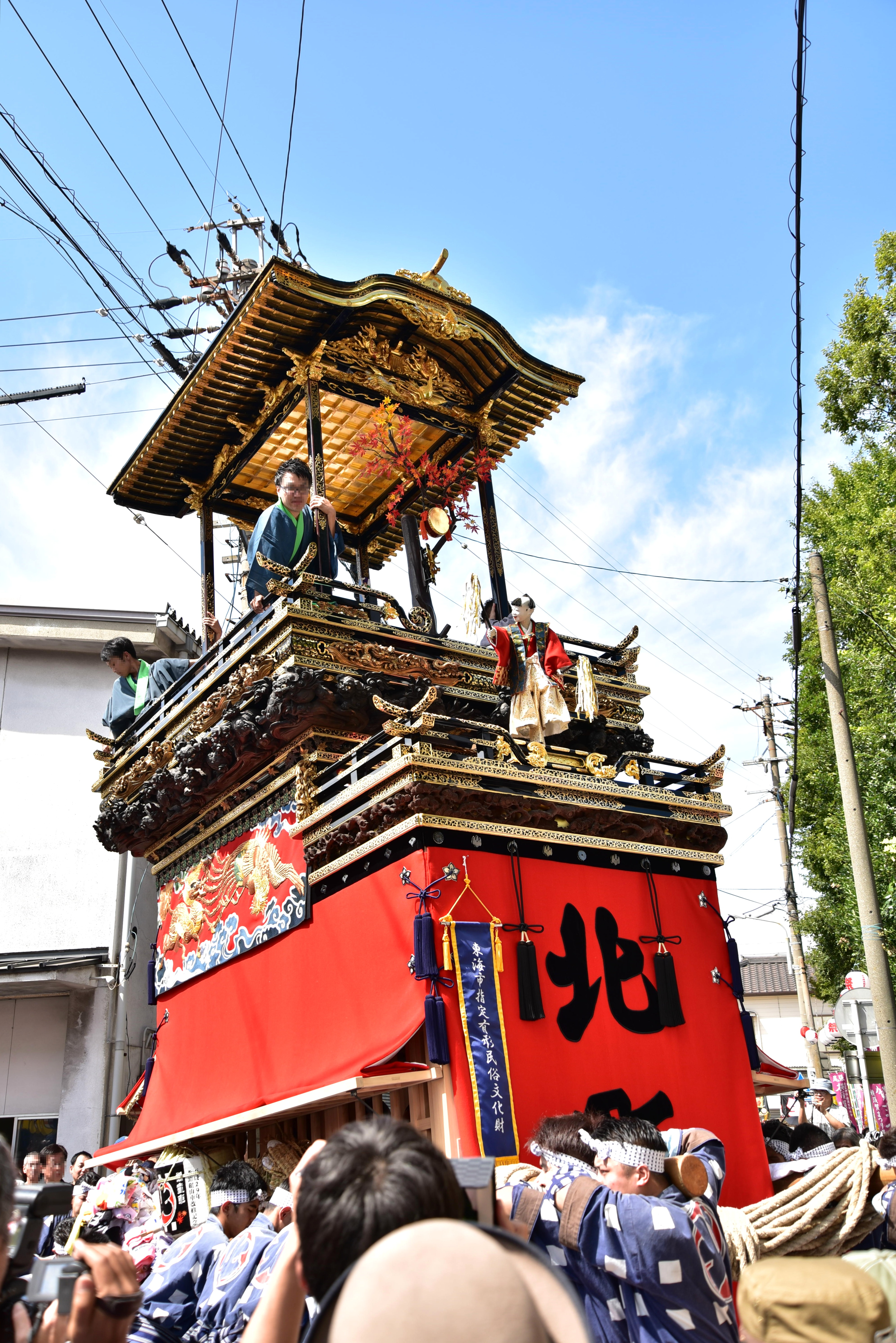
Owari-Yokosuka Matsuri

== Notable people from Tōkai ==
- Dragon Kid, professional wrestler
- Kamakichi Kishinouye, biologist
- Tomohiro Kondo, professional golfer
- Aoi Morikawa, Actor and Model

== In pop culture ==
- Tōkai is the setting for the manga and anime series The Quintessential Quintuplets.
