= Hinaga Station (Aichi) =

Railway station in Chita, Aichi Prefecture, Japan

Hinaga Station 日長駅

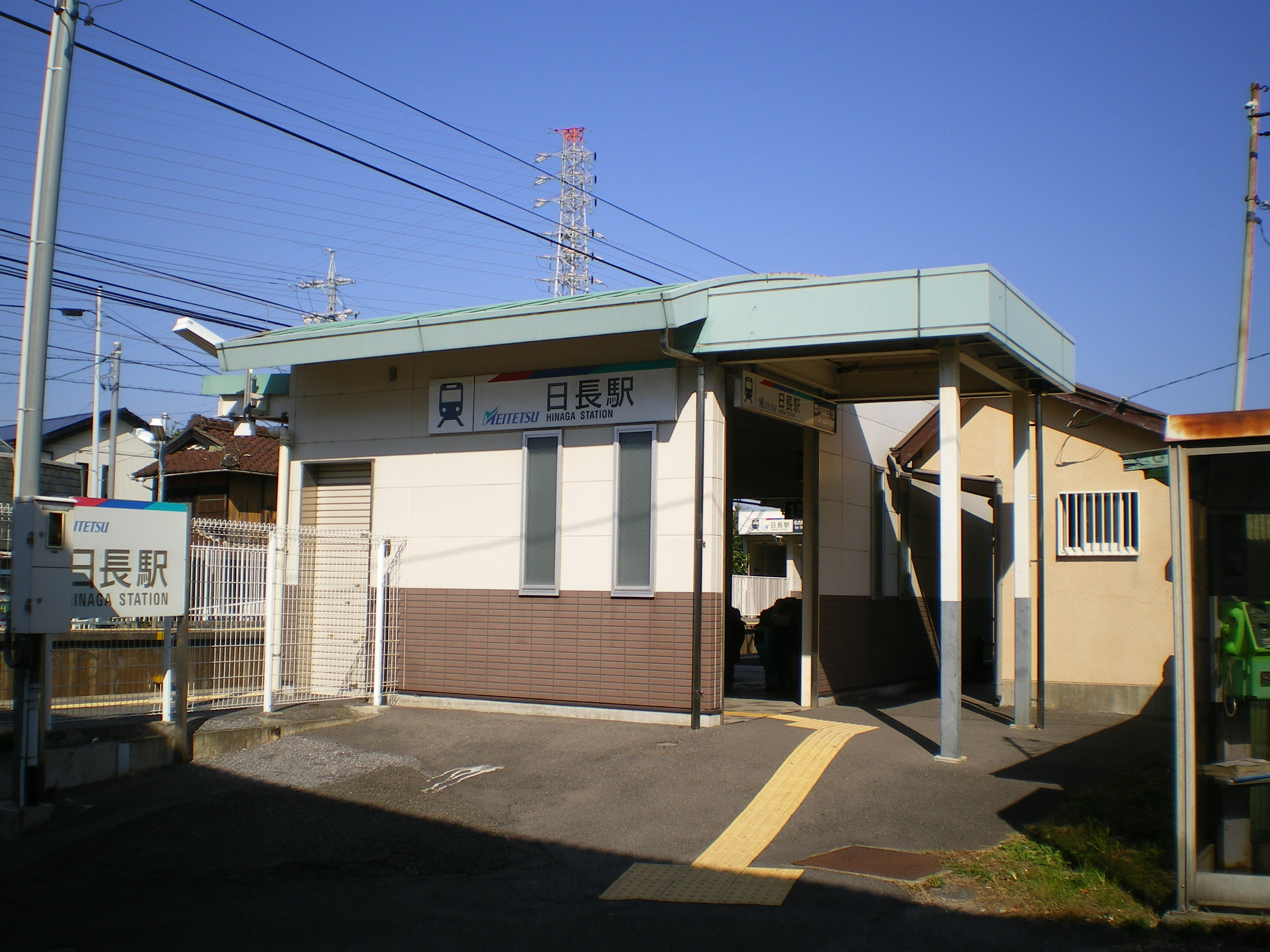

General information
- Location: Morishita-108 Hinaga Chita-shi, Aichi-Can 478-0041; Japan
- Coordinates: 34.9618°N 136.8323°E
- Operator: Meitetsu
- Line: ■ Meitetsu Tokoname Line
- Distance: 21.0 kilometers from Jingū-mae
- Platforms: 2 side platforms

Other information
- Status: Unstaffed
- Station code: TA15
- Website: Official website

History
- Opened: February 18, 1912

Passengers
- FY2017: 308 daily

Services
Preceding station	Meitetsu	Following station
Shin-Maiko towards Tokoname	Tokoname Line Local	Nagaura towards Jingū-mae
Location
- Location within Aichi Prefecture Location within Japan

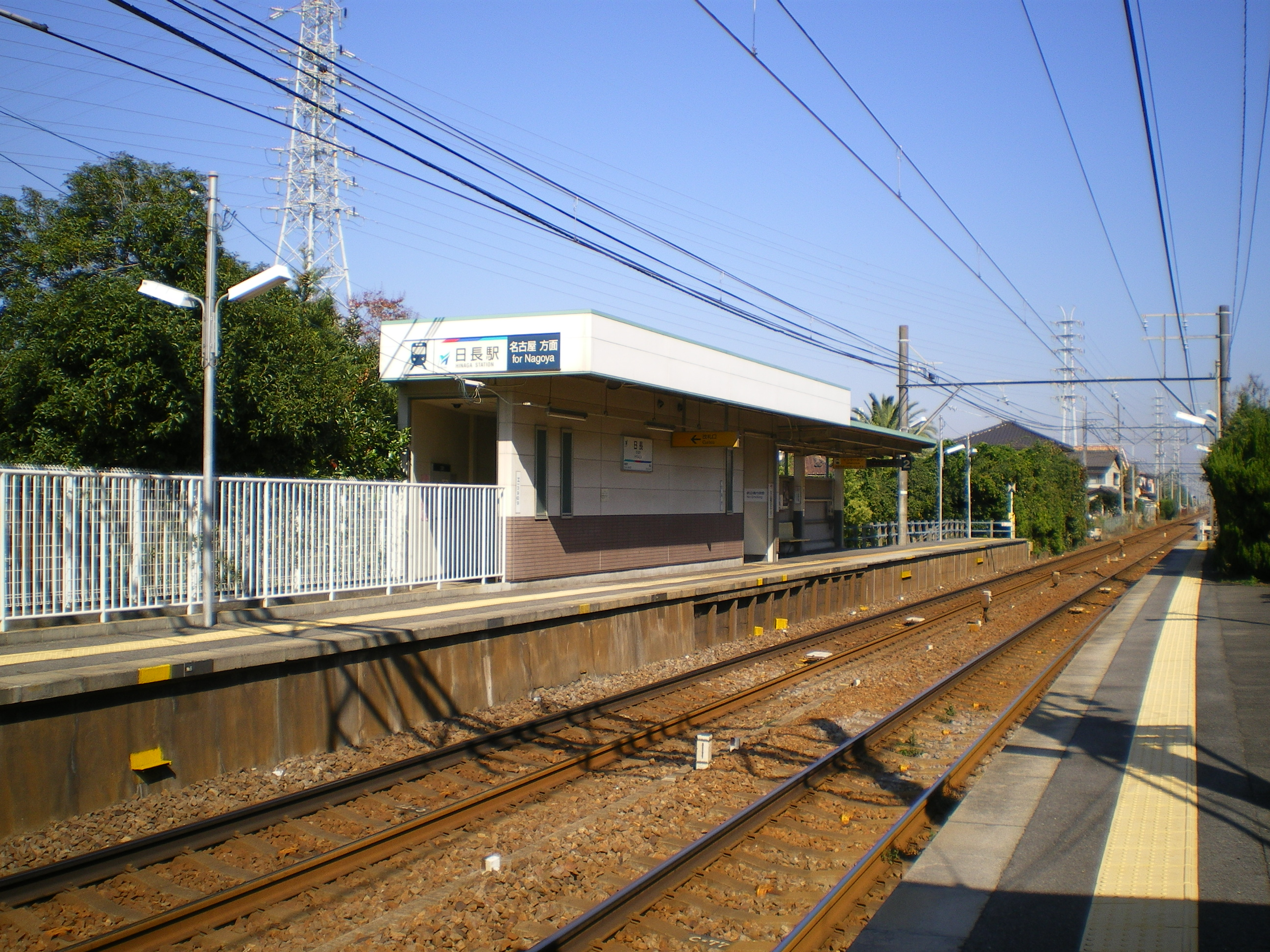
Platforms

Hinaga Station (日長駅, Hinaga-eki) is a railway station in the city of Chita, Aichi, Japan, operated by Meitetsu.

== Lines ==
Hinaga Station is served by the Meitetsu Tokoname Line, and is located 21.0 kilometers from the starting point of the line at Jingū-mae.

== Station layout ==
The station has two opposed side platforms connected by an underground passage. Both platforms are short, and can handle trains of only four carriages or less. The station is unattended.

=== Platforms ===
1	■ Tokoname Line	For Tokoname and Central Japan International Airport
2	■ Tokoname Line	For Ōtagawa and Jingū-mae

== Station history ==
Hinaga Station was opened on February 18, 1912, as a station on the Aichi Electric Railway Company. The Aichi Electric Railway became part of the Meitetsu group on August 1, 1935. The station has been unattended since September 1970. In January 2005, the Tranpass system of magnetic fare cards with automatic turnstiles was implemented.

== Passenger statistics ==
In fiscal 2017, the station was used by an average of 308 passengers daily (boarding passengers only).

== Surrounding area ==
- Japan National Route 155

== See also ==
- List of railway stations in Japan
