= Seijoh University =

University in Aichi Prefecture, Japan

- 星城大学
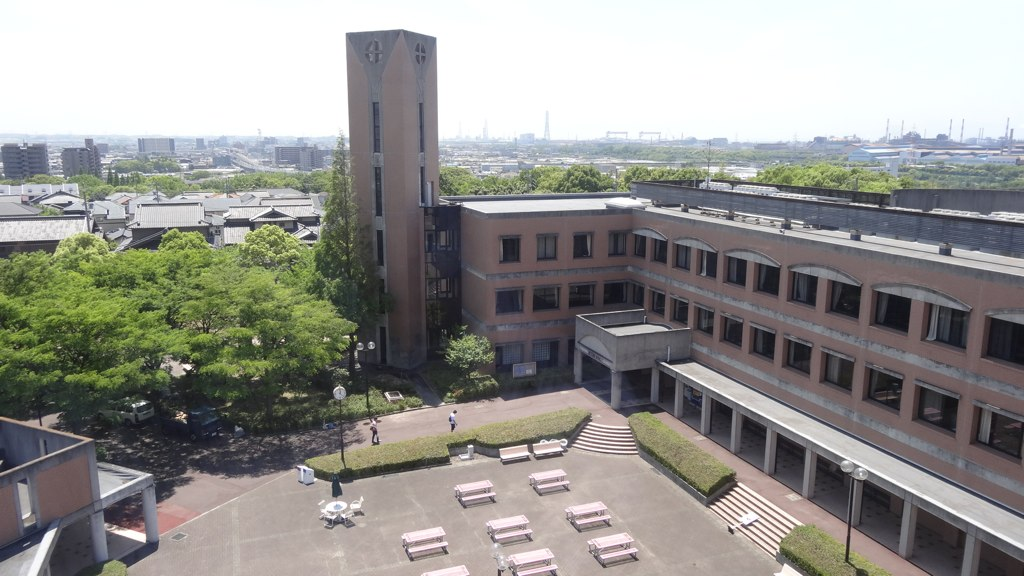
- Type: private
- Established: April 2002
- Location: Tōkai, Aichi, Japan; 35.033°N 136.901°E
- Website: www.seijoh-u.ac.jp/english/index.html

Seijoh University (星城大学, Seijō daigaku) is a private university in Tōkai, Aichi, Japan. The university opened in April 2002 but the predecessor of the school, Ishida Education Group, was founded in 1941. It welcomes international students too.
