= Kabaike Station =

Railway station in Tokoname, Aichi Prefecture, Japan

Kabaike Station 蒲池駅

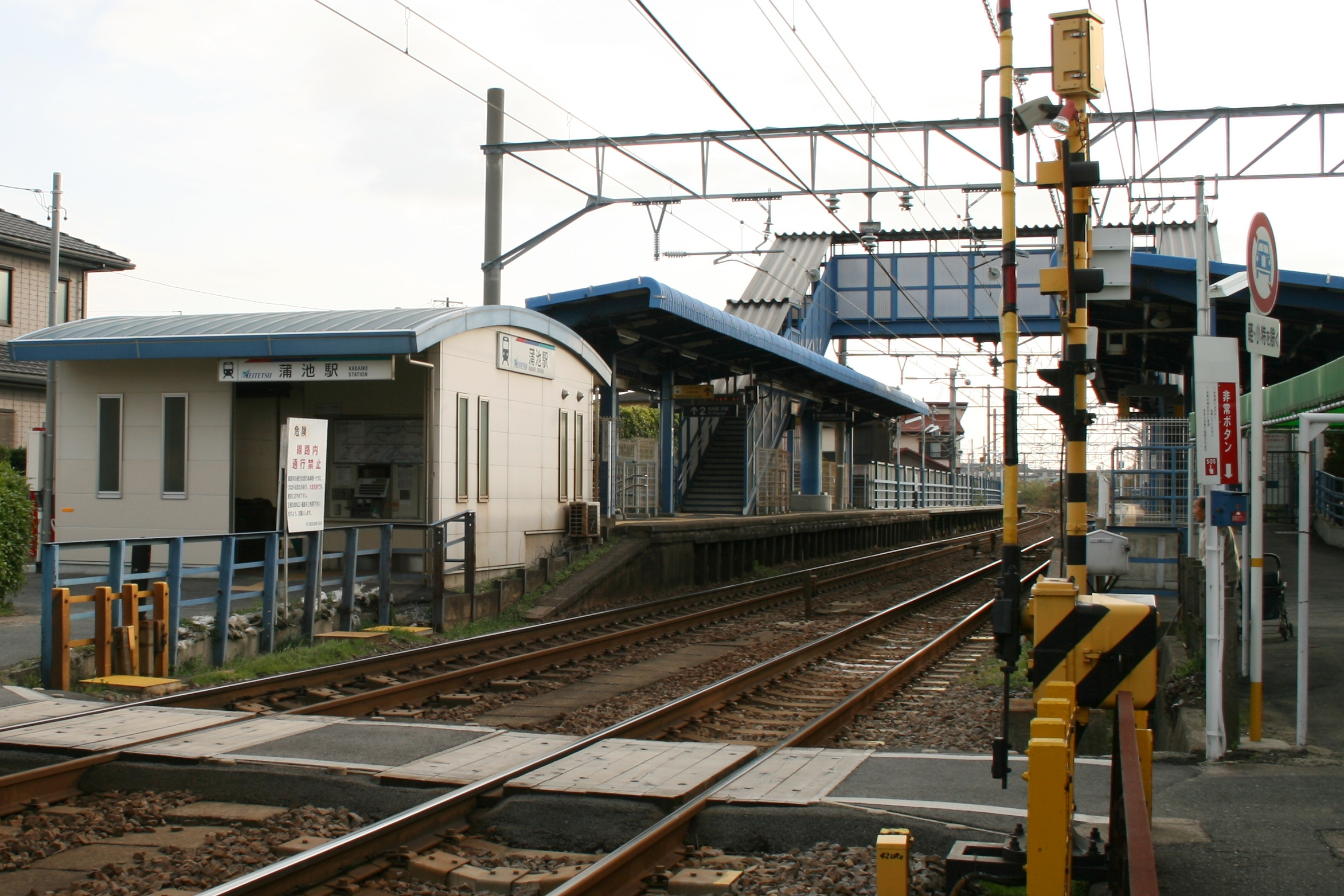
- Kabaike Station in December 2009

General information
- Location: 5 Chome Kabaikecho, Tokoname-shi, Aichi-ken 479-0856; Japan
- Coordinates: 34.9155°N 136.826°E
- Operator: Meitetsu
- Line: ■ Meitetsu Tokoname Line
- Distance: 26.4 kilometers from Jingū-mae
- Platforms: 2 side platforms

Other information
- Status: Unstaffed
- Station code: TA19
- Website: Official website

History
- Opened: June 19, 1913

Passengers
- FY2016: 1,232 daily

Services
Preceding station	Meitetsu	Following station
Enokido towards Central Japan International Airport	Tokoname Line Express (1 train, weekday mornings)	Nishinokuchi One-way operation
Enokido towards Tokoname	Tokoname Line Local	Nishinokuchi towards Jingū-mae
Location
- Location within Aichi Prefecture Location within Japan

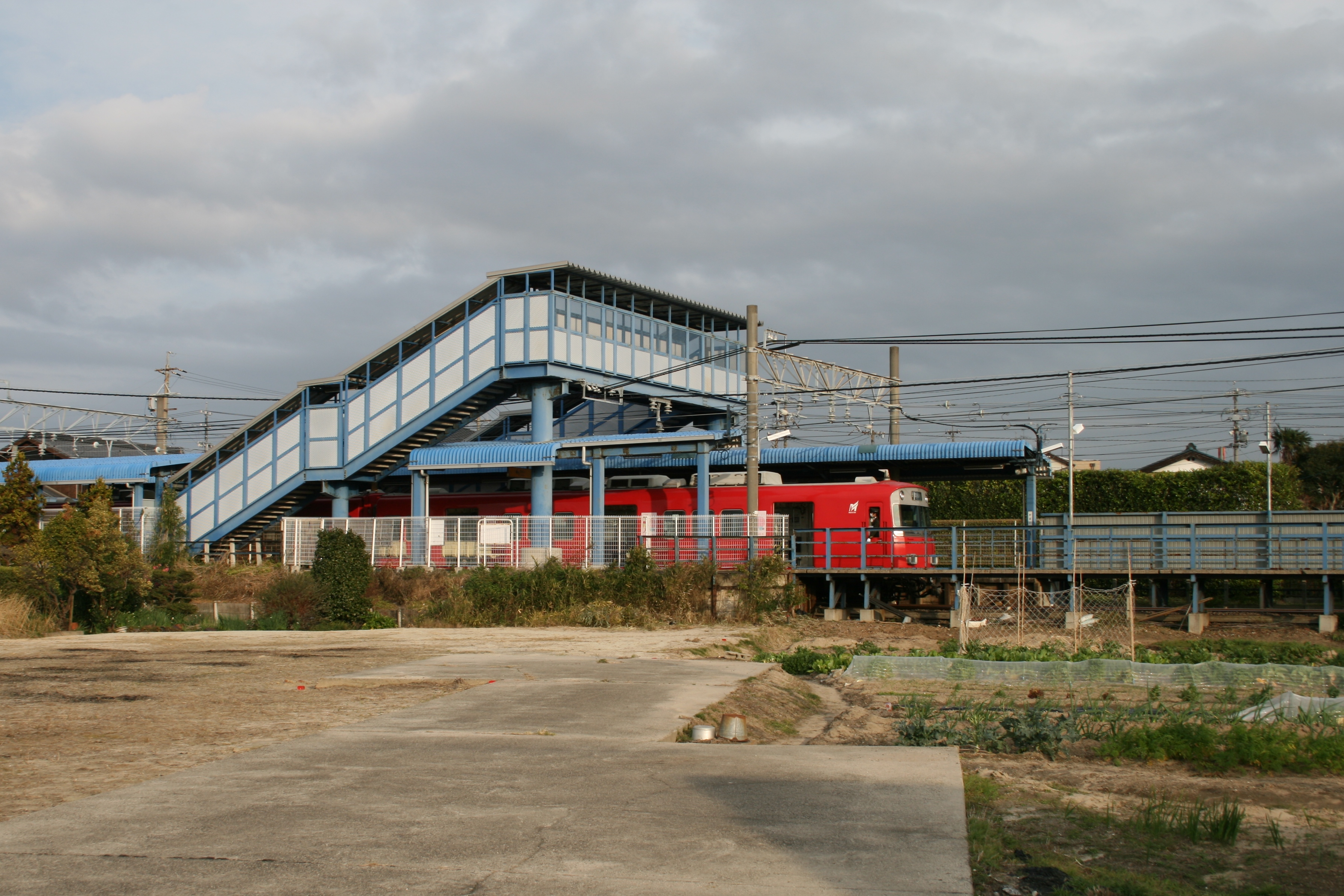
Footbridge

Kabaike Station (蒲池駅, Kabaike-eki) is a railway station in the city of Tokoname, Aichi, Japan, operated by Meitetsu.

== Lines ==
Kabaike Station is served by the Meitetsu Tokoname Line, and is located 26.4 kilometers from the starting point of the line at Jingū-mae.

== Station layout ==
The station has two opposed side platforms connected by a footbridge. The station has automated ticket machines, Manaca automated turnstiles and it is unattended.

=== Platforms ===
1	■ Tokoname Line	For Tokoname and Central Japan International Airport
2	■ Tokoname Line	For Ōtagawa and Jingū-mae

== Station history ==
Kabaike Station was opened on June 19, 1913 as a station on the Aichi Electric Railway Company. The Aichi Electric Railway became part of the Meitetsu group on August 1, 1935. The station has been unattended since February 1968. In January 2005, the Tranpass system of magnetic fare cards with automatic turnstiles was implemented.

== Passenger statistics ==
In fiscal 2016, the station was used by an average of 1,232 passengers daily (boarding passengers only).

== Surrounding area ==
- Tokoname High School

== See also ==
- List of railway stations in Japan
