= Ōnomachi Station =

Railway station in Tokoname, Aichi Prefecture, Japan

Ōnomachi Station 大野町駅

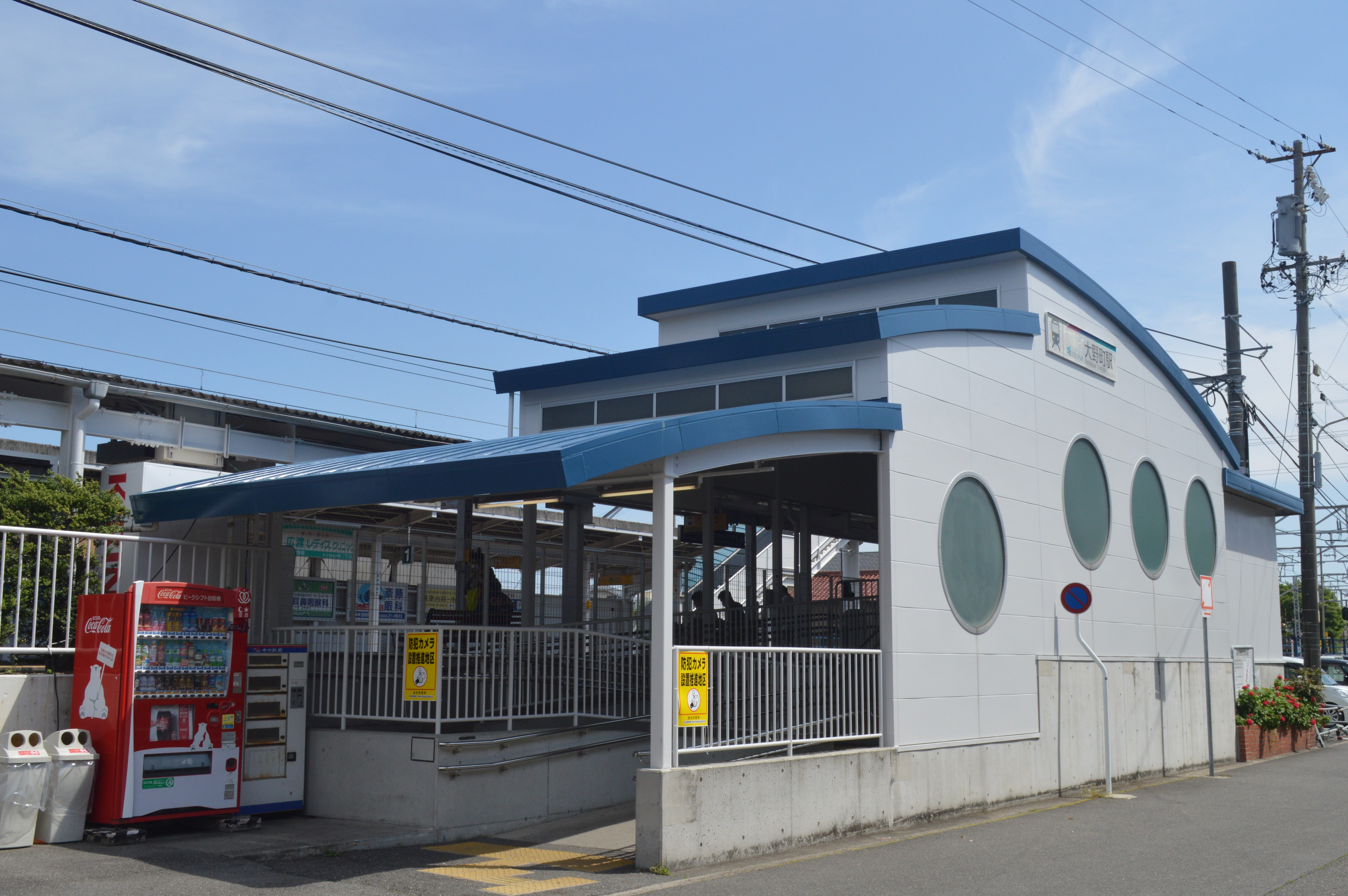
- Ōnomachi Station, 2020

General information
- Location: 5-chōme-170 Ōnochō, Tokoname-shi, Aichi-ken 479-0866; Japan
- Coordinates: 34.9355°N 136.8276°E
- Operator: Meitetsu
- Line: ■ Meitetsu Tokoname Line
- Distance: 24.1 kilometers from Jingū-mae
- Platforms: 2 side platforms

Other information
- Status: Unstaffed
- Station code: TA17
- Website: Official website

History
- Opened: February 18, 1912
- Former names: Ōno (to 1920)

Passengers
- FY2016: 2,421 daily
Location
- Location within Aichi Prefecture Location within Japan

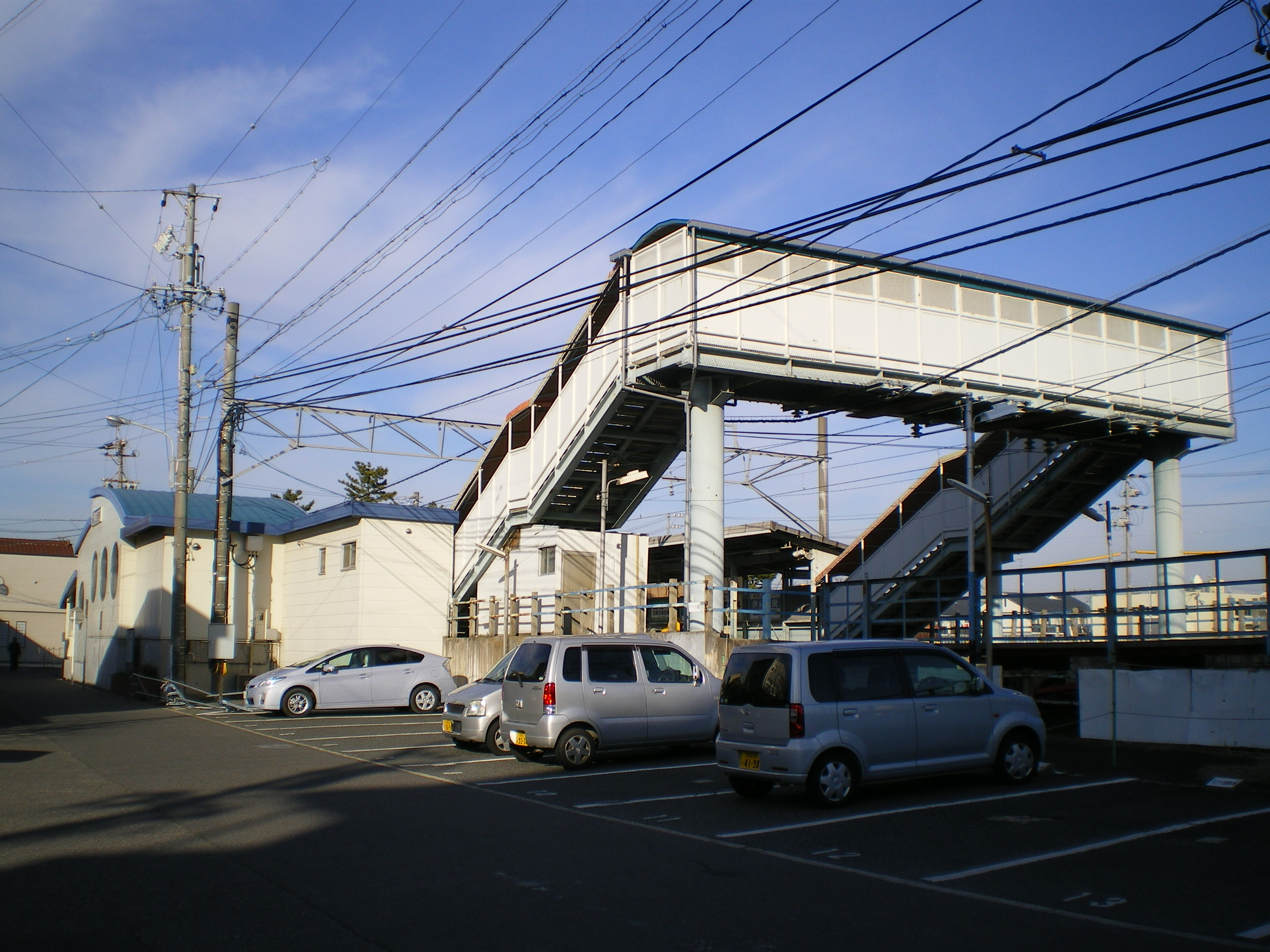
Footbridge

Ōnomachi Station (大野町駅, Ōnomachi-eki) is a railway station in the city of Tokoname, Aichi, Japan, operated by Meitetsu.

== Lines ==
Ōnomachi Station is served by the Meitetsu Tokoname Line, and is located 24.1 kilometers from the starting point of the line at Jingū-mae.

== Station layout ==
The station has two opposed side platforms connected by a footbridge. The station has automated ticket machines, Manaca automated turnstiles and it is unattended.

=== Platforms ===
1	■ Tokoname Line	For Tokoname and Central Japan International Airport
2	■ Tokoname Line	For Ōtagawa and Jingū-mae

== Adjacent stations ==
←	Service	→
Meitetsu Tokoname Line
μSKY Limited Express: Does not stop at this station
Limited Express: Does not stop at this station
Rapid Express: Does not stop at this station
Shin Maiko	Express	Nishinokuchi; Tokoname
Shin Maiko	Semi-Express	Tokoname
Shin Maiko	Local	Nishinokuchi

== Station history ==
Ōnomachi Station was opened on February 18, 1912 as Ōno Station (大野町駅, Ōno-eki) on the Aichi Electric Railway Company. It was renamed to its present name before 1920. The Aichi Electric Railway became part of the Meitetsu group on August 1, 1935. In January 2005, the Tranpass system of magnetic fare cards with automatic turnstiles was implemented.

== Passenger statistics ==
In fiscal 2016, the station was used by an average of 2,421 passengers daily (boarding passengers only).

== Surrounding area ==
- Sainen-ji
- Ōno beach

== See also ==
- List of railway stations in Japan
