= Teramoto Station =

Railway station in Chita, Aichi Prefecture, Japan

Teramoto Station 寺本駅

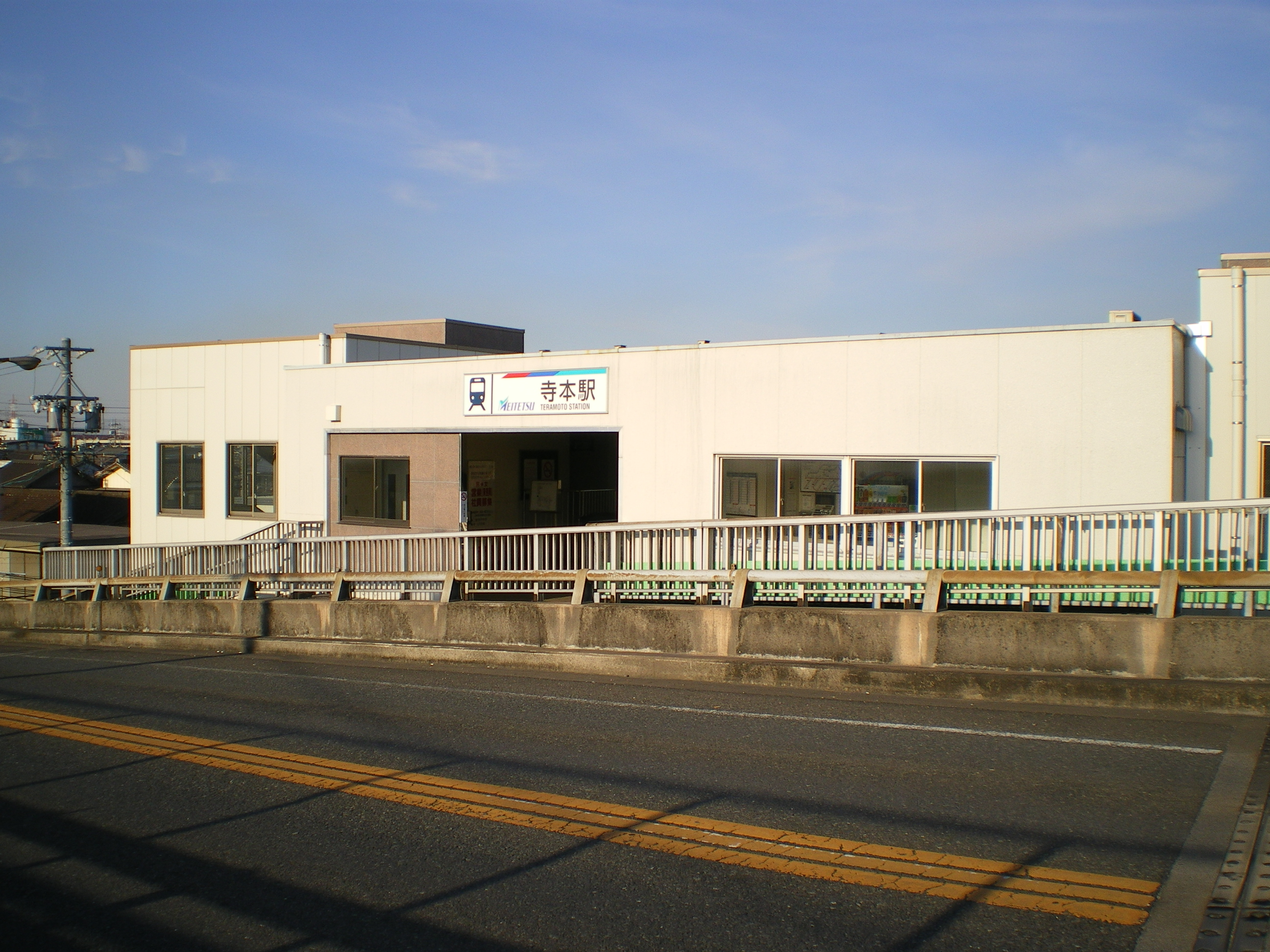
- Teramoto Station in February 2010

General information
- Location: Nishimizushiro-135-2 Yawata, Chita-shi, Aichi-ken 478-0001; Japan
- Coordinates: 35.0004°N 136.8753°E
- Operator: Meitetsu
- Line: ■ Meitetsu Tokoname Line
- Distance: 15.1 kilometers from Jingū-mae
- Platforms: 2 side platforms

Other information
- Status: Unstaffed
- Station code: TA11
- Website: Official website

History
- Opened: February 18, 1912

Passengers
- FY2017: 3721 daily
Location
- Location within Aichi Prefecture Location within Japan

Teramoto Station (寺本駅, Teramoto-eki) is a railway station in the city of Chita, Aichi, Japan, operated by Meitetsu.

== Lines ==
Teramoto Station is served by the Meitetsu Tokoname Line, and is located 15.1 kilometers from the starting point of the line at Jingū-mae.

== Station layout ==
The station has dual opposed side platforms connected by an elevated station building located above then platforms and tracks. The station is unattended.

=== Platforms ===
1	■ Tokoname Line	For Tokoname and Central Japan International Airport
2	■ Tokoname Line	For Ōtagawa and Jingū-mae

== Adjacent stations ==
←	Service	→
Tokoname Line
μSKY Limited Express: Does not stop at this station
Limited Express: Does not stop at this station
Rapid Express: Does not stop at this station
Owari Yokosuka	Express	Asakura
Owari Yokosuka	Semi-Express	Asakura
Owari Yokosuka	Local	Asakura

== Station history ==
Teramoto Station was opened on February 18, 1912 as a station on the Aichi Electric Railway Company. The Aichi Electric Railway became part of the Meitetsu group on August 1, 1935. The station building was reconstructed in March 1982. The station has been unattended since December 2004.

== Passenger statistics ==
In fiscal 2017, the station was used by an average of 3,721 passengers daily (boarding passengers only).

== Surrounding area ==
- Chita Sports Park

== See also ==
- List of railway stations in Japan
