= Nishinokuchi Station =

Railway station in Tokoname, Aichi Prefecture, Japan

Nishinokuchi Station 西ノ口駅

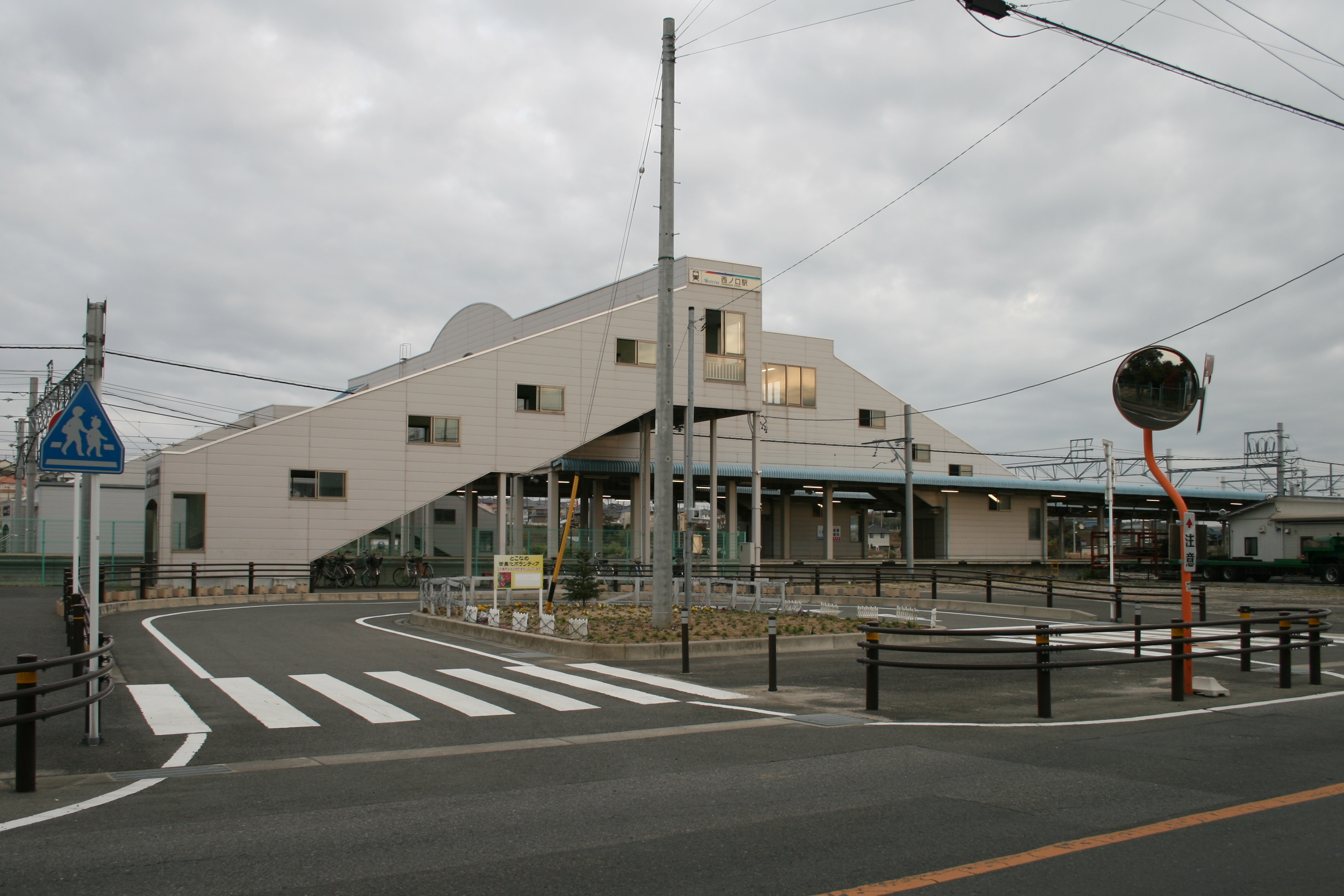
- Nishinokuchi Station in December 2009

General information
- Location: 4-13 Sumiyoshichō, Tokoname-shi, Aichi-ken 479-0864; Japan
- Coordinates: 34.9266°N 136.8265°E
- Operator: Meitetsu
- Line: ■ Meitetsu Tokoname Line
- Distance: 25.4 kilometers from Jingū-mae
- Platforms: 2 island platforms

Other information
- Status: Unstaffed
- Station code: TA18
- Website: Official website

History
- Opened: March 29, 1913

Passengers
- FY2016: 859 daily

Services
Preceding station	Meitetsu	Following station
Kabaike towards Central Japan International Airport	Tokoname Line Express (2 trains, weekday mornings)	Ōnomachi One-way operation
Tokoname towards Central Japan International Airport	Tokoname Line Express (2 trains, weekday mornings)	Ōnomachi One-way operation
Kabaike towards Tokoname	Tokoname Line Local	Ōnomachi towards Jingū-mae
Location
- Location within Aichi Prefecture Location within Japan

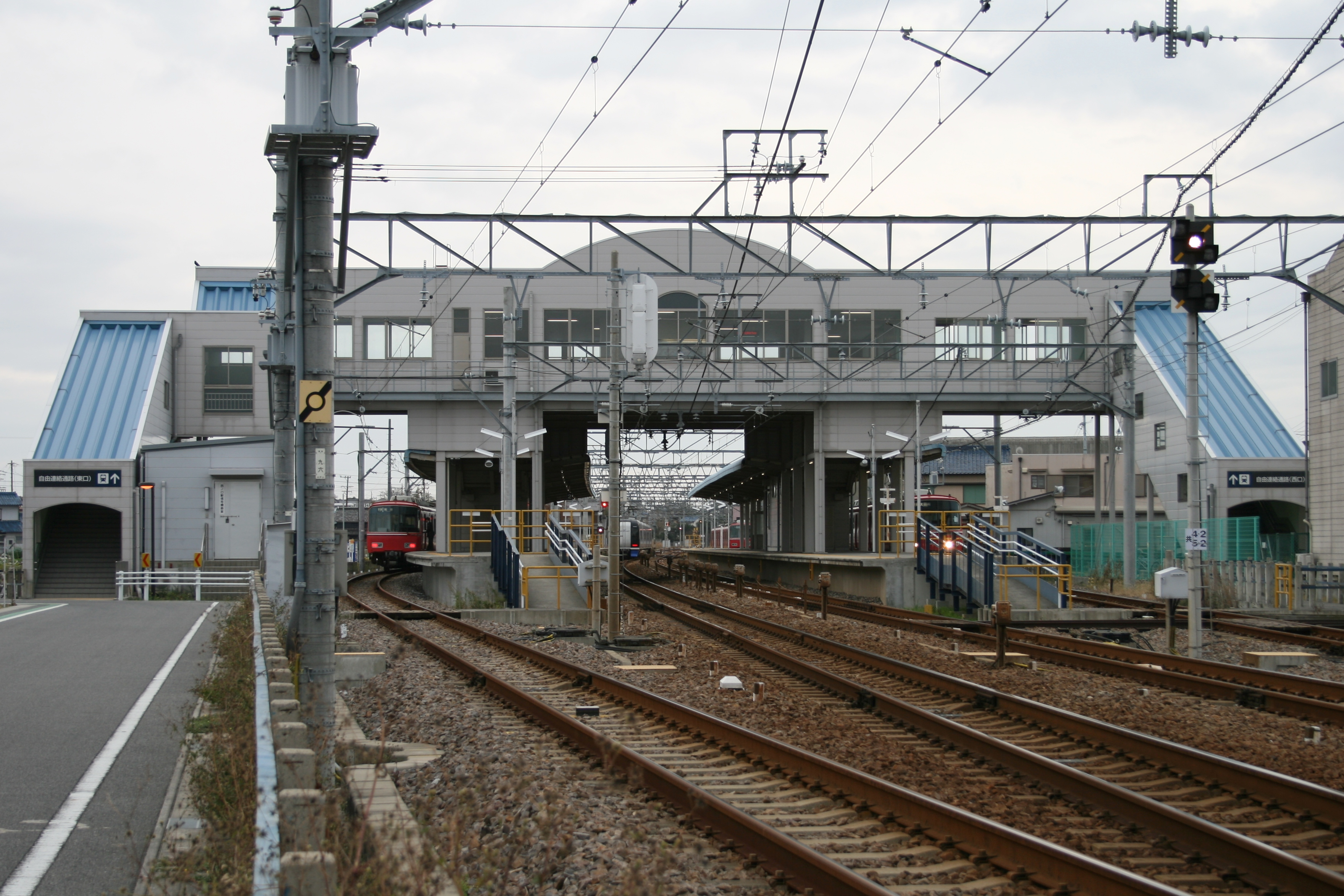
Footbridge

Track layout

Nishinokuchi Station (西ノ口駅, Nishinokuchi-eki) is a railway station in the city of Tokoname, Aichi, Japan, operated by Meitetsu.

== Lines ==
Nishinokuchi Station is served by the Meitetsu Tokoname Line. It is located 25.4 kilometers from the starting point of the line at Jingū-mae.

== Station layout ==
The station has two island platforms connected by a footbridge. The station has automated ticket machines, Manaca automated turnstiles and it is unattended.

=== Platforms ===
1	■ Tokoname Line	for Tokoname and Central Japan International Airport
2	■ Tokoname Line	for Tokoname and Central Japan International Airport
3	■ Tokoname Line	for Ōtagawa and Jingū-mae
4	■ Tokoname Line	for Ōtagawa and Jingū-mae

== Station history ==
Nishinokuchi Station was opened on March 29, 1913 as a station on the Aichi Electric Railway Company. The Aichi Electric Railway became part of the Meitetsu group on August 1, 1935. The station was closed in 1944, but was reopened on September 15, 1946. In December 2004, the platforms were extended to be able to handle trains with a length of six carriages. In January 2005, the Tranpass system of magnetic fare cards with automatic turnstiles was implemented.

== Passenger statistics ==
In fiscal 2016, the station was used by an average of 859 passengers daily (boarding passengers only).

== Surrounding area ==
- Ōno Castle

== See also ==
- List of railway stations in Japan
