= Enokido Station (Aichi) =

Railway station in Tokoname, Aichi Prefecture, Japan

Enokido Station 榎戸駅

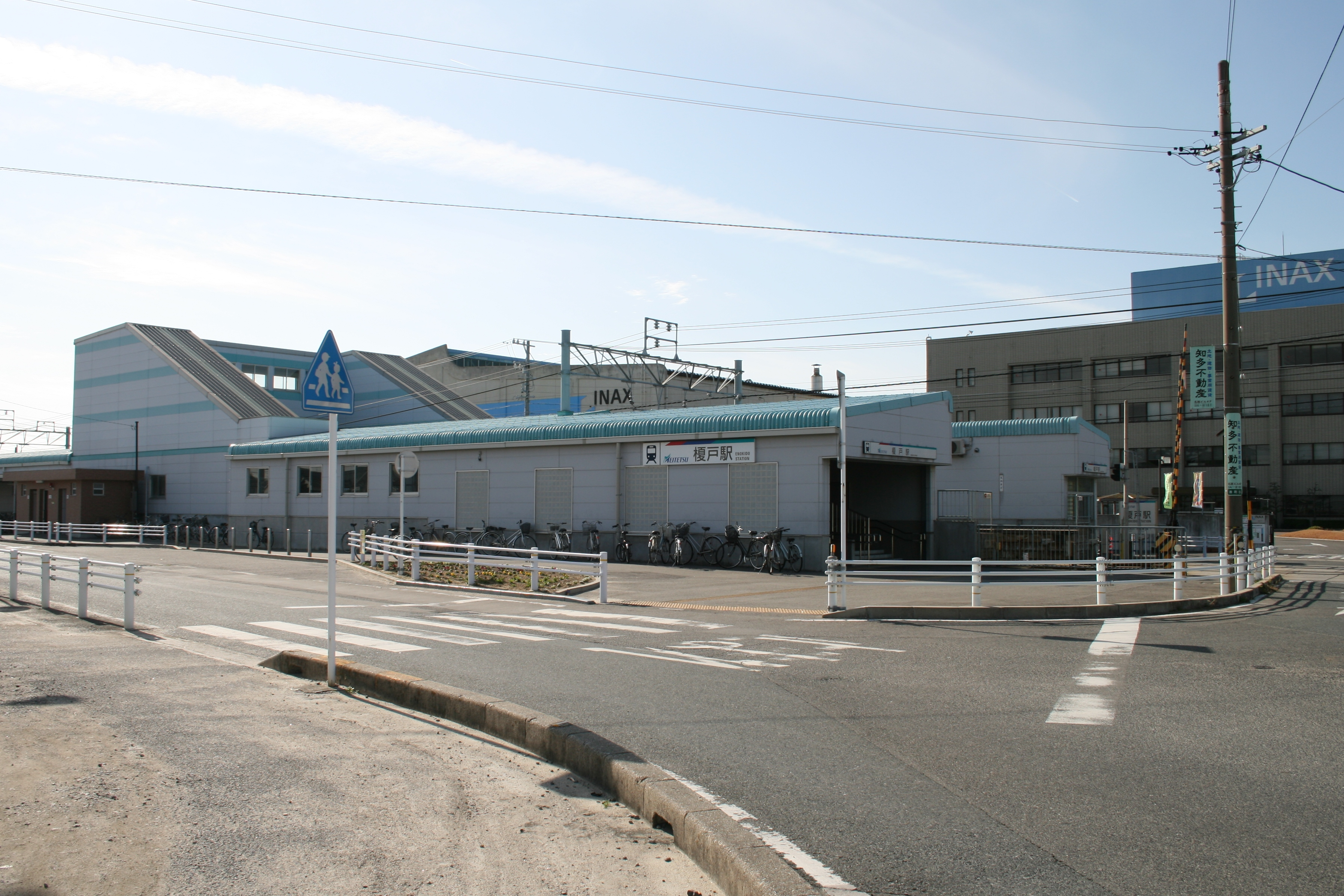
- Enokido Station in February 2019

General information
- Location: 6 Chome Minatocho, Tokoname-shi, Aichi-ken 479-0848; Japan
- Coordinates: 34.905°N 136.828°E
- Operator: Meitetsu
- Line: ■ Tokoname Line
- Distance: 27.5 kilometers from Jingū-mae
- Platforms: 2 side platforms

Other information
- Status: Unstaffed
- Station code: TA20
- Website: Official website

History
- Opened: November 18, 1944

Passengers
- FY2016: 1591 daily

Services
Preceding station	Meitetsu	Following station
Tokoname towards Central Japan International Airport	Tokoname Line Express (1 train, weekday mornings)	Kabaike One-way operation
Taya towards Tokoname	Tokoname Line Local	Kabaike towards Jingū-mae
Location
- Location within Aichi Prefecture Location within Japan

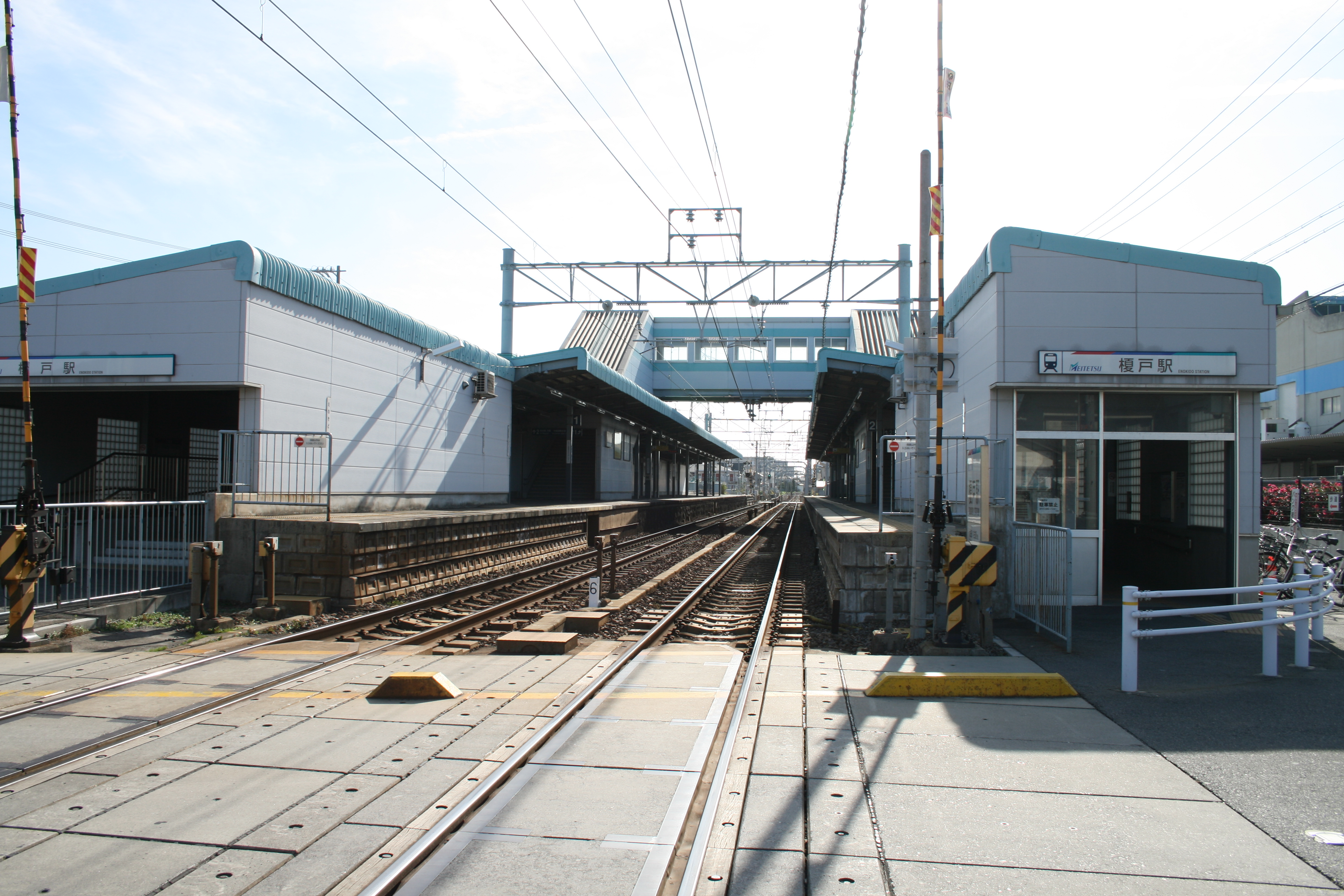
Tracks

Enokido Station (榎戸駅, Enokido-eki) is a railway station in the city of Tokoname, Aichi, Japan, operated by Meitetsu.

== Lines ==
Enokido Station is served by the Meitetsu Tokoname Line, and is located 27.5 kilometers from the starting point of the line at Jingū-mae.

== Station layout ==
The station has two opposed side platforms connected by a footbridge. The station has automated ticket machines, Manaca automated turnstiles and it is unattended.

=== Platforms ===
1	■ Tokoname Line	For Tokoname and Central Japan International Airport
2	■ Tokoname Line	For Ōtagawa and Jingū-mae

== Station history ==
Enokido Station was opened on November 18, 1944. It has been unattended since June 1974. In January 2002, the tracks were elevated and the station building was reconstructed. In January 2005, the Tranpass system of magnetic fare cards with automatic turnstiles was implemented.

== Passenger statistics ==
In fiscal 2016, the station was used by an average of 1,591 passengers daily (boarding passengers only).

== Surrounding area ==
- LIXIL Tokoname plant

== See also ==
- List of railway stations in Japan
