= Enokido Station =

Enokido Station (榎戸駅) is the name of two train stations in Japan:

- Enokido Station (Aichi)
- Enokido Station (Chiba)
