= Teramoto =

Teramoto is a Japanese surname. Notable people with the surname include:

- Asuka Teramoto (寺本 明日香, born 1995), Japanese Olympic gymnast
- Kumaichi Teramoto (寺本 熊市, 1889–1945), Japanese Lieutenant General
- Rio Teramoto (寺本 莉緒, born 2001), Japanese Gravure idol and actress
- Yukika Teramoto (寺本 來可, born 1993), Japanese actress

== See also ==
- Teramoto Station, a railway station in Chita, Aichi Prefecture, Japan
