= Shōjū-in, Tokoname =

Buddhist temple in Tokoname, Aichi, Japan

Coordinates: 34.879343°N 136.841672°E

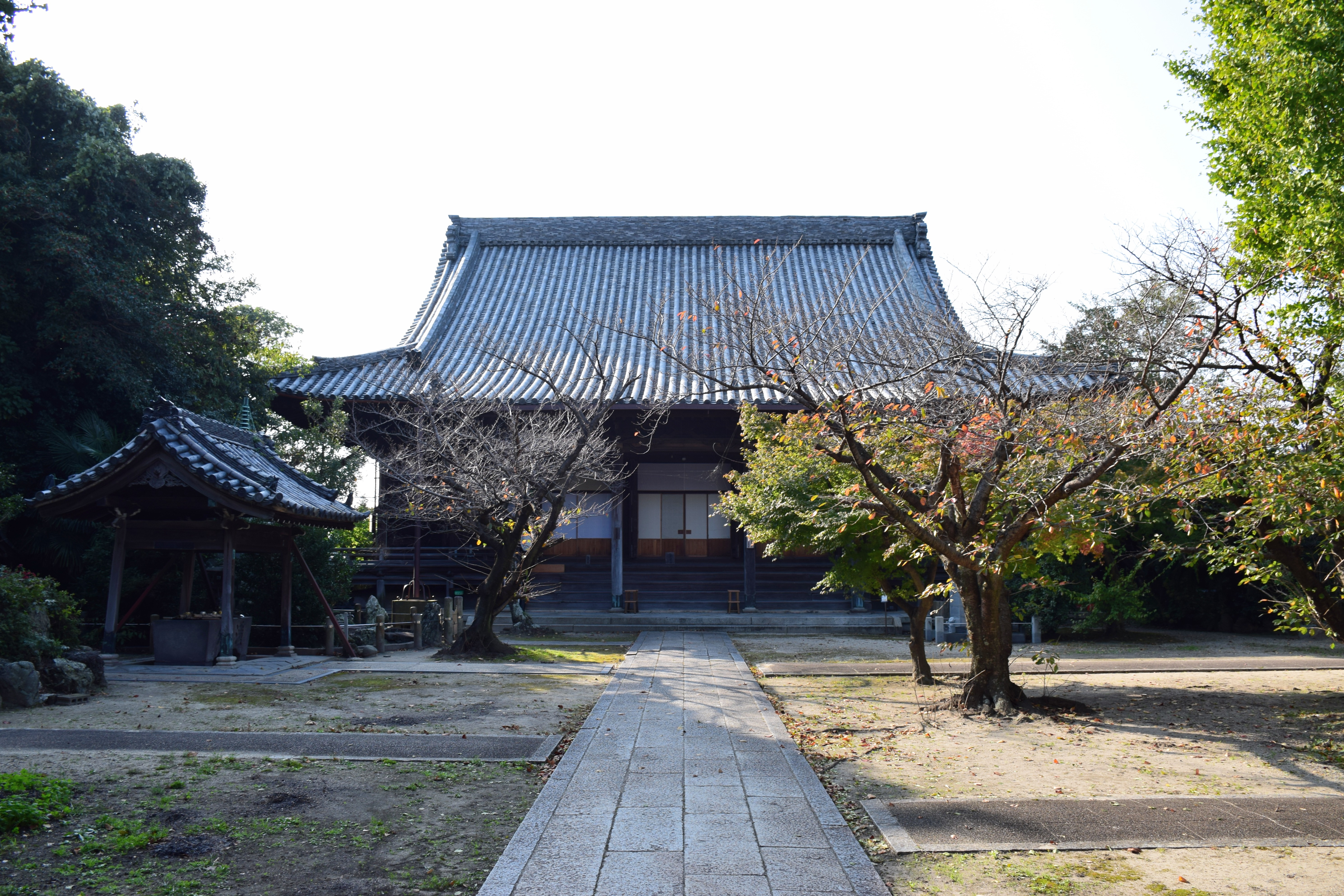
Main hall of the Shōjū-in

Shōjū-in (正住院) is a Buddhist temple of the Jōdo-shū, located in Tokoname, Aichi Prefecture, central Japan.
