= Meitetsu Tokoname Line =

Railway line in Aichi Prefecture, Japan

Tokoname Line

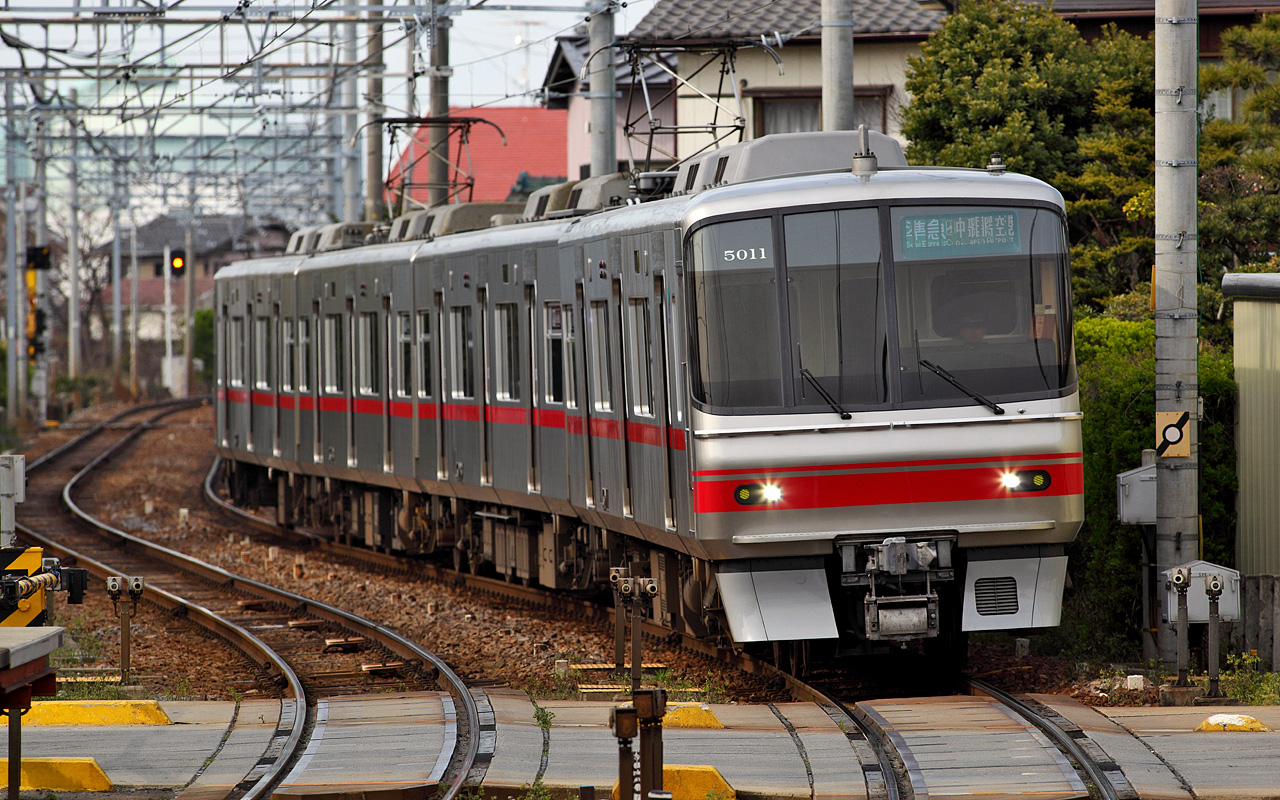
- A Meitetsu 5000 series EMU at Shin Maiko Station

Overview
- Native name: 常滑線
- Status: In service
- Owner: Nagoya Railroad Co., Ltd.
- Line number: TA
- Locale: Aichi Prefecture
- Termini: Jingū-mae; Tokoname
- Stations: 23

Service
- Type: Commuter rail
- System: Meitetsu
- Operator(s): Nagoya Railroad Co., Ltd.
- Daily ridership: 54,177 (2008)

History
- Opened: August 13, 1913; 113 years ago

Technical
- Line length: 29.3 km (18.2 mi)
- Track gauge: 1,067 mm (3 ft 6 in)
- Electrification: 1,500 V DC, overhead catenary
- Operating speed: 120 km/h (75 mph)

The Tokoname Line (常滑線, Tokoname-sen) is a railway line in Aichi Prefecture, Japan, operated by the private railway operator Meitetsu (Nagoya Railroad), connecting Jingū-mae Station in Nagoya and Tokoname Station in Tokoname.

== Stations ==
● L: Local (普通, futsū)
● S: Semi Express (準急, junkyū)
● E: Express (急行, kyūkō)
● R: Rapid Express (快速急行, kaisoku kyūkō)
● L: Limited Express (特急, tokkyū)
● MU: μSKY Limited Express (ミュースカイ, myū sukai)

All trains stop at stations marked "●" and pass stations marked "|". Some trains stop at "▲".

| No. | Station name | Japanese | Distance (km) | L | S | E | R | L | MU | Transfers | Location | |
|---|---|---|---|---|---|---|---|---|---|---|---|---|
| NH33 | Jingū-mae | 神宮前 | 0.0 | ● | ● | ● | ● | ● | ● | Nagoya Main Line (NH33) | Atsuta-ku, Nagoya | Aichi |
| TA01 | Toyodahommachi | 豊田本町 | 1.4 | ● | | | | | | | | | | | | Minami-ku, Nagoya | Aichi |
| TA02 | Dōtoku | 道徳 | 2.4 | ● | | | | | | | | | | | | Minami-ku, Nagoya | Aichi |
| TA03 | Ōe | 大江 | 3.8 | ● | ● | ● | ▲ | | | | | Chikkō Line (TA03) | Minami-ku, Nagoya | Aichi |
| TA04 | Daidōchō | 大同町 | 5.3 | ● | ● | ▲ | | | | | | | | Minami-ku, Nagoya | Aichi |
| TA05 | Shibata | 柴田 | 6.1 | ● | ▲ | | | | | | | | | | Minami-ku, Nagoya | Aichi |
| TA06 | Nawa | 名和 | 7.5 | ● | | | | | | | | | | | | Tōkai | Aichi |
| TA07 | Shūrakuen | 聚楽園 | 9.7 | ● | ● | ▲ | ▲ | | | | | | Tōkai | Aichi |
| TA08 | Shin Nittetsu-mae | 新日鉄前 | 10.6 | ● | | | | | | | | | | | | Tōkai | Aichi |
| TA09 | Ōtagawa | 太田川 | 12.3 | ● | ● | ● | ● | ● | ▲ | Kōwa Line (TA09) | Tōkai | Aichi |
| TA10 | Owari Yokosuka | 尾張横須賀 | 13.7 | ● | ● | ● | ● | ● | ▲ | | Tōkai | Aichi |
| TA11 | Teramoto | 寺本 | 15.1 | ● | ● | ● | | | | | | | | Chita | Aichi |
| TA12 | Asakura | 朝倉 | 16.4 | ● | ● | ● | ● | ● | ▲ | | Chita | Aichi |
| TA13 | Komi | 古見 | 17.3 | ● | ● | ● | | | | | | | | Chita | Aichi |
| TA14 | Nagaura | 長浦 | 18.7 | ● | | | | | | | | | | | | Chita | Aichi |
| TA15 | Hinaga | 日長 | 21.0 | ● | | | | | | | | | | | | Chita | Aichi |
| TA16 | Shin Maiko | 新舞子 | 22.5 | ● | ● | ● | ● | ● | ▲ | | Chita | Aichi |
| TA17 | Ōnomachi | 大野町 | 24.1 | ● | ● | ● | | | | | | | | Tokoname | Aichi |
| TA18 | Nishinokuchi | 西ノ口 | 25.4 | ● | | | ▲ | | | | | | | | Tokoname | Aichi |
| TA19 | Kabaike | 蒲池 | 26.4 | ● | | | ▲ | | | | | | | | Tokoname | Aichi |
| TA20 | Enokido | 榎戸 | 27.5 | ● | | | ▲ | | | | | | | | Tokoname | Aichi |
| TA21 | Taya | 多屋 | 28.6 | ● | | | | | | | | | | | | Tokoname | Aichi |
| TA22 | Tokoname | 常滑 | 29.3 | ● | ● | ● | ● | ● | ▲ | Airport Line (TA22) | Tokoname | Aichi |

== History ==
The Aichi Electric Railway opened the Ōno (now Ōnomachi) to Tenma (since closed) section in 1912, electrified at 600 V DC, and extended the line 500 m (1,640 ft) to Jingū-mae and from Ōnomachi to Tokoname the following year. The Ōe to Ōnomachi section was double-tracked between 1920 and 1925, and in 1929, the voltage was increased to 1,500 V DC.

In 1935, the company merged with Meitetsu, and in 1942, the Jingū-mae to Ōe section was double-tracked. The Ōnomachi to Tokoname section was double-tracked between 1962 and 1972.

The section from Enokido to Tokoname was closed from January 2002 to October 2003 for the construction of the Meitetsu Airport Line to Chubu Centrair International Airport. The extension opened in 2005.

== See also ==
- List of railway lines in Japan
