= Tokoname =

Tokoname 常滑市
- City
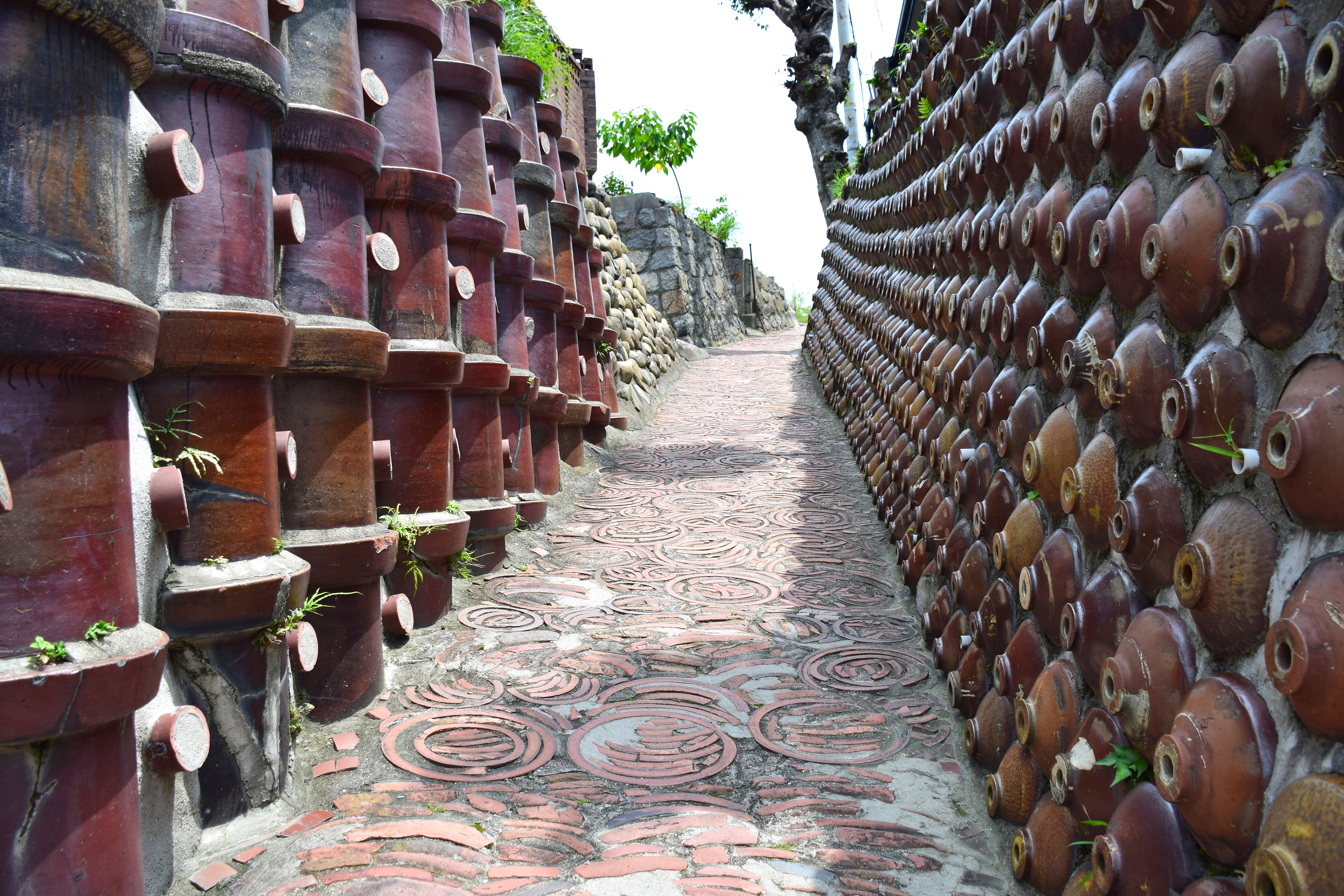
- Tokoname ware tiles

- Flag Emblem

- Location of Tokoname in Aichi Prefecture

- Coordinates: 34°53′11.5″N 136°49′56.4″E
- Country: Japan
- Region: Chūbu (Tōkai)
- Prefecture: Aichi

Government
  - Mayor: Tatsuya Itō

Area
  - Total: 55.90 km^{2} (21.58 sq mi)

Population (October 1, 2019)
  - Total: 57,872
  - Density: 1,035/km^{2} (2,681/sq mi)
- Time zone: UTC+9 (Japan Standard Time)
- Phone number: 0569-35-5111
- Address: 4-1 Shinkai-chō, Tokoname-shi, Aichi-ken 479-0837
- Climate: Cfa
- Website: Official website
- Symbols
- Flower: Camellia sasanqua
- Tree: Japanese Black Pine

Tokoname (常滑市, Tokoname-shi) is a city in Aichi Prefecture, Japan. As of 1 October 2019, the city had an estimated population of 57,872 in 24,872 households, and a population density of 1,035 persons per km^{2}. The total area of the city is 55.90 square kilometres (21.58 sq mi). The city is notable as one of the Six Ancient Kilns of Japan.

== History ==
=== Ancient history ===
Tokoname has been associated with ceramics production since at least the Heian period, and Tokoname-yaki works from this period have been found in locations as far away as Aomori Prefecture in the north of Japan and Kagoshima prefecture in the south.

=== Feudal period ===
By the Kamakura period, over 3000 kilns were active. During the Sengoku period, the area came under the control of the Isshiki clan, and later came under the rule of Oda Nobunaga and Toyotomi Hideyoshi.

=== Early modern period ===
During the Edo period, the area around present-day Tokoname was part of Owari Domain.

=== Late modern period ===
In the post Meiji Restoration cadastral reforms of 1889, the town of Tokoname was created with the establishment of the modern municipalities system.

=== Contemporary history ===
Tokoname was elevated to city status on April 1, 1954, by the merger of Tokoname town with the towns of Onizaki (鬼崎), Nishiura (西浦) and Ōno (大野), and the village of Miwa (三和村).

== Government ==
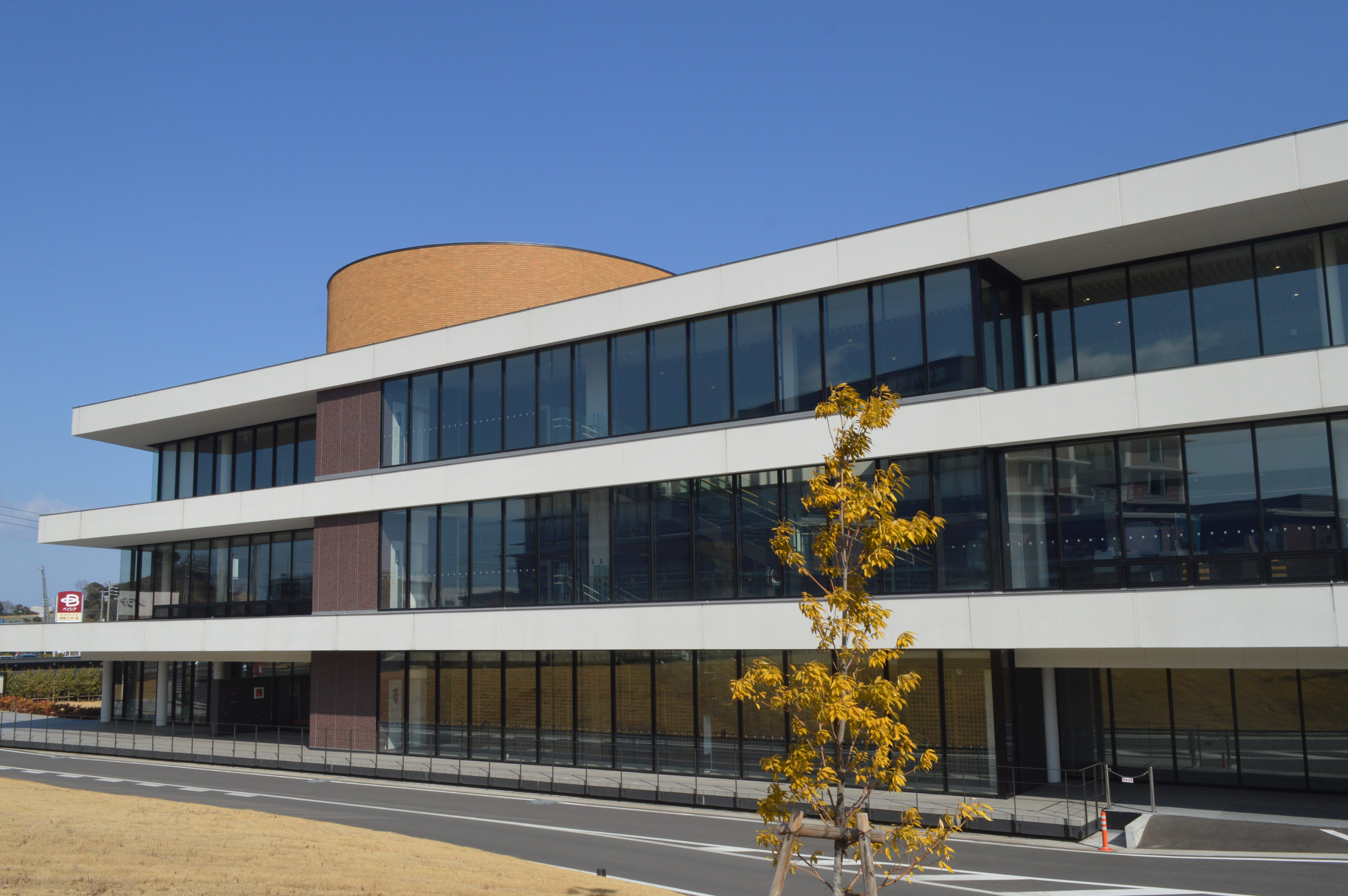
Tokoname city hall

Tokoname has a mayor-council form of government with a directly elected mayor and a unicameral city legislature of 18 members. The city contributes one member to the Aichi Prefectural Assembly. In terms of national politics, the city is part of Aichi District 8 of the lower house of the Diet of Japan.

Chubu Centrair International Airport, built on an artificial island off the coast of Tokoname, opened on February 17, 2005, providing a major boost to local development.

== Economy ==
=== Secondary sector of the economy ===
==== Ceramic engineering ====
Tokoname is a regional commercial center, and has been known since the Heian period for its production of ceramics, notably Tokoname-yaki, and ceramics production remains the mainstay of the local economy. One of the main producing companies is INAX.

About 60 climbing kilns formerly operated, most of which were constructed starting in the Meiji era. The chimneys became a landmark of the town, but many were closed and taken down after the Second World War as production methods modernised and burning of ovens was regulated by the authorities to protect the air quality. The Tōei Kiln (陶栄窯) is a climbing kiln (nobori-gama) that was constructed in 1887 and used until 1974. It is the largest climbing kiln existing in Japan. It was designated as an Important Tangible Cultural Property by the government in 1982. It has eight firing chambers running a 17° incline and ten chimneys of varying height.

With its long coastline, commercial fishing also plays an important role in the local economy.

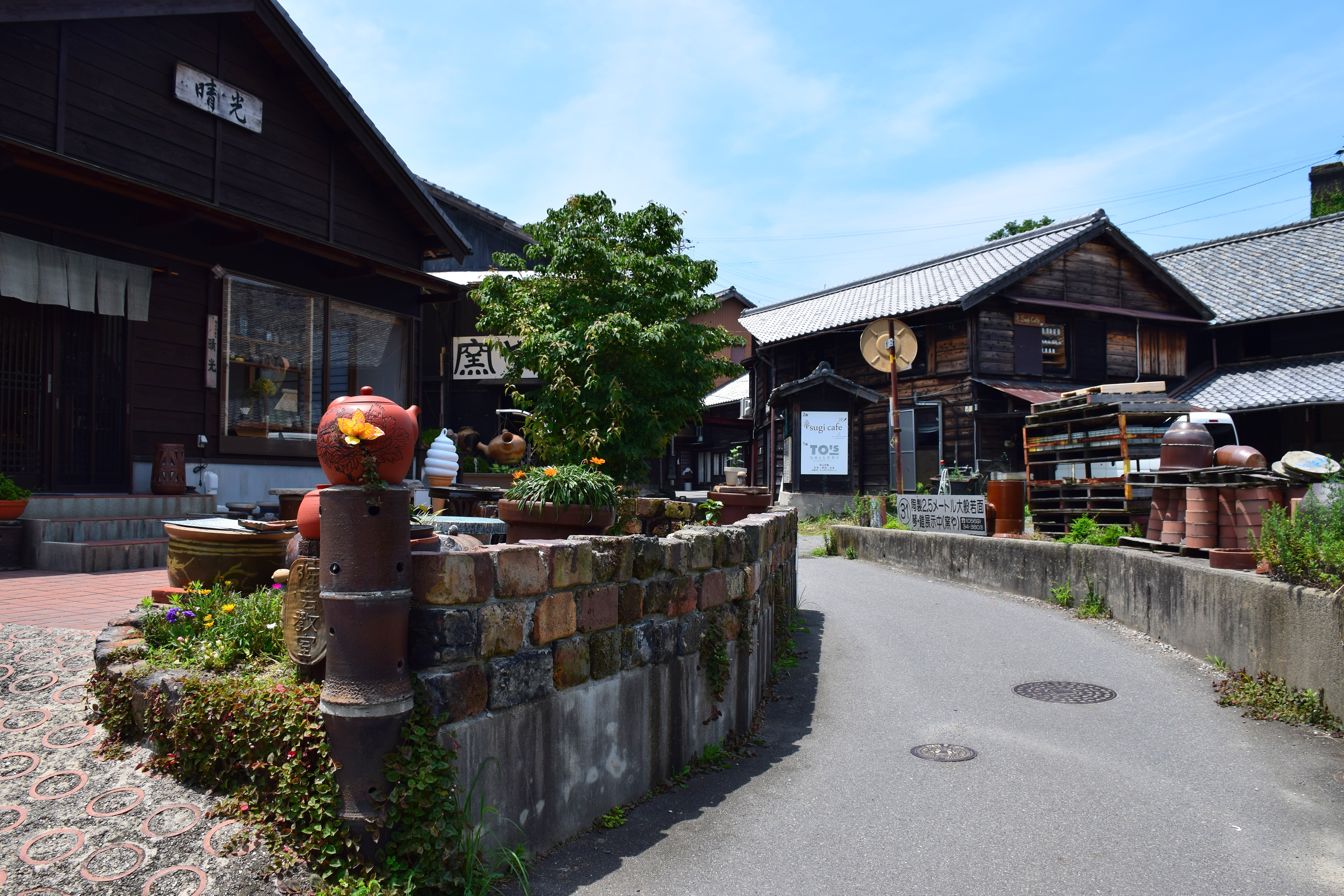
"Pottery Footpath" (Yakimono-sanpomichi)

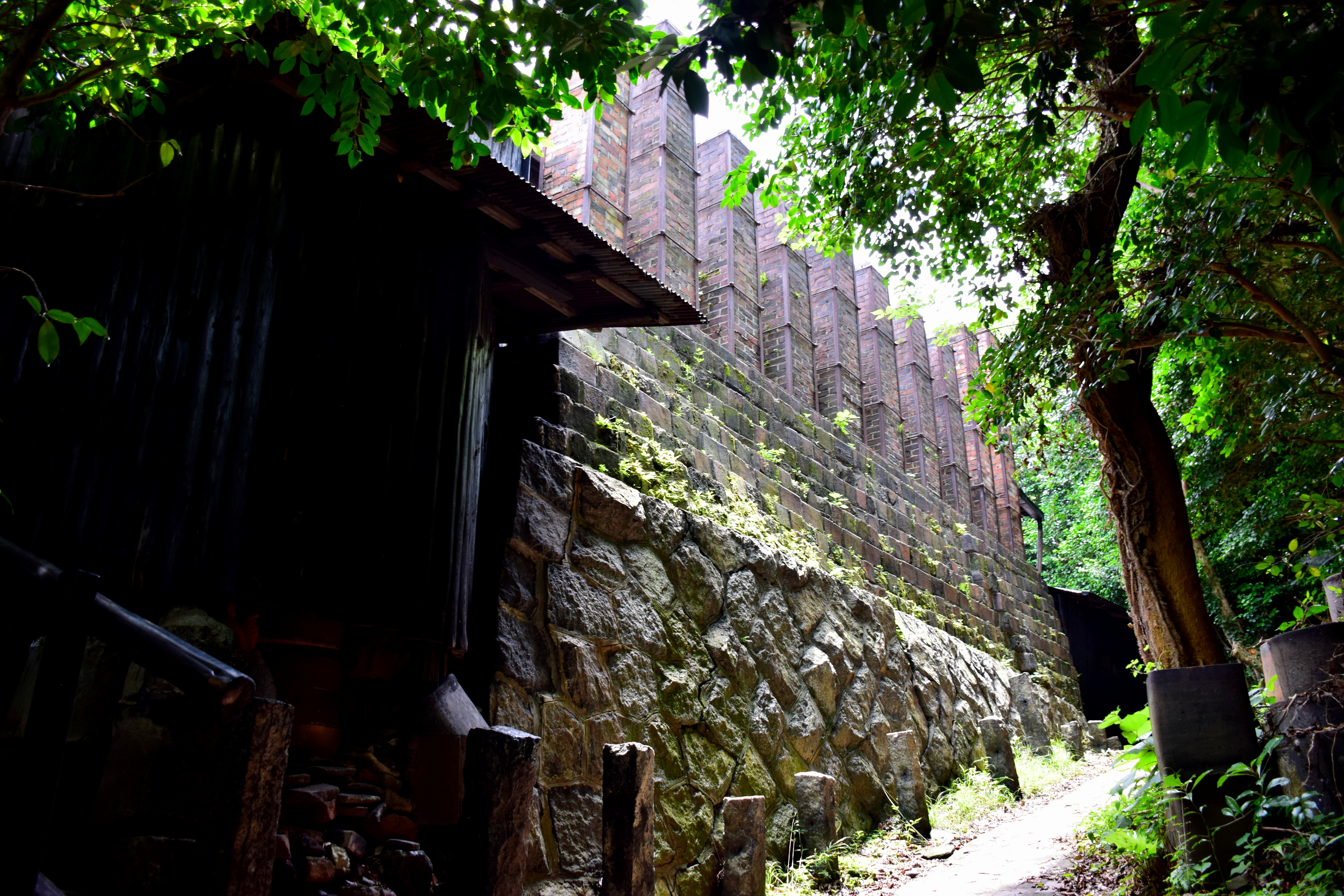
The Tōei kiln, largest climbing kiln (nobori-gama) in Japan

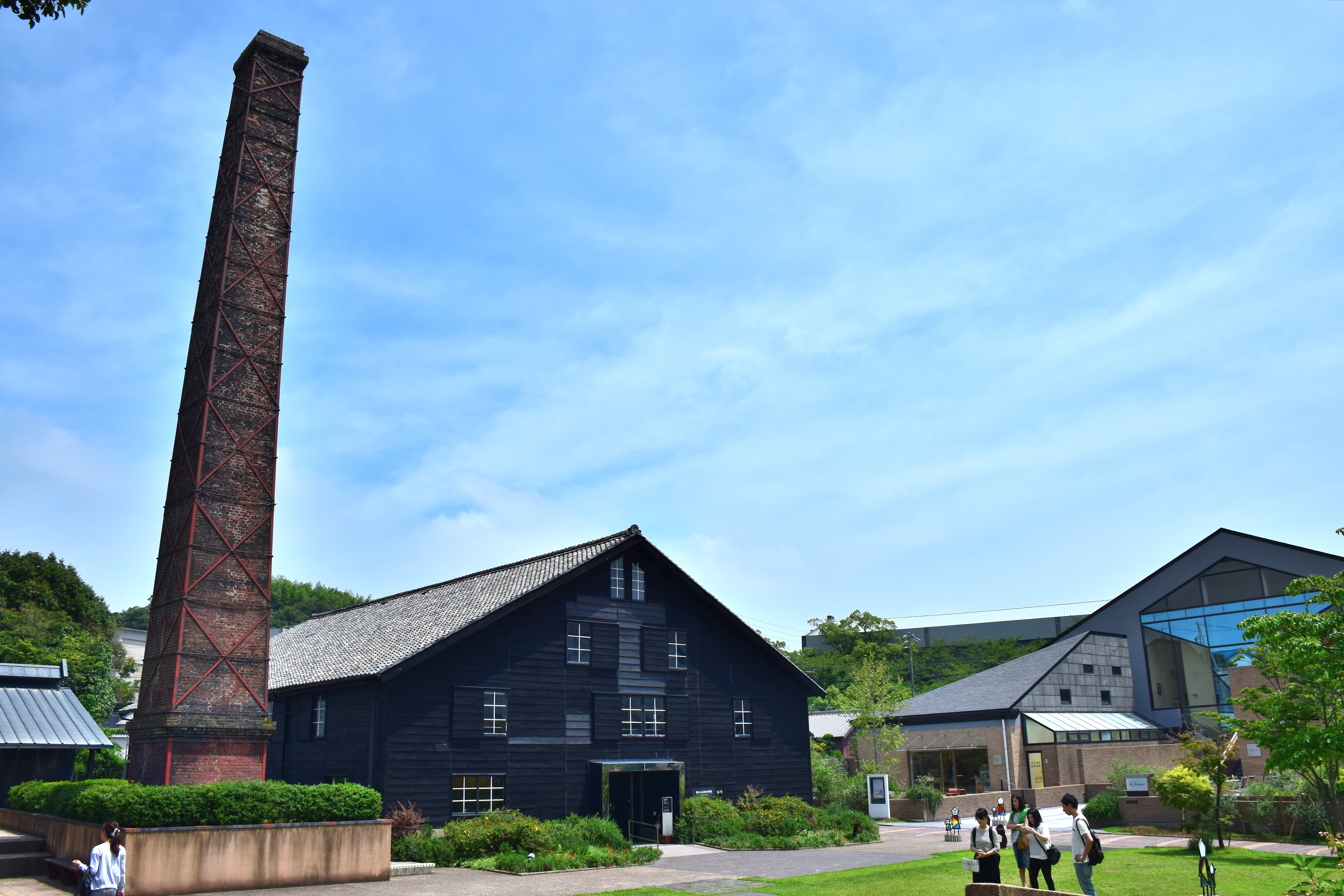
INAX MUSEUMS

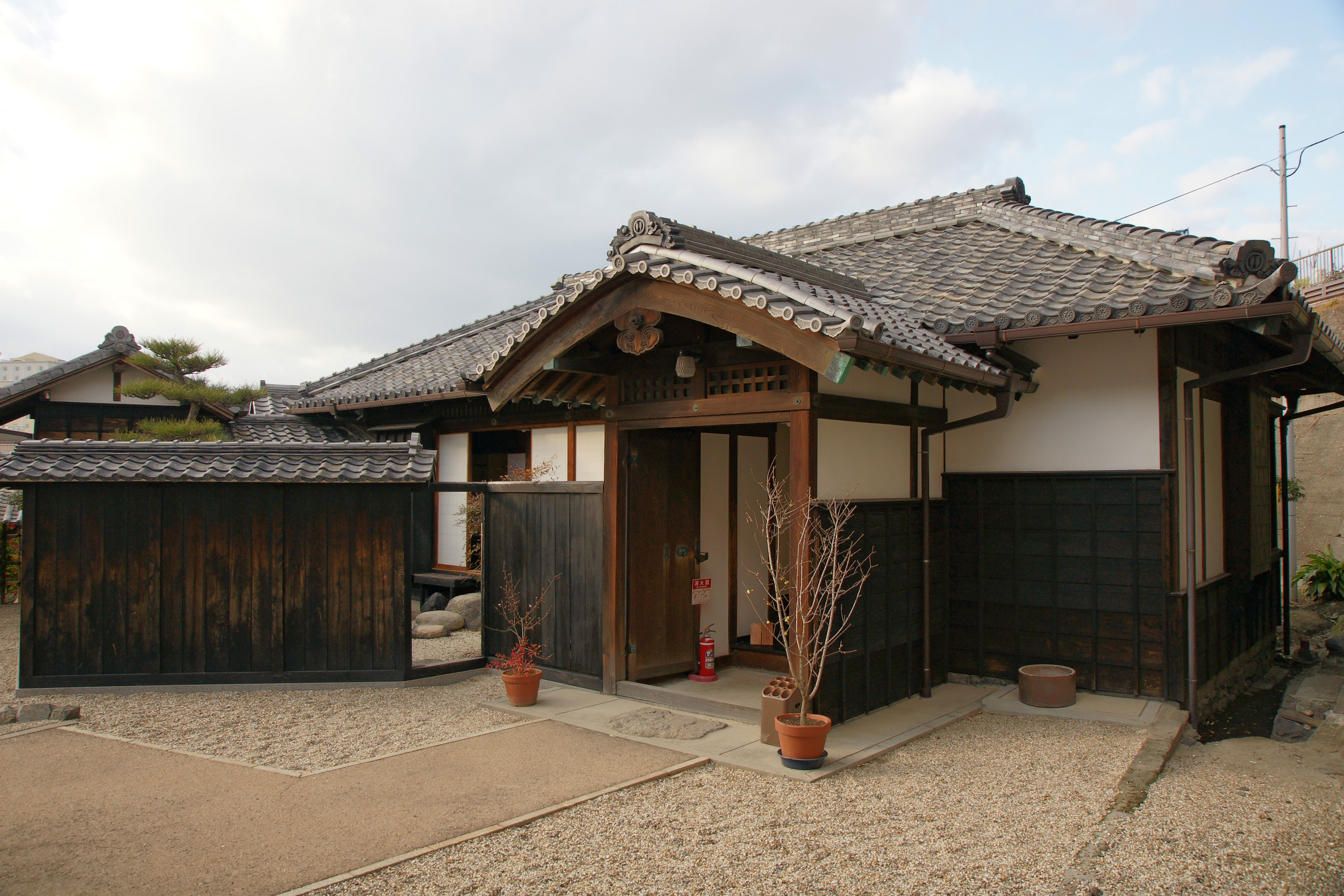
Old residence of the Takita shipping family

== Geography ==
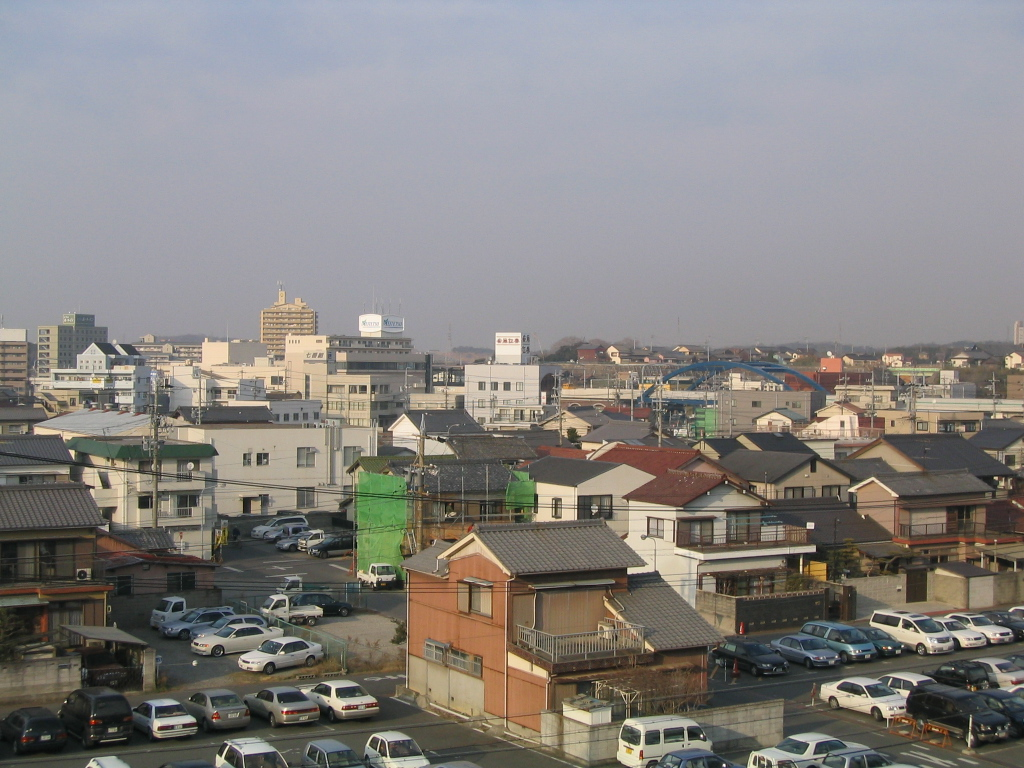
Skyline of Tokoname City

Tokoname is located on the western coast of the Chita Peninsula in southern Aichi Prefecture, facing Ise Bay.

=== Climate ===
The city has a climate characterized by hot and humid summers, and relatively mild winters (Köppen climate classification Cfa). The average annual temperature in Tokoname is 15.5 °C (59.9 °F). The average annual rainfall is 1,674 mm (65.9 in) with September as the wettest month. The temperatures are highest on average in August, at around 27.4 °C (81.3 °F), and lowest in January, at around 4.6 °C (40.3 °F).

Climate data for Chubu Centrair International Airport, Tokoname (2005−2020 normals, extremes 2005−present)
Month	Jan	Feb	Mar	Apr	May	Jun	Jul	Aug	Sep	Oct	Nov	Dec	Year
Record high °C (°F)	16.3 (61.3)	19.6 (67.3)	22.9 (73.2)	27.1 (80.8)	30.3 (86.5)	34.6 (94.3)	36.8 (98.2)	36.1 (97.0)	35.6 (96.1)	30.1 (86.2)	24.3 (75.7)	20.8 (69.4)	36.8 (98.2)
Mean daily maximum °C (°F)	9.1 (48.4)	9.7 (49.5)	13.0 (55.4)	17.9 (64.2)	22.7 (72.9)	25.7 (78.3)	29.3 (84.7)	31.2 (88.2)	27.7 (81.9)	22.6 (72.7)	17.1 (62.8)	11.6 (52.9)	19.8 (67.7)
Daily mean °C (°F)	6.3 (43.3)	6.6 (43.9)	9.3 (48.7)	13.9 (57.0)	18.8 (65.8)	22.5 (72.5)	26.1 (79.0)	27.8 (82.0)	24.6 (76.3)	19.6 (67.3)	14.2 (57.6)	8.8 (47.8)	16.5 (61.8)
Mean daily minimum °C (°F)	3.1 (37.6)	3.2 (37.8)	5.7 (42.3)	10.2 (50.4)	15.4 (59.7)	19.9 (67.8)	23.7 (74.7)	25.2 (77.4)	21.8 (71.2)	16.5 (61.7)	10.7 (51.3)	5.6 (42.1)	13.4 (56.2)
Record low °C (°F)	−3.1 (26.4)	−3.0 (26.6)	−0.6 (30.9)	1.7 (35.1)	8.4 (47.1)	13.7 (56.7)	18.7 (65.7)	19.6 (67.3)	14.0 (57.2)	9.6 (49.3)	3.5 (38.3)	−1.2 (29.8)	−3.1 (26.4)
Average precipitation mm (inches)	42.1 (1.66)	61.3 (2.41)	95.1 (3.74)	112.8 (4.44)	130.4 (5.13)	166.4 (6.55)	164.0 (6.46)	88.3 (3.48)	177.8 (7.00)	179.0 (7.05)	60.8 (2.39)	53.4 (2.10)	1,363.5 (53.68)
Average precipitation days (≥ 1.0 mm)	4.9	6.2	8.3	8.6	9.1	10.8	10.9	7.0	10.4	9.0	6.0	5.8	97
Source: JMA

=== Demographics ===
Per Japanese census data, the population of Tokoname has been relatively steady over the past 50 years.

Historical population
Year	Pop.	±%
1960	51,919	—
1970	54,168	+4.3%
1980	54,343	+0.3%
1990	51,784	−4.7%
2000	50,183	−3.1%
2010	54,858	+9.3%

=== Neighboring municipalities ===
Aichi Prefecture

- Agui
- Chita
- Handa
- Mihama
- Taketoyo

== Sister cities ==
- Yixing, Jiangsu, China, friendship city since April 25, 2018

== Education ==
Tokoname has nine public elementary schools, four public junior high schools operated by the city government, and one public high school operated by the Aichi Prefectural Board of Education.

=== High school ===
- Tokoname Senior High School

=== Junior high schools ===
- Nanryo Junior High School
- Onizaki Junior High School
- Seikai Junior High School
- Tokoname Junior High School

=== Elementary schools ===
- Kosugaya Elementary School
- Miwa Elementary School
- Onizaki North Elementary School
- Onizaki South Elementary School
- Ono Elementary School
- Nishiura North Elementary School
- Nishiura South Elementary School
- Tokoname East Elementary School
- Tokoname West Elementary School

== Transportation ==
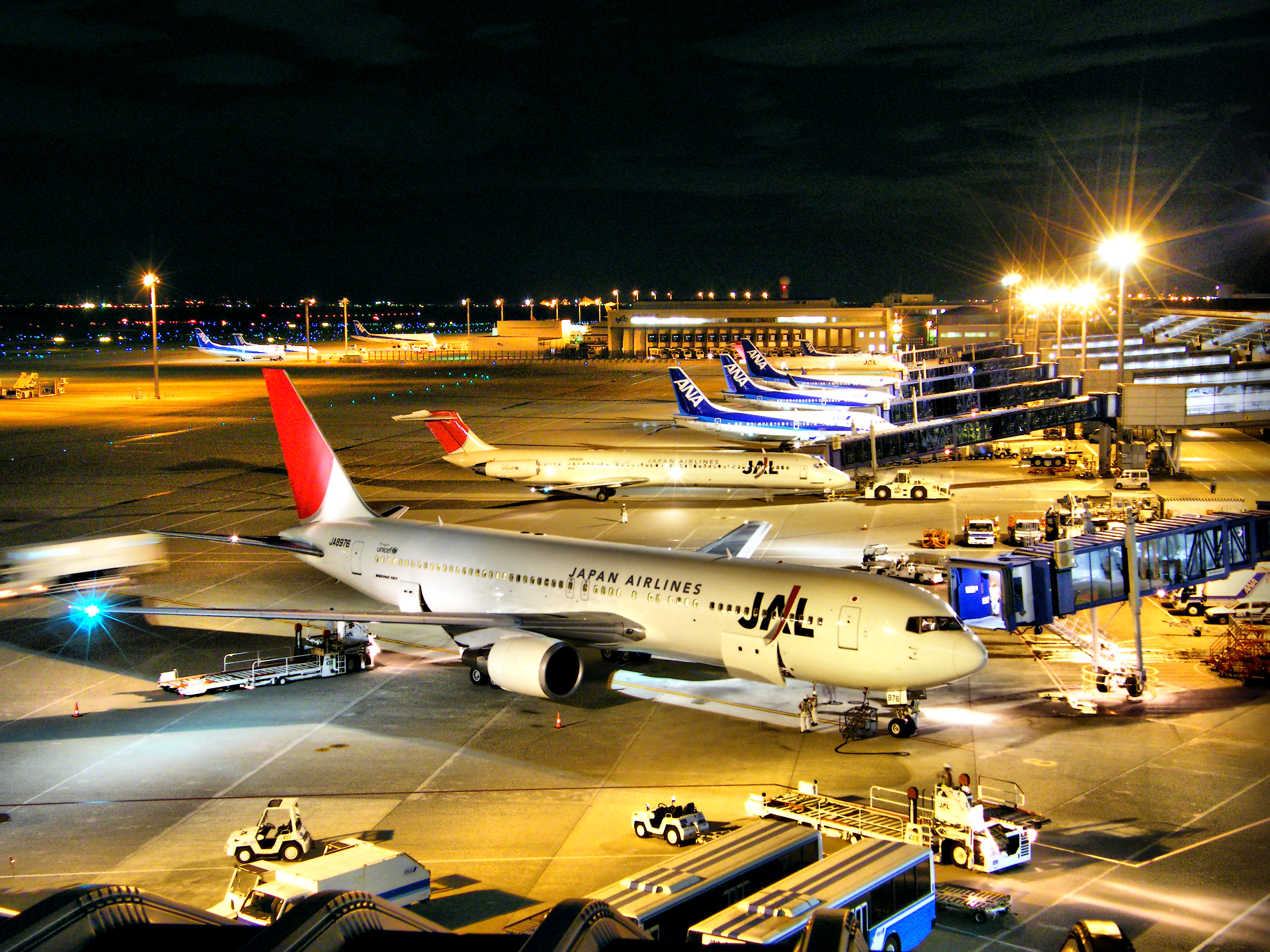
Chubu International Airport

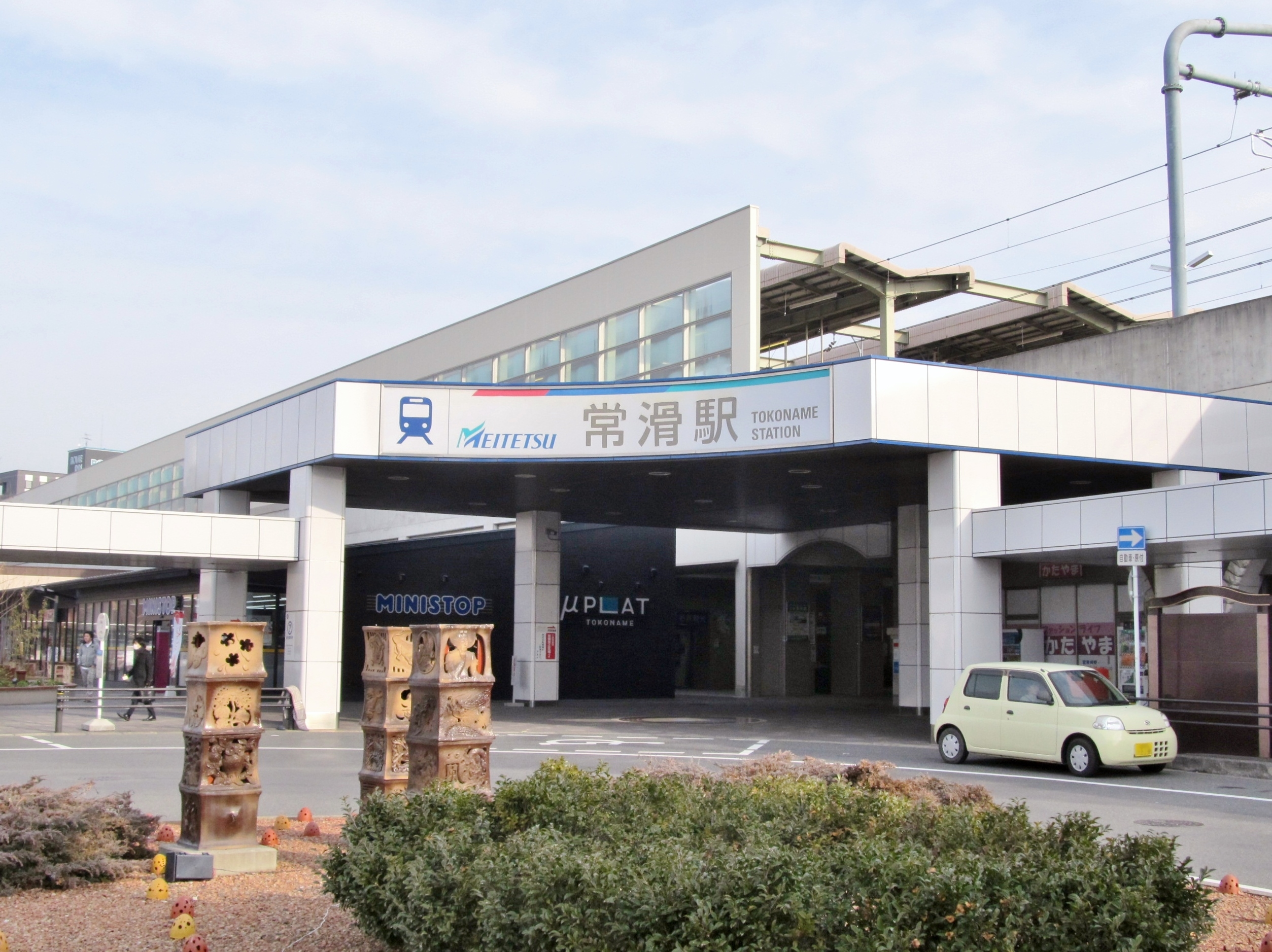
Tokoname Station

=== Airways ===
==== Airport ====
- Chūbu Centrair International Airport

=== Railways ===
==== Conventional lines ====
Meitetsu

- Tokoname Line: Ōnomachi – Nishinokuchi – Kabaike – Enokido – Taya – Tokoname
- Airport Line: Tokoname – Rinkū-Tokoname – Central Japan International Airport

=== Buses ===
==== Bus services ====
Chita Bus (Chita Noriai)

- Kariya-Central Japan International Airport Route
  - Chiryu – Kariya – Ogawa – Central Japan International Airport
- Tokoname Route
  - Chintahanda – Narawabashi – Tokoname – Central Japan International Airport /- RinkuTokoname – Tokoname – Tokoname Public Hospital
- Tokoname South Route
  - Kaminomae – Tokoname – *Central Japan International Airport/ – RinkuTokoname – Tokoname – Tokoname Public Hospital
  - *All passengers going to Central Japan International Airport need to get a transfer ticket and change to Tokoname Route Services at Tokoname Station.

Tokoname City North Bus

- Tokoname Municipal Government – Tokoname – Tokoname Public Hospital – YadaCentral – Ogura Public Hall

=== Roads ===
==== Expressway ====
- Chitaōdan Road (Tollroad)
- Chubu International Airport Connecting Road (Tollroad)

==== Japan National Route ====
- National Route 155
- National Route 247

== Local attractions ==
- Inax Museum
- Akio Morita Library
- Ōno Castle
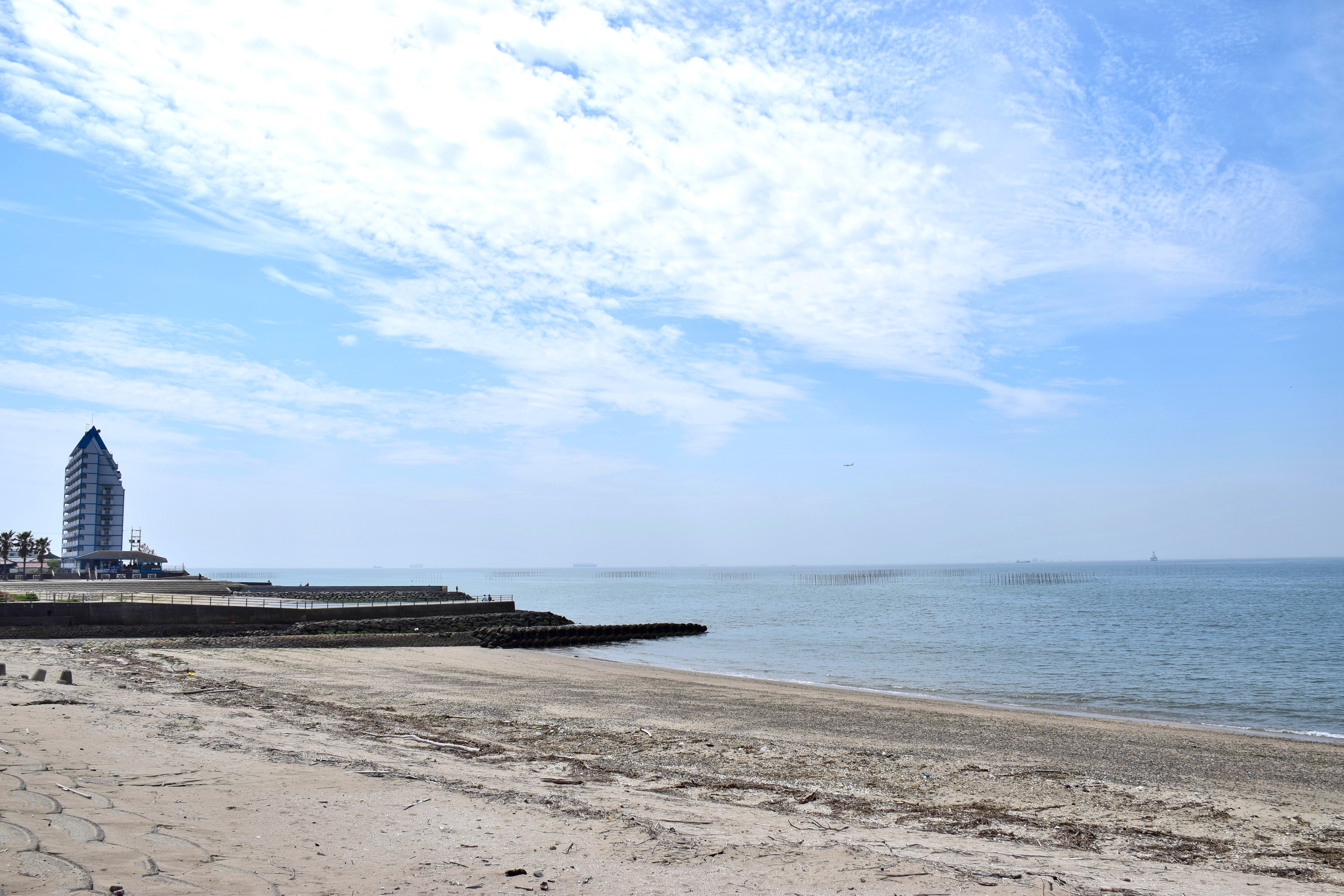
Ōno beach

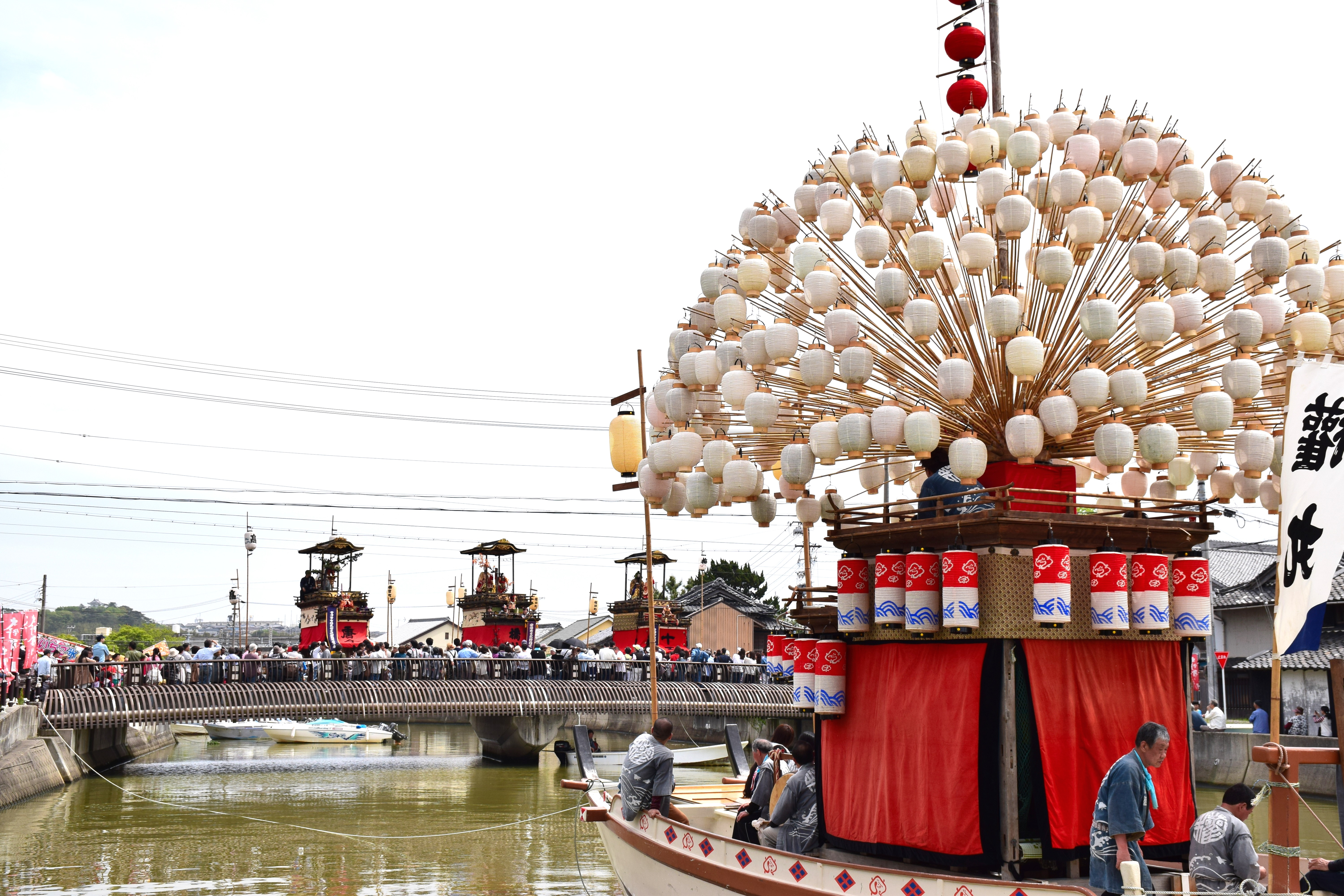
Ōno Festival

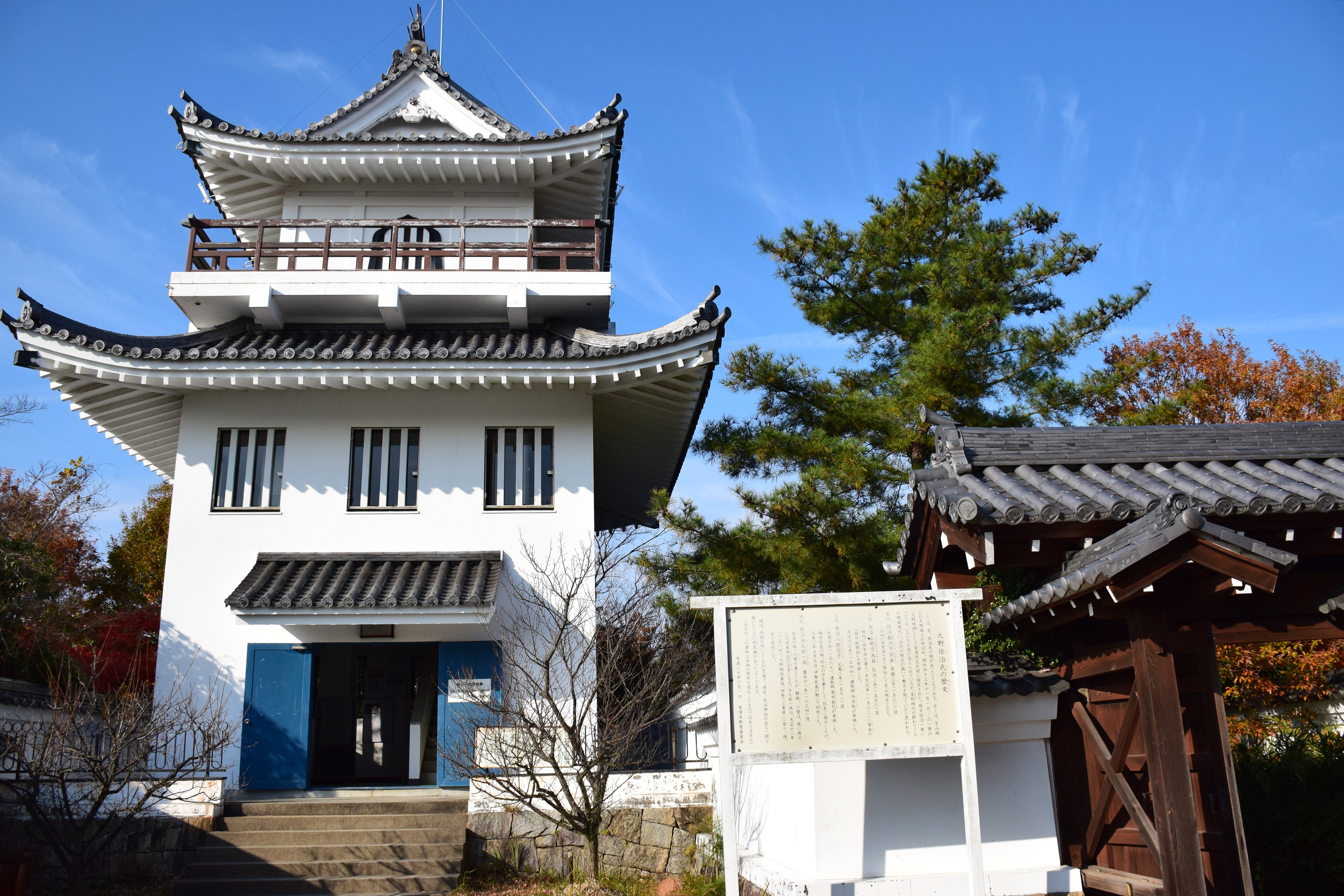
Ōno Castle

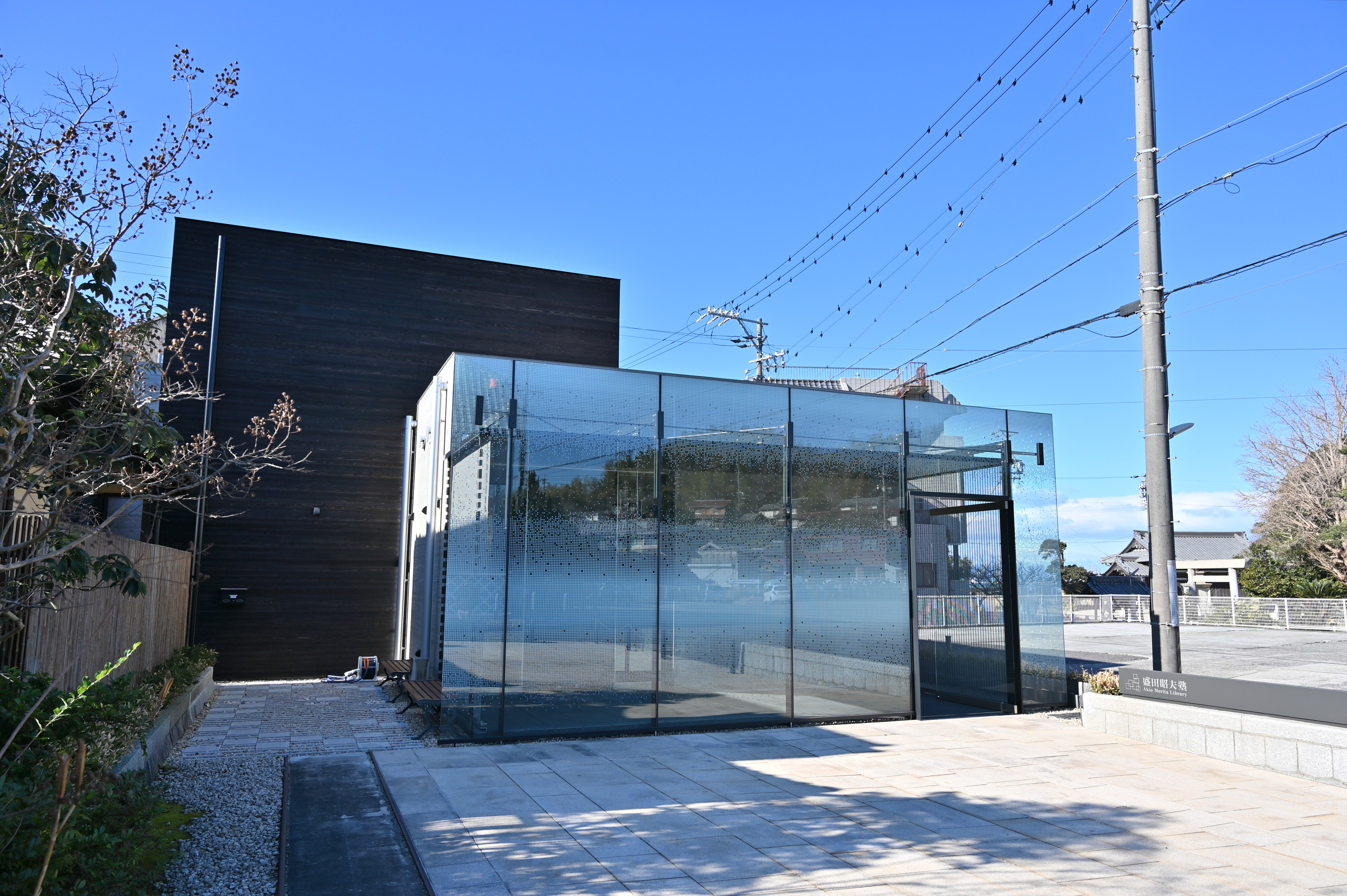
Akio Morita Library

== Notable people from Tokoname ==
- Tatsutoshi Goto, professional wrestler
- The Peanuts, singers
- Kotaro Suzumura, economist
- Tetsuzō Tanikawa, philosopher, father of Shuntarō Tanikawa
- Shibayama Tomotaka, anime director of the 2020 A Whisker Away, which takes place in Tokoname
- Tetsu Watanabe, actor
