= Tokoname Station =

Railway station in Tokoname, Aichi Prefecture, Japan

Tokoname Station 常滑駅

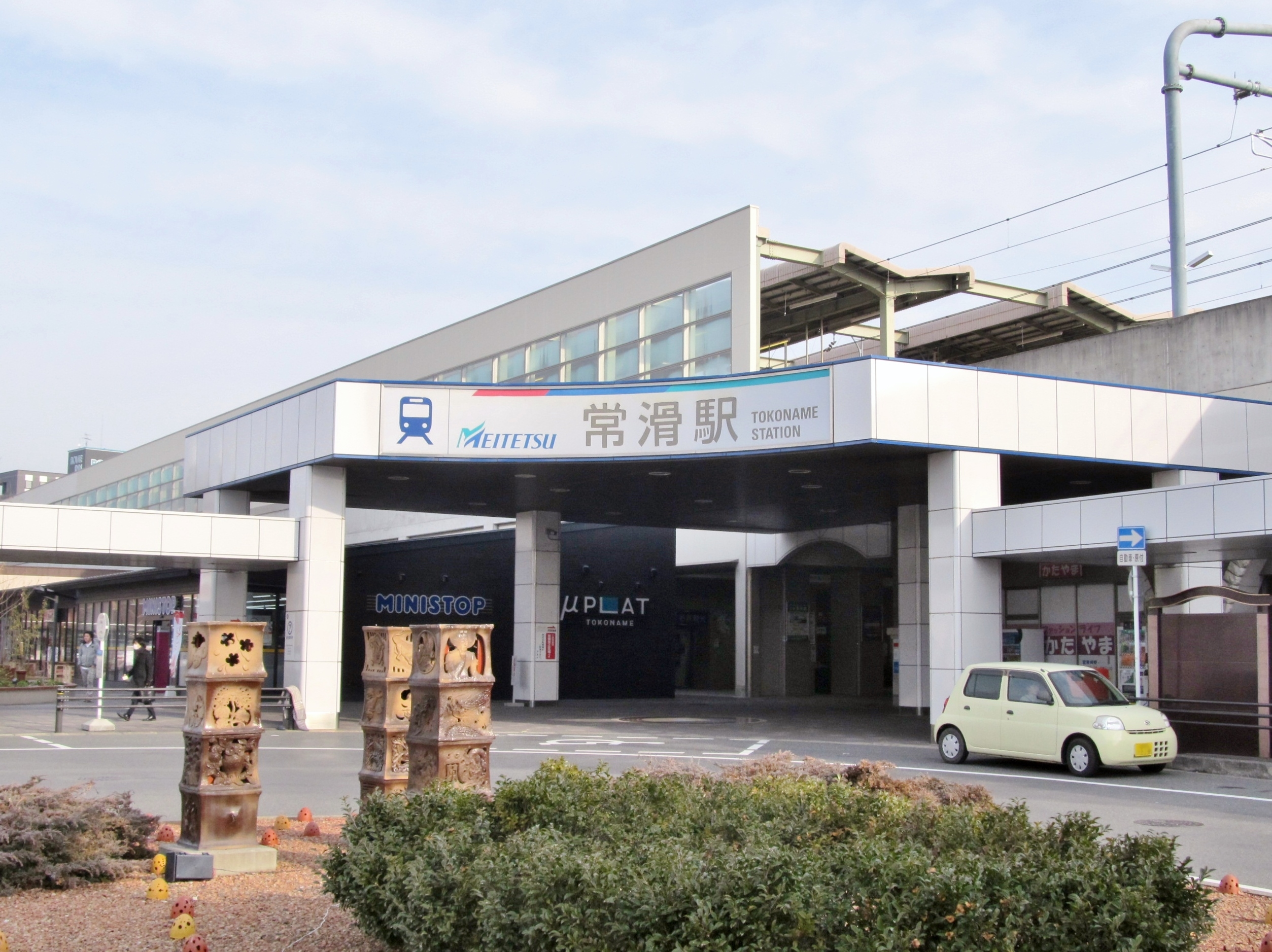
- Tokoname Station in February 2019

General information
- Location: 5-141-2 Koiehonmachi, Tokoname-shi, Aichi-ken 479-0838; Japan
- Coordinates: 34.8913°N 136.8351°E
- Operator: Meitetsu
- Line: ■ Meitetsu Tokoname Line
- Distance: 29.3 kilometers from Jingū-mae
- Platforms: 2 island platforms

Other information
- Status: Staffed
- Station code: TA22
- Website: Official website

History
- Opened: April 1, 1913

Passengers
- FY2016: 11284 daily
Services
Preceding station	Meitetsu	Following station
Central Japan International Airport One-way operation	μSky (departures for Nagoya before 9 a.m.)	Shin Maiko towards Meitetsu Gifu or Shin-Unuma
Central Japan International Airport Terminus	Airport Line Limited Express Rapid Express	through to Tokoname Line
Rinkū Tokoname towards Central Japan International Airport	Airport Line Express Semi-Express Local	through to Tokoname Line
through to Airport Line	Tokoname Line Limited Express	Shin Maiko towards Jingū-mae
through to Airport Line	Tokoname Line Rapid Express	Shin Maiko One-way operation
through to Airport Line	Tokoname Line Express Semi-Express	Ōnomachi towards Jingū-mae
through to Airport Line	Tokoname Line Express (some trains)	Nishinokuchi towards Jingū-mae
through to Airport Line	Tokoname Line Express (some trains)	Enokido towards Jingū-mae
through to Airport Line	Tokoname Line Local	Taya towards Jingū-mae
Location
- Location within Aichi Prefecture Location within Japan

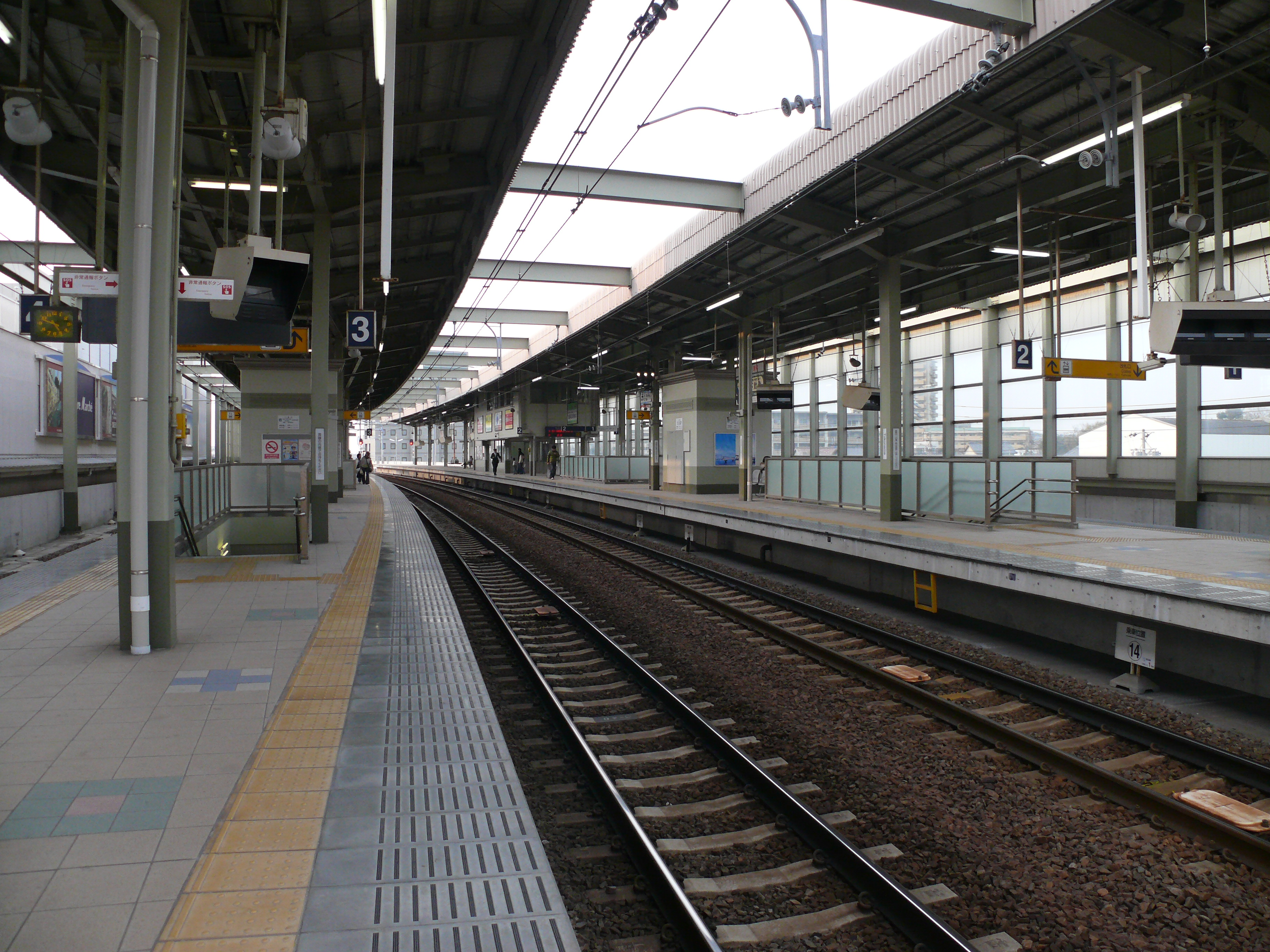
Platforms

Track layout

Tokoname Station (常滑駅, Tokoname-eki) is a junction railway station in the city of Tokoname, Aichi, Japan, operated by Meitetsu.

== Lines ==
Tokoname Station is served by the Meitetsu Tokoname Line, and is located 29.3 kilometers from the starting point of the line at Jingū-mae. It is also regarded as the terminal station for the Meitetsu Airport Line.

== Station layout ==
The station is an elevated station with two island platforms and the station building located underneath. The station has automated ticket machines, Manaca automated turnstiles and it is staffed.

=== Platforms ===
1	■ Airport Line	For Central Japan International Airport
2	■ Airport Line	For Central Japan International Airport
3	■ Tokoname Line	For Ōtagawa, Jingū-mae, Nagoya, Gifu and Shin Kani
4	■ Tokoname Line	For Ōtagawa, Jingū-mae, Nagoya, Gifu and Shin Kani

== Station history ==
Tokoname Station was opened on April 1, 1913 as a terminal station on the Aichi Electric Railway Company. The Aichi Electric Railway became part of the Meitetsu group on August 1, 1935. A second platform was added in December 1982, and the station building was rebuilt in 1987. The station was closed from January 2002 to October 2003 to allow for the elevation of the tracks and the construction of a new station building. In January 2005, the Tranpass system of magnetic fare cards with automatic turnstiles was implemented. The Meitetsu Airport Line also began operations from January 2005.

== Passenger statistics ==
In fiscal 2016, the station was used by an average of 11,284 passengers daily (boarding passengers only).

== Surrounding area ==
- Tokoname City Hall
- Tokoname Boat Race Stadium

== See also ==
- List of railway stations in Japan
