= Ōtagawa Station =

Railway station in Tōkai, Aichi Prefecture, Japan

Ōtagawa Station 太田川駅

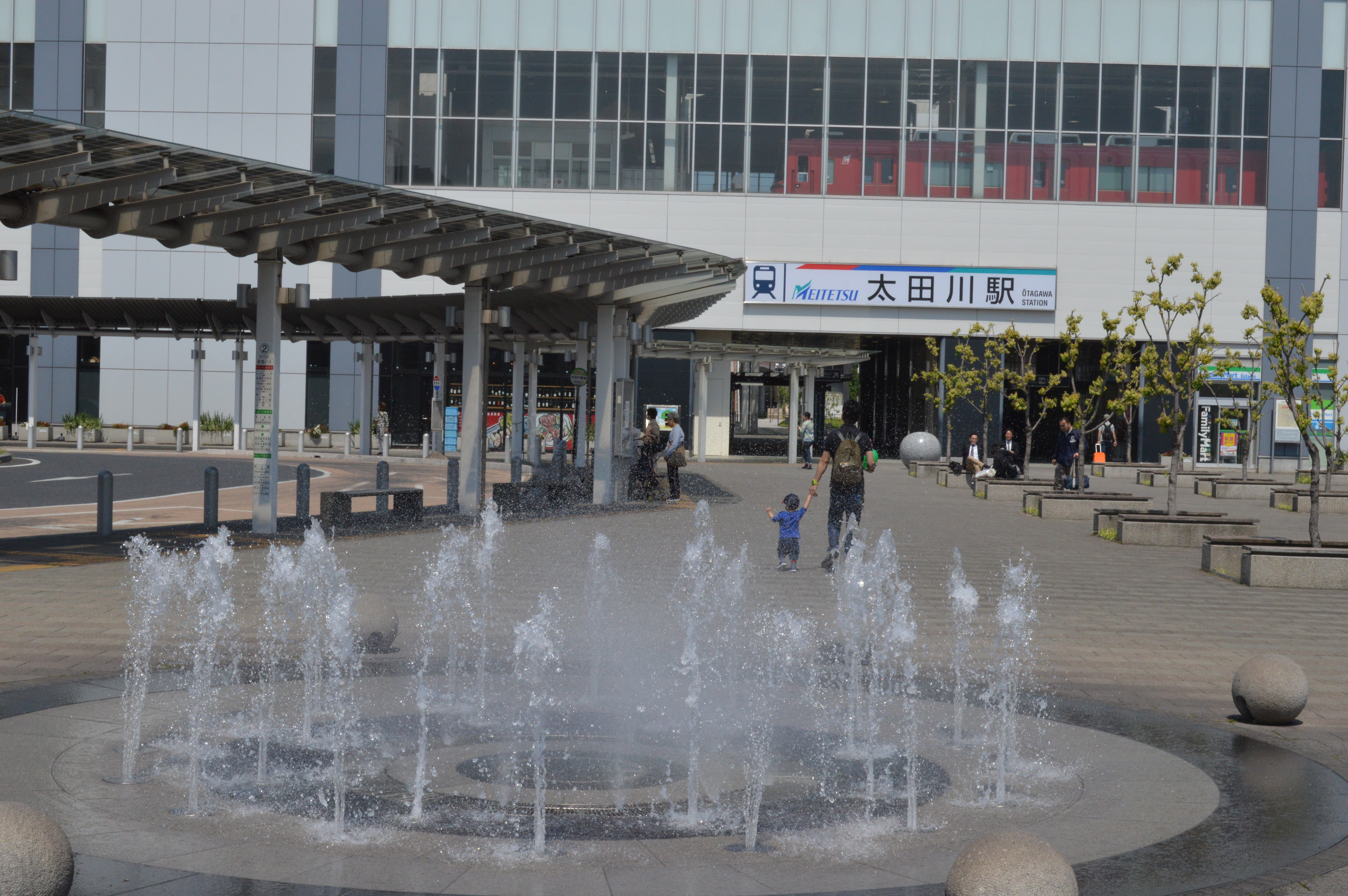
- Ōtagawa Station in May 2017

General information
- Location: Ushiroda-52 Ōtamachi, Tokai-shi, Aichi-ken 477-0031; Japan
- Coordinates: 35.0203°N 136.8924°E
- Operator: Meitetsu
- Lines: ■ Tokoname Line; ■Kōwa Line
- Distance: 12.3 kilometers from Jingū-mae
- Platforms: 3 island platforms

Other information
- Status: Staffed
- Station code: TA09
- Website: Official website

History
- Opened: February 18, 1912

Passengers
- FY 2017: 19,445 daily
Location
- Location within Aichi Prefecture Location within Japan

Ōtagawa Station (太田川駅, Ōtagawa-eki) is a junction railway station in the city of Tōkai, Aichi Prefecture, Japan, operated by Meitetsu.

== Lines ==
Ōtagawa Station is served by the Meitetsu Tokoname Line, and is located 12.3 kilometers from the starting point of the line at Jingū-mae. It is also a terminal station for the Meitetsu Kōwa Line and is 28.0 kilometers from the opposing terminal of the station at Kōwa.

== Station layout ==
The station has three elevated island platforms, 2 on the 2nd level, and the other on the 3rd level. The station has automated ticket machines, Manaca automated turnstiles and is staffed.

=== Platforms ===
2nd level

1	■ Tokoname Line	for Tokoname (side line)
1	■ Kōwa Line	for Chita Handa, Kōwa, and Utsumi (side line)
2	■ Tokoname Line	for Tokoname and Central Japan International Airport
2	■ Kōwa Line	for Kōwa and Utsumi
3	■ Tokoname Line	for Jingū-mae, Nagoya, Gifu, Inuyama, Shin Kani, and Tsushima (from Tokoname)
4	■ Tokoname Line	for Jingū-mae, Nagoya, Gifu, and Inuyama (side line from Tokoname)

3rd level

5	■ Kōwa Line	for Jingū-mae, Nagoya, Gifu, and Inuyama (side line from the Kōwa Line)
6	■ Kōwa Line	for Jingū-mae, Nagoya, Gifu, and Inuyama (from the Kōwa Line)

Ōtagawa Station track diagram.

== Adjacent stations ==
←	Service	→
Meitetsu Tokoname Line
Jingū-mae	μSKY trains (departing from Central Japan Int'l Airport before 9 a.m.)	Owari Yokosuka
Jingū-mae	Limited Express (特急)	Owari Yokosuka
Jingū-mae	Rapid Express (快速急行)	Owari Yokosuka
Ōe	Express (急行)	Owari Yokosuka
Shūrakuen	Semi Express (準急)	Owari Yokosuka
Shin Nittetsu-mae	Local (普通)	Owari Yokosuka
Kōwa Line
(from Tokoname Line)	Limited Express (特急)	Agui
(From Tokoname Line)	Rapid Express (快速急行)	Minami Kagiya
(From Tokoname Line)	Express (急行)	Minami Kagiya
(From Tokoname Line)	Semi Express (準急)	Minami Kagiya
(From Tokoname Line)	Local (普通)	Takayokosuka

== Station history ==
Ōtagawa Station was opened on February 18, 1912, as a station on the Aichi Electric Railway Company. The privately owned Chita Railways connected to the station on April 1, 1931. The Aichi Electric Railway became part of the Meitetsu group on August 1, 1935, followed by the Chita Railway on February 1, 1943. The tracks were elevated from 2007 to 2008 and the station building rebuilt from 2010 to 2012.

== Passenger statistics ==
In fiscal 2017, the station was used by an average of 19,445 passengers daily

== Surrounding area ==
- Tokai City Hall
- Nihon Fukushi University

== See also ==
- List of railway stations in Japan
