= Central Japan International Airport Station =

Railway station in Tokoname, Aichi Prefecture, Japan

Central Japan International Airport Station 中部国際空港（セントレア）駅

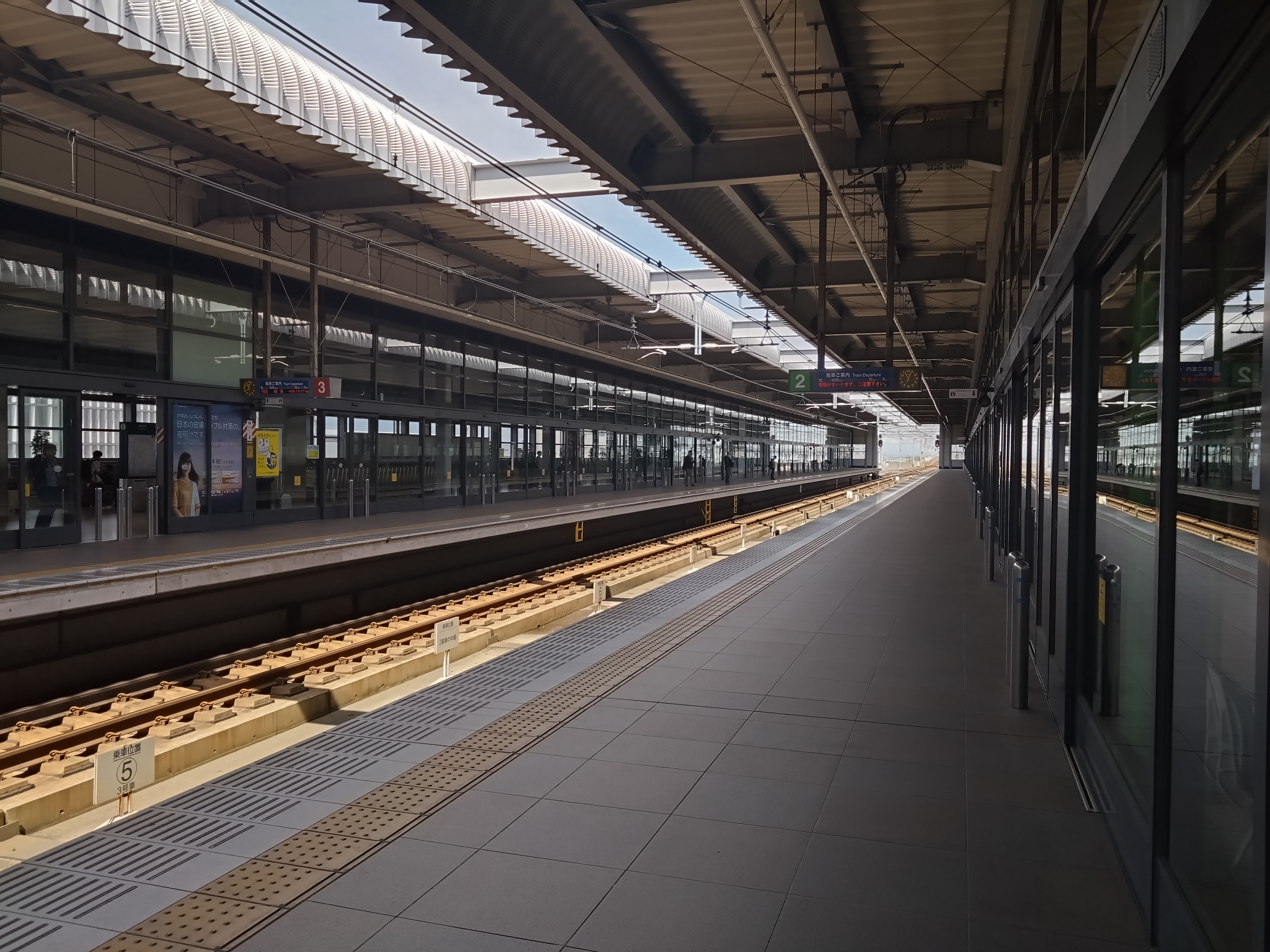
- Platforms of the station in March 2025

General information
- Location: Centrair, Tokoname-shi, Aichi-ken; Japan
- Coordinates: 34.8595°N 136.8165°E
- Owner: Central Japan International Airport Line Company Ltd.
- Operator: Meitetsu
- Line: ■ Airport Line
- Distance: 4.2 km (2.6 mi) from Tokoname
- Platforms: 3 (2 islands, with 1 platform retained for future use)
- Tracks: 3
- Connections: Chūbu Centrair International Airport

Construction
- Structure type: Elevated

Other information
- Station code: TA24
- Website: Official website

History
- Opened: 16 October 2004

Passengers
- FY2016: 24,485 daily

Services
Preceding station	Meitetsu	Following station
Terminus	μSky	Jingū-mae towards Meitetsu Gifu or Shin-Unuma
Terminus	μSky (departures for Nagoya before 9 a.m.)	Tokoname towards Meitetsu Gifu or Shin-Unuma
Terminus	Airport Line Limited Express Rapid Express	Tokoname Terminus
Terminus	Airport Line Express Semi-Express Local	Rinkū Tokoname towards Tokoname
Location
- Location within Aichi Prefecture Location within Japan

Track layout

Central Japan International Airport Station (中部国際空港駅, Chūbukokusaikūkō-eki) is a railway station in the city of Tokoname, Aichi, Japan, owned by Central Japan International Airport Line Company, Ltd. and leased to the private railway operator Meitetsu. The station serves Chūbu Centrair International Airport and the station concourse is connected to Terminal 1 by a short walkway and to the Flight of Dreams and Terminal 2 by a passage through the P1 parking lot building.

== Lines ==
Central Japan International Airport Station is served by the Meitetsu Airport Line, and is located 4.2 kilometres (2.6 mi) from the starting point of the line at Tokoname and 33.5 kilometres (20.8 mi) from Jingū-mae.

== Station layout ==
Central Japan International Airport Station has two elevated bay platforms serving three tracks, one is for μSky limited express trains and the other two are for commuter trains, with the station building underneath. The station has automated ticket machines and Manaca automated turnstiles, and it is staffed.

=== Platforms ===
1	■ μSky limited express trains	for Nagoya, Gifu, and Shin Unuma
2, 3	■ Airport Line	for Ōtagawa, Kanayama, Nagoya, Ichinomiya, Gifu, Inuyama, and Shin Kani

== Station history ==
Central Japan International Airport Station began operations on October 16, 2004, but initially only for workers at the airport site. It was opened officially to the general public on January 29, 2005, in advance of the opening of the airport in February.

== Passenger statistics ==
In fiscal 2016, the station was used by an average of 24,485 passengers daily (boarding passengers only).

== Surrounding area ==
- Chūbu Centrair International Airport

== See also ==
- List of railway stations in Japan
