= Jingū-mae Station =

Railway station in Nagoya, Japan

Jingū-mae Station 神宮前駅

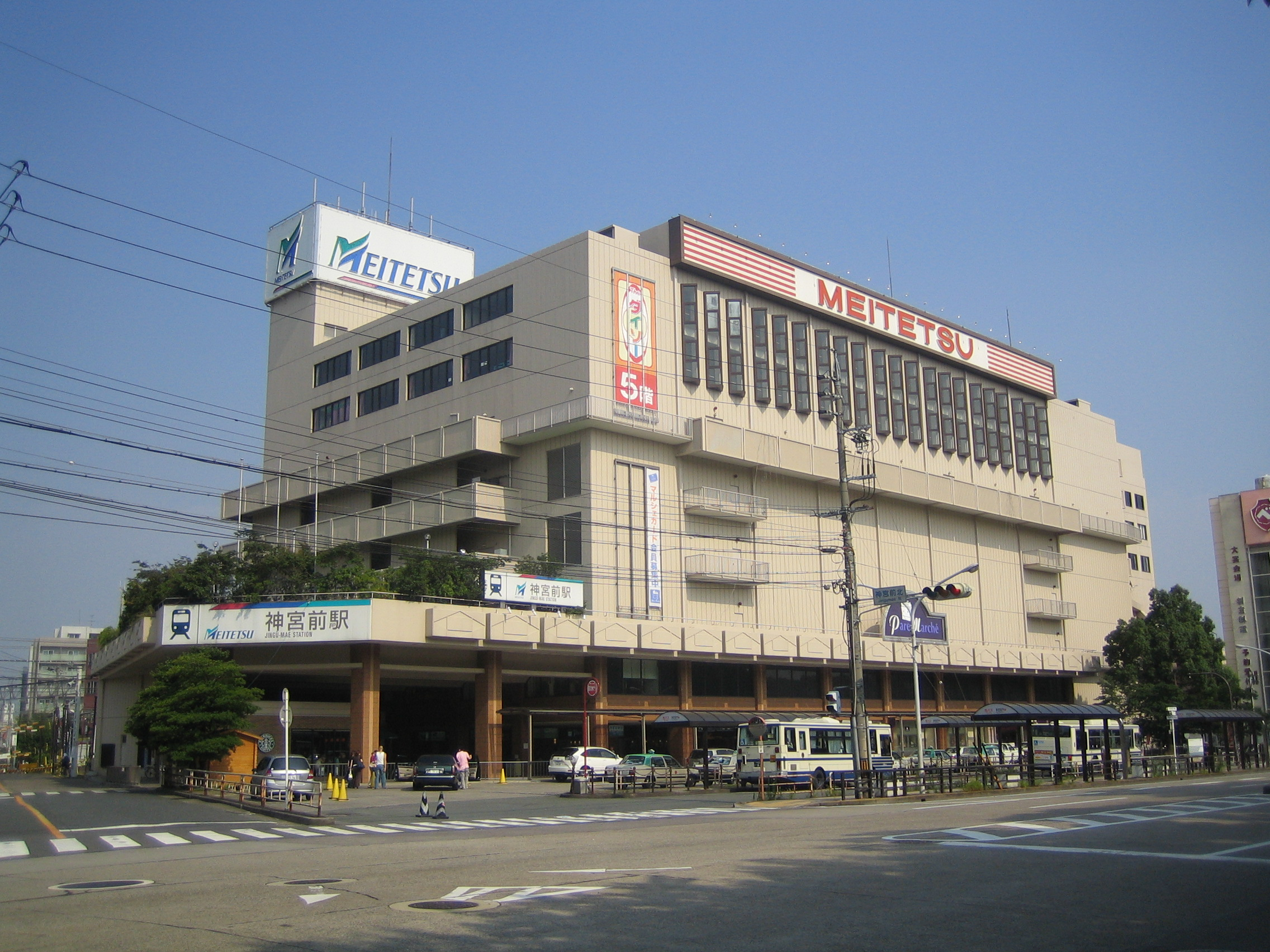
- Jingu-mae Station

General information
- Location: 18-1 Sambommatsu-cho, Atsuta-ku, Nagoya-shi, Aichi-ken 456-0032; Japan
- Coordinates: 35.1257924°N 136.9124794°E
- Operator: Meitetsu
- Lines: Meitetsu Nagoya Main Line; Meitetsu Tokoname Line
- Platforms: 2 island platforms
- Tracks: 4

Other information
- Station code: NH33
- Website: Official website

History
- Opened: 19 March 1917; 109 years ago

Passengers
- 2006: 5,840,270
Location
- Location within Japan

Jingū-mae Station (神宮前駅, Jingū-mae-eki) is a railway station in Atsuta-ku, Nagoya, Japan, operated by the private railway operator Nagoya Railroad. It is the nearest station to Atsuta Shrine.

== Lines ==
Jingū-mae Station is served by the following two Meitetsu lines.

- Meitetsu Nagoya Main Line
- Meitetsu Tokoname Line

== Station layout ==
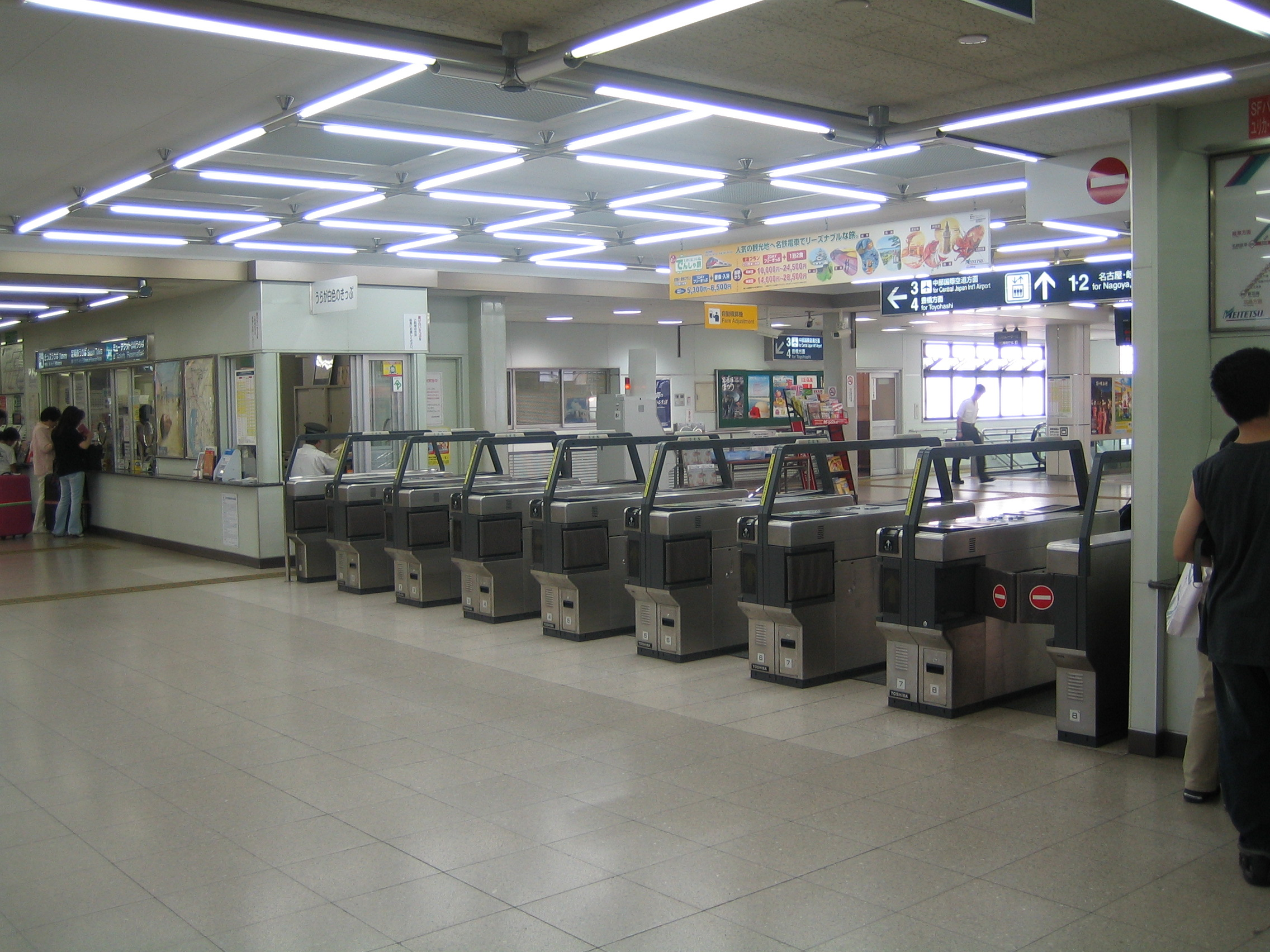
The ticket barriers

The station has two island platforms serving four tracks, with the two inner tracks used by the Tokoname Line and the two outer ones for the Nagoya Main Line.

=== Platforms ===
1, 2	■ Nagoya Main Line	for Kanayama, Nagoya, and Gifu
1, 2	■ Inuyama Line ■ Hiromi Line	for Kanayama, Nagoya, Inuyama, and Shin Kani
1, 2	■ Tsushima Line ■ Bisai Line	for Kanayama, Nagoya, Tsushima, and Saya
3	■ Meitetsu Tokoname Line ■ Airport Line	for Ōtagawa, Tokoname, and Central Japan International Airport
3	■ Kōwa Line ■ Chita New Line	for Ōtagawa, Kōwa, and Utsumi
4	■ Meitetsu Nagoya Main Line ■ Toyokawa Line	for Chiryū, Higashi Okazaki, Toyohashi, and Toyokawa-inari
4	■ Nishio Line	for Chiryū, Nishio, and Kira Yoshida

== Adjacent stations ==
←	Service	→
Meitetsu Nagoya Main Line
Chiryū	Rapid Limited Express	Kanayama
Chiryū	Limited Express	Kanayama
Horita	Express	Kanayama
Horita	Semi Express	Kanayama
Horita	Local	Kanayama
Meitetsu Tokoname Line
Kanayama (Main Line)	μSKY Limited Express (mainly)	Central Japan International Airport
Kanayama (Main Line)	μSKY Limited Express (departing from Central Japan Int'l Airport before 9 a.m.)	Ōtagawa
Kanayama (Main Line)	Limited Express	Ōtagawa
Kanayama (Main Line)	Rapid Express	Ōe; Shūrakuen; Ōtagawa (mainly)
Kanayama (Main Line)	Express	Ōe
Kanayama (Main Line)	Semi Express	Ōe
Kanayama (Main Line)	Local	Toyodahommachi

== History ==
The station opened on 19 March 1917, as a station of the Aichi Electric Railway.

In 1984, a bomb threat was sent to the station, causing it to be closed for two days. Jingū-mae Station lost an estimated $200 USD in revenue.

== Surrounding area ==
- Atsuta Shrine
- Atsuta ward office
- Headquarters of Nippon Sharyo

== See also ==
- List of railway stations in Japan
