= Daidōchō Station =

Railway station in Nagoya, Japan

Coordinates: 35.0800°N 136.9094°E

Daidōchō Station 大同町駅

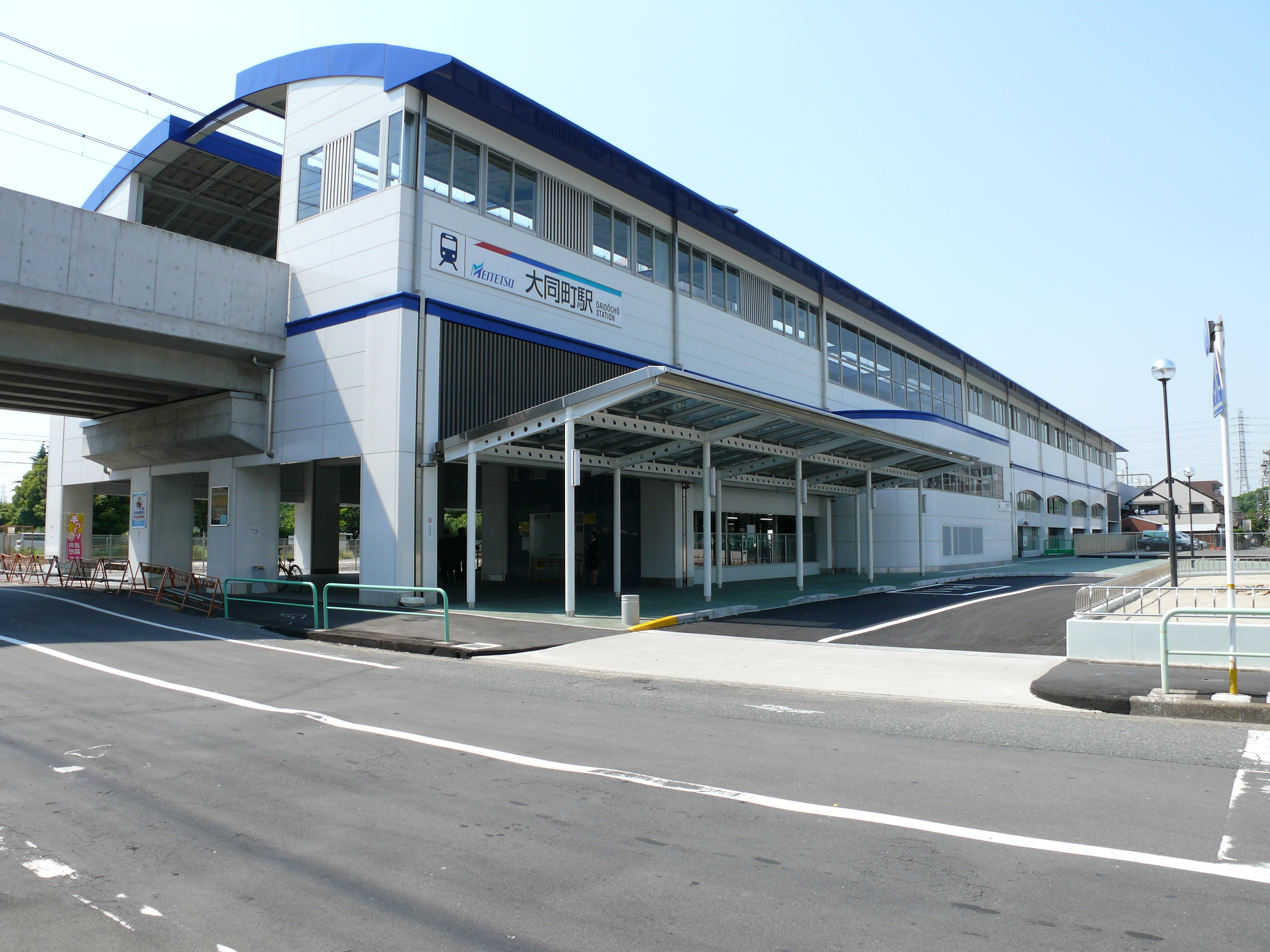
- The station house was elevated in 2006

General information
- Location: Daidōchō, Minami, Nagoya, Aichi （愛知県名古屋市南区柴田町） Japan
- Operator: Nagoya Railroad
- Line: Tokoname Line

History
- Opened: 1926
- Former names: Daidō-mae (until 1945)

Passengers
- 2009: 5,419 daily
Location

Daidōchō Station (大同町駅, Daidōchō-eki) is a train station operated by Meitetsu's Tokoname Line located in Minami Ward, Nagoya, Aichi Prefecture, Japan. It is located 5.3 rail kilometers from the terminus of the line at Jingū-mae Station. The station provides access to Daido University.

== History ==
Daidōchō Station was opened on May 31, 1926 as Daidō-mae Station (大同前駅, Daidō-mae-eki) on the Aichi Electric Railway Company. The Aichi Electric Railway became part of the Meitetsu group on August 1, 1935. The station was renamed to its present name on June 1, 1945. Express train service was discontinued from 1990. From 2004–2006, the tracks were elevated. On July 1, 2006, the Tranpass system of magnetic fare cards with automatic turnstiles was implemented, and the station has been unattended since that point. Express services were resumed in 2008.

== Lines ==
- Meitetsu
  - Tokoname Line

== Platforms ==
Daidōchō Station has two elevated side platforms.

1	■ Tokoname Line	For Ōtagawa, Tokoname, Chita Handa, and Central Japan International Airport
2	■ Tokoname Line	For Jingū-mae and Meitetsu Nagoya

== Adjacent stations ==
←	Service	→
Tokoname Line
μSKY Limited Express (ミュースカイ): Does not stop at this station
Limited Express (特急): Does not stop at this station
Rapid Express (快速急行): Does not stop at this station
Express (急行): Does not stop at this station
Ōe	Semi Express (準急)	Shūrakuen
Ōe	Local (普通)	Shibata
