= 大同大学 =

大同大學 or 大同大学 may refer to:

- Daedong College
- Daido University
- Shanxi Datong University
- Tatung University
- Utopia University
