= Nawa Station =

Nawa Station (名和駅) is the name of two train stations in Japan:

- Nawa Station (Aichi)
- Nawa Station (Tottori)
