= Shibata Station (Aichi) =

Railway station in Nagoya, Japan

Coordinates: 35.0730°N 136.9093°E

Shibata Station 柴田駅

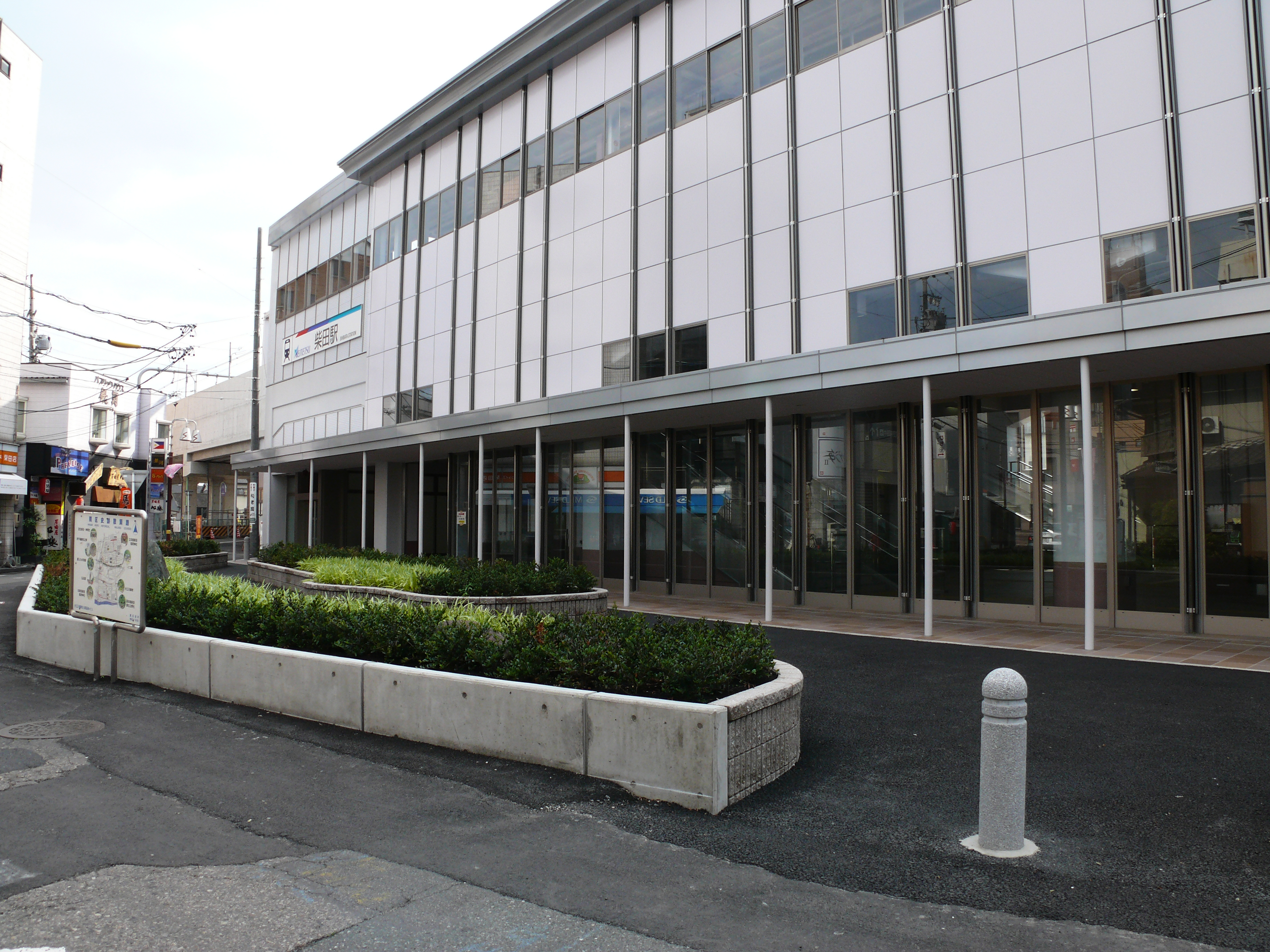
- The station house was elevated in 2006

General information
- Location: Shibata, Minami, Nagoya, Aichi （愛知県名古屋市南区柴田町） Japan
- Operator: Nagoya Railroad
- Line: Tokoname Line

History
- Opened: 1912
- Former names: Hoshizaki (until 1917)

Passengers
- 2009: 2,598 daily
Location

Shibata Station (柴田駅, Shibata-eki) is a railway station operated by Meitetsu's Tokoname Line located in Minami Ward, Nagoya, Aichi Prefecture, Japan. It is located 6.1 rail kilometers from the terminus of the line at Jingū-mae Station.

== History ==
Shibata Station was opened on February 18, 1912 as Hoshizaki Station (星崎駅, Hoshizaki-eki) on the Aichi Electric Railway Company. The station was renamed to its present name in 1917. The Aichi Electric Railway became part of the Meitetsu group on August 1, 1935. Express train service was discontinued from 1990. From 2004–2006, the tracks were elevated. On July 1, 2006, the Tranpass system of magnetic fare cards with automatic turnstiles was implemented, and the station has been unattended since that point.

== Lines ==
- Meitetsu
  - Tokoname Line

== Layout ==
Shibata Station has two elevated side platforms.

=== Platforms ===
1	■ Tokoname Line	For Ōtagawa, Tokoname, Chita Handa, and Central Japan International Airport
2	■ Tokoname Line	For Jingū-mae and Meitetsu Nagoya

== Adjacent stations ==
←	Service	→
Tokoname Line
μSKY Limited Express (ミュースカイ): Does not stop at this station
Limited Express (特急): Does not stop at this station
Rapid Express (快速急行): Does not stop at this station
Express (急行): Does not stop at this station
Daidōchō	Semi Express (準急) (1 train for Central Japan Int'l Airport in the morning)	Shūrakuen
Daidōchō	Local (普通)	Nawa
