= Meitetsu Chikkō Line =

Railway line in Aichi Prefecture, Japan

Chikkō Line

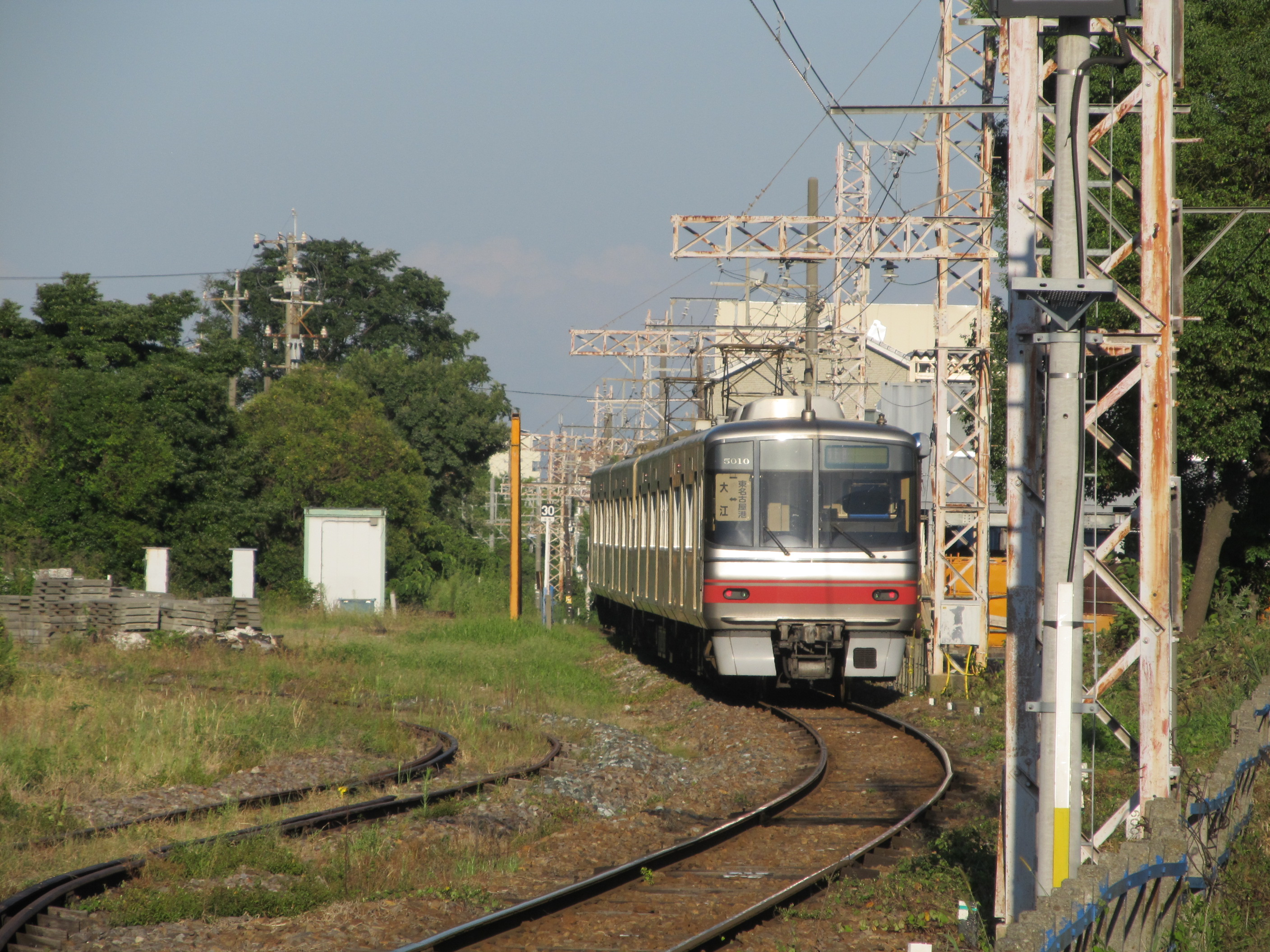
- A Meitetsu 5000 series EMU passing Meiden Chikkō freight yard

Overview
- Native name: 築港線
- Status: In service
- Owner: Nagoya Railroad Co., Ltd.
- Line number: CH
- Locale: Nagoya, Aichi
- Termini: Ōe; Higashi Nagoyakō
- Stations: 2

Service
- Type: Commuter rail
- System: Meitetsu
- Operator(s): Nagoya Railroad Co., Ltd.

History
- Opened: January 15, 1924; 102 years ago

Technical
- Line length: 1.5 km (0.9 mi)
- Number of tracks: single
- Track gauge: 1,067 mm (3 ft 6 in)
- Minimum radius: 160 m
- Electrification: 1,500 V DC, overhead catenary
- Operating speed: 60 km/h (37 mph)

The Chikkō Line (築港線, Chikkō-sen) is a 1.5 km Japanese railway line in Nagoya, Aichi Prefecture, owned and operated by the private railway operator Nagoya Railroad (Meitetsu). At Meiden Chikkō, between the line's two stations, there is a connection to the freight-only Nagoya Rinkai Railway Tōchiku line.

== History ==
The line was opened in 1924 by the Aichi Electric Railway, electrified at 1,500 V DC, to service the Nagoya Port. The line was double-tracked in 1939, but after being damaged by Typhoon Vera in 1959, the line was repaired as a single track. Although the line used to handle many freight services, they ceased in 1984. A test line for testing maglev trains ran alongside the line between 1991 and 2004, but the line was removed after Linimo opened.

West end of line track diagram

At the start of the March 16, 2024, timetable revision, the fleet of 5000 series four-car trains used on the line were replaced with 3100 series, 3150 series, and 9100 series two-car sets.

== Network and operations ==
Regularly scheduled trains on the line run from 7:00 to 8:28 and 16:44 to 19:44 during weekdays with a frequency of 3~5 trains per hour. Two extra trains are scheduled in 6 a.m., one in 16:14, and three in 8 p.m. and 9 p.m. During weekends, trains run from 7:18 to 8:16 and 16:33 to 17:20 with a frequency of 1~3 trains per hour. Extra trains are scheduled from 17:44 to 21:03 during weekends.

=== Stations ===
No.	Name	Japanese	Distance (km)	Transfers	Location
TA03	Ōe	大江	0.0	Tokoname Line (TA03)	Minami-ku, Nagoya
CH01	Higashi Nagoyakō	東名古屋港	1.5		Minami-ku, Nagoya
