= Shibata Station =

Shibata Station is the name of multiple train stations in Japan.

- Shibata Station (Aichi) - (柴田駅) in Aichi Prefecture
- Shibata Station (Niigata) - (新発田駅) in Niigata Prefecture
