= Taedong =

Taedong or Daedong may refer to:

- Taedong River, North Korea
- Taedong County, a kun (county) in South Pyongan province, North Korea
- Daedong College, Busan, South Korea
- Daedong Corporation, a South Korean agricultural machinery manufacturing company
- Daedong Credit Bank, Pyongyang, North Korea
- Taedongmun, a gate of Pyongyang Castle
- Taedong, South Korea, a fictional village in the M*A*S*H episode For the Good of the Outfit
