= Higashi Nagoyakō Station =

Railway station in Nagoya, Japan

Coordinates: 35.0891°N 136.8994°E

Higashi Nagoyakō Station 東名古屋港駅

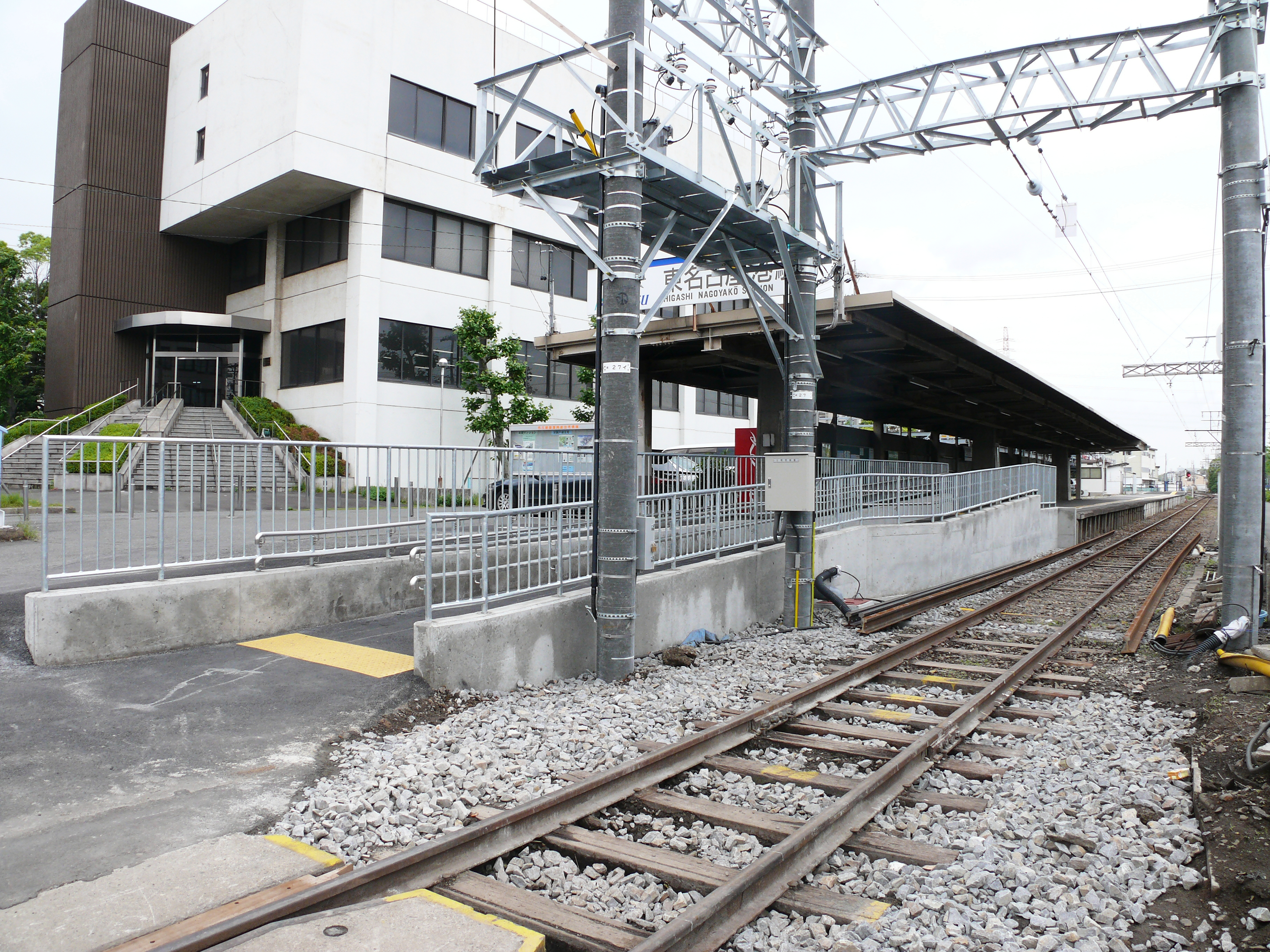
- Higashi Nagoyakō Station

General information
- Location: 1-6 Ōe-cho, Minato, Nagoya, Aichi （愛知県名古屋市港区大江町1-6） Japan
- Operator: Meitetsu
- Line: Meitetsu Chikkō Line

History
- Opened: 1924
- Former names: Nishi-Rokugō (until 1932)

Passengers
- FY2009: 2,941 daily

Services
Preceding station	Meitetsu	Following station
Ōe Terminus	Chikkō Line	Terminus
Location

Higashi Nagoyakō Station (東名古屋港駅, Higashi Nagoyakō-eki) is a railway station on the Meitetsu Chikkō Line operated by the private railway operator operated by Nagoya Railroad (Meitetsu) in Minato-ku, Nagoya, Aichi Prefecture, Japan.

== Lines ==
Higashi Nagoyakō Station is served by the Meitetsu Chikkō Line, and is a terminal station for the line, located 1.5 km from the opposing terminus of the line at Ōe Station.

== Layout ==
Station track diagram

Higashi Nagoyakō Station has a single side platform.

=== Platforms ===
1	■ Meitetsu Chikkō Line	for Ōe

== History ==
The station was opened on January 15, 1924, as Nishi-Rokugō Station (西六号駅). It was renamed Higashi Nagoyakō on January 30, 1932. The station has been unattended since December 16, 1935. On January 15, 2005, the Tranpass system of magnetic fare cards with automatic turnstiles was implemented, which was superseded by manaca in 2011.
