= Dōtoku Station =

Railway station in Nagoya, Japan

Coordinates: 35.1056°N 136.9094°E

Dōtoku Station 道徳駅

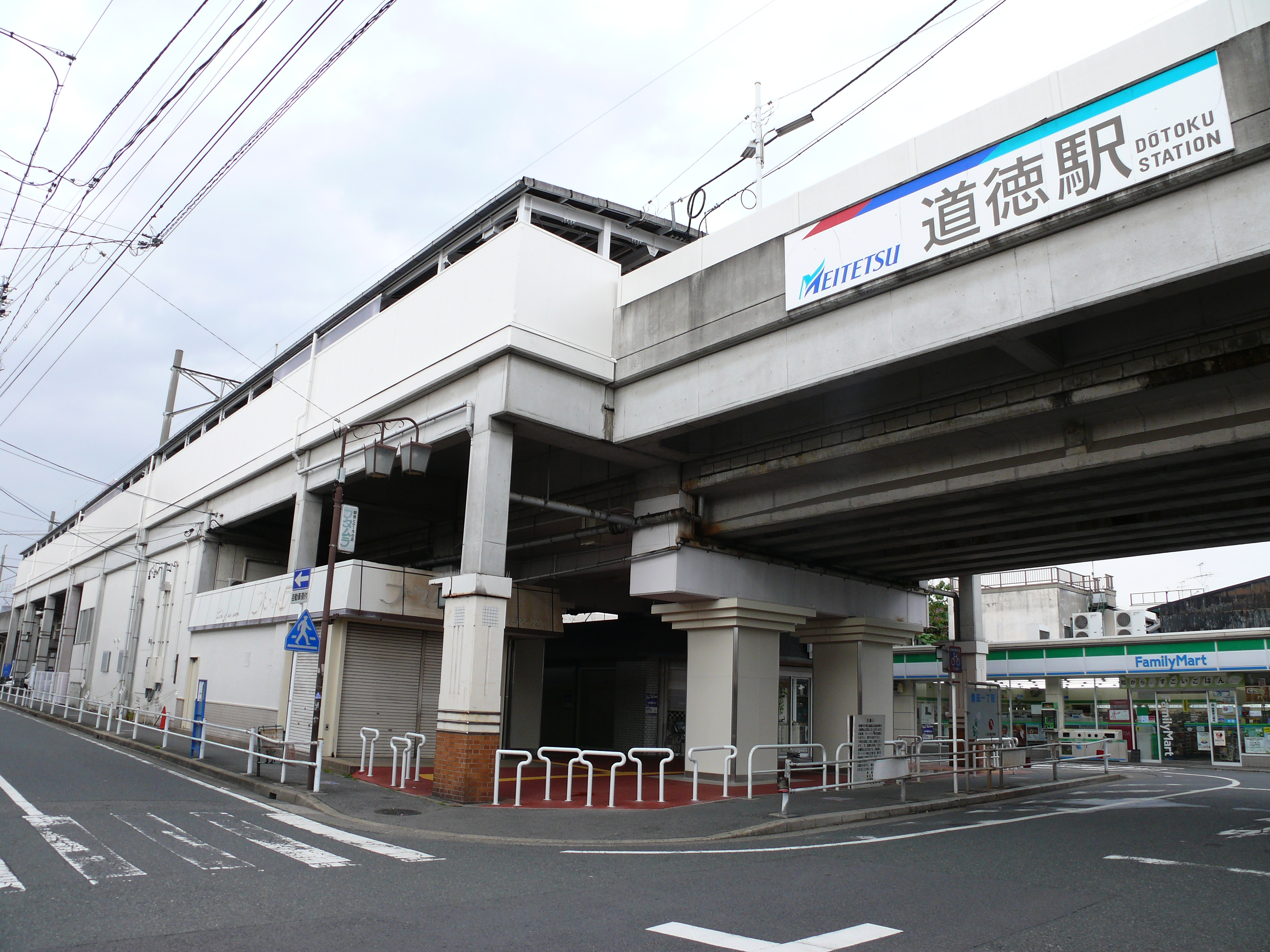
- The West gate, May 2007

General information
- Location: Toyoda 1-chome, Minami, Nagoya, Aichi （愛知県名古屋市南区豊田一丁目） Japan
- Operator: Meitetsu
- Line: Tokoname Line
- Platforms: 2 Side platforms
- Tracks: 2

Construction
- Structure type: Elevated
- Parking: No
- Cycle facilities: Yes
- Accessible: Yes

History
- Opened: 1912

Passengers
- 2013: 4,403 daily

Services
Preceding station	Meitetsu	Following station
Ōe towards Tokoname	Tokoname Line Local	Toyodahommachi towards Jingū-mae
Location

Dōtoku Station (道徳駅, Dōtoku-eki) is a railway station operated by Meitetsu's Tokoname Line located in Minami Ward, Nagoya, Aichi Prefecture, Japan. It is located 2.4 rail kilometers from the terminus of the line at Jingū-mae Station.

== History ==
Dōtoku Station was opened on February 18, 1912, as a station on the Aichi Electric Railway Company. The Aichi Electric Railway became part of the Meitetsu group on August 1, 1935. The station was closed in 1944, and reopened in October 1949. From 1983 to 1984, the tracks were elevated. On January 15, 2005, the Tranpass system of magnetic fare cards with automatic turnstiles was implemented.

== Lines ==
- Meitetsu
  - Tokoname Line

== Layout ==
Dōtoku Station has one elevated island platform.

=== Platforms ===
1	■ Tokoname Line	for Central Japan International Airport , Kowa and Utsumi
2	■ Tokoname Line	for Kanayama and Nagoya
