= Ōe Station (Aichi) =

Railway station in Nagoya, Japan

Coordinates: 35.0931°N 136.913°E

Ōe Station 大江駅

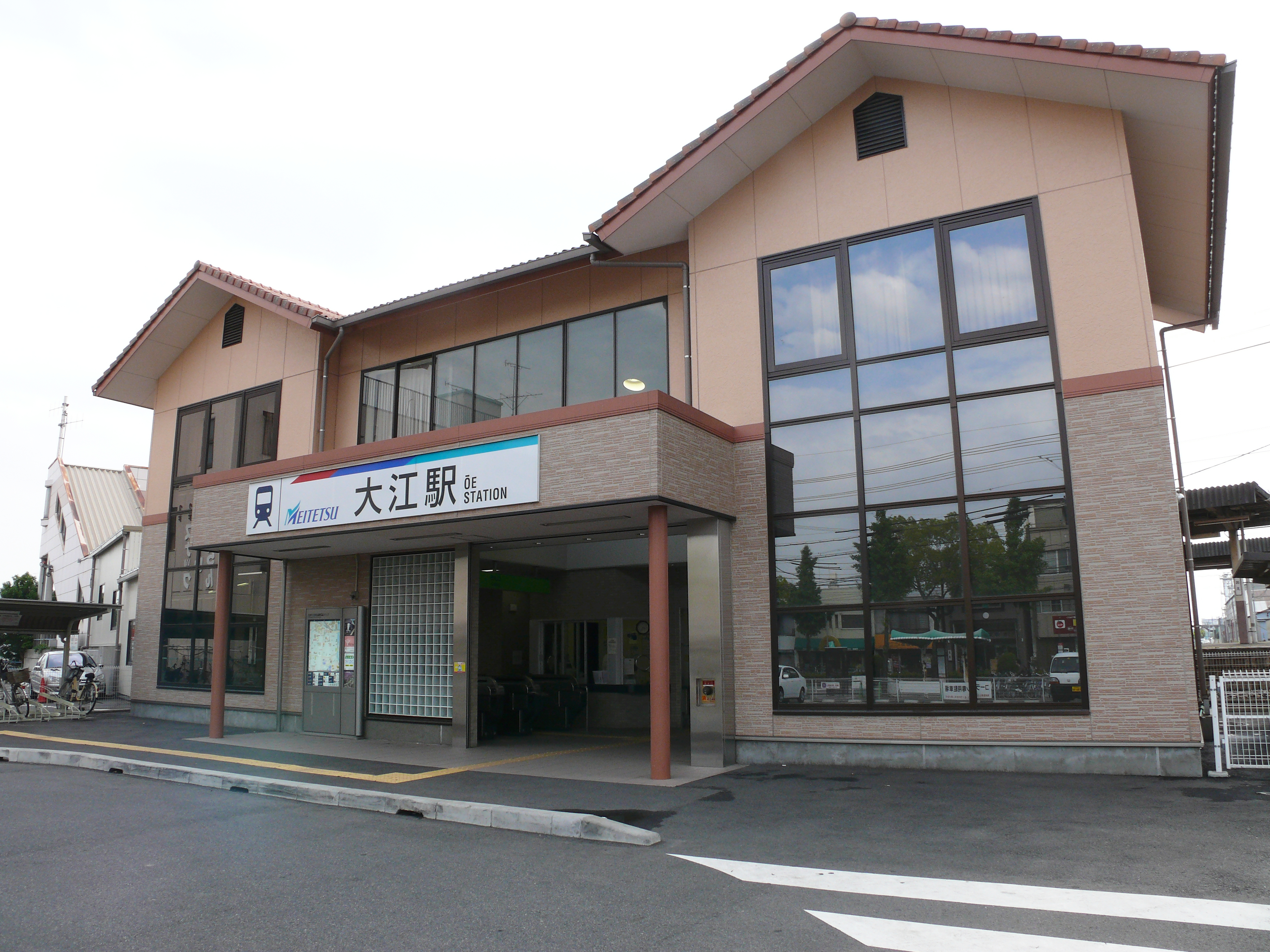
- Newly built station building, May 2007

General information
- Location: Kafuku-Hondōri, Minami, Nagoya, Aichi （愛知県名古屋市南区加福本通） Japan
- Operator: Meitetsu
- Lines: Meitetsu Tokoname Line; Meitetsu Chikkō Line

History
- Opened: 1917

Passengers
- FY2009: 2,550 daily
Location

Ōe Station (大江駅, Ōe-eki) is a railway station operated by Meitetsu on the Tokoname Line and Chikkō Line located in Minami-ku, Nagoya, Aichi Prefecture, Japan.

== Lines ==
Ōe Station is served by the Meitetsu Tokoname Line and Meitetsu Chikkō Line. It is located 3.8 km (2.4 mi) from the terminus of the Tononame line at Jingū-mae Station, and forms the terminal station for the Chikkō Line.

== Station layout ==
Ōe Station has two island platforms and one side platform, serving a total of five tracks.

=== Platforms ===
1	■ Tokoname Line	for Central Japan International Airport, Kowa and Utsumi
2	■ Tokoname Line	for Central Japan International Airport, Kowa and Utsumi
3	■ Tokoname Line	for Kanayama, Nagoya
4	■ Tokoname Line	for Kanayama, Nagoya
5	■ Chikkō Line	for Higashi Nagoyakō

Ōe Station track diagram.

== Adjacent stations ==
←	Service	→
Tokoname Line
μSKY Limited Express: Does not stop at this station
Limited Express: Does not stop at this station
Jingū-mae	Rapid Express (part of trains)	Ōtagawa
Jingū-mae	Express	Ōtagawa (some Daidōchō and Shūrakuen)
Jingū-mae	Semi Express	Daidōchō
Dōtoku	Local	Daidōchō
Chikkō Line
Terminus	-	Higashi Nagoyakō

== History ==
Ōe Station was opened on 10 May 1917, as a station on the Aichi Electric Railway Company. On 15 January 1924, a spur line to Nagoya Port, the Meitetsu Chikkō Line began operations. The Aichi Electric Railway became part of the Meitetsu group on 1 August 1935. Semi-express train service was discontinued from 29 October 1990. Later that year, the dedicated Chikkō Line platform was completed. A new station building was completed in December 2004, at which time the Tranpass system of magnetic fare cards with automatic turnstiles was implemented. This station was made a standard, permanent stop from 29 January 2005. The platforms for the Chikkō Line were extended on 3 October 2009.
