= Sakura-hommachi Station =

Metro station in Nagoya, Japan

Coordinates: 35.1089°N 136.9368°E

S15 Sakura-hommachi Station 桜本町駅
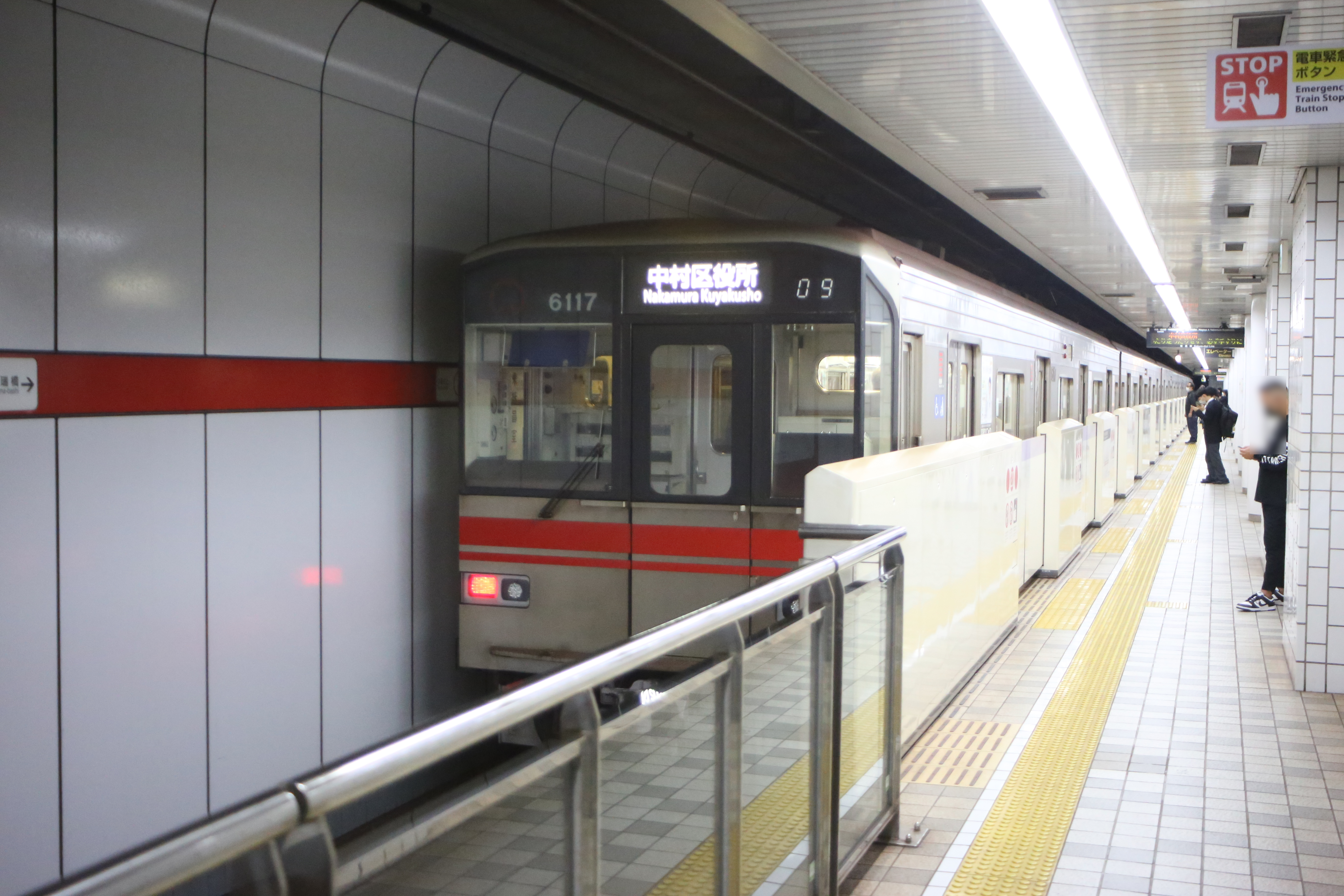

General information
- Location: Sakuradai 1-101, Minami, Nagoya, Aichi （名古屋市南区桜台一丁目101） Japan
- System: Nagoya Municipal Subway station
- Operator: Transportation Bureau City of Nagoya
- Line: Sakura-dōri Line
- Connections: Bus terminal

Other information
- Station code: S15

History
- Opened: March 30, 1994; 32 years ago

Passengers
- 2009: 3,607 daily

Services
Preceding station	Nagoya Municipal Subway	Following station
Aratama-bashi S14 towards Taiko-dori	Sakura-dōri Line	Tsurusato S16 towards Tokushige
Location

Sakura-hommachi Station (桜本町駅, Sakura-hommachi-eki) is an underground metro station located in Minami-ku, Nagoya, Aichi, Japan operated by the Nagoya Municipal Subway’s Sakura-dōri Line. It is located 12.9 kilometers from the terminus of the Sakura-dōri Line at Taiko-dori Station.

== History ==
Sakura-hommachi Station was opened on March 30, 1994.

== Lines ==
- Nagoya Municipal Subway
  - Sakura-dōri Line (Station number: S15)

== Layout ==
Sakura-hommachi Station has a single underground island platform with platform screen doors. The theme color for this station is purple.

=== Platforms ===
1	■ Sakura-dōri Line	For Tokushige
2	■ Sakura-dōri Line	For Imaike, Nagoya, and Taiko-dori
