= Toyodahommachi Station =

Railway station in Nagoya, Japan

Coordinates: 35.1137°N 136.9110°E

Toyodahommachi Station 豊田本町駅

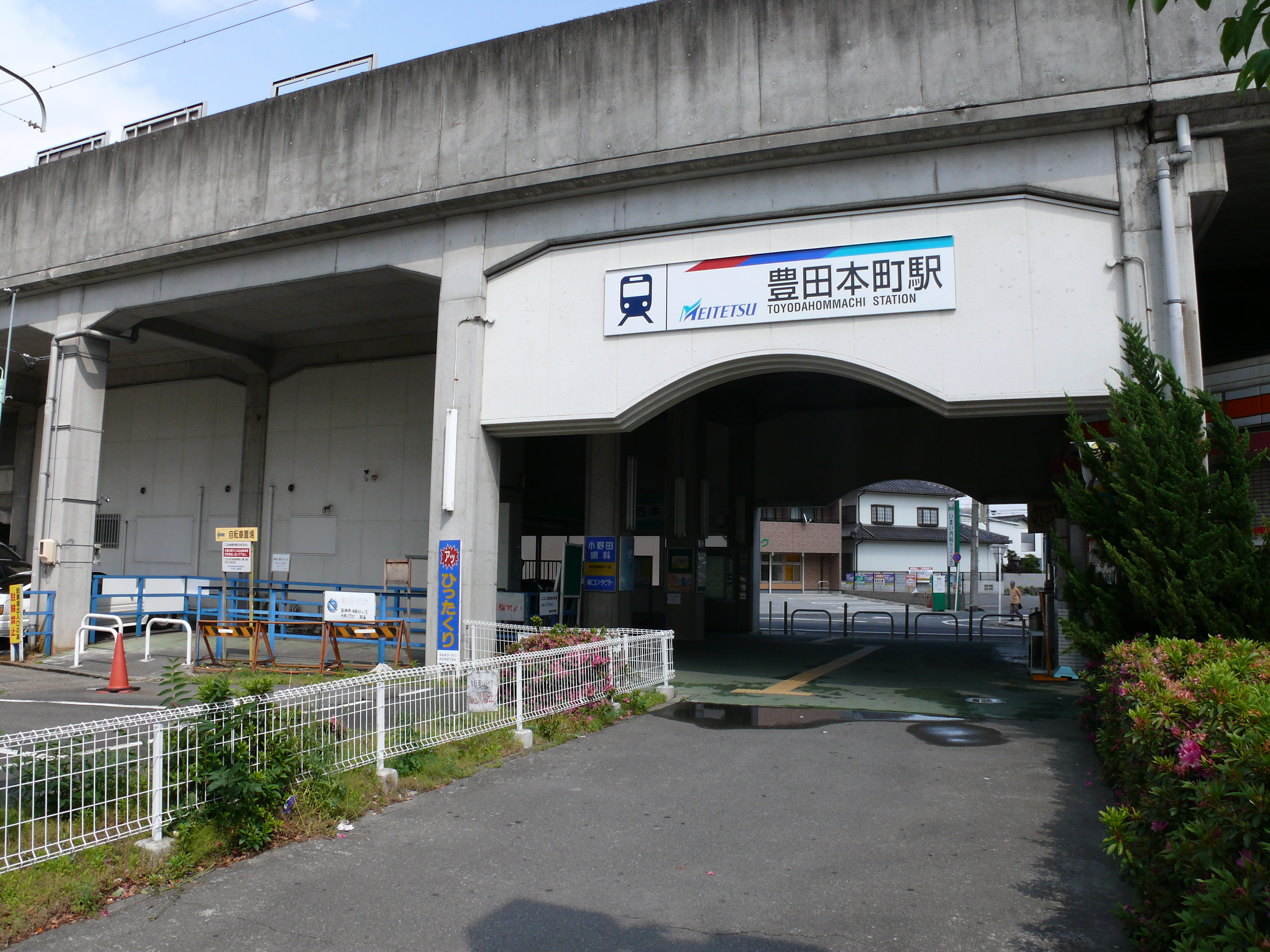
- West gate, May 2007

General information
- Location: Uchidabashi 2-chome, Minami, Nagoya, Aichi （愛知県名古屋市南区内田橋二丁目） Japan
- Operator: Nagoya Railroad
- Line: Tokoname Line
- Platforms: 2 Island platforms
- Tracks: 2

Construction
- Structure type: Elevated
- Cycle facilities: Yes
- Accessible: Yes

History
- Opened: 1957

Passengers
- 2009: 2,042 daily

Services
| Preceding station | Meitetsu | Following station |
|---|---|---|
| Dotoku towards Tokoname | Tokoname Line Local | Jingū-mae through to Nagoya Main Line Terminus |
Location

Toyodahommachi Station (豊田本町駅, Toyodahommachi-eki) is a railway station operated by Meitetsu's Tokoname Line located in Minami Ward, Nagoya, Aichi Prefecture, Japan. It is located 1.4 rail kilometers from the terminus of the line at Jingū-mae Station.

== History ==
Toyodahommachi Station was opened on February 20, 1957. From 1983–1984, the tracks were elevated. On December 10, 2004, the Tranpass system of magnetic fare cards with automatic turnstiles was implemented, and the station has been unattended since that point.

== Lines ==
- Meitetsu
  - Tokoname Line

== Layout ==
Toyoda Honmachi Station has one elevated island platform.

=== Platforms ===
| 1 | ■ Tokoname Line | for Ōtagawa, Tokoname and Central Japan International Airport |
| 2 | ■ Tokoname Line | for Kanayama and Nagoya |
