= Tsurusato Station =

Metro station in Nagoya, Japan

Coordinates: 35.1056°N 136.9433°E

S16 Tsurusato Station 鶴里駅
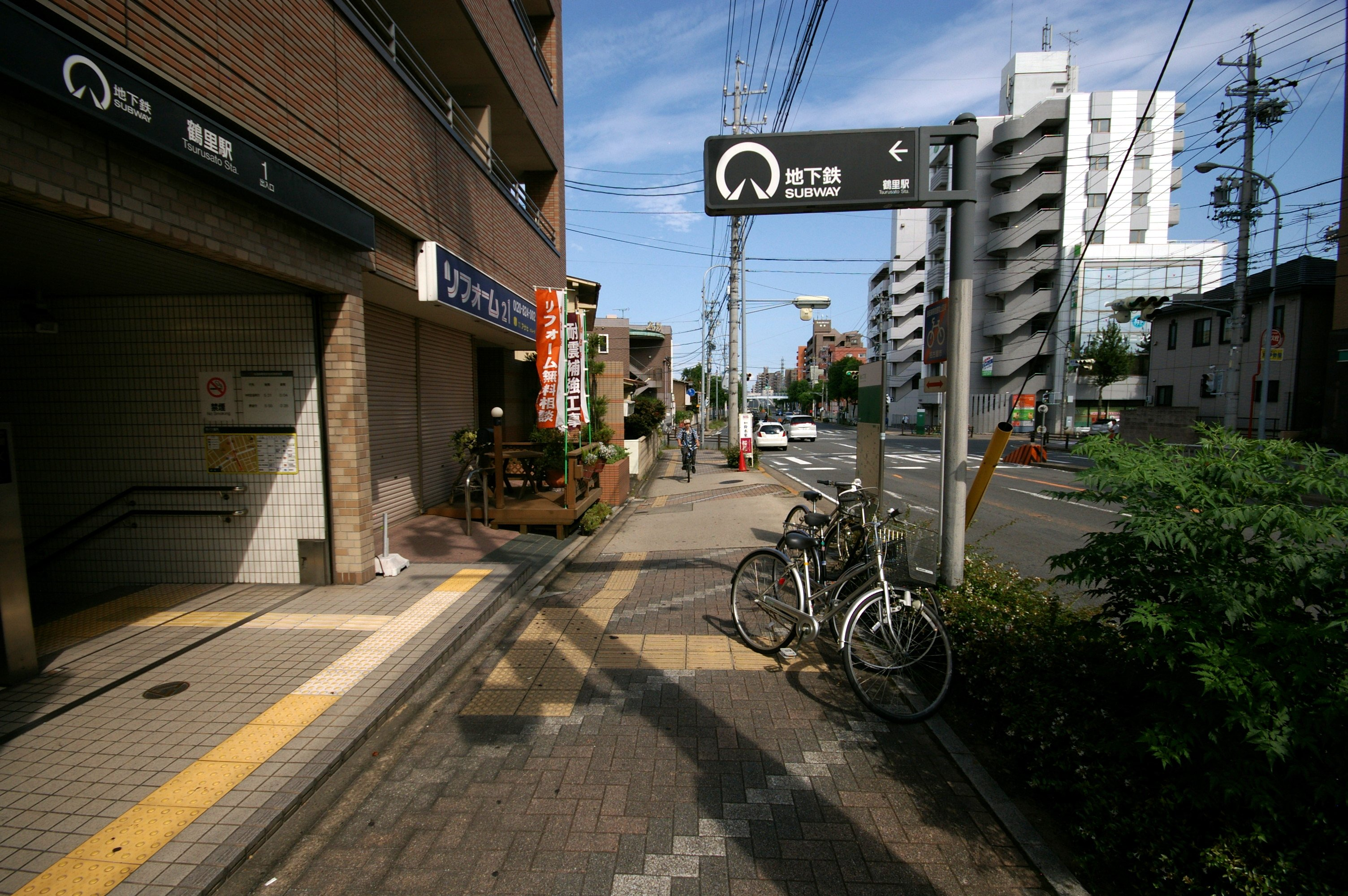

General information
- Location: Taitoritōri 3-18-2, Minami, Nagoya, Aichi （名古屋市南区鯛取通三丁目18-2） Japan
- System: Nagoya Municipal Subway station
- Operator: Transportation Bureau City of Nagoya
- Line: Sakura-dōri Line
- Connections: Bus stop

Other information
- Station code: S16

History
- Opened: March 30, 1994; 32 years ago

Passengers
- 2007: 2,579 daily

Services
Preceding station	Nagoya Municipal Subway	Following station
Sakura-hommachi S15 towards Taiko-dori	Sakura-dōri Line	Nonami S17 towards Tokushige
Location

Tsurusato Station (鶴里駅, Tsurusato-eki) is an underground metro station located in Minami-ku, Nagoya, Aichi, Japan operated by the Nagoya Municipal Subway’s Sakura-dōri Line. It is located 13.8 kilometers from the terminus of the Sakura-dōri Line at Taiko-dori Station.

== History ==
Tsurusato Station was opened on March 30, 1994.

== Lines ==
- Nagoya Municipal Subway
  - Sakura-dōri Line (Station number: S16)

== Layout ==
Tsurusato Station has a single underground island platform with platform screen doors.

=== Platforms ===
1	■ Sakura-dōri Line	For Tokushige
2	■ Sakura-dōri Line	For Imaike, Nagoya, and Taiko-dori
