= Nawa Station (Aichi) =

Railway station in Tōkai, Aichi Prefecture, Japan

Nawa Station 名和駅

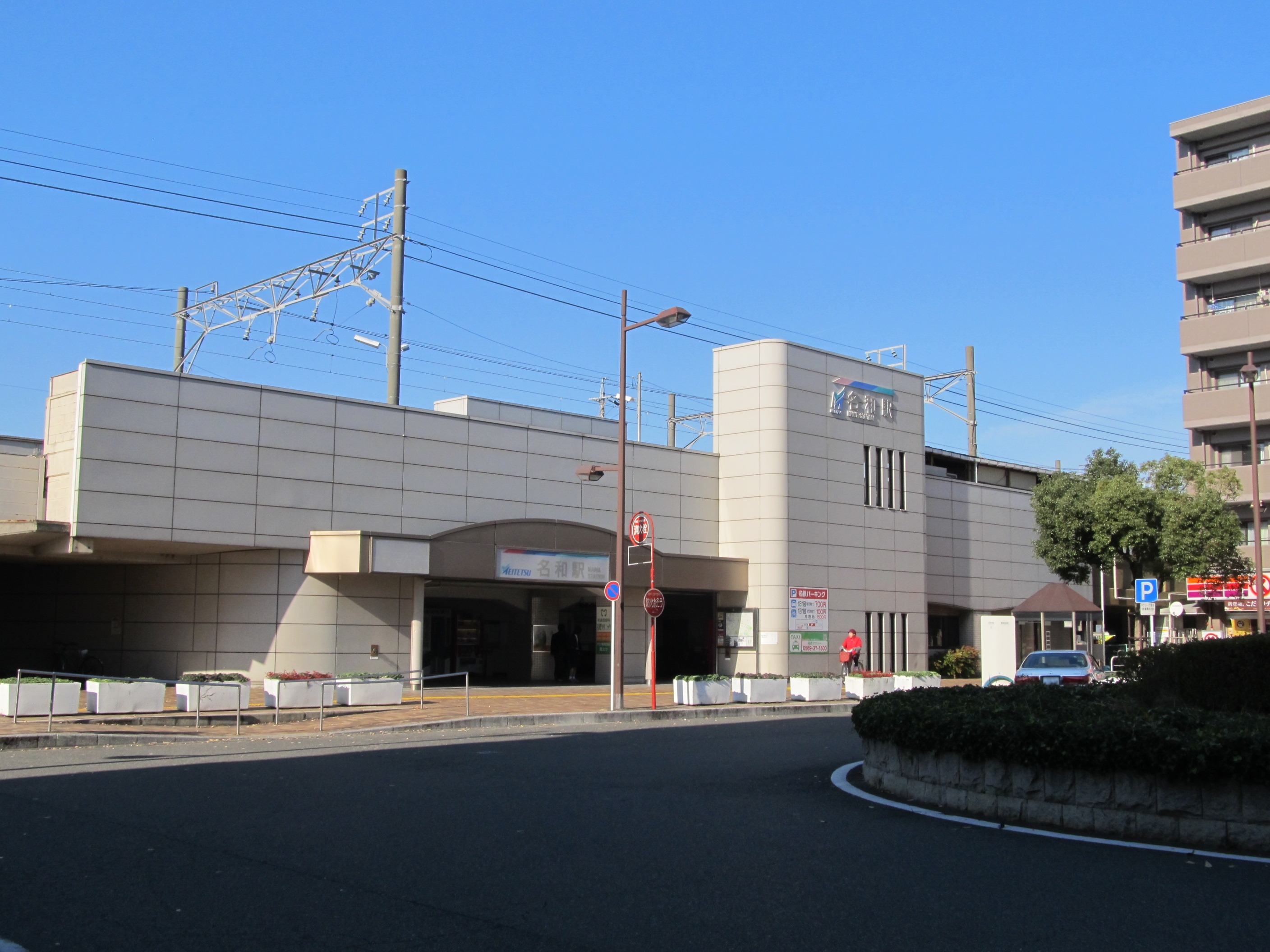
- Nawa Station in November 2014

General information
- Location: Yonbanwari-81-7 Nawamachi, Tōkai-shi, Aichi-ken 476-0002; Japan
- Coordinates: 35.0608°N 136.912°E
- Operator: Meitetsu
- Line: ■ Meitetsu Tokoname Line
- Distance: 7.5 kilometers from Jingū-mae
- Platforms: 2 side platforms

Other information
- Status: Unstaffed
- Station code: TA06
- Website: Official website

History
- Opened: February 18, 1912
- Former names: Nawamura (until 1947)

Passengers
- FY2017: 5515 daily
Location
- Location within Aichi Prefecture Location within Japan

Nawa Station (名和駅, Nawa-eki) is a railway station in the city of Tōkai, Aichi Prefecture, Japan, operated by Meitetsu.

== Lines ==
Nawa Station is served by the Meitetsu Tokoname Line, and is located 7.5 kilometers from the starting point of the line at Jingū-mae.

== Station layout ==
The station has two elevated opposed side platforms, with a station building located underneath. The station has automated ticket machines, Manaca automated turnstiles and is unattended.

=== Platforms ===
1	■ Tokoname Line	For Central Japan International Airport
2	■ Tokoname Line	For Ōtagawa and Meitetsu Nagoya

== Adjacent stations ==
←	Service	→
Meitetsu Tokoname Line
μSKY Limited Express: Does not stop at this station
Limited Express: Does not stop at this station
Rapid Express: Does not stop at this station
Express: Does not stop at this station
Semi Express: Does not stop at this station
Shibata	Local	Shūrakuen

== Station history ==
Nawa Station was opened on February 18, 1912, as Nawamura Station (名和村駅, Nawamura-eki) on the Aichi Electric Railway Company. The Aichi Electric Railway became part of the Meitetsu group on August 1, 1935. The station was renamed to its present name on October 1, 1947. From 1978-1979, the tracks were elevated. In December 2004, the Tranpass system of magnetic fare cards with automatic turnstiles was implemented, and the station has been unattended since that point.

== Passenger statistics ==
In fiscal 2017, the station was used by an average of 5515 passengers daily.

== Surrounding area ==
- Japan National Route 247

== See also ==
- List of railway stations in Japan
