= Daido University =

- 大同大学
- Former names: Daido Institute of Technology
- Type: Private
- Established: 1939
- President: Akira Sawaoka
- Students: 3,440
- Location: Minami-ku, Nagoya, Japan; 35.0784°N 136.9058°E
- Campus: Urban
- Website: www.daido-it.ac.jp/html/english/index.html

Daido University (大同大学, Daidō daigaku) is a coeducational private university in Minami-ku, Nagoya, Aichi Prefecture, Japan.

== History ==
The university began as the Daido Technical-Educational Foundation in 1939. In 1969, the school became the Daido Institute of Technology. The university traces its origin back to the companies founded by Momosuke Fukuzawa. These companies consist of the Great Consolidated Electric Power Company, Limited (current: Kansai Electric Power Company and Chubu Electric Power Co., Inc.), the Nisshinbo Industries, Toho Gas Co., Ltd., Daido Steel Co., Ltd., Toagosei and Nagoya Railroad Co., Ltd. (Meitetsu), etc. He had a concept of a research institute for industrial technician trainings. The president of Daido Steel, Yoshio Shimoide (a member of the Japanese Diet), was inspired by his concept. In January 1939, Daido Technical-Educational Foundation was established by Yoshio Simoide.

The school was close to Daidōchō Station. Responding to strong demand in Nagoya's industrial companies (such as Daido Steel, Chubu Electric Power and Nagoya Railroad), the Daido Institute of Technology was established in 1962.

== President ==
- Akira Sawaoka, senior counselor of JAXA

== Faculty of Engineering ==
- Department of Mechanical Engineering
- Department of Integrated Mechanical Engineering Mechanical System Engineering Course
- Department of Integrated Mechanical Engineering Robotics Course
- Department of Electrical and Electronic Engineering
- Department of Architecture Architecture Course
- Department of Architecture Interior Design Course
- Department of Architecture Civil Engineering and Environmental Design Course

== Faculty of Informatics ==
- Department of Information Systems Computer Science Course
- Department of Information Systems Information Network Course
- Department of Information Design Media Design Course
- Department of Information Design Product Design Course
- Department of Integrated Informatics Odor and Aroma Design Course
- Department of Integrated Informatics Management and Business Information Course

== International exchange ==
- University of Oregon
- Oregon State University
- Politecnico di Milano
- Chinese Academy of Sciences
- University of Copenhagen
- University of Nottingham
- RWTH Aachen University
- Dong-a University
- Thai-Nichi Institute of Technology
