= Minami-ku, Nagoya =

Minami 南区
- Ward
- Minami Ward
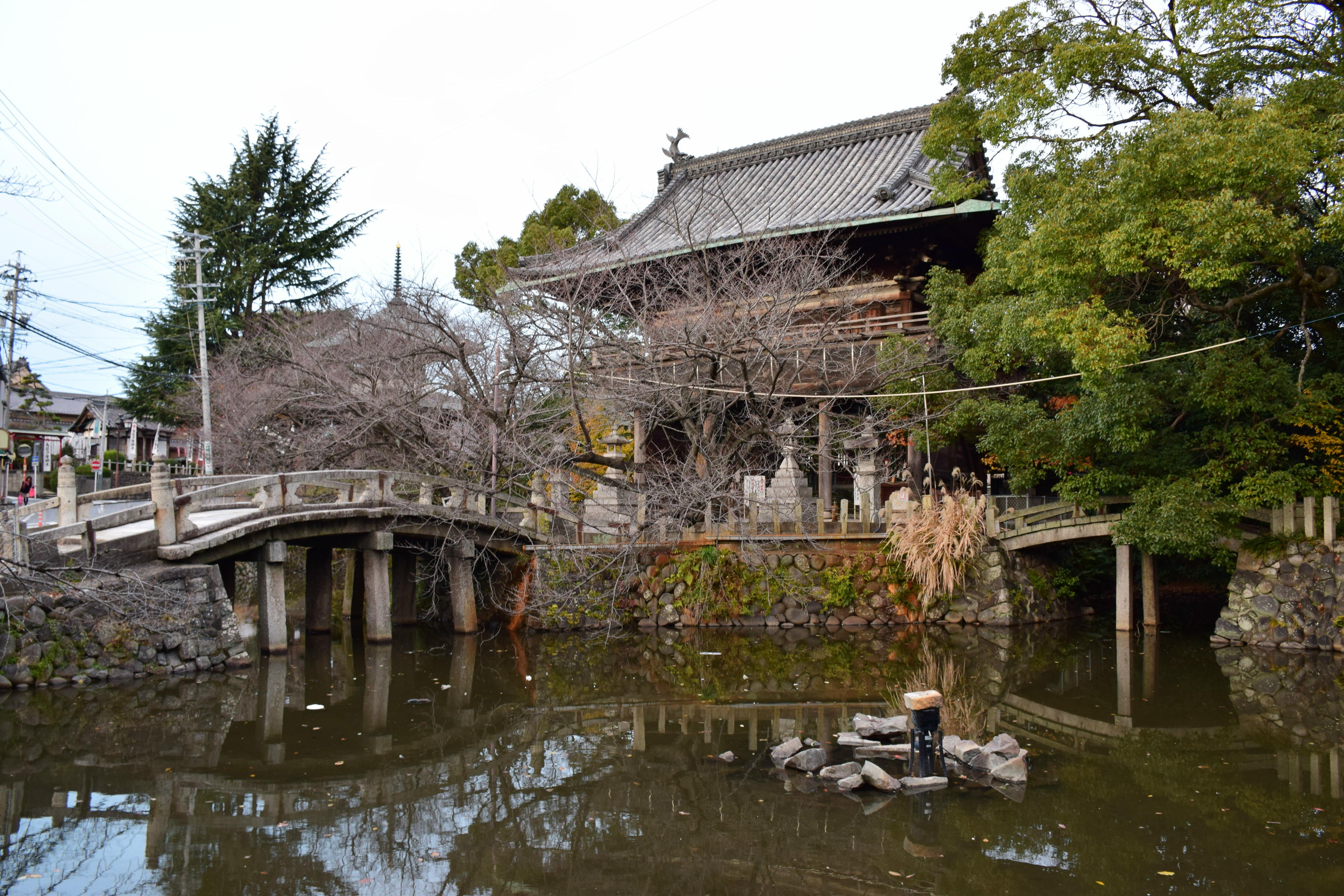
- Ryufuku-ji

- Flag Seal

- Location of Minami-ku in Nagoya

- Coordinates: 35°05′42″N 136°55′52″E
- Country: Japan
- Region: Tōkai region Chūbu region
- Prefecture: Aichi

Area
  - Total: 18.46 km^{2} (7.13 sq mi)

Population (October 1, 2019)
  - Total: 136,015
  - Density: 7,368/km^{2} (19,080/sq mi)
- Time zone: UTC+9 (Japan Standard Time)
- Tree: Cinnamomum camphora
- Flower: Sunflower
- Phone number: 052-811-5161
- Address: 3-10, Maehama-dori, Minami-ku, Nagoya-shi, Aichi-ken 457-8508
- Website: www.city.nagoya.jp/minami/ (in Japanese)

Minami-ku (南区, Minami-ku) is one of the 16 wards of the city of Nagoya in Aichi Prefecture, Japan. As of 1 October 2019, the ward had an estimated population of 136,015 and a population density of 7,368 persons per km^{2}. The total area was 18.46 km^{2}.

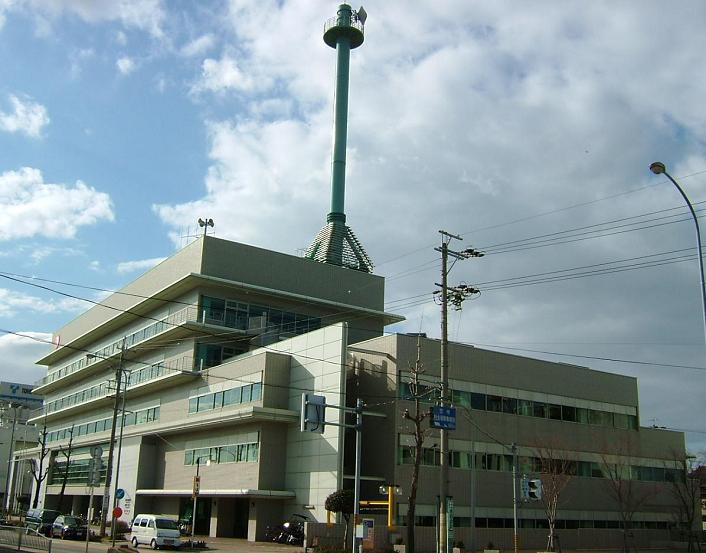
Minami-ku Ward Office

== Geography ==
Minami Ward is the southern portion of the city of Nagoya, in the coastal flatlands near the shore of Ise Bay. Due to land reclamation and the expansion of Minato Ward, Minami Ward no longer has a coastline.

=== Surrounding municipalities ===
- Atsuta Ward
- Tenpaku Ward
- Mizuho Ward
- Midori Ward
- Minato Ward
- Tōkai

== History ==
All of what is now Minami Ward was part of the domains of the Owari Domain during the Edo period (except for two villages which belonged to Imao Domain of Mino Province). After the Meiji Restoration, the area was transferred to the new Nagoya Prefecture, which later became part of Aichi Prefecture. A “Minami Ward” was one of the original wards, with the division of the city of Nagoya into wards on April 1, 1908; however, none of present-day Minami Ward was within the geographical extent of the original Minami Ward. On August 22, 1922, Minami Ward annexed the neighboring town of Yobitsuki and the village Kasadera from Aichi District. On October 1, 1937 the city of Nagoya was re-divided into ten wards, with the original Minami Ward divided into the new Minami Ward, plus Atsuta Ward, Nakagawa Ward, Minato Ward, and part of Showa Ward. In 1959, the Isewan Typhoon caused severe damage to the area.

== Economy ==
Minami Ward was traditionally known for its production of sea salt and edible seaweed (green laver). During the post-World War II period, the area developed into a center for heavy industry, including a large factory operated by Mitsubishi Motors. The Mitsubishi plant closed in the year 2000.

== Education ==
- Daido University

== Transportation ==
=== Railroads ===
- Central Japan Railway Company - Tōkaidō Main Line
  - Kasadera
- Meitetsu - Nagoya Main Line
  - Moto-Hoshizaki -Moto-Kasadera -Sakura

Yobitsugi

- Meitetsu - Tokoname Line
  - Toyoda Honmachi - Dōtoku - Ōe - Daidōchō - Shibata
- Nagoya Municipal Subway – Sakura-dōri Line
  - Sakura-hommachi – Tsurusato

=== Highways ===
- Nagoya Expressway
- Japan National Route 1
- Japan National Route 23
- Japan National Route 247

== Local attractions ==
- Nippon Gaishi Hall
- Kasadera Kannon
- Nagoya City Miharashidai Archaeological Museum

== Noted people from Midori Ward, Nagoya ==
- Naomi Tamura – singer, songwriter
- Maiko Itō - actress
- Wataru Ito – politician
