= Shūrakuen Station =

Railway station in Tōkai, Aichi Prefecture, Japan

Shūrakuen Station 聚楽園駅

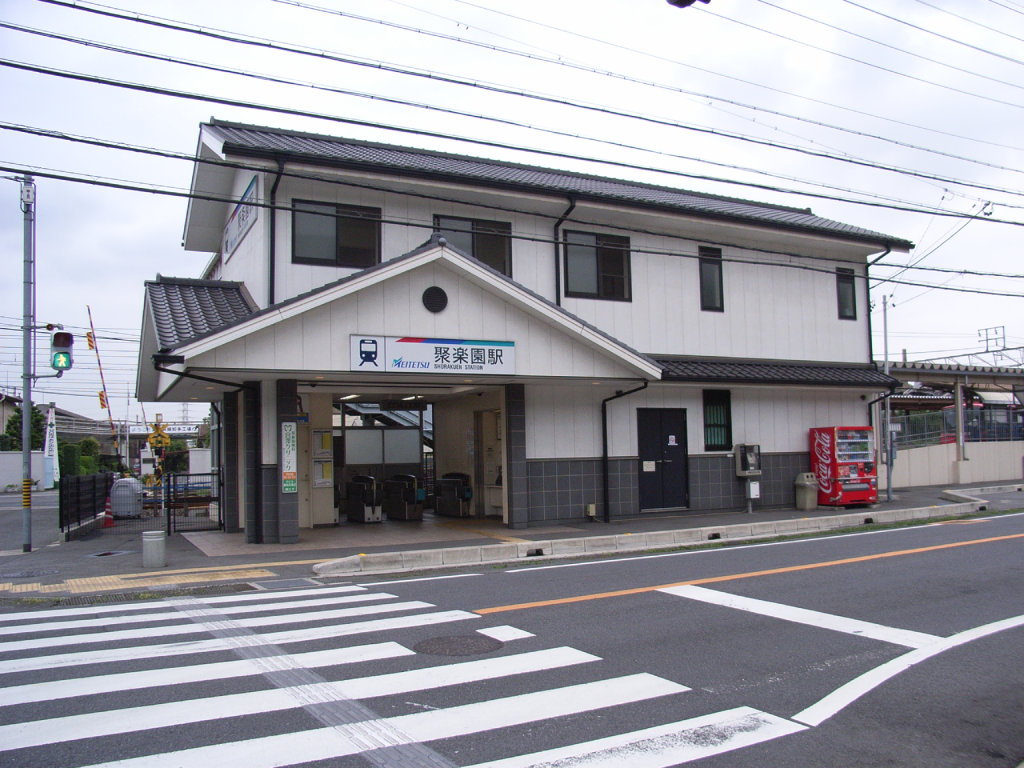
- Shurakuen Station building, 2007

General information
- Location: Rinowari-235-3 Araomachi, Tokai-shi, Aichi-ken 476-0003; Japan
- Coordinates: 35.0430°N 136.9029°E
- Operator: Meitetsu
- Line: ■ Meitetsu Tokoname Line
- Distance: 9.7 kilometers from Jingū-mae
- Platforms: 1 island + side platform

Other information
- Status: Staffed
- Station code: TA07
- Website: Official website

History
- Opened: May 10, 1917

Passengers
- FY2017: 6314 daily
Location
- Location within Aichi Prefecture Location within Japan

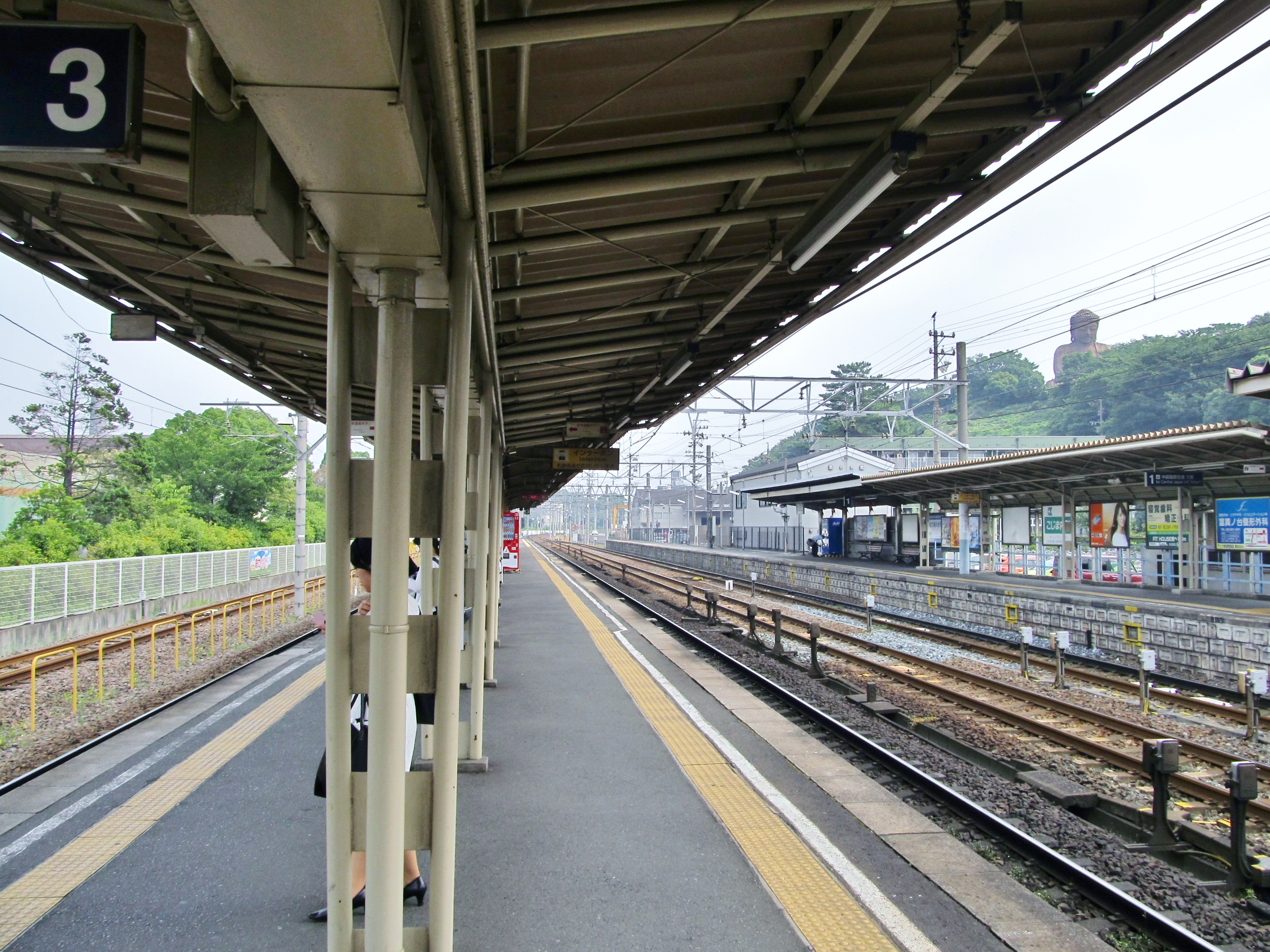
Platforms

Track Layout

Shūrakuen Station (聚楽園駅, Shūrakuen-eki) is a railway station in the city of Tōkai, Aichi Prefecture, Japan, operated by Meitetsu.

== Lines ==
Shūrakuen Station is served by the Meitetsu Tokoname Line, and is located 9.7 kilometers from the starting point of the line at Jingū-mae.

== Station layout ==
The station has one island platform, and one side platform, serving four tracks (Track 2 is for through traffic, and has no platform). The station has automated ticket machines, Manaca automated turnstiles and is staffed.

=== Platforms ===
1	■ Tokoname Line	For Ōtagawa, Tokoname, Chita Handa, and Central Japan International Airport
Passing	■ Tokoname Line	For Ōtagawa, Tokoname, Chita Handa, and Central Japan International Airport
3	■ Tokoname Line	For Jingū-mae and Meitetsu Nagoya
4	■ Tokoname Line	For Jingū-mae and Meitetsu Nagoya

== Adjacent stations ==
←	Service	→
Meitetsu Tokoname Line
μSKY Limited Express (ミュースカイ): Does not stop at this station
Limited Express (特急): Does not stop at this station
Ōe	Rapid Express (快速急行) (partially)	Ōtagawa
Ōe	Express (急行) (partially)	Ōtagawa
Ōe	Semi Express (準急)	Ōtagawa
Nawa	Local (普通)	Shin Nittetsu-mae

== Station history ==
Shūrakuen Station was opened on May 10, 1917 as a station on the Aichi Electric Railway Company. The Aichi Electric Railway became part of the Meitetsu group on August 1, 1935. In December 2004, the Tranpass system of magnetic fare cards with automatic turnstiles was implemented.

== Passenger statistics ==
In fiscal 2017, the station was used by an average of 6314 passengers daily.

== Surrounding area ==
- Shūrakuen Park

== See also ==
- List of railway stations in Japan
