= Daedong College =

College in Busan, South Korea

Coordinates: 35°13′45.1″N 129°05′44.7″E

- 대동대학교
- Type: Private
- Established: 1971; 55 years ago
- President: Min Gyeong-hwa (민경화)
- Location: Busan, South Korea

- Daedong College
- Hangul: 대동대학교
- Hanja: 大同大學校
- RR: Daedong daehakgyo
- MR: Taedong taehakkyo

Daedong College is a private technical college in Busan, the second-largest city in South Korea. Its campus lies in the district of Geumjeong-gu. About 50 instructors are employed. It consists of one big building that looks like some high schools.

== Academics ==
The college's academic offerings are divided among nine departments: Nursing, Department of Paramedicine, Dental Hygiene, Rehabilitation Care Welfare, Department of Hotel Culinary Arts & Bakery, Hotel Sommelier & Barista, BeautyHairDesign, Food&Dessert Start-up, NewMusic.

== History ==
The college opened in 1971 as Daedong Nursing School (대동간호학교). It became a junior college (대동간호전문대학) in 1979, and a full college in 1998. Academic offerings were first broadened beyond nursing in 1996, with the establishment of the Department of Cosmetology.

== Sister schools ==
International ties exist with University of Santo Tomas in the Philippines, and with Shanghai Normal University in China.

== See also ==
- Education in South Korea
- List of colleges and universities in South Korea
