= Chita Handa Station =

Railway station in Handa, Aichi Prefecture, Japan

Chita Handa Station 知多半田駅

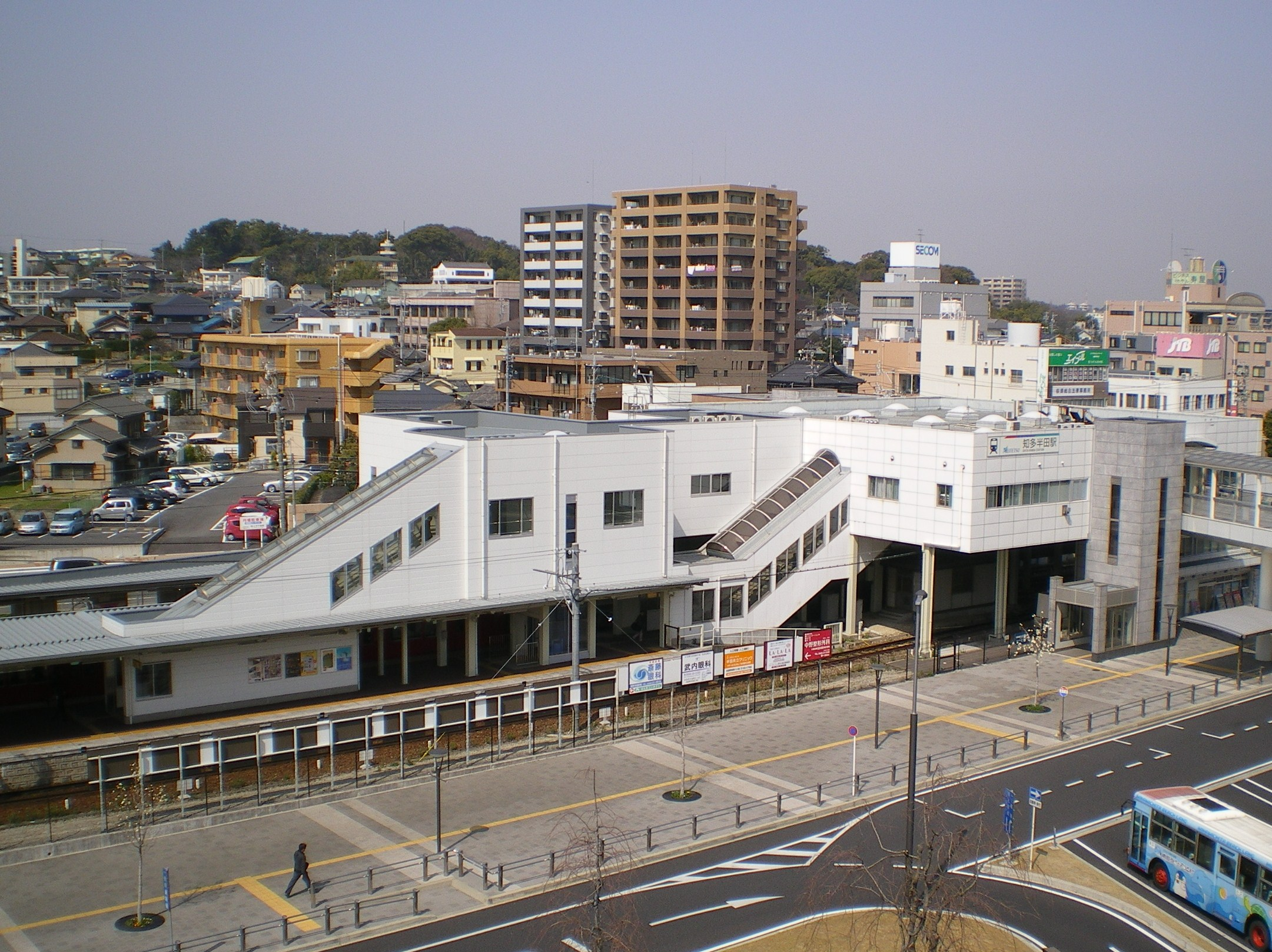
- Chita Handa Station in March 2010

General information
- Location: 128- Hirokōji-chō, Handa-shi, Aichi-ken 475-0857; Japan
- Coordinates: 34.8940°N 136.9263°E
- Operator: Meitetsu
- Line: Kōwa Line
- Distance: 14.8 kilometers from Ōtagawa
- Platforms: 1 island + side platforms

Other information
- Status: Staffed
- Station code: KC12
- Website: Official website

History
- Opened: April 1, 1931

Passengers
- FY2018: 6029 daily

Services
Preceding station	Meitetsu	Following station
Aoyama towards Kōwa	Kōwa Line Limited Express	Agui towards Ōtagawa
Narawa towards Kōwa	Kōwa Line Rapid Express Express Semi-Express Local	Sumiyoshichō towards Ōtagawa
Location
- Location within Aichi Prefecture Location within Japan

Track layout

Chita Handa Station (知多半田駅, Chita Handa-eki) is a railway station in the city of Handa, Aichi Prefecture, Japan, operated by Meitetsu.

== Lines ==
Chita Handa Station is served by the Meitetsu Kōwa Line, and is located 14.8 kilometers from the starting point of the line at Ōtagawa.

== Station layout ==
Chita Handa Station has three tracks and two platforms - a western side platform (Track 3) and central island platform (Tracks 1 and 2). The station has a pedestrian overpass facilitating access to the platforms from both sides. The station is staffed.

=== Platforms ===
1	■ Meitetsu Kōwa Line	For Kōwa, and Utsumi; For Ōtagawa and Meitetsu Nagoya
2	■ Meitetsu Kōwa Line	For Kōwa and Utsumi
3	■ Meitetsu Kōwa Line	For Ōtagawa and Meitetsu Nagoya

== Station history ==
Chita Handa Station was opened on April 1, 1931 as a station on the Chita Railway. The Chita Railway became part of the Meitetsu group on February 2, 1943. A new station building was completed in December 1988. In July 2006, the Tranpass system of magnetic fare cards with automatic turnstiles was implemented.

== Passenger statistics ==
In fiscal 2018, the station was used by an average of 6029 passengers daily (boarding passengers only).

== Surrounding area ==
- Handa Commercial High School
- CLACITY HANDA
- former Nakano residence

== See also ==
- List of railway stations in Japan
