= Nomazaki Lighthouse =

Nomazaki Lighthouse Noma Saki 野間埼灯台
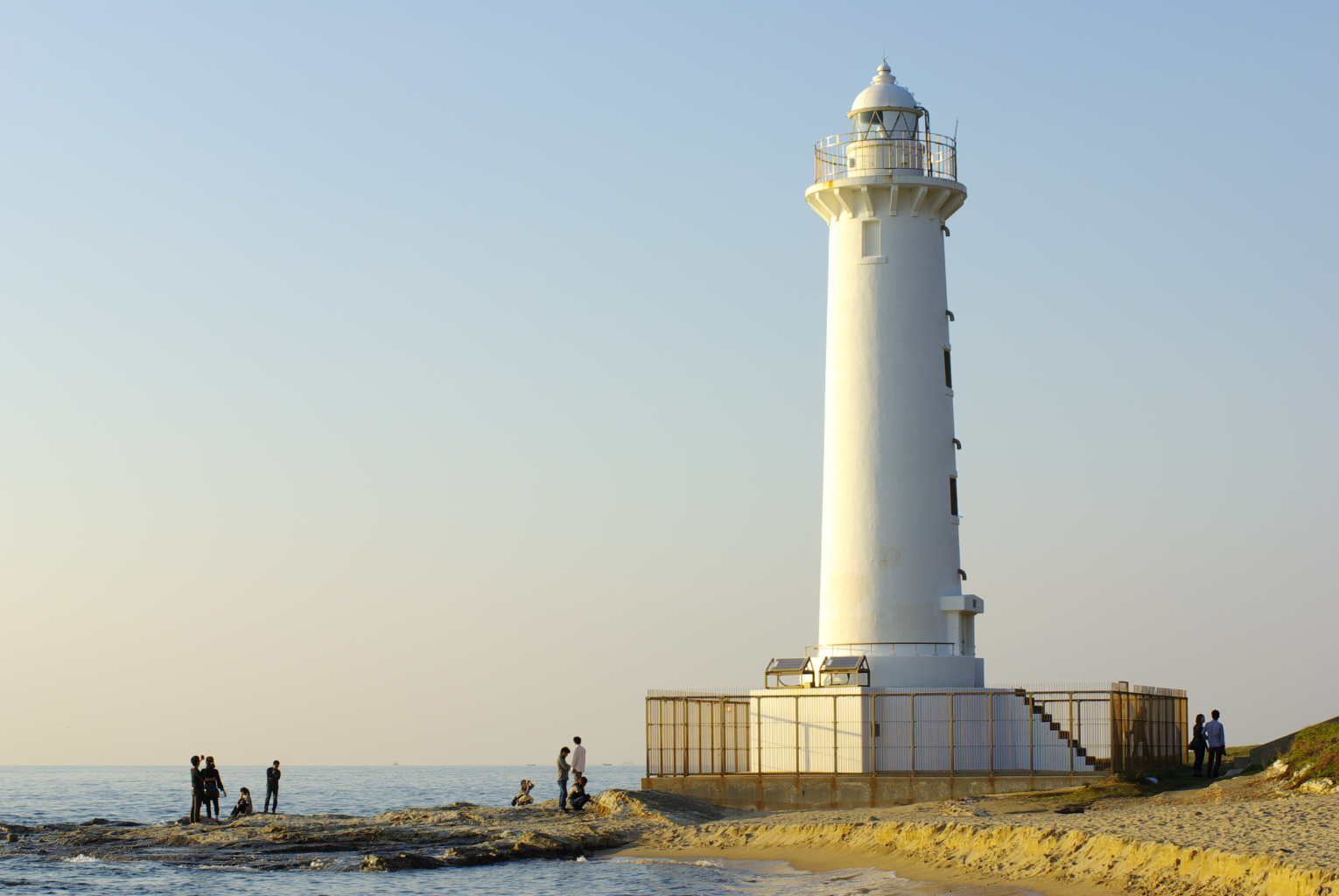
- Location: Mihama, Aichi; Japan
- Coordinates: 34°45′28.0″N 136°50′40.1″E

Tower
- Constructed: October 3, 1921
- Foundation: concrete
- Construction: concrete tower
- Height: 20 metres (66 ft)
- Shape: tapered cylindrical tower with balcony and lantern
- Markings: white tower and lantern
- Heritage: Registered Tangible Cultural Property of Japan

Light
- Focal height: 17.9 metres (59 ft)
- Lens: Fifth Order Fresnel (original), LED (current)
- Intensity: 15,000 candela
- Range: 13.5 nautical miles (25.0 km; 15.5 mi)
- Characteristic: Iso W 6s
- Japan no.: JCG-2632

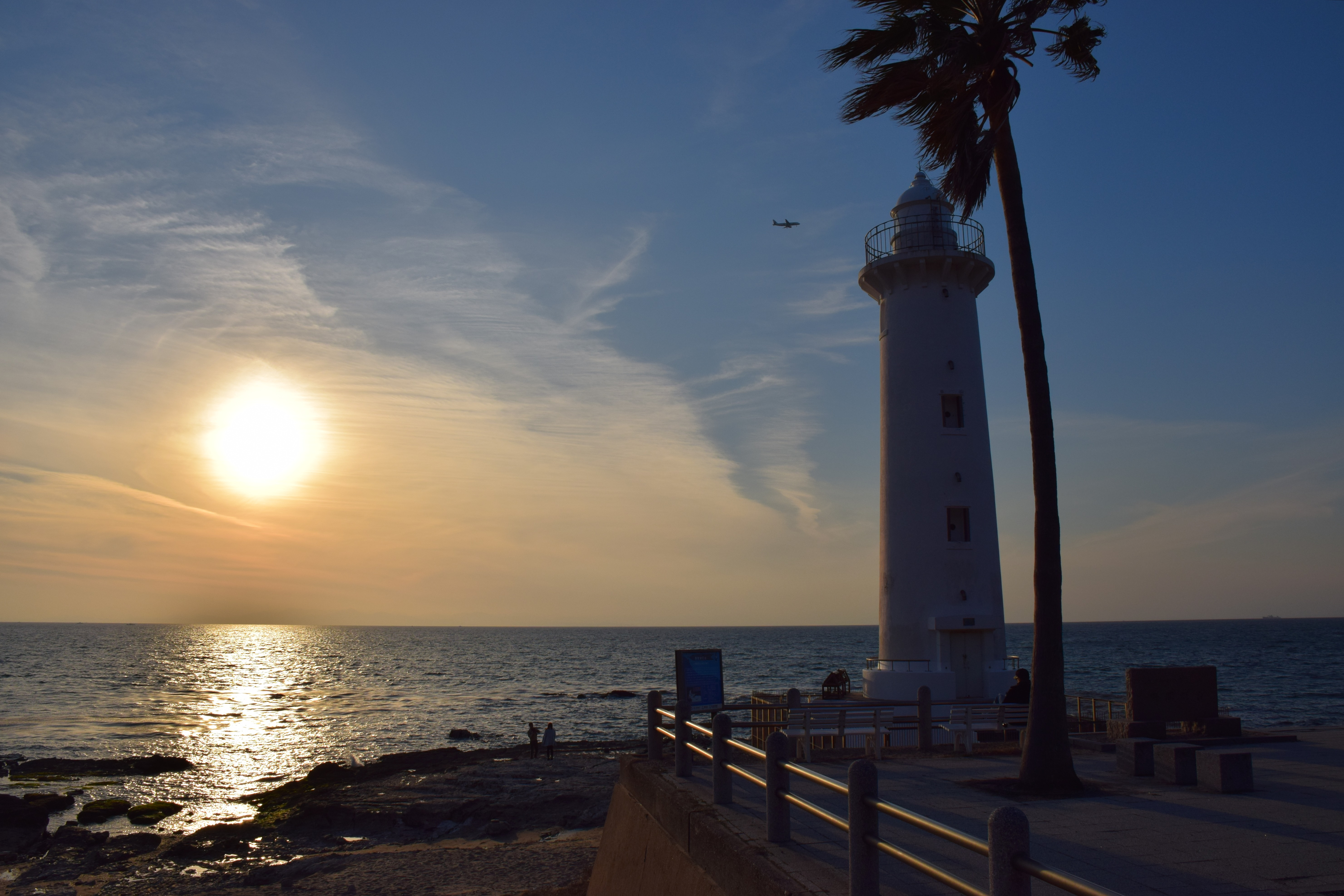
Setting Sun and Nomazaki Lighthouse

Nomazaki Lighthouse (野間埼灯台, Nomazaki tōdai) or just Noma Lighthouse is a lighthouse in town of Mihama, Chita District, Aichi, Japan built during the Taishō period, located on Chita Peninsula in Mikawa Bay.

== History ==
Noma Lighthouse was lit on March 10, 1921, and is the oldest lighthouse in Aichi Prefecture. In 2008, the lighthouse was extensively renovated, with its lens replaced by a 5th order Fresnel lens and light source replaced by LEDs. As a result, its output was decreased from approximately 15,000 candela to only 590 candela and effective range reduced from approximately 25 kilometers to 15 kilometers. The former lens is now on display at the museum at Daiōzaki Lighthouse in Mie Prefecture.

== Lock Superstition ==
Noma Lighthouse in popular superstition was held to be a place that jinxed romance. However, there is a belief that if a couple attaches a padlock to the fence surrounding this lighthouse, their love will prosper. The lighthouse is surrounded by a 2-meter high steel fence but, as result of locks accumulating, the fence has collapsed on several occasions due to the weight. In the year 2000, Mihama Town declared the area around the lighthouse to be a park, and the Koinomizu Shrine (恋の水神社, Koinomizu Jinja) established a small branch near the fence to receive the padlocks instead. In October 2011, the Nihon Fukushi University, also based in Mihama, set up a railing, designed as a musical score, as a place to also affix the padlocks.

== See also ==
- List of lighthouses in Japan
