= The Mountain Plaza =

Open-air theater

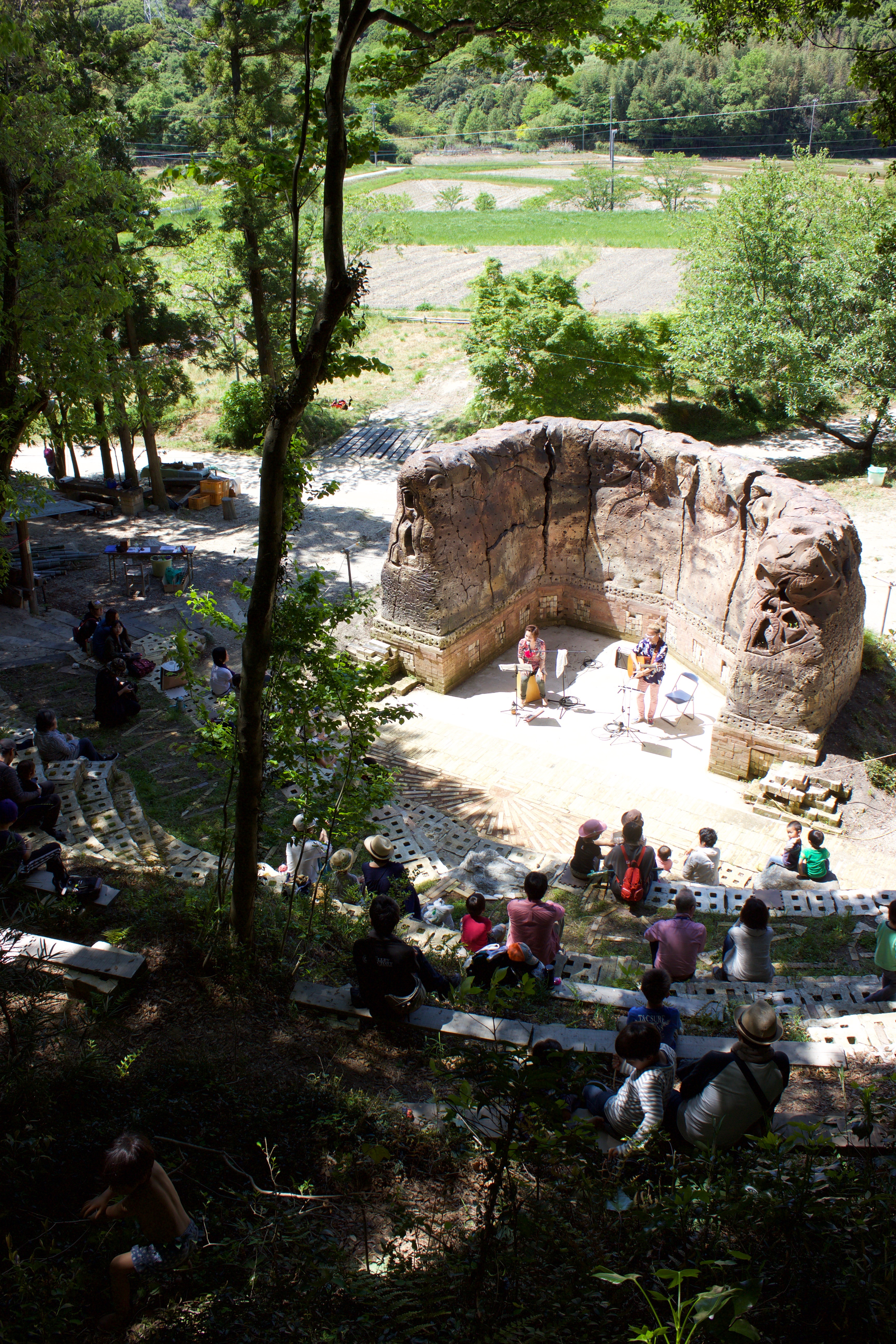
- Location: Mihama, Aichi Prefecture, Japan

Construction
- Opened: 2016
- Architect: Elgueda Ward Studio

Website
- www.yamanohiroba.com

The Mountain Plaza Ceramic Amphitheater Art Center (山の広場) is a ceramic installation and open-air theater located in Mihama, Aichi Prefecture, Japan.

== Planning ==
The foundation of The Mountain Plaza was laid in 2000 by two artists, Ximena Elgueda from Latin America and Steven Ward from the United States. Both artists migrated to Japan in the 1990s to study ceramics. They met in Shiga Prefecture in 1996 and later delved into the collaboration of ceramic sculptures and language teaching in Japan. In 1999, Ximena Elgueda and Steven Ward were both honored with the Tokoname Honours of Cultural Merit awards. Between 2005 and 2006, they served as chief editors for a Cultural Guide to the city of Tokoname.

Two notable experiences influenced Elgueda and Ward's approach to public art. In January 2000, they visited the stone amphitheater at Parque la Llovizna in Puerto Ordaz, Venezuela. The following month, they observed a hollowed-out old-growth tree in Phoenix Lake, Marin County, California. From these visits, they considered the idea of creating public spaces using ceramics, aiming to transcend traditional ceramic boundaries. In 2000, they attended an open-air concert in Mihama's mountains. Observing the event, Elgueda and Ward considered developing a community space using ceramics. Consequently, in 2000, they proposed The Mountain Plaza project to Tsuyoshi Sugiura, an organic rice farmer near Tokoname, who graciously allowed them to construct a 60-tonne ceramic acoustic wall on his land.

== Construction ==
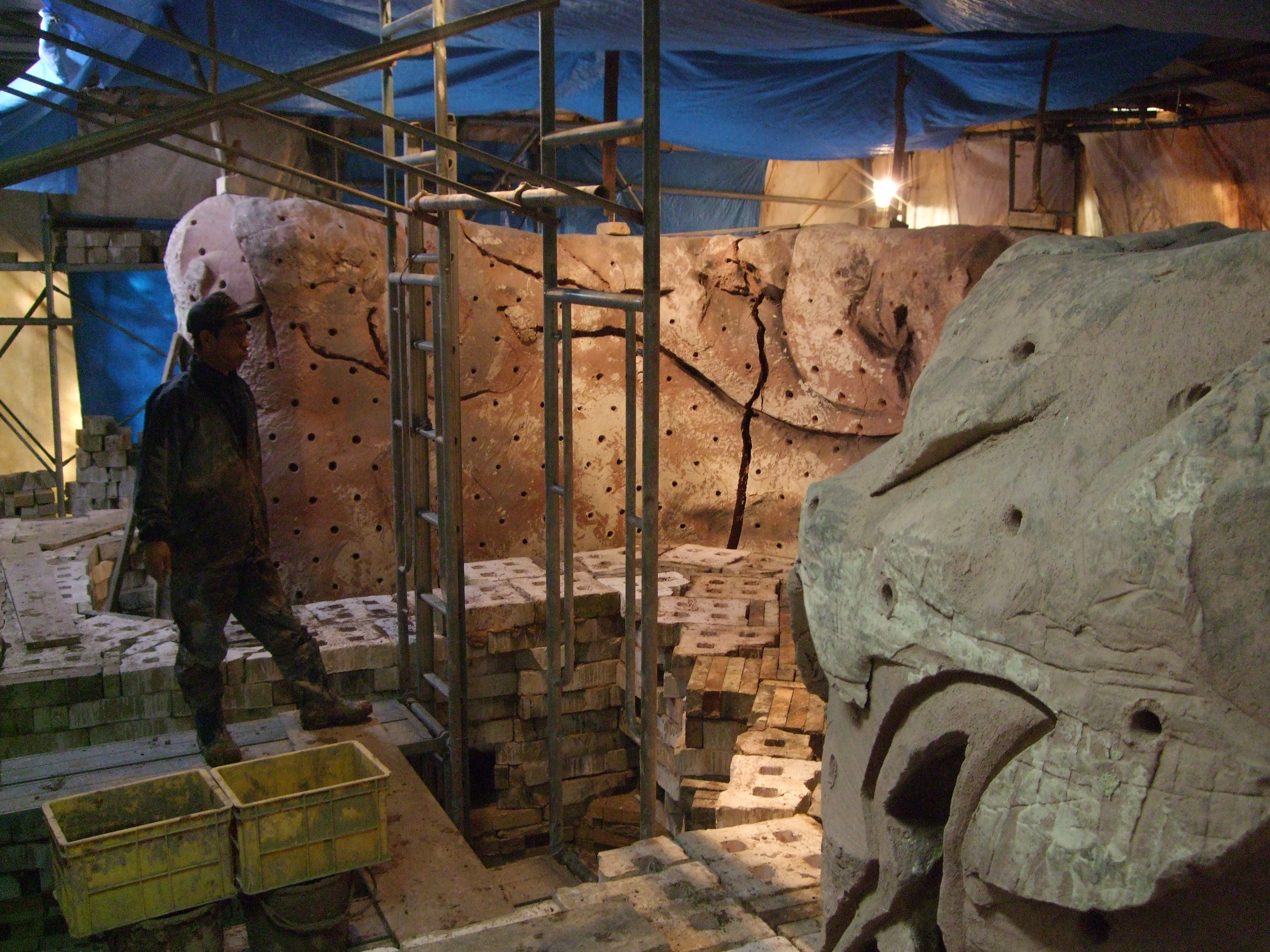
Building kiln around raw clay

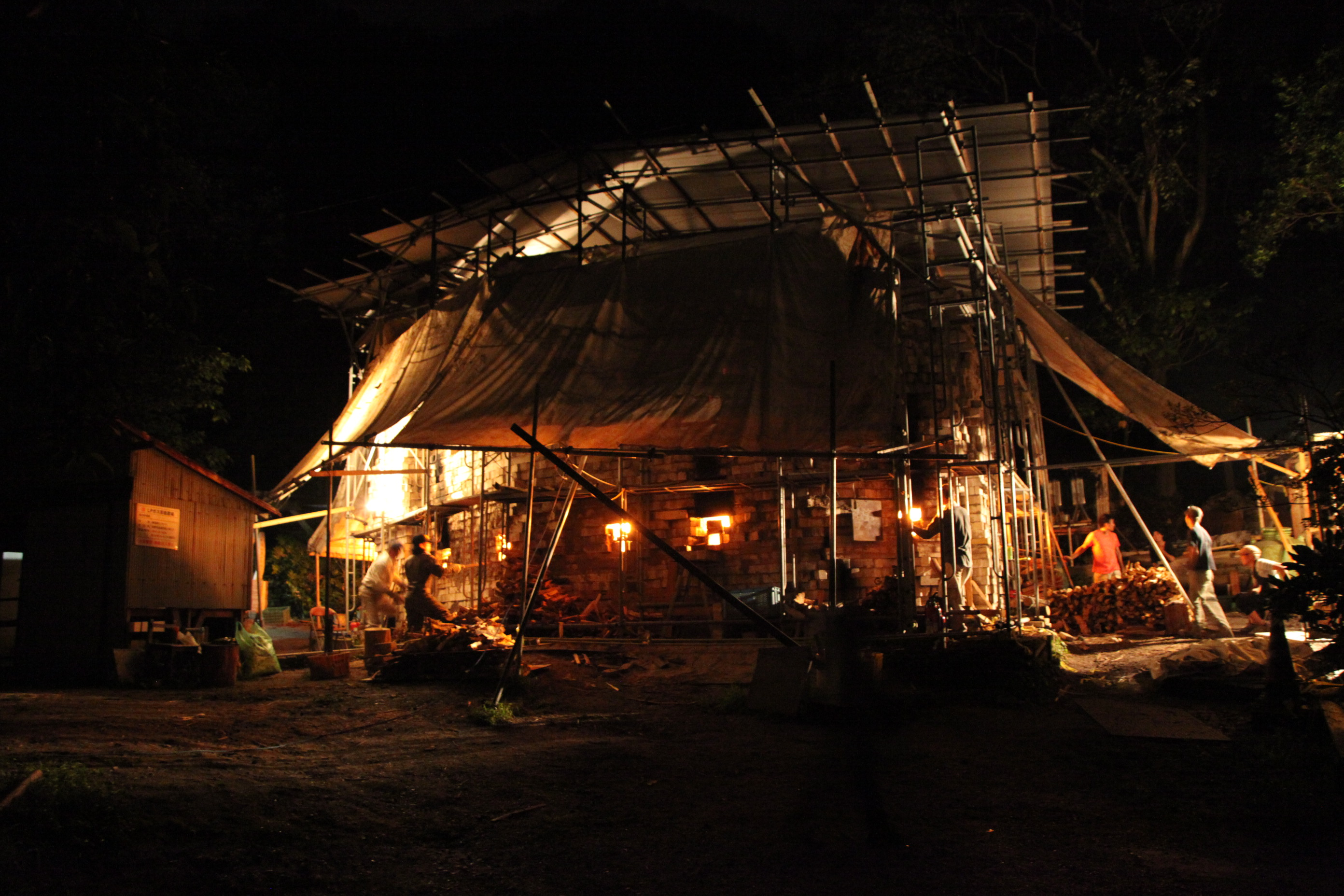
Firing the kiln

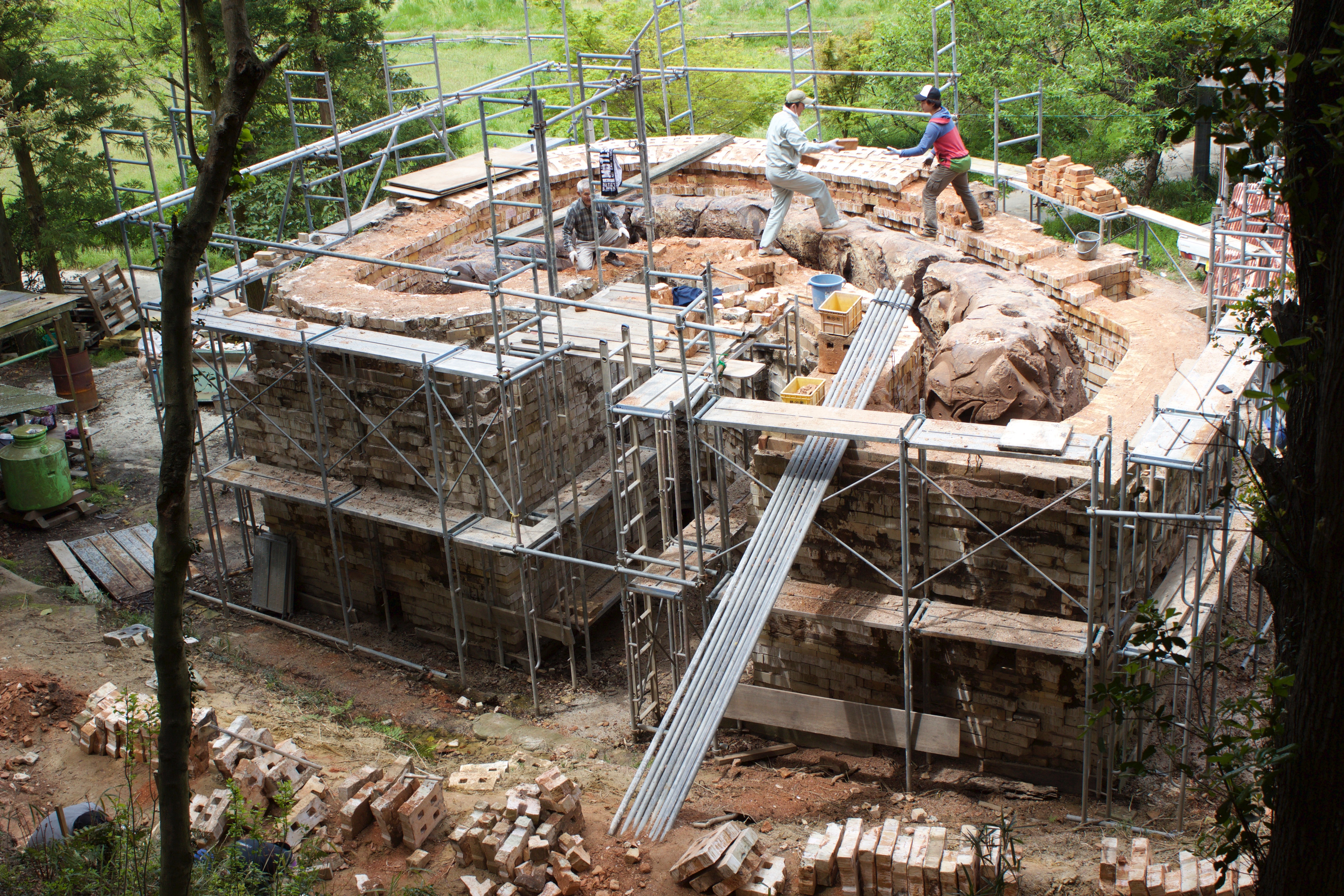
Dismantling the kiln

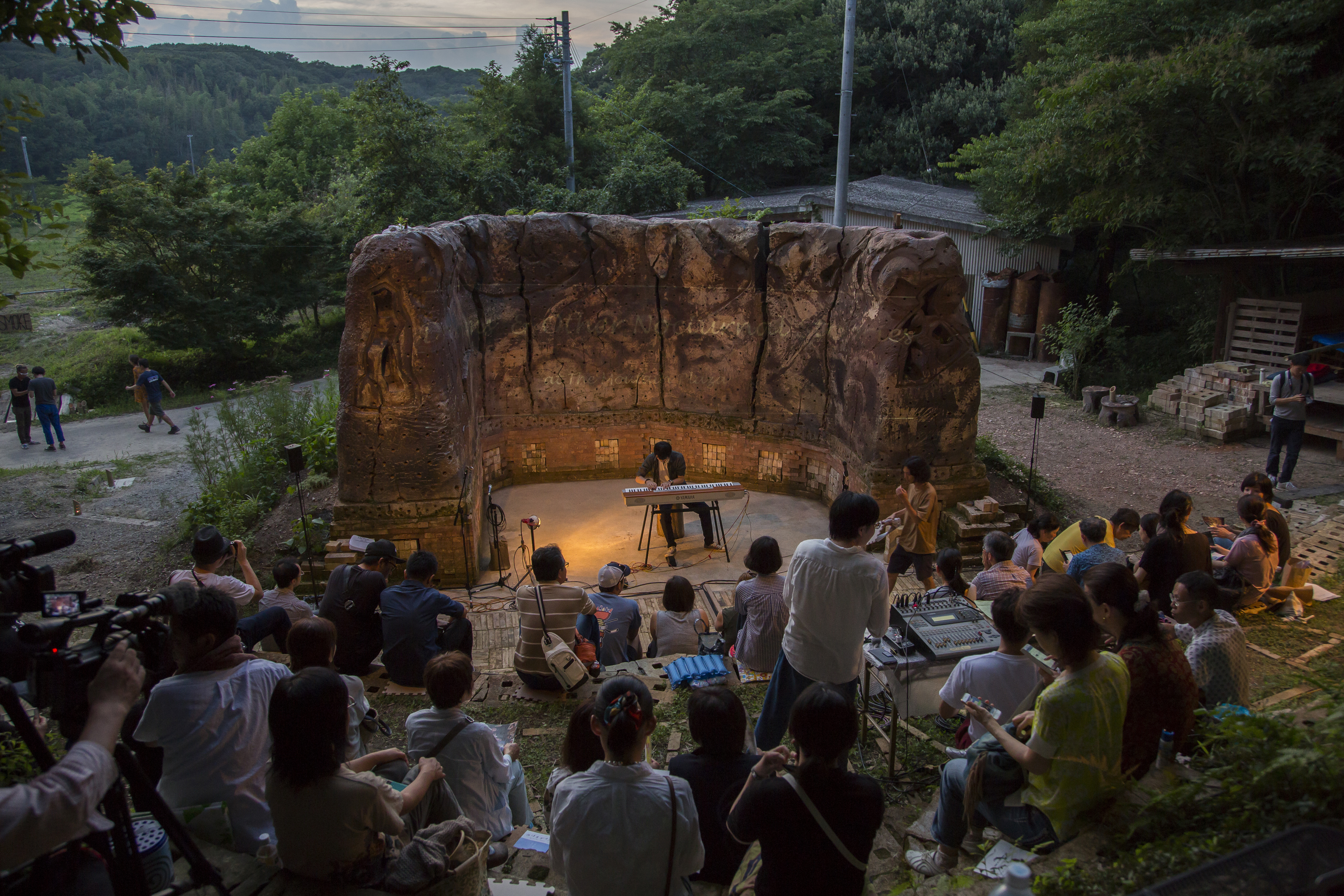
The Mountain Plaza during an event

Though the construction was initially estimated to span three years, it faced multiple challenges. The creation of the acoustic shell, measuring 3.5m x 7.4m x 6m, took 2½ years. During its development, approximately 2,000 local volunteers offered intermittent assistance. Bricks sourced from a pipe company in Taketoyo were used to encase the shell, a task complicated by the bricks' 28 kg weight.

In 2012, Elgueda and Ward moved from Tokoname to Mihama to focus on the project.

By August 2014, a kiln consisting of 200 tons of bricks was built around the shell and fired for 40 days, reaching a temperature of 1200 C. The kiln was dismantled by 2015, and the bricks were used to create the seating for the amphitheater.

In October 2016, The Mountain Plaza was officially completed. Since its completion, the space has hosted various international events, including those related to music, art, nature, and design. The venue operates on a non-profit basis.

== Finished layout ==
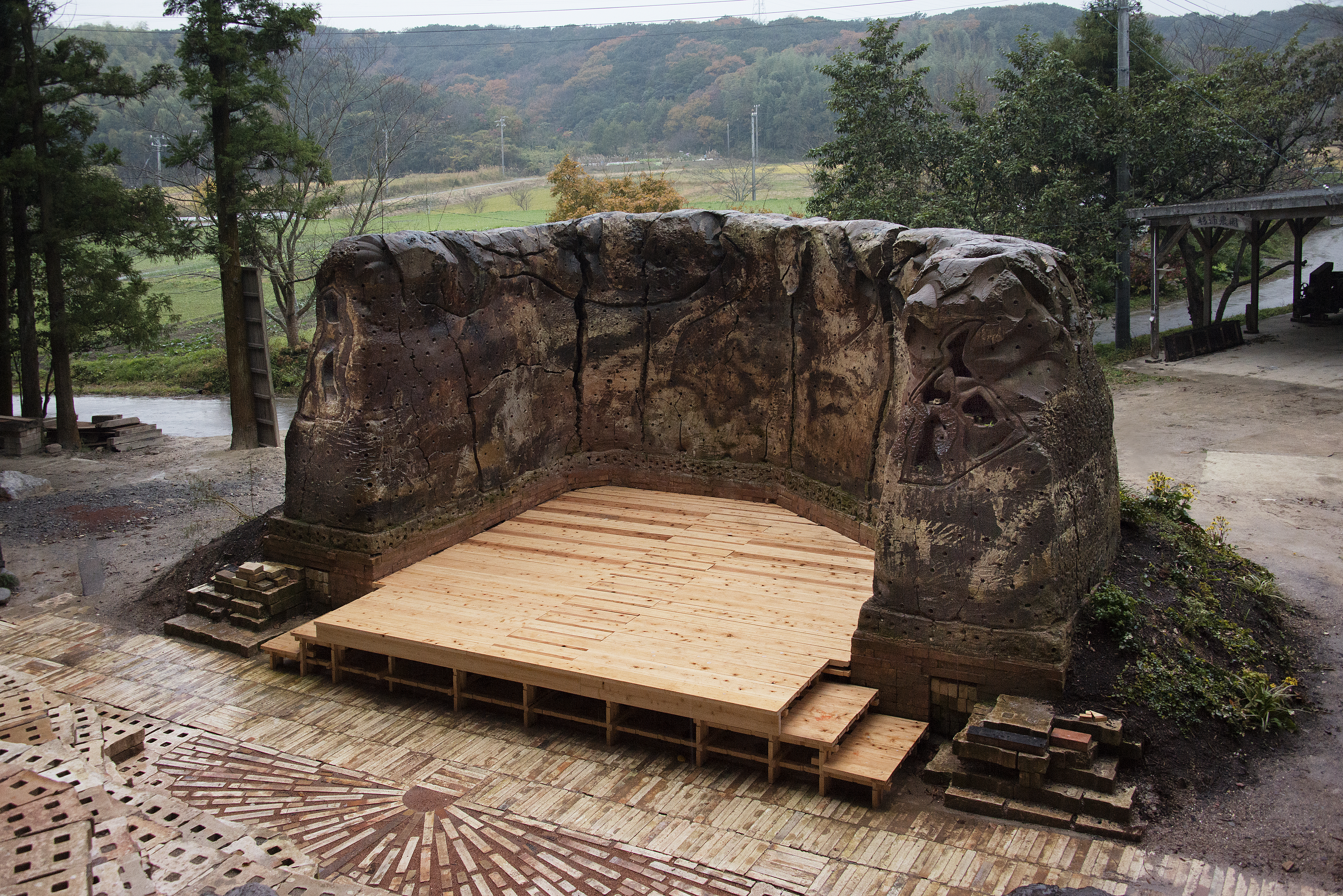
Overview of The Mountain Plaza

The Mountain Plaza consists of two main parts: the stage and the audience seating. The stage's soundboard is made from approximately 60 tons of fired clay. Its dimensions are 3.6m high, 7.5m wide, 13m long, and 4.8m deep.
