= Kenkichi Sugimoto =

Japanese artist

Kenkichi Sugimoto (杉本健吉) (September 20, 1905 in Nagoya – February 10, 2004 in Nagoya) was a Japanese artist. He was known as an oil painter, illustrator, and graphic designer.

In 1987 the Meitetsu railroad company opened the Sugimoto Art Museum in Mihama, Aichi.
