= Sugimoto Art Museum =

Coordinates: 34.8019°N 136.8663°E

- 杉本美術館
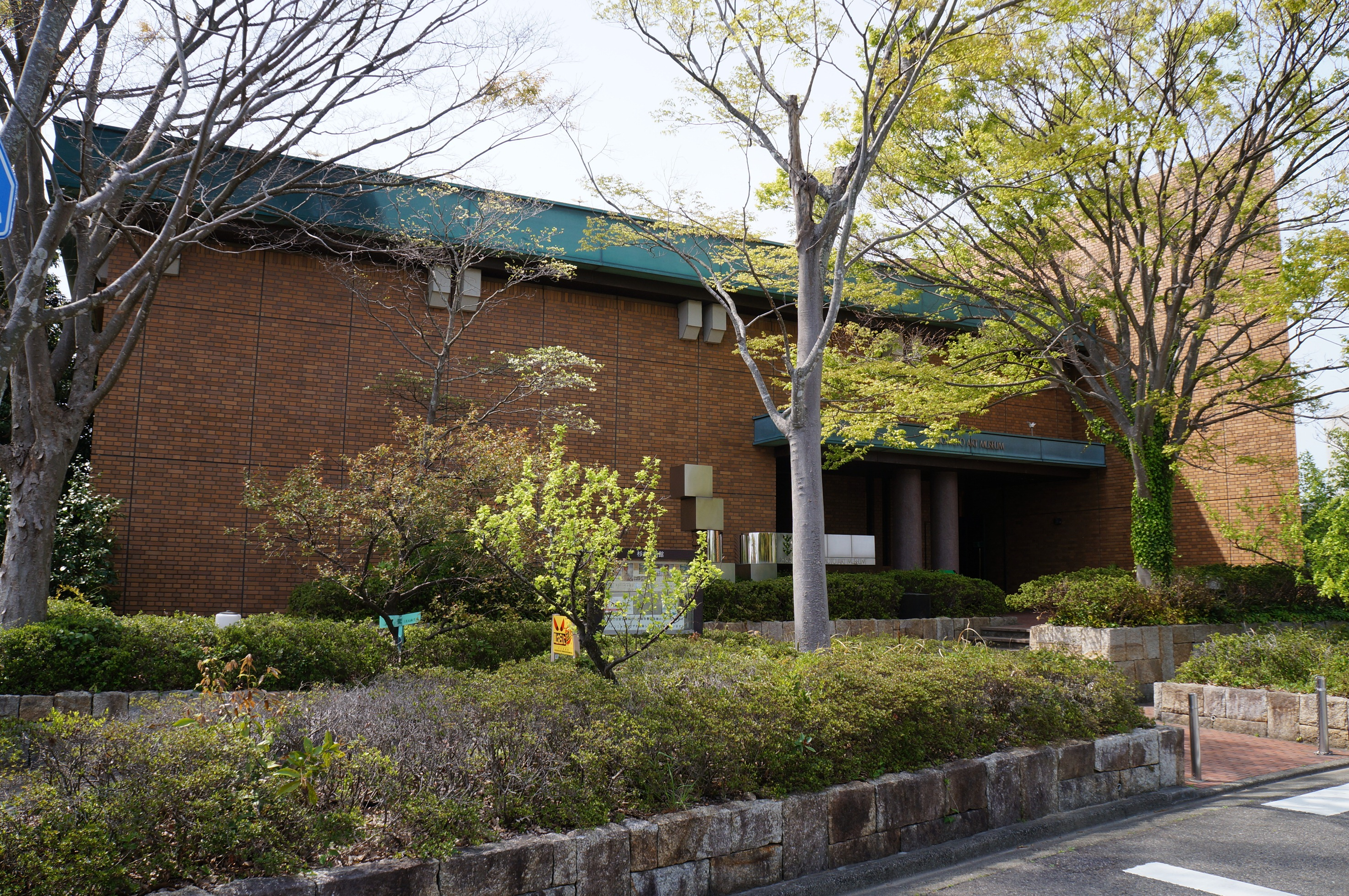
- Established: April 1978
- Location: Mihama, Chita, Aichi, Japan
- Type: Museum

The Sugimoto Art Museum (杉本美術館) features the work of the Japanese painter Kenkichi Sugimoto (1905-2004) and is located in Mihama, Chita District, Aichi Prefecture, Japan. The museum is operated by the Meitetsu railway company.

The Sugimoto Museum of Art closed on October 31, 2021.

== See also ==
- List of single-artist museums
