= Mihama, Aichi =

Mihama 美浜町
- Town
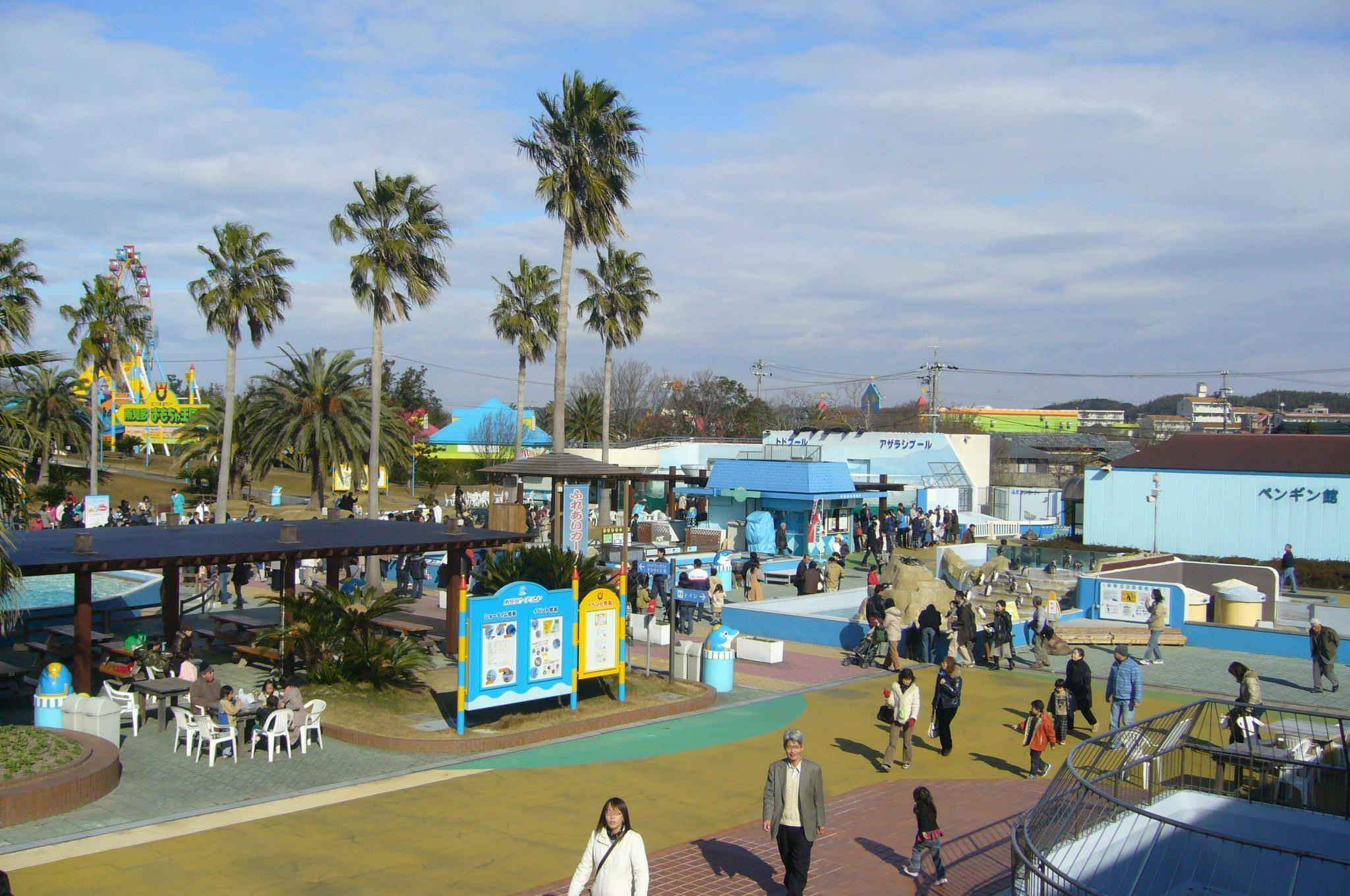
- Minami-Chita Beachland

- Flag Seal

- Location of Mihama in Aichi Prefecture

- Coordinates: 34°46′43.9″N 136°54′29.6″E
- Country: Japan
- Region: Chūbu region Tōkai region
- Prefecture: Aichi
- District: Chita

Area
  - Total: 46.20 km^{2} (17.84 sq mi)

Population (October 1, 2019)
  - Total: 22,701
  - Density: 491.4/km^{2} (1,273/sq mi)
- Time zone: UTC+9 (Japan Standard Time)
- Tree: Pinus thunbergii
- Flower: Azalea
- Phone number: 0569-82-1111
- Address: Kowa, Mihama-chō, Chita-gun, Aichi-ken 470-2406
- Website: Official website

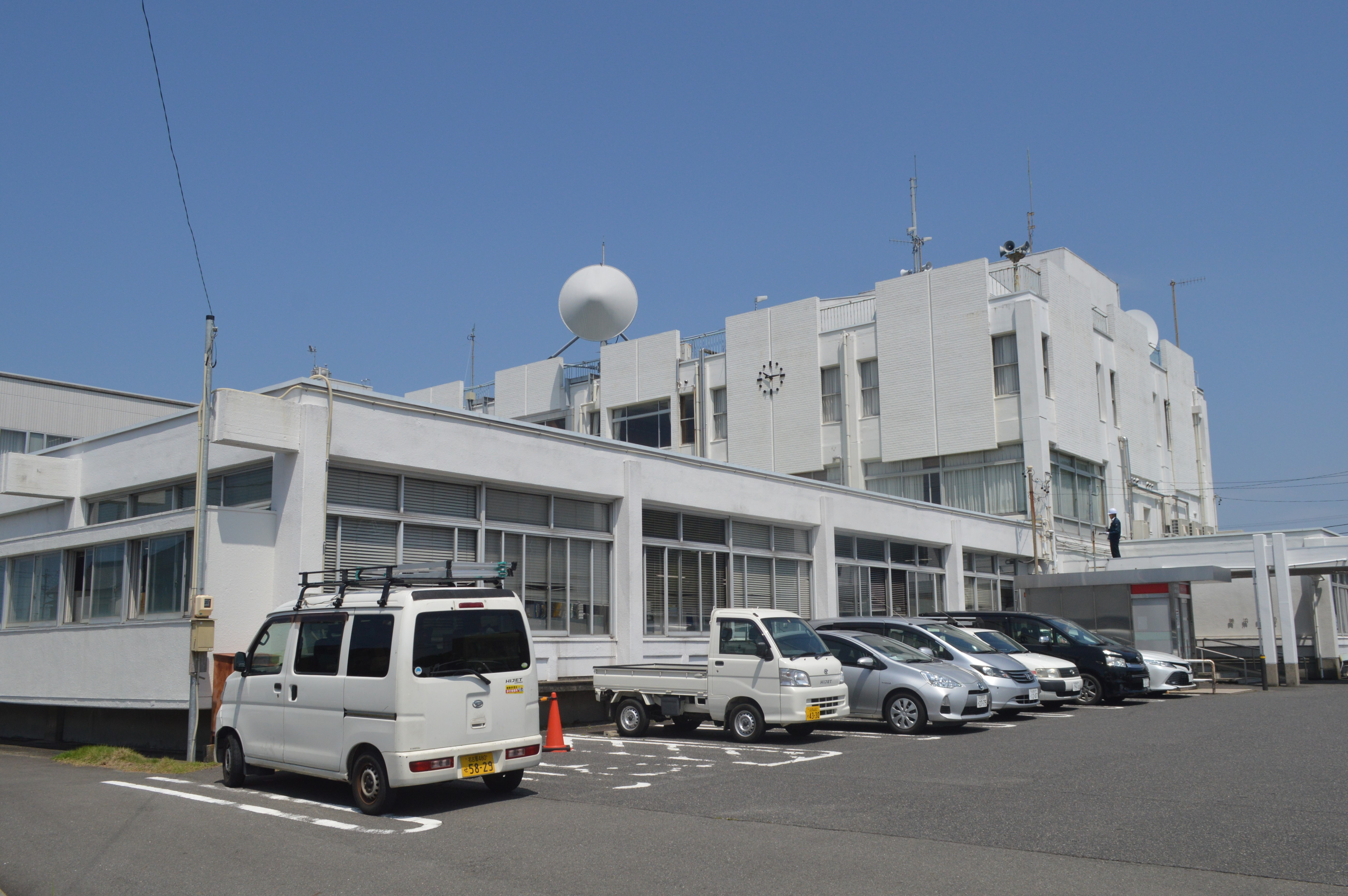
Mihama town hall

Mihama (美浜町, Mihama-chō) is a town located in Chita District, Aichi Prefecture, Japan. As of 1 October 2019, the town had an estimated population of 22,701 in 8852 households, and a population density of 491 persons per km^{2}. The total area of the town was 46.20 square kilometres (17.84 sq mi)

== Geography ==
Mihama is located in the center of Chita Peninsula in southern Aichi Prefecture, bordered by Mikawa Bay to the east and Ise Bay to the west. Part of the town's area is within the borders of the Mikawa Wan Quasi-National Park.

=== Neighboring municipalities ===
- Aichi Prefecture
  - Minamichita
  - Taketoyo
  - Tokoname

== Demographics ==
Per Japanese census data, the population of Mihama peaked at around the year 2005 and has been in slow decline since.

Historical population
| Year | Pop. | ±% |
|---|---|---|
| 1960 | 19,327 | — |
| 1970 | 19,227 | −0.5% |
| 1980 | 20,820 | +8.3% |
| 1990 | 24,669 | +18.5% |
| 2000 | 26,083 | +5.7% |
| 2010 | 25,180 | −3.5% |

=== Climate ===
The town has a climate characterized by hot and humid summers, and relatively mild winters (Köppen climate classification Cfa). The average annual temperature in Mihama is 15.6 °C. The average annual rainfall is 1737 mm with September as the wettest month. The temperatures are highest on average in August, at around 27.4 °C, and lowest in January, at around 4.8 °C.

== History ==
The villages of Kōwa and Noma were established within Chita District, Aichi with the establishment of the modern municipalities system on October 1, 1889. Kōwa was raised to town status on May 6, 1903. Noma was raised to town status on July 1, 1942. The town of Mihama was established on April 1, 1955, through the merger of the towns of Kōwa and Noma. On March 31, 1957, the area of the town expanded when the neighboring town of Kosugaya was dissolved, and divided between Mihama and Tokoname. During March 2006, discussions were held to merge Mihama with the town of Minamichita to the south to form the new city of “Minamicentrair” named after the popular nickname for Chūbu Centrair International Airport, but the merger proposal was strongly opposed by the majority of the inhabitants of Minamichita, and the merger did not take place.

== Economy ==
The primary sector dominates the economy of Mihama, notably commercial fishing and agriculture.

== Education ==
- Nihon Fukushi University – Mihama Campus
- Mihama has five public elementary schools and two public junior high schools operated by the town government, and one high school operated by the Aichi Prefectural Board of Education.

=== High school ===
- Nihon Fukushi University Affiliated High School

=== Junior high schools ===
- Kōwa Junior High School
- Noma Junior High School

=== Elementary schools ===
- Okuda Elementary School
- Kōwa Elementary School
- Kaminoma Elementary School
- Futo Elementary School
- Noma Elementary School
  - Minami-Kōwa Elementary school (School closed and merged with Kōwa Elementary School on March 31, 2022)

== Transportation ==
=== Railway ===
Meitetsu – Kōwa Line

- Kōwaguchi - Kōwa

Meitetsu – Chita New Line

- Kaminoma - Mihama Ryokuen - Chita-Okuda - Noma

=== Buses ===
==== Chita Noriai ====
- Kōwa - Morozaki port
- Uenoma - Tokoname - Rinkū Tokoname - Tokoname Hospital

==== Highway ====
- Minamichita Road
- National Route 247

== Local attractions ==
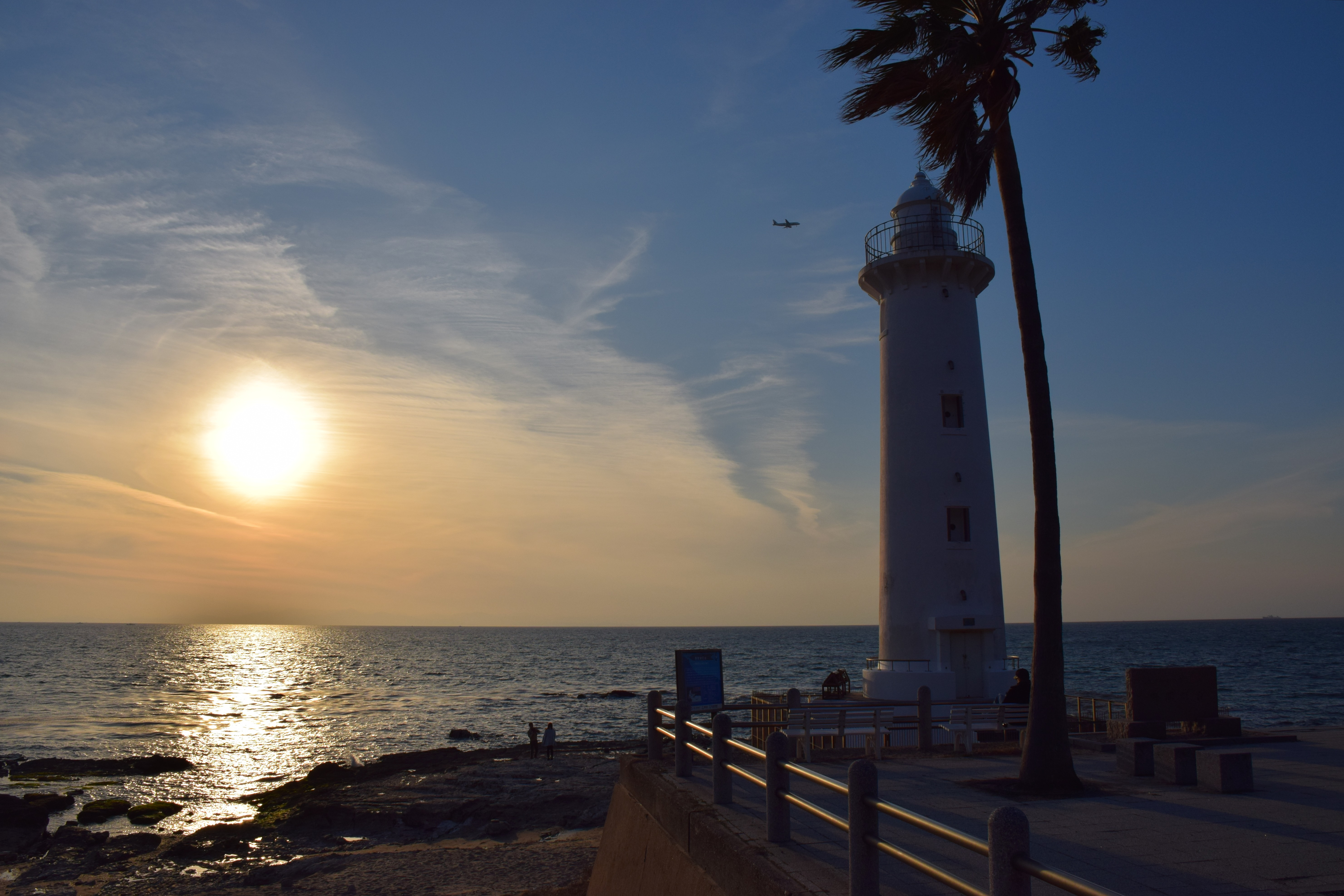
Nomazaki Lighthouse

- Minami-Chita Beachland - beach resort
- Nomazaki Lighthouse
- Sugimoto Art Museum
- Tylek & Tylecek Mihama Museum

== Notable people ==
- Otokichi, Edo period Japanese castaway
- Souichi, Japanese comedian
