= Rinkū Tokoname Station =

Railway station in Tokoname, Aichi Prefecture, Japan

Rinkū-Tokoname Station りんくう常滑駅

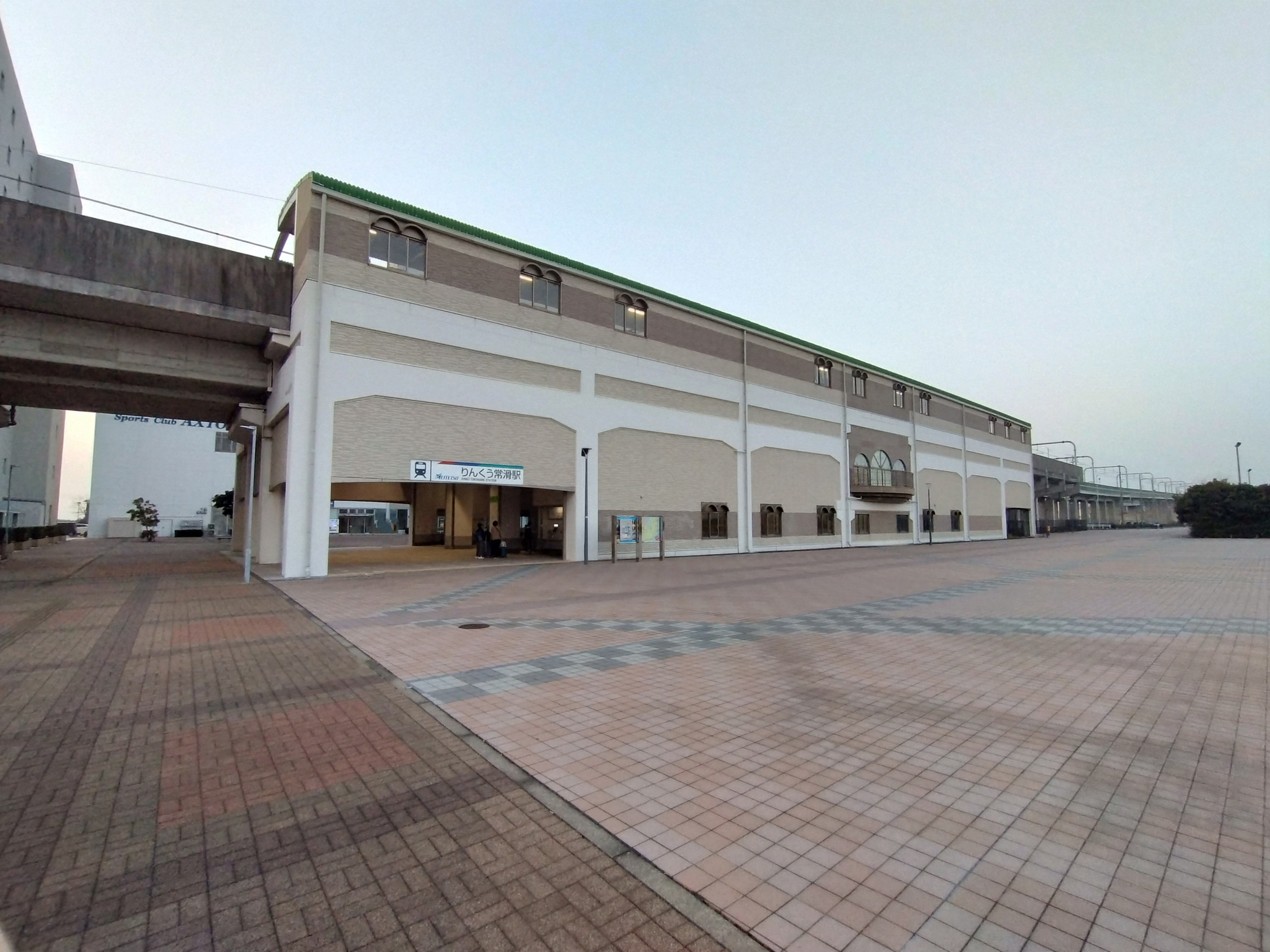
- Rinkū-Tokoname Station in March 2025

General information
- Location: 2-3 Rinkucho, Tokoname-shi, Aichi-ken; Japan
- Coordinates: 34.8795°N 136.8282°E
- Owner: Central Japan International Airport Line Co., Ltd.
- Operator: Meitetsu
- Line: ■ Meitetsu Airport Line
- Distance: 1.6 kilometers from Tokoname
- Platforms: 2 side platforms

Other information
- Status: Unstaffed
- Station code: TA23
- Website: Official website

History
- Opened: January 29, 2005

Passengers
- FY2016: 2275 daily

Services
Preceding station	Meitetsu	Following station
Central Japan International Airport Terminus	Airport Line Express Semi-Express Local	Tokoname Terminus
Location
- Location within Aichi Prefecture Location within Japan

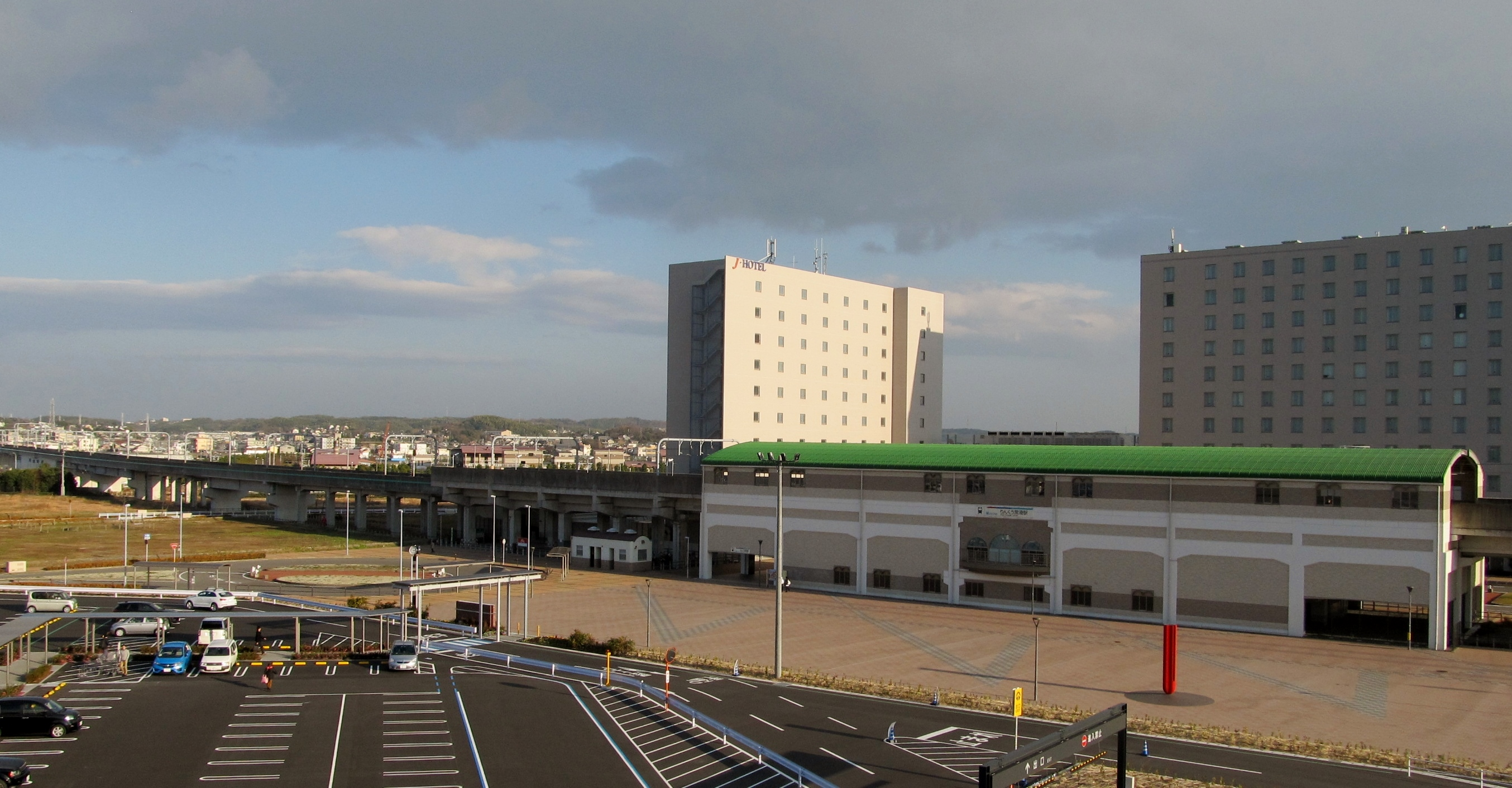
North exit

Rinkū Tokoname Station (りんくう常滑駅, Rinkū Tokoname-eki) is a railway station in the city of Tokoname, Aichi, Japan, operated by Meitetsu.

== Lines ==
Rinkū Tokoname Station is served by the Meitetsu Airport Line, and is located 1.8 kilometers from the starting point of the line at Tokoname and 31.1 kilometers from Jingū-mae.

== Station layout ==
The station has two opposed elevated side platforms with the station building underneath. The station has automated ticket machines, Manaca automated turnstiles and it is unattended.

=== Platforms ===
1	■ Meitetsu Airport Line	For Central Japan International Airport
2	■ Meitetsu Airport Line	For Ōtagawa, Meitetsu Nagoya, Inuyama, and Shin Kani

== Station history ==
The Meitetsu Airport Line began operations between Tokoname Station and Central Japan International Airport Station on October 16, 2004. Rinkū Tokoname Station, an intermediate stop, was opened on January 29, 2005.

== Passenger statistics ==
In fiscal 2016, the station was used by an average of 1,291 passengers daily (boarding passengers only).

== Surrounding area ==
- Aeon Mall Tokoname

== See also ==
- List of railway stations in Japan
