= Nihon Fukushi University =

Private university in Aichi Prefecture, Japan

- 日本福祉大学
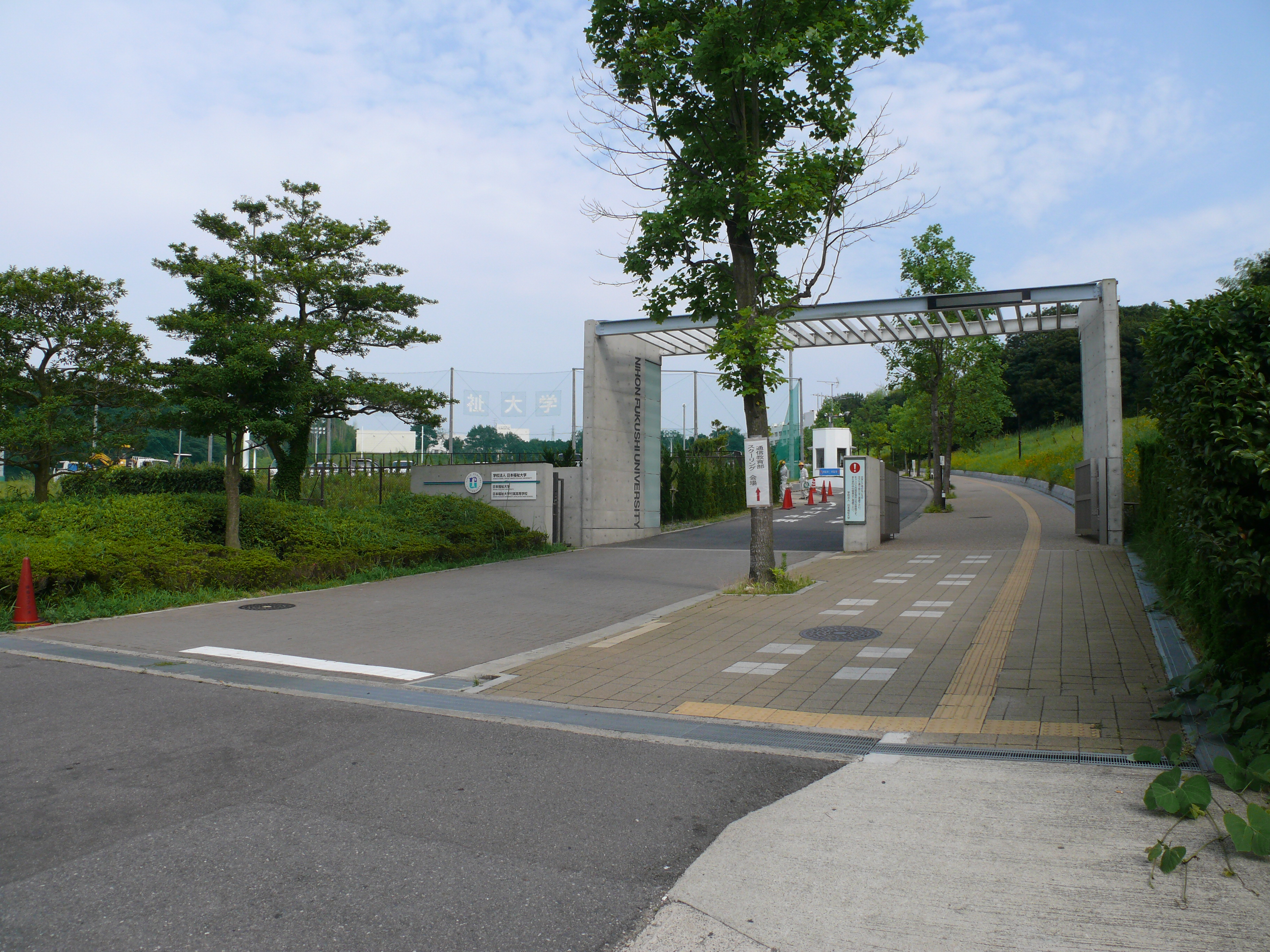
- Main Gate
- Type: Private
- Established: 1953
- President: Sachio Katō
- Location: Mihama, Aichi; Handa, Aichi; Tokai, Aichi; Naka-ku, Nagoya, Japan; 34.784°N 136.869°E; 34.928°N 136.956°E; 35.1576°N 136.918°E
- Campus: Multiple campuses
- Nickname: NFU
- Website: www.n-fukushi.ac.jp/ENGLISH/TOP.HTML

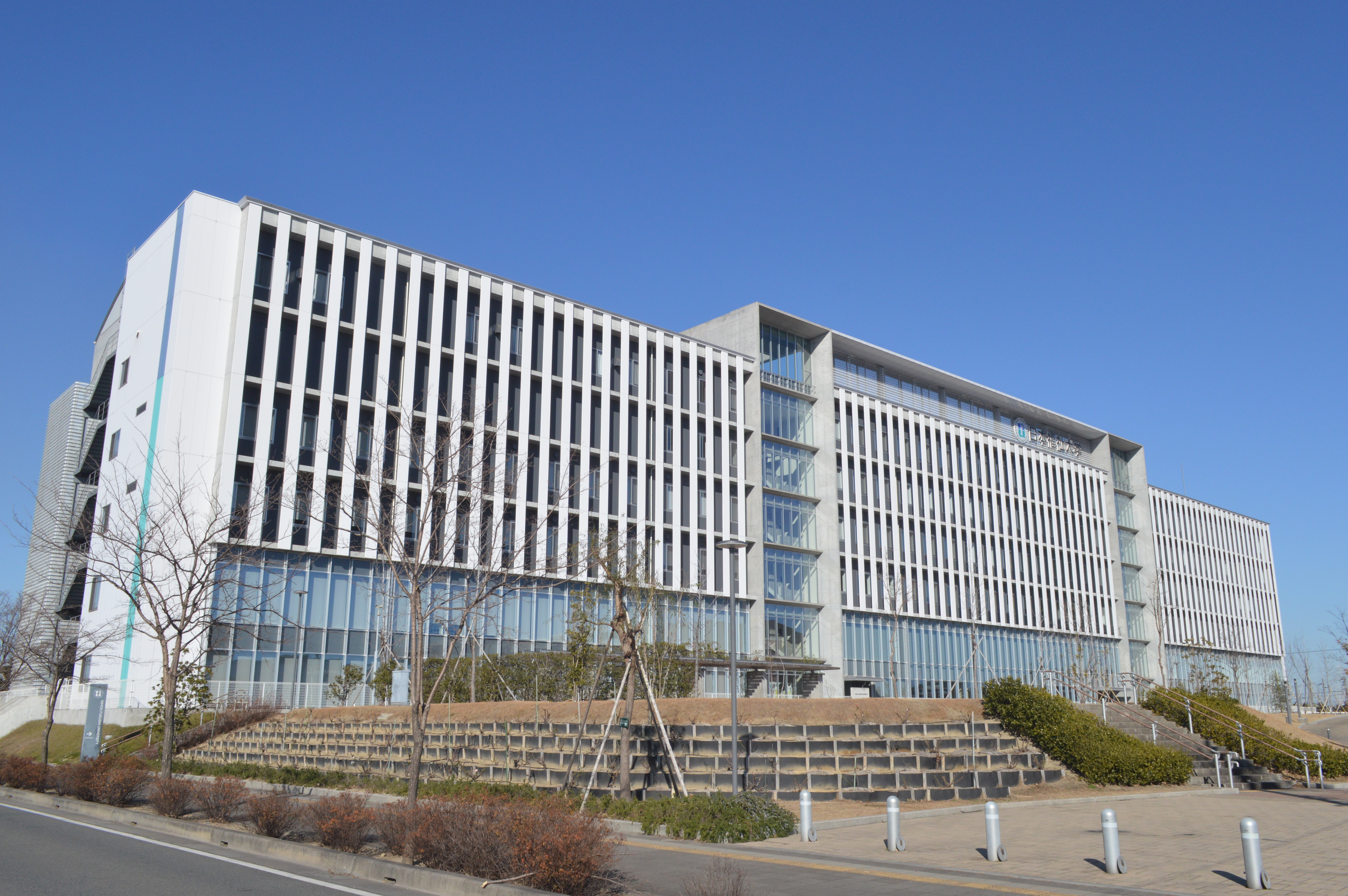
Tokai Campus

Nihon Fukushi University (日本福祉大学, Nihon fukushi daigaku) is a private university with its main campus at Mihama, Aichi, and other campuses at Nagoya and Handa, also in Aichi Prefecture, Japan. The school was founded as a junior college in 1953 and became a four-year college in 1957.
