= Meitetsu Chita New Line =

Railway line in Aichi Prefecture, Japan

Chita New Line

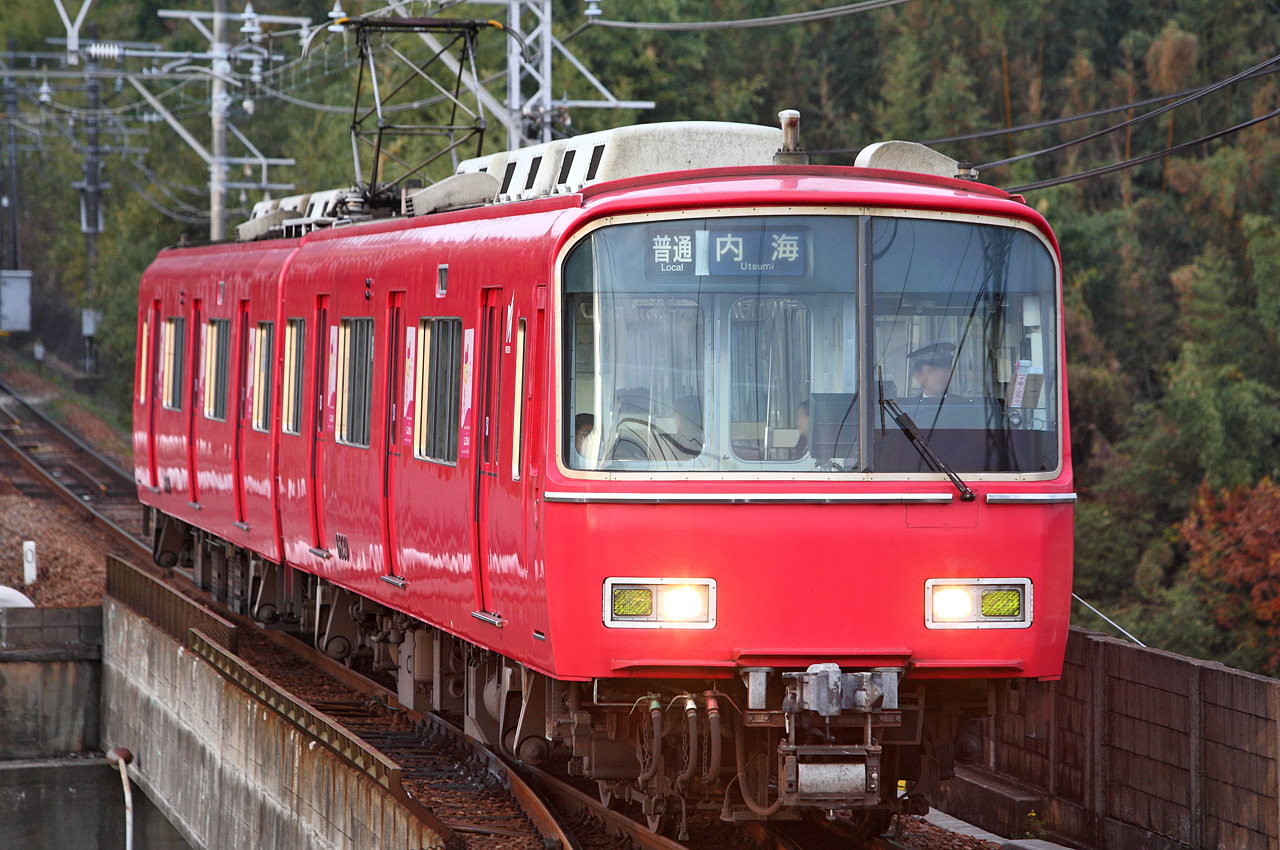
- A Meitetsu 6800 series at Chita Okuda Station

Overview
- Other name: Chita Line
- Native name: 知多新線
- Owner: Nagoya Railroad Co., Ltd.
- Line number: KC
- Locale: Taketoyo; Mihama; Minamichita
- Termini: Fuki; Utsumi
- Stations: 6

Service
- Type: Commuter rail
- System: Meitetsu
- Operator(s): Nagoya Railroad Co., Ltd.
- Rolling stock: Reference: List: Meitetsu 2000 series; Meitetsu 2200 series; Meitetsu 1700 series; Meitetsu 1200 series; Meitetsu 1800 series; Meitetsu 3500 series; Meitetsu 3700 series; Meitetsu 3100 series; Meitetsu 3300 series; Meitetsu 3150 series; Meitetsu 3300 series; Meitetsu 4000 series; Meitetsu 5700 series; Meitetsu 6000 series; Meitetsu 6500 series; Meitetsu 6800 series; Meitetsu 5000 series; Meitetsu 9500 series

History
- Opened: June 30, 1974; 52 years ago
- Completed: 5 June 1980

Technical
- Line length: 13.9 km (8.64 mi)
- Track gauge: 1,067 mm (3 ft 6 in)
- Electrification: 1,500 V DC, overhead catenary

The Chita New Line (知多新線, Chita-shin-sen) is a Japanese railway line in Aichi Prefecture connecting Taketoyo with Minamichita. It is owned and operated by the private railway operator Nagoya Railroad (Meitetsu).

The line was constructed as part of Meitetsu's effort to develop the southern Chita Peninsula. The company encountered difficulties constructing the line such as the discovery of a shell midden. The line was completed on 5 June 1980, although residential development along the line was restricted by the time the line was complete due to the Japanese land law. The entire line is single-tracked.

== History ==
Before World War II, several groups attempted to build a railway line into southern Chita peninsula. For instance, Japan Governmental Railways attempted to extend the Taketoyo Line to Morozaki, Aichi Electric Railways (which later became Meitetsu) attempted to build a line to Utsumi, and local investors planned to build a light railway from Taketoyo in 1913. However, due to the low population density in the area, and the lack of industry, none of the plans came to fruition.

As part of an effort to develop the southern Chita peninsula, Meitetsu planned to build a line to Utsumi. They considered three potential routes: extending the Meitetsu Tokoname Line down south, extending the Meitetsu Kōwa Line southwest from Kōwa Station, and branching off the Kōwa Line from the Fuki Station. Meitetsu rejected the Tokoname route due to the length of the line needed to extend to Utsumi, and they preferred the Fuki route as it was easier to develop the central part of the peninsula. For the route running west of the peninsula, Meitetsu took the hillside route to allow housing developments. In 1969, they gained permits to construct the first section of the line from Fuki Station to Bessouike signaling station. They obtained permits to build the rest of the line from Bessouike to Utsumi in 1971, and they started extending the line. The first section of the line to Kaminoma Station was opened in 1974. The construction of the Utsumi Station was delayed due to a midden, which was discovered in 1978. The line was completed with the final extension to Utsumi on 5 June 1980. The Mihama-ryokuen Station opened on 24 April 1987 as an infill station for developments. During the line's construction, most of the area along the line was restricted from residential development by the Japanese land law, which prevented most developments. This resulted in the line's ridership being lower than the estimated numbers. One-person operation on the line commenced from the timetable revision on 18 March 2023.

== Network and operations ==
The line branches off the Meitetsu Kōwa Line from Fuki on the eastern side of the Chita Peninsula. It crosses the peninsula and then runs on the western side facing the Ise Bay toward the south. The line reaches its terminus at Utsumi, the southernmost station of Meitetsu. As of 2025, trains service the line every 30 minutes from 5 a.m. to 10 p.m., although service is more frequent during rush hours. Local services run inside the line during daytime, while rapid/limited express services are run to stations in other lines such as Meitetsu Nagoya Station on rush hours.

== Infrastructure ==
The entire line is single-tracked and is elevated via viaducts to avoid level crossing and to speed up services. A station by the name Onoura Station was constructed to be opened between Noma and Utsumi, but this station never opened. The line accepts Manaca, a contactless smart card.

=== Stations ===
No.	Image	Station	Japanese	Between (km)	Distance (km)	Transfers	Location
KC17		Fuki	富貴	-	0.0	Kōwa Line (KC17)	Taketoyo, Chita District
KC20		Kami Noma	上野間	2.8	5.8		Mihama, Chita District
KC21		Mihama-ryokuen	美浜緑苑	0.9	6.7		Mihama, Chita District
KC22		Chita Okuda	知多奥田	1.4	8.1		Mihama, Chita District
KC23		Noma	野間	1.7	9.8		Mihama, Chita District
KC24		Utsumi	内海	4.1	13.9		Minamichita, Chita
