= Meitetsu 5000 series (2008) =

Japanese electric multiple unit train type

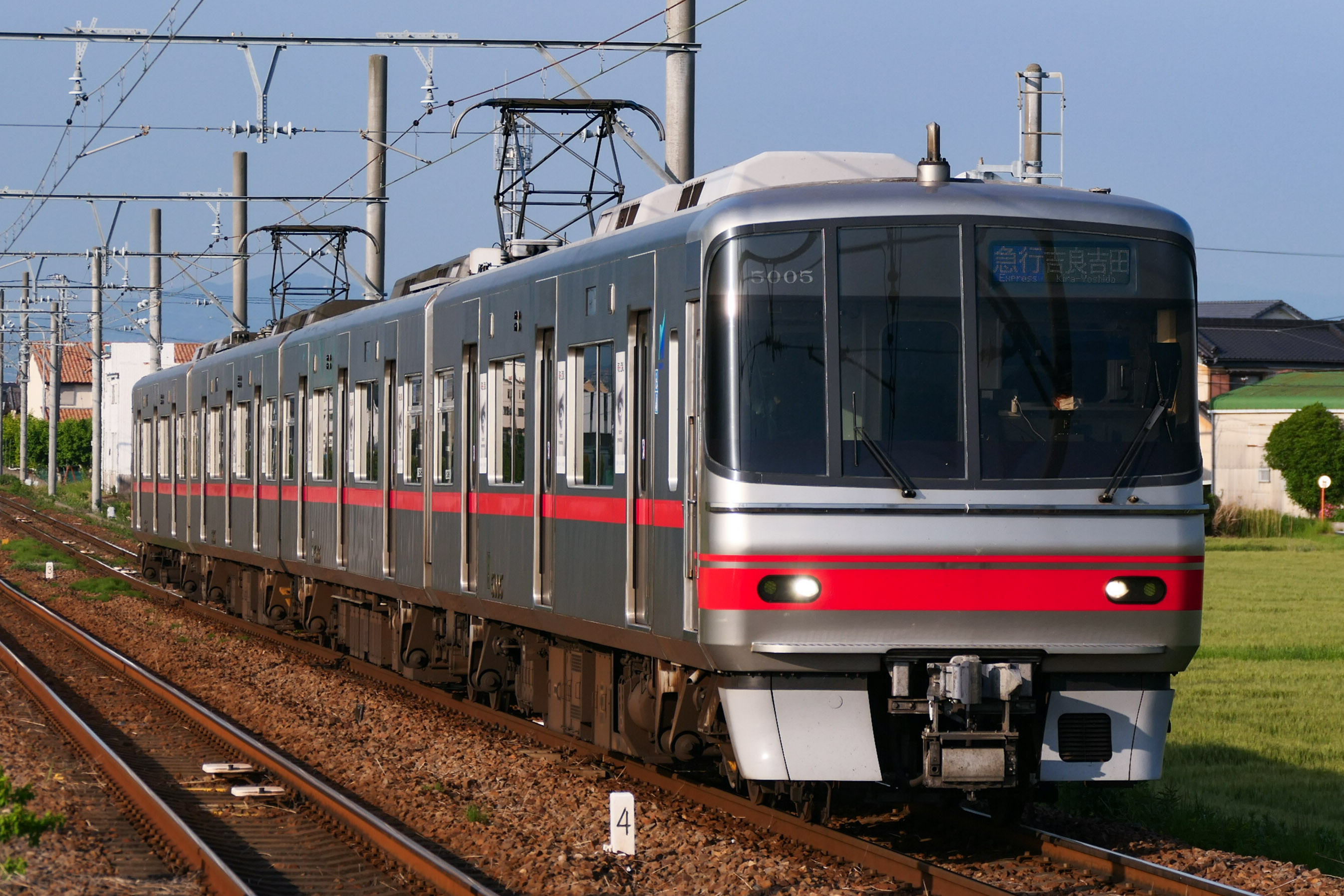
- 5000 series set in May 2025
- In service: 2008-
- Manufacturer: Nippon Sharyo
- Number built: 56 vehicles (14 sets)
- Number in service: 56 vehicles (14 sets)
- Formation: 4 cars per trainset
- Capacity: 522 (192 seated)
- Operator: Meitetsu
- Lines served: Nagoya Main Line; Bisai Line; Tsushima Line; Tokoname Line; Airport Line; Chikkō Line; Kōwa Line; Chita New Line; Inuyama Line; Kakamigahara Line; Hiromi Line

Specifications
- Car body construction: Stainless steel
- Car length: 18,900 mm (62 ft 0 in) (end cars), 18,830 mm (61 ft 9 in) (intermediate cars)
- Width: 2,744 mm (9 ft 0 in)
- Height: 3,979 mm (13 ft 0.7 in) (end cars without rooftop equipment), 4,110 mm (13 ft 6 in) (intermediate cars) (with pantograph folded)
- Doors: 3 pairs per side
- Maximum speed: 120 km/h (75 mph)
- Traction system: Field Chopper control
- Acceleration: 2.0 km/(h⋅s) (1.2 mph/s)
- Deceleration: 3.5 km/(h⋅s) (2.2 mph/s) (service); 4.0 km/(h⋅s) (2.5 mph/s) (emergency)
- Electric system: 1,500 V DC
- Current collection: Overhead wire
- Safety system: Meitetsu ATS
- Multiple working: 5300/5700 series
- Track gauge: 1,067 mm (3 ft 6 in)

The Meitetsu 5000 series (名鉄5000系) is a commuter electric multiple unit (EMU) type operated by Meitetsu in Japan since 2008.

== Design ==
The 5000 series trains were built with stainless steel bodies and using electrical equipment reclaimed from then-recently withdrawn 1000 series sets.

== Operations ==
The 5000 series trains are used on the following lines as of the 3 October 2009 timetable revision.

- Meitetsu Nagoya Main Line (West of Ina Station), Bisai Line
- Meitetsu Tokoname Line, Meitetsu Airport Line, Meitetsu Chikkō Line, Meitetsu Kōwa Line, Meitetsu Chita New Line
- Inuyama Line, Kakamigahara Line, Hiromi Line (from Inuyama Station to Shin Kani Station)
- Tsushima Line, Bisai Line (From Tsushima Station to Yatomi Station)

== Formation ==
Designation	Tc1	M2	M1	Tc2
Numbering	Ku 5000	Mo 5050	Mo 5150	Ku 5100

The M1 and M2 cars each have one lozenge-type pantograph.

== Build details ==
Build year	Set No.	Donor set No.
FY2007 (Batch 1)	5001	1008
FY2007 (Batch 1)	5002	1005
FY2007 (Batch 1)	5003	1003
FY2007 (Batch 1)	5004	1009
FY2008 (Batch 2)	5005	1006
FY2008 (Batch 2)	5010	1017
FY2008 (Batch 2)	5011	1018
FY2008 (Batch 2)	5013	1020
FY2009 (Batch 3)	5006	1002
FY2009 (Batch 3)	5007	1004
FY2009 (Batch 3)	5008	1007
FY2009 (Batch 3)	5009	1010
FY2009 (Batch 3)	5012	1019
FY2009 (Batch 3)	5014	1021

== Interior ==
The interior has a light gray color scheme. As with the earlier 3150 series, individual seats are 470 mm wide. They are upholstered with a blue moquette. The seats use a cantilever structure, i.e. attached to the walls, and in each car there is one folding seat. The straps are 1,630 mm from the floor.

The number of priority seats, for the aged or infirm, was increased to 10 seats in each car. The priority seats use red moquette and orange straps and poles to hold on to clarify the distinction between those seats and regular seats. Wheelchair spaces are located behind the driver's cab in both cars on each end of the train.

On the first two batches, the floor had a subtle blue-gray, two-color combination, but starting with the third batch of cars produced in 2009, cars have pale gray, single-color doors with yellow lines surrounding the door for improved visibility.

Each car has internal LED passenger information panels, displaying the next stop, above each of the three pairs of passenger doors on each side.

== Electrical and mechanical systems ==
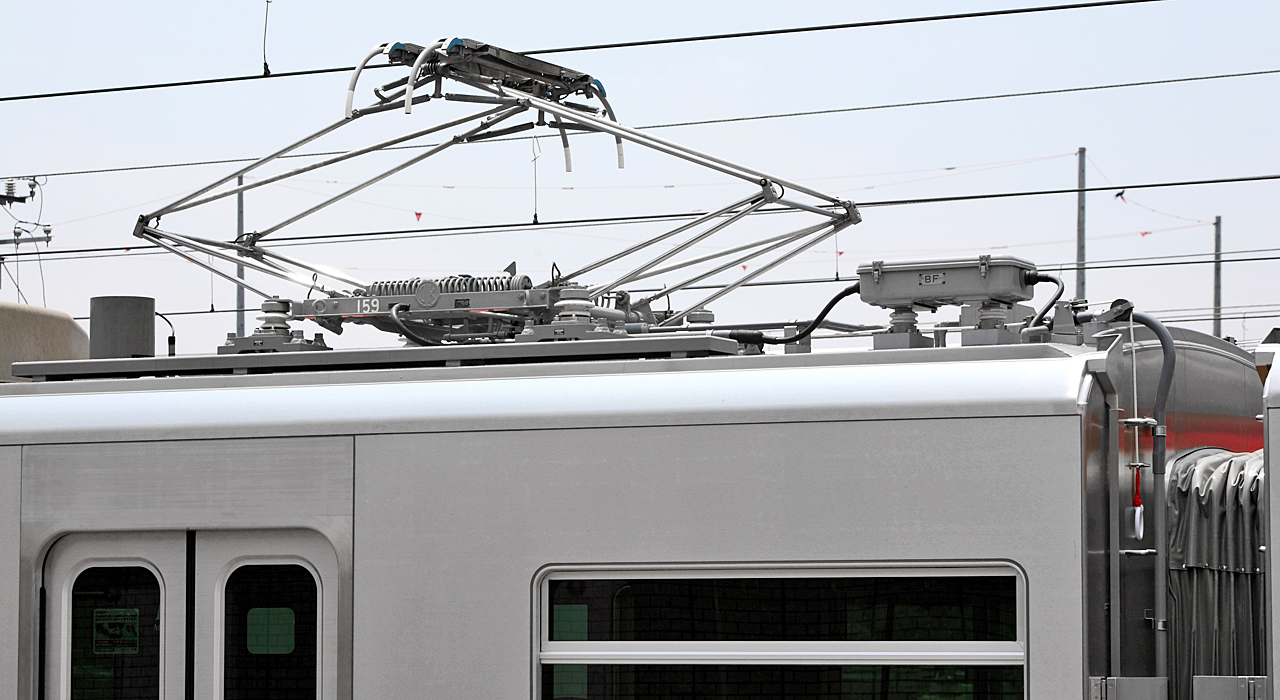
Lozenge-style pantograph reclaimed from former 1000 series sets

The main electrical system is Toshiba's gate turn-off thyristor field chopper control used in the 1000 series. For maintenance of the DC compound motors, it is necessary to inspect and maintain the brushes, so each motored car has access hatches in the floor of the car.

The brake system uses the electro-pneumatic straight air brake with regenerative braking from the 1000 series. The series was remodeled with a load compensating device which adjusts brake power to support changes in the car's body weight which increased the passenger limit. The main controller unit, of a series parallel specification, was also taken from the 1000 series, and taking into account connecting this series with 1380, 1800, and 1850 series cars, test runs on 1800 series cars were carried out. From these tests, it was found that such trains could be run at up to 120 km/h. Because of this, cars in this series can be used as sudden replacements for cars in limited express trains. It has also been confirmed that this series can be connected to the 5300 series and 5700 series (in this case trains are not run at 120 km/h.) With this series having been connected to the 1380 series for test runs and out-of-service runs, it is theoretically possible to operate a train with this series connected to the 1380 series. However, the 5000 series has cars with only bench seats, as opposed to the 1380 series which, except for the ends of the cars, only has convertible forward- or backward-facing seats, so for the sake of this the two series are operated separately.

The Ku 5000 and Mo 5150 cars are equipped with an auxiliary power unit supplied by 330 V DC from a DC to DC converter.

The first sets built in 2007 (5001 to 5004) all had FS539 and FS039 bogies which had bolsters, but the sets built from 2008 had SS165F and SS026F bolsterless bogies. In the bogies with bolsters, the brake's leverage has been updated to increase the braking power to cope with increased ridership. The bogies attached to the control cars have their brake piping divided into two parts, and have been modified with anti-slip equipment. The bolsterless bogies, however, have unit brakes, which can guarantee the prescribed level of braking, so the aforementioned changes have not been made.

The air conditioning system is the inverter unified distributed units type taken from the 1000 series, with two such units mounted in each car. After inversion, each of the RPU-4414B model units can cool up to 17,000 kilocalories per hour. In line with increased air conditioning power, the heat exchanger installed on every car in the 1000 series is not installed in this series. This series is also equipped with the same diamond-shaped pantograph from the 1000 series.
