= Utsumi Station =

Railway station in Mihamachita, Aichi Prefecture, Japan

Utsumi Station 内海駅

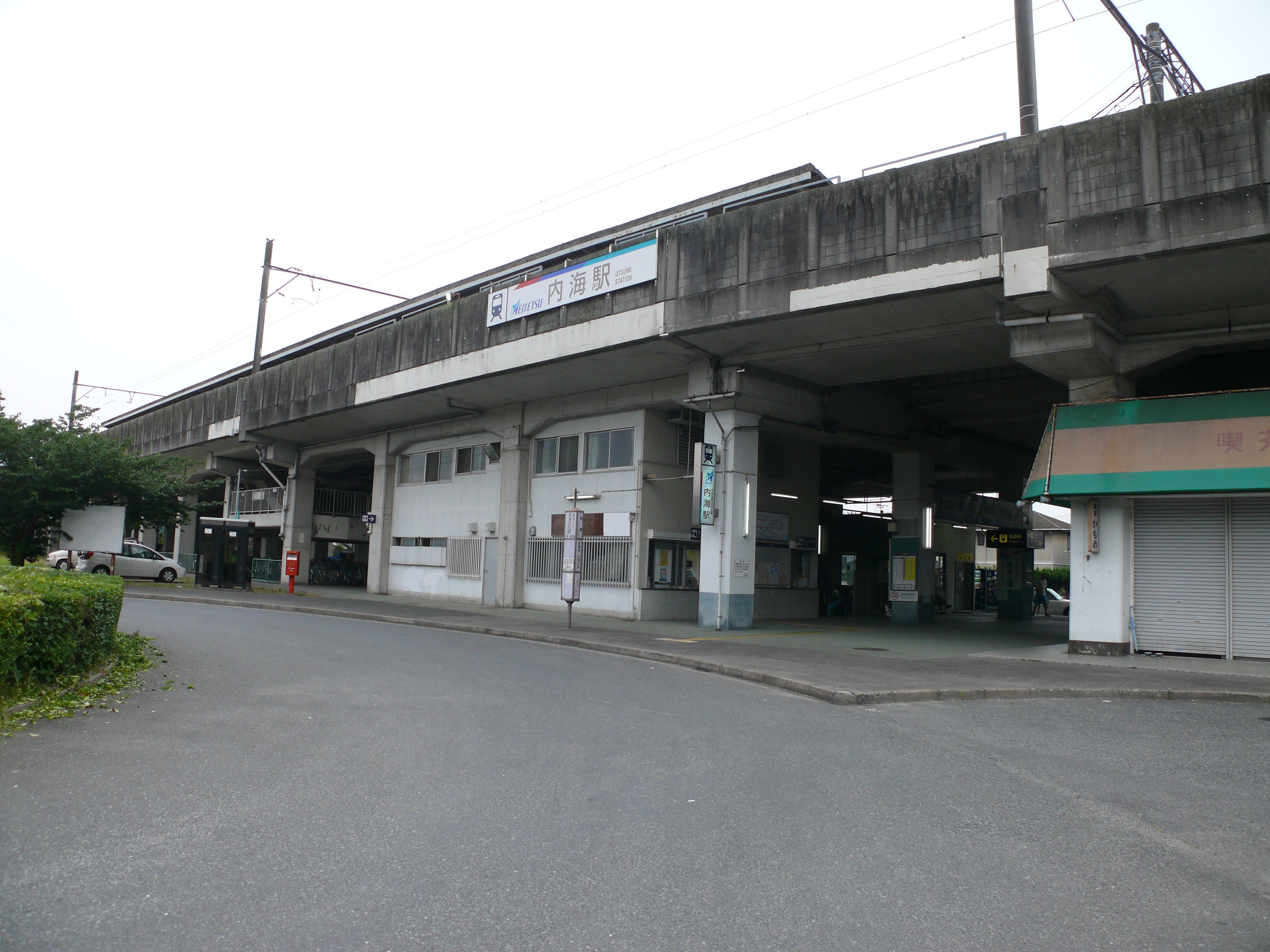
- Utsumi Station in July 2008

General information
- Location: Mazukari-171-4 Utsumi, Minamichita-cho, Chita-gun, Aichi-ken 470-3321; Japan
- Coordinates: 34.7449°N 136.875°E
- Line: ■ Meitetsu Chita New Line
- Distance: 13.9 kilometers from Fuki
- Platforms: 2 island platforms

Other information
- Status: Staffed
- Station code: KC24
- Website: Official website

History
- Opened: June 5, 1980

Passengers
- FY2018: 689
Location
- Location within Aichi Prefecture Location within Japan

Utusmi Station track diagram.

Utsumi Station (内海駅, Utsumi-eki) is a train station in the town of Minamichita, Chita District, Aichi Prefecture, Japan, operated by Meitetsu.

== Lines ==
Utsumi Station is a terminal station on the Chita New Line, and is located 13.9 rail kilometers from the opposing terminus at Fuki Station.

== Station layout ==
The station has two elevated island platforms serving four tracks, with the station building located underneath. The station has automated ticket machines, Manaca automated turnstiles and is staffed.

=== Platforms ===
1, 2	■ Meitetsu Chita New Line	For Chita Handa, Ōtagawa, and Meitetsu Nagoya
3, 4	■ Meitetsu Chita New Line	For Chita Handa, Ōtagawa and Meitetsu Nagoya

== Adjacent stations ==
←	Service	→
Meitetsu Chita New Line
Noma	Limited Express	Terminus
Noma	Rapid Express	Terminus
Noma	Express	Terminus
Noma	Local	Terminus

== Station history ==
Utsumi Station was opened on June 5, 1980. An additional track was added in 1986. In 2007, the Tranpass system of magnetic fare cards with automatic turnstiles was implemented.

== Passenger statistics ==
In fiscal 2018, the station was used by an average of 689 passengers daily.

== Surrounding area ==
- Japan National Route 247
- Minamichita onsen
- Utsumi High School

== See also ==
- List of railway stations in Japan
