= Meitetsu 3500 series =

Japanese train type

Meitetsu 3100/3500/3700 series
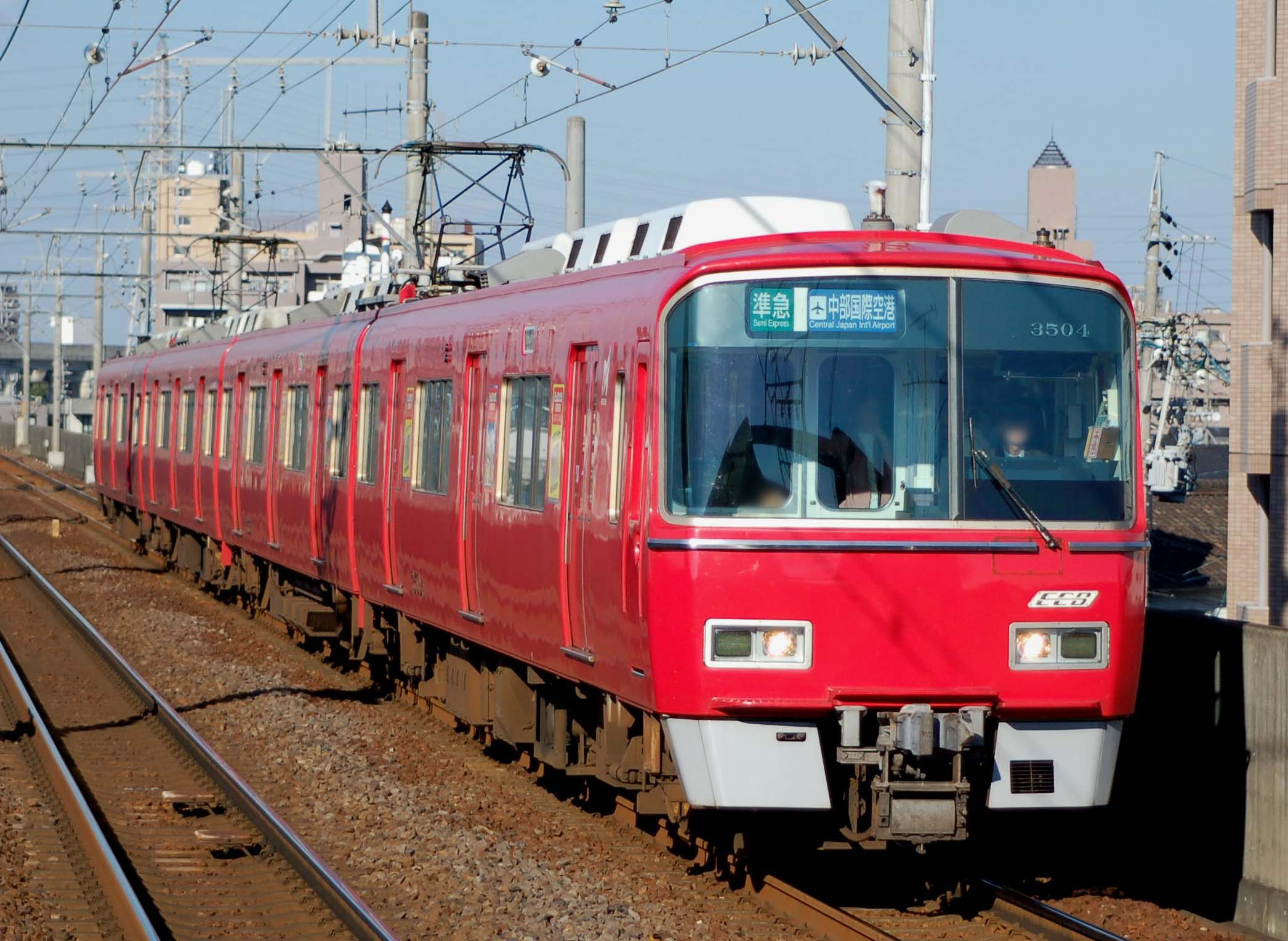
- 3500 series set 3504 on a semi-express service for Central Japan International Airport
- In service: 1993–present
- Manufacturer: Nippon Sharyo
- Replaced: Meitetsu 6000 series
- Constructed: 1993–1996 (3500 series); 1997–1998 (3700 series); 1997–2000 (3100 series)
- Number built: 3500 series: 136 vehicles (34 sets)
- Number in service: 3500 series: 136 vehicles (34 sets)
- Operator: Nagoya Railroad

Specifications
- Car body construction: Steel
- Car length: 18.90 m (62 ft 0 in) (end cars); 18.83 m (61 ft 9 in) (middle cars)
- Traction system: Variable frequency (GTO, IGBT)
- Acceleration: 2.0 km/(h⋅s) (1.2 mph/s)
- Deceleration: Service: 3.5 km/(h⋅s) (2.2 mph/s); Emergency: 4.0 km/(h⋅s) (2.5 mph/s)
- Electric system: 1500 V DC
- Current collection: Pantograph
- Safety system: Meitetsu ATS
- Multiple working: 2200 series; 9500 series
- Track gauge: 1,067 mm (3 ft 6 in)

The Meitetsu 3500 series (名鉄3500系) and the later 3100 and 3700 series (3100・3700系) are commuter electric multiple unit train types operated by Nagoya Railroad (Meitetsu) in Japan since 1993.

== Liveries ==
All 3100, 3500, and 3700 series trainsets bore the Meitetsu all-red livery from new. From 5 June 2019, 3100 series sets were repainted to a red-and-white livery matching that of the 2200 series, starting with set 3107, as the two train types frequently operate in multiple with each other.

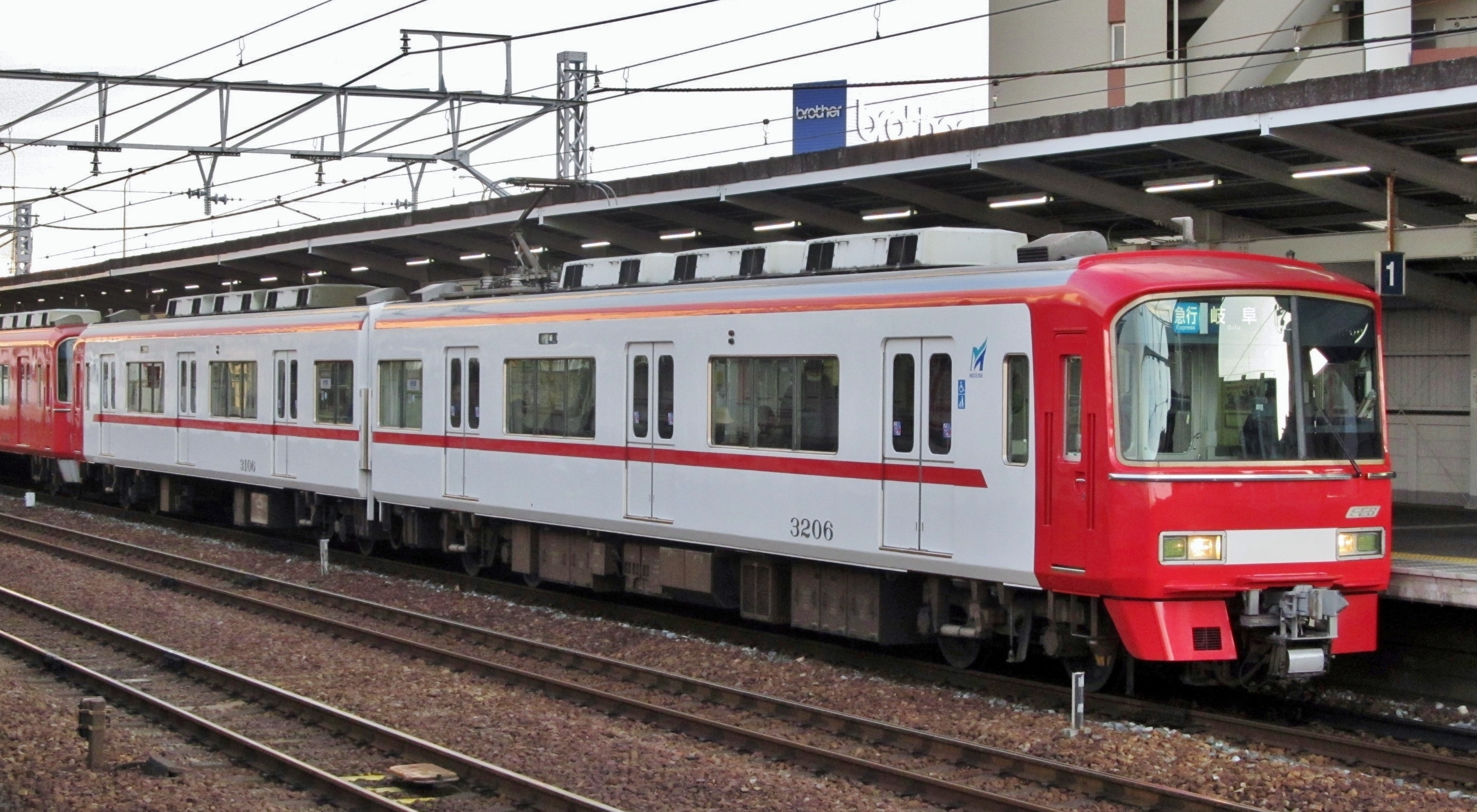
3100 series set 3106 with Meitetsu 2200 series livery on an Express service bound for Gifu

== Refurbishment ==
From fiscal 2017, 3500 series sets have undergone a programme of refurbishment. The work includes the installation of new traction equipment, full-color LED destination indicators, door chimes, and LCD passenger information displays. The first set to be treated, 3501, underwent test operation in August 2017. Set 3511 was fitted with updated equipment some time prior to the refurbishment programme, but the equipment used in the aforementioned set differs slightly from that used in sets refurbished from 2017.

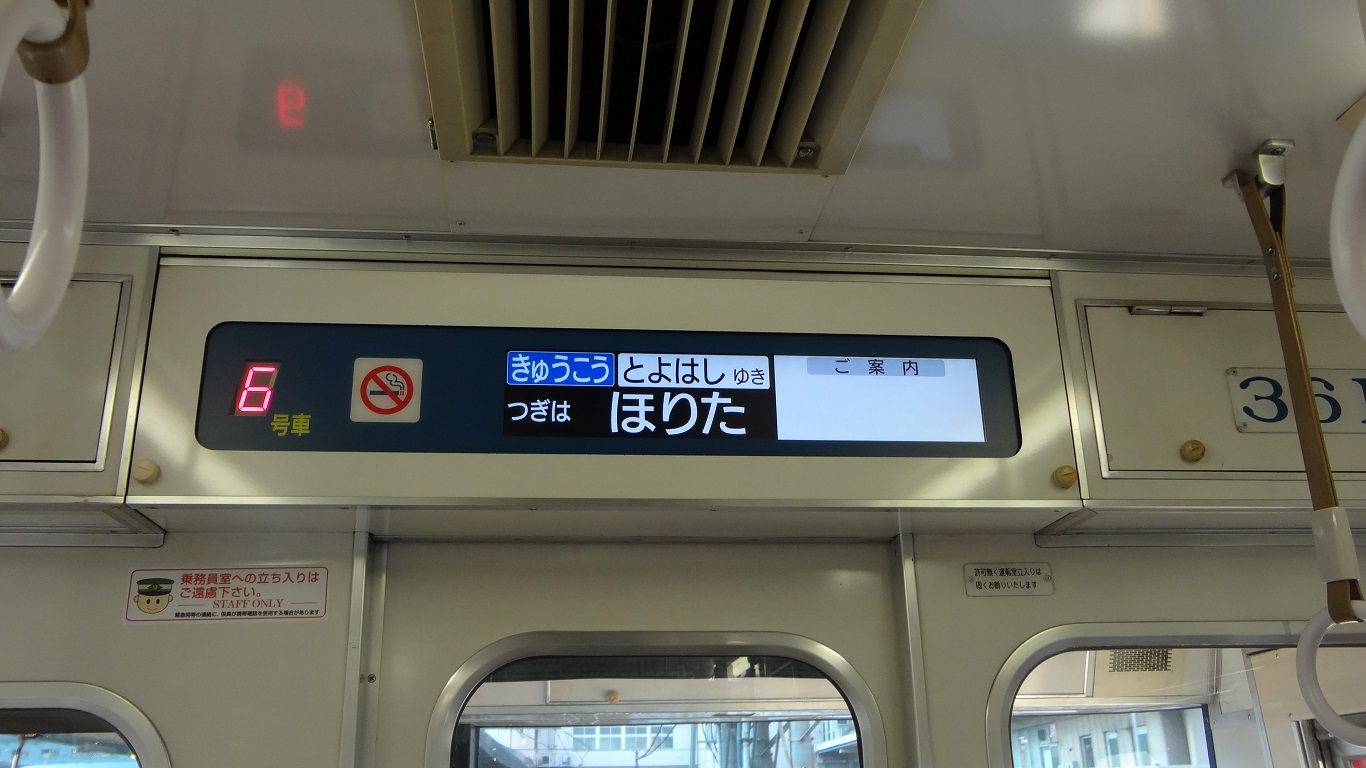
LCD passenger information display of set 3511
