= Meitetsu Airport Line =

Railway line in Japan

Airport Line

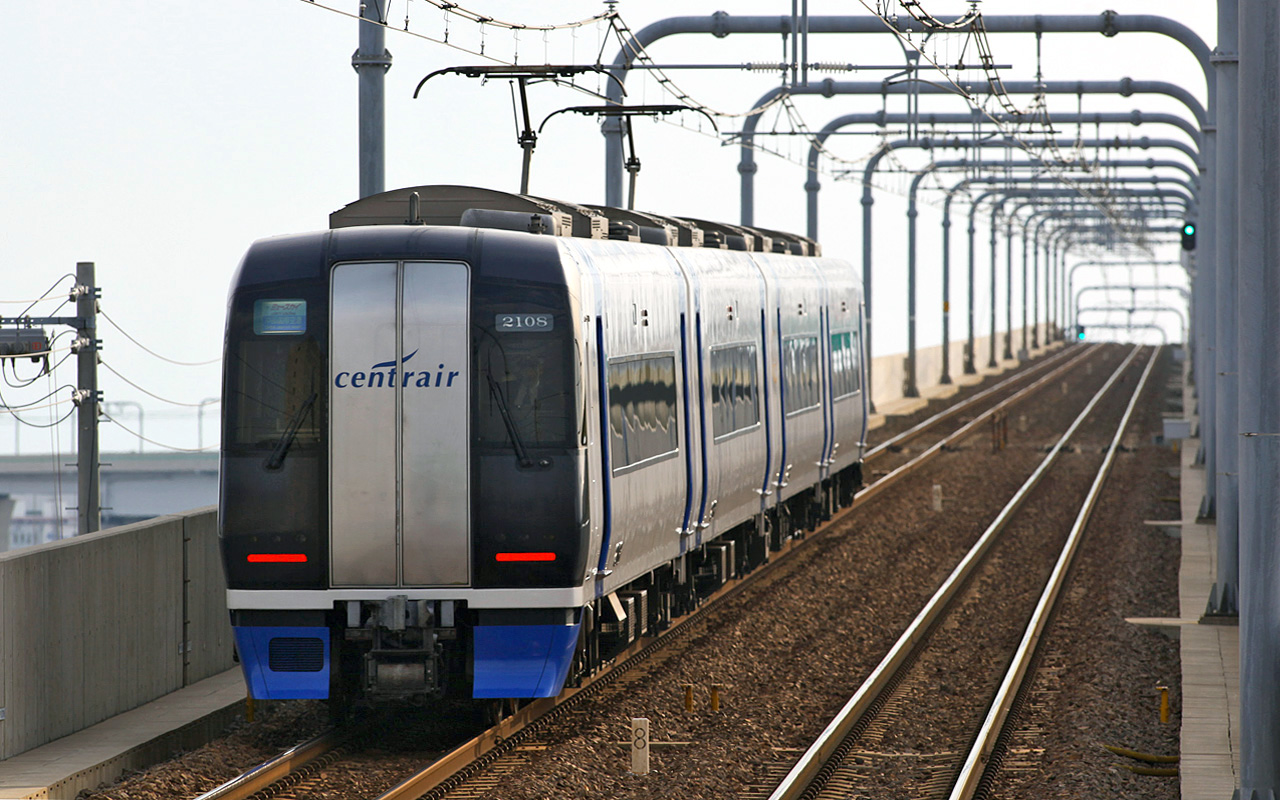
- A Meitetsu 2000 series EMU on the Airport Line

Overview
- Native name: 空港線
- Status: In service
- Owner: Central Japan International Airport Line Co., Ltd.
- Line number: TA
- Locale: Tokoname, Aichi
- Termini: Tokoname; Central Japan International Airport
- Stations: 3

Service
- Type: Commuter rail; Airport rail link
- System: Meitetsu
- Operator(s): Nagoya Railroad Co., Ltd.
- Daily ridership: 8,695 (FY2008)

History
- Opened: 29 January 2005; 21 years ago

Technical
- Line length: 4.2 km (2.6 mi)
- Track gauge: 1,067 mm (3 ft 6 in)
- Electrification: 1,500 V DC, overhead catenary
- Operating speed: 120 km/h (75 mph)

The Airport Line (空港線, Kūkō-sen) is a railway line in Aichi Prefecture, Japan, operated by the private railway operator Meitetsu (Nagoya Railroad), connecting Tokoname Station and Central Japan International Airport Station in Tokoname. The line opened, dual track and electrified, on 29 January 2005, and features a 1,076 m (3,530 ft) bridge over Ise Bay to the artificial island where the airport is situated. The line is operated as an extension of the Meitetsu Tokoname Line. In accordance with Japan's Railway Business Act, Meitetsu is a Category-2 operator between Central Japan International Airport Station and Tokoname Station while the track and related facilities are owned by Central Japan International Airport Line Company Ltd. (中部国際空港連絡鉄道株式会社).

== Stations ==
● L: Local (普通, futsū)
● S: Semi Express (準急, junkyū)
● E: Express (急行, kyūkō)
● R: Rapid Express (快速急行, kaisoku kyūkō)
● L: Limited Express (特急, tokkyū)
● MU: μSKY Limited Express (ミュースカイ, myū sukai)

All trains stop at stations marked "●" and pass stations marked "|". Some trains stop at "▲".

No.	Station name	Japanese	Distance (km)	L	S	E	R	L	MU
TA22	Tokoname	常滑	0.0	●	●	●	●	●	▲
TA23	Rinkū Tokoname	りんくう常滑	1.6	●	●	●	|	|	|
TA24	Central Japan International Airport	中部国際空港	4.2	●	●	●	●	●	●

== Rolling stock ==
- 1700 series
- 2000 series (Used on μ-Sky service)
- 2200 series

== See also ==
- List of railway lines in Japan
