= Meitetsu =

Japanese railway company

Nagoya Railroad Co., Ltd.

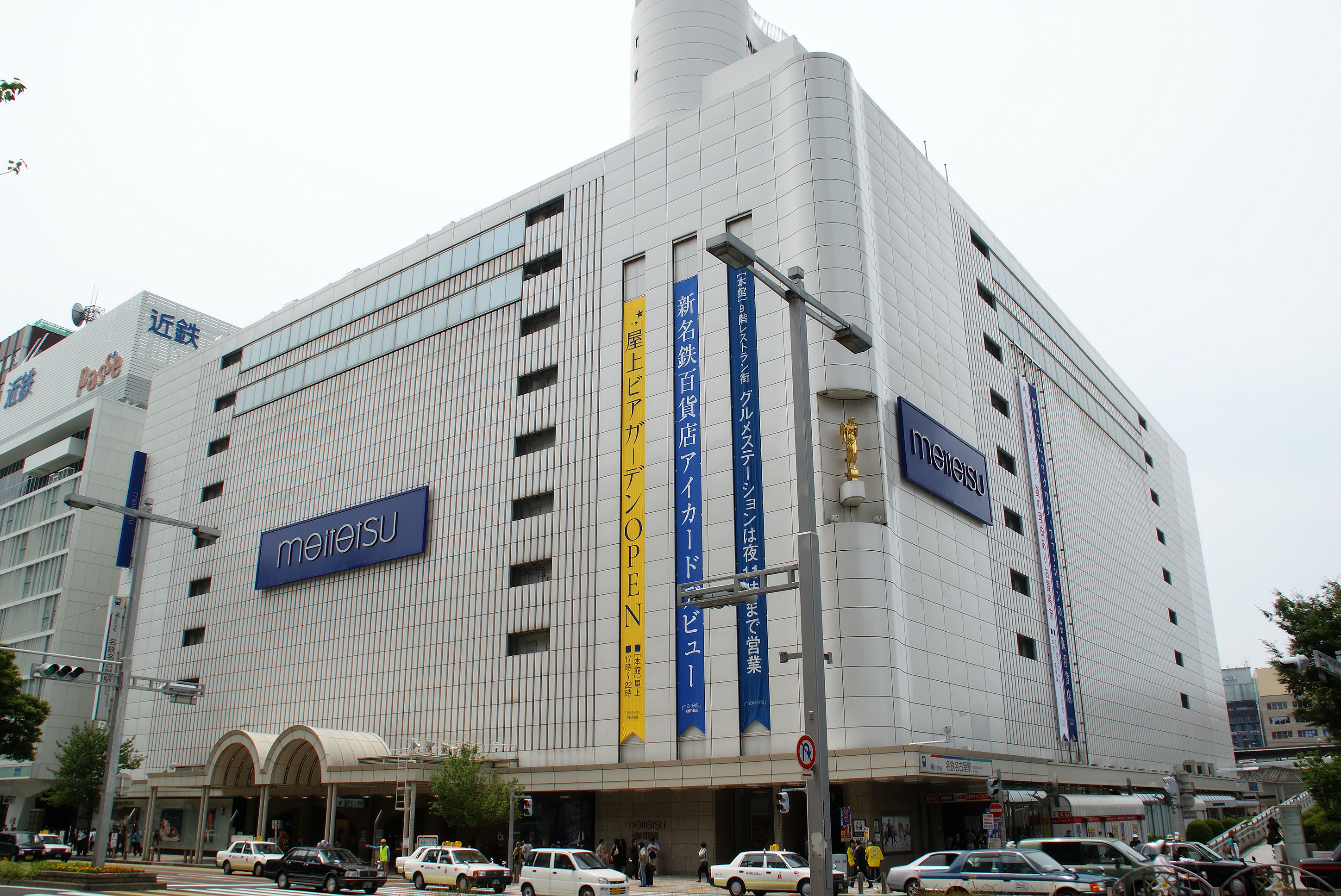
- Native name: 名古屋鉄道株式会社
- Type: Public KK
- Traded as: TYO: 9048; NAG: 9048
- Industry: Private railway
- Founded: June 25, 1894; 132 years ago (as the Aichi Basha Tetsudo); June 13, 1921; 105 years ago
- Headquarters: Nagoya, Japan
- Area served: Aichi Prefecture, Gifu Prefecture
- Key people: Takashi Ando (Chairman); Hiroki Takasaki (President)
- Website: www.meitetsu.co.jp/eng/

Nagoya Railroad Co., Ltd. (名古屋鉄道株式会社, Nagoya Tetsudō Kabushiki Gaisha), publicly trading as Meitetsu (名鉄), is a private railway company operating around Aichi Prefecture and Gifu Prefecture of Japan.

Meitetsu, headquartered in Nagoya, is a core company of the Meitetsu Group which is involved in transport, retail, hotels, leisure/tourism and real estate, among other industries.

Meitetsu is famous for its red trains, with almost all trains being either fully red or feature red in combination with white, black or unpainted stainless steel. Apart from special liveries, the only current train type to not feature red is the 2000 series "μ-Sky" trains used on Airport Line Limited Express services which feature a blue and white livery. The 300 series used on the through service to the Nagoya Municipal Subway Kamiiida Line has unpainted stainless steel with a thick pink stripe (the line colour of the Kamiiida Line) below a thin red stripe.

As of March 2025, Meitetsu, as one of the largest private railway companies in Japan, operated 20 railway lines, 444.2 kilometres (276.0 mi) of track, 276 stations, and 1,080 train cars.

== History ==
Meitetsu was founded on June 25, 1894, as the Aichi Basha Tetsudo, meaning Aichi Horsecar Company.

Over time, Meitetsu has acquired many small railway and interurban companies in the Nagoya area, many of whom were constructed and operated before and during World War II. For example, Meitetsu acquired its Kōwa Line on the Chita Peninsula from its merger with Chita Railroad on February 1, 1943, and it acquired its Mikawa Line from its merger with Mikawa Railroad.

Meitetsu's red trains include its famous 7000 series "Panorama Car" (which was retired in 2009 after a career lasting nearly half a century) and the Panorama Car Super, both of which offered panoramic views through their wide front windows. The most recent cars, however, are not solid red but rather brushed steel as in the case of the 4000 series and 5000 series, or white as in the case of the 1700 series and 2000 series.

While the company used to engage in the freight business and still possesses some freight locomotives, it no longer carries freight on a regular basis.

== Lines ==
Line map

Direction	Name	Japanese	Terminals	Length (km)
Main	Nagoya Main Line	名古屋本線	Toyohashi - Meitetsu Gifu	99.8
Eastern Aichi (Mikawa)	Toyokawa Line	豊川線	Kō - Toyokawa-inari	7.2
Eastern Aichi (Mikawa)	Nishio Line	西尾線	Shin Anjō - Kira Yoshida	24.7
Eastern Aichi (Mikawa)	Gamagōri Line	蒲郡線	Kira Yoshida - Gamagōri	17.6
Eastern Aichi (Mikawa)	Mikawa Line	三河線	Sanage - Hekinan	39.8
Eastern Aichi (Mikawa)	Toyota Line (Note: Through operation to/from the Tsurumai Line)	豊田線	Umetsubo - Akaike	15.2
Chita Peninsula	Tokoname Line	常滑線	Jingū-mae - Tokoname	29.3
Chita Peninsula	Airport Line	空港線	Tokoname - Central Japan Int'l Airport	4.2
Chita Peninsula	Chikkō Line	築港線	Ōe - Higashi Nagoyakō	1.5
Chita Peninsula	Kōwa Line	河和線	Ōtagawa - Kōwa	28.8
Chita Peninsula	Chita New Line	知多新線	Fuki - Utsumi	13.9
Western Aichi (Owari)	Seto Line	瀬戸線	Sakaemachi - Owari Seto	20.6
Western Aichi (Owari)	Tsushima Line	津島線	Sukaguchi - Tsushima	11.8
Western Aichi (Owari)	Bisai Line	尾西線	Yatomi - Tamanoi	30.9
Northern Aichi and Gifu	Inuyama Line	犬山線	Biwajima Junction - Shin Unuma	26.8
Northern Aichi and Gifu	Kakamigahara Line	各務原線	Meitetsu Gifu - Shin Unuma	17.6
Northern Aichi and Gifu	Hiromi Line	広見線	Inuyama - Mitake	22.3
Northern Aichi and Gifu	Komaki Line (Note: Through operation to/from the Kamiiida Line)	小牧線	Kami Iida - Inuyama	20.4
Northern Aichi and Gifu	Takehana Line	竹鼻線	Kasamatsu - Egira	10.3
Northern Aichi and Gifu	Hashima Line	羽島線	Egira - Shin Hashima	1.3

== Major stations ==
The Meitetsu limited express network

=== Major stations in Nagoya ===
- NH36 : Meitetsu Nagoya Station
- NH34 : Kanayama Station
- NH33 : Jingū-mae Station
- ST01 : Sakaemachi

=== Nagoya Line (east side) and Toyokawa Line ===
- NH01 : Toyohashi Station (Toyohashi)
- NH13 : Higashi Okazaki Station (Okazaki)
- NH17 : Shin Anjō Station (Anjō)
- NH19 : Chiryū Station (Chiryū)
- NH23 : Zengo Station (Toyoake)
- TK04 : Toyokawa-inari Station (Toyokawa)

=== Tokoname Line, Chikkō Line, and Airport Line ===
- TA09 : Ōtagawa Station (Tokai)
- TA12 : Asakura Station (Chita)
- TA22 : Tokoname Station (Tokoname)
- TA24 : Central Japan International Airport Station

=== Kōwa Line and Chita New Line ===
- KC08 : Agui Station (Agui)
- KC12 : Chita Handa Station (Handa)
- KC16 : Chita Taketoyo Station (Taketoyo)
- KC19 : Kōwa Station (Mihama)
- KC24 : Utsumi Station (Minami Chita)

=== Mikawa Line, Toyota Line, Nishio Line, and Gamagōri Line ===
- MY07 : Toyotashi Station (Toyota)
- TT06 : Nisshin Station (Nisshin)
- MU02 : Kariya Station (Kariya)
- MU06 : Mikawa Takahama Station (Takahama)
- MU10 : Hekinan-chūō Station (Hekinan)
- GN10 : Nishio Station (Nishio)
- GN13 : Kira Yoshida Station
- GN22 : Gamagōri Station (Gamagōri)

=== Nagoya Line (west side), Takehana Line, and Hashima Line ===
- NH42 : Sukaguchi Station (Kiyosu)
- NH47 : Kōnomiya Station (Inazawa)
- NH50 : Meitetsu Ichinomiya Station (Ichinomiya)
- NH56 : Kasamatsu Station (Kasamatsu)
- NH60 : Meitetsu Gifu Station (Gifu)
- TH07 : Hashima-shiyakusho-mae Station (Hashima)

=== Tsushima Line and Bisai Line ===
- TB01 : Jimokuji Station (Ama)
- TB07 : Tsushima Station (Tsushima)
- TB09 : Saya Station (Aisai)
- TB11 : Yatomi Station (Yatomi)
- BS06 : Morikami Station
- BS23 : Okuchō Station

=== Inuyama Line, Kakamigahara Line, and Hiromi Line ===
- IY03 : Kami Otai Station
- IY04 : Nishiharu Station (Kitanagoya)
- IY07 : Iwakura Station (Iwakura)
- IY10 : Kōnan Station (Kōnan)
- IY15 : Inuyama Station (Inuyama)
- IY17 : Shin Unuma Station
- KG06 : Mikakino Station
- KG08 : Kakamigahara-Shiyakusho-mae Station (Kakamigahara)
- HM06 : Shin Kani Station (Kani)
- HM10 : Mitake Station (Mitake)

=== Komaki Line ===
- KM06 : Komaki Station (Komaki)
- KM13 : Kami Iida Station

=== Seto Line ===
- ST06 : Ōzone Station
- ST15 : Owari Asahi Station (Owariasahi)
- ST20 : Owari Seto Station (Seto)

== Rolling stock ==
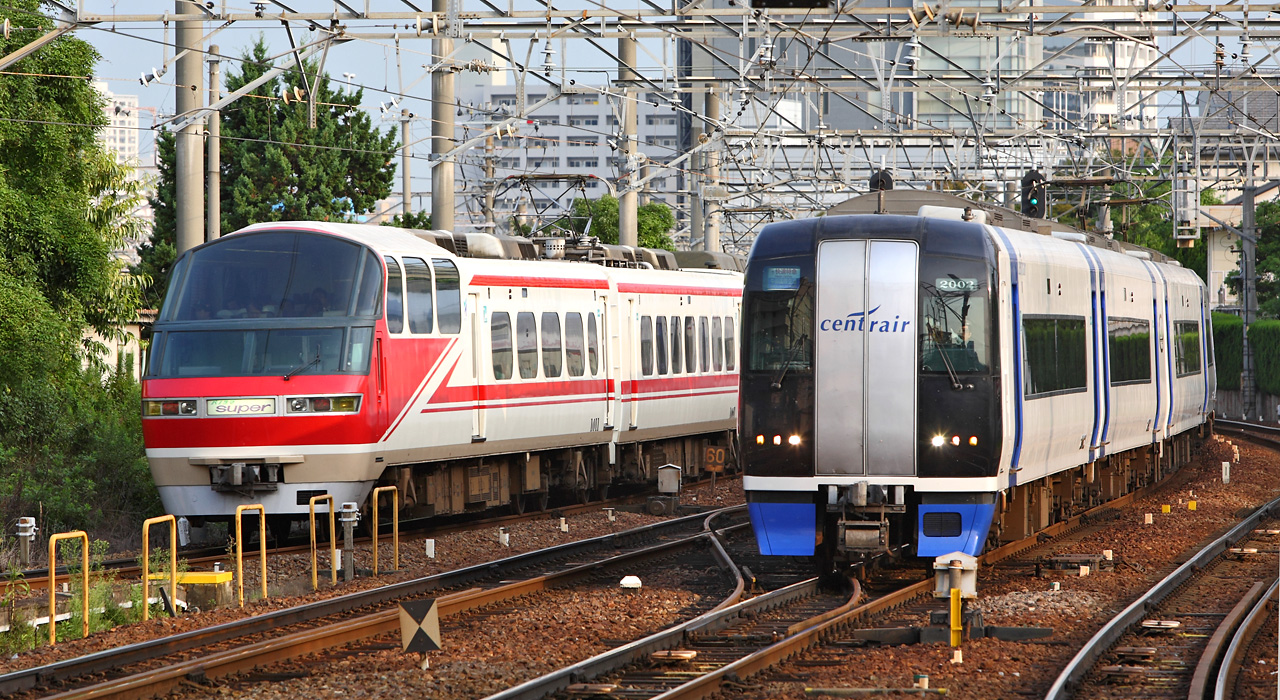
Meitetsu 1000 series "Panorama Super" (left) and 2000 series "Airport Limited Express [μSky]" (right)

Nippon Sharyo has produced nearly every car that Meitetsu operates or has operated, a notable exception being its Class EL120, an electric locomotive, which was produced by Toshiba, but very few units were produced for Meitetsu. The Class EL120 is one of the few locomotives that Meitetsu possesses.

The following are the train types that Meitetsu operates today, as well as selected types that Meitetsu has retired.

=== Limited express ===
- 1200 and 1230 series "Panorama Super"
- 1800/1850 series
- 2000 series "μ-Sky"
- 2200/2300 series

=== Commuter ===
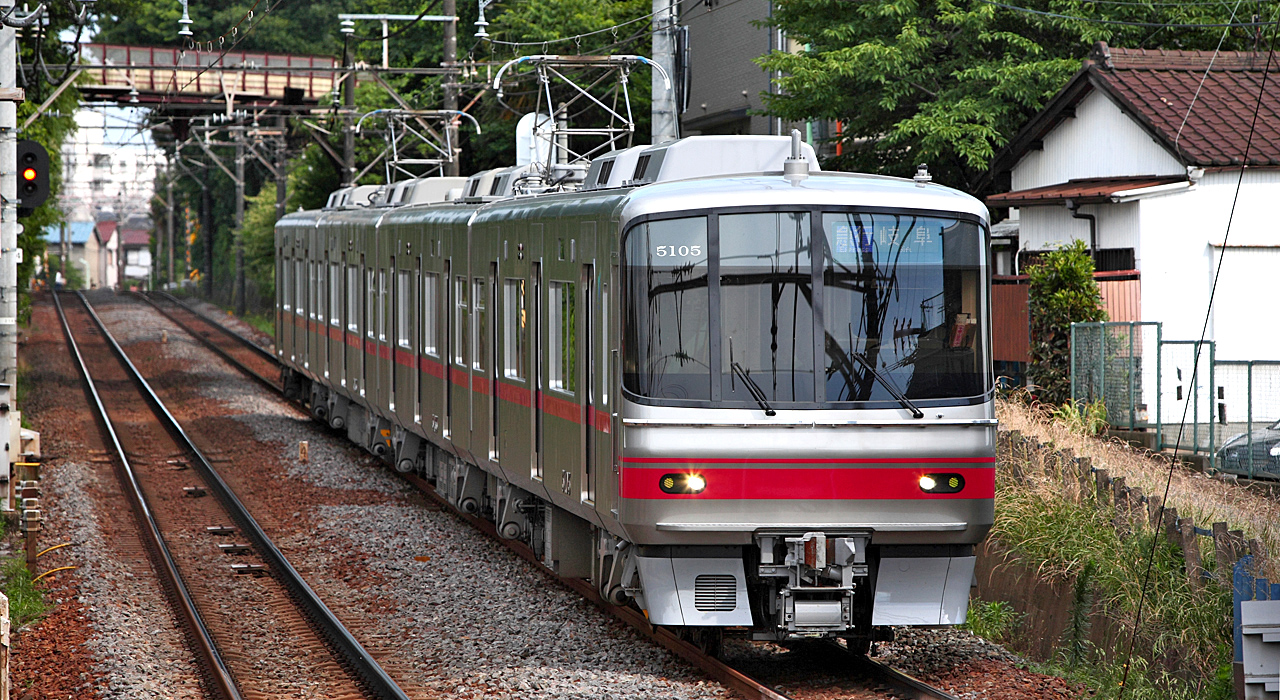
Meitetsu 5000 series commuter train

- 100/200 series
- 300 series
- 3100/3500/3700 series
- 3150 series
- 3300 series
- 4000 series
- 5000 series (2008)
- 6000/6500/6800 series
- 9100/9500 series

=== Withdrawn train types ===
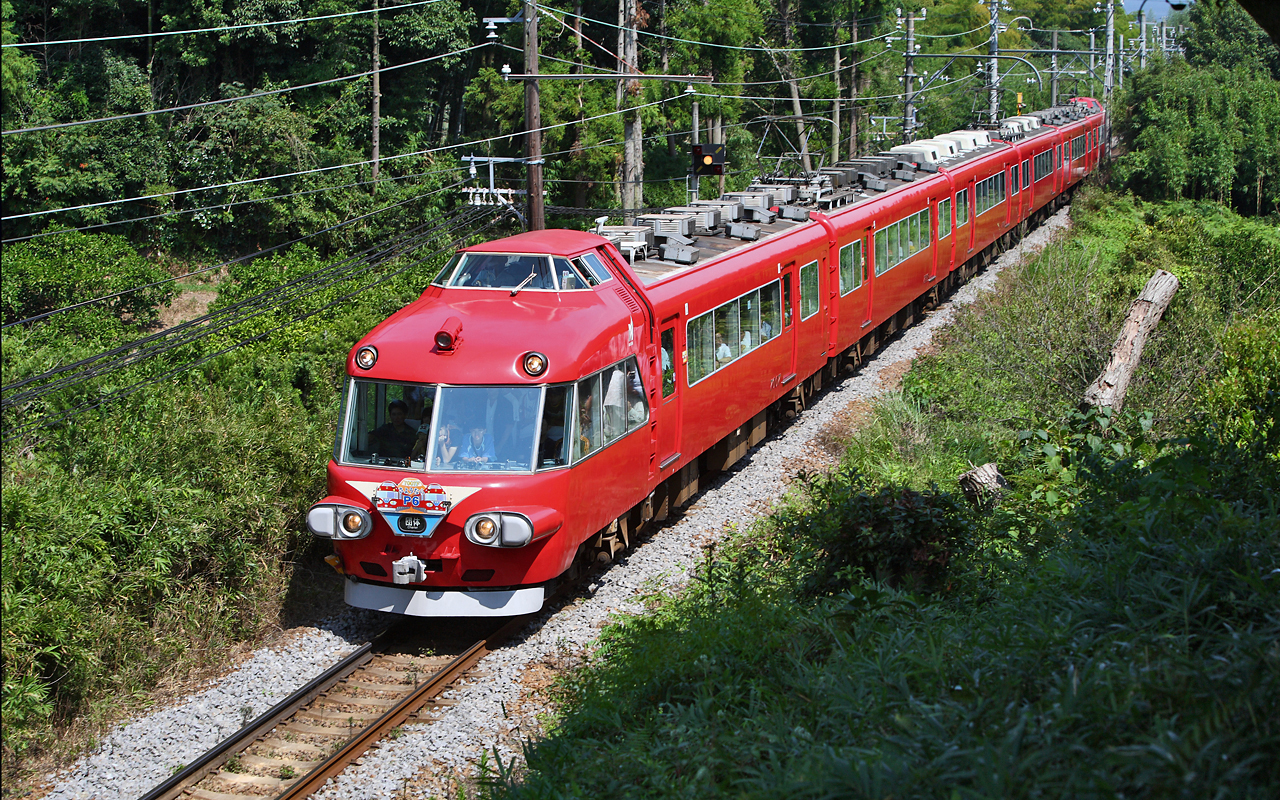
Meitetsu 7000 series "Panorama Car" train

- 1380 series
- 1600 series "Panorama Super"
- 1700 series
- 7000 series "Panorama Car"
- 5000 series (1955)
- 5300/5700 series

=== Electric locomotives ===
- Meitetsu DeKi 300
- Meitetsu DeKi 400
- Meitetsu DeKi 600
- Meitetsu Class EL120

== Rationalization ==
Line map of Meitetsu closed lines

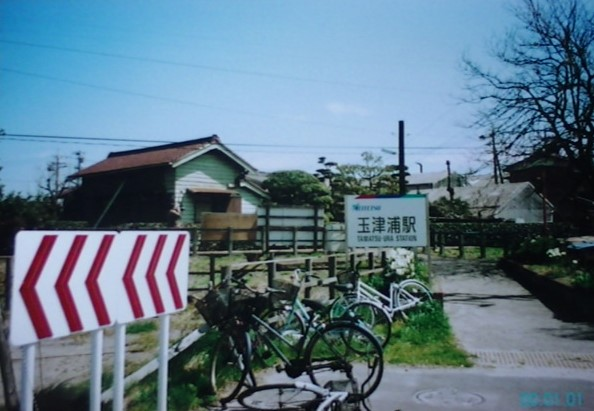
Tamatsu-ura Station, one of the stations that were closed due to low passengers

Meitetsu inherited many deficit lines as a result of multiple mergers. The railway lines were also seeing competition from cars due to Aichi prefecture's notable automobile industry in cities such as Toyota. Meitetsu has abolished over 15 lines over the past 70 years, while also closing sections with low ridership. Additionally, with the collapse of the asset price bubble in the 1990s, and the privatization of JNR, formation of Central Japan Railway Company, the company also cut the number of companies in its corporate group from 250 to 139.
