= Meitetsu 3300 series =

Japanese train type

The Meitetsu 3300 series and 3150 series (名鉄3300系・3150系) are commuter electric multiple unit (EMU) train types operated by the private railway operator Meitetsu in Japan since 2004.

== 3300 series ==
Meitetsu 3300 series
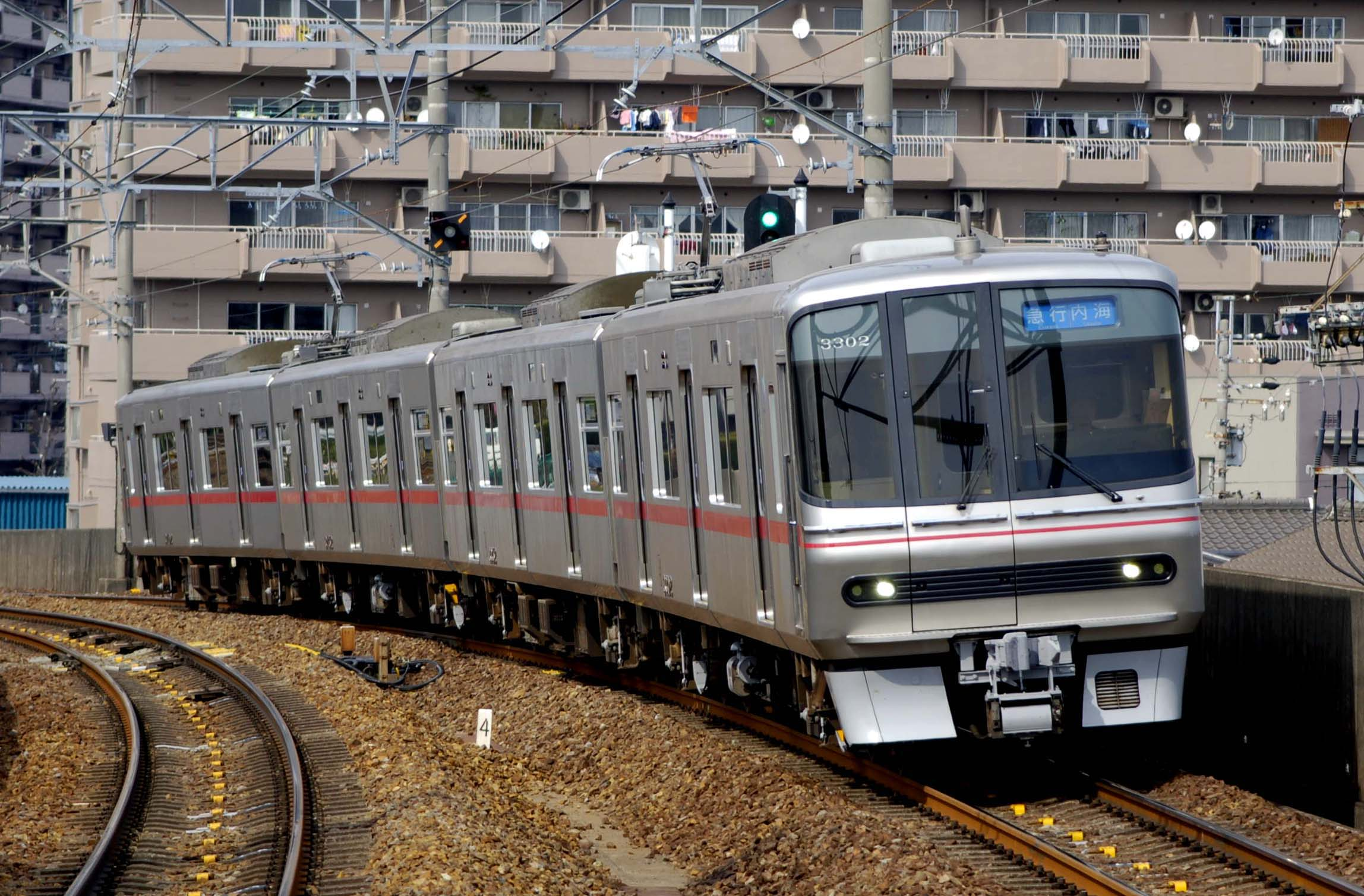
- 3300 series set 3302 in April 2007
- In service: 2004–
- Manufacturer: Nippon Sharyo
- Built at: Toyokawa, Aichi
- Constructed: 2004–
- Entered service: 15 November 2004
- Number built: 28 vehicles (7 sets)
- Number in service: 20 vehicles (5 sets)
- Formation: 4 cars per set
- Fleet numbers: 3301–3307
- Operators: Meitetsu

Specifications
- Car body construction: Stainless steel
- Car length: 19 m (62 ft 4 in)
- Doors: 3 pairs per side
- Maximum speed: 130 km/h (81 mph)
- Traction system: Variable frequency (IGBT)
- Electric system(s): 1,500 V DC overhead catenary
- Current collector(s): Single-arm pantograph
- Safety system(s): Meitetsu ATS
- Multiple working: 3500 series
- Track gauge: 1,067 mm (3 ft 6 in)

=== Design ===
The 3300 series trains were based on the earlier 300 series trains, which were the first stainless steel body trains to be operated by Meitetsu, although whereas the 300 series trains had 20 m (65 ft 7 in) long cars with four pairs of sliding doors per side, the 3300 series have 19 m (62 ft 4 in) long cars and three pairs of sliding doors per side.

=== Formations ===
As of 1 April 2015, five four-car sets were in operation, formed as shown below, with two motored ("M") cars and two non-powered trailer ("T") cars.

Designation	Tc	M	T	Mc
Numbering	3300	3350	3450	3400
Capacity (total/seated)	117/44	128/50	128/50	114/44

- The two motored cars are each fitted with one single-arm pantograph.

=== Interior ===
Passenger accommodation consists mostly of transverse seating with some longitudinal bench seats.

=== Special liveries ===
In January 2015, sets 3303 and 3304 were decorated to mark the 400th anniversary of the death of Tokugawa Ieyasu. Each car is decorated with vinyls representing the four seasons. The two trains are scheduled to carry these liveries until 31 December 2015.

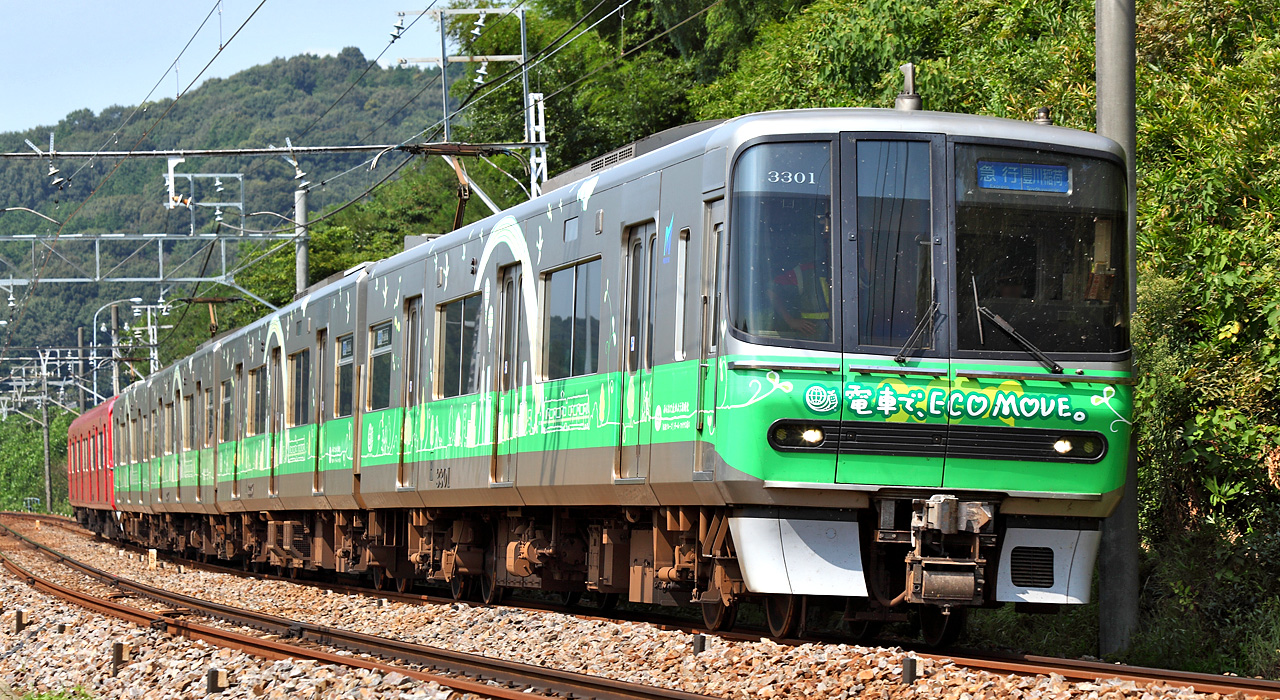
Set 3301 with "Eco Move Train" vinyls in August 2009

=== History ===
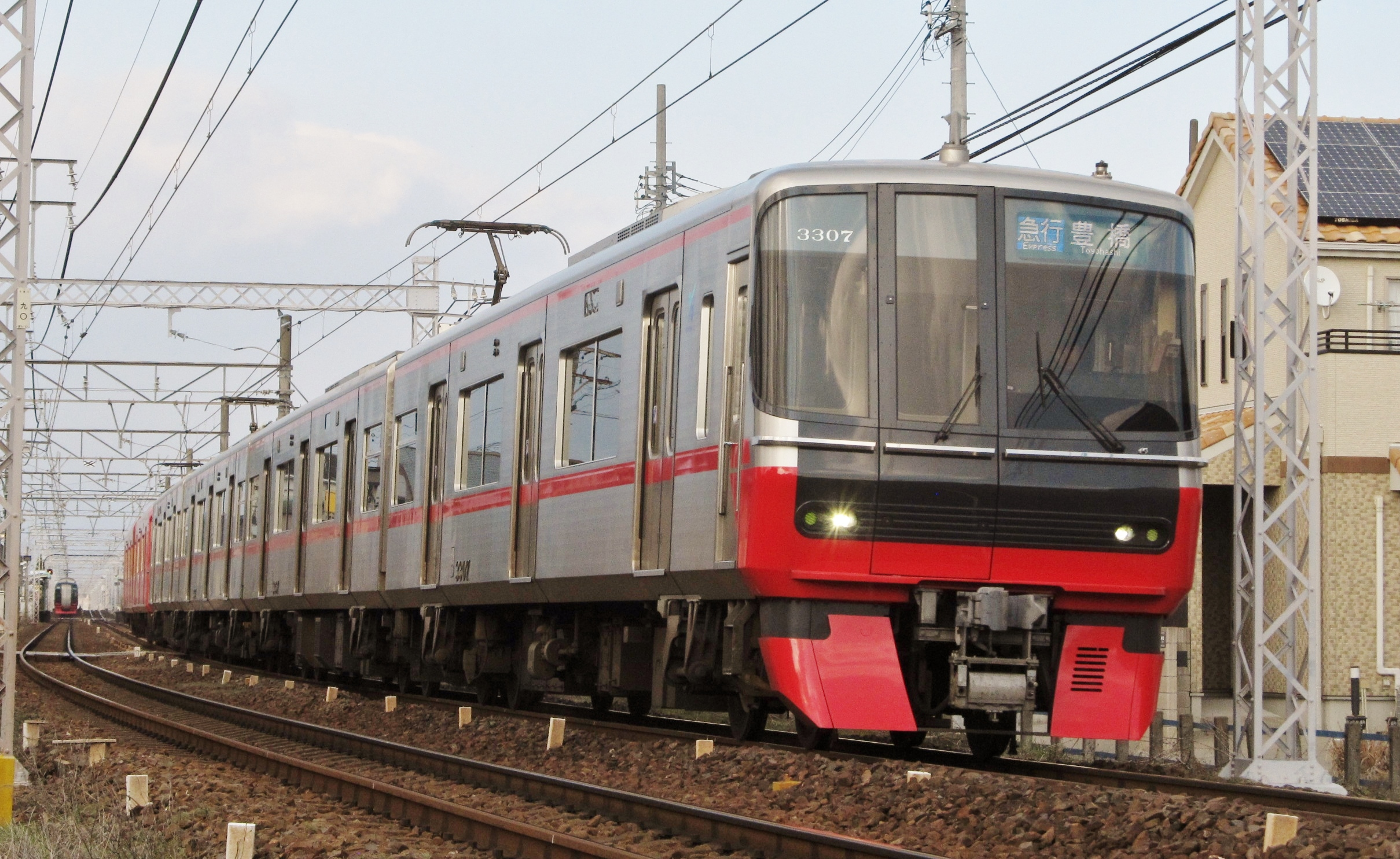
Set 3307 in December 2015

First introduced in 2004, five four-car sets were built by 2005. A sixth set, 3306, was delivered in January 2015. A seventh set, 3307, was delivered in August 2015. This set differs from earlier sets in having the revised livery applied to 3150 series set 3167.

== 3150 series ==
Meitetsu 3150 series
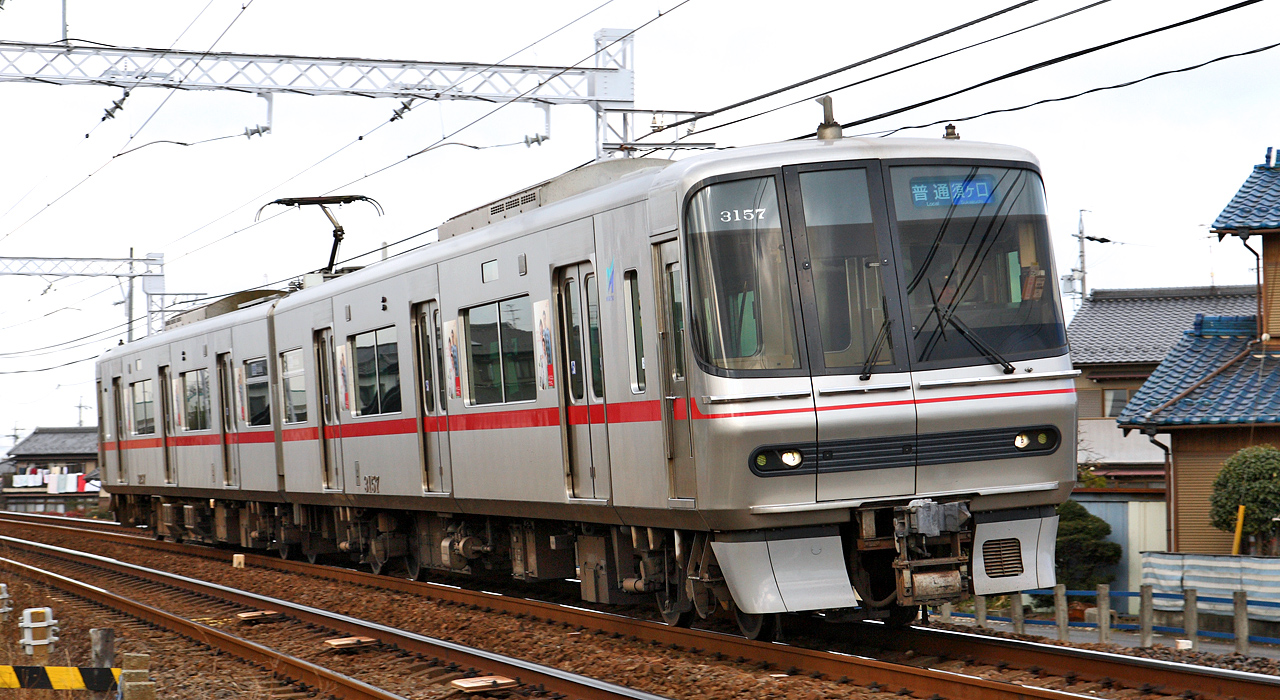
- 3150 series set 3157 in December 2008
- In service: 2004–
- Manufacturer: Nippon Sharyo
- Built at: Toyokawa, Aichi
- Constructed: 2004–
- Entered service: 15 November 2004
- Number built: 36 vehicles (18 sets)
- Number in service: 32 vehicles (16 sets)
- Formation: 2 cars per set
- Fleet numbers: 3151–3168
- Operators: Meitetsu

Specifications
- Car body construction: Stainless steel
- Car length: 19 m (62 ft 4 in)
- Doors: 3 pairs per side
- Maximum speed: 130 km/h (81 mph)
- Traction system: Variable frequency (IGBT)
- Electric system(s): 1,500 V DC overhead catenary
- Current collector(s): Single-arm pantograph
- Safety system(s): Meitetsu ATS
- Multiple working: 2200 series
- Track gauge: 1,067 mm (3 ft 6 in)

=== Design ===
Like the four-car 3300 series trains, the 3150 series trains were based on the earlier 300 series trains, which were the first stainless steel body trains to be operated by Meitetsu, although whereas the 300 series trains had 20 m (65 ft 7 in) long cars with four pairs of sliding doors per side, the 3150 series have 19 m (62 ft 4 in) long cars and three pairs of sliding doors per side.

=== Formations ===
As of 1 April 2015, 16 two-car sets were in operation, formed as shown below, with one driving motored ("Mc") car and one non-powered driving trailer ("Tc") car.

Designation	Tc	Mc
Numbering	3150	3250
Capacity (total/seated)	117/44	114/44

- The "Mc" car is fitted with one single-arm pantograph.

=== Interior ===
Passenger accommodation in the early sets consists mostly of transverse seating with some longitudinal bench seats, while sets 3155 onwards have longitudinal seating throughout.

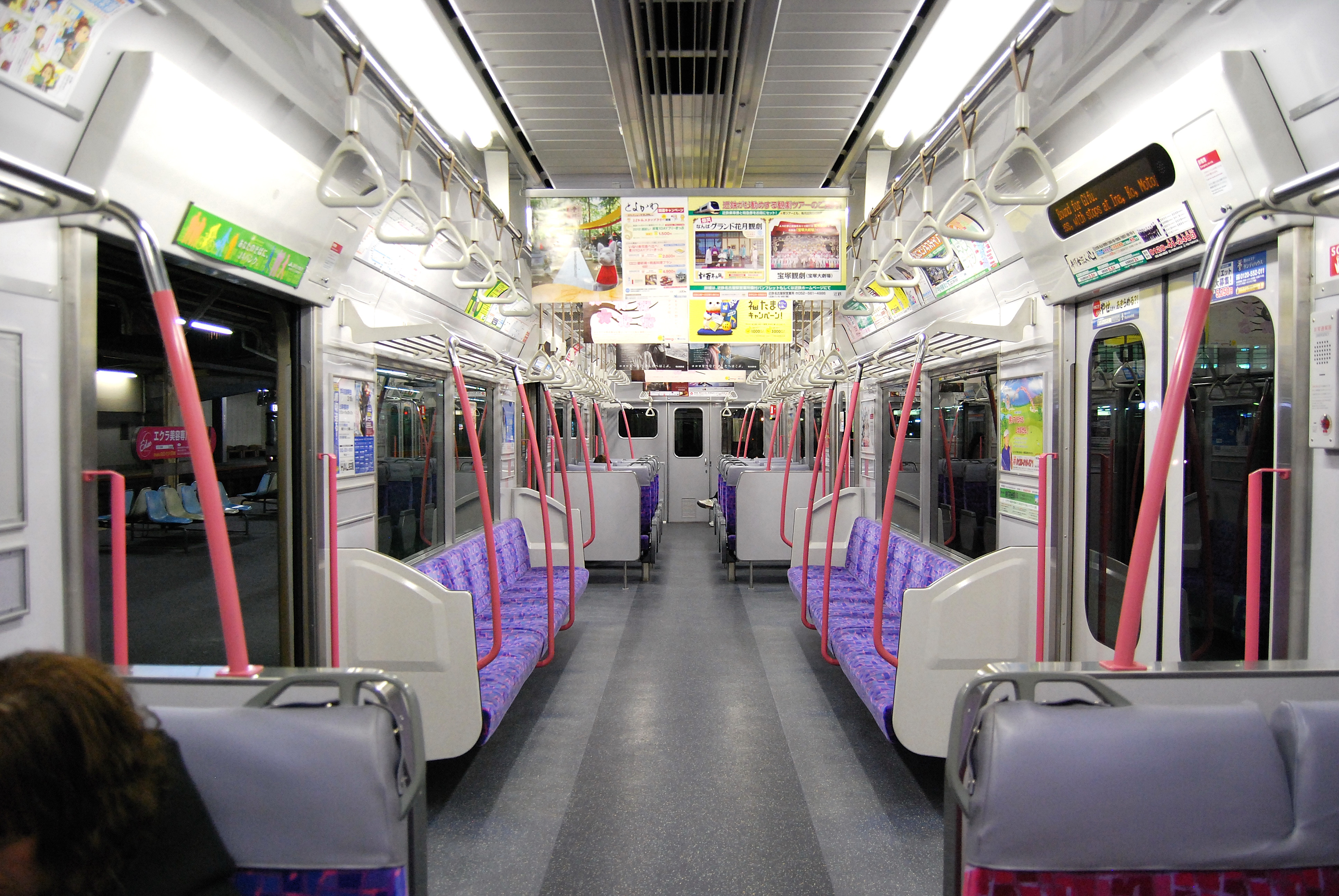
Interior view

=== History ===
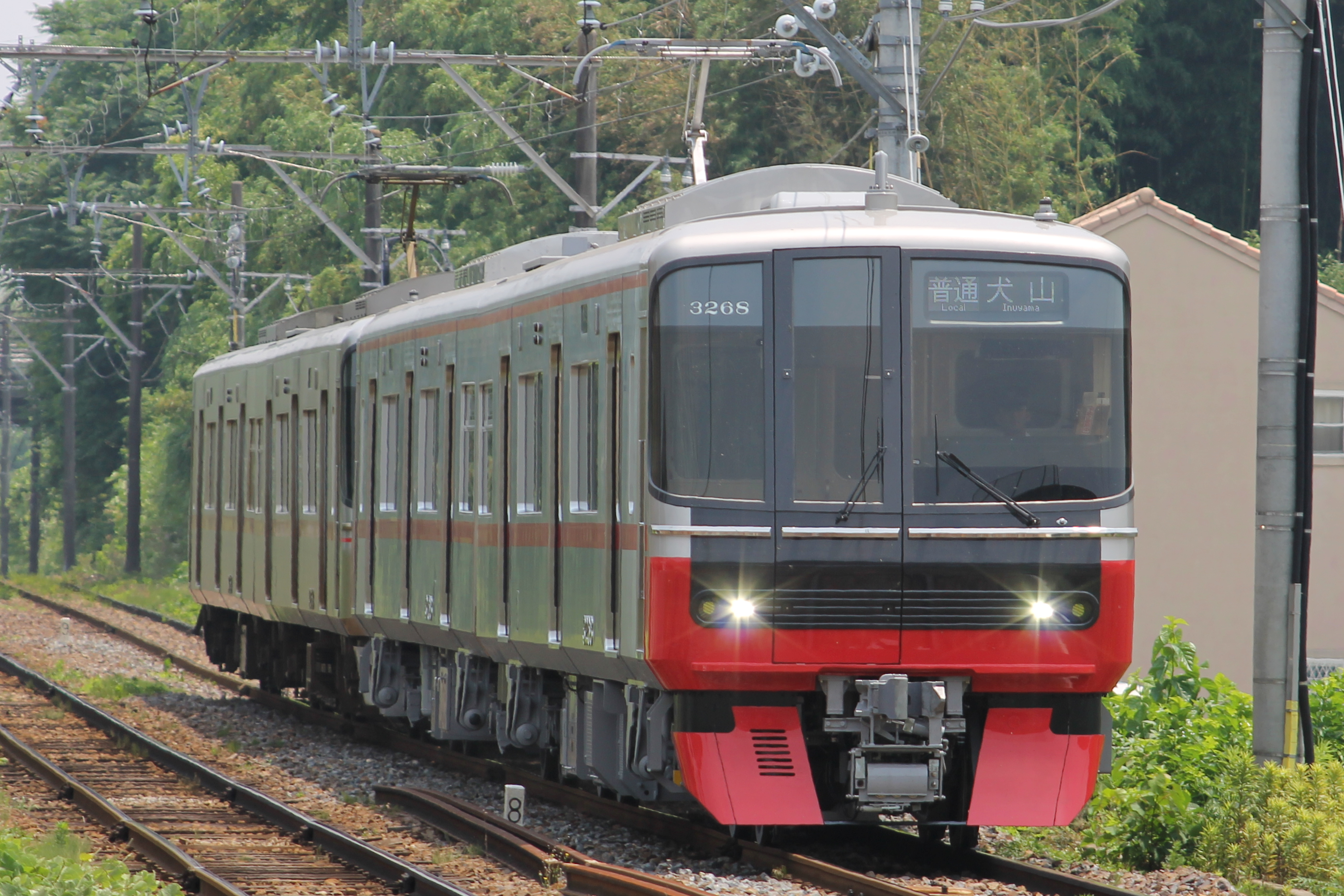
2015 batch set 3168, June 2015

The trains were first introduced in 2004.

Two new sets, 3167 and 3168, were delivered in April and May 2015 respectively. These sets feature a revised livery.
