= Meitetsu 6000 series =

Japanese train type

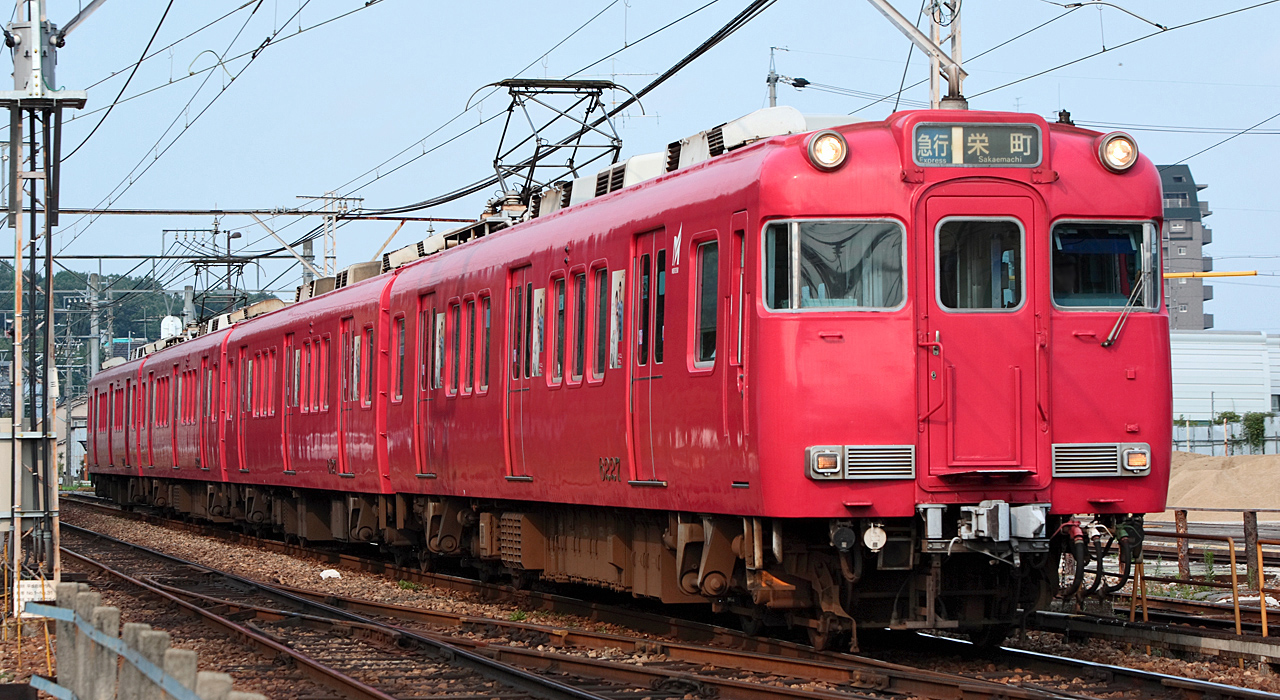
- Meitetsu 6000 Series
- In service: 1976–present
- Manufacturer: Nippon Sharyo
- Constructed: 1976–1992
- Entered service: 21 December 1976
- Operator: Nagoya Railroad

Specifications
- Doors: 3 per side
- Traction system: Resistor control (6000 series); Field chopper control (6500 series); Magnetic field excitation control (6800 series)
- Transmission: 14:85 gear ratio (6000 & 6500 series); 15:84 gear ratio (6800 series)
- Electric system: 1,500 V DC
- Current collection: Overhead catenary
- Safety system: Meitetsu ATS
- Track gauge: 1,067 mm (3 ft 6 in)

Notes/references
- This train won the 20th Blue Ribbon Award in 1977.

The Meitetsu 6000 series (名鉄6000系) is a commuter electric multiple unit type operated by Nagoya Railroad (Meitetsu) in Japan since 1976. In the narrow sense of the word, the 6000 series is the type produced from 1976, but in the broad sense, it includes later series, namely the 6500 series, and the 6800 series.

== 6000 series ==
The 6000 series began service in 1976.

In 1977, the series won the Blue Ribbon Award for outstanding design by the Japan Railfan Club.

By 1984, 140 cars had been manufactured.

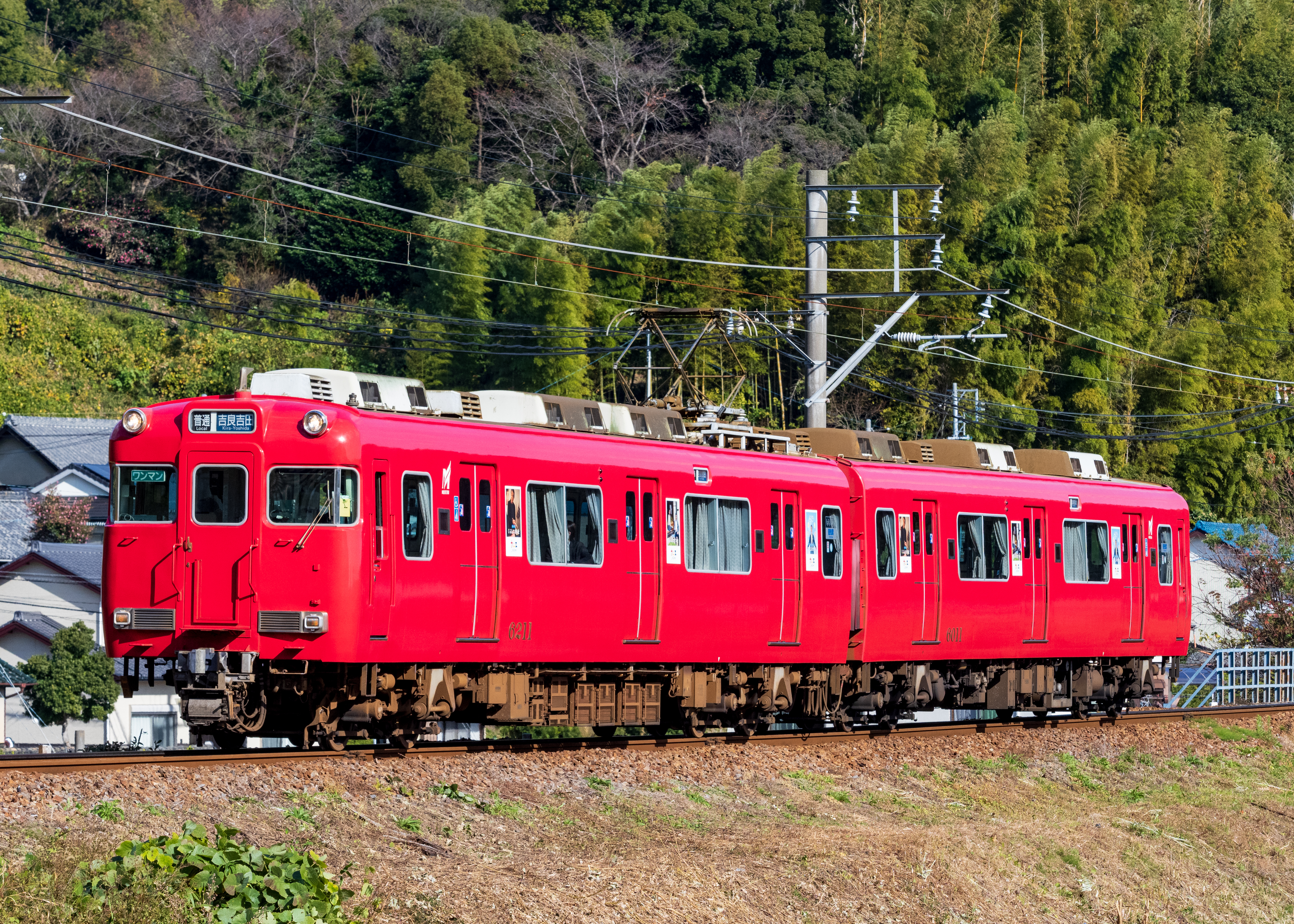
Set 6011 on the Gamagōri Line

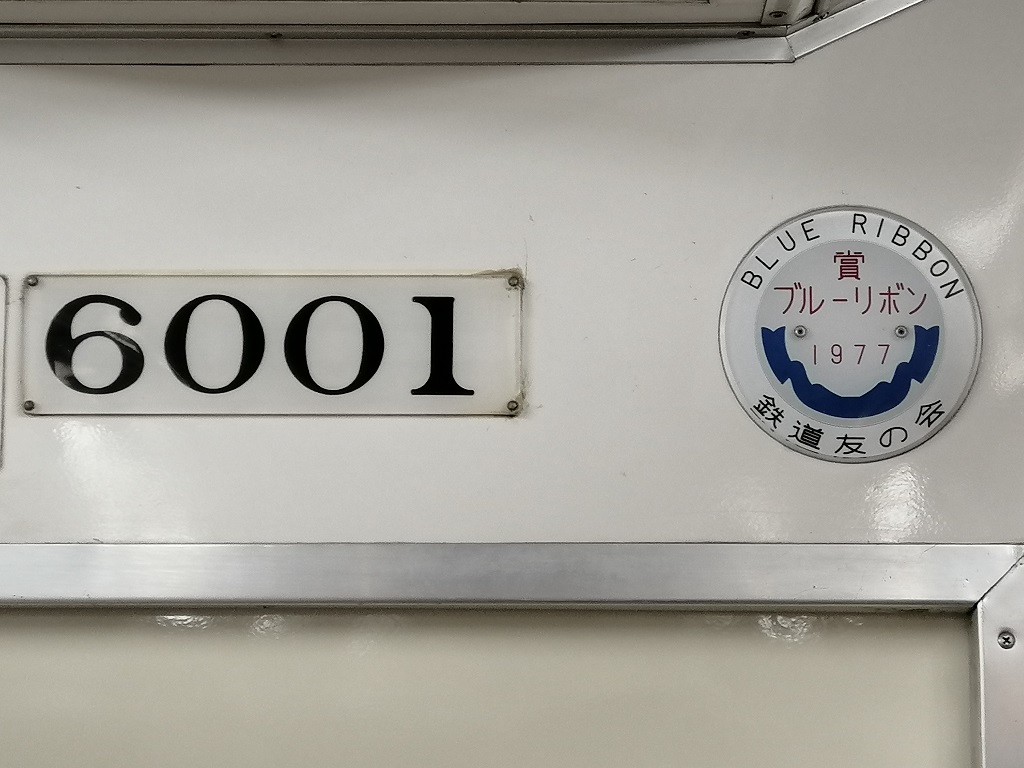
Blue Ribbon Award plaque inside car 6001

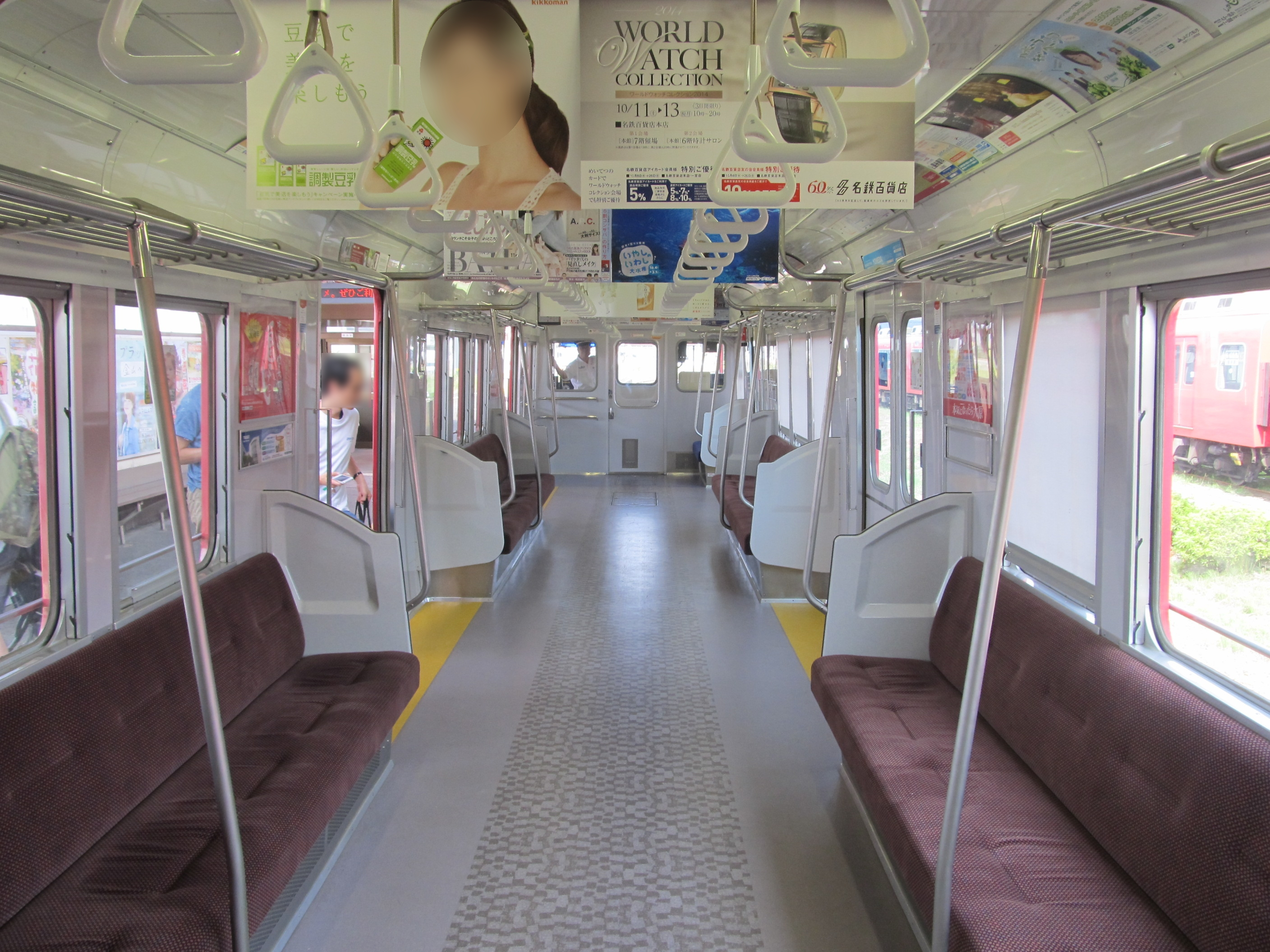
Inside of a 6000 series car after refurbishment

== 6500 series ==
By 1984, it had become apparent that the 6000 series needed to be expanded. However, at this time, a design change was considered. At this time, regenerative braking via field choppers had started to become commonplace as a proven technology.

The first sets appeared in 1984.

The sixth batch of the series featured a complete remodel of the cab exterior.

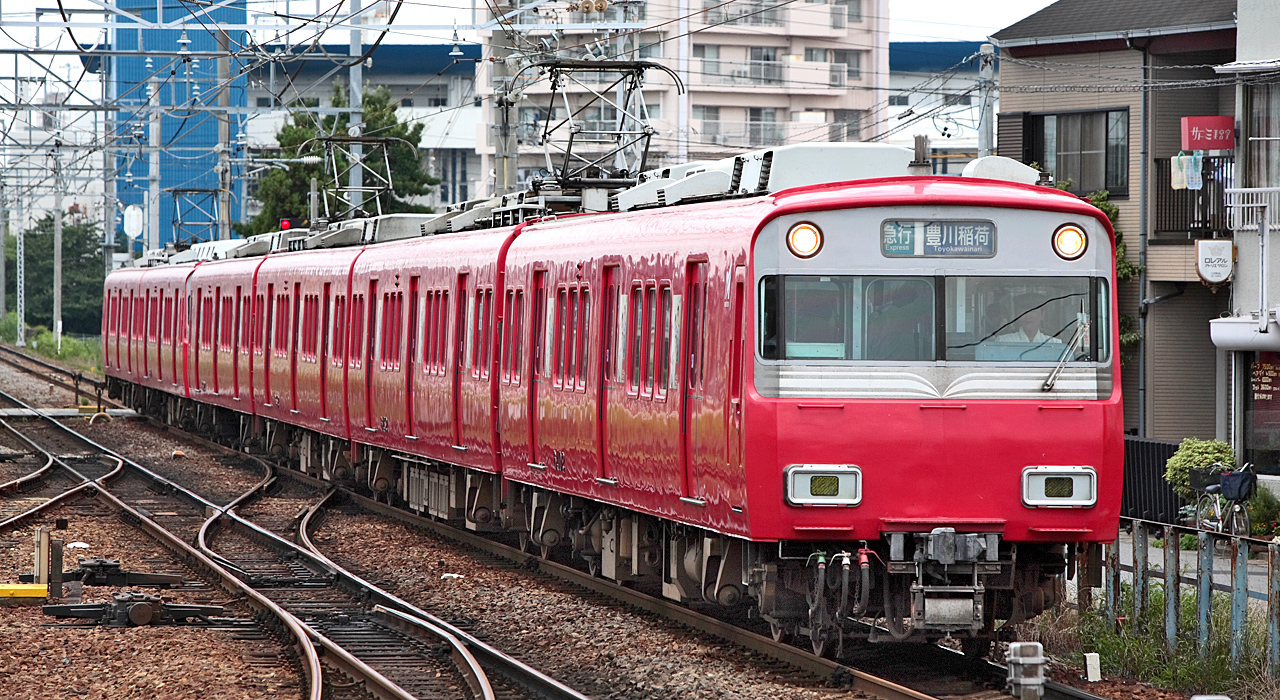
Earlier 6500 series batch set 6402

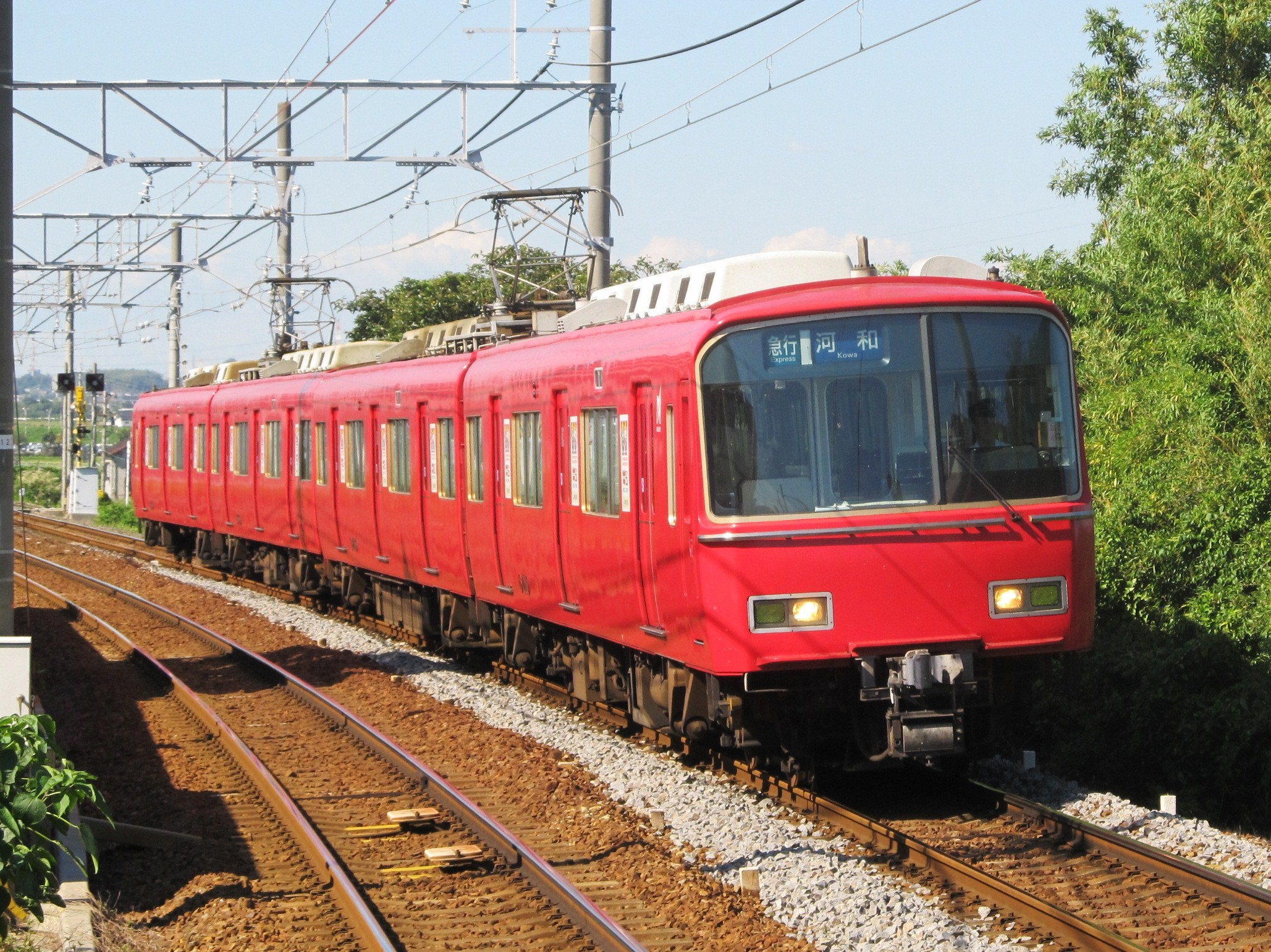
Later batch 6500 series with reworked exterior

== 6800 series ==
The 6800 series began appearing in 1987 as an upgraded 2-car version of the 6000 series.

Sets constructed from 1989 onwards featured updated bodywork.

By 1991, 39 2-car trains had been constructed.

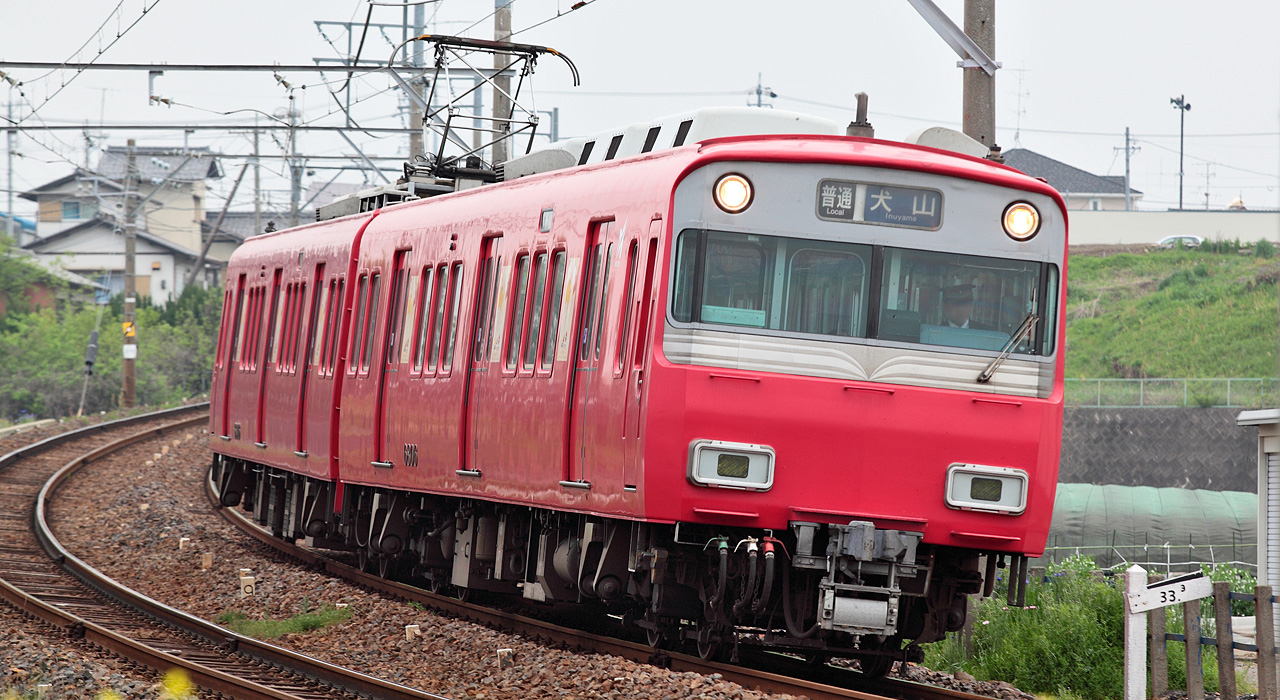
Earlier 6800 series batches feature the same bodywork as the 6500 series.

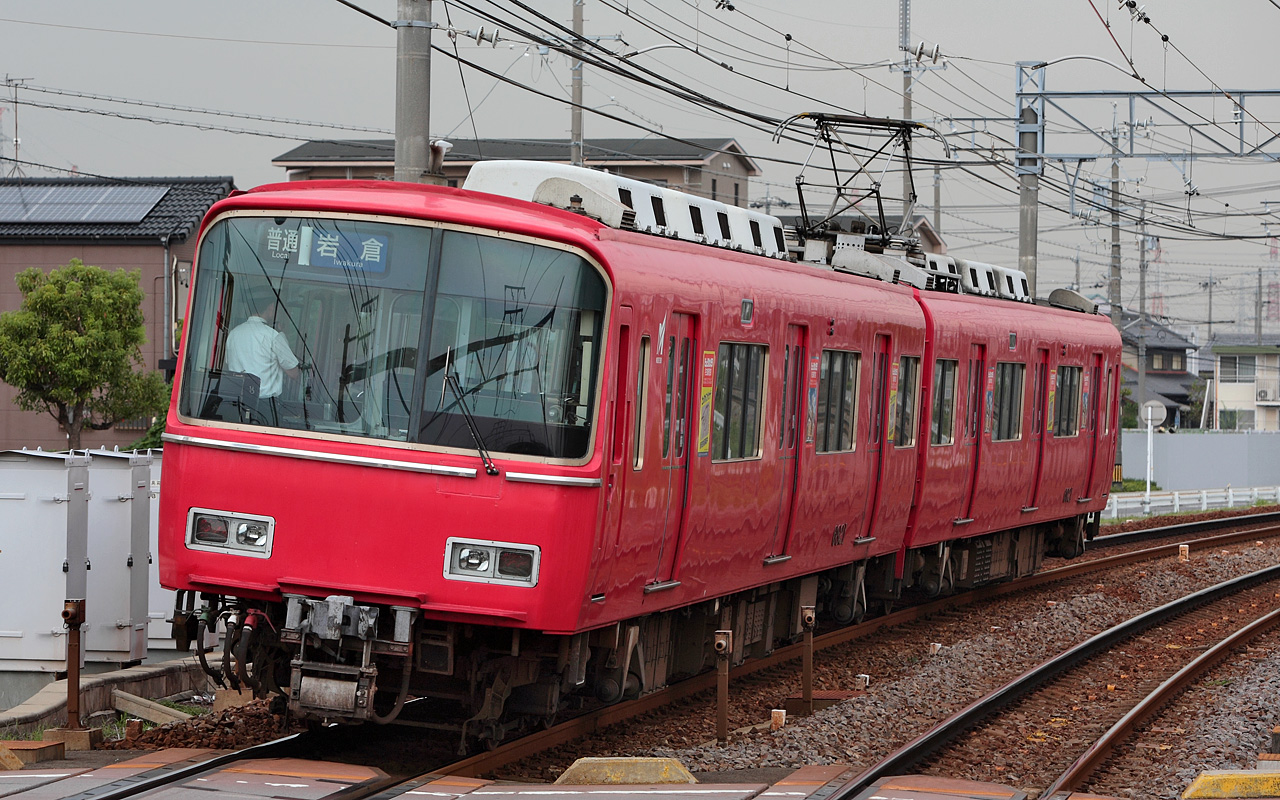
Later batch 6800 series batch with updated bodywork
