= Meitetsu 2200 series =

Japanese train type

Meitetsu 2200/2300 series
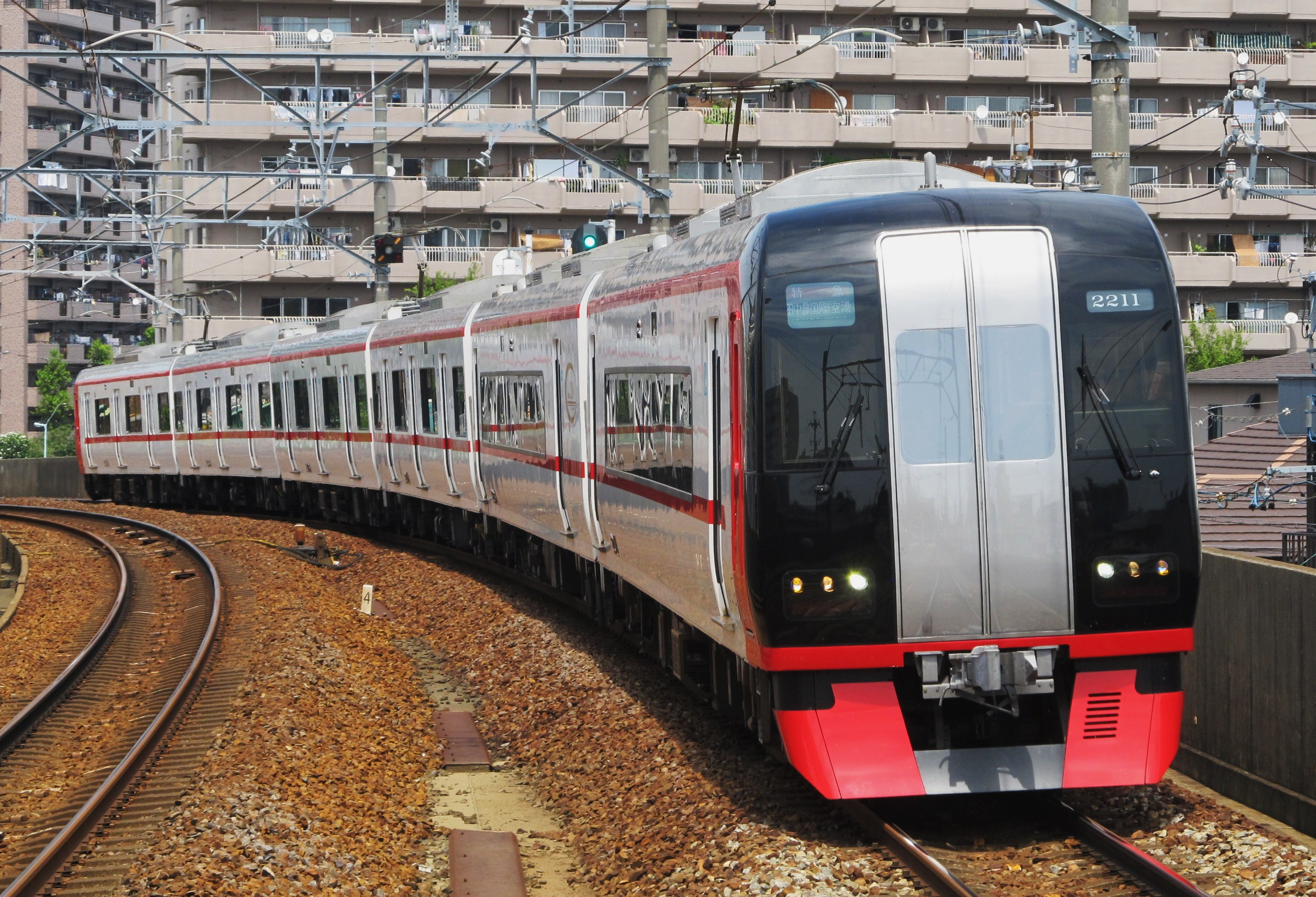
- Set 2211 with updated livery, August 2015
- In service: 29 January 2005 – present
- Manufacturer: Nippon Sharyo
- Replaced: 1700 series (2230 subseries)
- Constructed: 2004–
- Number built: 102 vehicles (17 sets, including 16 former 1700 series cars) (as of December 2021)
- Number in service: 54 vehicles (9 sets) (as of April 2015)
- Formation: 6 cars per trainset
- Fleet numbers: 2201–2213; 2231–2234
- Operators: Meitetsu

Specifications
- Car length: 18,900 mm (62 ft 0 in) (reserved-seat end car); 19,000 mm (62 ft 4 in) (reserved-seat int. car); 18,230 mm (59 ft 10 in) (commuter int. cars); 18,115 mm (59 ft 5 in) (commuter end car)
- Width: 2,700 mm (8 ft 10 in)
- Doors: 2/3 pairs per side
- Maximum speed: 120 km/h (75 mph)
- Electric system(s): 1,500 V DC overhead
- Safety system(s): Meitetsu ATS
- Track gauge: 1,067 mm (3 ft 6 in)

Notes/references
- Specification sources: (unless otherwise noted)

The Meitetsu 2200/2300 series (名鉄2200・2300系) is an electric multiple unit (EMU) train type operated by the private railway operator Meitetsu in Japan since January 2005.

== Formation ==
The sets are formed as follows.

| | ← Toyohashi Meitetsu Gifu → | | | | | |
| Car No. | 1 | 2 | 3 | 4 | 5 | 6 |
| Designation | Mo 2200 (Mc1) | Sa 2250 (T1) | Sa 2400 (T2) | Mo 2450 (M) | Sa 2350 (T2') | Mo 2300 (Mc2) |
| Weight (t) | 41.7 | 33.2 | 28.6 | 36.5 | 28.6 | 38.5 |
| Capacity (total/seated) | 46 | 46 | 123/50 | 123/50 | 123/50 | 112/42 |

- Cars 1, 4, and 6 each have a single-arm pantograph.
- Car 4 is designated as a mildly air-conditioned car.

== Interior ==
The 2200 series cars consist of transverse reclining seating throughout with a seat pitch of 1,000 millimetres (39 in), most of which are arranged in a 2+2 abreast configuration. Car 2 is equipped with a men's toilet and a universal-access toilet. The 2300 series cars adopt a commuter-oriented seating configuration based on that of the 3300 series, consisting of longitudinal bench seating as well as transverse seating bays.

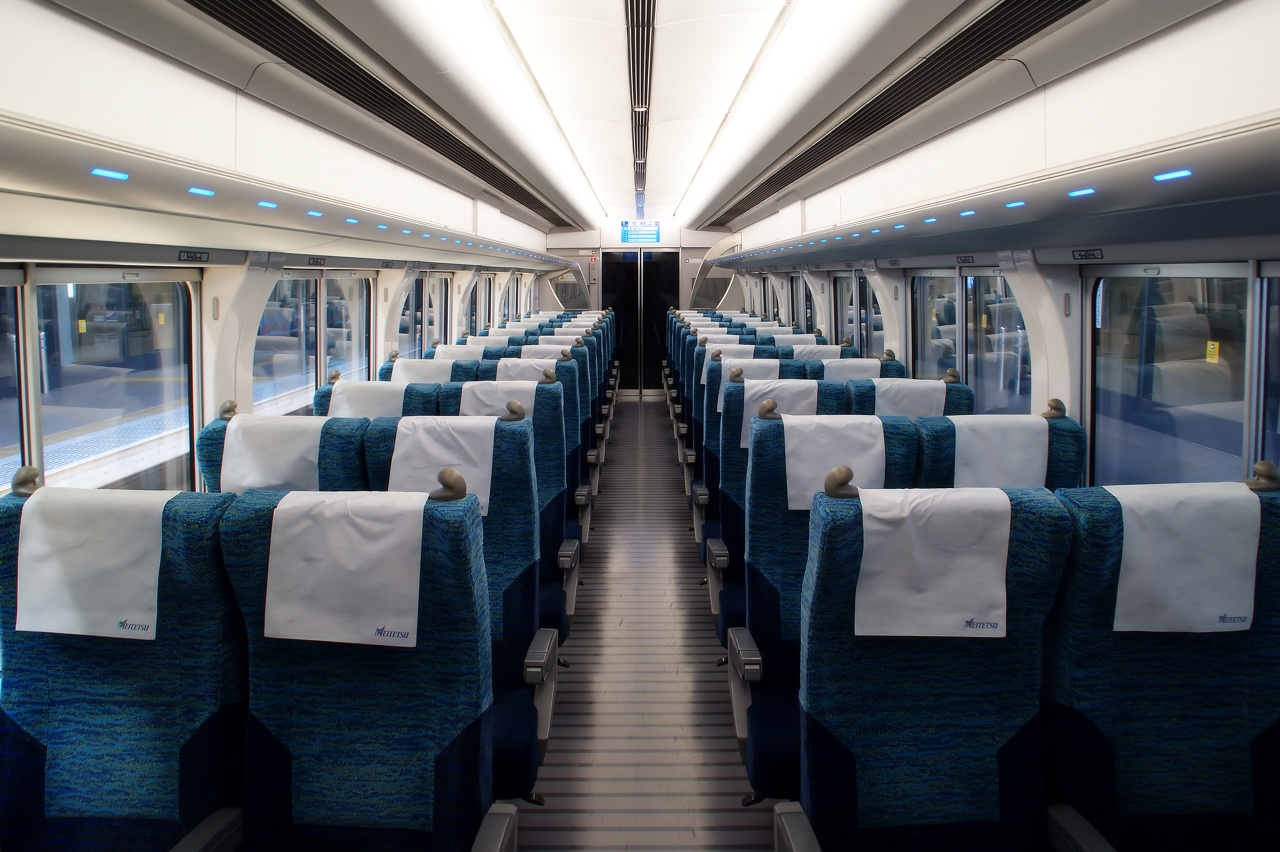
Interior of a 2200 series car

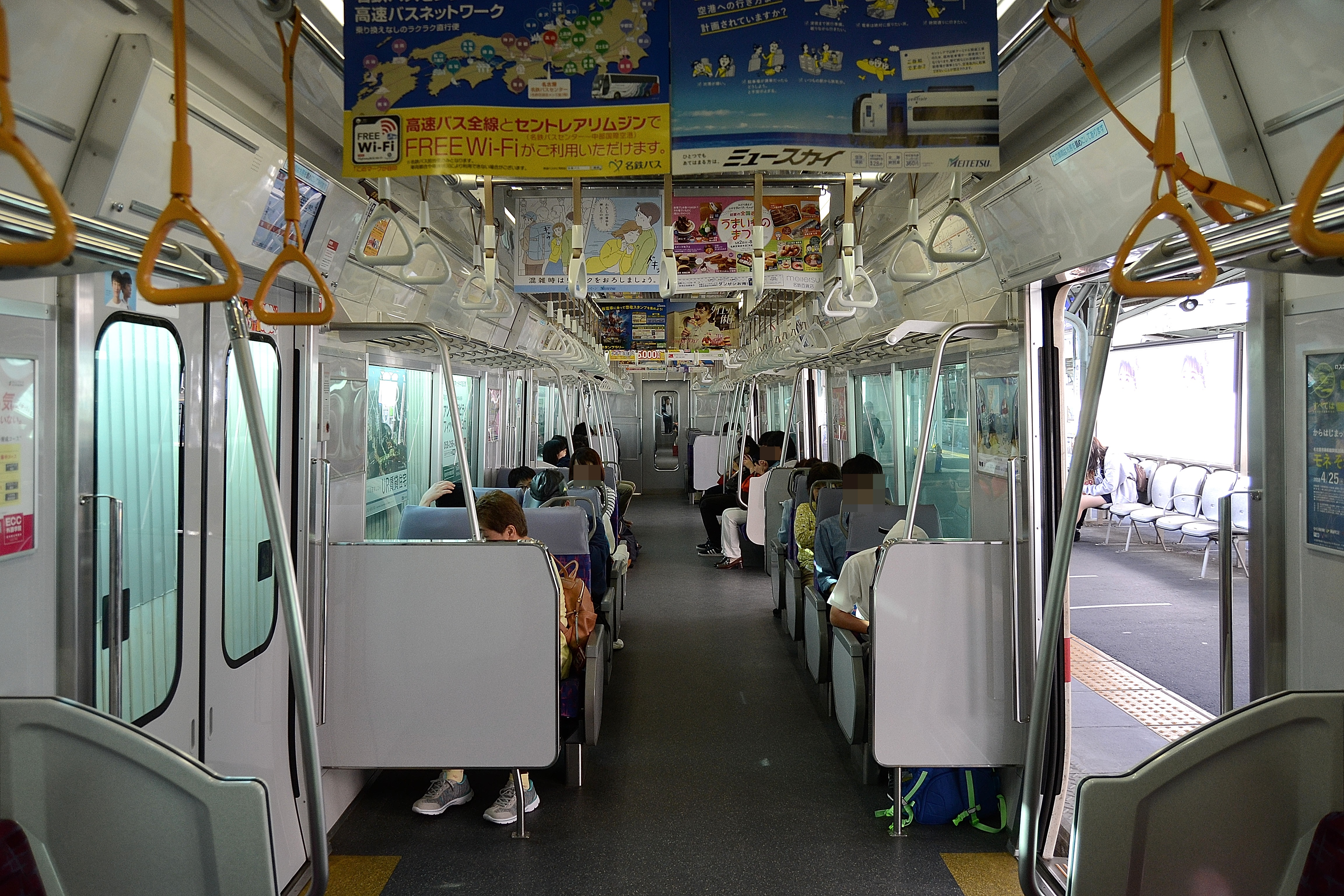
Interior of a 2300 series car

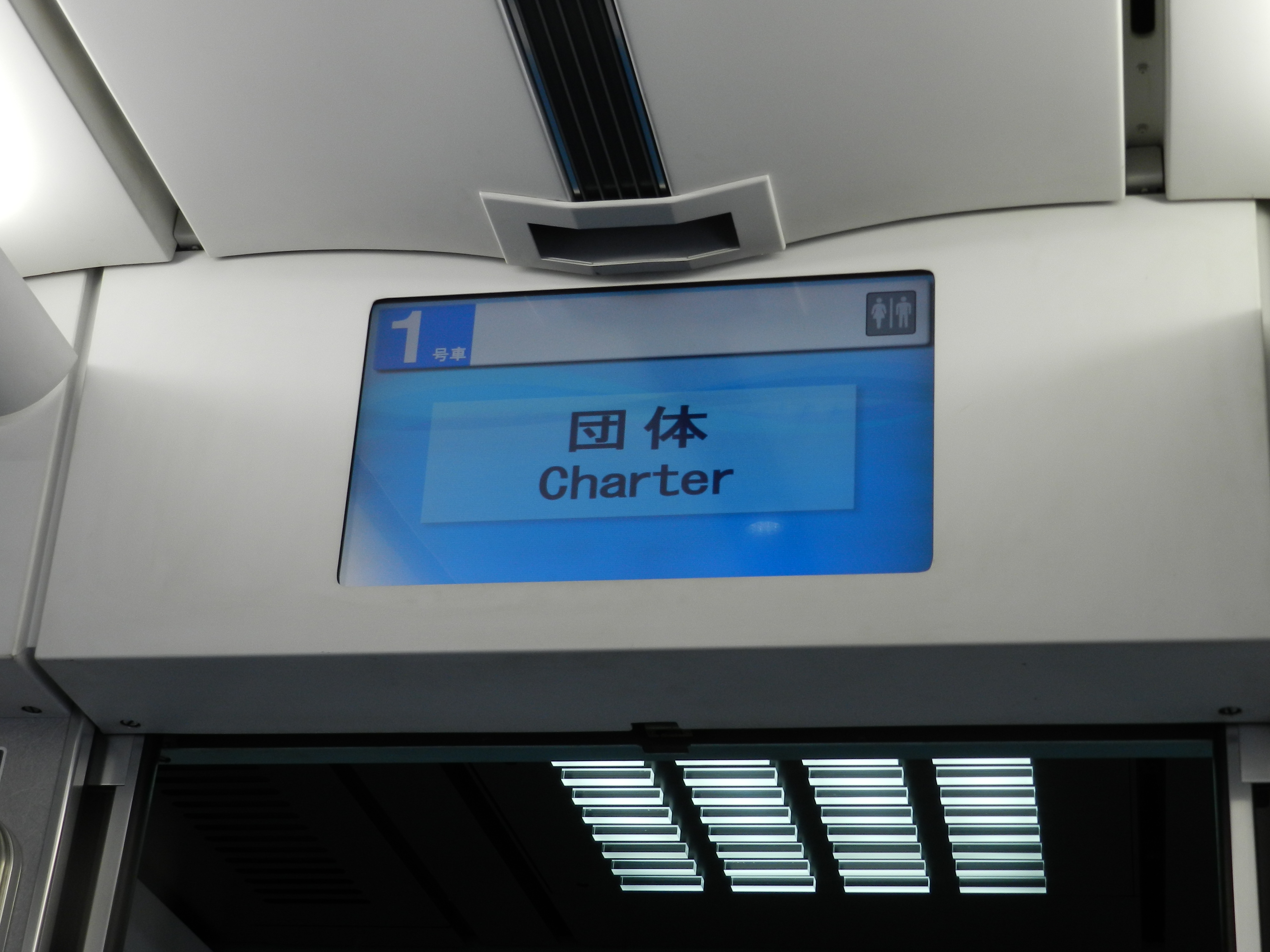
LCD passenger information display (2200 series)

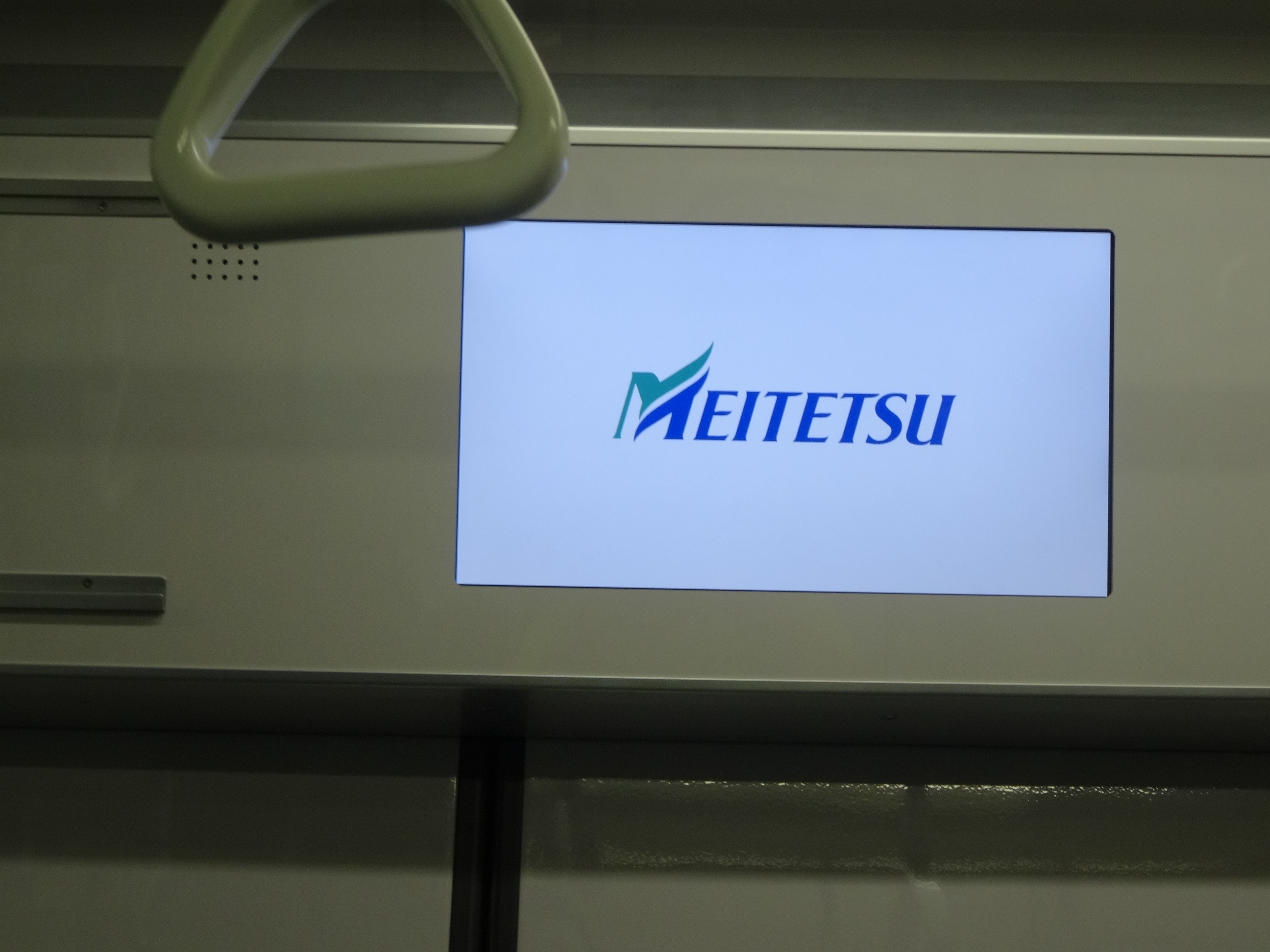
LCD passenger information display (2300 series)

== Gallery ==
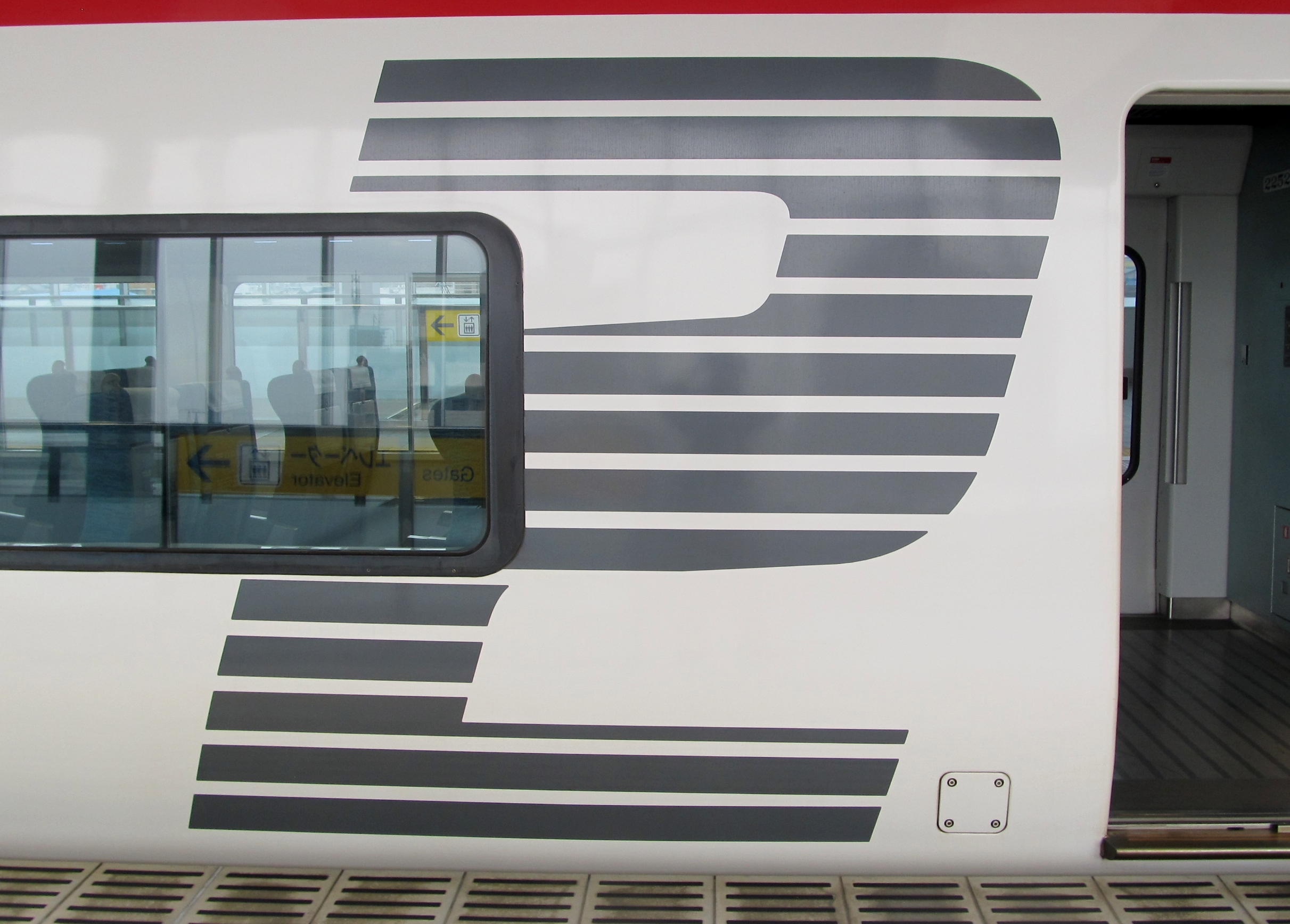
Car number decoration for limited express cars

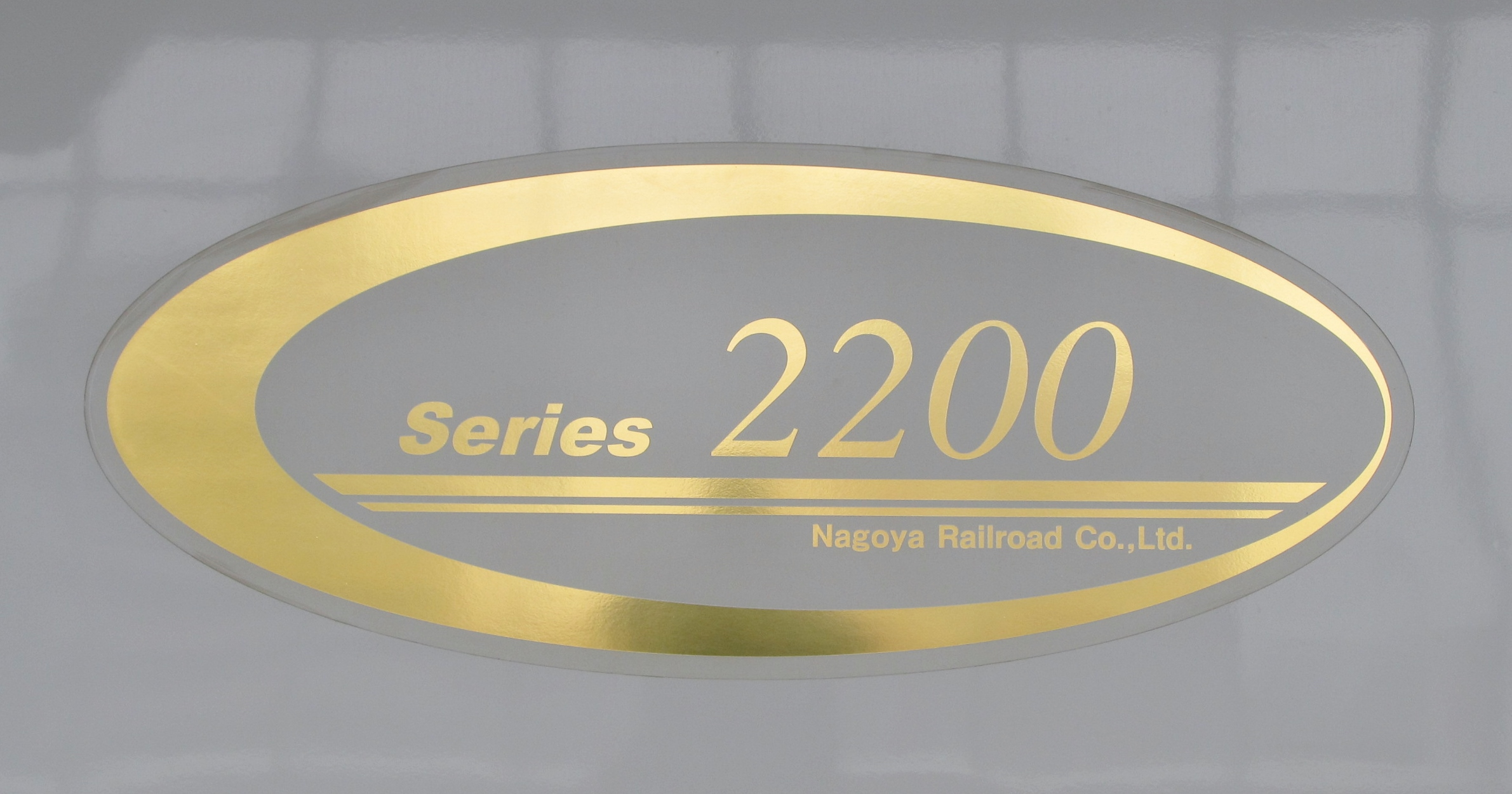
2200 series emblem

== History ==
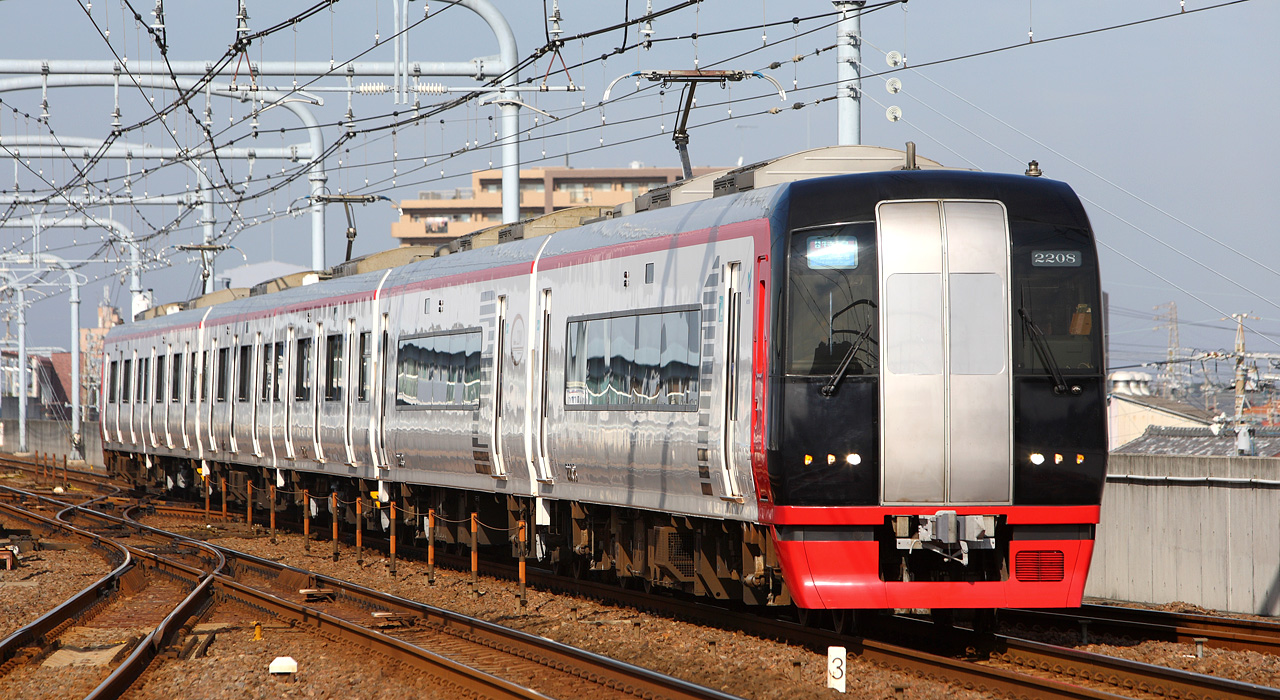
2200 series set 2208 in original livery, December 2008

The original fleet of nine 6-car trainsets was built from 2004, and consist of two limited express configuration cars based on the 2000 series EMUs together with four commuter configuration cars with three pairs of doors per side. The trains entered service from 29 January 2005.

Two more six-car sets were built in fiscal 2015.

Another six-car set, numbered 2212, was delivered in 2016.

Set 2213 was delivered in February 2019.

=== 2230 subseries ===
Following the withdrawal of the 1700 series, four additional six-car sets were formed from 2019. Numbered 2231 to 2234, these sets are formed of two newly built limited express cars and four 2300 series commuter-style cars that were originally part of 1700 series trainsets. The first 2230 subseries set to be formed, 2234, entered service in February 2020, using the 2300 series cars from 1700 series set 1704.
