= Legroom =

Legroom or leg room may refer to:

- The space reserved for legs in a stadium seating or theater seating
- The space in front of a car seat, like in a 2+2 car-body style
- Seat pitch in an airline seat
- The space in front of a train seat
