= Train seat =

Seat used in trains

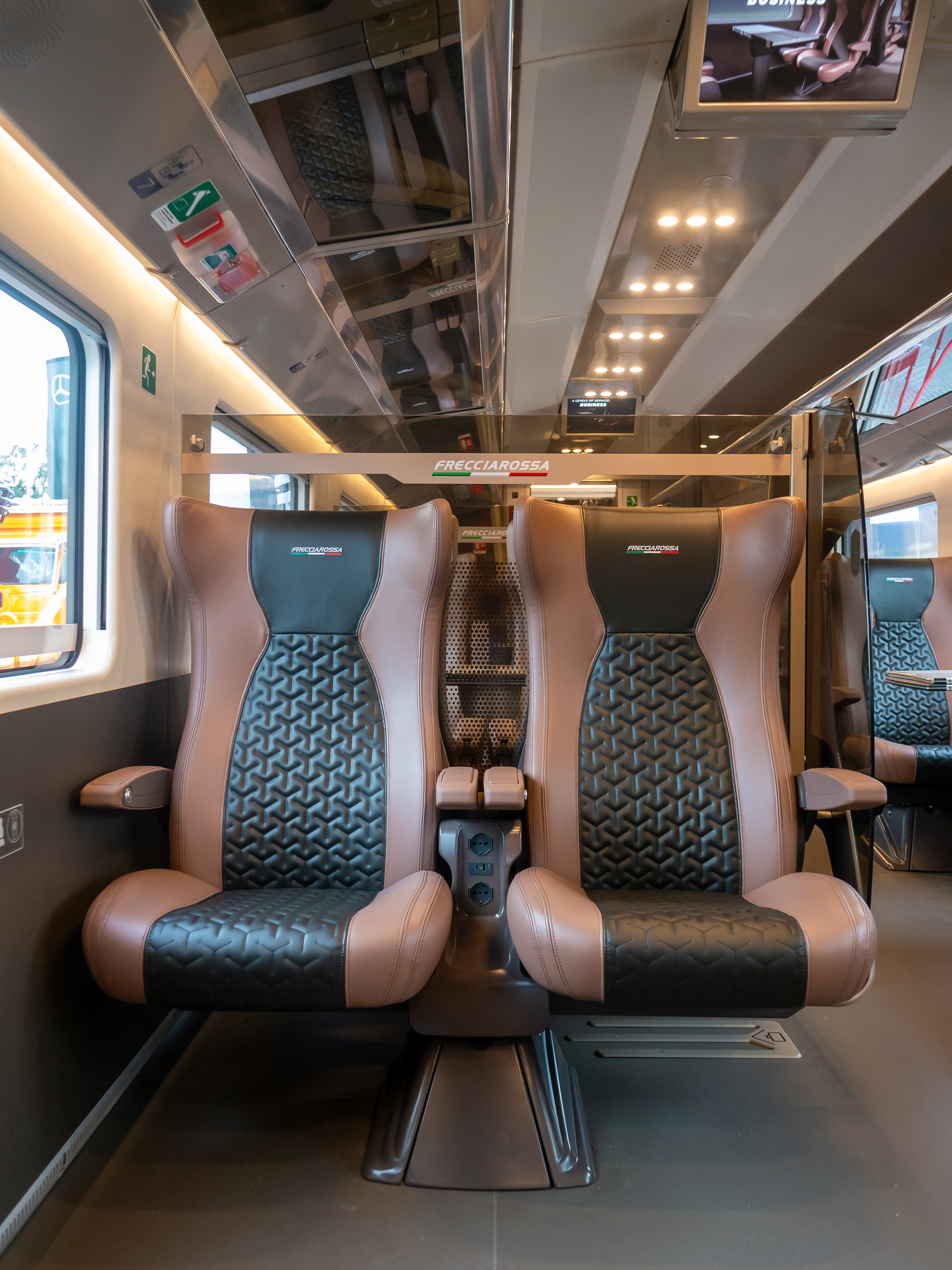
Business class seats on a Frecciarossa 1000 train at InnoTrans 2024 in Berlin, Germany.

A train seat is a seat used in a passenger train car allowing passengers to sit during their travels.

== Features and amenities ==
The seats generally have padding or are cushioned, providing a level of comfort to the passengers and distributing the sitting passengers' weight. The chairs are generally equipped with armrests and neck support at the height of the average passenger. Often, at the backs of the chairs, there are flip-down tables, magazine racks and waste containers for the use of the passenger behind them. More luxurious railroad coaches, like lounge cars, can provide recliners with special upholstery, with amenities like headphone connections, electronic visual displays and the like.

To best use the available space, jump seats are often installed, as they only take up space when passengers sit on them. When not in use, the space can be used for other items such as bicycles or strollers. These seats are generally installed near the doors, which means that at stops passengers who wish to continue using these seats will have to stand up to make room for passengers who want to leave the train.

== Seating layout ==
Train coaches have different seating layouts depending on factors such as passenger capacity and service type. These factors influence the type and placement of seating, aisles, and legroom space for passengers.

Corridor coaches contain several compartments with seating typically consisting of two sets of bench seats facing each other. The seats in an open coach are usually arranged in pairs with an aisle seat and a window seat, with the aisle seat closer to the centre aisle. Composite coaches feature both open seating and compartments.

Some seats that are close to the train doors are designated as priority seats for passengers with specific needs, such as pregnant women and the elderly. In first class coaches, individual seating arrangements generally provide increased legroom.

Seats are not necessarily facing the direction that the train is traveling as trains change direction. Often, sets of seats are arranged facing each other with a table in between.

=== Longitudinal seating (Long seats) ===
Long seats in a London Underground 1995 Stock. Long seats are common in many metro systems around the world.

Longitudinal seating, also known as long seats, refers to a layout in which bench seats are installed along the walls of a train carriage. This configuration provides greater standing room and total capacity, compared to many transverse seating arrangements.

Since this style of seating emphasizes transportation volume, it is generally used for rapid transit within cities, commuter rail services, and similar uses.

=== Transverse seating (Cross seats) ===
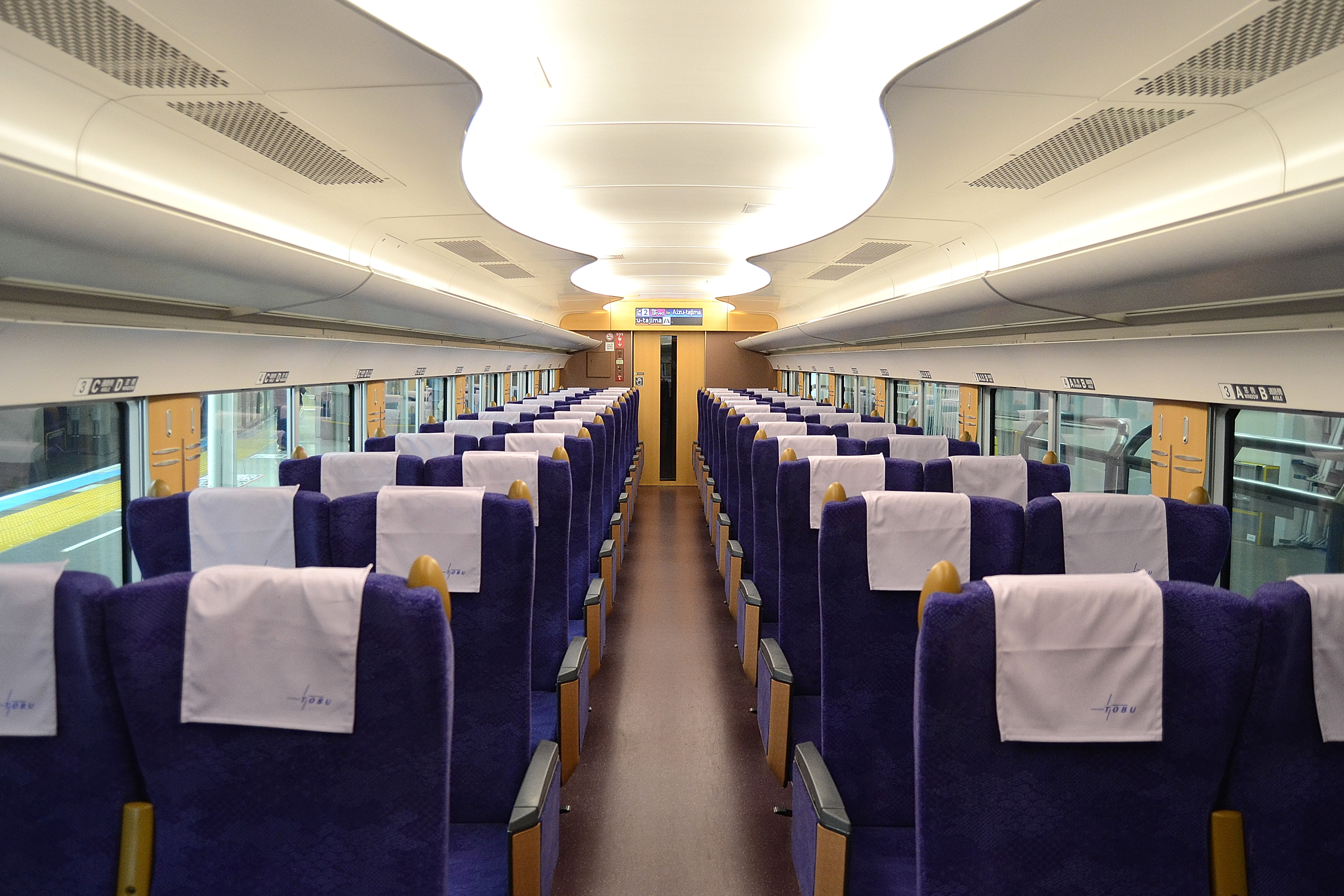
Rotating cross seats in a Tobu 500 series

Transverse seats, also known as cross seats, are oriented across the width of the carriage. Since this style emphasizes passenger comfort, it is often used for long-distance inter-city routes and high-speed rail services.

Transverse seats can be classified into fixed transverse seats, rotating transverse seats, and flip-over transverse seats. Fixed transverse seats include box seats and fixed unidirectional seats.

- Fixed transverse seats: These do not rotate and are the most basic form of transverse seat.
- Rotating transverse seats: These seats can be rotated to face different directions.
- Flip-over transverse seats: These switch direction by sliding the seatback forward or backward.

In some countries, such as Japan, the alignment of seat pitch and window placement is considered integral in cars with transverse seating. Designs must consider other factors, such as seat rotation and table deployment from the walls.

On services with a high number of tourists, transverse seating may be preferred over longitudinal seating because it generally provides more conventional seated accommodations. This creates a challenge in balancing tourism-oriented transport with regular commuting needs.

=== Gallery Car ===
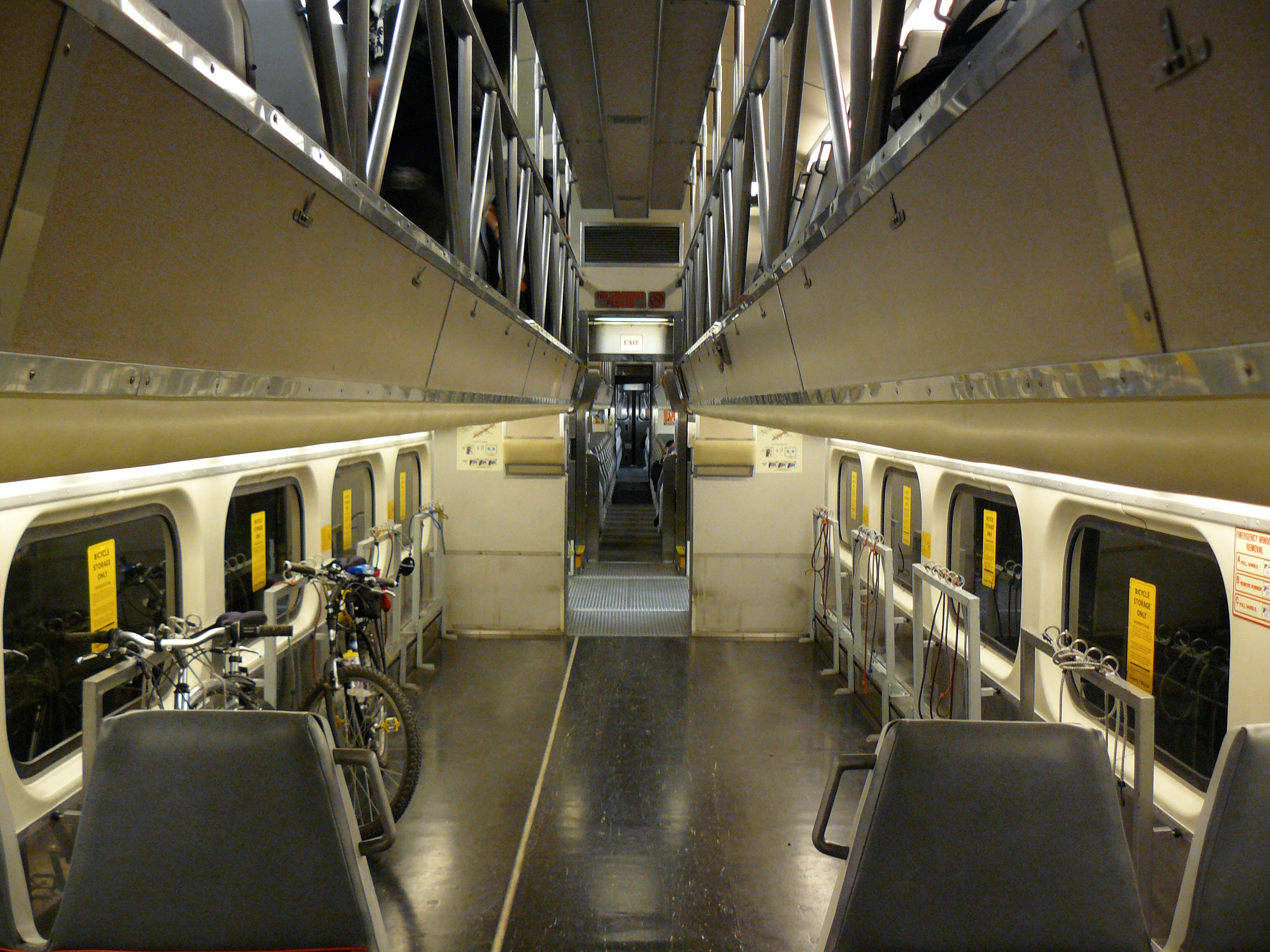
A Caltrain Bike Car.

In North American passenger rail, Gallery Cars are specialized bilevel rail cars. They are characterized by an aisle in the center flanked by transverse seating on the lower level, while the upper level features an open "gallery" immediately above the aisle on the lower level. This design allows conductors walking on the lower level to check tickets for passengers on the upper level, preventing fare evasion on short routes where conductors may not have sufficient time to traverse both the upper and lower decks of the carriage. The lower level seats are typically arranged in 2+2 transverse seating configuration, whereas the upper level features single transverse seats on either side of the gallery or longitudinal benches near stairwells.

== Priority seat ==
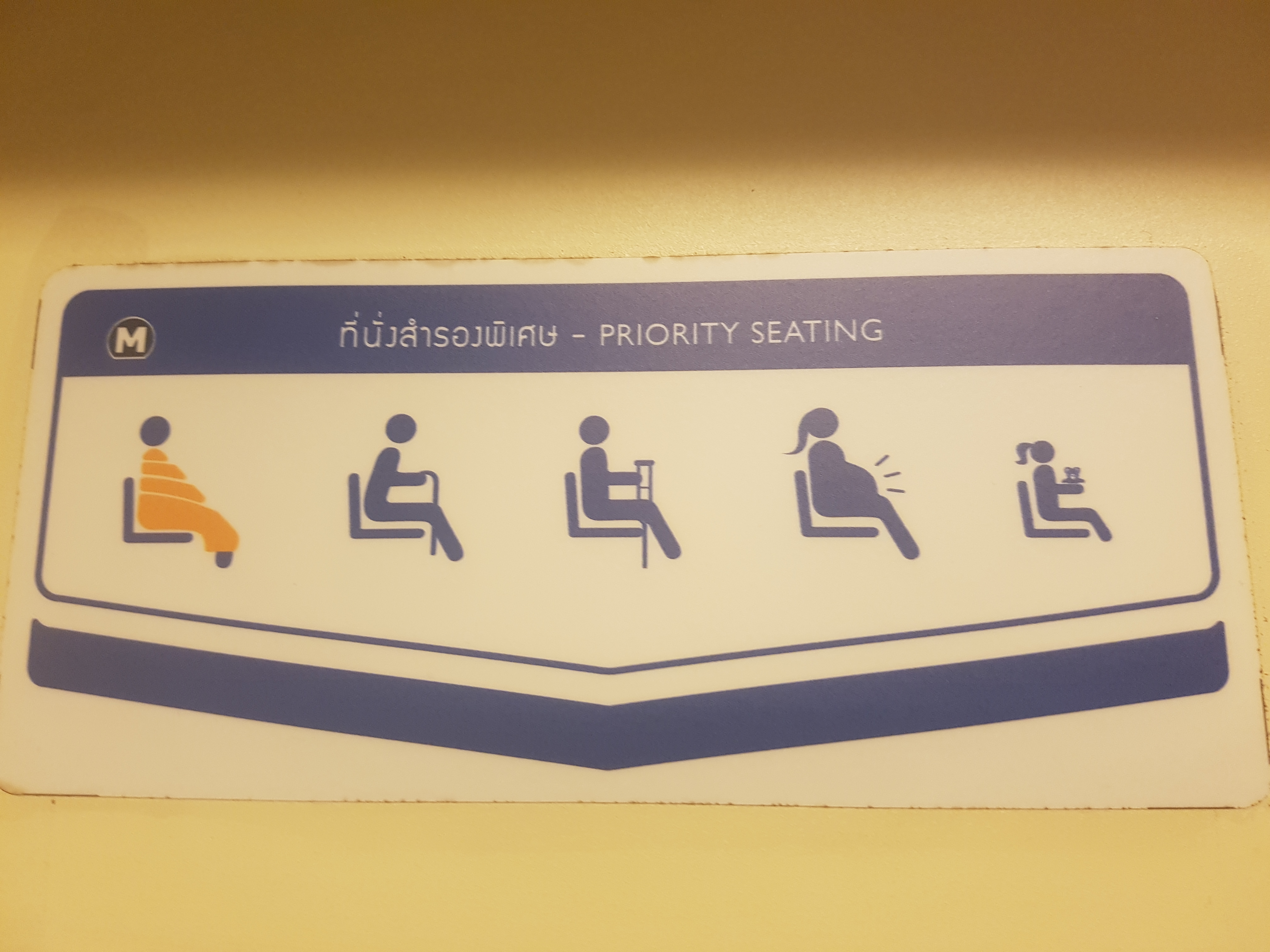
Priority seats in Thailand, where they are given to Buddhist monks, elderly persons, disabled persons, pregnant women, and children.

Priority seats refer to designated seats on public transportation systems such as trains and buses, where seating is prioritized for passengers with specific needs. These seats are installed for welfare purposes, primarily to accommodate transportation-vulnerable individuals such as the elderly, people with disabilities or injuries, pregnant women, and passengers with infants or strollers. In some countries, the seats are also designated for religious reasons. For example, in Thailand, priority seats are also given to Buddhist monks.

== Seating availability and communication ==
In most trains there is free or open seating. In some cases, one can make seat reservations, train seating plans or train seat maps are provided in computer reservation systems to allow future train passengers to select their seat, usually an aisle seat or window seat. On railway platforms passenger information systems generally display coach and seat numbers, allowing a passenger to more easily find their reserved seat in the train.

== Japan ==
This section mainly mentions open coach cars in Japan. For Japanese train seats for individual compartments, see ja:コンパートメント席 ("compartment seat"). For Japanese train beds, see ja:寝台車 (鉄道).

=== Materials ===
Historically, wooden seats were used on trains. Even today, certain sightseeing torokko trains (open observation cars) operating in various parts of Japan, such as the Sagano Scenic Railway and the Kurobe Gorge Railway, still use wooden seating.

Excluding the aforementioned torokko trains, the standard seating found on most Japanese trains, including metro, typically features cushions on the seat and backrest, which are covered with a type of fabric called moquette. In some trains, leather is used instead of fabric (e.g., JR Kyushu’s 885 series before the refurbishment, Green Cars of JR Hokkaido's KiHa 261).

In countries outside Japan, especially in metro / rapid transit designed for short-distance travel, it is common to find seats made of plastic or metal, which lack cushioning and are not covered with fabric. However, such seats are rarely seen on Japanese trains. The Osaka Municipal Subway 30 series introduced in 1973 were a rare example, featuring seats made with an FRP frame filled with polyurethane foam and covered in vinyl leather. However, especially during the summer months, the combination of the non-air-conditioned cars and the vinyl leather caused the seats to become slippery or sticky with sweat, drawing strong criticism from passengers. As a result, the seats were later replaced with more conventional moquette-covered ones.

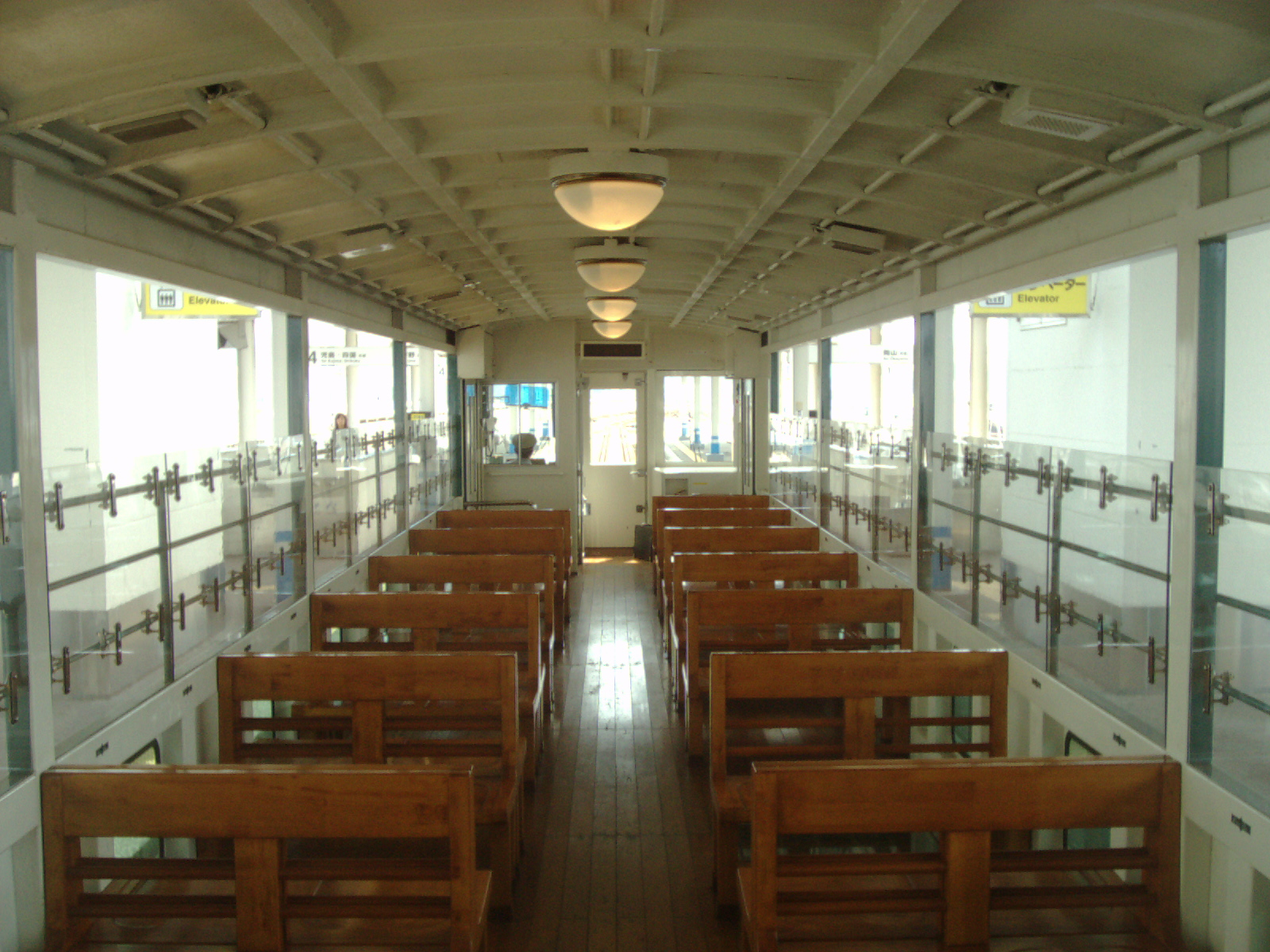
Wood seats, JR Shikoku Seto-Ōhashi Torokko train.

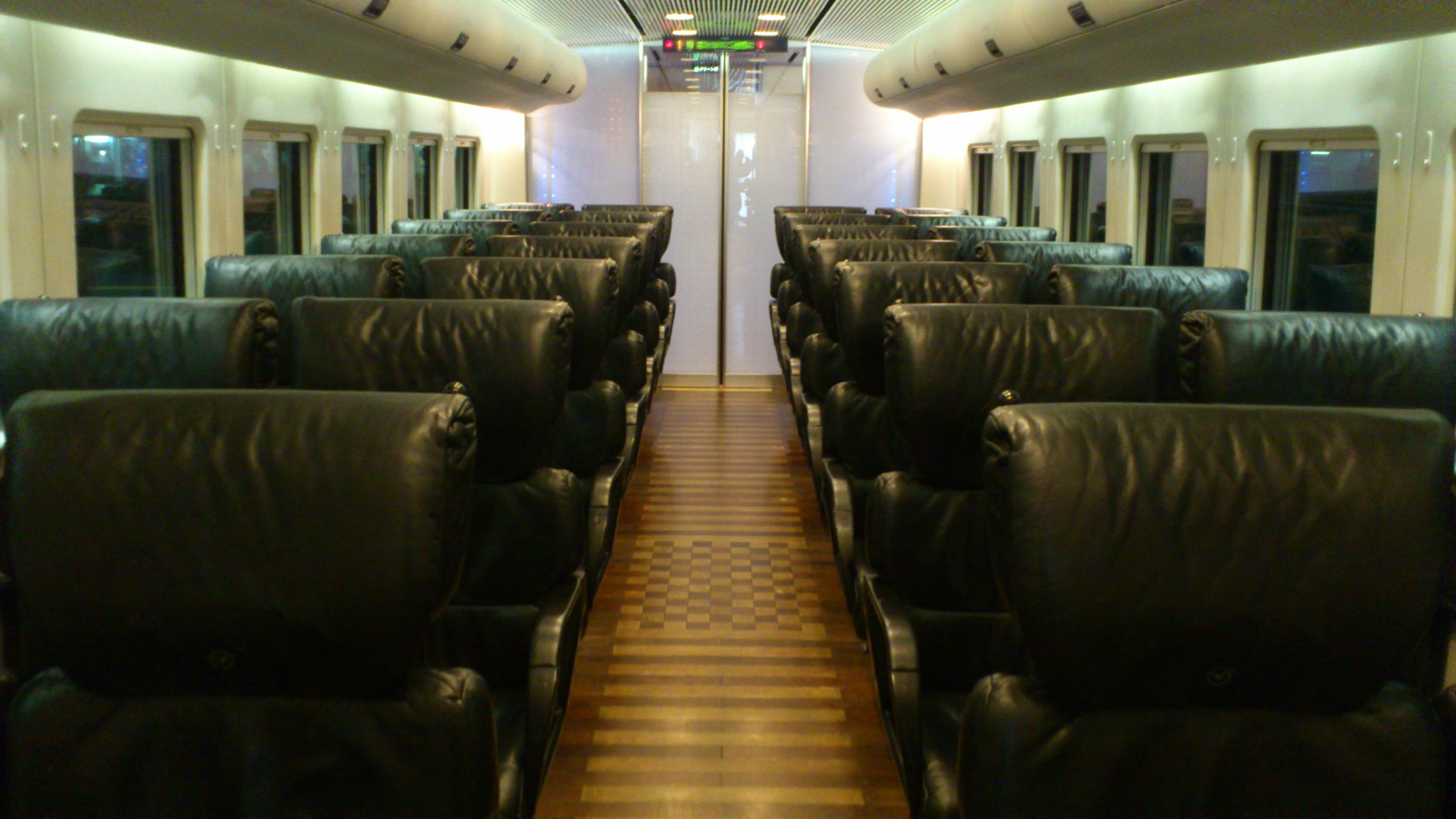
Leather seats, JR Kyushu 885 series.

=== Long seats ===
On highly congested routes, priority is given to passenger capacity and ease of boarding rather than seated comfort, so long seats (ロングシート, rongu shīto) are commonly adopted. These are found in commuter, suburban, and general-purpose trains of Japan National Railways (JNR) and its successor Japan Railways Group (JR), as well as private railways. Many trains have been converted from cross-seated cars (a downgrade in classification), or shifted to long seats during additional production phases (e.g., Meitetsu 6000 series, JR Kyushu 817 series, JR Central KiHa 25). In some cases, such as local trains on the Tōkaidō Main Line in the Shizuoka area, long seats are intentionally used due to the short riding time.

However, this layout is less suited for long journeys due to structural limitations: poor window view, low backrests due to window frame height, and difficulty in reclining. Therefore, it is not favorably received for less crowded periods or mid-to-long-distance travel. Since the 1990s, some operators, such as JR Shikoku, have ceased manufacturing all-long seat cars, citing competition not just with other railways but with private cars and buses.

Since the late 2000s, improved comfort features have appeared, such as high-back and headrest-equipped long seats. These are found in dual-seat cars (discussed later), the refurbished Keihan 8000 series (end sections), and Tokyu 2020 series.

Historically, the extra floor space in front of long seats made them suitable for premium classes (first and second class) of Japanese trains in the early 20th century. In the Taishō era, most premium cars on Japanese Government Railways used long seat layouts. With the wider car bodies introduced in the Shōwa era, box and flip-over cross seats with wider seat pitch became mainstream. However, even as late as the 1930s, luxury observation cars like SuITe 37049 and 37050 used long sofa-style seats. Still, a few special salon-style cars have adopted long sofas (e.g., the Oykot sightseeing train), but such cars are very costly. Most premium seating is now cross-seated, which allows privacy and high backrests without compromising window size. Long seats remain prevalent in commuter/metro and suburban trains. In some cases, large tables are installed over aisle areas to convert the cars into event trains. This low-cost solution is also found on local lines and trams.

Some cars, such as JR East KiHa 100/110, Izukyu 2100 series, Eizan Electric Railway 900 series Kirara, have long seats facing windows to enhance scenic views for tourists. These usually seat 1–2 people and often use high-backrests. In recent years, such seats have even been sold as paid reserved seating on trains like the Nankai's Tenkū and JR Kyushu's Ibusuki no Tamatebako.

Outside of tourist trains, long seats facing the windows can also be found on Tokyo Monorail trains. In this case, due to structural constraints of the Alweg-type monorail, the center part of the car is raised, and seats are installed in that elevated area.

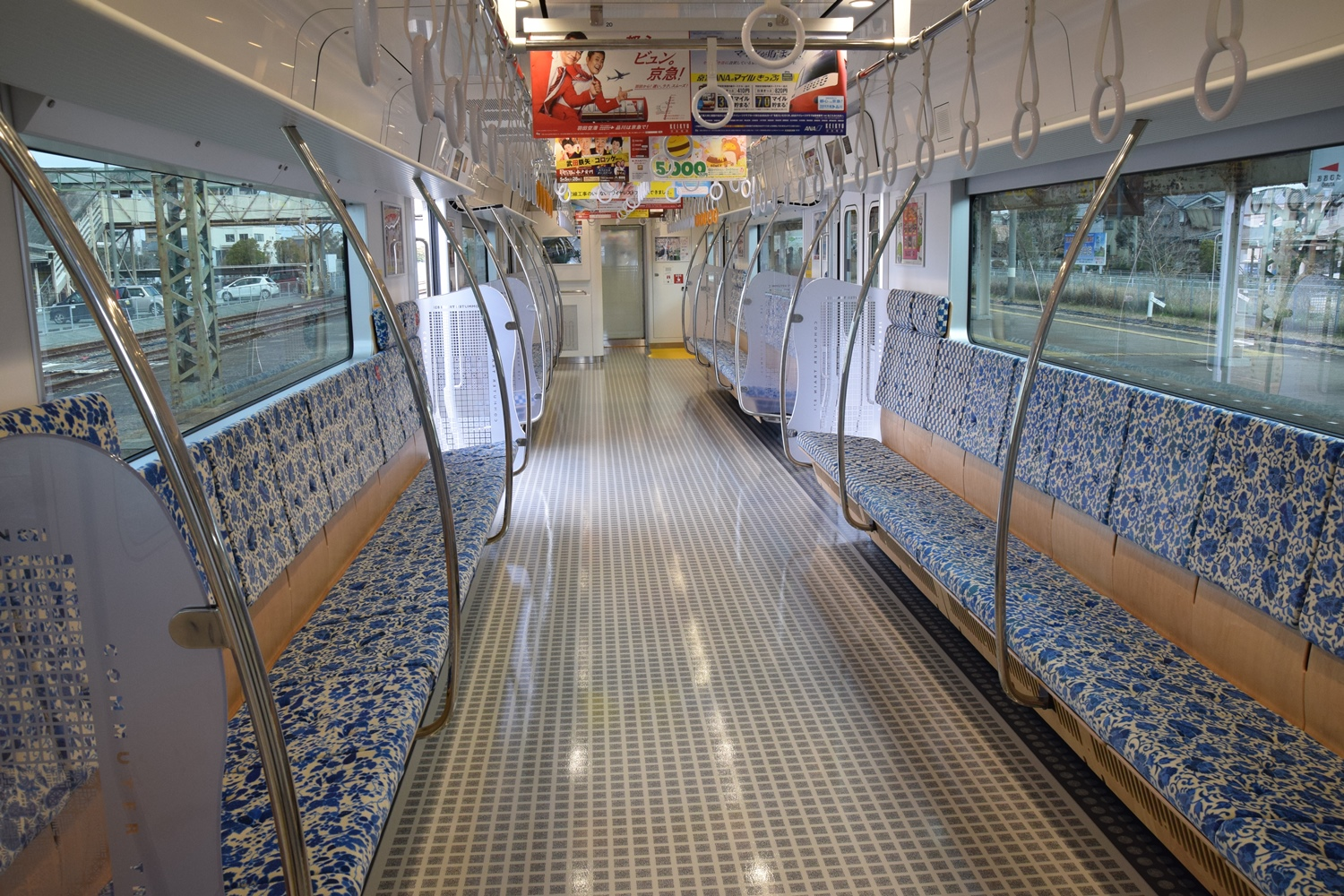
High-back and headrest-equipped long seats, JR Kyushu 821 series.

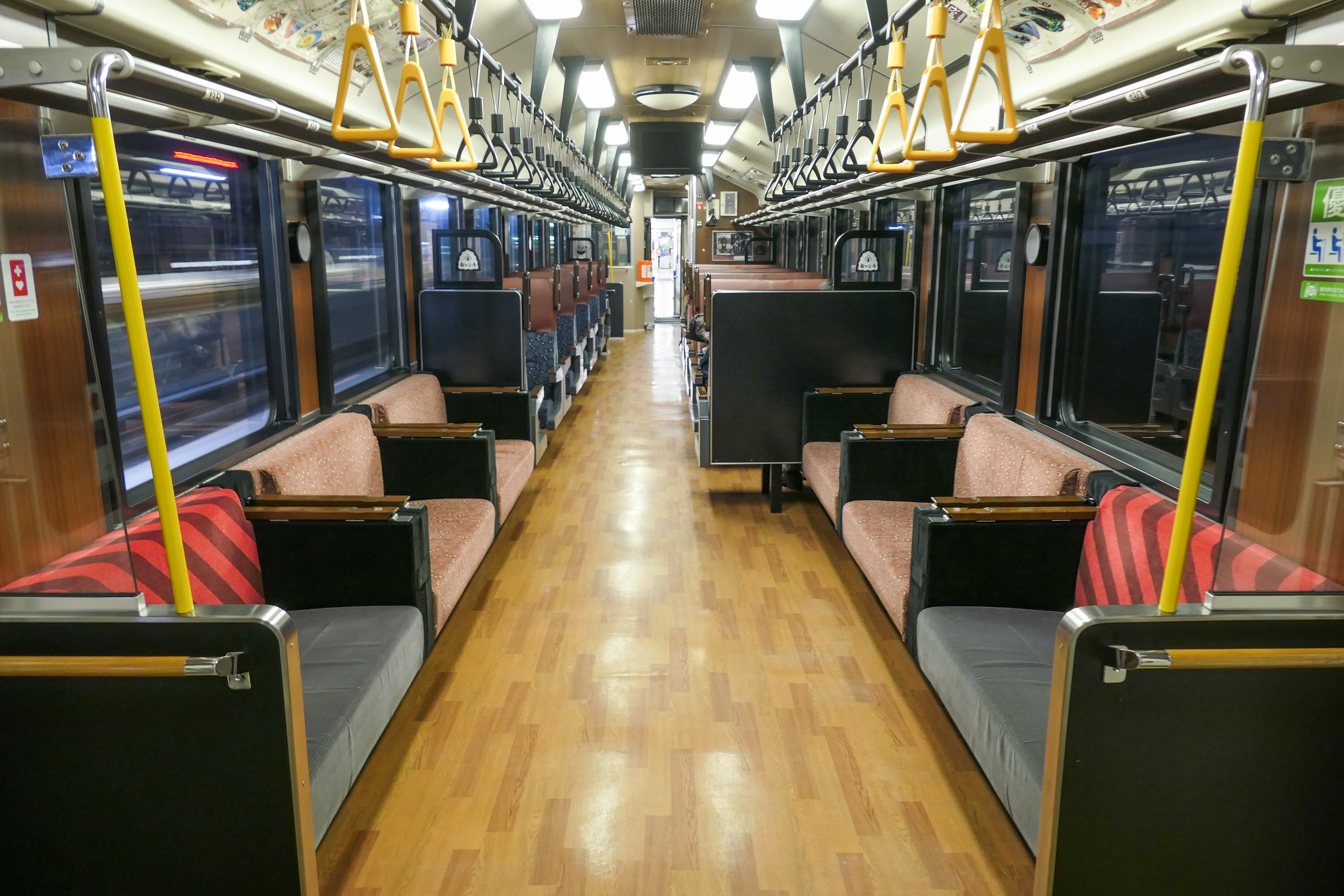
Semi-cross seating with sofa-style long seats, KiHa 110 Oykot train.

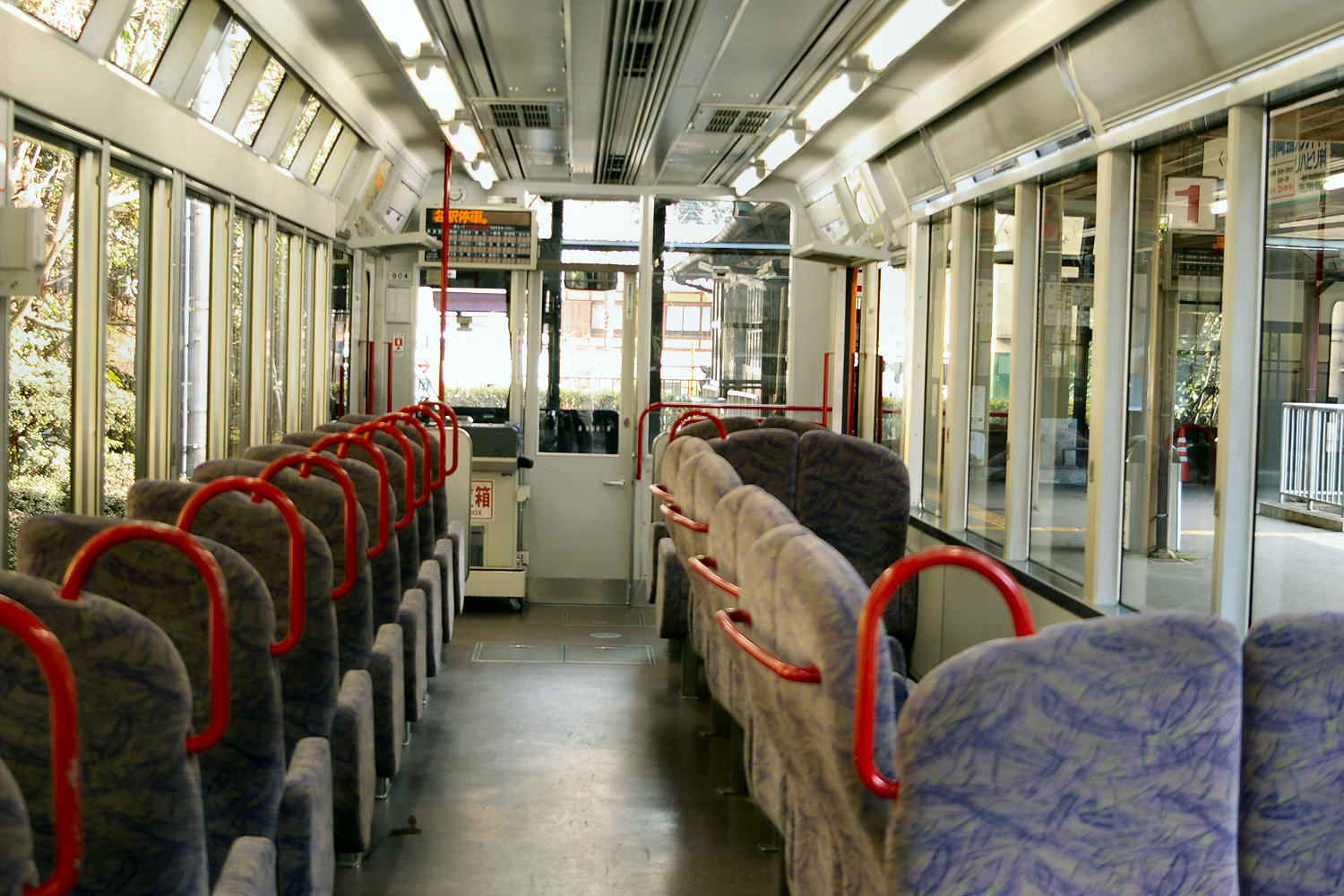
Semi-cross seating with long seats on one side facing windows, Eizan Electric Railway 900 series Kirara.

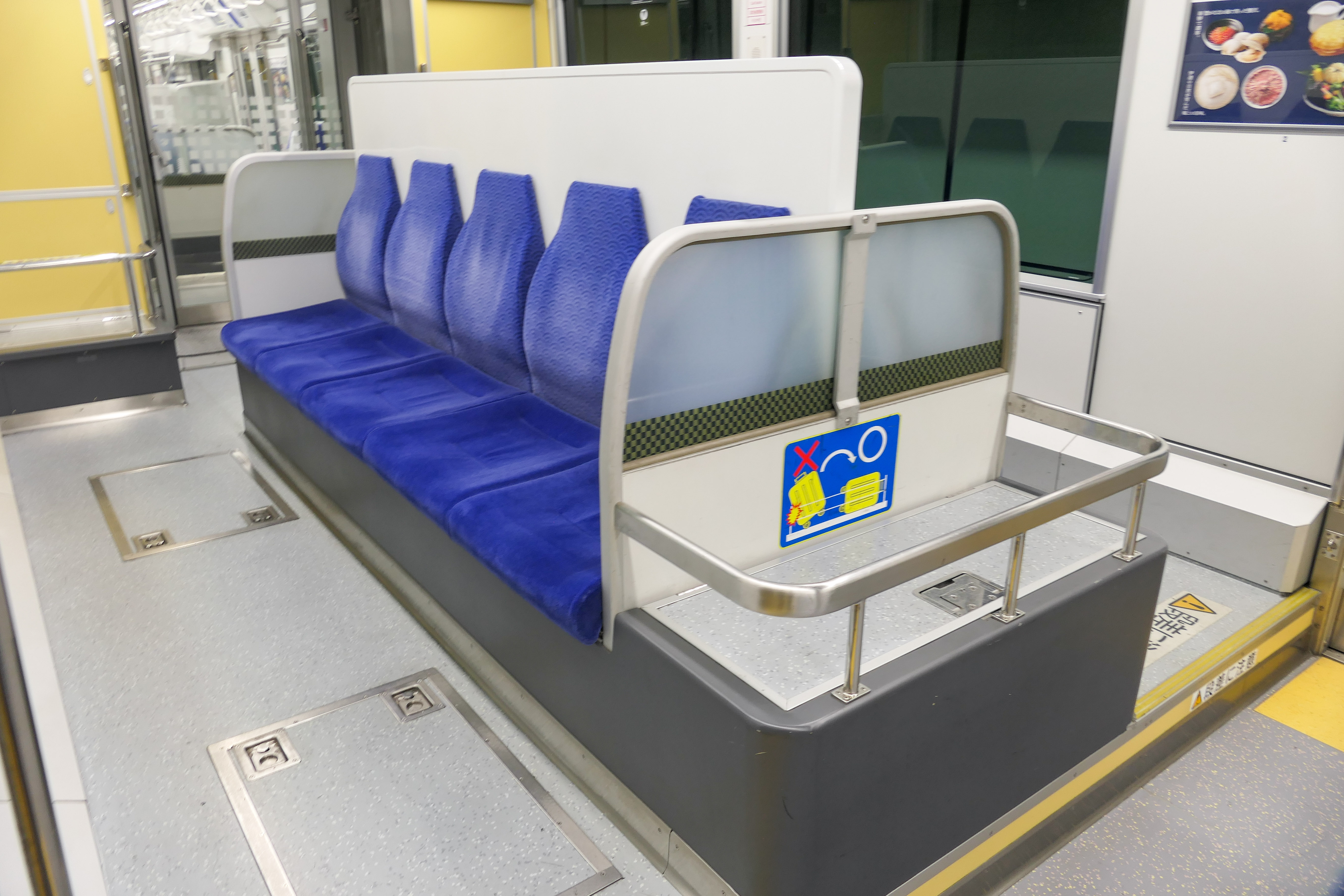
Semi-cross seating with long seats placed on center, facing both sides of windows. Tokyo Monorail 10000 series.

==== Long seat designs ====
On cars with long seats, some passengers may occupy the space of two seats. To combat such behavior and enhance comfort and safety during accidents, new seating innovations have been introduced.

- Color coding

A psychological strategy involves changing the color of parts of the seat upholstery to subtly guide passenger behavior. This was first used on JNR 201 series, where the center seat in a 7-seat row had a different fabric color. Later, Chiba New Town Railway 9000 series used color distinctions between 2-seat and 4-seat sections. Patterns that define individual seating positions have also been woven into fabrics (e.g., Osaka Metro 20 series).

- Seat division

Traditionally, long seats were installed in one piece or split into two segments (e.g., 4+4 or 4+3). Newer models divide seating into even smaller units for better clarity of capacity. Hokusō Railway 7000 series, for example, divides seats every two persons. JR Kyushu 815, 303, and SaHa 813-500 feature individual seat cushions for each person.

- Bucket seats

These seats have contours shaped to match body shapes, guiding proper seating and improving comfort. The effectiveness of the design varies by operator. Since the 1980s (e.g., JNR 211 series), their usage has increased. In contrast, some Asian metro systems use molded plastic or metal benches. Japan has seen similar adoption in Osaka Municipal Subway 30 series (later converted to normal seats) and Meitetsu Mo 880.

- Dividers

Some cars use vertical poles or panels to divide the seats or add high side panels in front of the doors. The latter is often a safety measure post-Amagasaki derailment (2005). Dividers are more effective than color coding or bucket shaping for clearly defining seating areas. For example, 7-seat rows often use two dividers in a 2+3+2 layout. The trend started with Tokyu 9000 series in 1986 and has grown since the late 1990s. Dividers that double as grab poles became standard in cars manufactured after Japan's barrier-free transport law (ja:交通バリアフリー法) came into effect.

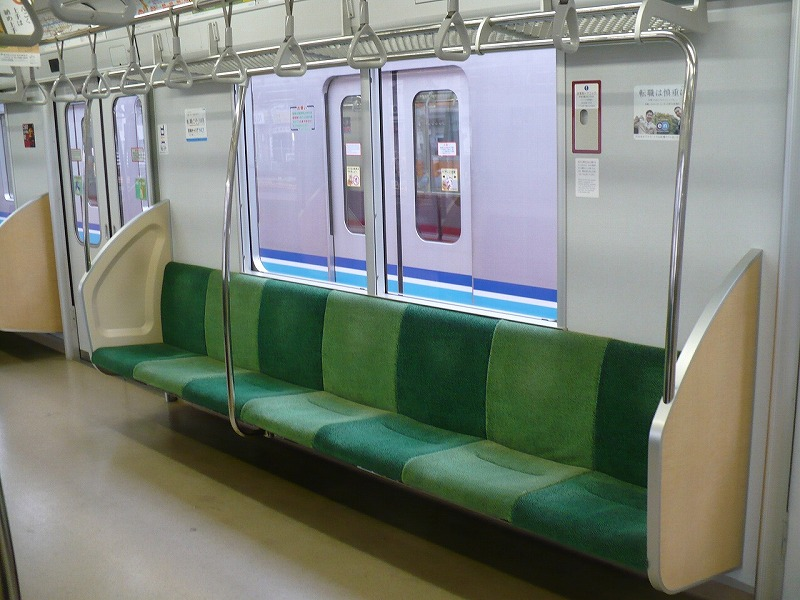
Color coded seats, Toyo Rapid Railway 2000 series.

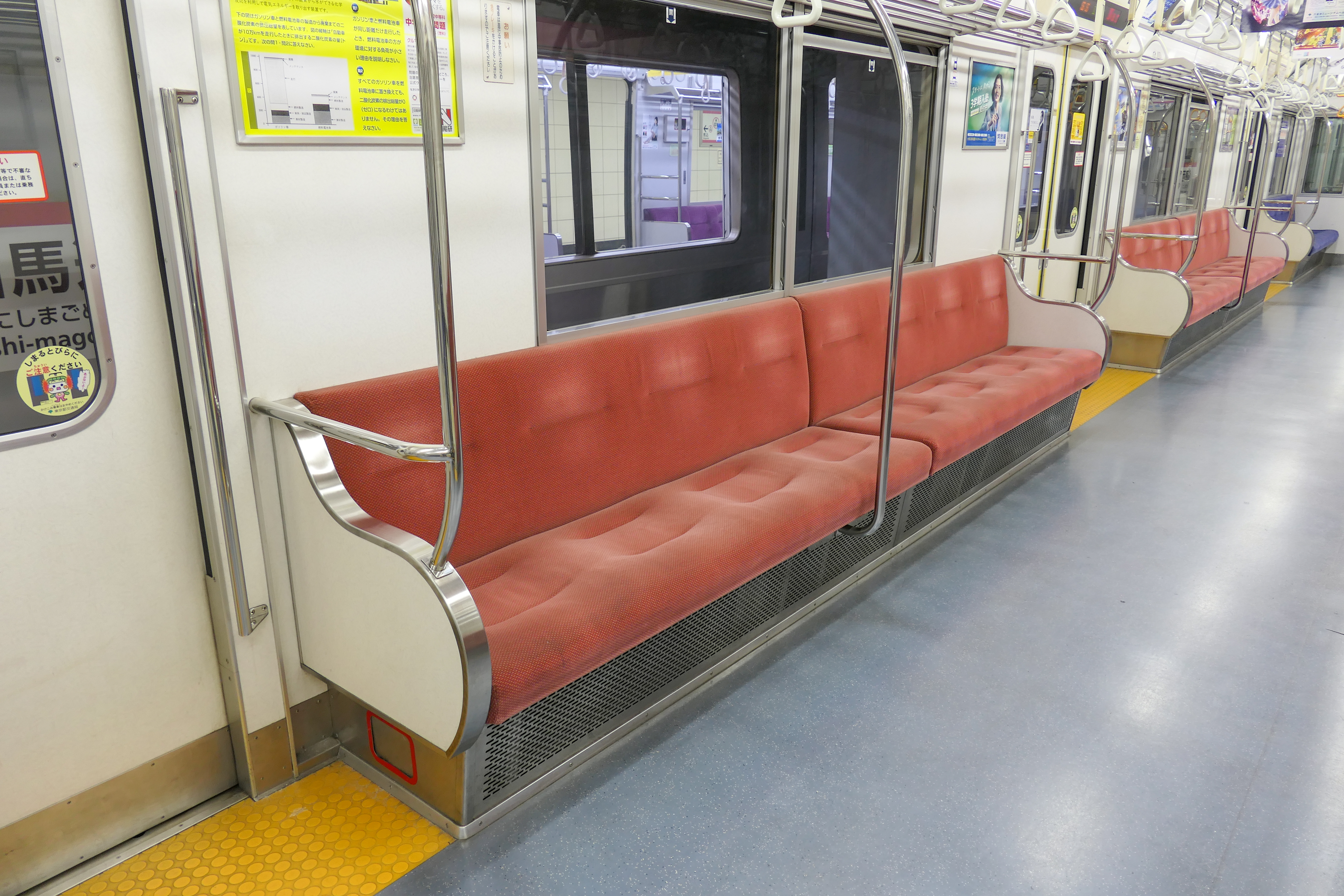
Bucket seats, Toei Subway 5300 series.

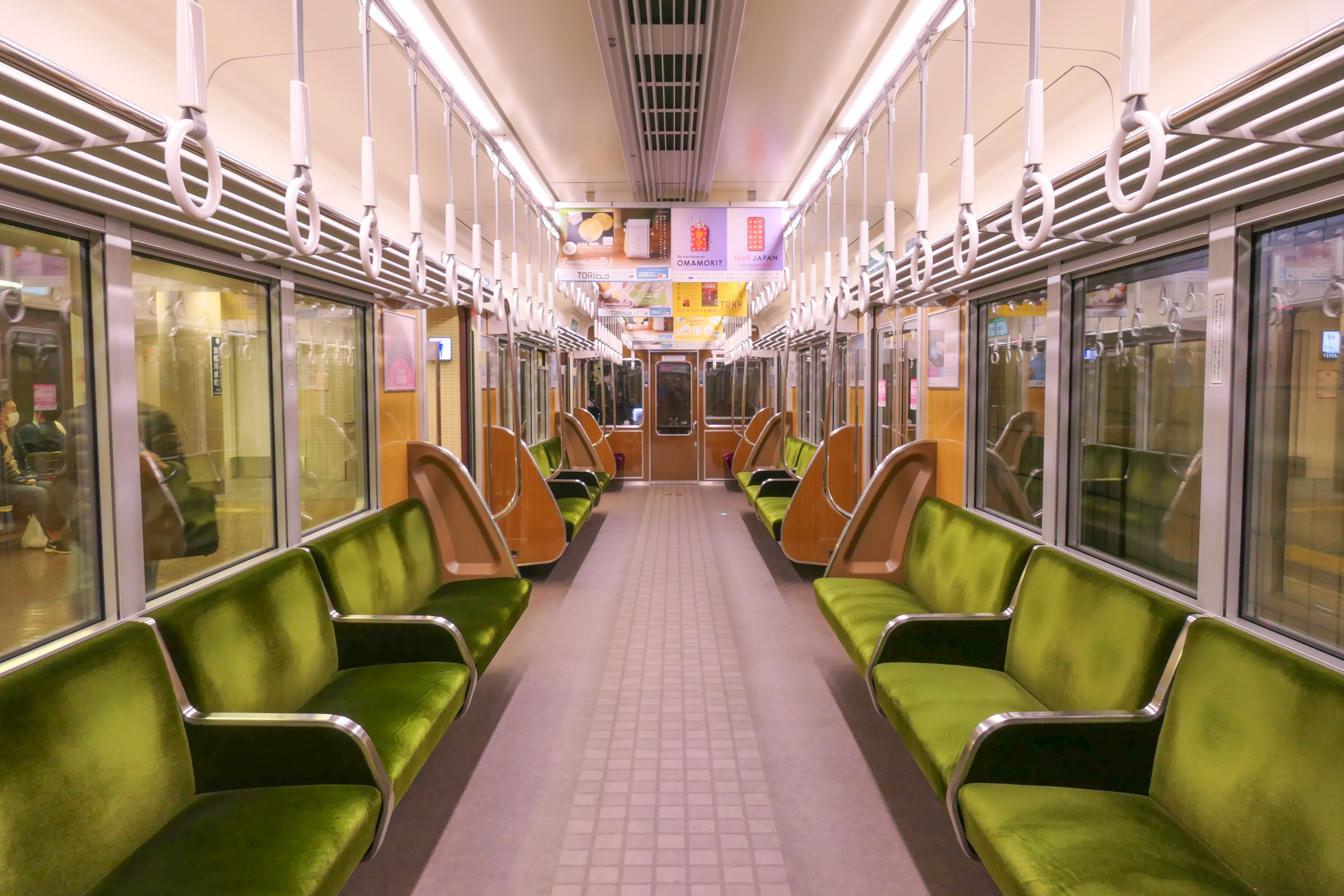
Seats with dividers. Hankyu 1300 series (2nd gen).

==== Seat capacity and dimensions ====
Previously, the Ordinary Railway Structural Regulation (ja:普通鉄道構造規則), abolished in 2002, mandated that seats account for at least one-third of the car capacity, with a minimum seat width of 400 mm per person. During the JNR era, the standard was about 430 mm. Although the rule was removed with the introduction of JR East 6-door cars, most post-2000 vehicles still adhere to similar standards. Seat width per person has increased with the average body size of Japanese passengers. Newer train models now offer widths of approximately 450 to 480 mm.

=== Cross seats ===
Cross seats (クロスシート, kurosu shīto) are commonly adopted in suburban-type EMUs and general DMUs operated by JNR/JR, as well as in limited express-type trains of major private railways and in local private railways. In regions like Kansai and Tōkai, where railway company competition has historically been intense, flip-over cross seats are frequently used, especially in intercity trains such as JR's New Rapid and the through service limited express trains of Hanshin and Sanyo Electric Railways. In contrast, in Kantō region, cross seats are used in vehicles intended for mid-distance intercity and leisure travel, such as the Tobu 6050 series on the Tobu Isesaki/Nikko Lines, the Keikyu 2100 series primarily used on Rapid Limited Express trains operating from Sengakuji/Shinagawa, and the Seibu 4000 series running on the Seibu Ikebukuro/Chichibu Lines. However, due to the higher congestion rates compared to the Kansai and Tōkai regions, cross seats are rarely used in non-reserved seating cars in the Kantō region. This is due to factors such as the difficulty of boarding and alighting compared to long seats, which can cause delays during rush hours, the limited standing space, and recent trends where passengers prefer not to sit directly beside or face strangers in confined spaces. Nevertheless, with the enactment of New Barrier-free Act (ja:バリアフリー新法) and a growing demand for improved mobility, the desire for cross seats has not entirely disappeared. Some newer vehicles adopt cross seats only at the ends of cars.

Due to their structural design, funiculars always use cross seats.

==== Rotating cross seats ====
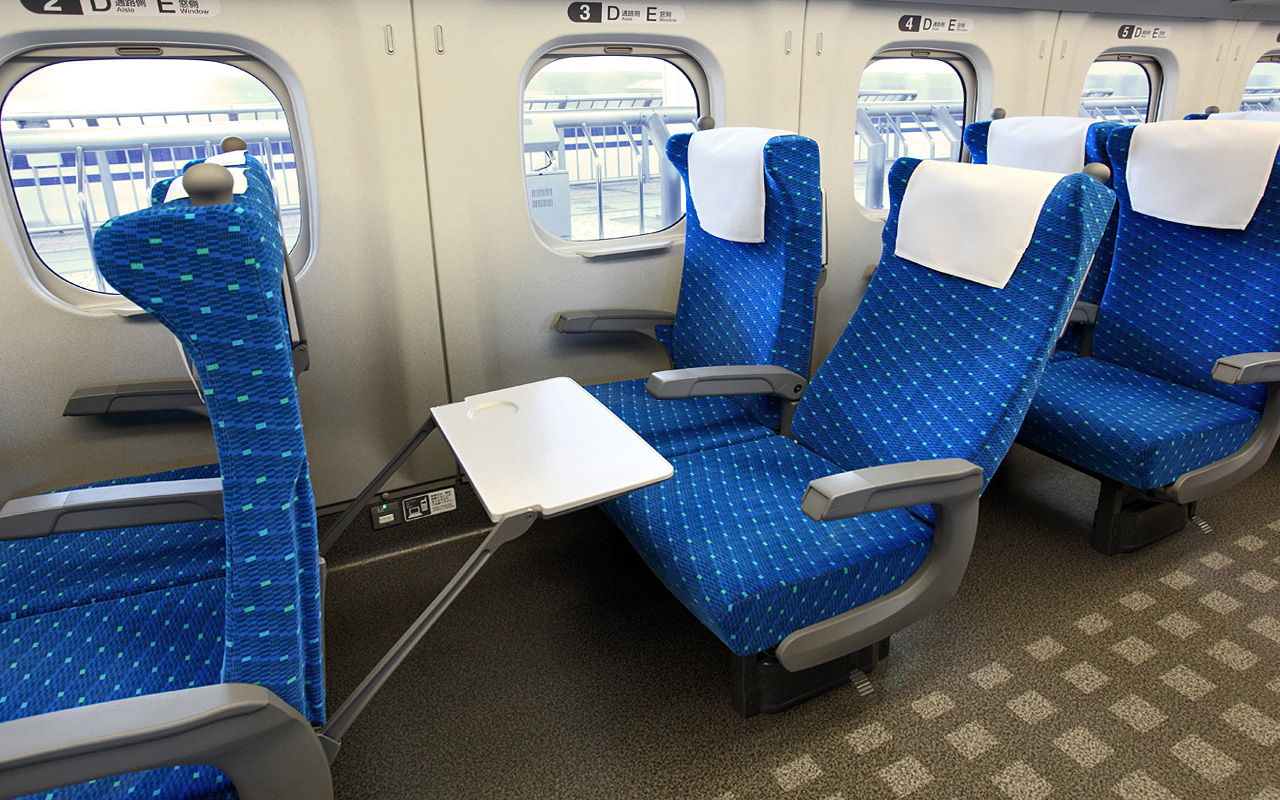
Rotating cross seats, JR Central N700 series Shinkansen.

Rotating cross seats (回転式クロスシート, kaiten-shiki kurosu shīto), mainly used in limited express trains that require an additional fare, rotate 180 degrees around a vertical axis fixed to the floor, allowing passengers to always face the direction of travel. They can also be rotated to face other seats for group use. In sightseeing trains and Joyful Trains (chartered/group-use trains), some seats can rotate 45 or 90 degrees to face seats across the aisle or be fixed toward the window. These seats may come equipped with tray tables, small storage spaces, footrests, or fold-out tables embedded in armrests. In the days when smoking was allowed, ashtrays were also included. The standard seat pitch in JNR-era vehicles was 970 mm for suburban-type Green Cars, and 910 mm or 940 mm for ordinary-class seats in limited express trains (e.g., JR Hokkaido KiHa 183, JR Shikoku/JR Kyushu KiHa 185).

In the 1950s–1960s, non-reclining rotating cross seats were used in standard-class cars of limited express trains, second-class cars of semi-express trains (later first-class), and Green Cars of suburban-type trains. Most current rotating cross seats now feature reclining functions. Among the vehicles used in limited express trains, those without reclining functions include the Tobu 300 series and non-reserved upper-deck seats of the JR East E4 series Shinkansen Max. There are also "dual seats" (discussed later) that can only rotate when used in cross seat mode.

==== Flip-over cross seats ====
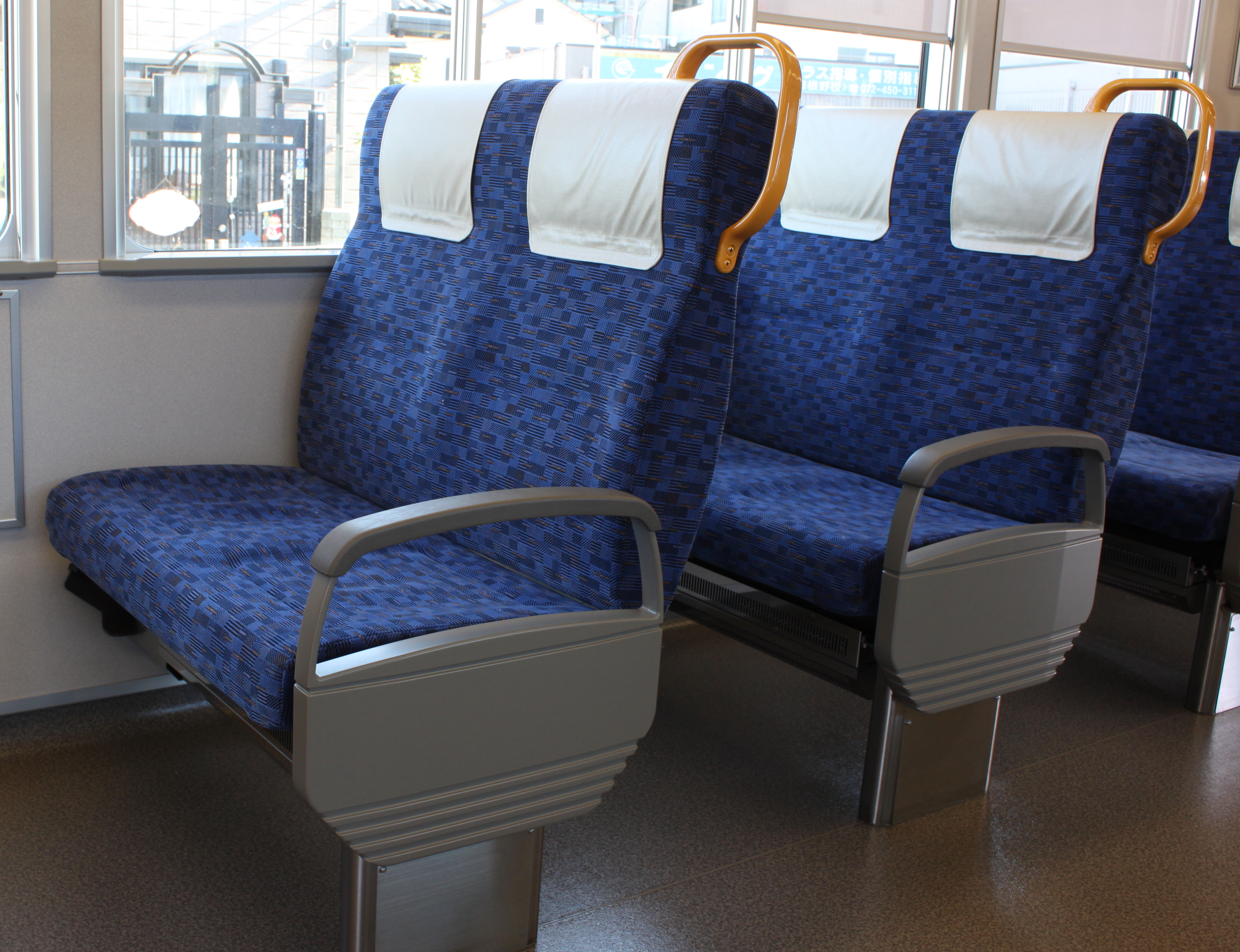
Flip-over cross seats, JR West 225-5000 series.

Flip-over cross seats (転換式クロスシート, tenkan-shiki kurosu shīto) allow the direction of the backrest to be flipped front-to-back, changing the seat's orientation. They are especially common in vehicles operating in the highly competitive Tōkai and Kansai regions, but are less common in Kantō and Tōhoku regions. Examples of their use in limited express-type vehicles include the 0 Series Shinkansen, the 185 series, and the KiHa 185 (only the Kiroha 186 cars), and they have also been introduced as part of seat upgrades in older models like the KiHa 80 and KiHa 58.

With a relatively simple mechanism, flip-over seats allow passengers to face the direction of travel or face each other, similar to rotating seats. Some versions include a split backrest design for improved posture. Until the 1960s, these seats were widely used in second-class and express cars that required an extra fare. However, compared to rotating seats, they were less comfortable, could not accommodate built-in equipment on the backrest, and typically lacked a reclining function. As a result, rotating seats became the standard for higher-end services. Instead, since the late 1980s, flip-over cross seats have seen increased use in regular, non-reserved fare cars operated by JR passenger companies (excluding JR East) and some private railways, including in non-premium express and rapid trains. Seat pitch is typically 910 mm for JNR/JR cars and 900 mm for private railways, though adjustments are made as needed. Even in cars classified as flip-over cross seat vehicles, suburban or private limited express trains often feature fixed-angle seats at the ends of cars or near doors, designed to match the tilt of the flip-over seats. This approach reduces dead space behind seatbacks, helping to maintain passenger capacity.

Some vehicles are equipped with automatic seat-flipping mechanisms controlled by the conductor at terminal stations. Among them, the Keikyu 2100 series trains are designed with narrower seat pitch assuming no face-to-face usage, and seats are fixed facing forward during operation, meaning passengers cannot manually flip them.

==== Fixed cross seats ====
- Box seats

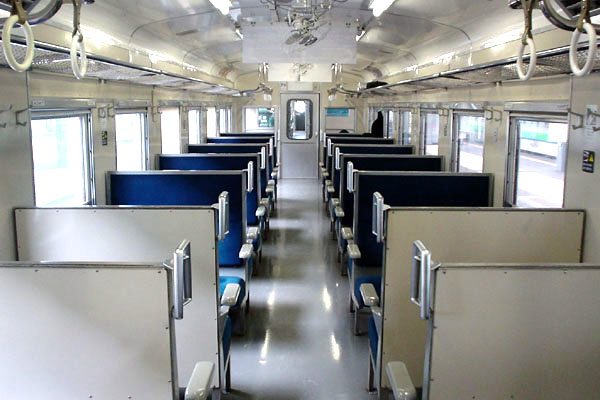
Fixed box seats, JR Hokkaido KiHa 40.

Box seats (ボックスシート, bokkusu shīto) are the fixed cross seats where passengers sit facing each other. This has been the traditional cross seat configuration on JNR/JR trains, commonly seen in older passenger coaches and express-type cars originally designated as third class (later second class, now ordinary class). Due to the structural layout, roughly half of the seats face backward relative to the direction of travel. Even within JNR designs, the seat pitch (distance between opposing seats) ranged from 1,335 mm to 1,580 mm, with many express-type vehicles adopting 1,460 mm. Suburban-type cars manufactured from 1977 onward adopted a 1,470 mm pitch. More recently built suburban and general-type EMUs by JR East (e.g., E217, E231, E233, and E531 suburban variants) feature box seats with a 1,500 mm pitch. Regional-use types such as the E721 and E129 series have further increased this to 1,585 mm. In contrast, second-class cars (later first class, now Green Cars) for regular trains prior to the 1950s used box seats with generous seat pitch—for example, 1,910 mm in the 80-300 series. These were later replaced with rotating cross seats and, in suburban trains, significantly narrower seats and pitch were used to secure an 880 mm aisle width. Additionally, many suburban EMUs with flip-over cross seats, as well as some long-seat trains like the early Keikyu N1000 series (batches 1–5), Nankai 2000 (batches 5–7) and 1000 series, adopt box seats only at the car ends. In the former case, these are dimensionally adjusted to match face-to-face flipped cross seats, while the latter types allow for a more generous pitch around 1,750 mm due to space availability. However, most of the increased pitch is used to recline the seatbacks to match the angle of flip-over seats, so legroom remains similar to that of conventional box seats. Until 1950s, certain second-class (later first class, now Green Cars) cars like the ORo 36 and SaRo 85 were equipped with more comfortable box seating with wider face-to-face spacing than third-class cars. However, these were downgraded to second class (former third class) or ordinary class after the 1960s. For limited express services, box seats were also used in cases such as the ordinary class cars of JNR 581/583 series (during daytime seating), pre-refurbished JR East 253 series Narita Express where seat undersides were used as luggage space, and some cars of the 251 series Super View Odoriko.

- Forward-facing fixed seats

This refers to 2-person fixed cross seats all facing the same direction, as seen in the SuHa 44 and other pre- to postwar third-class coaches used for limited express services. To reduce jolts and noise, luggage or composite seating-luggage cars were placed behind the locomotive, with observation cars at the rear. These formations assumed use of a wye at terminals to reverse the whole train. Unique examples include Odakyu 70000 series GSE and Meitetsu 1000 series, where seats in the observation cars are fixed facing forward.

Also, trolleybuses, due to structural constraints, usually have forward-facing fixed seats - but there are no trolleybuses in Japan currently operational.

- Face-to-face / Back-to-back group seats

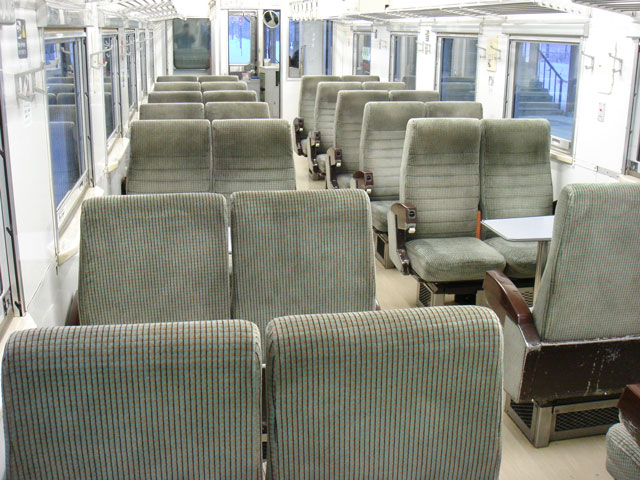
Face-to-face group seats, JR Hokkaido KiHa 54.

In the face-to-face group seat (集団見合型シート, shūdan miai-gata shīto) layout, the seats are divided into two groups at the center of the passenger compartment (or at the center between the doors in vehicles with three or more doors), with all seats in both groups facing toward the center of the vehicle. Conversely, in the back-to-back group seat (集団離反型シート, shūdan rihan-gata shīto) layout, all seats in both groups face toward the ends of the vehicle. The former is often found in long-distance open coach cars in Europe. In Japan, it has been adopted in the original Keikyu 2000 series, JR East 719 series, post-2004 refurbished JR East 253 series (ordinary class), and fixed cross seat versions of the Keikyu 600 series. Back-to-back types were seen in 200 Series Shinkansen (Tōhoku/Jōetsu lines at launch) and 0 Series triple seats. At the time, triple seats could not rotate if simplified recline mechanisms were to be installed. It remains in limited use today, such as in some Sanyo 3000/5000 series cars. In cases such as the original Keihan 9000 series, seats near the ends of the cars face the center of the car, while those in the center face toward the ends. There are also seat configurations that span multiple cars, such as the arrangement seen in the Eizan 900 series and the Kintetsu 260 series, where the seats in the front car face the direction of travel, and those in the rear car face the opposite direction. Advantages include easier optimization of seat cushion and backrest design compared to flip-over cross seats (which require symmetrical shape) or box seats (which require more vertical backrests due to space efficiency). In other words, this layout combines the simplicity of fixed seating, design flexibility comparable to rotating seats, and higher seat capacity (particularly in triple seats on Shinkansen, where narrower pitch is possible). However, in Japan, it is said that passengers are strongly opposed to seats not facing forward, so, as mentioned above, such arrangements are in limited use.

==== Reclining seats ====
Reclining seats allow the backrest to be tilted backward. The first use in JNR was in 1949, when the MaITe 39 observation car was revived for the postwar relaunch of the limited express Heiwa. Full-scale adoption began with the SuRo 60 special second-class cars introduced the following year. These had 5-step mechanical locks and footrests, which became the standard for limited express and express second-class cars (later first class, now Green Cars) until JNR's final years. Initially designed as first-class cars SuI 60, the SuRo 60 series had a seat pitch of 1,250 mm, but the later SuRo 53 had a tighter 1,160 mm pitch, which remains the JR standard for Green Cars in limited express vehicles. The "Parlor Car" model KuRo 151 of the 151 series EMU, which replaced observation coach cars for limited express, had a 1,100 mm pitch for its single reclining seats. An exception was the SuRo 62, converted from a third-class car, which had a maximum pitch of 1,270 mm, the largest for JNR stock at the time.

On the Shinkansen, the 0 Series launched in 1964 with first-class cars that already had the modern seat width. Owing to the broader car body, standard-class cars typically have a 3+2 layout, while Green Cars use a more spacious 2+2 layout.

The first reclining seats in ordinary class appeared in the JNR 183 series in simplified form. Full free-stop reclining seats became standard with the 100 Series Shinkansen (1985) and the KiHa 183-500 (1986). Today, they are standard in most limited express rolling stock.

Since JNR's privatization, ordinary-class seating has been significantly improved. By the late 1990s, the differences between ordinary and Green Car seating had narrowed, limited mainly to angle, size, and pitch. Consequently, in many conventional Green Cars, seat layouts were changed from 2+2 to 2+1 to provide wider seats and maintain a clear distinction.

To compete with highway buses, some night trains (not sleeping cars) installed near-Green Car-level reclining seats in ordinary class, even reusing Green Car seats and adjusting pitch accordingly. This began with the 165 series used on Moonlight Echigo until March 2003. The Naha and Akatsuki night trains featured Legato Seats (レガートシート, regāto shīto) with large reclining angles, arranged in a staggered 1+1 layout. In some 1980s examples, express DMUs in Shikoku and Kyushu repurposed Green Car cars directly as ordinary class without changing the seats.

==== Cross seat configurations ====
Seat width typically measures between 430 mm and 460 mm for ordinary cars in limited express trains, around 450 mm for Green Cars with a 2+2 layout, and between 470 mm and 500 mm for 2+1 layouts or Shinkansen cars. While these numerical differences may seem small, similar to those between standard and Green Cars, or even with long seats, the actual sense of spaciousness depends more on the presence and width of armrests than just seat width, which is usually measured excluding the armrests. Some train cars have sections with one fewer seat than standard layouts to accommodate wheelchairs.

- 2+2 Layout

This layout features two seats on each side of a central aisle per row. Most cross seat configurations in Japanese conventional trains (non-Shinkansen) follow this pattern. It is also used in the Green Cars of Shinkansen trains and, in some cases, even in the standard-class Shinkansen cars such as those on the Sanyō and Kyushu lines.

- 2+3 Layout

This configuration is used in most of the standard-class cars of Shinkansen trains. For example, on the Tōkaidō Shinkansen, three-seat rows are placed on the ocean side, and two-seat rows on the mountain side. In conventional rail with narrower width, it has been adopted in limited cases, such as for school excursion trains (e.g., 155 and 159 series) and the upper deck of the 415-1900, which aimed to increase seated capacity.

- 3+3 Layout

Used in the unreserved upper deck cars of JR East double-decker Shinkansen Max. It consists of three-seat rows on each side of the aisle. Although the seats are rotating cross seats, they do not recline due to the lack of armrests, a result of limited seat width.

- 2+1 Layout

This arrangement combines two seats on one side of the aisle and one on the other. It has become increasingly common in Green Cars of limited express trains after the privatization of JNR. In tilting trains, a staggered seating arrangement is sometimes used to balance weight distribution within the cabin. This layout is also seen in the 400 Series Shinkansen (built to conventional line standards) and in the Gran Class, which is the highest class of service. Some ordinary and rapid service trains also use this layout, primarily to widen the aisle and increase standing capacity. In these cases, seat width is roughly the same as in the 2+2 layout.

The 223-0 series used for Kansai Airport Rapid Service adopted this configuration to provide luggage space for air travelers’ suitcases. It was also effective for handling rush hour crowds, leading to its continuation in subsequent 225-5000/5100, and eventually became the standard for all non-limited express trains on the Hanwa Line. Initially, Norwegian-made seats were used, which had wires beneath the armrests of the single seats for securing luggage, but these were removed when the seats were replaced with domestically made Suminoe Industry seats.

Some trains, like the Sanyo Electric Railway 5030 series, the second-generation Keihan 3000 series, and the Meitetsu 2200 series' standard-class cars, adopt this layout to accommodate both peak and off-peak operations. It's also used in trains with limited cabin width, such as the Keihan 800 series for the Keishin Line, and the JR Central 371 series' SaRoHa 371 cars, where both the upper-deck Green seats and lower-deck ordinary seats used the 2+1 configuration.

- 1+1 Layout

This layout features single seats on both sides of a central aisle. It was used in first-class cars in the past and in the open-style first-class seats of the KuRo 151 “Parlor Car” used on Tōkaidō Main Line express trains. In the 1990s, it was briefly used in some open-style Green Car sections of the 253 series Narita Express trains but was replaced with the 2+1 layout by 2004. Due to the limited seating capacity, this layout is rare. It is mainly seen in narrow-bodied trains like those of narrow gauge railways or trams, such as the Sangi Railway Sangi Railway 270 series or the Yokkaichi Asunarou Railway 260 series, or in side-facing observation seats.

- Others

From 1990 to 2008, the Legato Seat (レガートシート, regāto shīto) cars —reserved seating in ordinary class— were coupled to the Akatsuki limited express, and until 2005 also to the Naha. These cars adopted a high-speed bus-style configuration, featuring independent single seats arranged in a 1+1+1 layout across three columns. On trains such as JR East E127-100 series and the Izukyu 8000 series, cross seats for two passengers and long seats are arranged separately on the left and right sides of the car. In the Premium Green Car of JR East E261 series, a unique layout has been adopted where the aisle is positioned on the mountain side and independent seats are lined up in pairs on the ocean side. This design balances passenger privacy with scenic views of the ocean.

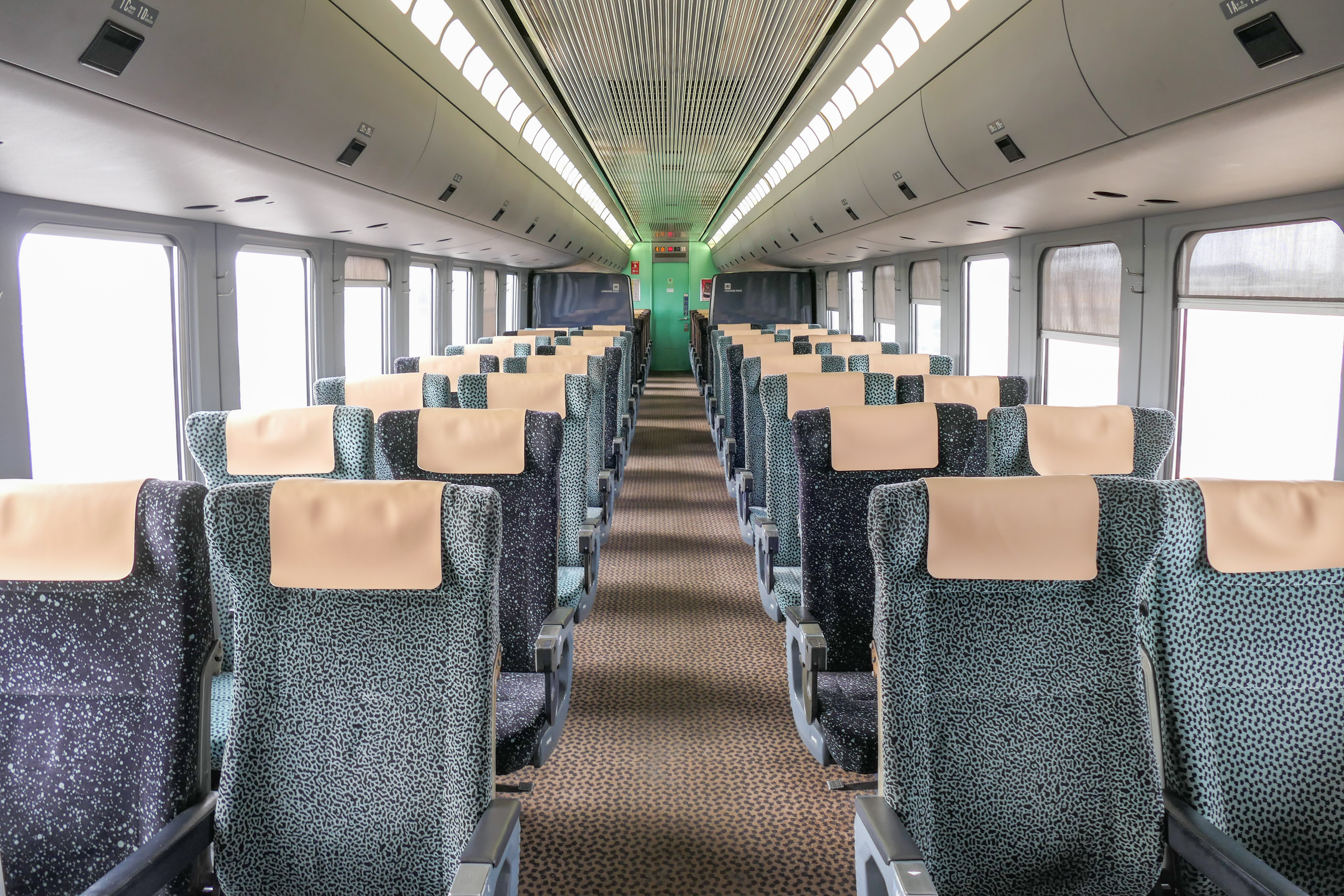
2+2 layout, JR Kyushu KuHa 787.

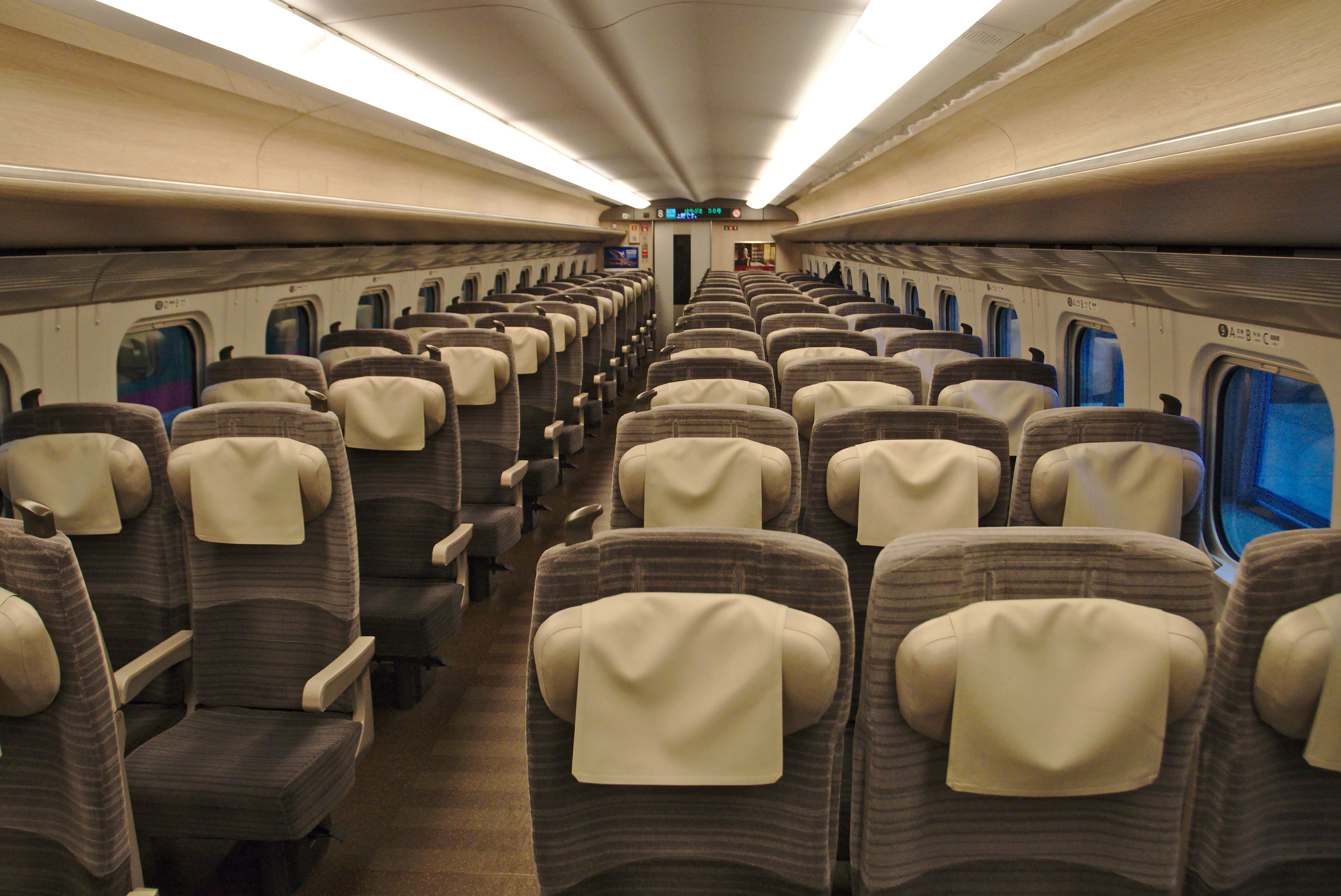
2+3 layout, JR East E5 series Shinkansen.

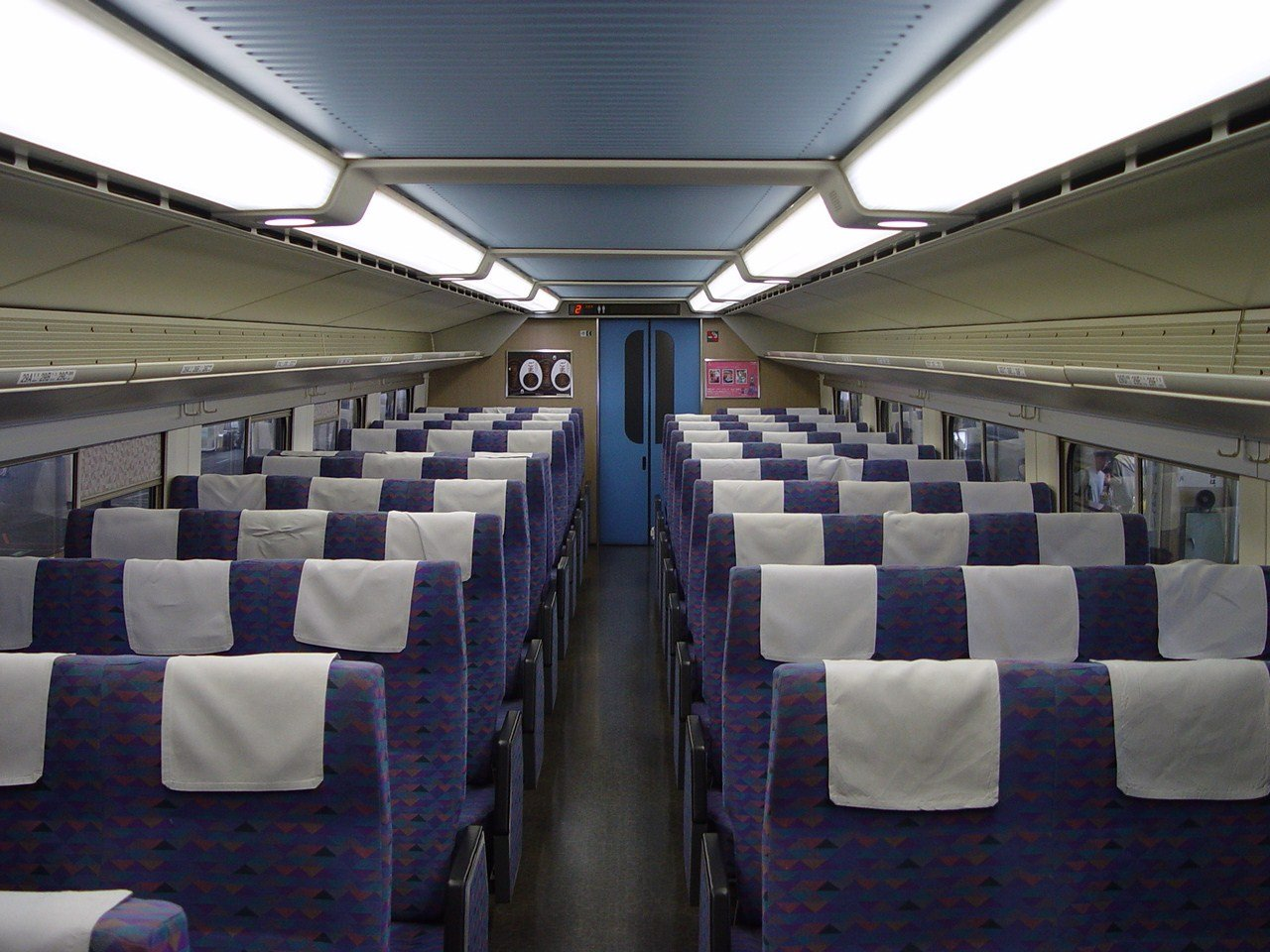
3+3 layout, JR East E4 series Shinkansen (upper deck).

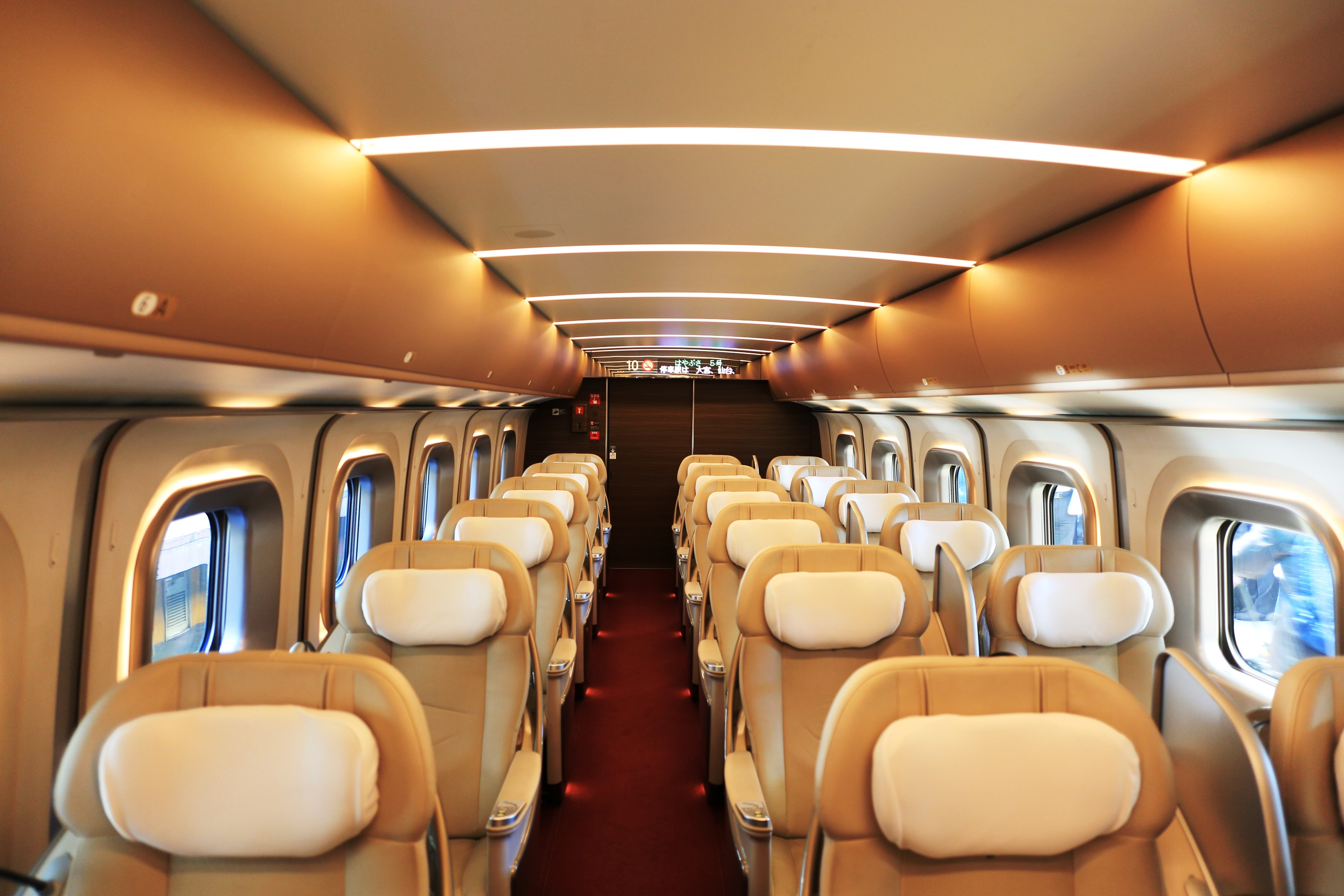
2+1 layout, JR East E5 series Shinkansen (Gran Class).

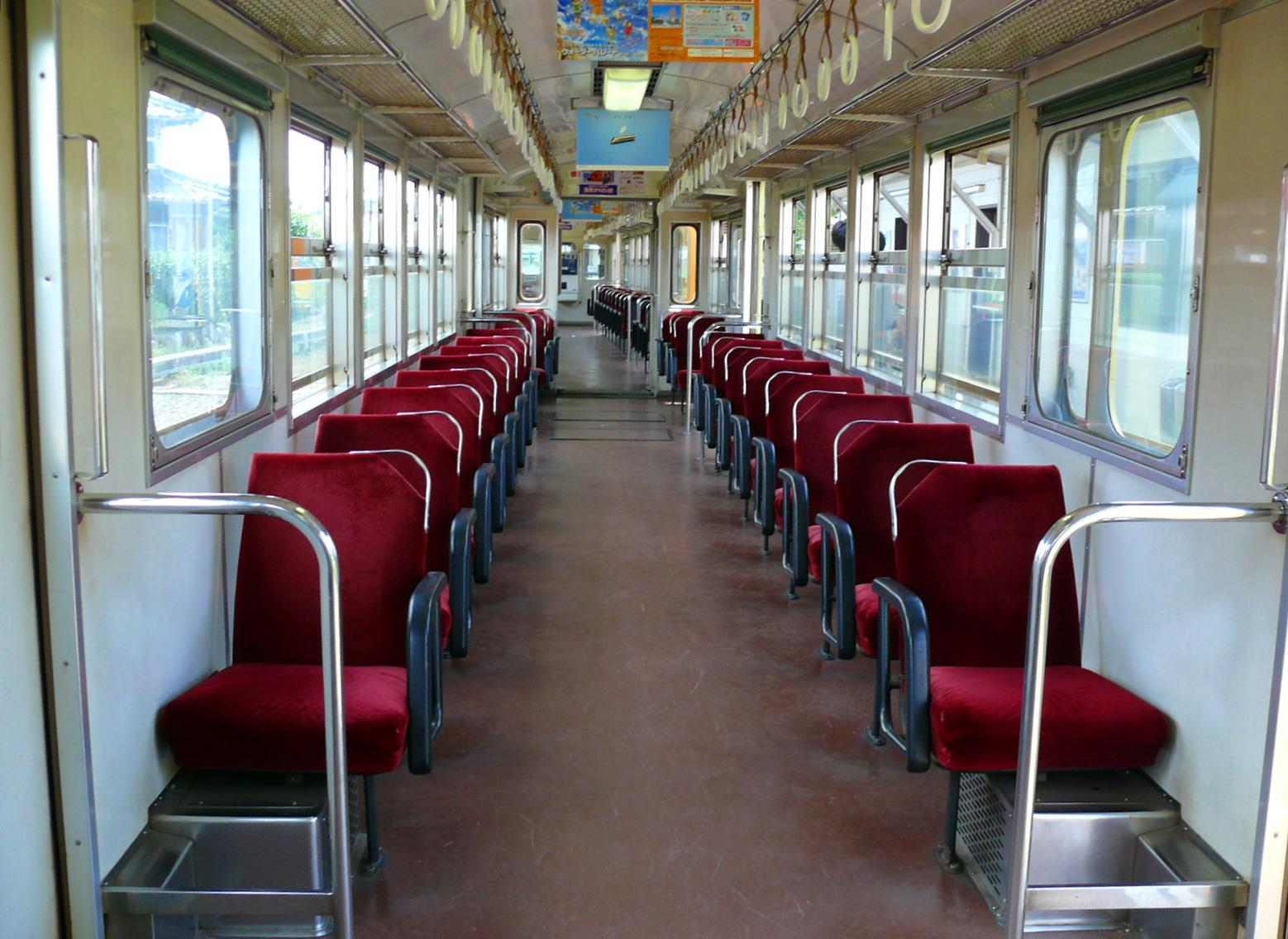
1+1 layout, Kintetsu 260 series.

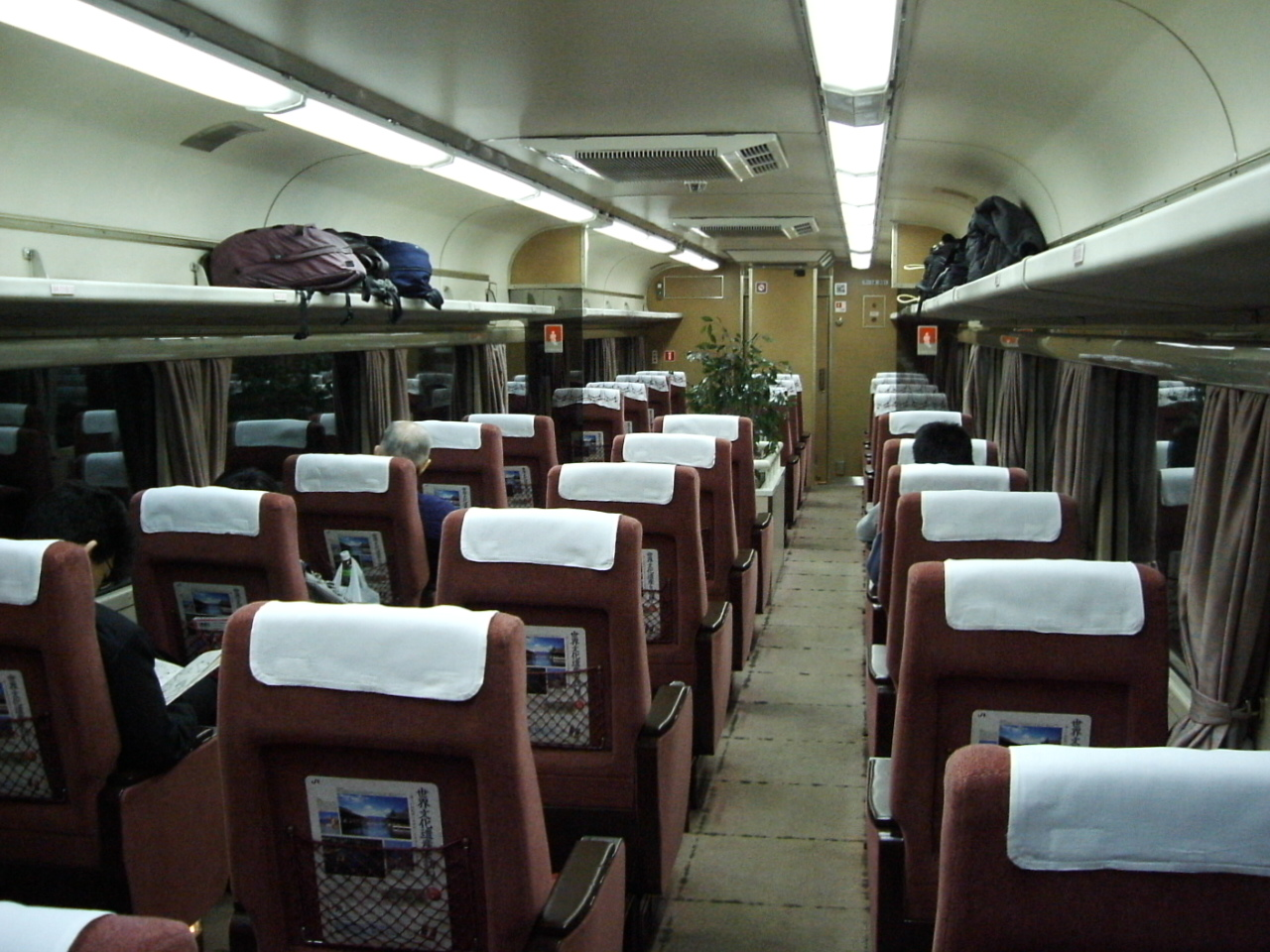
1+1+1 layout "Legato Seat", JR West 14 series Akatsuki.

=== Semi-cross seats ===
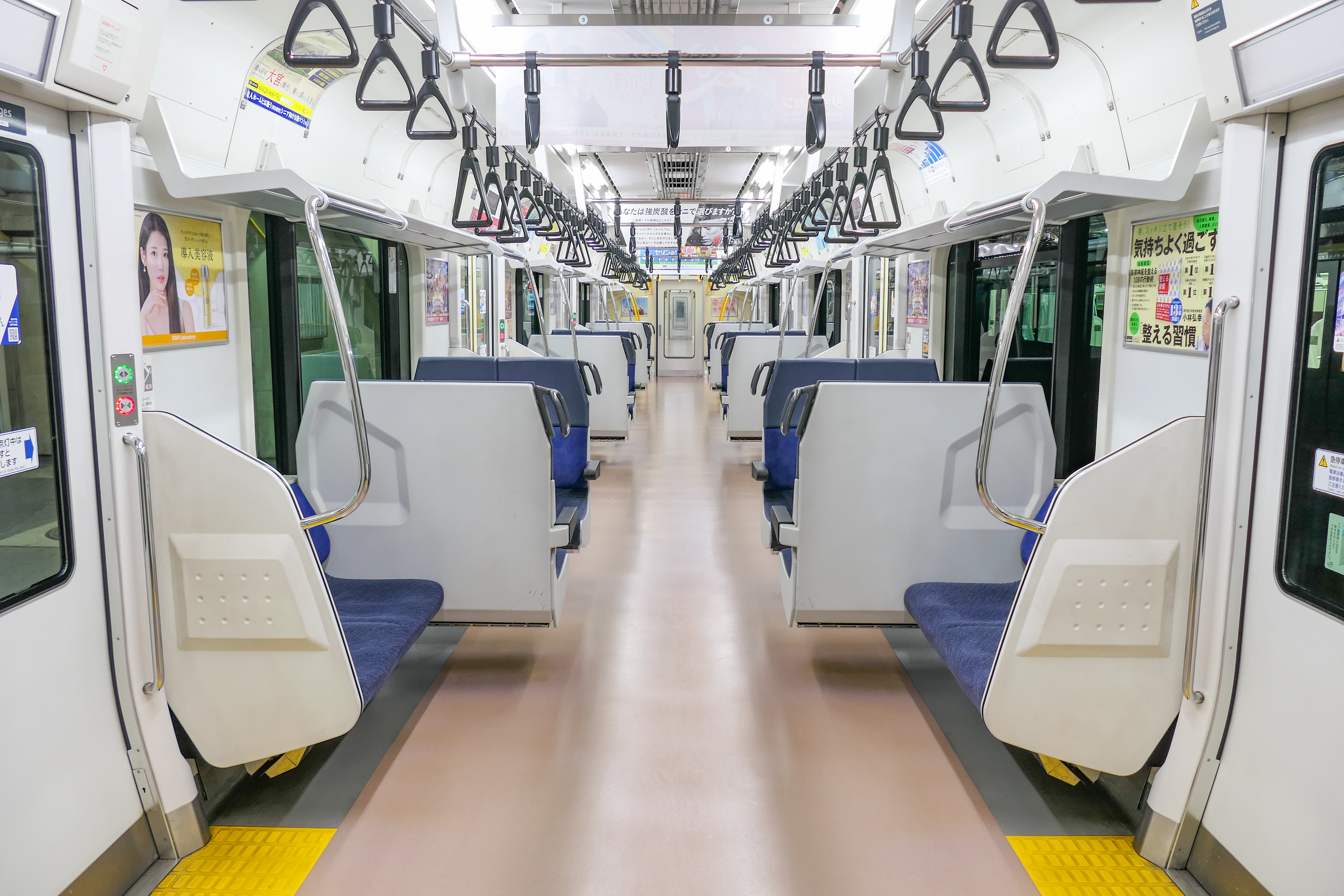
four-door semi-cross seats, JR East E233 series.

A semi-cross seat (セミクロスシート, semi-kurosu shīto) layout combines both long and cross seating. Typically, long seats are placed near the doors for smoother boarding and alighting, while cross seats are installed between the doors. Most cross seats in these layouts are fixed, though some, such as those used by JR West and JR Central, feature flip-over cross seats.

In Japan, such layouts began to appear during the interurban railway construction boom of the 1920s. They aimed to reconcile long-distance travel comfort with rush-hour capacity, and also to prevent interference between traction motor access panels (trapdoors) and cross seat installations. This style continued after World War II, particularly for intercity transport.

Under JNR, such layouts were found in suburban models like the three-door type 113 and 415 series, the two-door type 80, 711, and KiHa 40. Some express-type rolling stock like the AC/DC compatible express EMUs and KiHa 58 were modified into semi-cross seat layouts by converting some seats near the doors into long seats. Even vehicles originally built with long seats have been later modified into semi-cross configurations in response to changing transportation demands, for example, JR East 209 series (for Bōsō region service), Hanshin 8000 series, Tobu 6050 series, Seibu 4000 series, Meitetsu 6000 series, and Nishitetsu 3000 series.

In JNR-type vehicles, three-door cars typically featured two sets of four-seat (two by two) fixed cross seats on each side between the doors, totaling 16 seats. For two-door cars, those with vestibules had cross seats throughout between the doors, while those without vestibules often had long seats near the doors and cross seats in the central section between them.

Since the 1990s, four-door cars with cross seats have increased. The first four-door cross-seat train in Japan was the Kintetsu 2600 series built in 1970, followed by the 2610 and 2680 series. These had only fixed cross seats and no long seats, so they are not semi-cross seat cars. In Kantō region, Sotetsu New 7000 series (unit 7755F) trialed fixed cross seats between the doors in less-crowded cars. This approach was later adopted in their 8000 and 9000 series, as well as in JR East E217, E231 (suburban type), E531, and Tsukuba Express’ TX-2000 series. Other examples include Meitetsu 300 series and Nagoya Municipal Subway 7000 series, where flip-over cross seats and long seats are alternated across doorways. There are also "dual-seat" types, such as Kintetsu's L/C Cars and some commuter trains in Kantō region, which can switch between cross and long configurations.

Additionally, commuter trains like the Tokyu 9000 series, Toei 6300 series (1st/2nd batches), Tokyo Metro Namboku Line 9000 series (1st batch), N1000 and 2000 series (post-downgrade), 1000 and 2000 series (late production), include a few box seats at the car ends.

There are also configurations where cross seats dominate, but long seats are placed at the ends near the driver's cab or at the car ends, such as in JR West 125 series, 223-5500, and 521 series, as well as the Hankyu 6300 series.

Some trains feature cross seats specifically in front of toilets to prevent direct visual contact with users, for instance, the KiHa 35, 211 series, JR East 107 series and in some JR East E233-3000 formations.

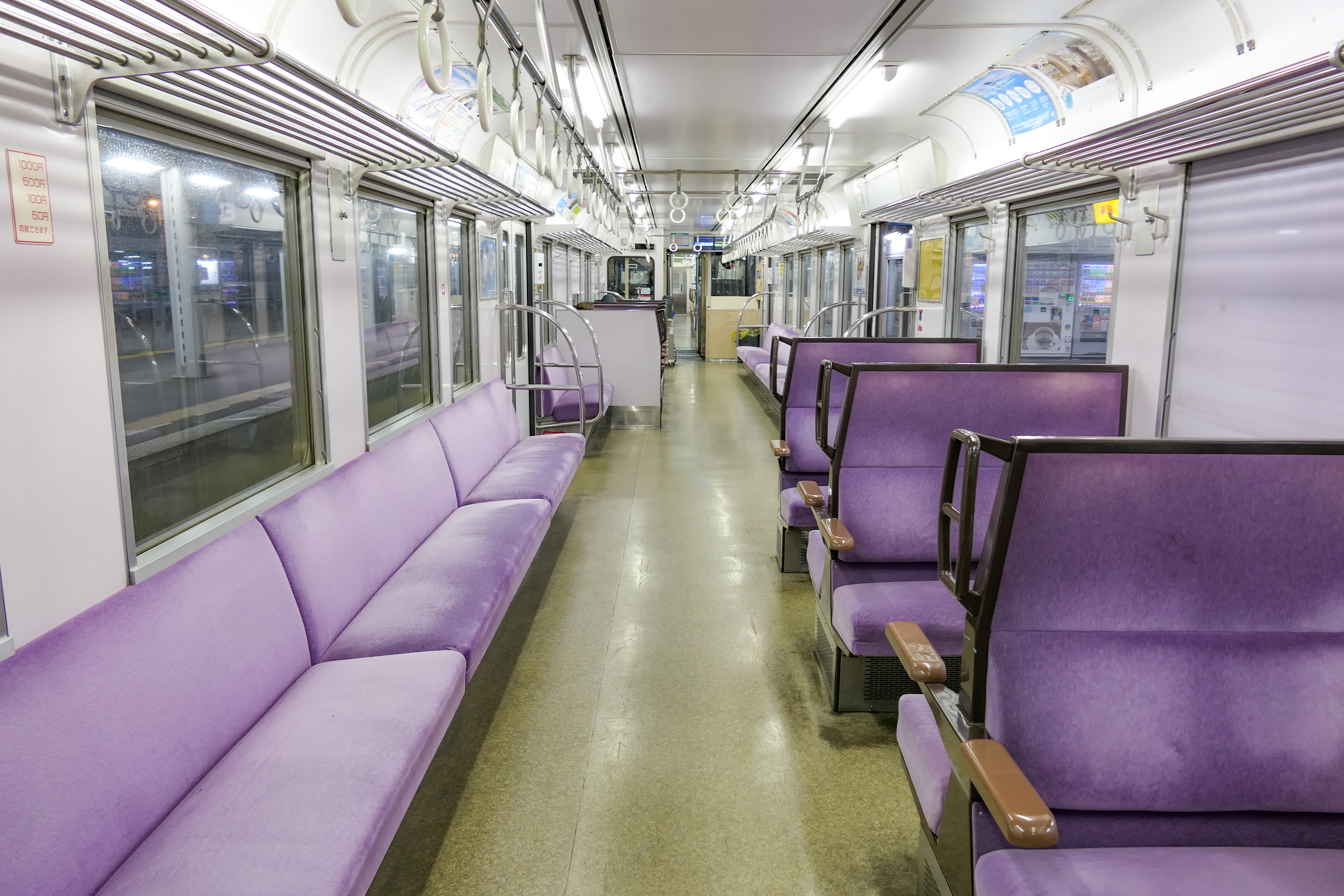
"Checkboard" layout with cross and long seats centered on the car's midpoint. JR Shikoku 7000 series.

Another variation places cross and long seats on opposite sides of the aisle. In pre-war Japan, this was used in cars like the Biwako Railway & Steamship 100 series and Sanyo Electric Railway 100 series, where car width couldn't accommodate two-person cross seats on both sides. Post-war, the layout was also adopted by narrow-gauge (762mm) light railways such as Kusakaru Electric Railway, Senboku Railway (KiHa 2406), and Shimotsui Electric Railway (MoHa 1001, 2000 series Merry Bell). In more recent times, it has appeared in 3-door cars that require a balance of rush-hour capacity and long-distance comfort, such as JR Shikoku 7000 series, JR East 701 series-5000, and JR Kyushu KiHa 220-200. These employ a symmetric “checkerboard” layout centered on the car's midpoint, combining cross and long seats. Compared to standard semi-cross layouts, this offers more aisle space and an open interior without partitions. However, passengers in cross seats may feel uncomfortable being seen in profile by those in adjacent long seats.

In JR East 719 series cars, the cross seats follow a face-to-face group layout, whereas in some of Meitetsu 6000 series, a back-to-back group layout is used.

=== Dual seats ===
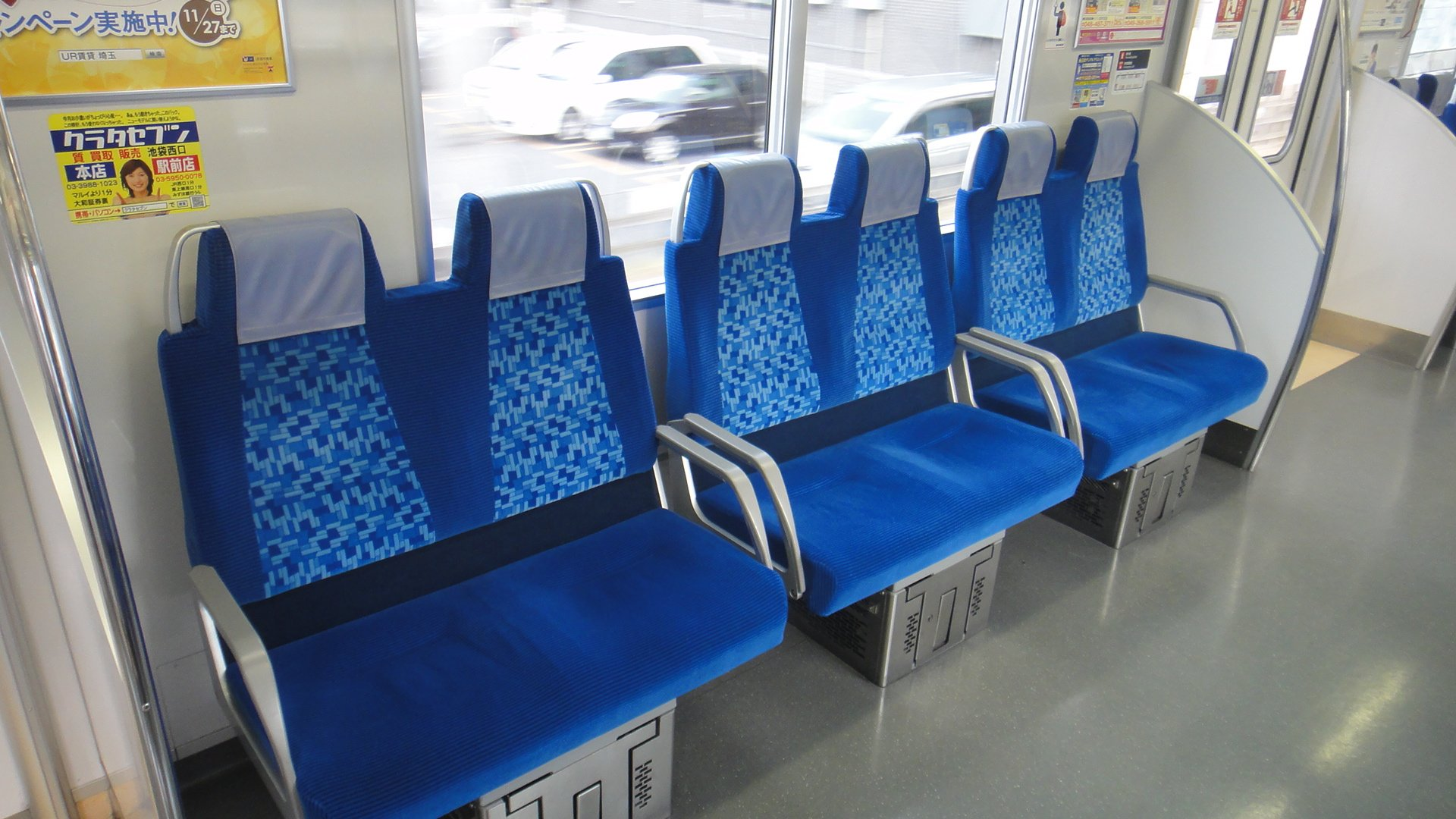
Tobu 50090 series train seats, used in "long seat" mode.

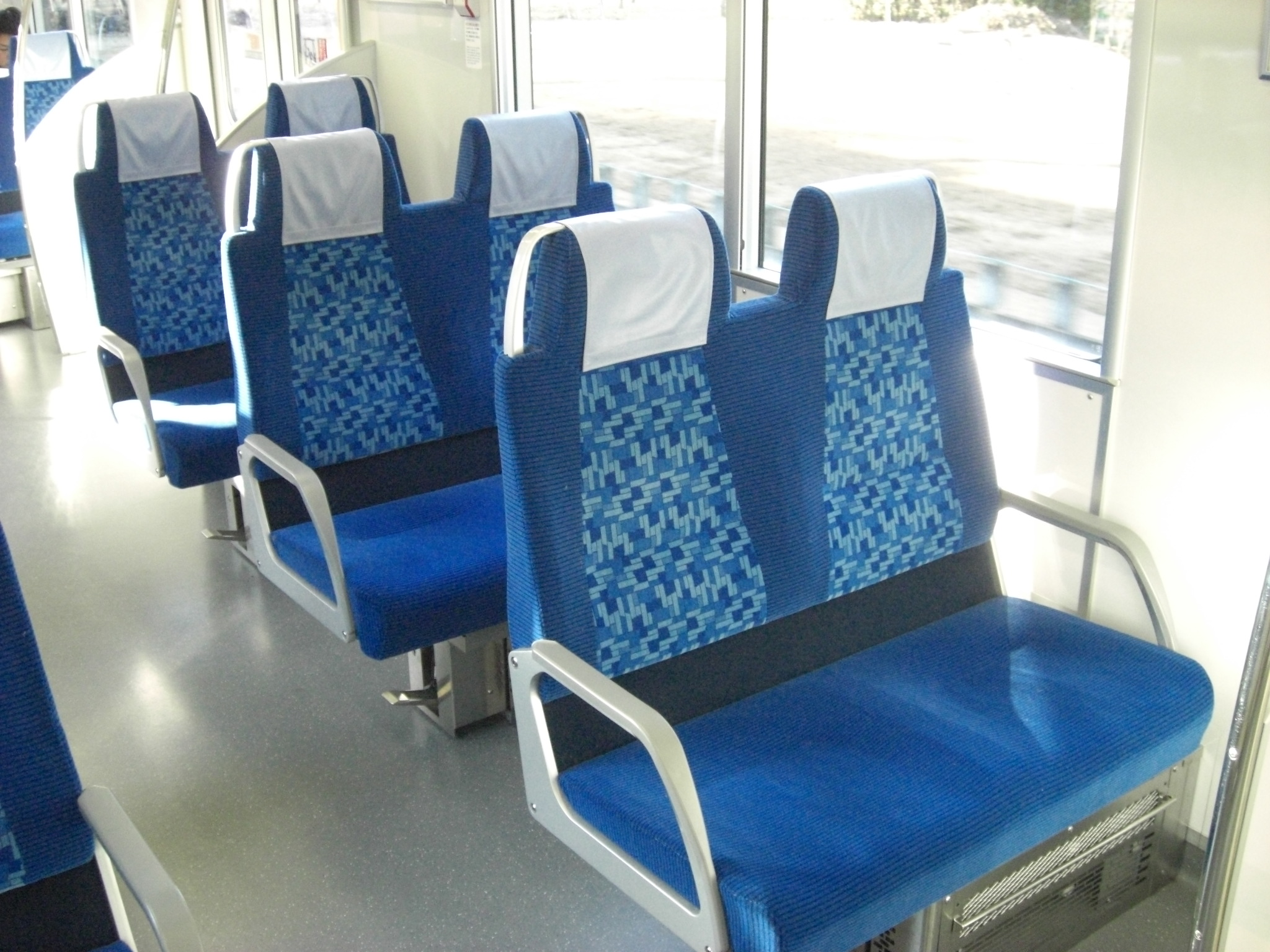
Tobu 50090 series train seats, used in "cross seat" mode.

Dual seats (デュアルシート, dyuaru shīto) are seats that can be converted between both long and cross seat configurations.

Originally developed for use as long seats, with backrests facing the windows, during peak hours, and as rotating cross seats during off-peak times, these seats have primarily been introduced in Kantō region. There, they are used as cross seats for premium express services during the evening rush, and as long seats for regular commuter services at other times. While the seat mechanism is complex, it allows for flexible operation in the configuration best suited to passenger demand. In cross seat mode, passengers can rotate the seat orientation by pressing a foot pedal or pulling a lever located at the rear of the armrest. In long seat mode, the seats are locked and the pedals are retracted, so passengers cannot change the seat direction. The seatbacks were originally fixed and did not have reclining functions; however, the Keio 5000 series (expanded fleet from 2022) became the first to feature reclining seats, usable only in cross seat mode.

The concept itself is not new. The first prototype was created in 1972 by JNR, when car No. KuHa 79929 belonging to the Hanwa Line’s Ōtori depot was experimentally modified at the Suita Works. This prototype was not put into actual service due to its low seatback height in cross seat mode, which was matched to that of long seating. Later, in 1996, a practical version was trialed on modified cars from Kintetsu 2610 series used for long-distance express services, which led to full implementation. The vehicles were collectively referred to as L/C Cars (L/Cカー, eru-shī-kā), and Kintetsu followed up with newly manufactured 5800 series in 1997 and the 5820 series Series 21 in 2000. The 8A series, which began operation in 2024, also belongs to this category. All of these models feature fixed long seats at the ends of the cars. Excluding limited express, these vehicles are used regardless of train types.

Among other major private railways, similar seat types are found in Tobu 50090 and 70090 series, Seibu 40000-0 series, Keio 5000 series, Tokyu 6000 series (second-generation), 6020 series, and 5050-4000 series, and Keikyu 1000-1890 series. Among local private railways, they are used in Shinano Railway SR1 series and Ichibata Electric Railway 8000 series. Tobu refers to these seats as Multi Seats (マルチシート, maruchi shīto), but other operators do not assign specific names to the seating itself.

Among the JR Group, JR East introduced a similar type called 2-WAY Seats (2WAYシート, tsū-wei shīto) in the lead cars facing Ishinomaki on five sets of modified 205 series trains used on the Senseki Line. This was intended to promote ridership on the line as a sightseeing route. However, after the Senseki-Tōhoku Line opened and Senseki Line rapid services were discontinued in 2015, the seats have remained fixed in long seat configuration. JR East also trialed convertible seating in some units of the 209 series used on the Hachikō Line and the lead cars of the E331 series, where seats folded into the walls and could not be manually converted. However, neither of these concepts reached full implementation.

As of 2025, all dual-seat configurations have only been installed in EMUs, with no examples found in passenger coaches or diesel railcars.

=== Foldable seats ===
Foldable seats are sometimes implemented as stowable or retractable seats. The first example of implementation in Japanese commuter trains was the Keihan 5000 series, where the seats retract into the ceiling when stored. The foldable seats type gained widespread recognition with JR East 205 series SaHa 204 cars with 6 doors per side, added to Yamanote Line formations. These 6-door cars folded away all seats during rush hours. In contrast, trains like the 731 series and KiHa 201 had foldable seats only near the doors. Some Meitetsu 3500 series cars featured simple single-seater foldable seats without locking mechanisms. The Keisei New 3100 series, used for airport access, has storage seats built into the middle of the long seats to serve as luggage space.

In cross seat trains, stowable seats near the doors can be found in JR West 223 and 225 series (both excluding some subserieses), Keihan 8000 series, Hankyu 6300 and 9300 Series, Meitetsu 5700 and 1200 series, and the Keikyu 2100 series. There are also examples on the deck areas of double-decker Shinkansen Max trains and certain Kintetsu limited express trains, and even in passageways on older rolling stock like the JNR 24 series sleeper coaches. In JR West, Keihan, and Hankyu, these are called auxiliary seats (補助いす, hojo-isu). Similarly, the now-retired Tobu 5700 series limited express cars had bus-style auxiliary seats. The Nankai 2300 series also has a foldable long seat located in the wheelchair space.

In the 1970s or earlier, folding pipe chairs were mounted near the doors on Hankyu Kyoto Line and Keihan limited express trains, which passengers could freely detach and sit on.

Keikyu 600 series had a unique configuration called Twingle Seats (ツイングルシート, tsuinguru shīto). This model, rare among subway-compatible trains in Japan, was introduced with all fixed cross seats. To improve standing room, some two-person seats could be retracted into single-person seats, allowing seat count flexibility. However, within a few years, the retractable function was discontinued, and the Twingle Seats were removed when the cars were later converted to long seats.

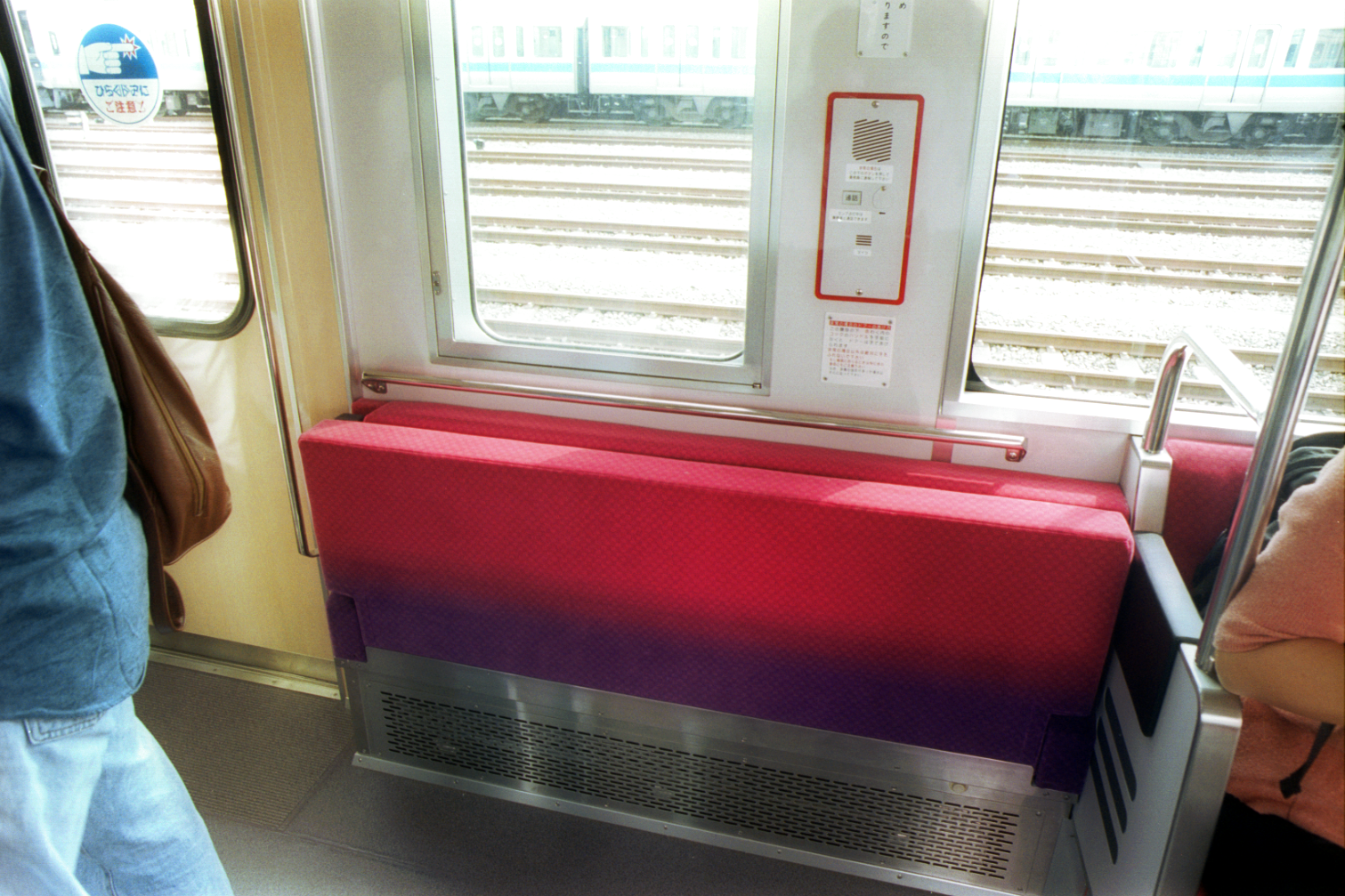
Foldable seats, Odakyu 3000 series.

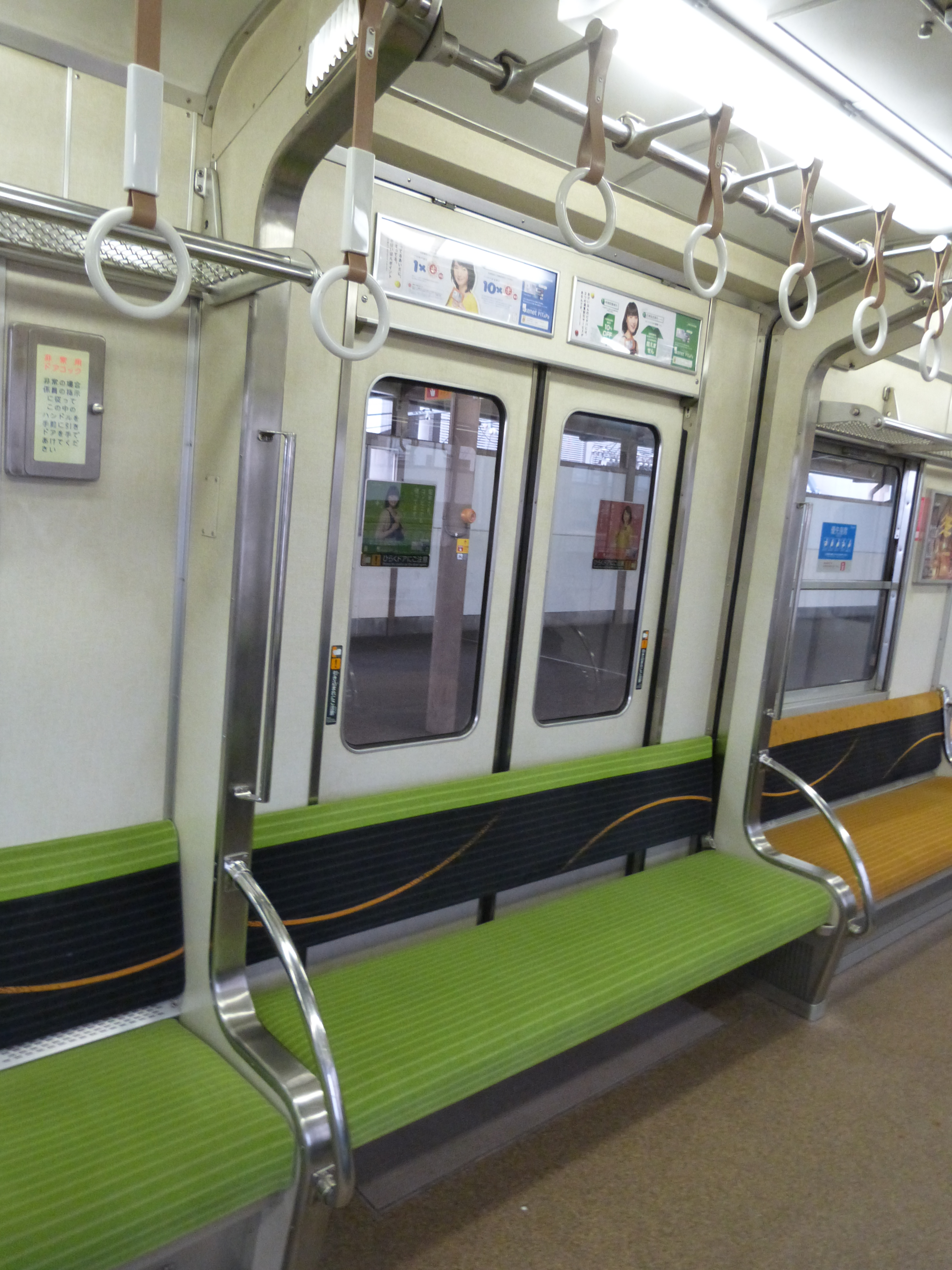
Stowable seats where they retract into the ceiling when stored, Keihan 5000 series.

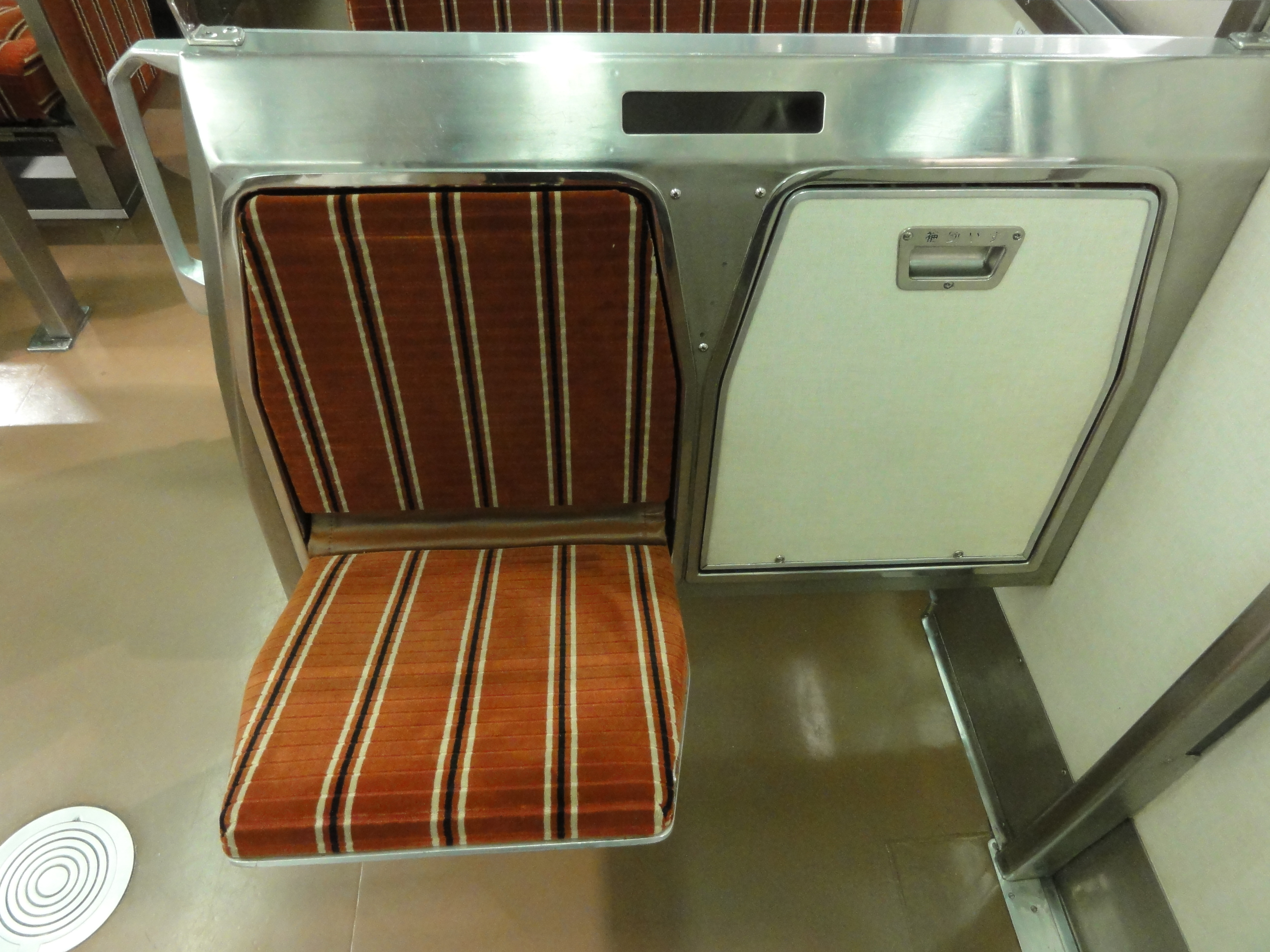
Stowable spare seats, Keihan 3000 series.

=== Ozashiki ressha ===
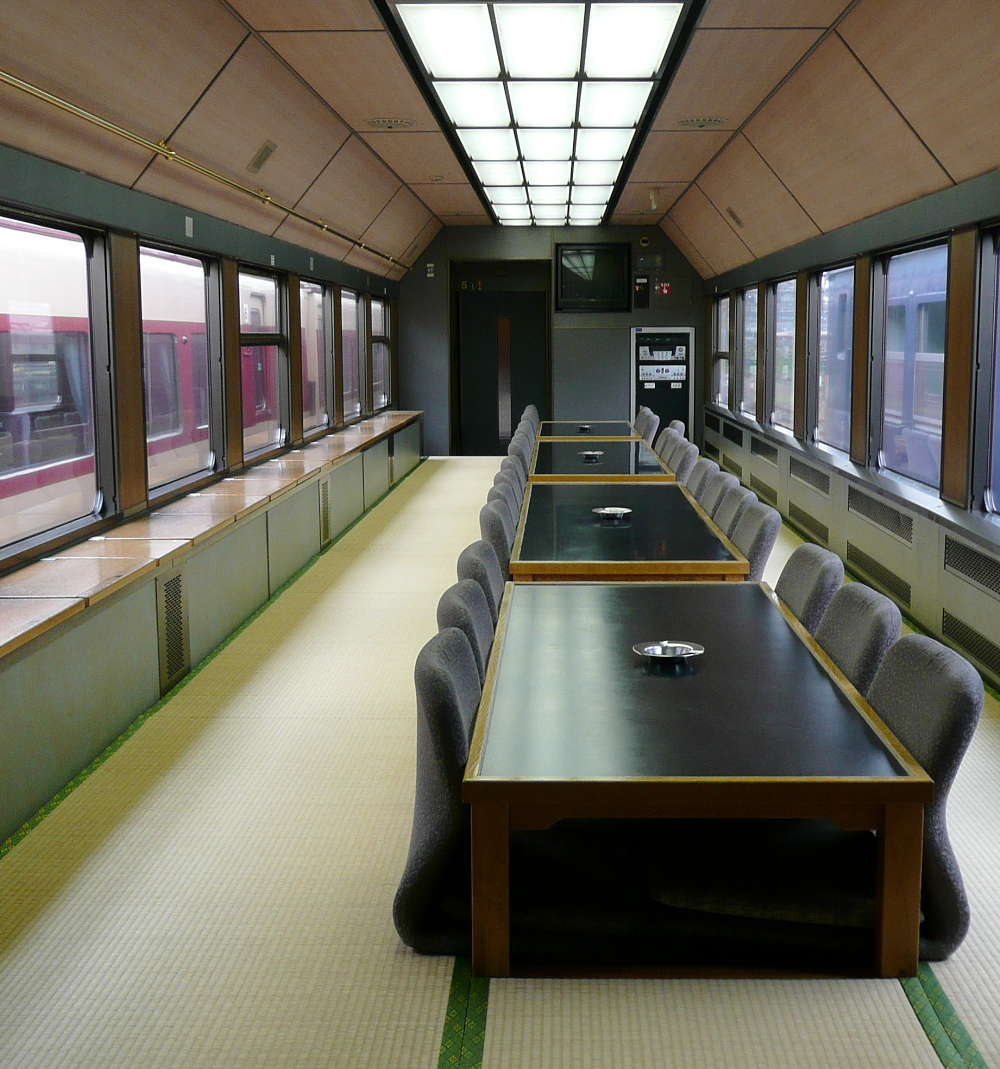
JR East Utage, based on JNR 485 series.

In Japan, there is a unique category of train known as the ozashiki ressha (お座敷列車; lit. 'tatami train'). These trains feature traditional Japanese tatami mats laid across the floor instead of Western-style seating, and passengers sit on zaisu (legless chairs). As in Japanese homes, passengers are required to remove their shoes before entering the tatami-covered area.

This seating style is mainly used in a type of train known as a Joyful Train. Joyful Trains are special railcars operated by the JNR/JR, primarily for use in group tourism and chartered sightseeing services. Most of these trains are refurbished express-type cars that became surplus following the discontinuation of regular express services (in favor of limited express services). These cars originally featured standard cross-seat arrangements before their conversion.

However, since the burst of Japan's economic bubble, group train travel has declined in favor of small-group trips and chartered bus tours. As a result, the use of ozashiki ressha cars has also been on the decline.

=== Other seat arrangements ===
==== Simple perch seats in wheelchair areas ====
On trains like the Seibu 40000 series and Kyoto Municipal Subway 20 series, one end car on each set has a wheelchair space that spans the area between the doors. In the center partition of this space, there are simple perch seats that passengers can lightly lean against.

==== Seats with bi-directional orientation ====
In the Kintetsu 8A series, Fukuoka City Subway 4000 series, and Tobu 80000 series, the free space area is equipped with seats that allow passengers to sit facing either longitudinal or transverse directions.

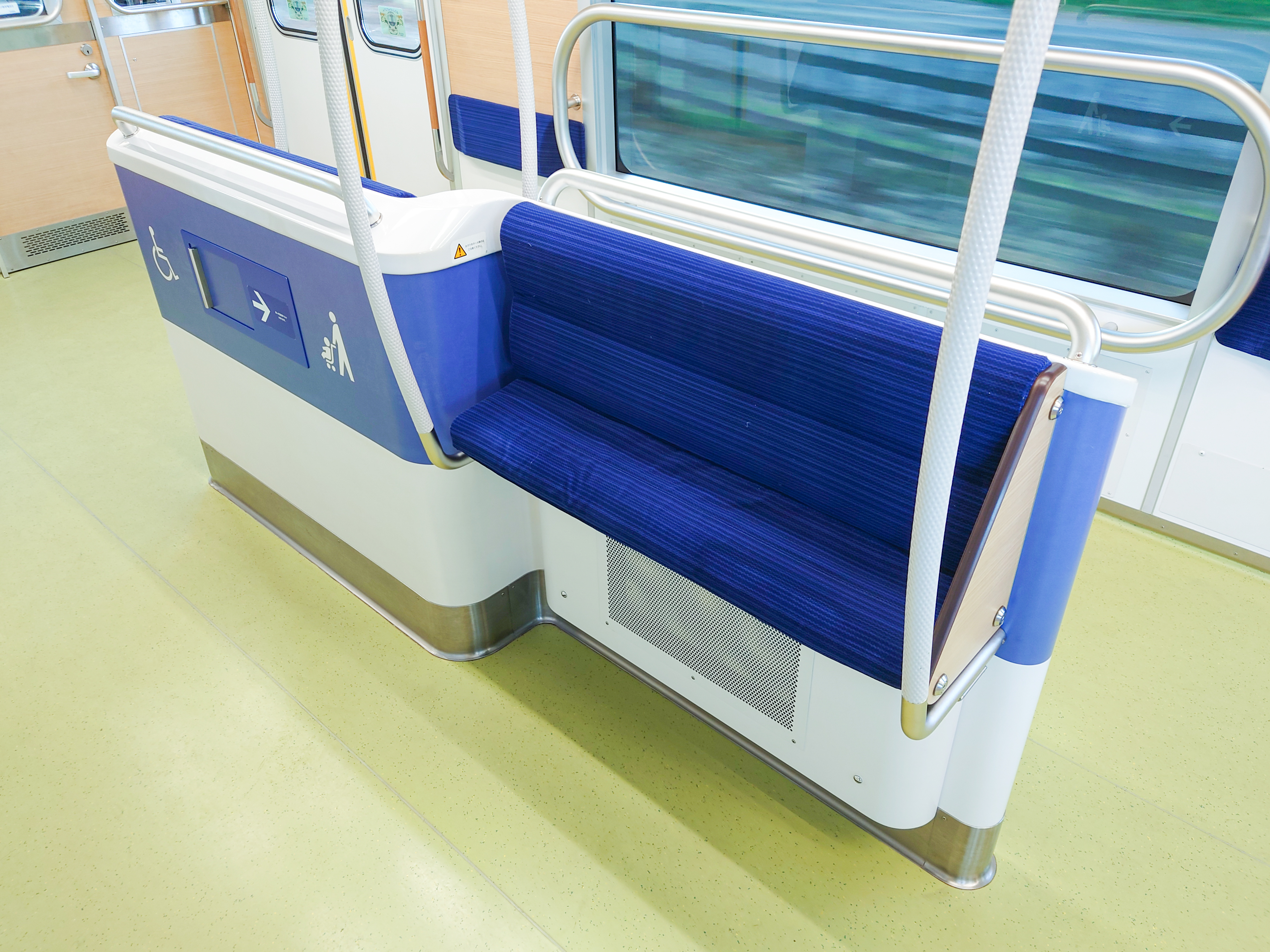
Center partition, Seibu 40000 series.

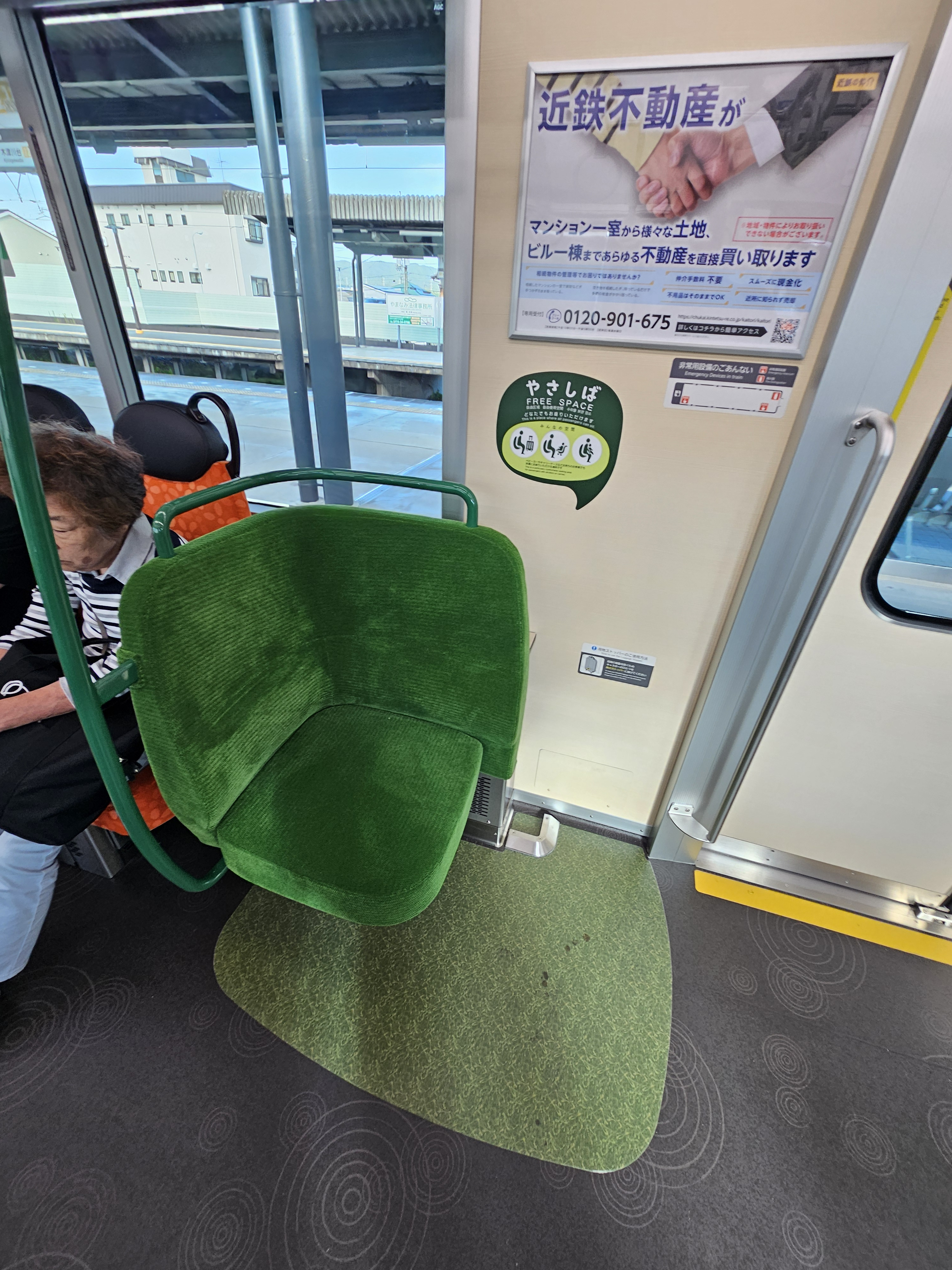
A bi-directional seat, Kintetsu 8A series.

== See also ==
- Hard seat
