= 5000 series =

5000 series may refer to:

== Chicago train type ==
- 5000 series (CTA)

== Japanese train types ==
- Chichibu Railway 5000 series EMU
- Chikuho Electric Railroad 5000 series electric multiple unit operated on the Chikuhō Electric Railroad Line
- Fujikyu 5000 series EMU
- Hankyu 5000 series EMU
- Ichibata Electric Railway 5000 series EMU
- JR Shikoku 5000 series EMU
- Kantō Railway KiHa 5000 series DMU, in service since 2009 on the Jōsō Line
- Keihan 5000 series EMU
- Keio 5000 series (1963) EMU, in service from 1963 until 1996
- Keio 5000 series (2017) EMU, in service since 2017
- Kobe Municipal Subway 5000 series EMU operated on the Kaigan Line
- Meitetsu 5000 series (1955) EMU, in service from 1955 until 1986
- Meitetsu 5000 series (2008) EMU, in service since 2008
- Nagoya Municipal Subway 5000 series EMU
- Odakyu 5000 series (1969) EMU, in service from 1969 until 2012
- Odakyu 5000 series (2019) EMU, in service since 2020
- Sanyo 5000 series EMU
- Sapporo Municipal Subway 5000 series subway cars
- Seibu 5000 series EMU
- Shinetsu 5000 series EMU operated on the Kobe Electric Railway
- Shonan Monorail 5000 series monorail
- Sotetsu 5000 series EMU
- Tobu 5000 series EMU
- Tokyo Metro 5000 series EMU
- Tokyu 5000 series (1954) EMU, in service from 1954 until 1986
- Tokyu 5000 series EMU, in service since 2002

== Korean train types ==
- Seoul Metro 5000 series

== Other ==
- Dell Inspiron 5000 series laptop computers
- Radeon HD 5000 series graphics processing units from AMD
- Radeon RX 5000 series graphics processing units from AMD

== See also ==
- Toei Class E5000 electric locomotive
- 5000 (disambiguation)
