= Meitetsu 9500 series =

Japanese train type

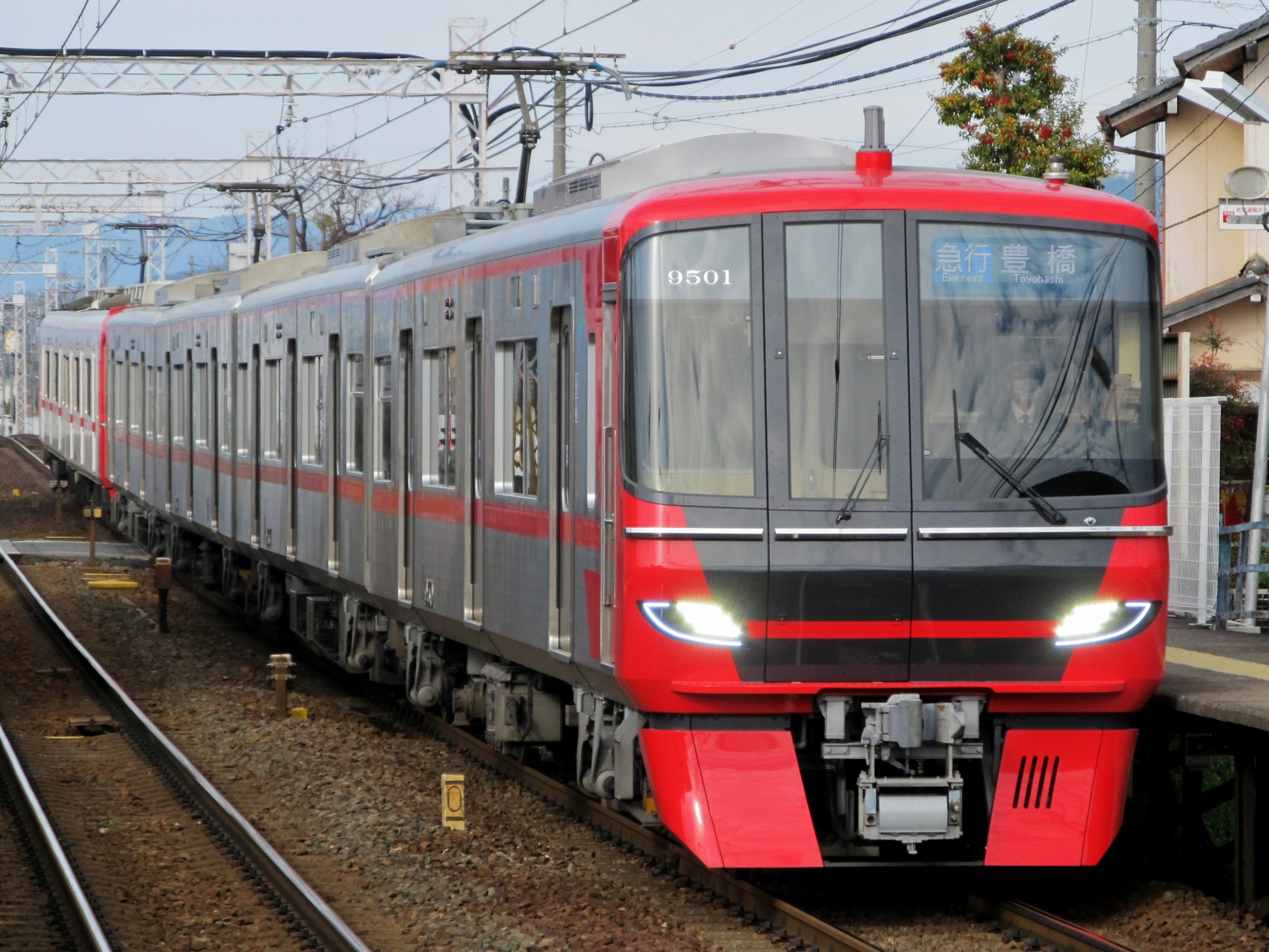
- A 9500 series train in December 2019
- In service: 2019–present
- Manufacturer: Nippon Sharyo
- Replaced: 5300 series, 5700 series
- Constructed: 2019–present
- Entered service: 1 December 2019
- Number under construction: 9500 series: 12 vehicles (3 sets)
- Number built: 9500 series: 68 vehicles (17 sets); 9100 series: 24 vehicles (12 sets)
- Number in service: 9500 series: 60 vehicles (15 sets); 9100 series: 20 vehicles (10 sets)
- Formation: 4 cars per 9500 series trainset; 2 cars per 9100 series trainset
- Fleet numbers: 9101–9110, 9121, 9122, 9501–9515, 9521
- Capacity: 524 per 9500 series trainset; 250 per 9100 series trainset
- Operator: Meitetsu
- Depot: Shinkawa
- Line served: Nagoya Main Line

Specifications
- Car length: 18,385 mm (60 ft 3.8 in) (end car); 18.23 m (59 ft 10 in) (intermediate car)
- Width: 2,744 mm (9 ft 0 in)
- Height: 4,016 mm (13 ft 2.1 in)
- Doors: 3 pairs per side
- Maximum speed: 120 km/h (75 mph)
- Traction system: Hybrid SiC-IGBT–VVVF
- Traction motors: 4 × 170 kW (230 hp) 3-phase AC induction motor
- Electric systems: 1,500 V DC overhead catenary
- Current collection: Pantograph
- UIC classification: 2′2′+Bo′Bo′+2′2′+Bo′Bo′ (9500); 2′2′+Bo′Bo′ (9100)
- Track gauge: 1,067 mm (3 ft 6 in)

The Meitetsu 9500 series (名鉄9500系) is an electric multiple unit (EMU) train type operated by the private railway operator Meitetsu in Japan since 2019.

A two-car version is designated as 9100 series.

== 9100 series ==
9100 series trains are formed as follows, with two cars per set.

Seven sets are on the active roster as of 15 June 2022.

| Car | Tc | Mc |
|---|---|---|
| Capacity | 125 | 125 |

== 9500 series ==
9500 series trains are formed as follows, with four cars per set.

Twelve sets are on the active roster as of 15 June 2022.

| Car | Tc | M | T | Mc |
|---|---|---|---|---|
| Capacity | 125 | 137 | 137 | 125 |

== Interior ==
The trains are equipped with CCTV cameras, multilingual passenger information displays, and free Wi-Fi.

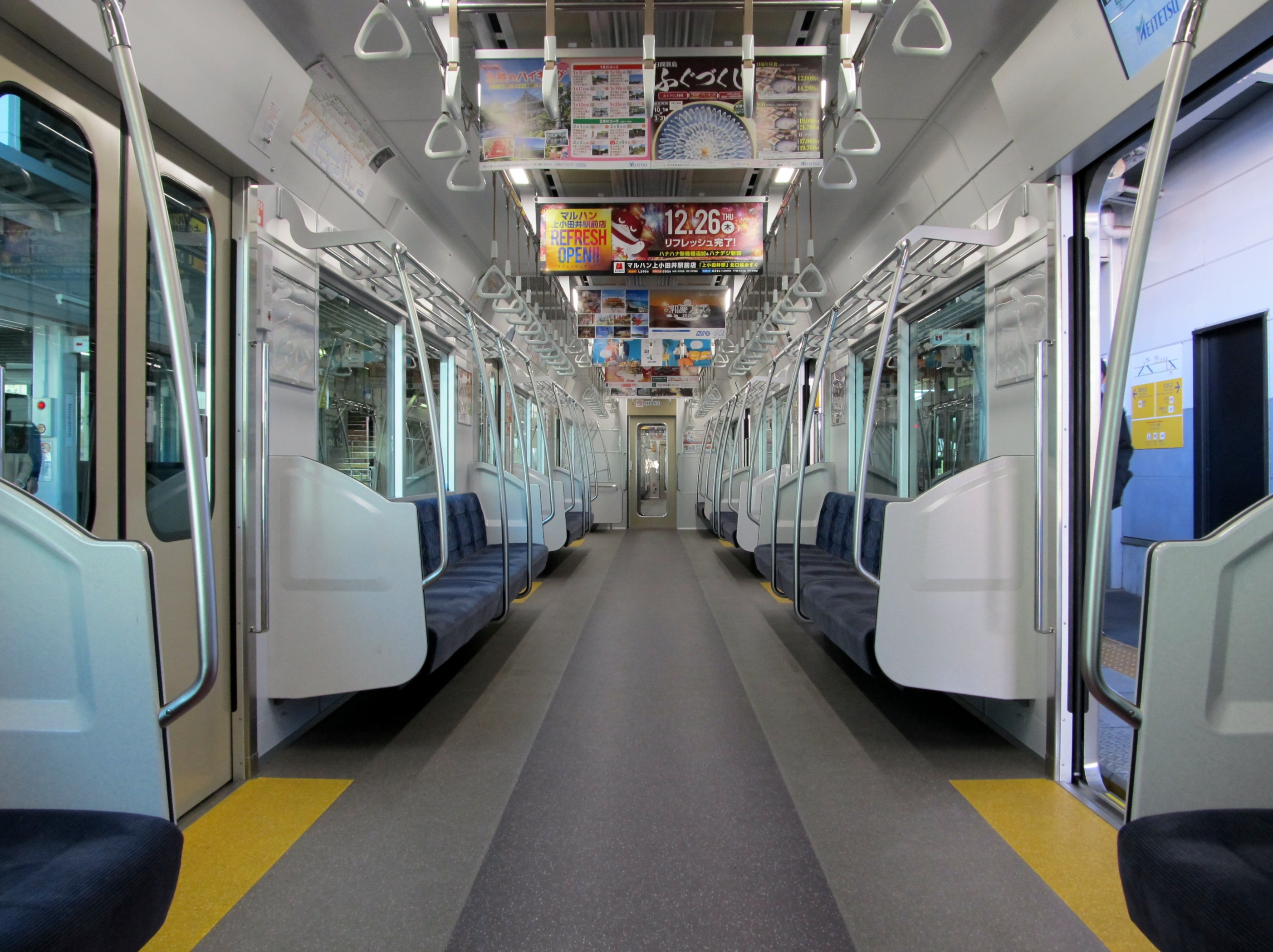
Interior view

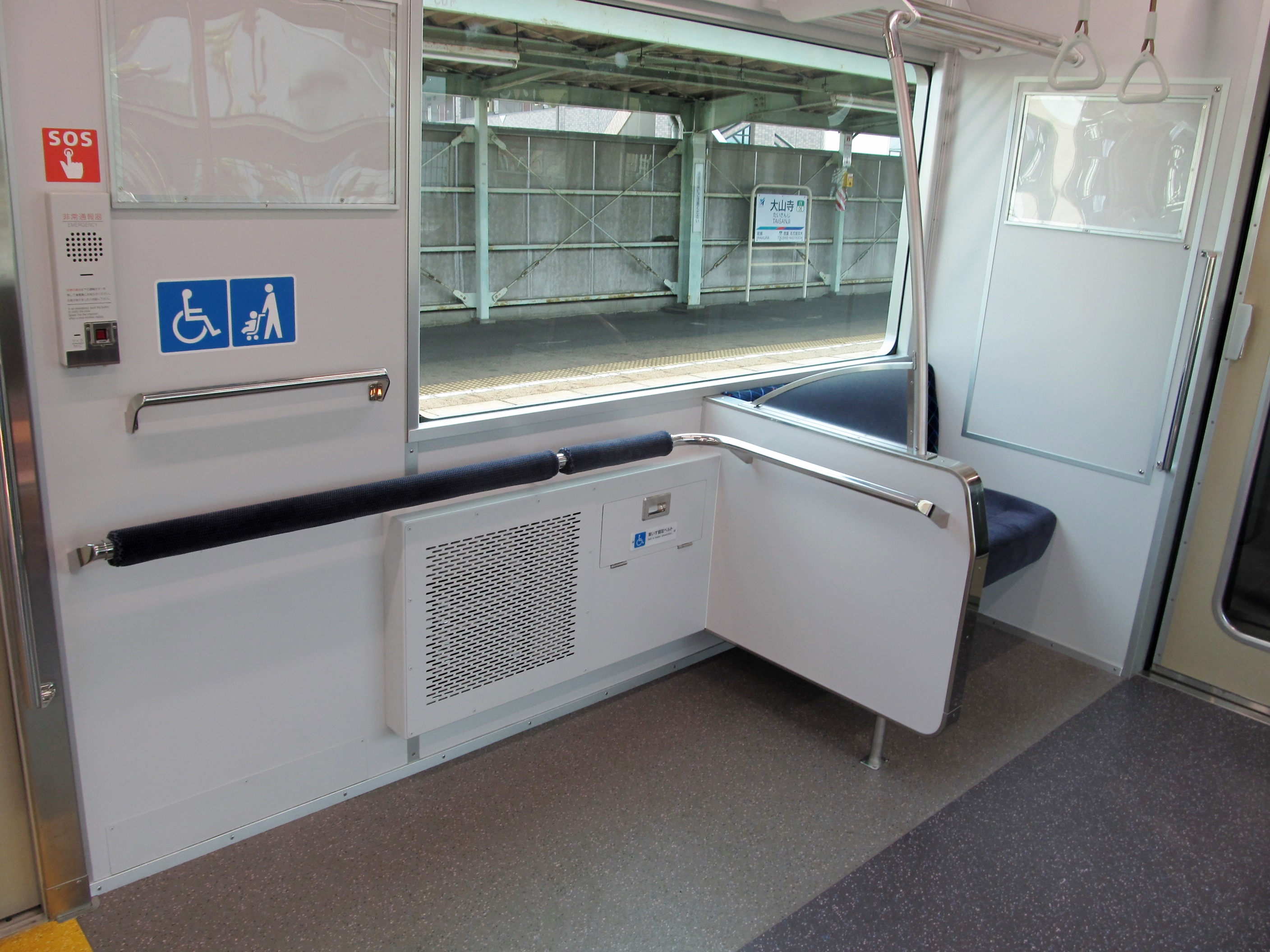
Wheelchair space

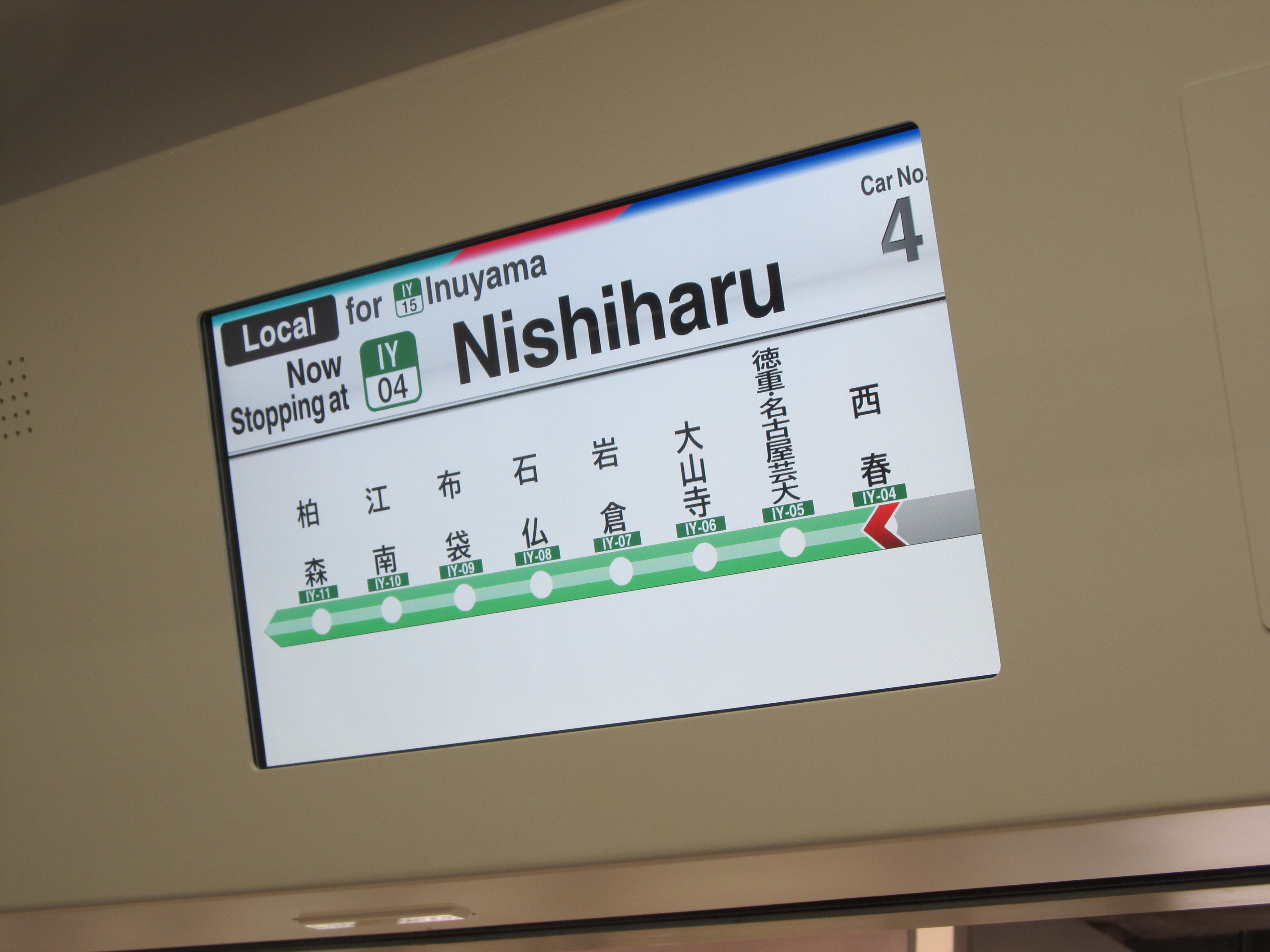
Passenger information display

== History ==
Meitetsu announced the construction of four 9500 series commuter trains as part of their capital investment plan on 25 March 2019. One set was delivered from the Nippon Sharyo Toyokawa plant over 8 and 9 July 2019. Set 9501 was first tested at Maigi inspection center in early July 2019. Trial operation on the Nagoya Main Line began on 29 July 2019.

Sets 9501 and 9502 entered service on 1 December 2019.

9100 series trains entered service in January 2021.

Four 9500 series trainsets and a 9100 series trainset are due to be constructed as part of Meitetsu's investment plan for fiscal 2022.

In 2023, an additional procurement was made for three 9500 series and three 9100 series sets. Two of the 9100 series sets were delivered in September 2023; 9109 and 9110.

In May 2024, Meitetsu announced that as part of its 2024 capital investment plan, three more 9500 series sets and two more 9100 series sets are scheduled to be introduced from fiscal 2024. Unlike the previous batches, these sets will feature a centrally-positioned through door at the cab ends to allow for smoother evacuation of passengers during emergency situations and enable passengers to walk from one train to the other through a gangway connection when operated on coupled services in the future. Sets 9521, 9121 and 9122 were delivered from the Nippon Sharyo factory in February 2025. Four more 9500 series sets are scheduled for delivery in 2025. The first among these, 9524, was delivered from the Nippon Sharyo factory in August 2025.
