= Meitetsu 5000 series =

Meitetsu 5000 series may refer to one of two electric train types operated in Japan by the Nagoya Railroad (Meitetsu):

- Meitetsu 5000 series (1955), in service 1955-1986
- Meitetsu 5000 series (2008), in service 2008-
