= 5030 =

5030 may refer to:

- A.D. 5030, a year in the 6th millennium CE
- 5030 BCE, a year in the 6th millennium BC
- 5030, a number in the 5000 (number) range

== Other uses ==
- 5030 Gyldenkerne, an asteroid in the Asteroid Belt, the 5030th asteroid registered
- Hawaii Route 5030, a state highway
- Sanyo 5030 series, an electric multiple unit train type
- Ford 5030 tractor; see List of Ford vehicles
- Nokia 5030, a cellphone, part of the Series 30
