= 5000 =

5000 or variation, may refer to:

== In general ==
- A.D. 5000, the last year of the 5th millennium CE
- 5000 BCE, a year in the 5th millennium BC
- 5000s AD, a decade, century, millennium in the 6th millennium CE
- 5000s BCE, a decade, century, millennium in the 6th millennium BC
- 5000 (number)

== Music ==
- Powerman 5000, an industrial hard rock band
- "5000", a 2002 song by Nelly from Nellyville
- Michael "5000" Watts, rap artist

== Other uses ==
- 5000 metres, an event raced by long-distance athletes
- United States $5000 bill featuring a portrait of James Madison
- Ford 5000, a tractor
- 5000 IAU, an asteroid in the Asteroid Belt, the 5000th asteroid registered
- 5000 (District of Berat), one of the postal codes in Albania
- Audi 5000, a mid-size luxury car

== See also ==
- 5000 series (disambiguation)
- The 5000 (disambiguation)
