= Sanyo 5030 series =

Japanese train type

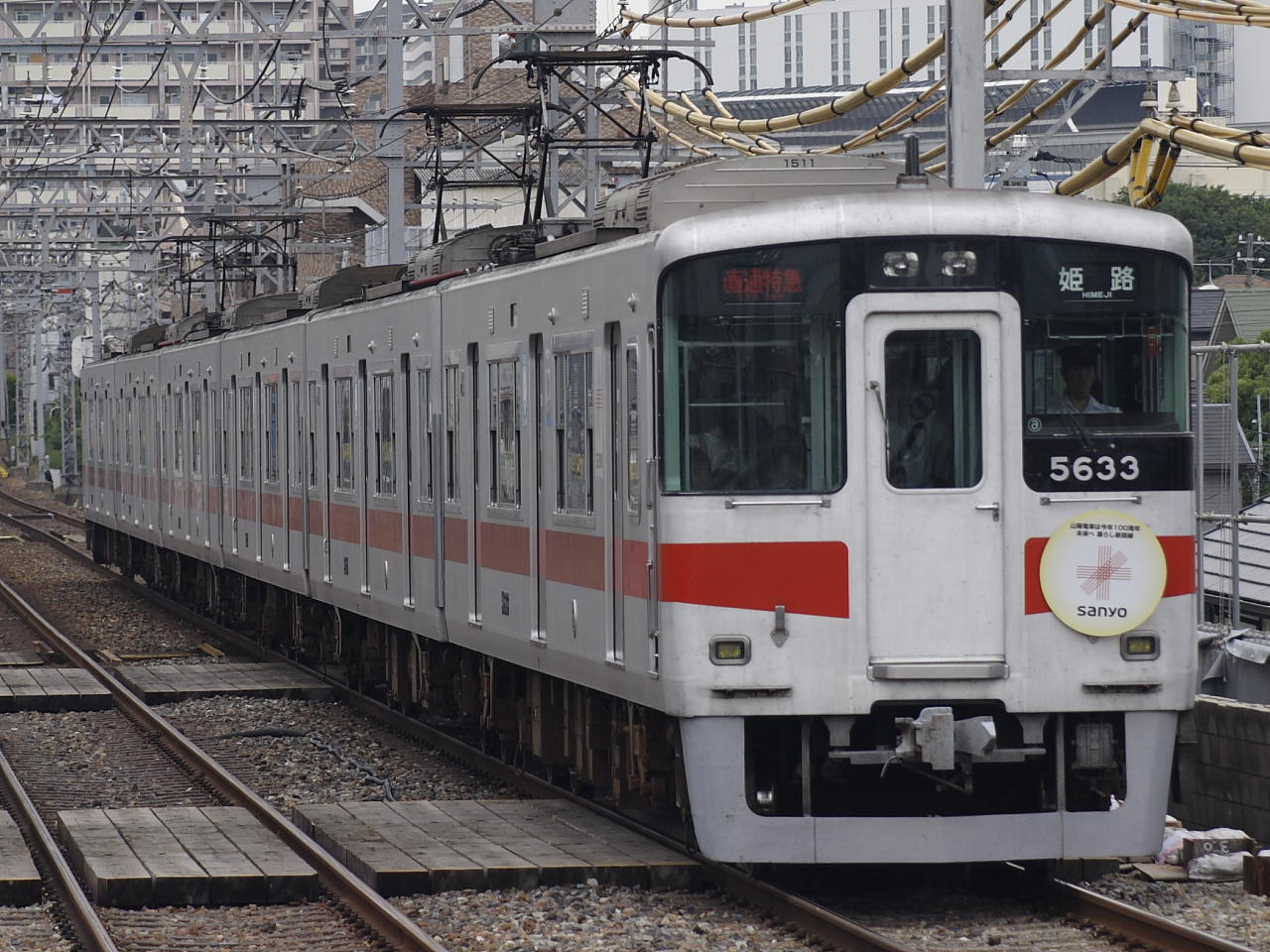
- A Sanyo 5030 series on the Hanshin Main Line, July 2007
- In service: June 1997 – present
- Manufacturer: Kawasaki Heavy Industries
- Number built: 12 vehicles (2 sets)
- Number in service: 12 vehicles (2 sets)
- Formation: 6 cars per trainset
- Operators: Sanyo Electric Railway
- Lines served: Sanyo Electric Railway Main Line; Hanshin Kobe Kosoku Line; Hanshin Main Line

Specifications
- Car body construction: Aluminium alloy
- Car length: 19,000 mm (62 ft 4 in)
- Width: 2,800 mm (9 ft 2 in)
- Height: 4,100 mm (13 ft 5 in)
- Doors: 3 pairs per side
- Maximum speed: 110 km/h (68 mph)
- Traction system: Variable-frequency
- Power output: 170 kW (230 hp) × 4 per motored car
- Acceleration: 2.8 km/(h⋅s) (1.7 mph/s)
- Deceleration: 4.2 km/(h⋅s) (2.6 mph/s) (service); 4.5 km/(h⋅s) (2.8 mph/s) (emergency)
- Electric system(s): 1,500 V DC (overhead wire)
- Current collector(s): Pantograph
- Bogies: W93A (motored); W94A (trailer)
- Safety system(s): ATS
- Coupling system: Knuckle-Type
- Track gauge: 1,435 mm (4 ft 8 1/2 in)

The Sanyo Electric Railway 5030 series (山陽電鉄5030系, San'yō Dentetsu 5030-kei) is an electric multiple unit (EMU) train type operated by the private railway operator Sanyo Electric Railway in Japan since June 1997.

== Design ==
The trains are based on the earlier 5000 series design, and incorporate improvements to reduce noise and facilitate maintenance.

== Formation ==
As of 1 April 2014, two 6-car sets were in service, formed as follows with three motored "M" cars per set.

Designation	Tc1	M1	M2	T	M3	Tc2
Numbering	563x	523x	523x	553x	523x	563x
Weight (t)	28.3	33.7	33.1	24.4	33.7	28.3
Capacity (total/seated)	120/36	130/42	130/42	130/42	130/42	120/36

The M1 and M3 cars are each fitted with two scissors-type pantographs.

== Interior ==
Passenger accommodation consists of transverse seating arranged 2+1 abreast, with seat backs that can be flipped over automatically to face the direction of travel.
