= Meitetsu 5700 series =

Japanese train type

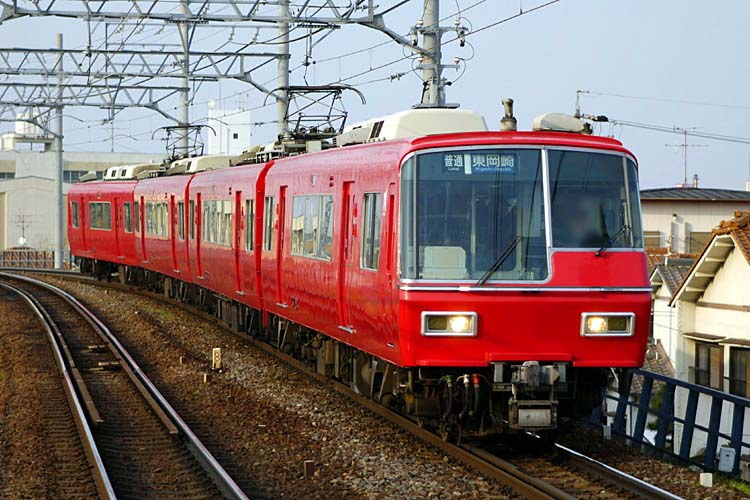
- A Meitetsu 5700 series train
- In service: 1986–2019
- Manufacturer: Nippon Sharyo
- Entered service: 24 June 1986
- Number built: 24 cars (6 sets)
- Number in service: None
- Number scrapped: 24 cars (6 sets)
- Formation: 4 cars per set
- Fleet numbers: 5601, 5701–5705
- Operators: Nagoya Railroad

Specifications
- Car body construction: Steel
- Doors: 2 pairs per side
- Maximum speed: 110 km/h (68 mph)
- Electric system(s): 1,500 V DC
- Current collection: Overhead catenary
- Safety system(s): Meitetsu ATS
- Track gauge: 1,067 mm (3 ft 6 in)

The Meitetsu 5700 series (名鉄5700系) was a commuter electric multiple unit (EMU) train type operated by Nagoya Railroad (Meitetsu) in Japan from 1986 to 2019.

== Design ==
While broadly similar to the 5300 series trains built at the same time using electrical equipment from withdrawn rolling stock, the 5700 series trains were built from new.

== Formations ==
As of 1 April 2015, the 5700 series fleet consists of six four-car sets (5601 and 5701 to 5705). The last train was retired on 30 November 2019, with the introduction of the new 9500 series sets. No 5700 series cars have been preserved.
