= Keio 5000 series (2017) =

Japanese electric multiple unit train type

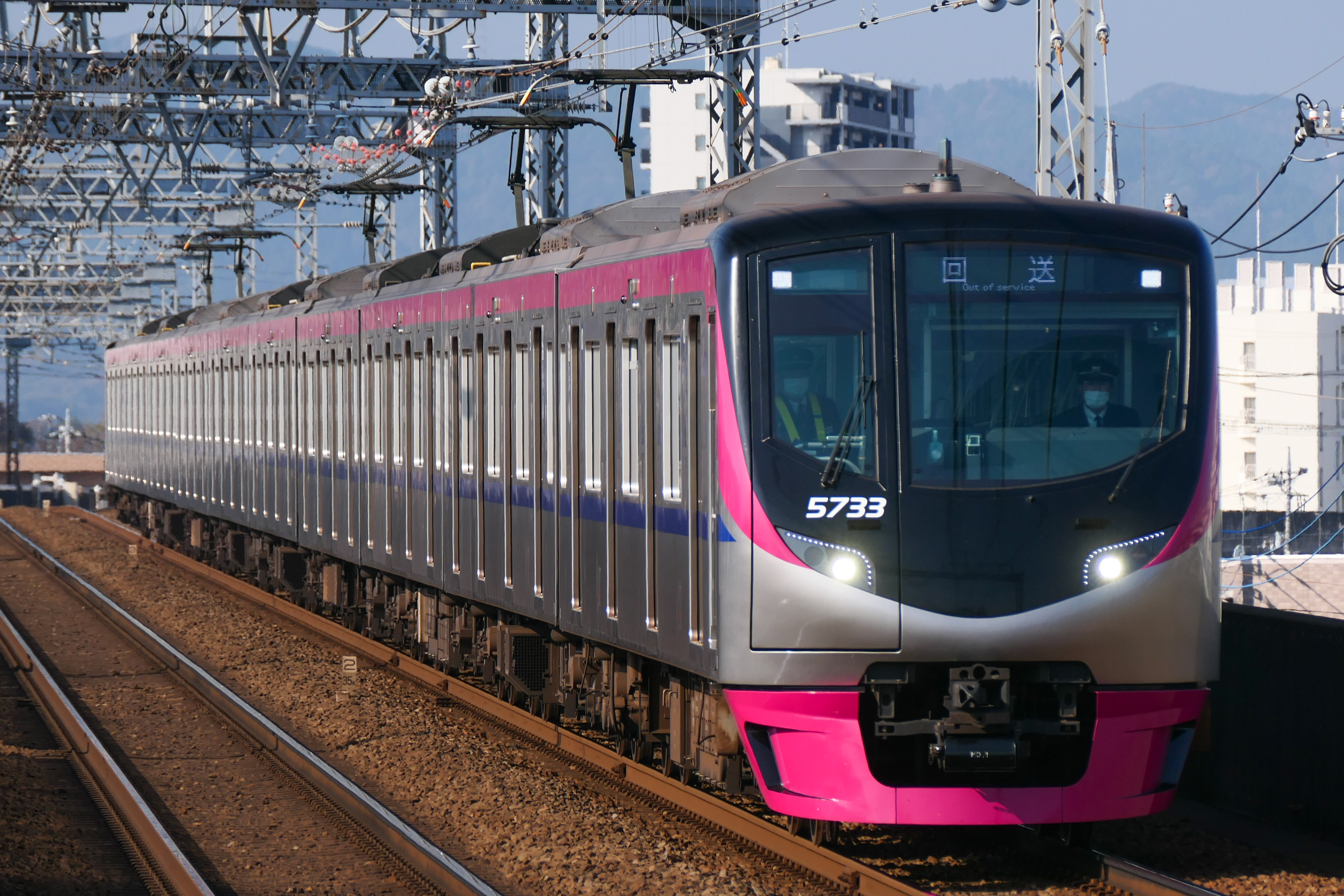
- Set 5733 in November 2021
- Manufacturer: J-TREC
- Designers: Kazuhiko Saito, Taro Shiono
- Built at: Yokohama
- Family name: Sustina
- Constructed: 2017–Present
- Entered service: 29 September 2017
- Number under construction: 20 vehicles (2 sets)
- Number built: 80 vehicles (8 sets)
- Number in service: 80 vehicles (8 sets)
- Formation: 10 cars per trainset
- Fleet numbers: 5731–
- Operator: Keio Corporation
- Lines served: Keio Line; Keio Sagamihara Line; Toei Shinjuku Line

Specifications
- Car body construction: Stainless steel
- Car length: 20,440 mm (67 ft 1 in) (end cars); 20,000 mm (65 ft 7 in) (intermediate cars)
- Width: 2,800 mm (9 ft 2 in)
- Height: 4,090 mm (13 ft 5 in)
- Doors: 4 pairs per side
- Maximum speed: 130 km/h (81 mph) (design)
- Traction system: Hitachi 2-level VVVF (SiC-IGBT hybrid module)
- Traction motors: Hitachi totally enclosed 3-phase squirrel-cage induction motor
- Power output: 150 kW × 4 per motored car
- Acceleration: 3.3 km/(h⋅s) (2.1 mph/s)
- Deceleration: 4.0 km/(h⋅s) (2.5 mph/s) (service); 4.5 km/(h⋅s) (2.8 mph/s) (emergency)
- Electric systems: 1,500 V DC overhead catenary
- Current collection: Single-arm pantograph
- Bogies: TS-1017C (motored); TS-1018CD (trailer)
- Braking system: Regenerative braking with electronically controlled pneumatic brakes
- Track gauge: 1,372 mm (4 ft 6 in)

The Keio 5000 series (京王電鉄5000系) is an electric multiple unit (EMU) commuter train type operated by the private railway operator Keio Corporation in the Tokyo area of Japan since 29 September 2017. A total of six ten-car trainsets were built by J-TREC. The trains feature rotating seats that can be arranged longitudinally for daytime services and in forward-facing transverse pairs for reserved-seat Keio Liner commuter services in the evenings which started on 22 February 2018.

== Design ==
Designed by Kazuhiko Saito and Taro Shiono, the Keio 5000 series is designed to be used in a broad range of scenarios by pursuing high degrees of ride quality. The interior features motifs inspired by the trees of Mount Takao. The train type was a recipient of the Good Design Award in 2017.

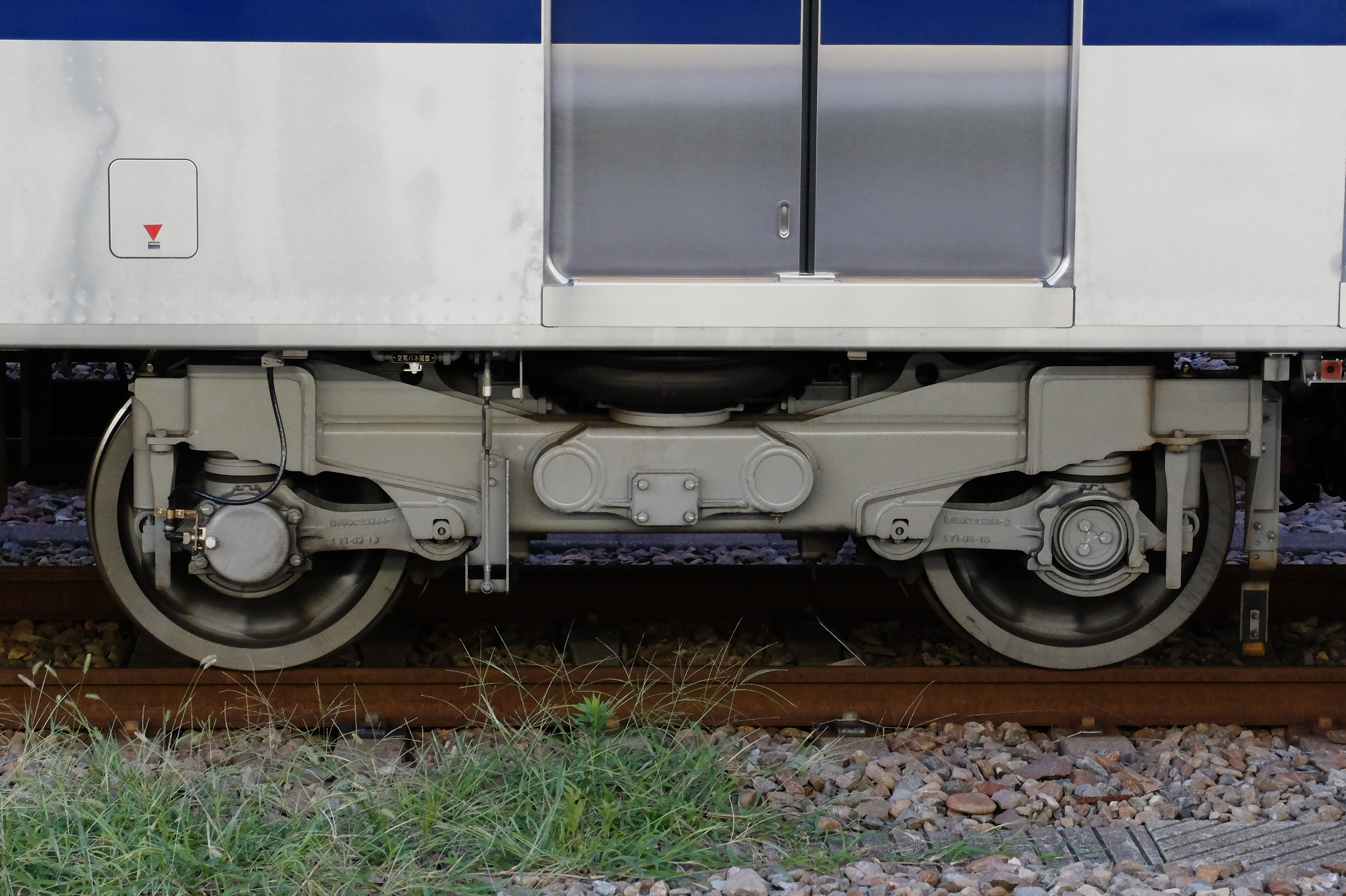
A 5000 series TS-1018CD trailer bogie

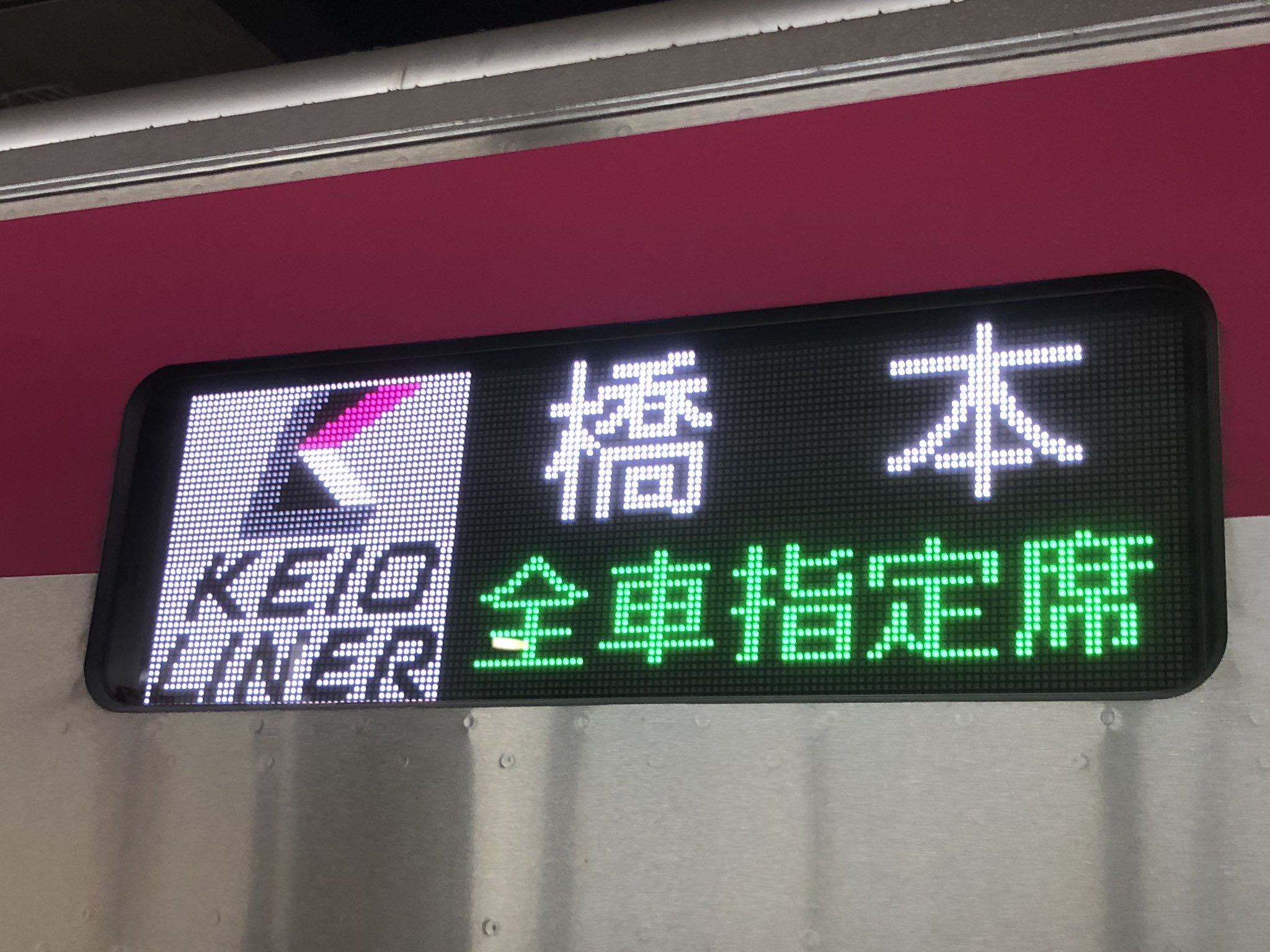
External information display

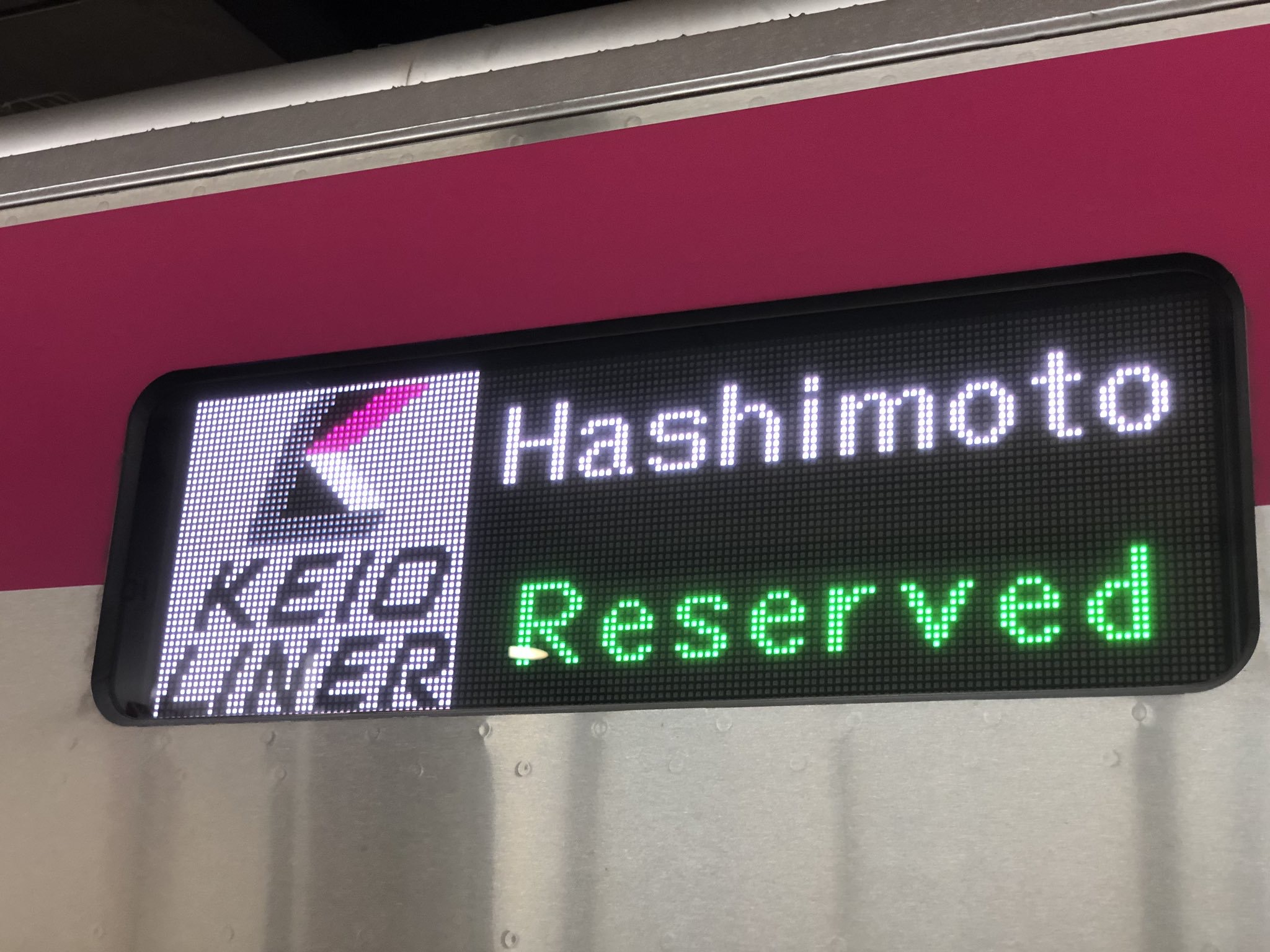
External information display in English

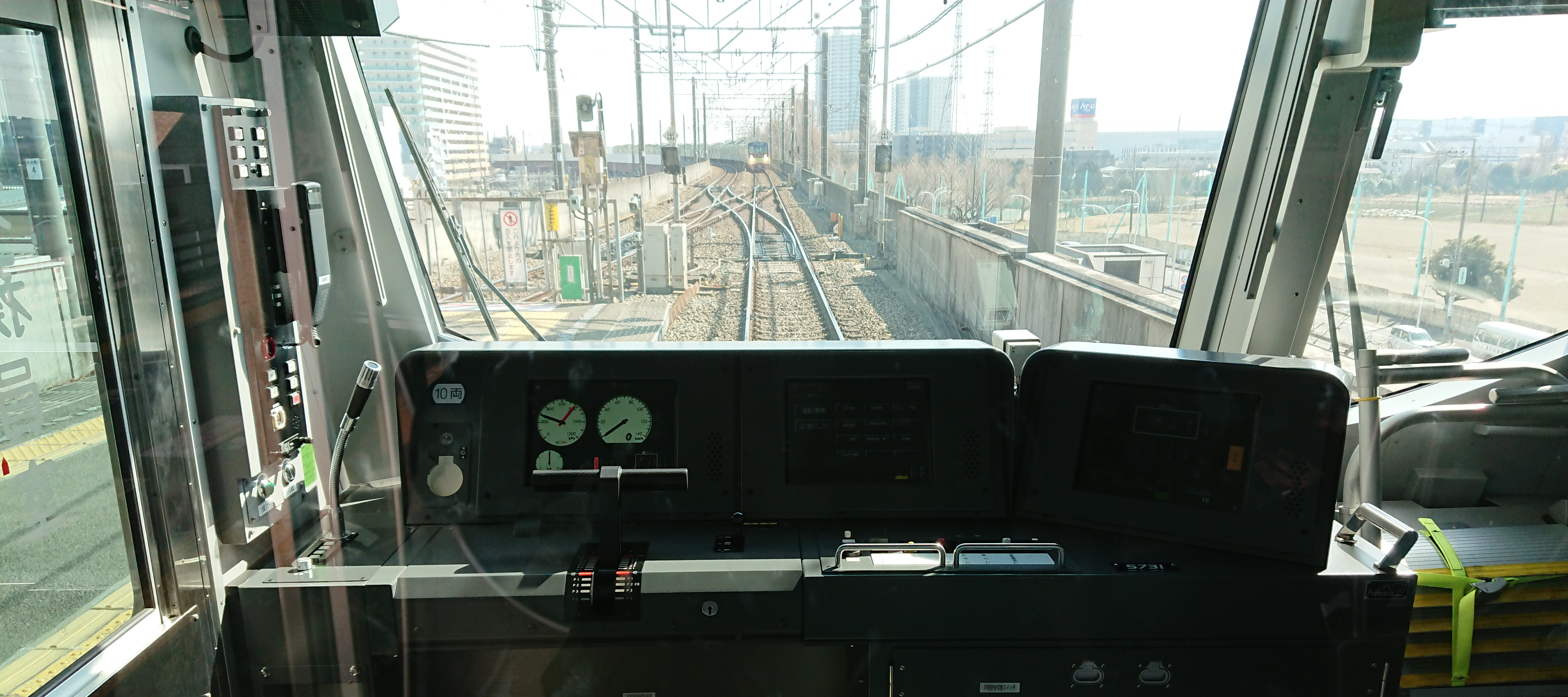
Driver's cab

== Formation ==
The ten-car trains are formed as follows, with six motored ("M") cars and four non-powered trailer ("T") cars, and car 10 at the Shinjuku (eastern) end.

		← Keio Hachioji, Hashimoto Shinjuku →									
Car No.		1	2	3	4	5	6	7	8	9	10
Designation		KuHa 5750 (Tc2)	DeHa 5050 (M2")	DeHa 5000 (M1")	SaHa 5550 (T2)	DeHa 5050 (M2')	DeHa 5000 (M1')	SaHa 5500 (T1)	DeHa 5050 (M2)	DeHa 5000 (M1)	KuHa 5700 (Tc1)
Weight (t)		29.8	35.6	36.3	26.7	34.0	35.4	26.8	35.8	36.3	30.2
Capacity (total/seated)	LONG	119/39	130/45	130/45	130/45	130/45	130/45	130/45	130/45	130/45	119/39
Capacity (total/seated)	CROSS	115/39	126/45	126/45	126/45	126/45	126/45	126/45	126/45	126/45	115/39
Numbering		5781 :	5281 :	5231 :	5581 :	5181 :	5131 :	5531 :	5081 :	5031 :	5731 :

Cars 2, 3, 6, 8, and 9 each have one single-arm pantograph.

== Interior ==
Passenger accommodation consists of rotating pairs of seats that can be arranged in longitudinal configuration for regular daytime services or in transverse forward-facing configuration for reserved-seat evening commuter services from Shinjuku in Tokyo to Keio Hachioji and Hashimoto. LED lighting is used in the interiors, and pairs of LCD passenger information screens are provided both above the doorways and suspended from the ceilings. Free WiFi and AC power sockets are provided. Space for wheelchairs and pushchairs are provided in each car.

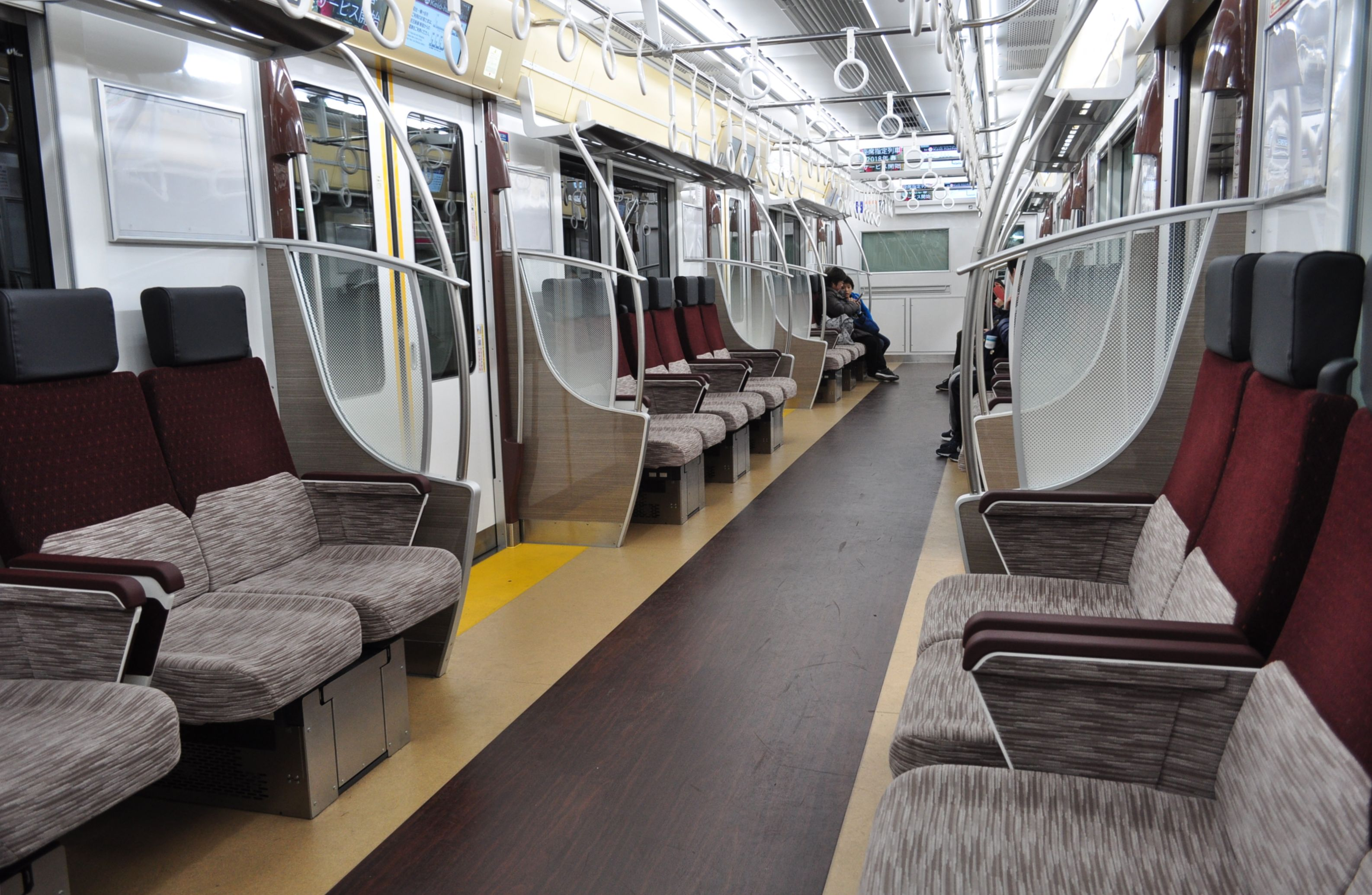
The interior with seats arranged in longitudinal configuration

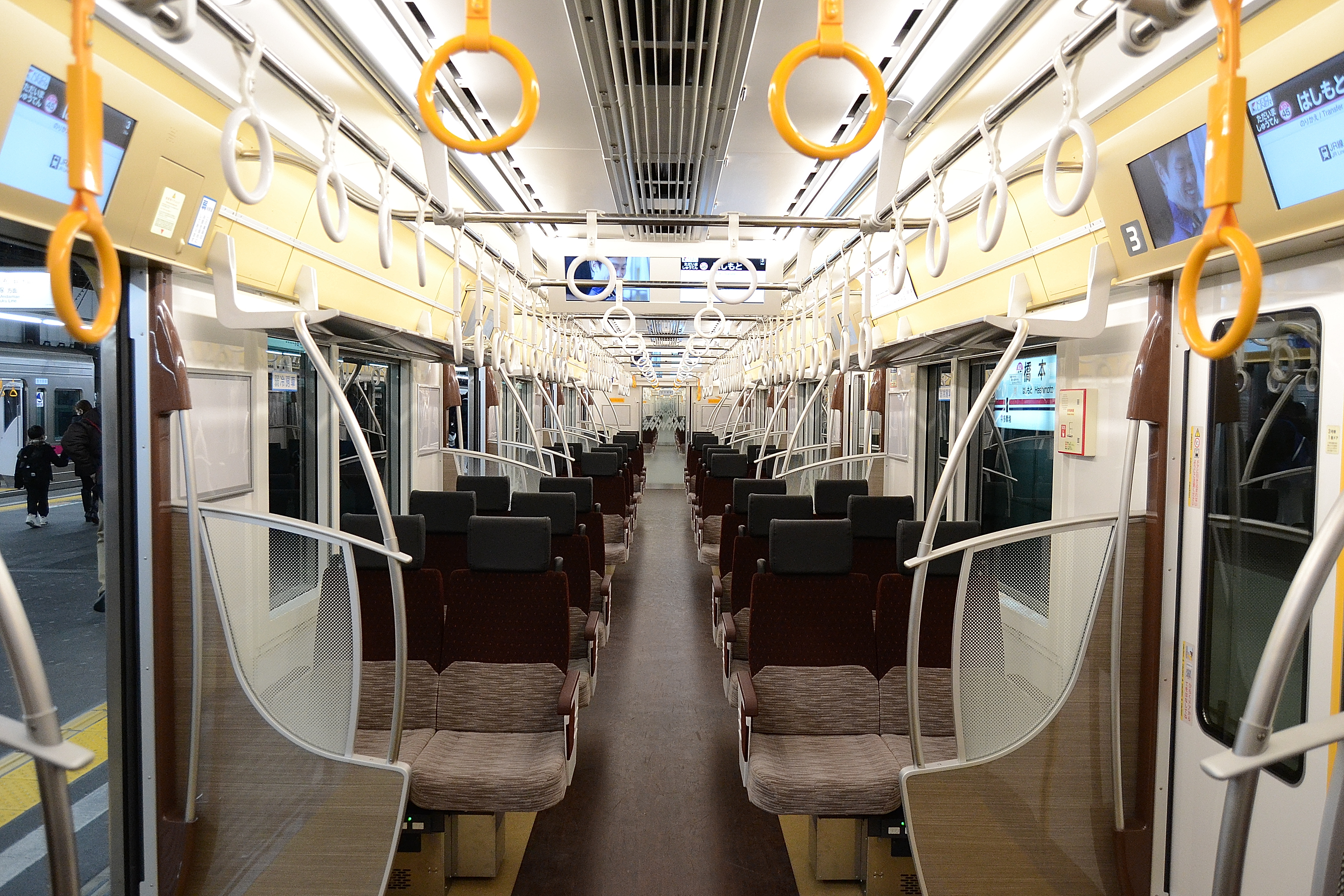
The interior with seats arranged in transverse configuration

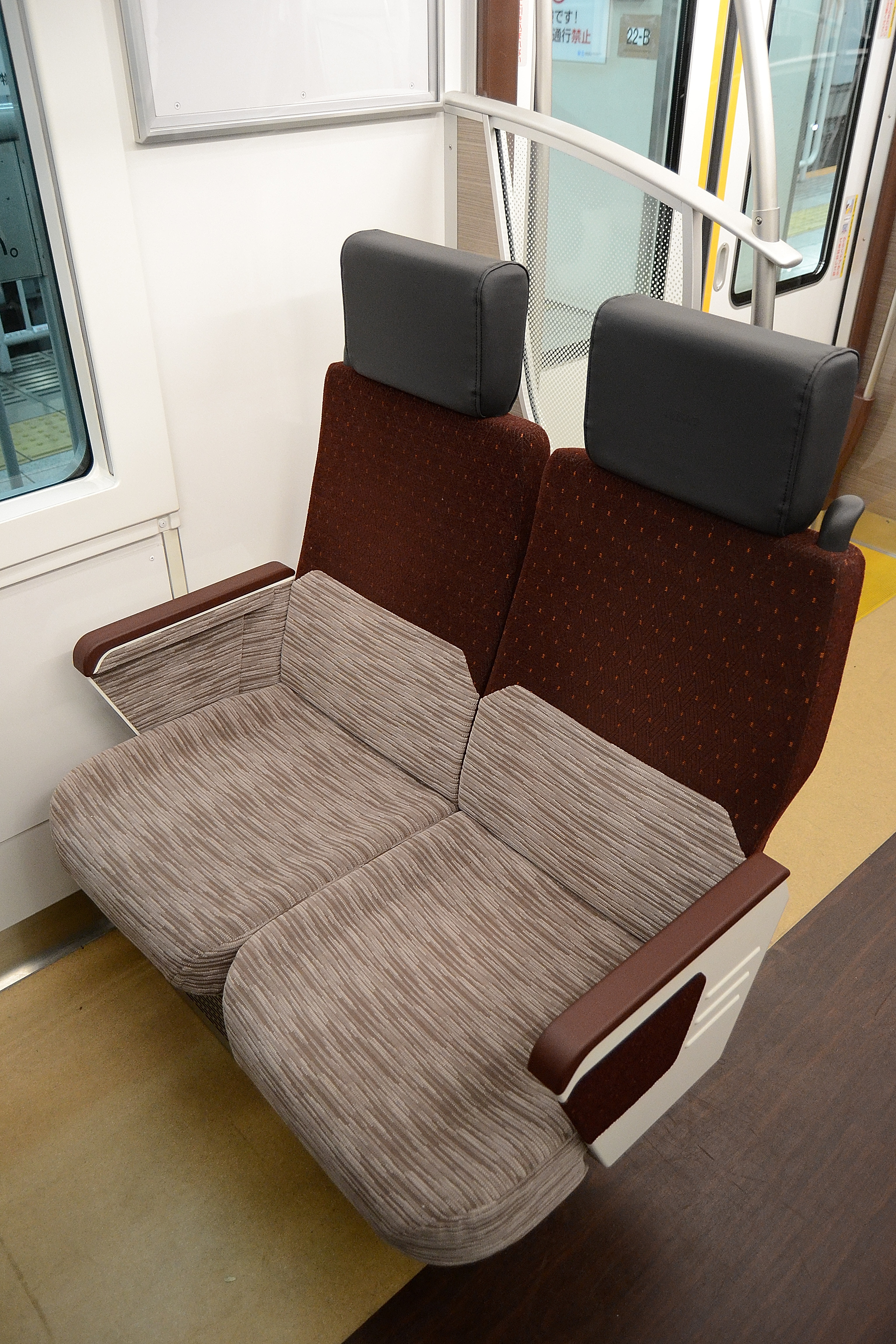
Two-person rotating seat

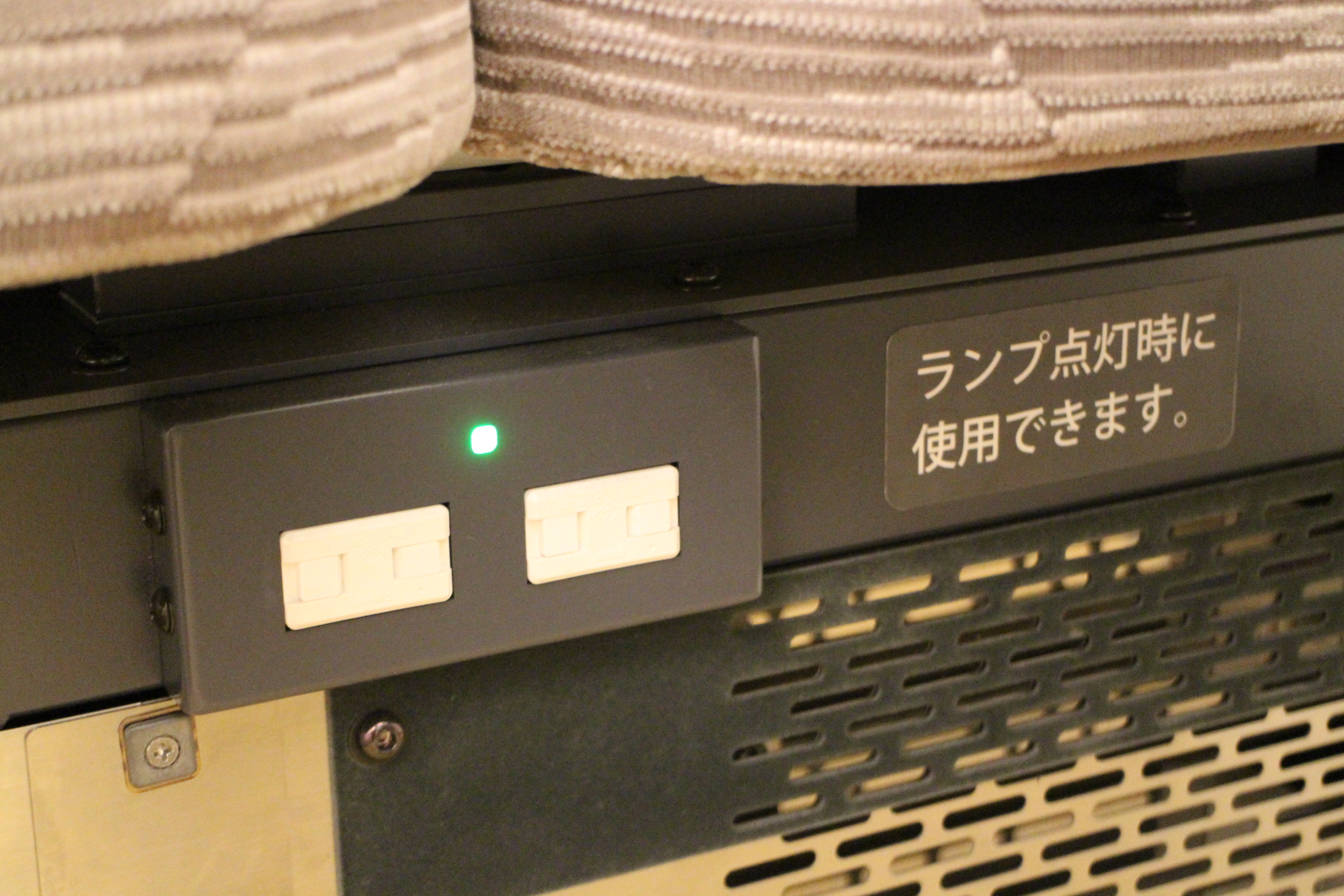
Electrical outlets

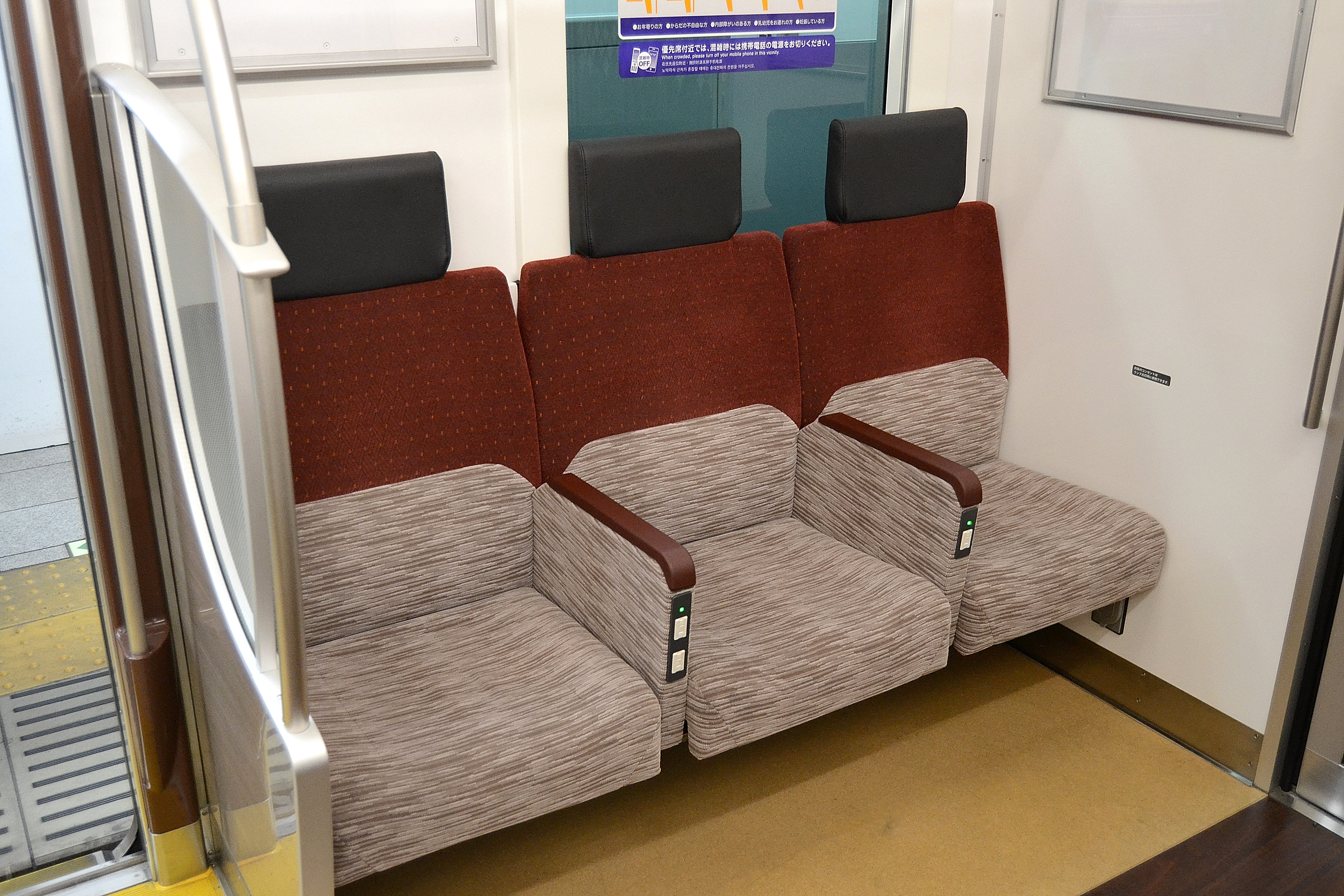
Three-person seating at a car end

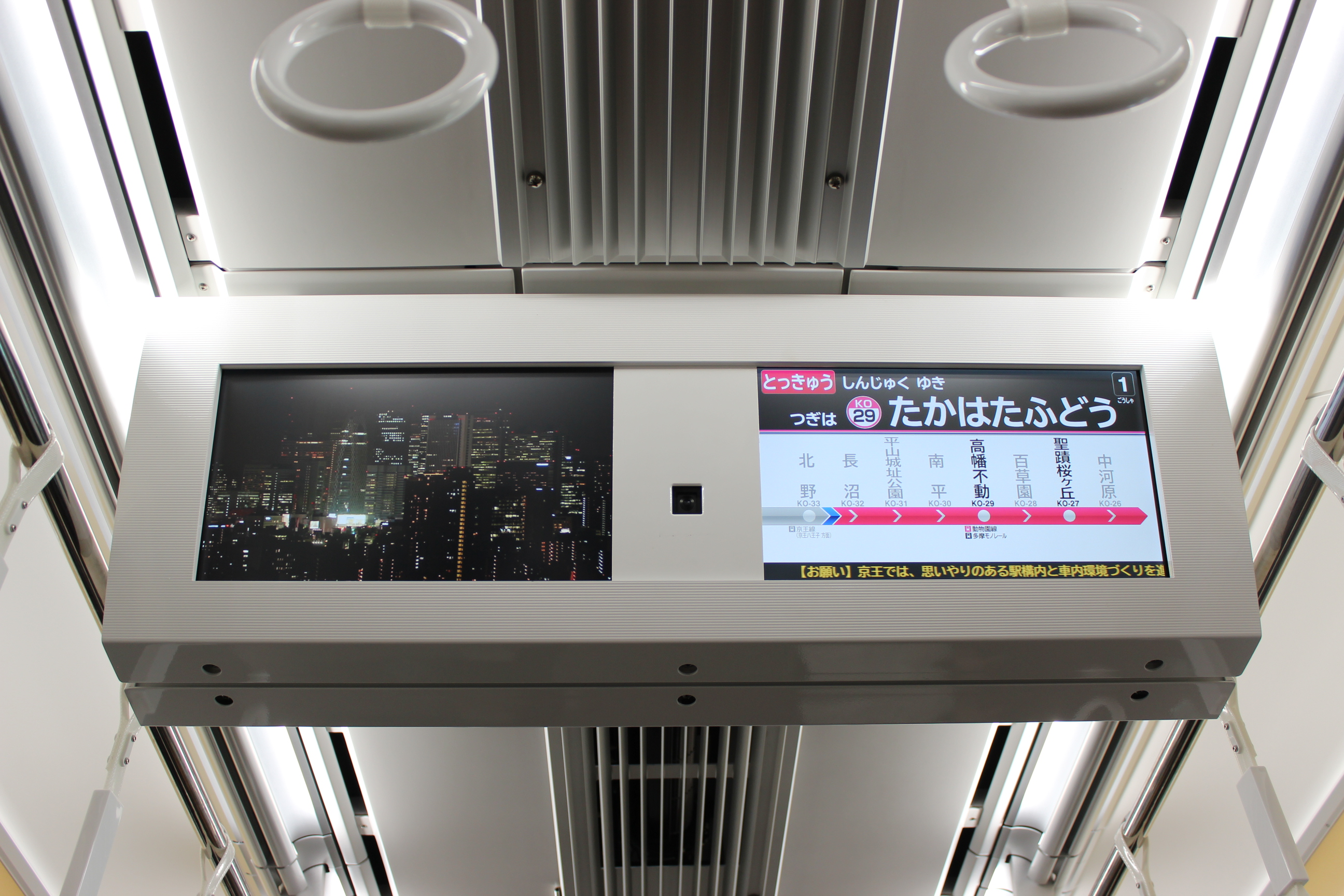
Ceiling-mounted LCD passenger information screens

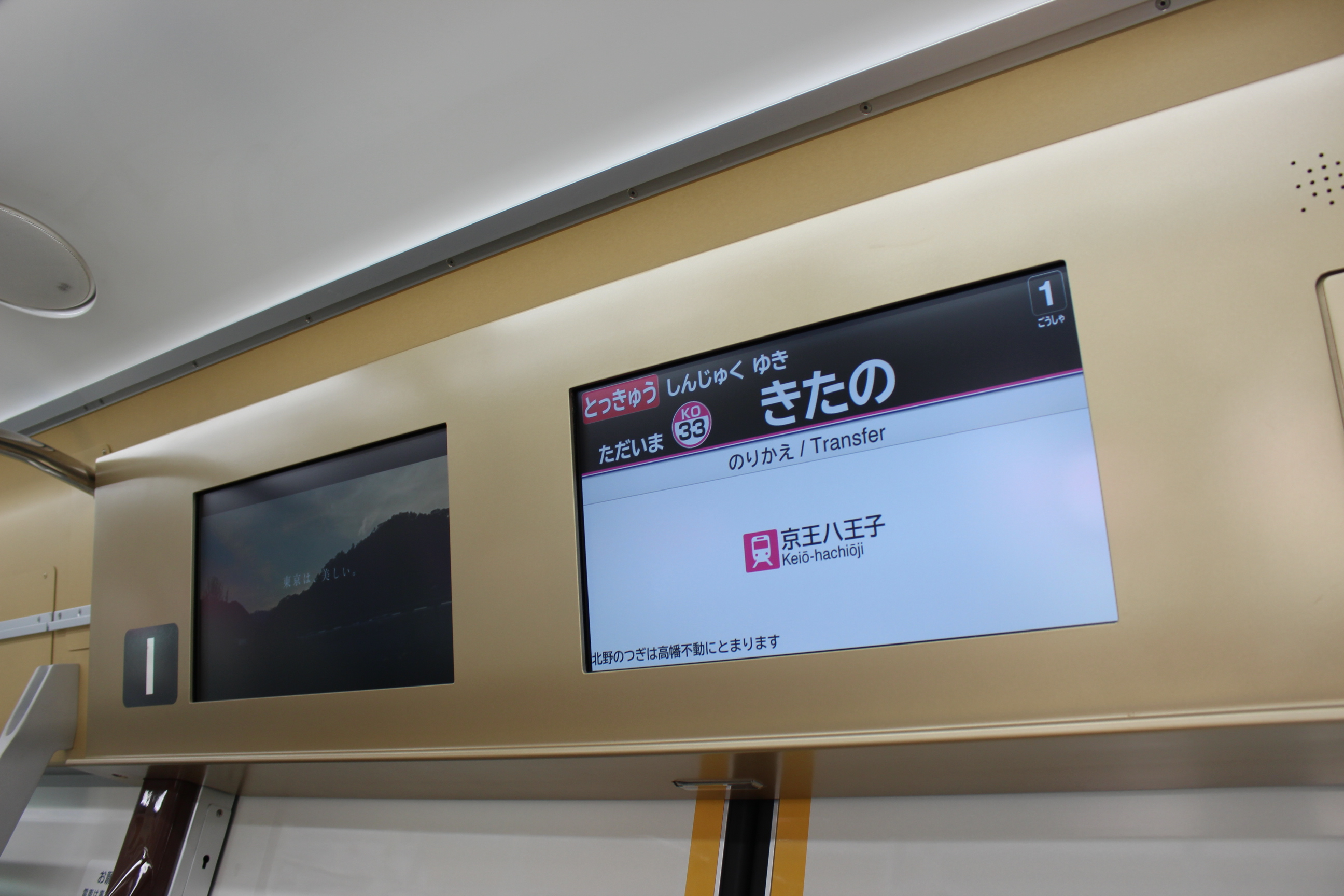
Passenger door-mounted LCD passenger information screens

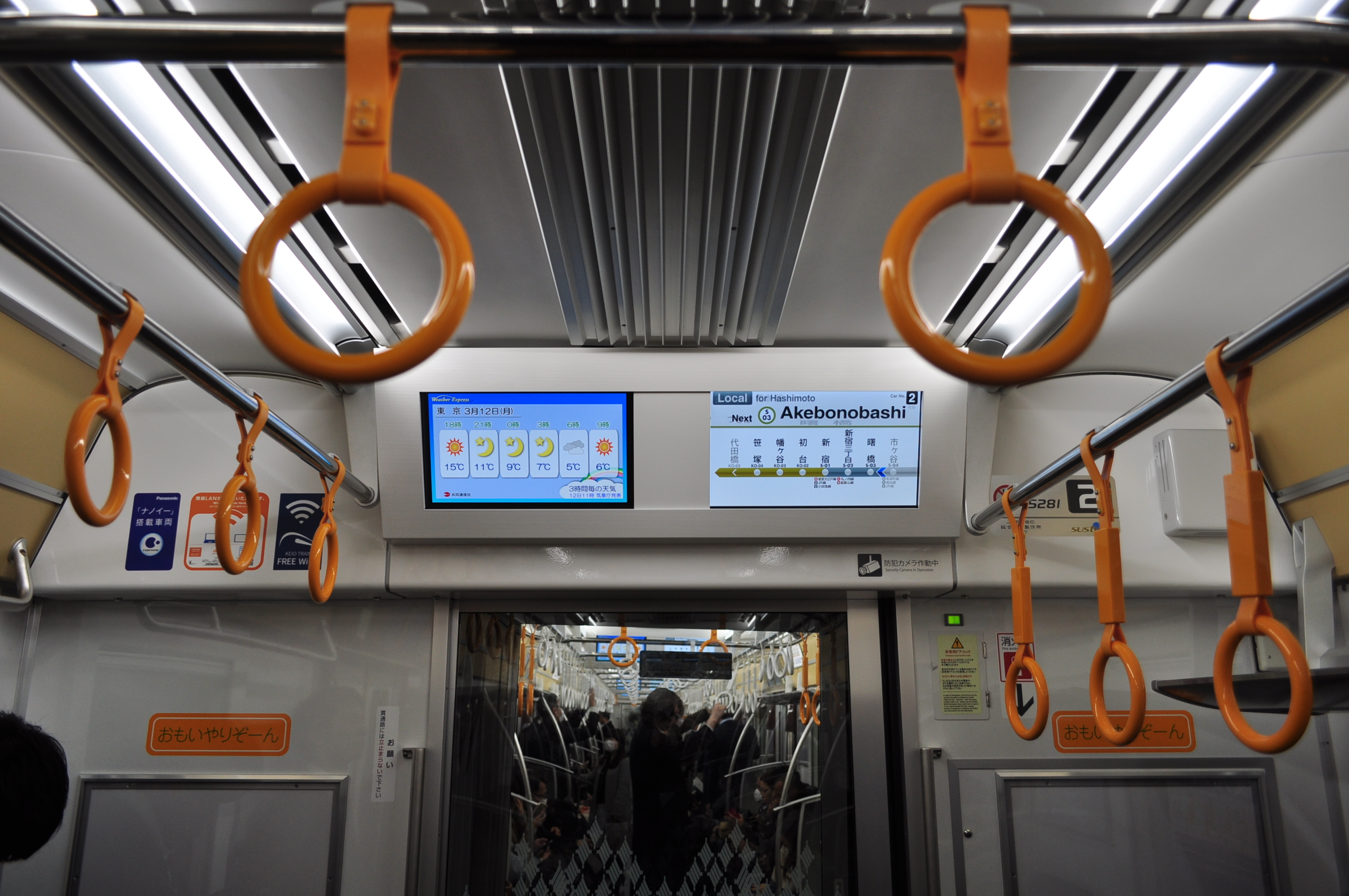
Internal doorway-mounted LCD passenger information screens

== History ==
Details of the new trains were officially announced in March 2016. Between April and May 2017, Keio held a public poll to choose the brand name for the new reserved-seat services starting in spring 2018. The name Keio Liner was announced on 24 January 2018, chosen from the following five candidates.

1. Keio Liner (京王ライナー)
2. Keio Smart Liner (京王スマートライナー)
3. Keio Prime Liner (京王プライムライナー)
4. Luxpress
5. Westar

The fleet of five ten-car 5000 series trainsets was built by Japan Transport Engineering Company ("J-TREC") at a total cost of approximately JPY10 billion.

The first trainset was delivered to Wakabadai Depot from the J-TREC factory in Yokohama in late June 2017, and unveiled to the media on 19 July 2017. It entered revenue service on 29 September 2017. The fifth set was in service by January 2018.

Reserved-seat Keio Liner services from Shinjuku Station commenced on 22 February 2018. Inbound Keio Liner trains to Shinjuku began on 22 February 2019.

The order of a sixth set was announced in April 2019. The set was delivered in December 2019.

=== Future plans ===
Keio plans to upgrade the seats on the 5000 series to include a reclining function. The program aimed to begin revenue operation later in 2022.

The updated seating was installed on a new 7th set. This new set, 5737, debuted on 24 December 2022.

On 10 May 2024, Keio announced that as part of its fiscal 2024 capital investment plan, two more 5000 series sets are scheduled to be delivered to boost the frequency of Keio Liner services.

== Build histories ==
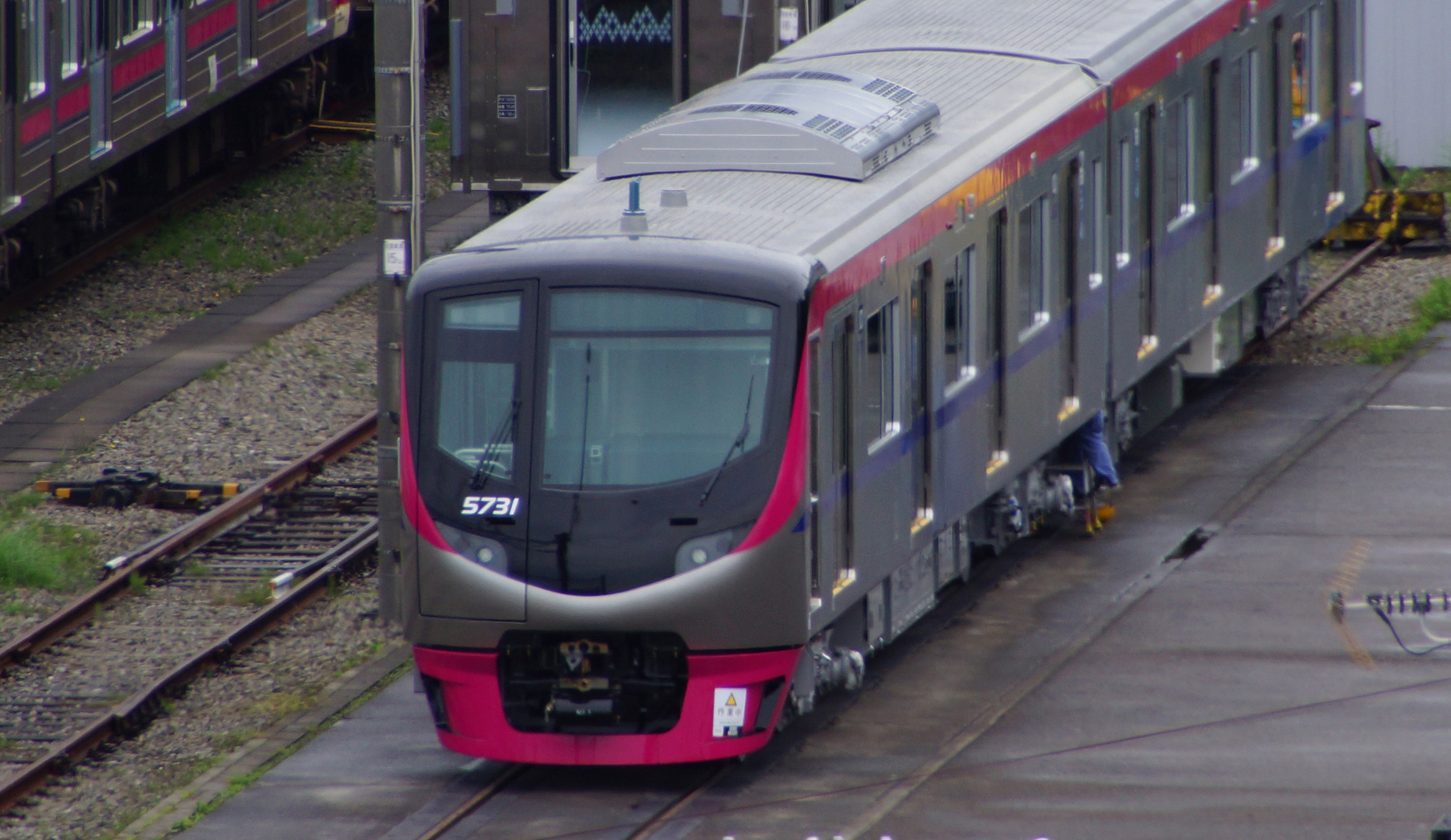
Cars of the first set delivered, 5731, in June 2017

The manufacturers and delivery dates for the fleet are as shown below.

Set No.	Date delivered
5731	30 June 2017
5732	15 September 2017
5733	2017
5734	
5735	
5736	December 2019
5737	24 December 2022
5738	January 2024

== See also ==
- Seibu 40000 series, a Seibu Railway commuter EMU type that also features rotating longitudinal/transverse seating
- Tobu 50090 series and 70090 series, Tobu Railway commuter EMU types that also feature rotating longitudinal/transverse seating
- Keikyu N1000 series, a Keikyu commuter EMU type that features rotating transverse seating (batches 20 and 21 only)
- Kintetsu 5800 series, the first EMU commuter trains delivered with rotating longitudinal/transverse seating
- Kintetsu 5820 series, a similar type with changing seat configurations operating for Kintetsu Railway, the curators of the design
