= Meitetsu 5300 series =

Japanese train type

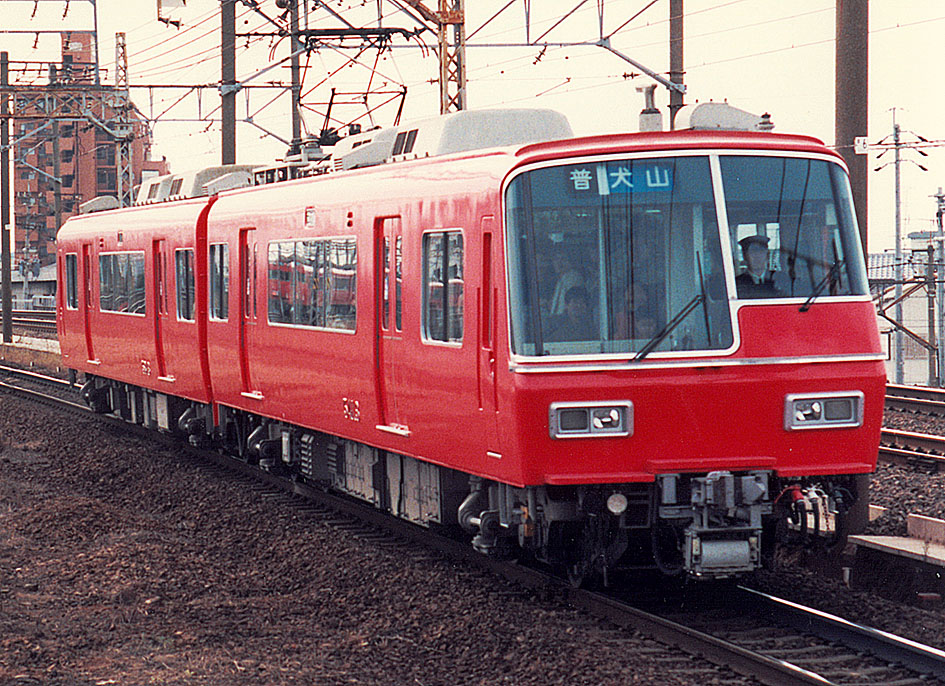
- A Meitetsu 5300 series two-car train
- In service: 1986 – 2019
- Manufacturer: Nippon Sharyo
- Number built: 42 cars (12 sets)
- Number in service: None
- Number preserved: None
- Number scrapped: 42 cars (12 sets)
- Formation: 2 or 4 cars per set
- Fleet numbers: 5301-5309
- Operator: Nagoya Railroad

Specifications
- Car body construction: Steel
- Doors: 2 pairs per side
- Maximum speed: 110 km/h (68 mph)
- Traction system: Resistor control
- Electric systems: 1,500 V DC (overhead catenary)
- Safety system: Meitetsu ATS
- Track gauge: 1,067 mm (3 ft 6 in)

The Meitetsu 5300 series (名鉄5300系) was a commuter electric multiple unit (EMU) train type operated by Nagoya Railroad (Meitetsu) in Japan from 1986 until 2019.

== Design ==
While broadly similar to the 5700 series trains introduced at the same time, the 5300 series trains were built using new bodies combined with electrical equipment from former 5000 and 5200 series EMUs. The last set was sent for scrap on 23 December 2019. No 5300 series cars have been preserved.

== Formations ==
As of 1 April 2015, the 5300 series fleet consists of four four-car sets (5304 to 5308) and one two-car set (5309).
