= Odakyu 5000 series (2019) =

Japanese train type

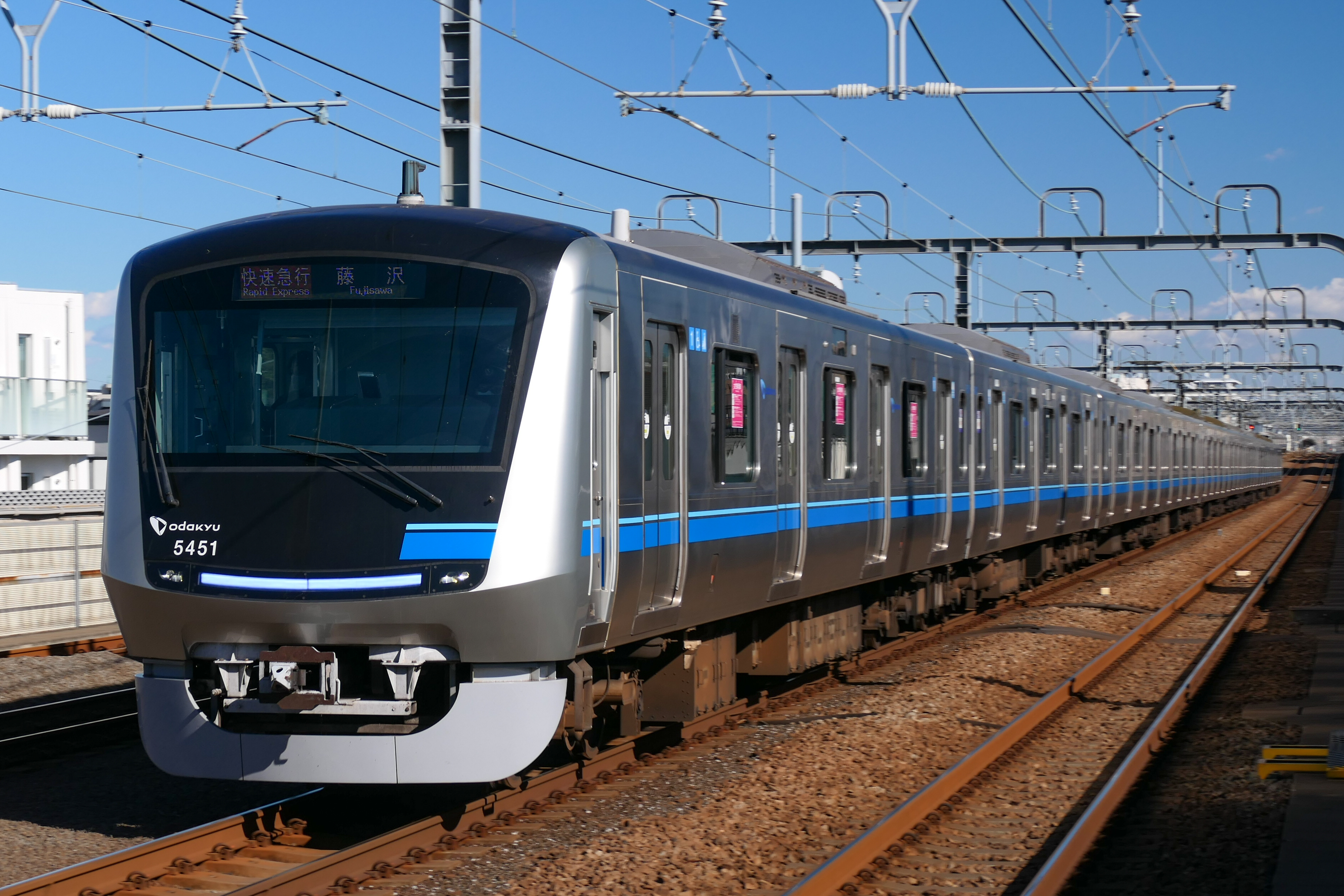
- A 5000 series train in November 2021
- In service: March 2020 – Present
- Manufacturers: Kawasaki, J-TREC, Nippon Sharyo
- Constructed: 2019–
- Entered service: 26 March 2020
- Number under construction: 30 vehicles (3 sets)
- Number built: 100 vehicles (10 sets)
- Number in service: 100 vehicles (10 sets)
- Formation: 10 cars per set
- Capacity: 144 (end cars); 155 (intermediate cars)
- Operator: Odakyu Electric Railway
- Lines served: Odakyu Odawara Line; Odakyu Enoshima Line; Odakyu Tama Line

Specifications
- Car length: 20.4 m (66 ft 11 in) (end cars); 20 m (65 ft 7 in) (intermediate cars)
- Width: 2.9 m (9 ft 6 in)
- Doors: 4 pairs per side
- Traction system: Mitsubishi Electric MAP-194-15V330 SiC-MOSFET–VVVF inverter PG sensorless vector control
- Traction motors: Mitsubishi MB-5157-A2 190 kW (250 hp) totally enclosed fan-cooled 3-phase AC induction motor
- Acceleration: 0.92 m/s^{2} (2.1 mph/s)
- Deceleration: 1.1 m/s^{2} (2.5 mph/s) (service); 1.3 m/s^{2} (2.9 mph/s) (emergency)
- Electric systems: 1,500 V DC overhead catenary
- Current collection: Pantograph
- UIC classification: 2′2′+Bo′Bo′+2′2′+Bo′Bo′+Bo′Bo′+2′2′+2′2′+Bo′Bo′+Bo′Bo′+2′2′
- Safety system: D-ATS-P
- Track gauge: 1,067 mm (3 ft 6 in)

The Odakyu 5000 series (小田急5000形, Odakyū 5000-gata) is a commuter electric multiple unit (EMU) train type operated by the private railway operator Odakyu Electric Railway in Japan since 26 March 2020.

== Formation ==
The trains are formed as follows, with ten cars per set.

Car No.	1	2	3	4	5	6	7	8	9	10
Designation	Tc1	M1	M2	T1	T2	M3	M4	T3	M5	Tc2
Numbering	KuHa 5050	DeHa 5000	DeHa 5100	SaHa 5150	SaHa 5250	DeHa 5200	DeHa 5300	DeHa 5350	DeHa 5400	KuHa 5450
Capacity (total)	144	155	155	155	155	155	155	155	155	144

All motor cars except M5 have one single-arm pantograph.

== Interior ==
Seating accommodation consists of longitudinal seating. The interior also features a warm color palette, wood flooring, air purifiers, LED lighting, security cameras, and wheelchair spaces.

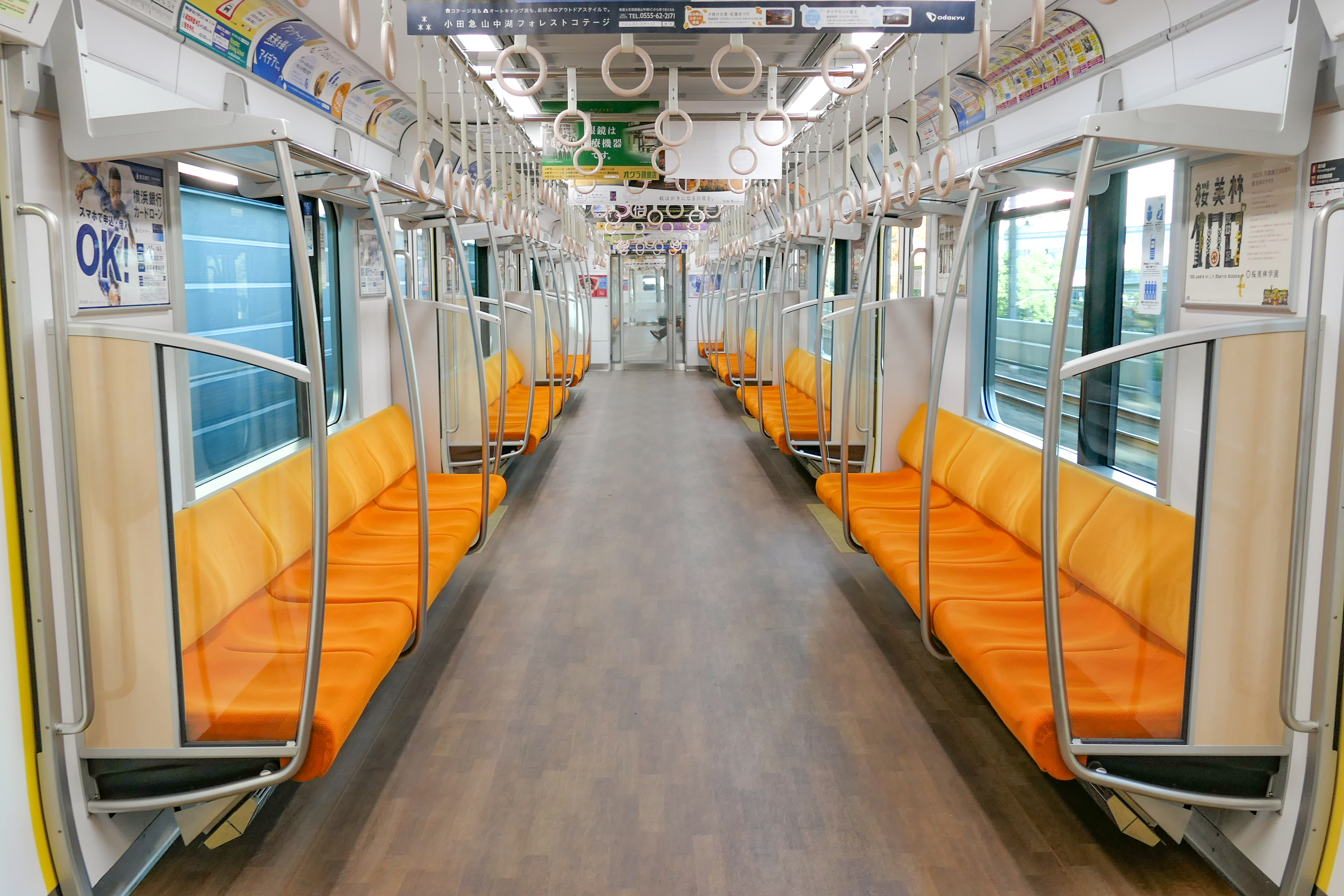
Interior

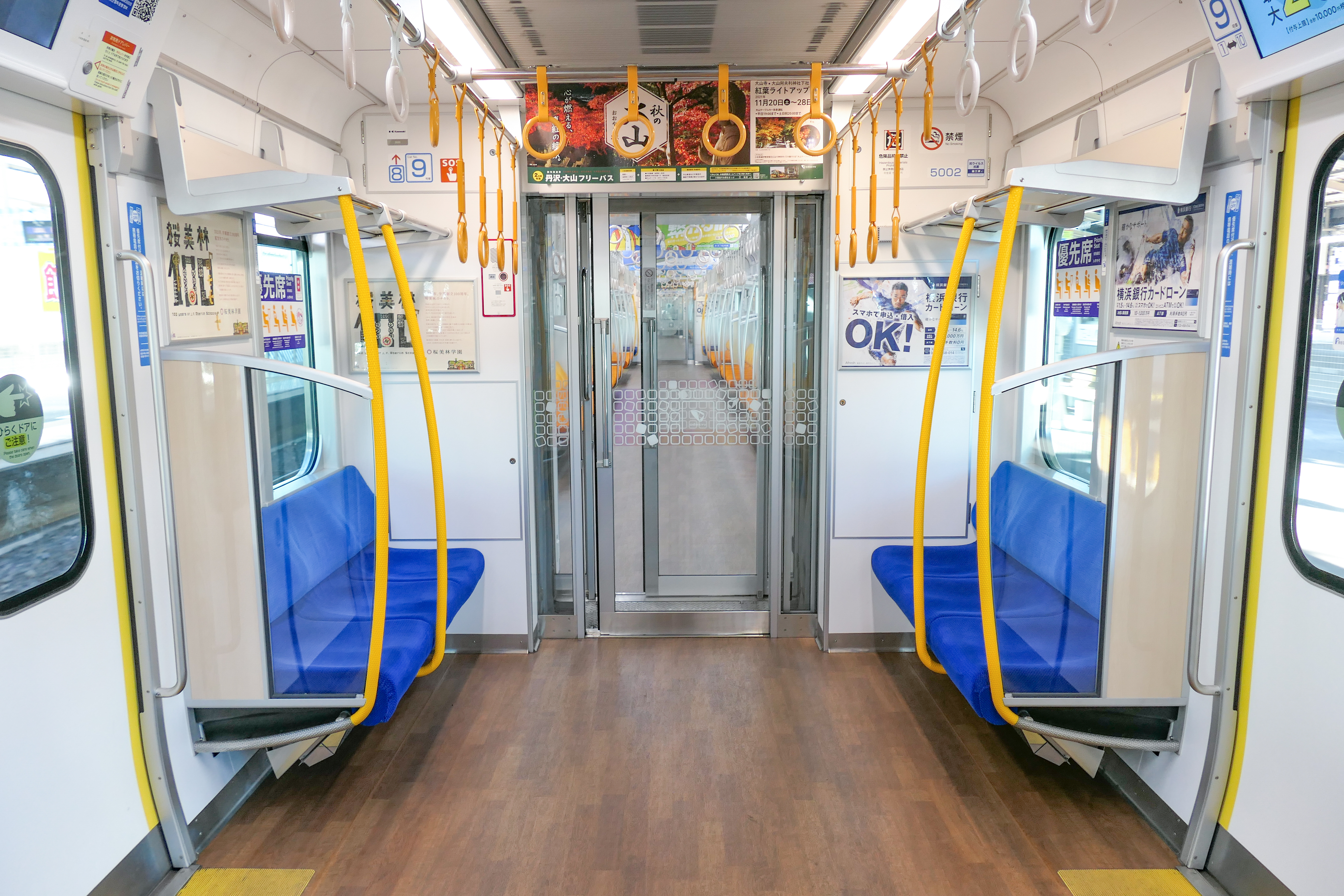
Priority seating

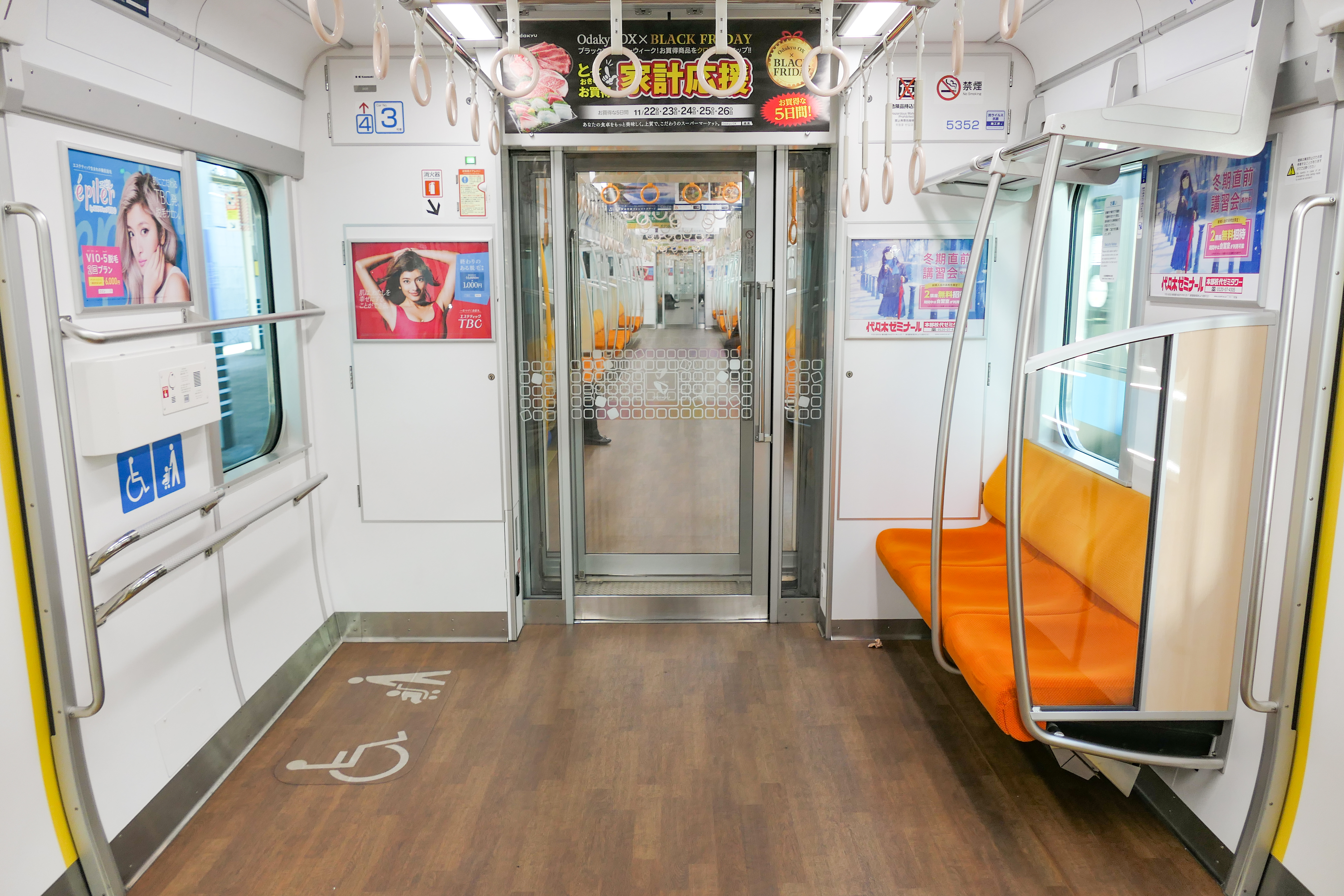
Wheelchair space

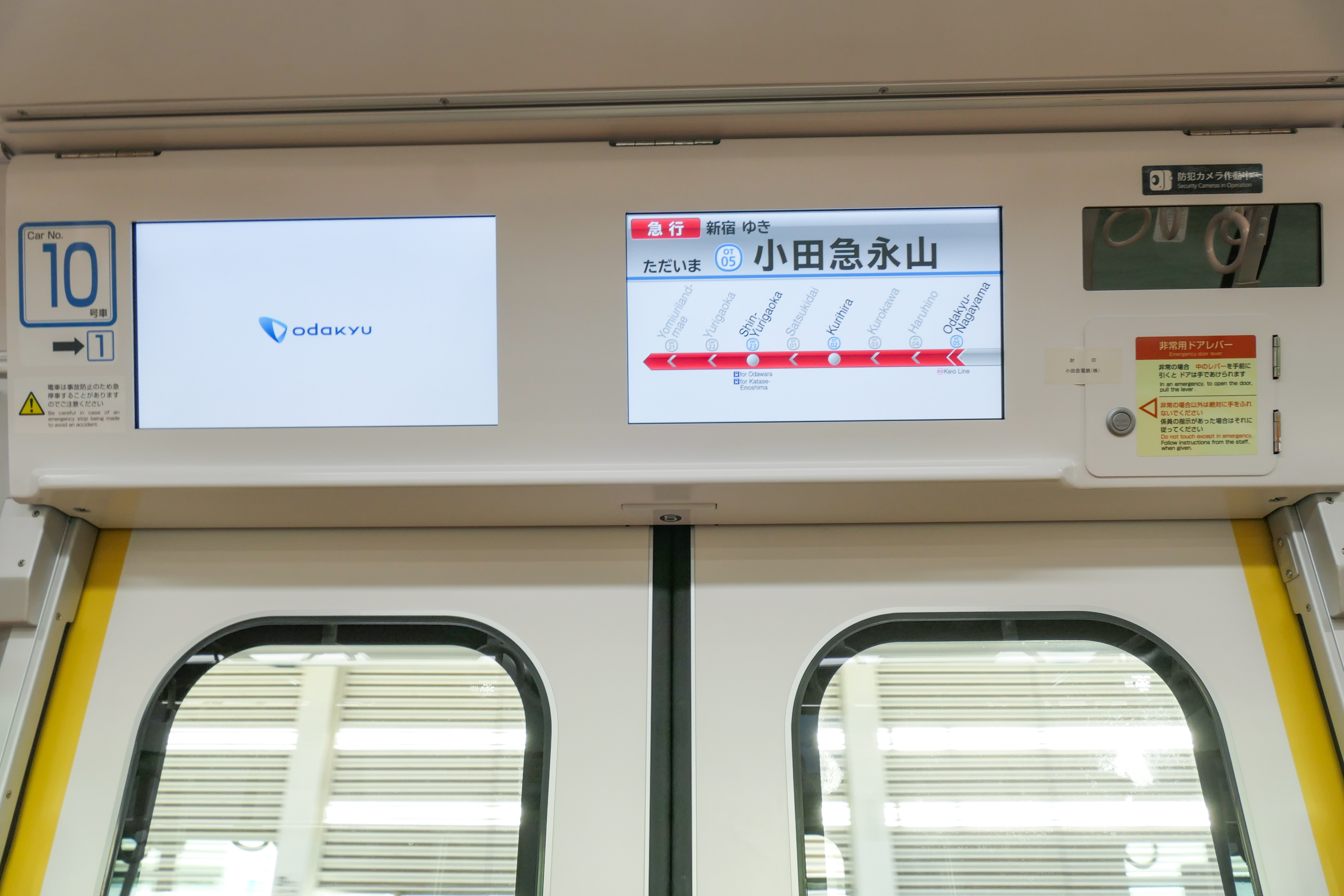
LCD passenger information display

== Technical specifications ==
The trains use SiC–VVVF technology. The bogies are built by Nippon Sharyo.

== History ==
Odakyu announced initial details of the trains on 26 April 2019. Five sets were built by Kawasaki Heavy Industries, two were built by Japan Transport Engineering Company, and three were built by Nippon Sharyo. The first train was revealed to the press on 11 November 2019. The trains entered service on 26 March 2020.

Another batch consisting of three trainsets will be constructed according to Odakyu Railway's 2022 capital investment plan. The new trainsets are set to replace three older Odakyu 1000 series trainsets.
