= Meitetsu 5000 series (1955) =

Japanese train type

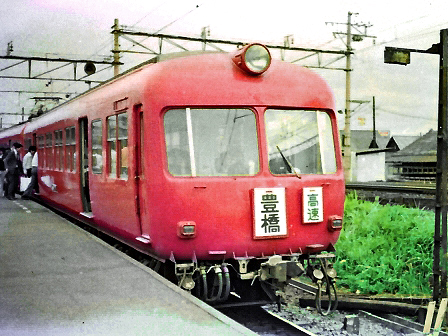
- 5000 series at Jingū-mae Station, May 1977
- In service: 1955–1986
- Number built: 30 vehicles
- Number in service: 0 vehicles
- Formation: 4 cars per trainset
- Operators: Nagoya Railroad

Specifications
- Car body construction: Steel
- Doors: 2 per side
- Traction system: Resistor control
- Transmission: Cardan Driveshaft (1st train to have that type of driveshaft introduced in Meitetsu)
- Electric system(s): 1,500 V DC
- Current collector(s): Overhead wire
- Track gauge: 1,067 mm (3 ft 6 in)

The Meitetsu 5000 series (名鉄5000系) was an EMU type operated by Nagoya Railroad (Meitetsu) in Japan between 1955 and 1986.

== History ==
The fleet was withdrawn by 1986, donating bogies and electrical equipment to the later 5300 series EMUs.

== Interior ==
The trains featured flip-over transverse seating.
