= Sanyo 5000 series =

Japanese train type

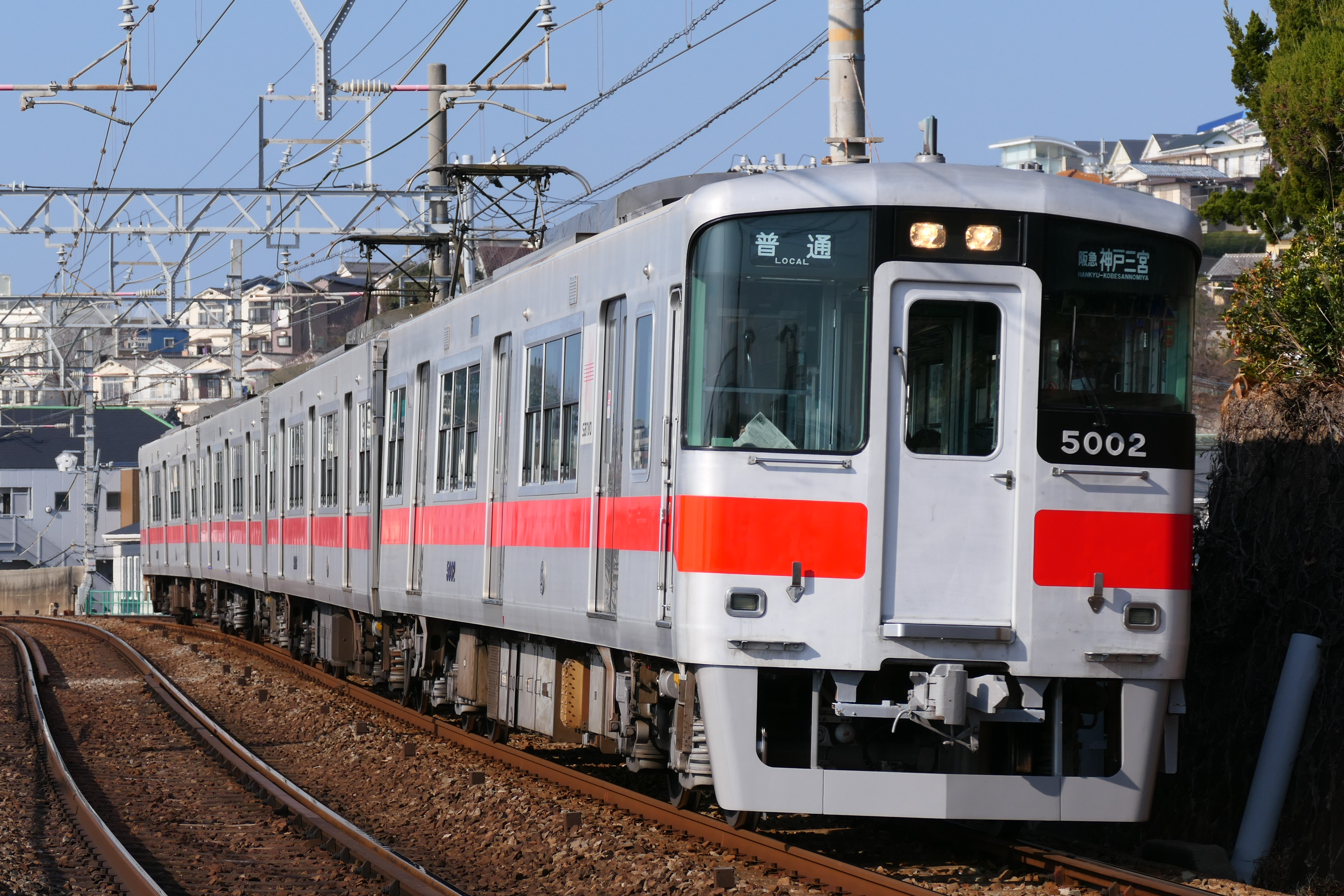
- A Sanyo 5000 series train in January 2021
- Manufacturer: Kawasaki Heavy Industries
- Constructed: 1986–1995
- Entered service: 1986
- Refurbished: 2018
- Number built: 60 vehicles
- Number in service: 54 vehicles
- Number scrapped: 4 vehicles (accident damage)
- Formation: 4 & 6 cars per trainset
- Operators: Sanyo Electric Railway

Specifications
- Car body construction: Aluminium alloy
- Doors: 3 pairs per side
- Traction system: Field-excitation, Variable frequency (IGBT/SiC Hybrid module)(Car 2 of refurbished sets)
- Electric system(s): 1,500 V DC overhead lines
- Current collection: Pantograph
- Bogies: KW-35B / KW-36B; KW93 / KW94 (cars built in 1990)
- Track gauge: 1,435 mm (4 ft 8 1/2 in)

The Sanyo Electric Railway 5000 series (山陽電鉄5000系, San'yō Dentetsu 5000-kei) is an electric multiple unit (EMU) train type operated by the private railway operator Sanyo Electric Railway in Japan since 1986.

== Formation ==
The trains are formed as four-car and six-car sets.

=== Refurbished set ===
The refurbished set is formed as follows.

Designation	Tc	M	T	M	M	Tc
Numbering	5702	5802	5502	5235	5252	5602

The M cars 5802 and 5252 are fitted with pantographs.

== Interior ==
The interior consists of semi-transverse seating. The interior of the refurbished sets consists of longitudinal seating in the cars 1, 2, 5 and 6, and transverse seating in the cars 3 and 4.

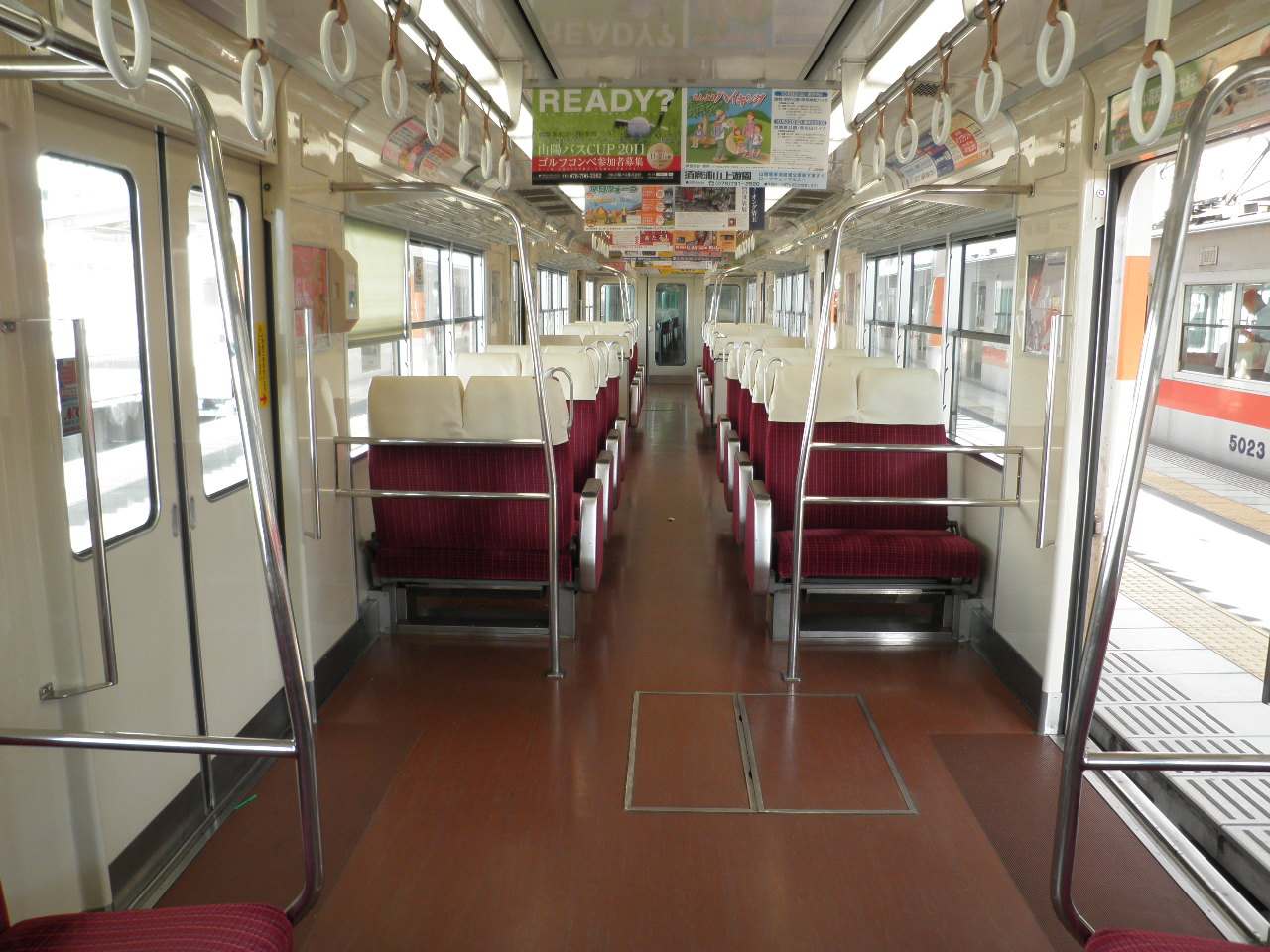
2+2 seating in September 2011

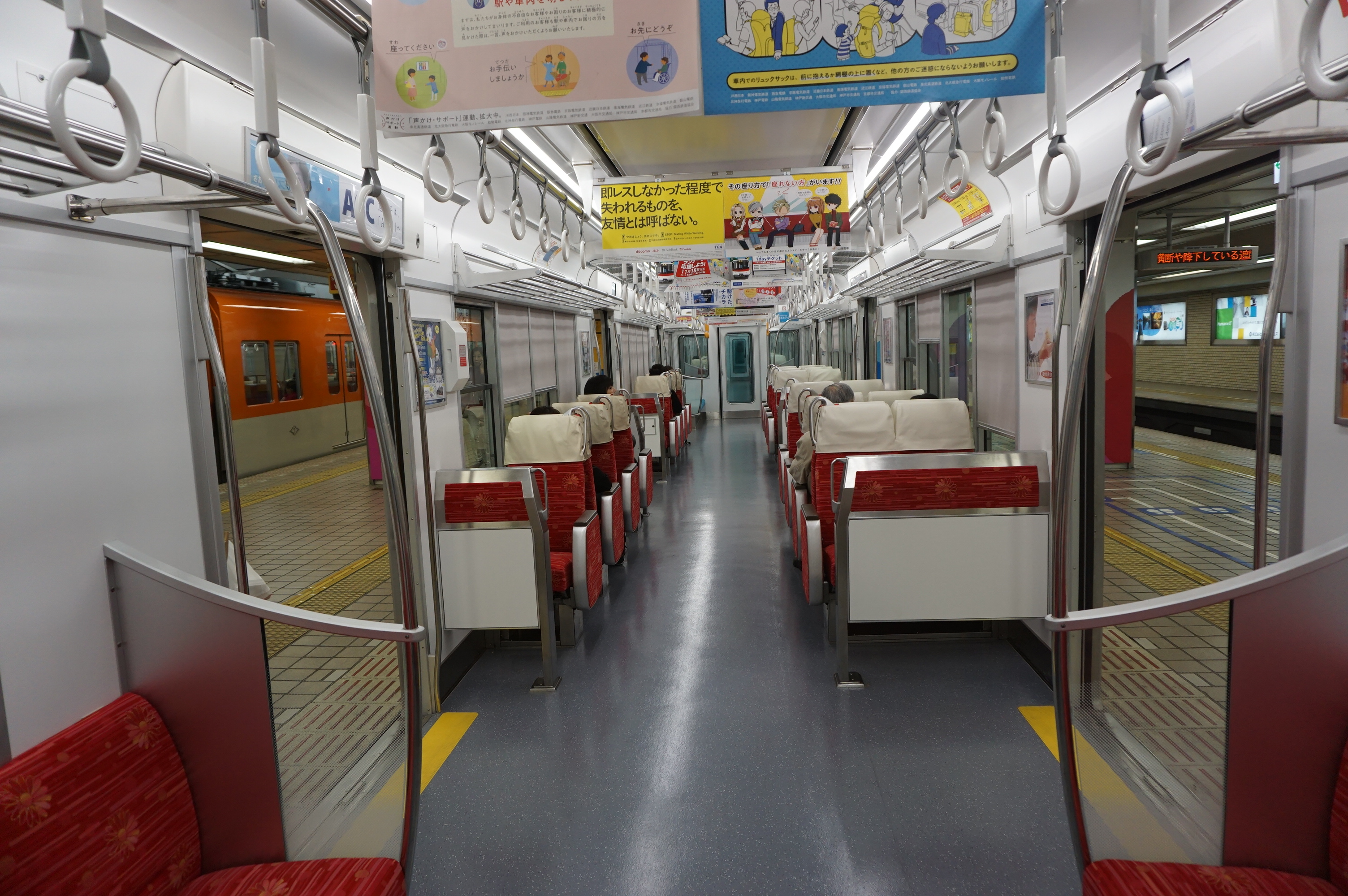
Transverse seating in car 5502

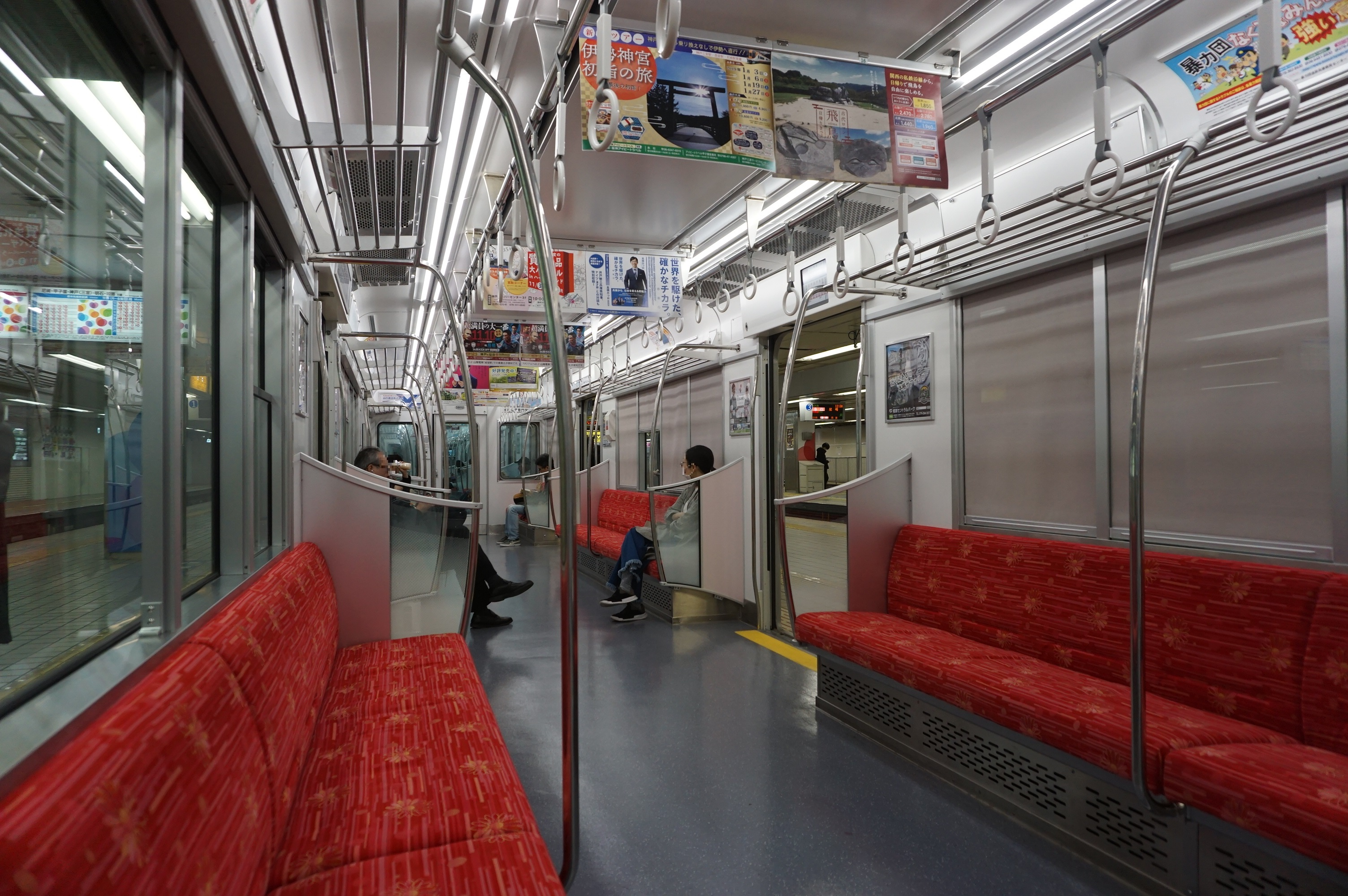
Longitudinal seating in car 5802

== Technical specifications ==
The trains have aluminium alloy bodies, and direct current motors with field-added-excitation control. During refurbishment the controls of car 2 were changed to IGBT/SiC Hybrid module-VFD.

== History ==
The trains entered service in 1986. A total of 60 vehicles were built by Kawasaki Heavy Industries until 1995.

=== Refurbishment ===
Refurbishment began in 2018. Modifications include changes in the exterior design, a modified interior with wheelchair and stoller spaces, and IGBT/SiC Hybrid module-VVVF inverter control in car 2. The number of motored cars was reduced from four to three per six-car set. The first refurbished set entered service on October 30, 2018.

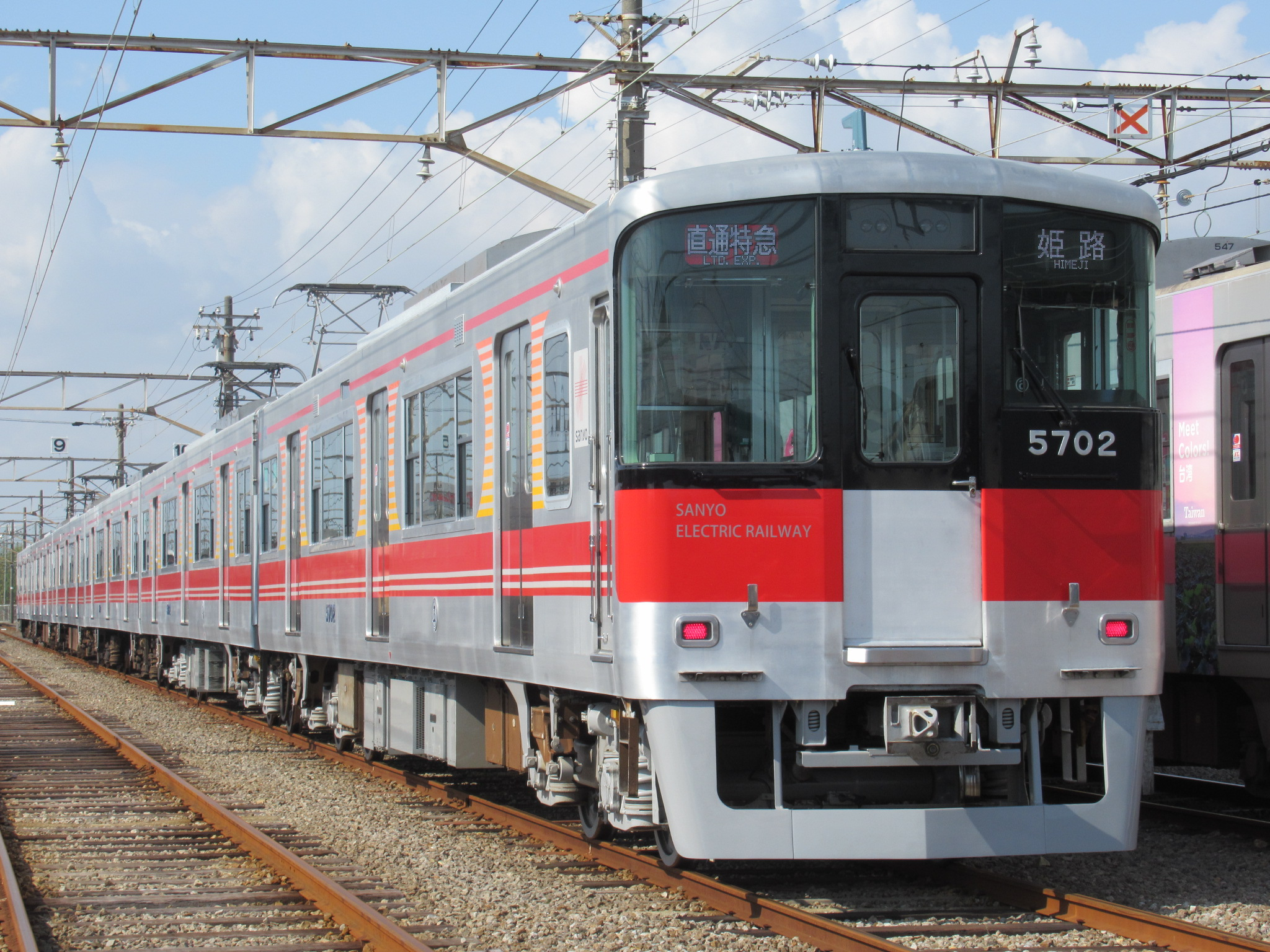
A refurbished 5000 series train

=== Special liveries ===
- Set 5020 entered service in a special wrapping as part of the "Akashi okonattakokyanpēn" (明石行っタコキャンペーン) campaign on March 3, 2009.
- Set 5010 entered service in a special wrapping as part of the "Meet Colors! Taiwan" (Meet Colors！台湾) campaign on June 5, 2017.
- Set 5008 entered service in a "Sanyo train 110th Anniversary" (山陽電車創立110周年記念号)-themed wrapping on July 2, 2017.
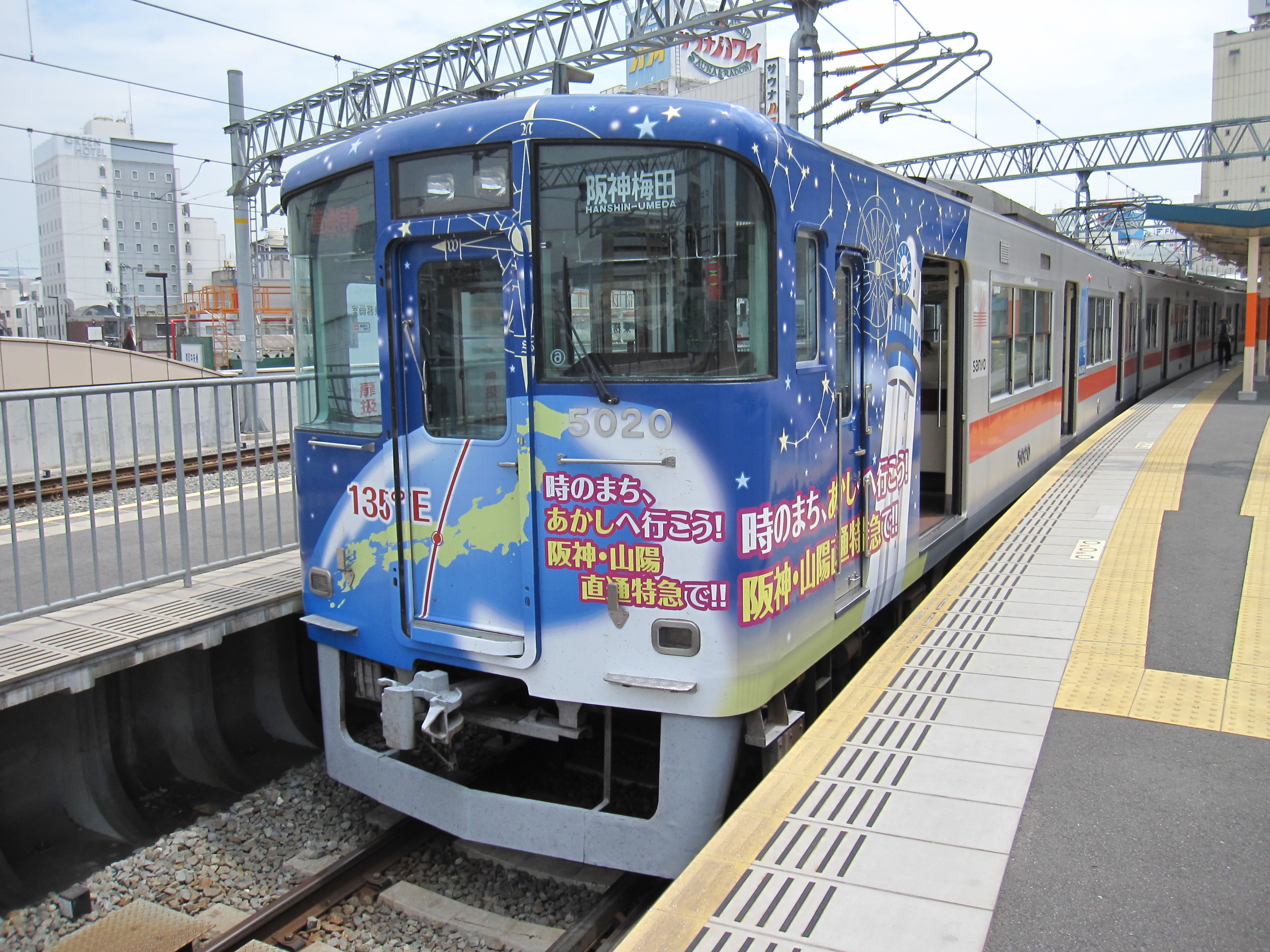
Set 5020 in June 2011

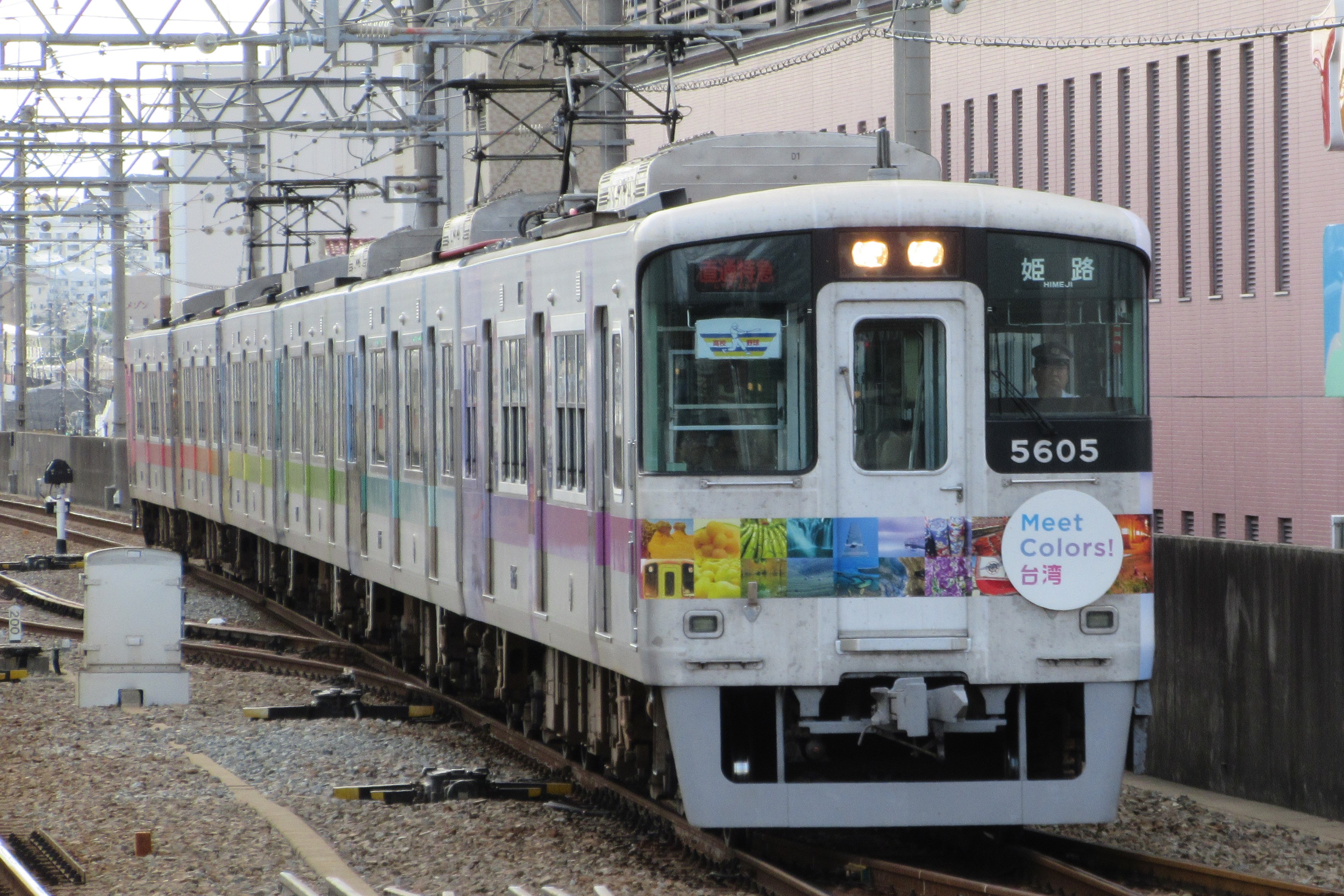
Set 5010 in August 2017

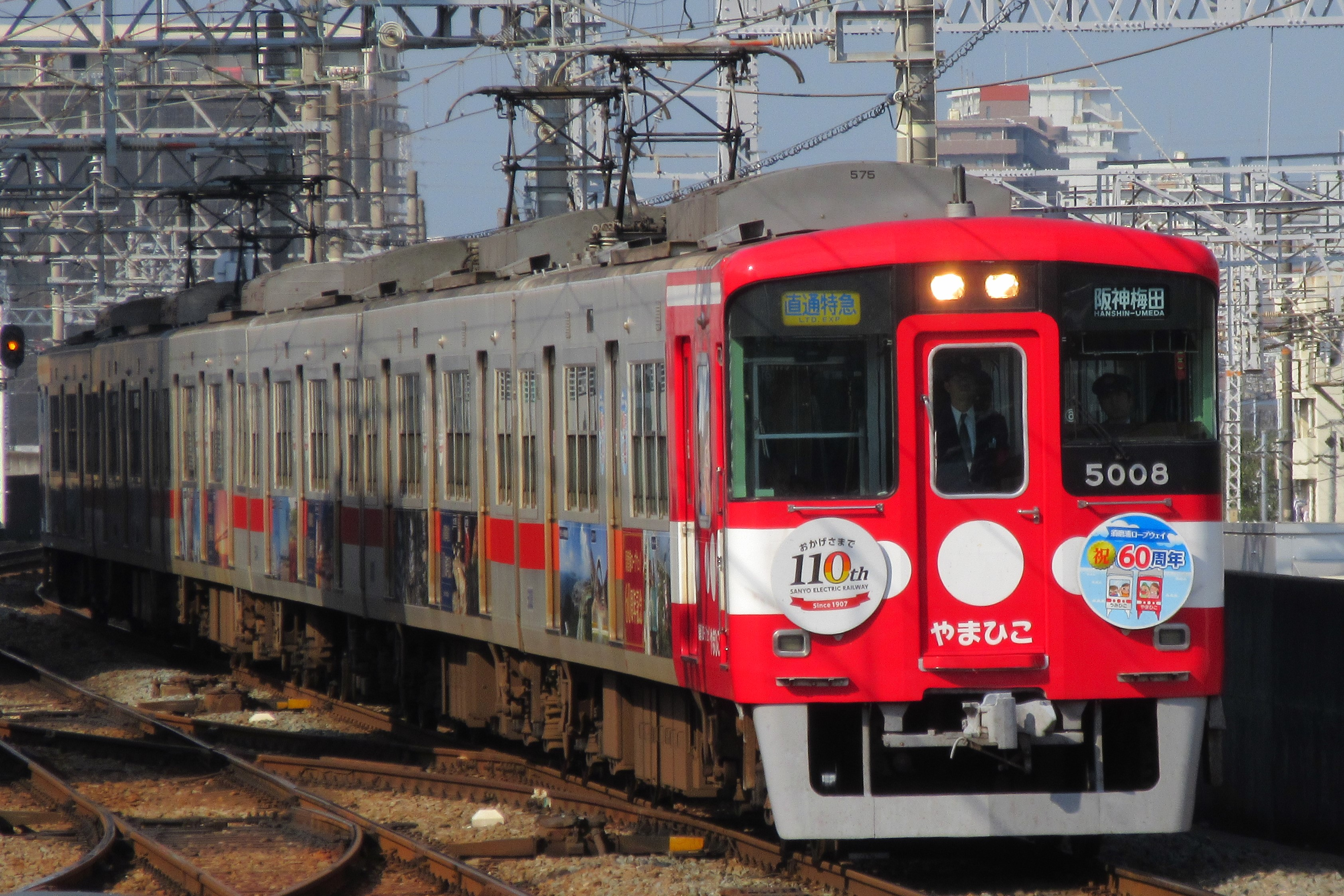
Set 5008 in November 2017
