= 3400 =

3400 may refer to:

== In general ==
- A.D. 3400, a year in the 4th millennium CE
- 3400 BC, a year in the 4th millennium BCE
- 3400, a number in the 3000 (number) range

== Products ==
- IBM 3400 series
- Nord 3400 aircraft
- Meitetsu 3400 series electric multiple unit trains
- NS 3400 steam locomotives
- NS Class 3400 diesel multiple unit trains
- PowerBook 3400c laptop
- Queensland Railways 3400 class electric locomotives

== Other uses ==
- 3400 Aotearoa, an asteroid in the Asteroid Belt, the 3400th asteroid registered
- Hawaii Route 3400, a state highway
- 3400 (District of Librazhd), one of the postal codes in Albania

== See also ==
- A3400 road in the UK
