= Meitetsu 1380 series =

Japanese train type

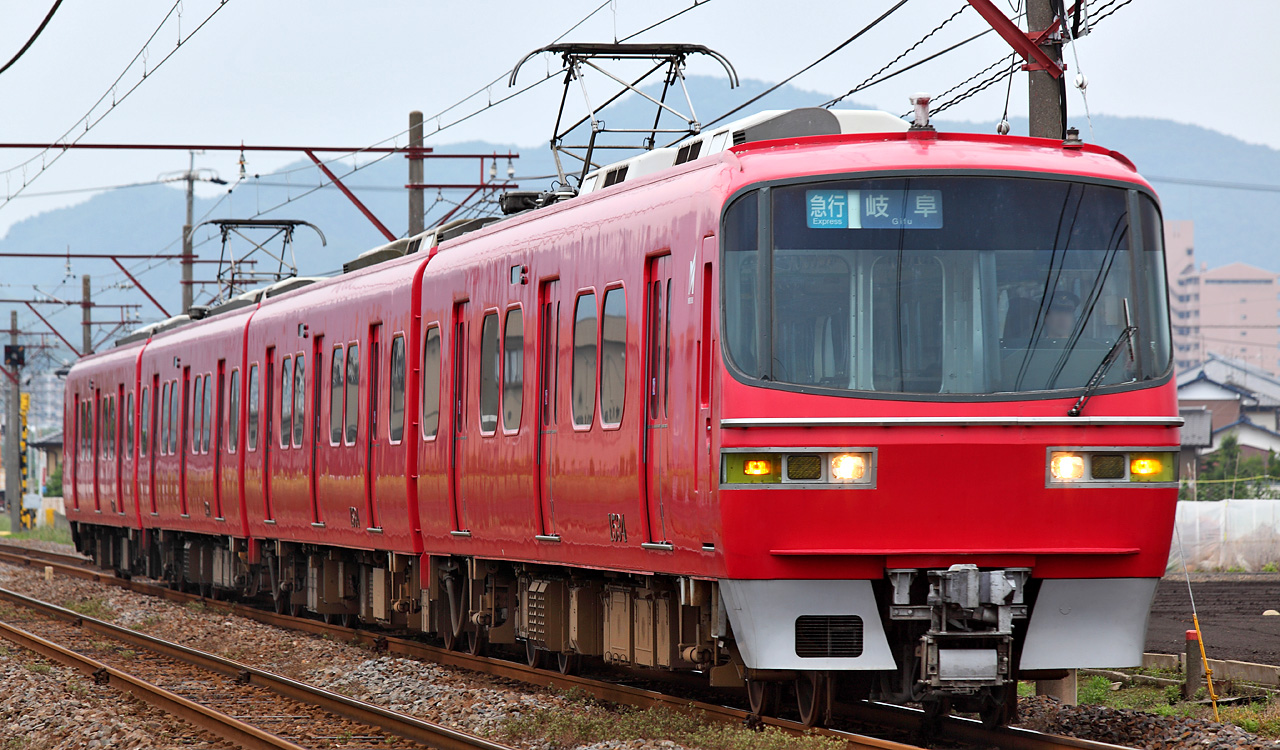
- Set 1384 in June 2009
- In service: 2003 - September 2015
- Manufacturer: Nippon Sharyo (original 1030/1230 series)
- Constructed: 1995 (as 1030/1230 series set 1134)
- Entered service: 2003
- Scrapped: 2015
- Number built: 4 vehicles (1 set)
- Number in service: None
- Number preserved: None
- Number scrapped: 4 vehicles (1 set)
- Formation: 4 cars per set
- Fleet numbers: 1384
- Operator: Meitetsu
- Lines served: Meitetsu Nagoya Main Line, Meitetsu Inuyama Line

Specifications
- Car body construction: Steel
- Doors: 3 pairs per side
- Maximum speed: 120 km/h (75 mph)
- Traction system: GTO field chopper (Toshiba)
- Electric system: 1,500 V DC
- Current collection: Overhead catenary
- Safety system: Meitetsu ATS
- Multiple working: 1800 series
- Track gauge: 1,067 mm (3 ft 6 in)

The Meitetsu 1380 series (名鉄1380系) was an electric multiple unit (EMU) train type operated by the private railway operator Nagoya Railroad (Meitetsu) in Japan from 2003 until September 2015. The unique four-car train was converted from a former 1030/1230 series trainset which sustained accident damage in 2002.

== Formations ==
The single four-car set, numbered 1384, was formed as follows.

Designation	Mc1'	Mc2'	M1	Mc2
Numbering	1384	1334	1584	1534

- The M2' and Mc2 cars each had one lozenge-type pantograph.

== Interior ==
Passenger accommodation consisted of a mixture of transverse seating with flip-over seat backs and some longitudinal seating.

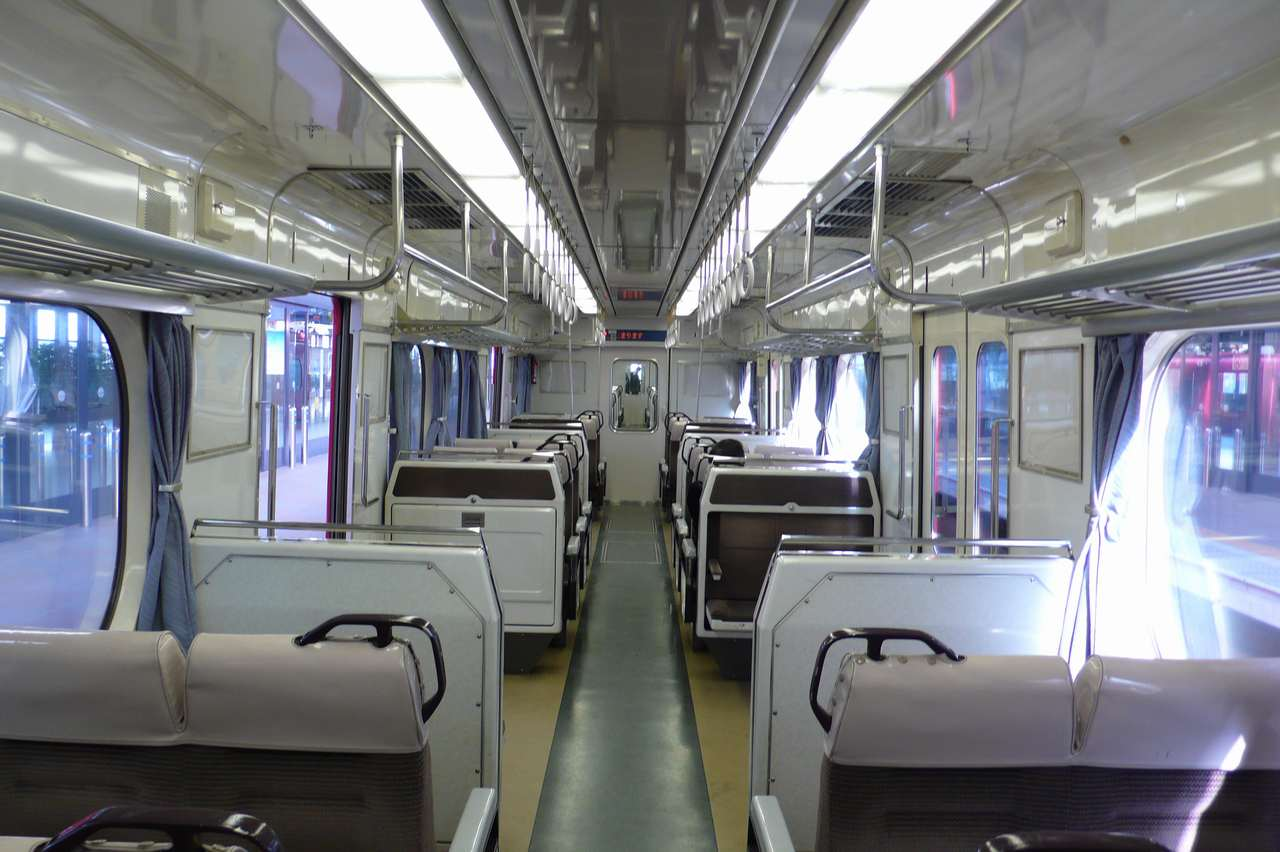
An interior view in December 2008

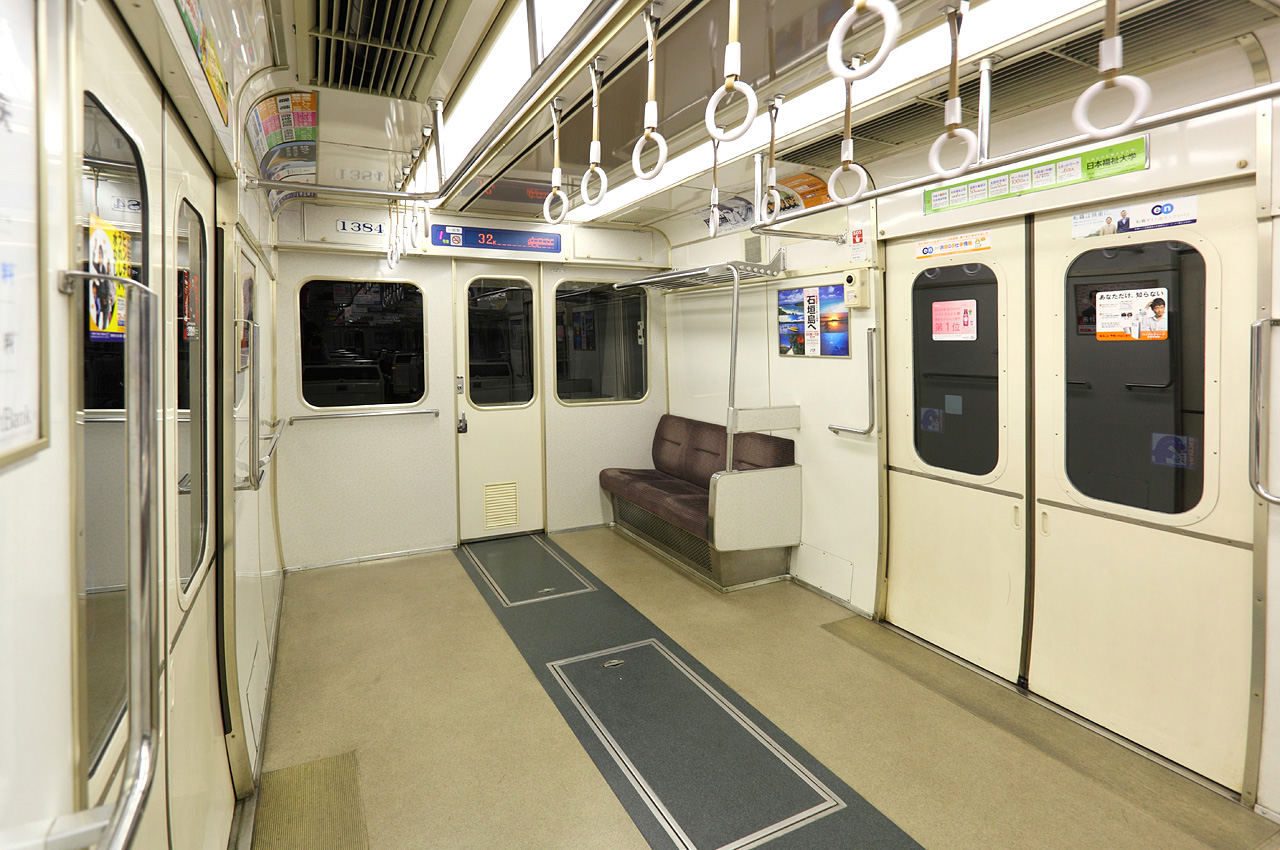
The interior of end car 1384

== History ==
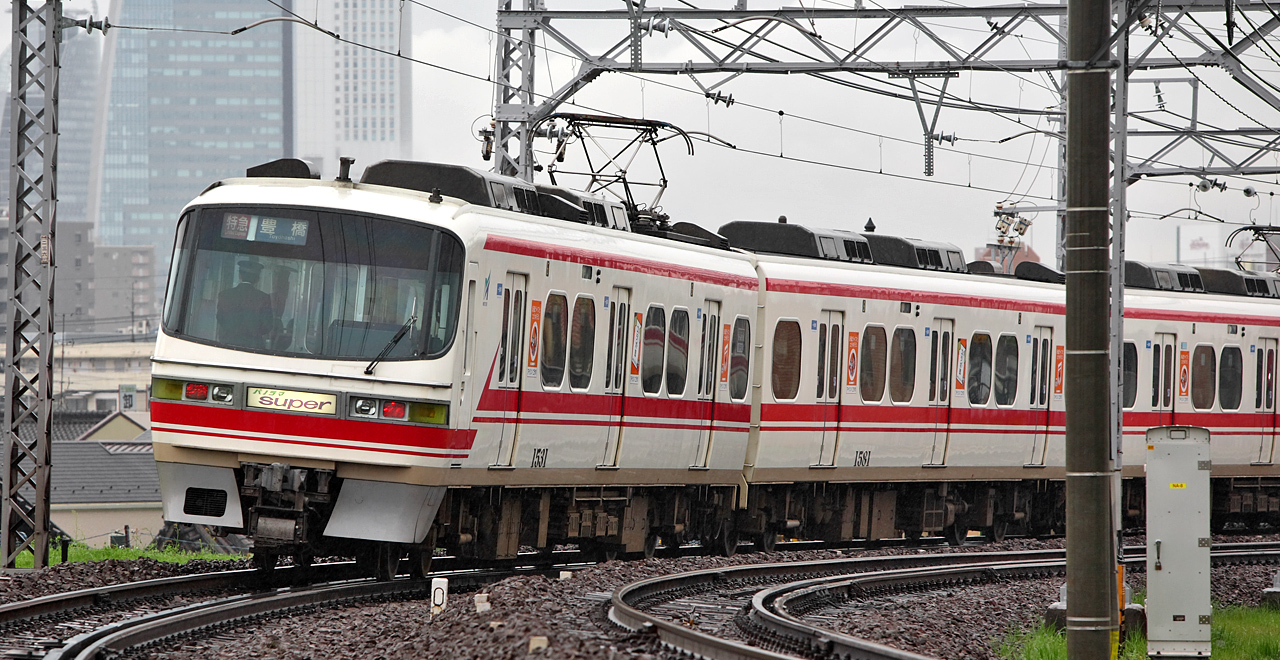
A 1030/1230 series train (set 1131) in April 2008

The 1380 set was introduced in 2003, reformed from former 1030/1230 series six-car set 1134, which sustained damage to the limited express (1030 series) cars in a level crossing accident in 2002. The limited express cars were scrapped, and a new cab was added to the former intermediate car 1384, creating a new four-car set for use on commuter services. The train was also repainted from the original red and white limited express livery into the standard Meitetsu commuter train livery of all-over red.

Set 1384 made its last run on 2 September 2015, before being taken out of service.
