= Meitetsu 1800 series =

Japanese electric multiple unit train type

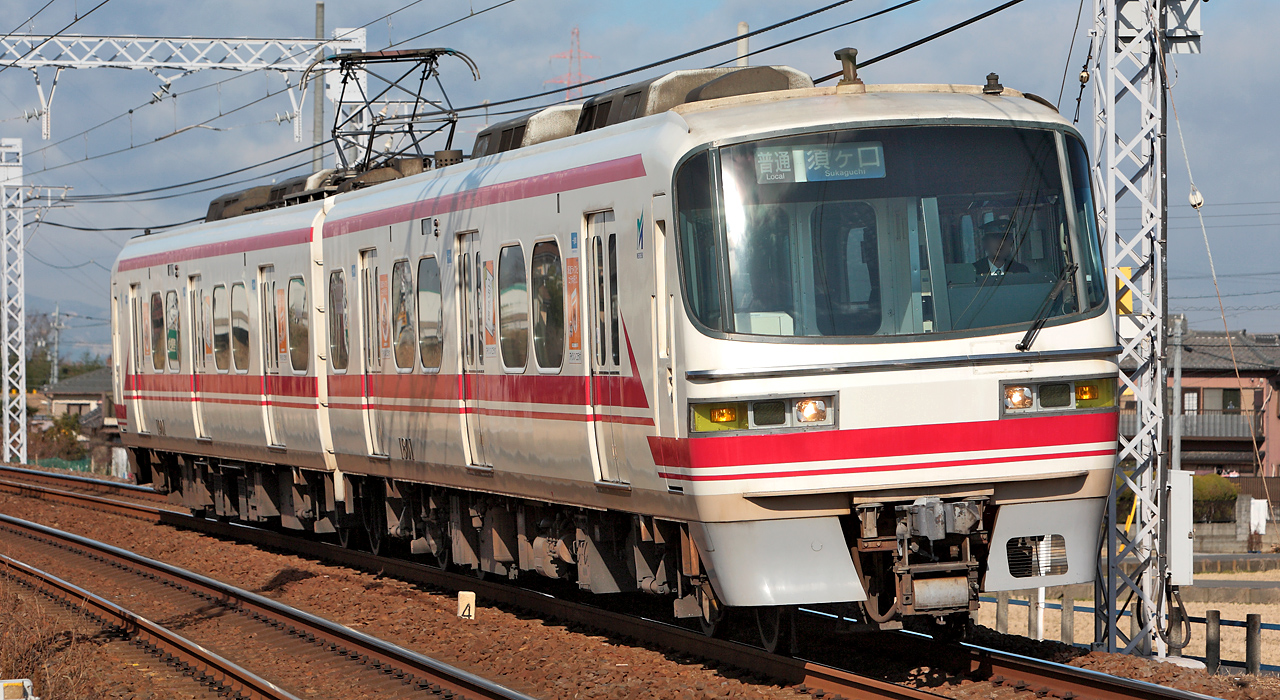
- Set 1801 in December 2008
- Family name: Panorama Super
- Entered service: 1991
- Refurbished: 2017-
- Number built: 24 vehicles (12 sets)
- Number in service: 18 vehicles (9 sets)
- Number preserved: 2 vehicles (1 set)
- Formation: 2 cars per set
- Fleet numbers: 1801-1809, 1851-1853
- Operator: Meitetsu

Specifications
- Car body construction: Steel
- Maximum speed: 120 km/h (75 mph)
- Traction system: Chopper Control
- Acceleration: 2.2 km/(h⋅s) (1.4 mph/s)
- Electric system: 1,500 V DC
- Current collection: Overhead catenary
- Track gauge: 1,067 mm (3 ft 6 in)

The Meitetsu 1800 series (名鉄1800系) is an electric multiple unit (EMU) type operated by the private railway operator Nagoya Railroad (Meitetsu) in Japan since 1991.

== Variants ==
The type consists of nine two-car 1800 series sets introduced in 1991, and three two-car 1850 series sets introduced in 1992, built using the underframes and electrical equipment from withdrawn 7500 series "Panorama Car" EMUs.

== Operations ==
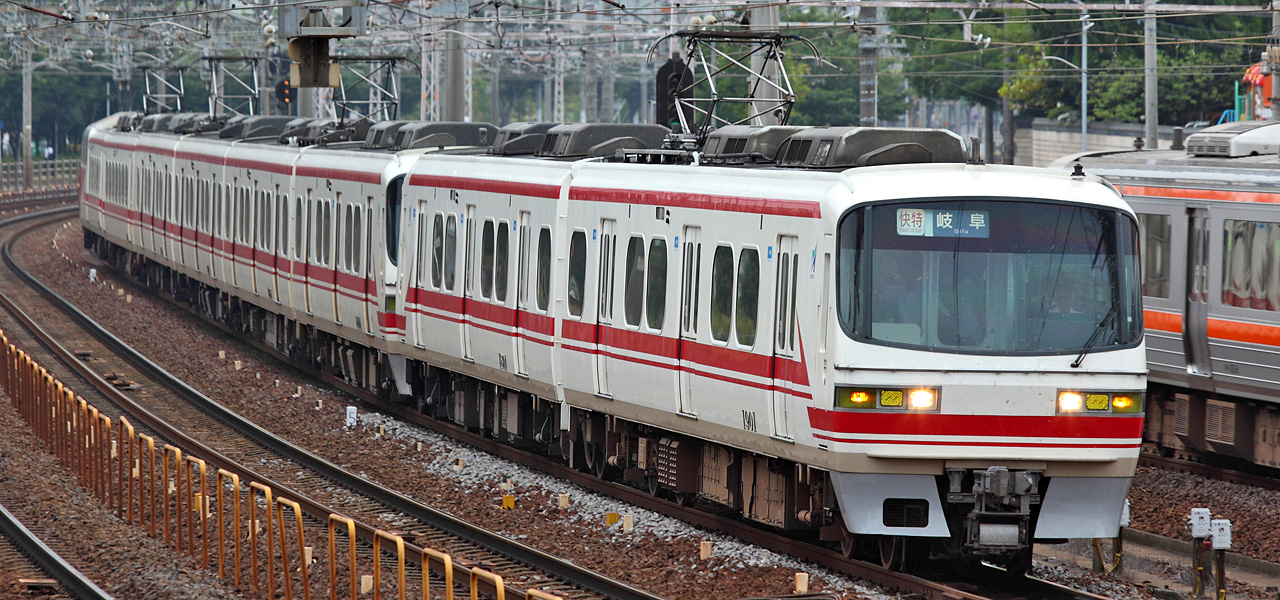
Set 1801 with a 6-car 1000/1200 series set in September 2009

The 1800 series was introduced in 1991 as two-car commuter-style sets to be coupled to six-car 1000/1200 series sets on limited express services during the busy peak hours. Sets are also used on their own or in pairs on other services.

== Formations ==
As of 1 April 2016, the fleet consists of nine two-car 1800 series sets (1801 to 1809) and two two-car 1850 series sets (1851 to 1852), formed as follows.

=== 1800 series ===
Designation	Tc1	Mc
Numbering	180x	190x

The Mc cars have one lozenge-type pantograph.

=== 1850 series ===
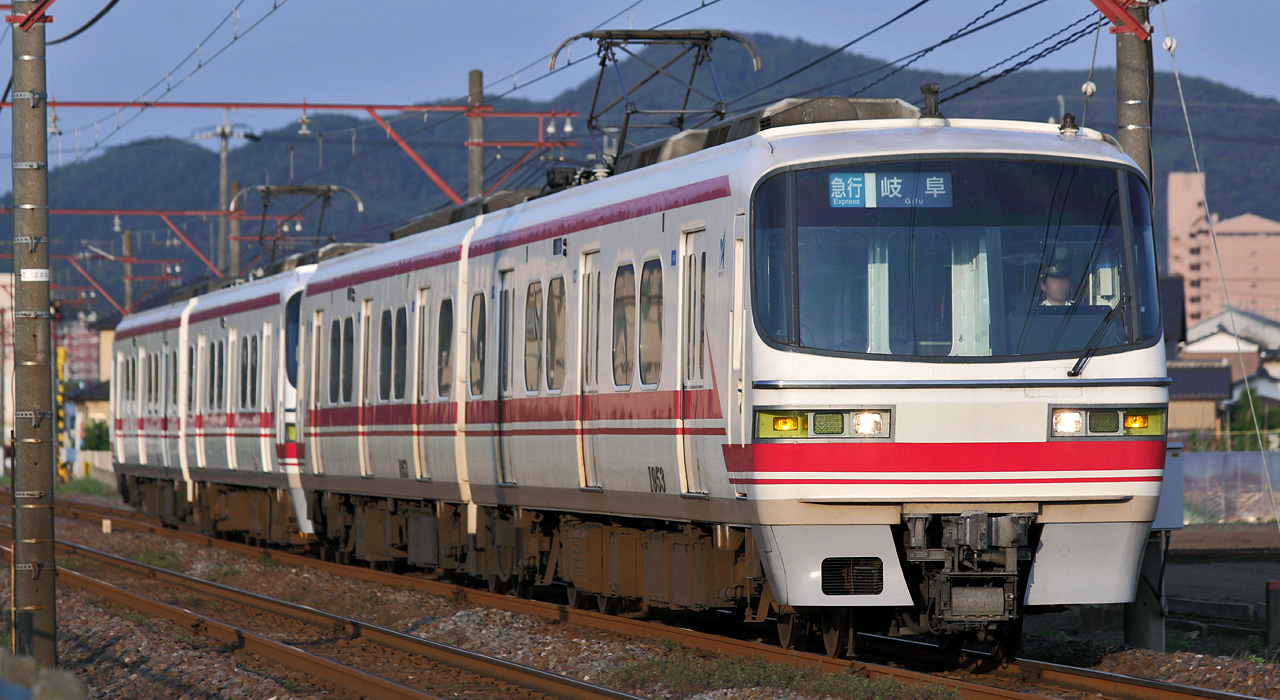
1850 series set 1853 with an 1800 series set in June 2009

Designation	Mc1	Mc2
Numbering	185x	195x

The Mc2 cars have one lozenge-type pantograph.

== Interior ==
The 1800 and 1850 series cars have transverse seating with flip-over seat backs to face the direction of travel.

== History ==
The 1800 series trains were first introduced in 1991, to augment the 1000/1200 series trainsets. In 1992, three more two-car sets were built, reusing the underframes and electrical equipment from withdrawn 7500 series "Panorama Car" EMU cars.

=== Refurbishment ===
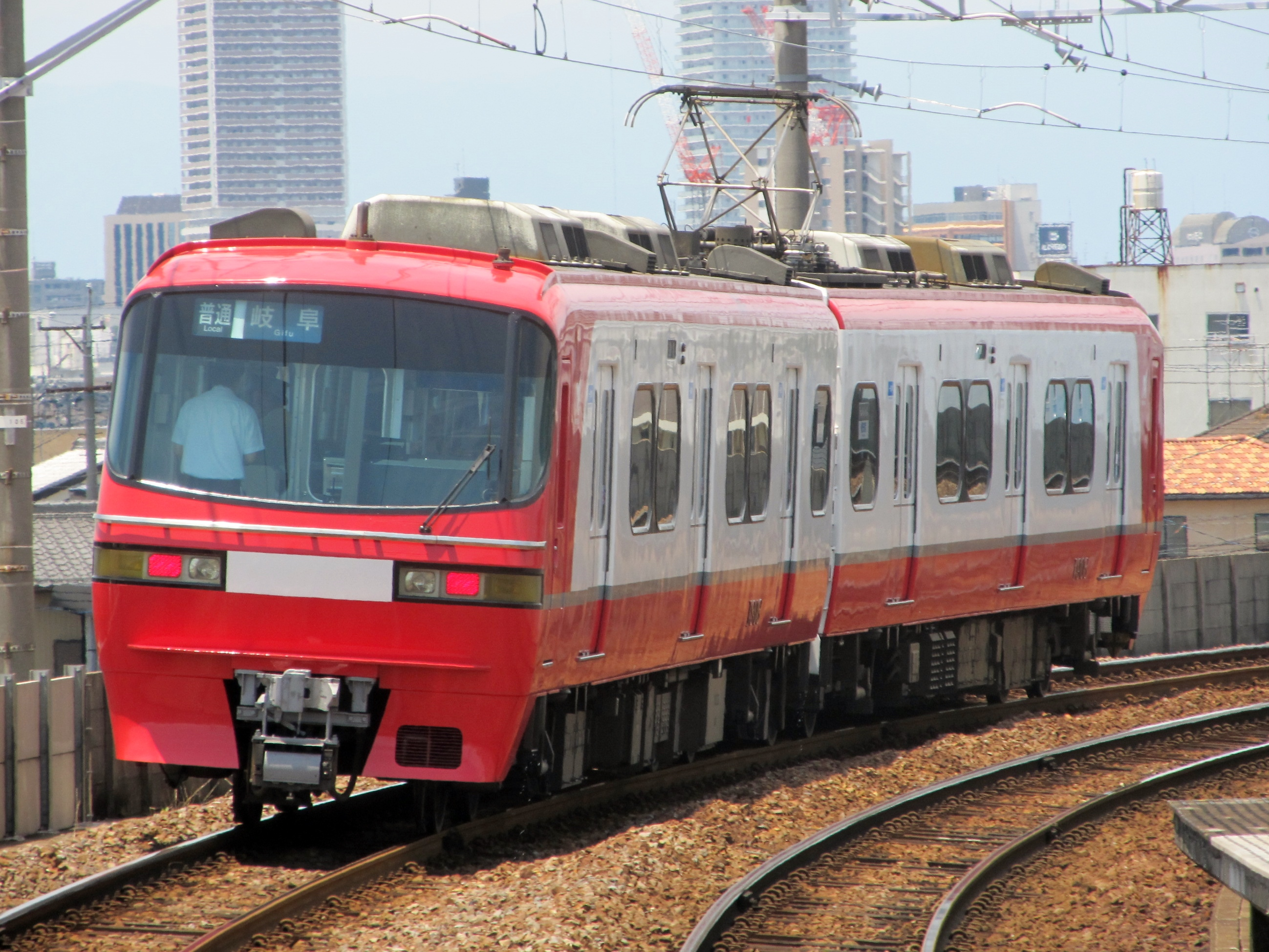
Set 1808 in July 2017

From 2017, the fleet underwent a programme of refurbishment. The first 1800 series set to be refurbished and reliveried was 1808 in May 2017.
