= 1800 series =

1800 series may refer to the following:

- Keihan 1800 series electric multiple unit train type operated by Keihan Electric Railway
- Keio 1800 series electric multiple unit train type operated by Keio Corporation
- Meitetsu 1800 series electric multiple unit train type
- Tobu 1800 series electric multiple unit train type
- Toyohashi 1800 series electric multiple unit train type operated by Toyohashi Railroad
