= Meitetsu 1200 series =

Japanese train type

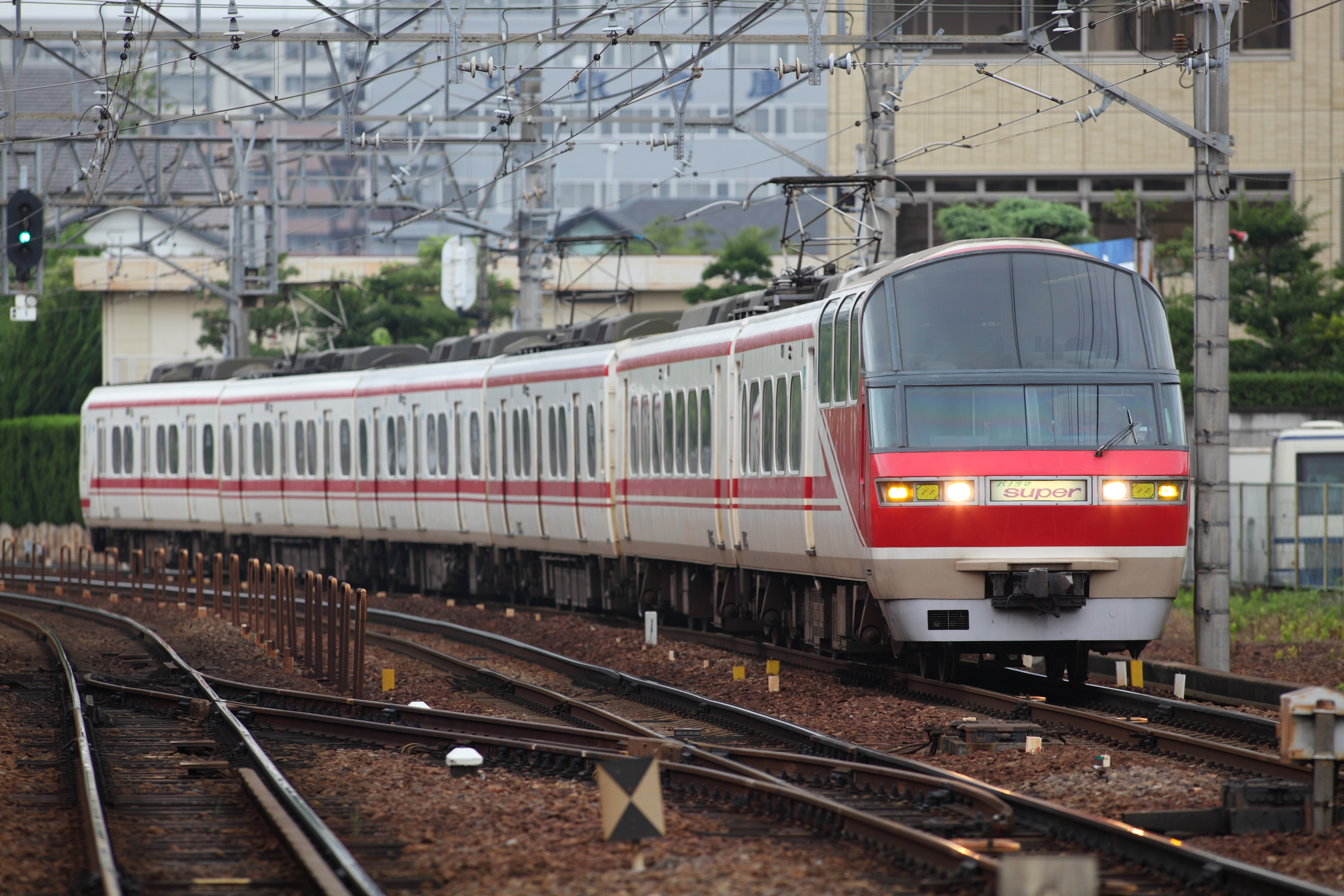
- 6-car 1200 series set 1115 in July 2009
- In service: 1988–Present
- Manufacturer: Nippon Sharyo
- Family name: Panorama Super
- Replaced: Meitetsu 7000 series
- Constructed: 1988–1997
- Refurbished: 2015–2019
- Scrapped: 2007–
- Number in service: 90 vehicles (15 sets) (as of 1 April 2015)
- Number scrapped: 60 vehicles (15 sets)
- Formation: 6 cars per set (originally 4 cars)
- Fleet numbers: 1011–1016, 1111–1116, 1131–1133
- Operators: Meitetsu

Specifications
- Maximum speed: 120 km/h (75 mph)
- Traction system: Field chopper control
- Electric system(s): 1,500 V DC
- Current collector(s): Overhead catenary
- Safety system(s): Meitetsu ATS, dead man's switch
- Track gauge: 1,067 mm (3 ft 6 in)

The Meitetsu 1200 series (名鉄1200系) is an electric multiple unit (EMU) type operated by the private railway operator Nagoya Railroad (Meitetsu) in Japan since 1988. The trains consist of two limited express style 1000 series (or 1030 series) cars and four commuter style 1200 series (or 1230 series) cars.

== Formations ==
As of 1 April 2015, the fleet consists of 12 six-car 1000/1200 series sets and three six-car 1030/1230 series sets, formed as follows. Four-car 1000 series sets formed of only limited express style cars also previously operated.

=== 1000/1200 series sets 1011-1016 ===
Car No.	1	2	3	4	5	6
Designation	Tc1	M2	M1'	T	M2'	Mc1
Numbering	101x	106x	126x	121x	146x	141x

- Cars 2, 3, and 5 each have one lozenge-type pantograph.
- Car 3 has a toilet.
- Car 4 is designated as a mildly air-conditioned car.

=== 1000/1200 series sets 1111-1116 ===
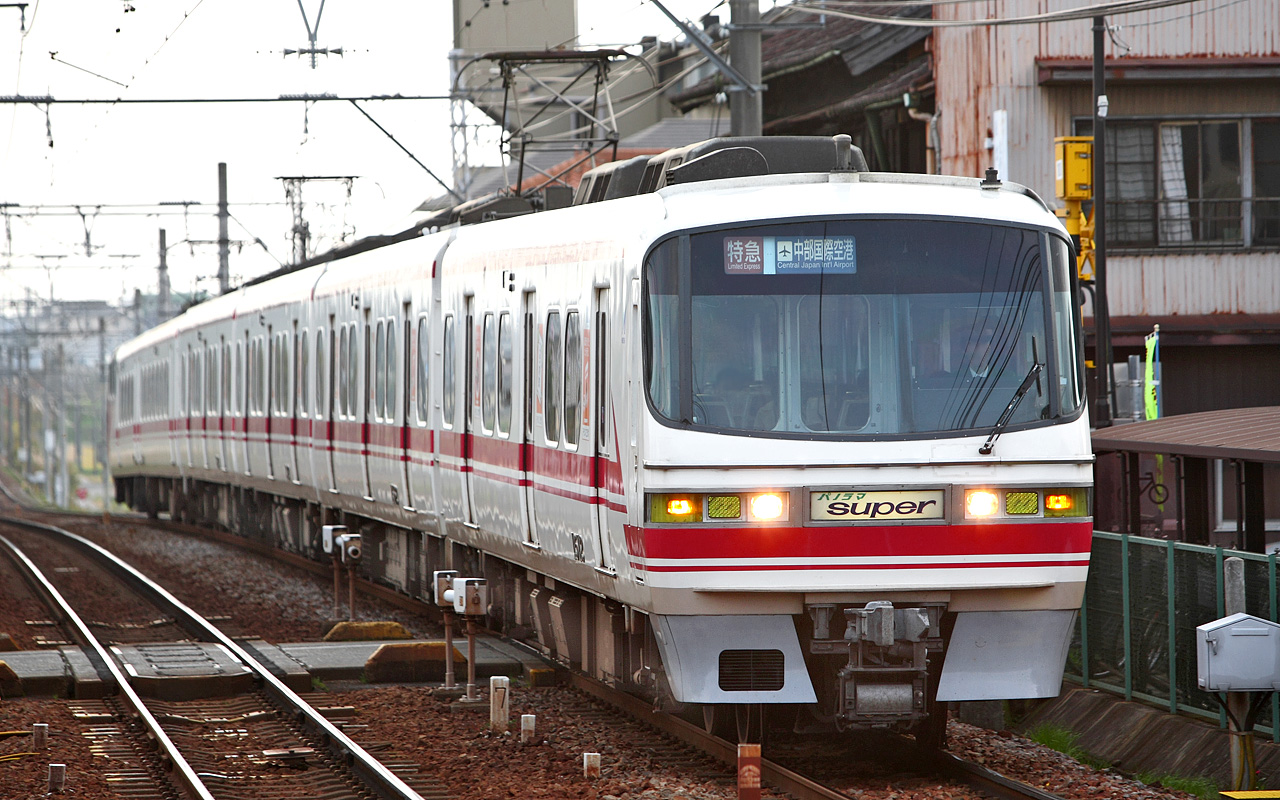
The 1200 series end of set 1112 in November 2008

Car No.	1	2	3	4	5	6
Designation	Tc2	M1	M2	T	M2'	Mc1
Numbering	111x	116x	136x	131x	156x	151x

- Cars 2, 3, and 5 each have one lozenge-type pantograph.
- Car 2 has a toilet.
- Car 4 is designated as a mildly air-conditioned car.

=== 1030/1230 series sets 1131-1133 ===
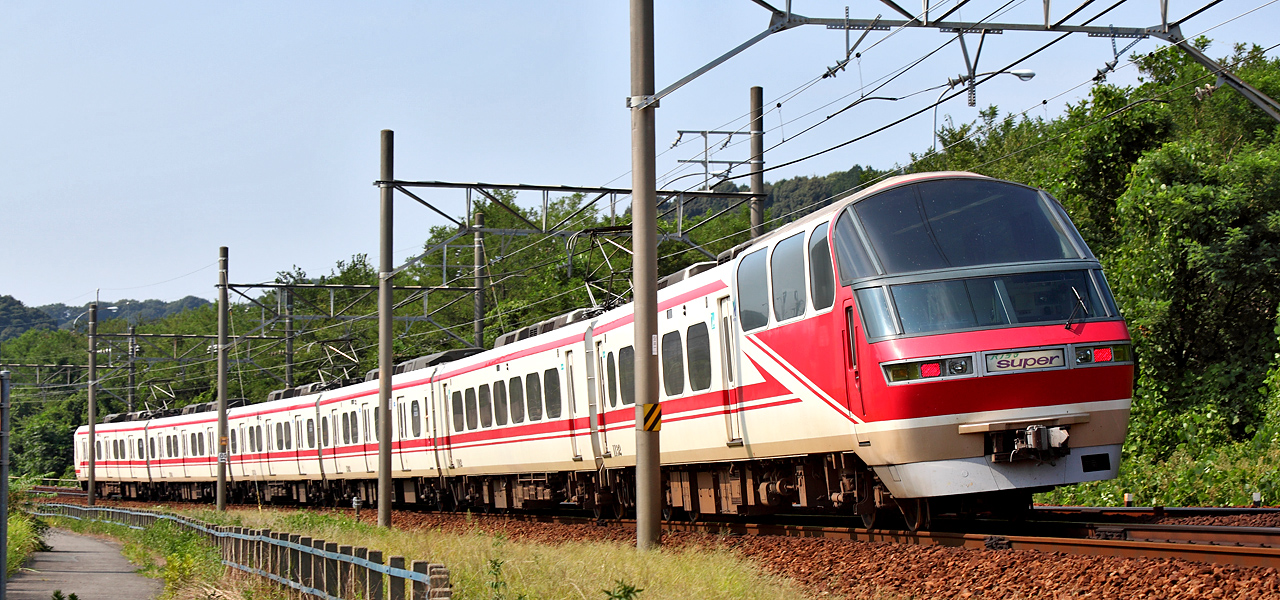
1030/1230 series set 1132 in August 2009

Car No.	1	2	3	4	5	6
Designation	Mc1	M2	M1'	M2'	M1	Mc2
Numbering	113x	118x	138x	133x	158x	153x

- Cars 2, 4, and 6 each had one lozenge-type pantograph.
- Car 2 had a toilet.
- Car 4 was designated as a mildly air-conditioned car.

=== Original 1000 series 4-car sets ===
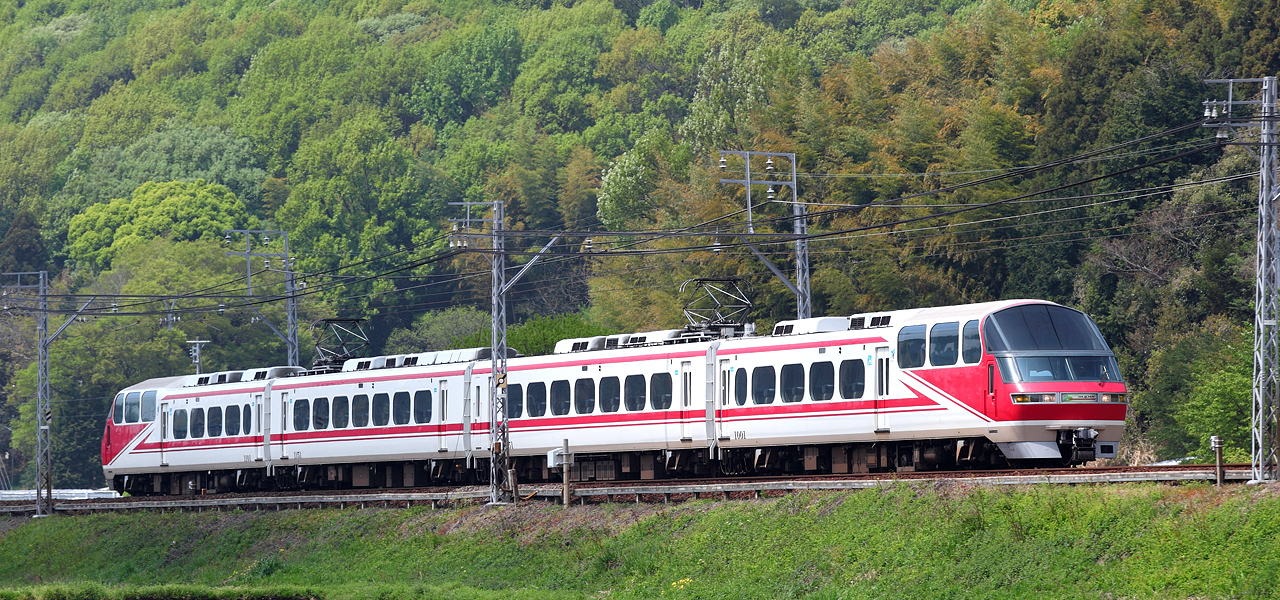
Four-car set 1001 in April 2009

The original four-car 1000 series sets were formed as follows. These were removed from regular service in December 2008, and all withdrawn by April 2009.

Car No.	1	2	3	4
Designation	Tc1	M2	M1	Tc2
Numbering	10xx		11xx	

- Cars 2 and 3 each had one lozenge-type pantograph.

== Interior ==
The 1000 and 1030 series cars have unidirectional reclining seating with a seat pitch of 1,000 mm (39 in), while the 1200 and 1230 series cars have flip-over transverse seating.

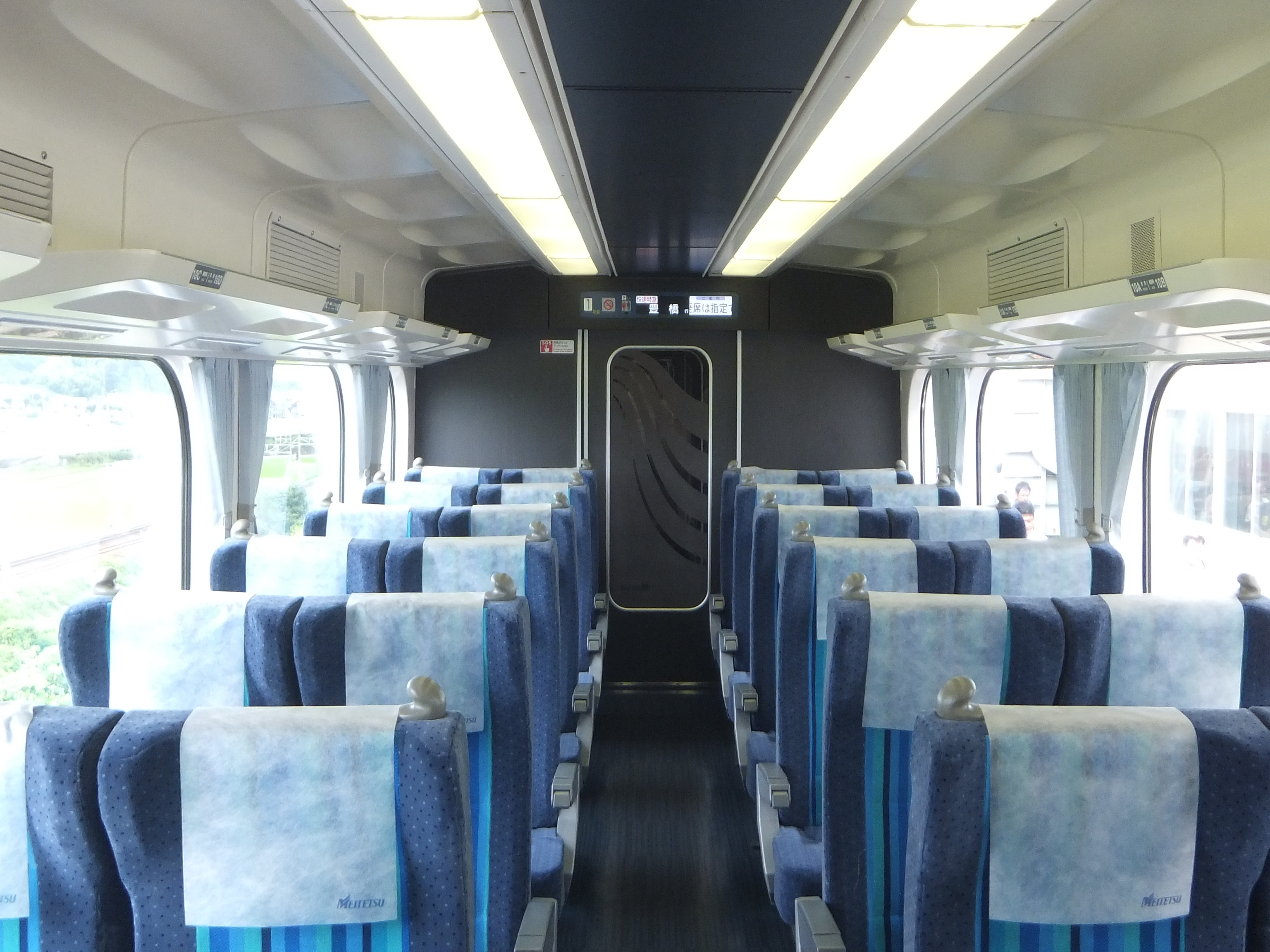
The reserved-seating car of refurbished set 1112 in August 2015

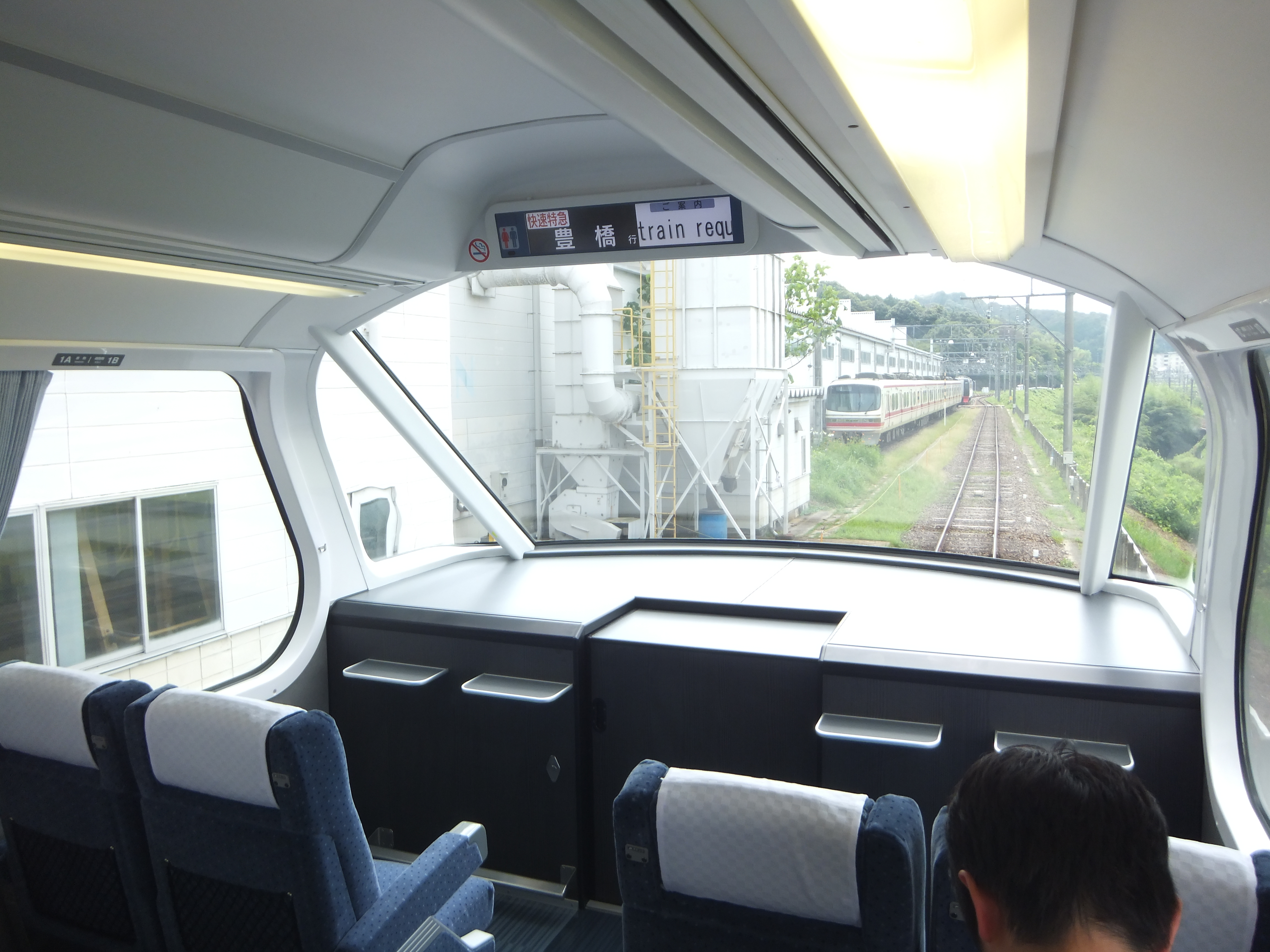
The forward view from the reserved-seating car of refurbished set 1112 in August 2015

== History ==
The 1000 series trains were first introduced in 1988, as four-car sets formed entirely of limited express style cars. Between 1991 and 1992, six of the four-car sets (1011 to 1016) were split up and combined with four 1200 series commuter style cars to create new six-car 1000/1200 series mixed sets.

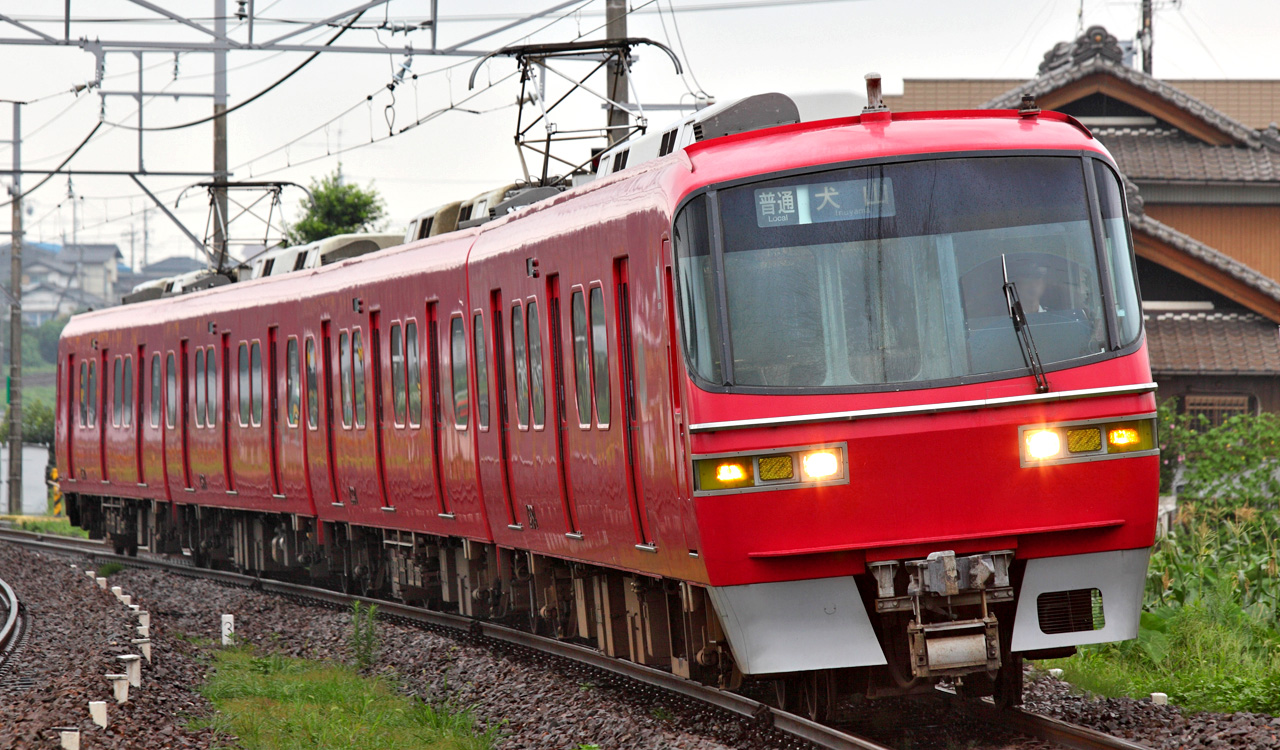
The sole 1380 series set, 1384, in July 2009

In 1992, four more six-car sets were built, reusing electrical equipment from withdrawn 7500 series "Panorama Car" EMU cars, and classified 1030/1230 series. These sets differed from the earlier 1000/1200 series trainsets in having all cars motored. Set 1134 was converted to become a four-car 1380 series commuter set in 2002 after the limited express (1030 series) cars sustained collision damage and had to be scrapped.

From 2015, the designation for the trains was standardized to simply "1200 series".

=== Withdrawal ===
The remaining four-car sets were removed from regular service from the start of the timetable revision on 27 December 2008. Set 1001 was used on a special farewell run on 18 April 2009. Some of the electrical equipment from these sets being reused in 5000 series commuter EMUs.

The 1030 series was also discontinued when the last functioning 1030 series set (1131) was removed from service on 18 March 2019 after the refurbishment of all other 1200 series sets was finished that same year.

=== Refurbishment ===
From fiscal 2015, three 6-car 1200 series sets (18 vehicles) are scheduled to be refurbished with new interiors and exterior livery. The first set treated, 1112, was unveiled in August 2015. Refurbishment work includes replacing the original "Panorama Super" headboard panel with a colour LED destination indicator, and a new livery similar to that carried by the 2200 series trains.

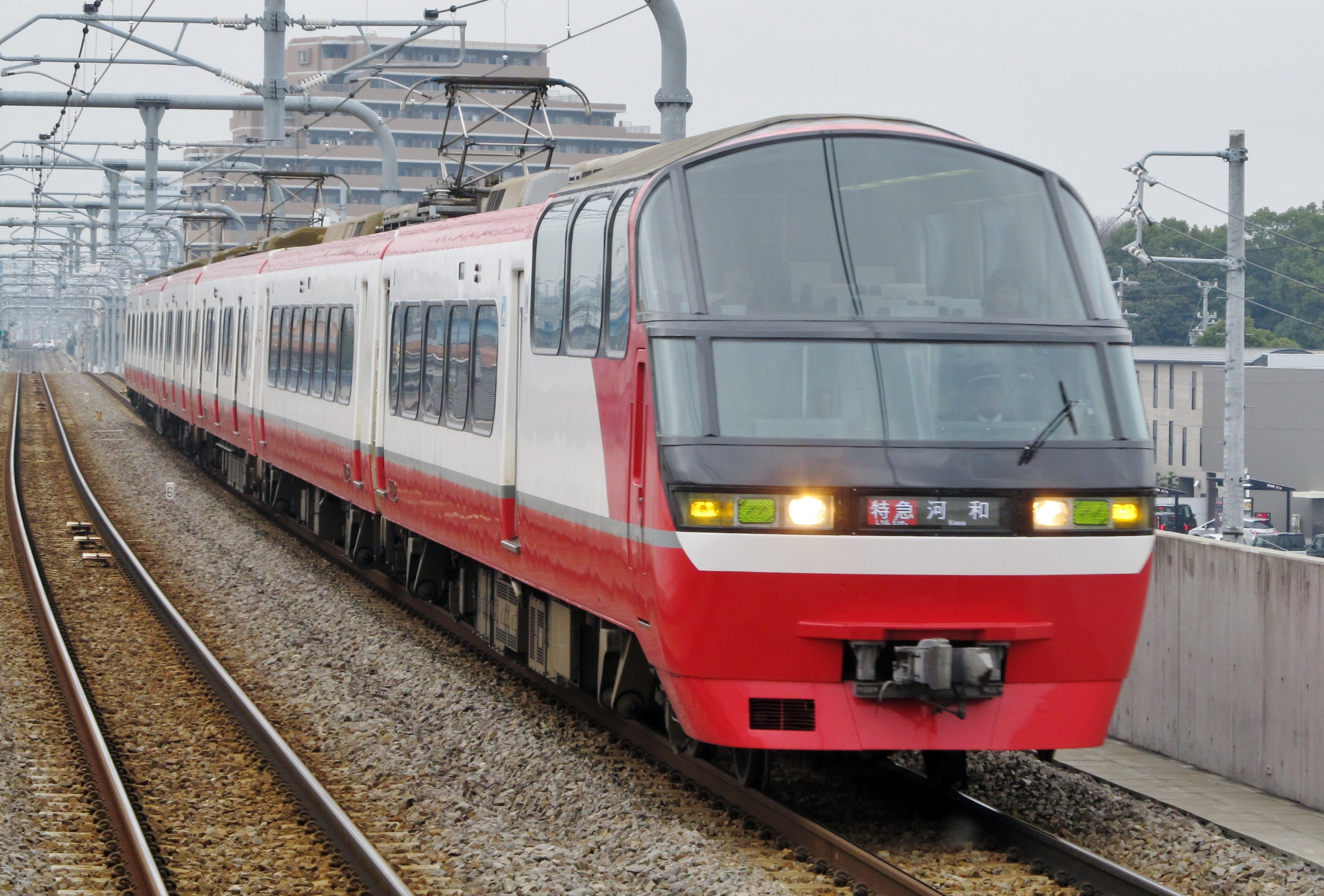
Refurbished set 1112 in December 2015

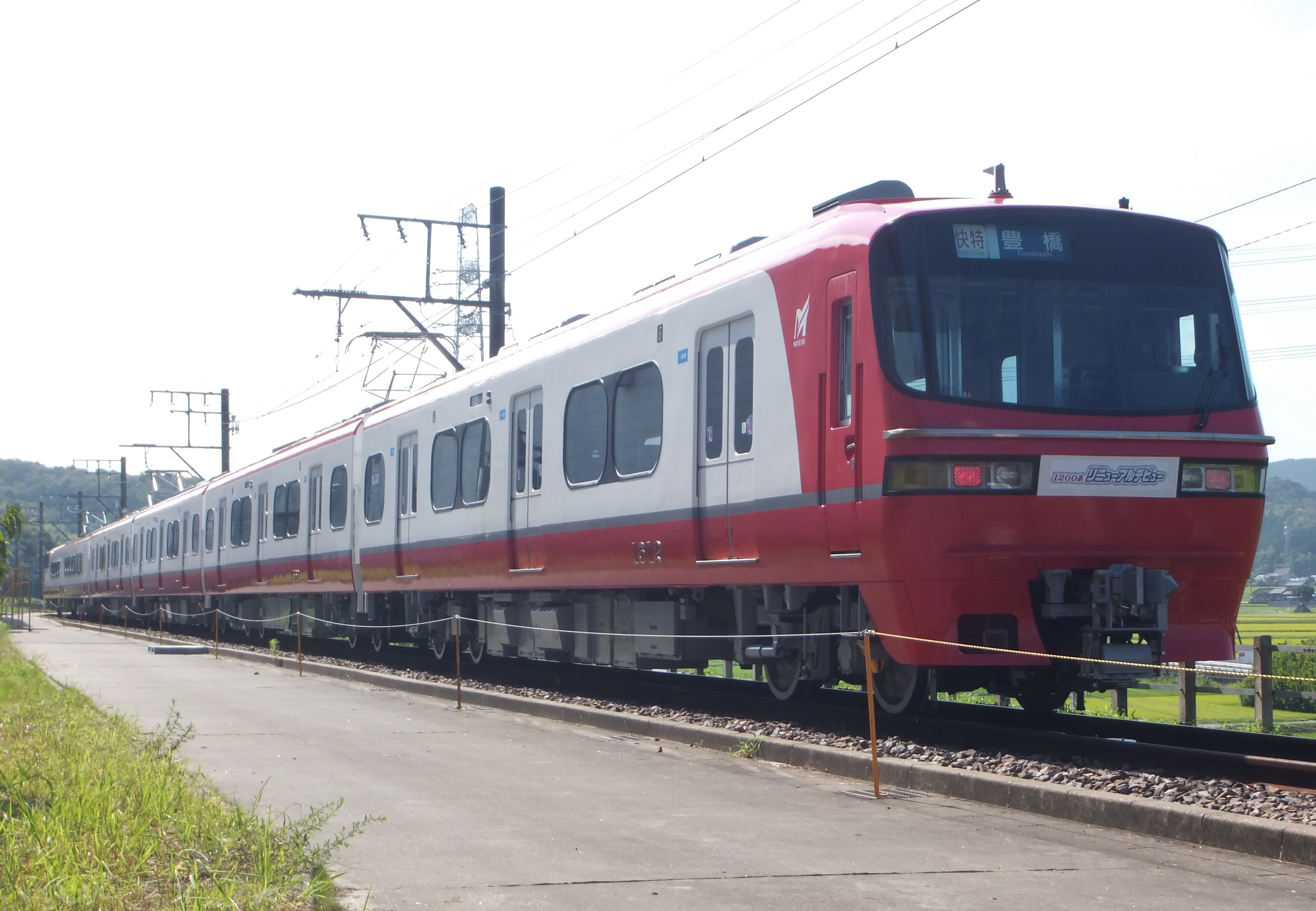
Refurbished set 1112 in August 2015
