= Meitetsu 3400 series =

Japanese rolling stock used by Meitetsu

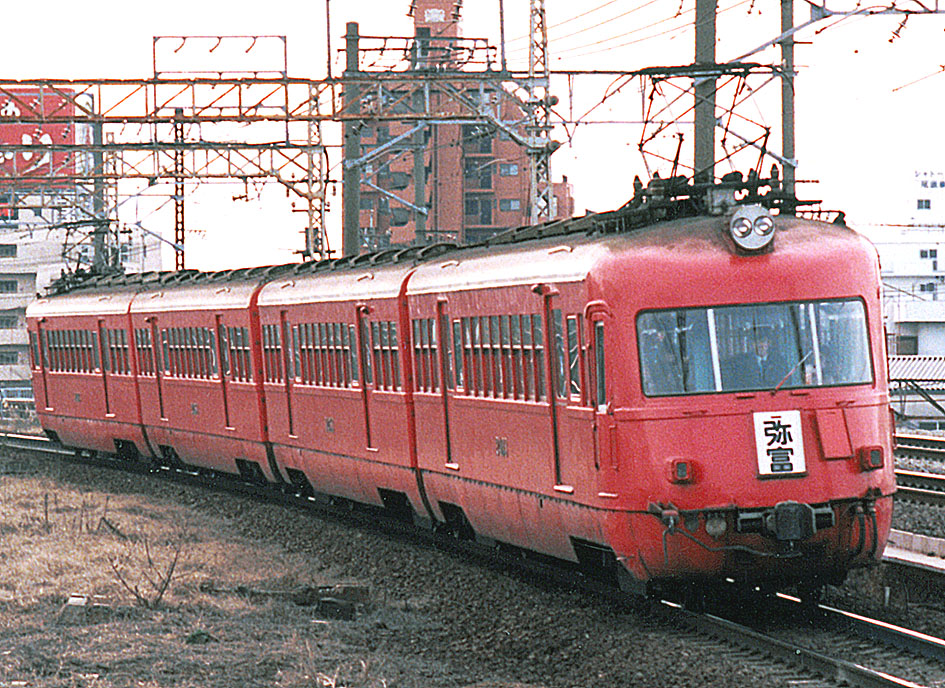
- 3400 series set 3403 in 1988
- In service: 1937–2002
- Manufacturer: Nippon Sharyo
- Built at: Toyokawa, Aichi
- Constructed: 1937, 1950, 1953
- Entered service: March 1937
- Refurbished: 1967-1968
- Scrapped: 1988, 2006
- Number built: 12 vehicles (three sets)
- Number in service: 0
- Number preserved: One
- Number scrapped: 11
- Formation: 2 cars per set (1937-1950, 1988-2002); 3 cars per set (1950-1953); 4 cars per set (1953-1988)
- Fleet numbers: 3401–3403
- Capacity: 92 (56 seats)
- Operators: Meitetsu

Specifications
- Car body construction: Semi-steel
- Car length: 19 m (62 ft 4 in)
- Doors: Two pairs per side
- Maximum speed: 120 km/h (75 mph)
- Electric system(s): 1,500 V DC overhead catenary
- Current collection: pantograph
- Track gauge: 1,067 mm (3 ft 6 in)

The Meitetsu 3400 series (名鉄3400系) was a commuter electric multiple unit (EMU) train type operated by the private railway operator Meitetsu in Japan from 1937 to 2002.

The train was designed as the first new train by Meitetsu, which was formed from merger between Aichi Electric Railways and Meiki Railways in 1935. New cars were commissioned in 1950 and 1953 to augment the fleet to four cars per trainset.

== Background ==
When the Meitetsu was formed in 1935 by the merger of the Aichi Electric Railways and Meiki Railways, the railway electrification of the lines were different, with lines inherited from Aichi Electric Railways electrified at 1,500 V and lines inherited from Meiki Railways electrified at 600 V. The two networks, based on Jingū-mae and Oshikirichō were not connected to each other as well, forcing the operation and management of trains to be separated.

The Nagoya Pan-Pacific Peace Exposition was planned to be held in 1937 at the time with a large increase in passengers expected, and Meitetsu planned new rolling stocks to be in service by February 1937 in 1936 to compete with the Ministry of Railways. Two designer teams from the former Aichi Electric Railways and Meiki Railways designed the new rolling stocks. While the 850 series designed by former Meiki Railways team was based on Debo 800 series, the last rolling stock designed by Meiki Railways, the Meitetsu 3400 series by the former Aichi Electric Railways team was not based on previous rolling stocks. This difference in design is thought to be caused by the fact that Meiki Railways was based on and funded by conservatives in Nagoya, while the Aichi Electric Railways was based on an electric company and was very ambitious to incorporate new technologies.

== History ==
The sets 3401 and 3402 entered operation on March 20, 1937, 5 days after the Nagoya Pan-Pacific Peace Exposition began. The set 3403 entered operation on April 15 in the same year. The official test run of the set 3401 was done three days before it entered operation, which ran faster than 100 km/h (62 mph). Nagoya Shinbun (currently Chunichi Shimbun) reported the test run with the heading "One Hundred kilometers per hour, faster than the Tsubame". The sets were used for limited express and rapid services in the eastern rail network formerly owned by Aichi Electric Railways.

During the Pacific War, the types of seats were changed to increase capacity, and broken windows were separated when it was repaired. Although the fleet was not damaged from the war, set 3403 caught fire from a short circuit and took over a year to be repaired due to lack of resources.

The train was initially commissioned in a two-car formation, but in 1948, after the end of the Pacific War, the unification of overhead voltages on the eastern and western lines was completed, and direct east-west operation began. Along with this event, the operation of premium trains in the Nagoya Main line was changed to use a four-car formation. In response to the change to the form, three intermediate electric vehicles were constructed and incorporated into the formation in 1950 and 1953. Limited express services using the sets on the main lines were abolished and replaced by Meitetsu 7000 series, branded Panorama Cars, in 1961.

=== Post-refurbishment and retirement ===
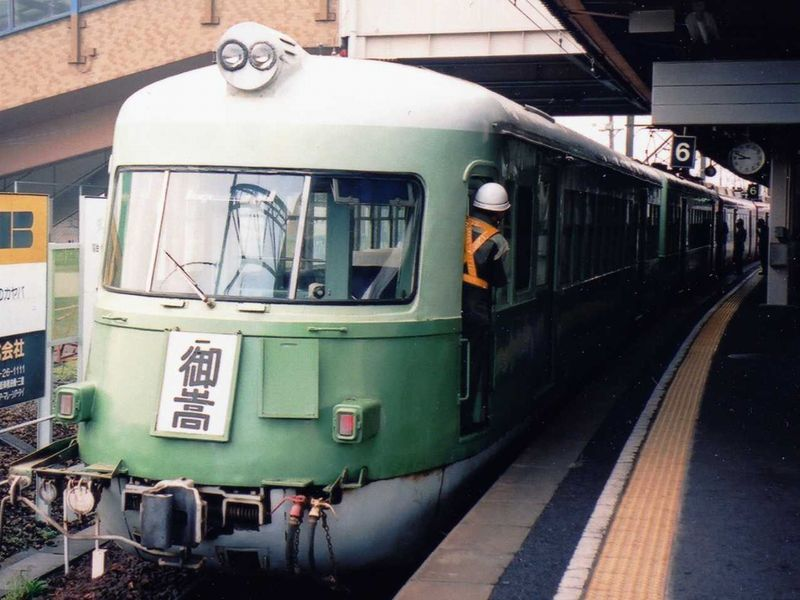
The new set 3401 after the repaint

The initial six cars from 1937 was refurbished between 1967 and 1968. All cars were painted scarlet in 1976. After the establishment of Central Japan Railway Company (JR Central) from the privatization of Japanese National Railways, JR Central began to improve the service frequency and increase the convenience of the Tōkaidō Main Line, which partially ran alongside Meitetsu Nagoya Main Line. Meitetsu introduced the 6500 series and 6800 series from 1987 to 1989 to compete, rendering the older rolling stock obsolete. Two sets were scrapped in 1988, and the remaining set 3403 was reduced to two cars. The set 3403 was renumbered to set 3401. Although the new set 3401 was planned to be scrapped some years later, it was awarded the Evergreen Award in 1993 by the Japan Railfan Club, which is given to trains that have served a long time. Meitetsu decided to preserve the new set 3401 and repaint the set back to its original livery following this award. However, no colored images of the original livery existed, requiring the company to ask people who remember it. The lower half of the set was painted green, while the upper half was painted light green. The repainted new set 3401 was first used in a reserved train between Higashi Okazaki and Kō Station for the award ceremony of the Evergreen Award. Air conditioners were installed in 1994 to maintain service standards. 1994 was also the 100th year since the formation of Meitetsu, and the new set 3401 was temporarily ran for a rapid service between Hekinan and Yatomi to celebrate it for the entirety of August that year.

Due to difficulty in finding old upkeep parts, aging of the train itself, and the economic depression at the time, the train was removed from regular services in October 2001. Although the set was used in reserved services after the removal, it was announced that the set would officially retire at the end of August 2002. The back car of the set was scrapped at Meiden-Chikko in 2006. The last car is preserved in Okazaki, and can be seen in an event.

== Design ==
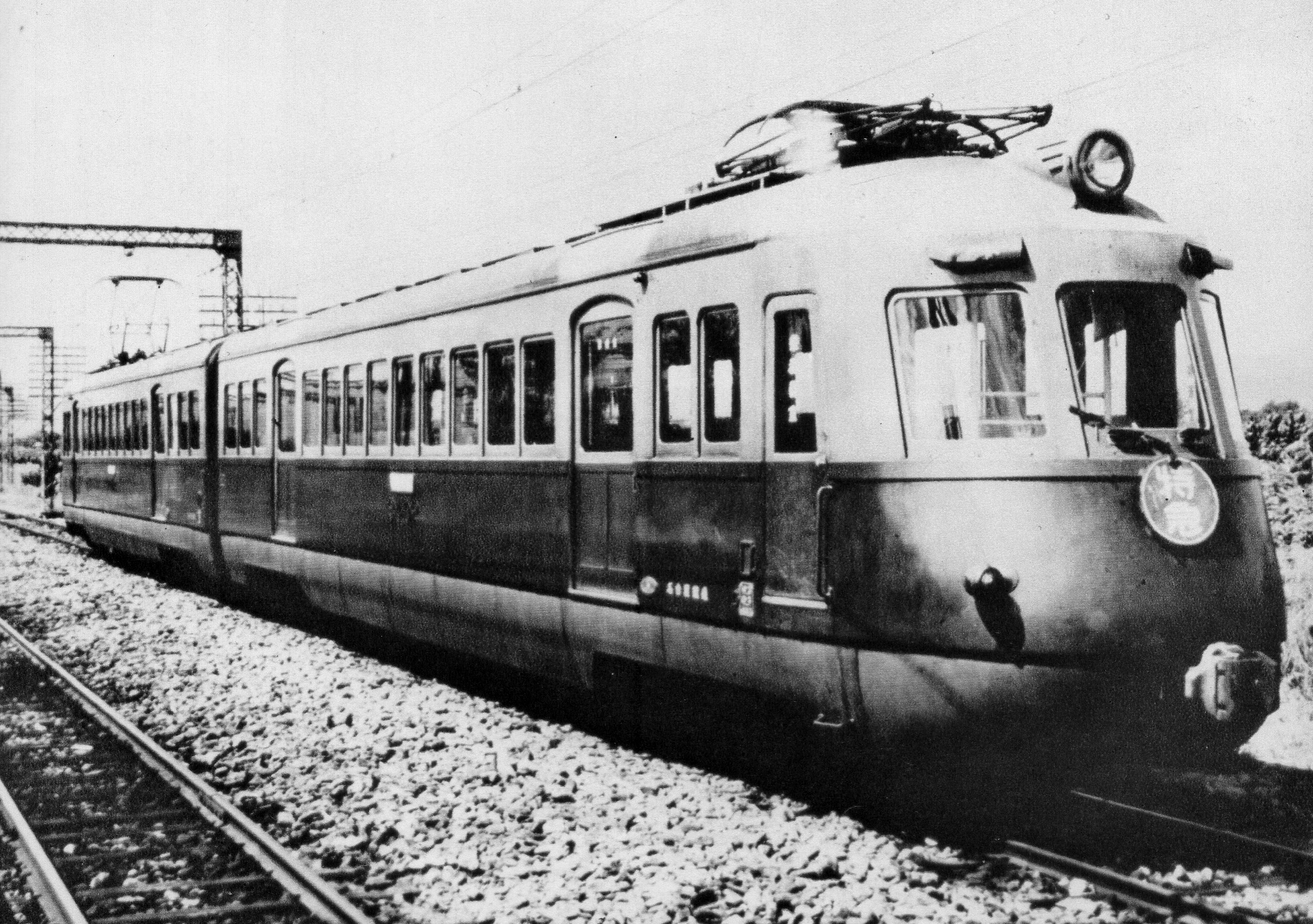
3400 series in its first years

The train was designed as the first new train by Meitetsu, which was formed from merger between Aichi Electric Railways and Meiki Railways in 1935. The streamliner design adopted by the 3400 series was also common used with other Japanese train cars at the time, such as JNR Class EF55, 52 series, and KiHa 43000. Three 2-car sets were deployed in eastern lines formerly owned by Aichi Electric Railways in March 1937, and the 850 series with the similar streamliner design was deployed in the western lines formerly owned by Meiki Railways.

=== Refurbishment ===
The refurbishment from March 1967 changed many features of the trains. The train's body was changed to be fully made out of metal, and the doors were made slightly narrower from 1,200 to 1,100 mm (47 to 43 in). Some seats near the doors were rotated sideways. Panels were added to the inner walls of the train cars, and modifications were made in the tail lights and the front glasses of the cars. After the trains were reduced to 2-car sets, the pantographs of the last car of the set was removed entirely.
