= NS 3400 =

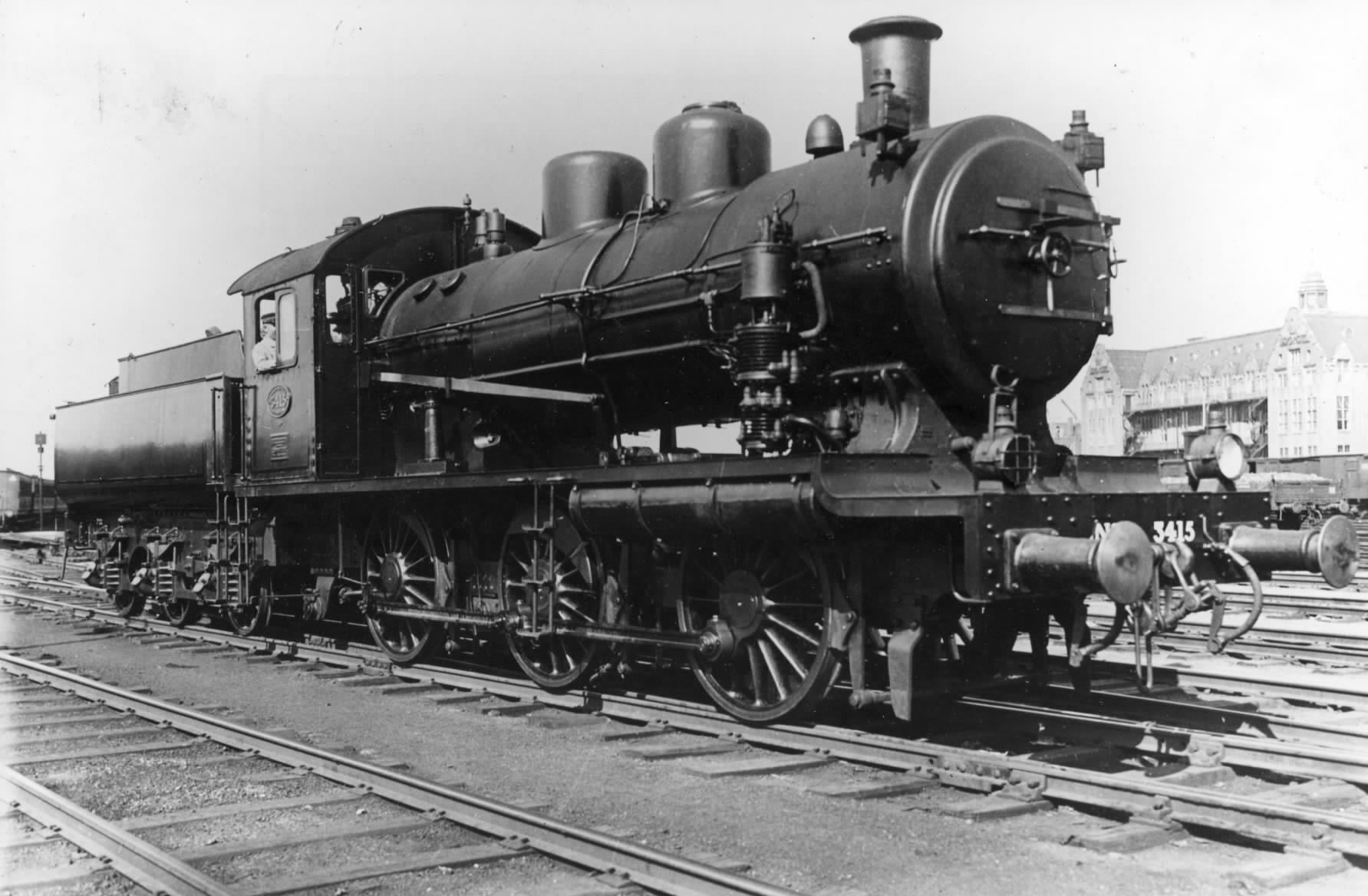
- NS 3415 at the yard of Amsterdam Rietlanden (1920-1940)
Type and origin
- Power type: Steam
- Builder: Berliner Maschinenbau
- Build date: 1921
- Total produced: 20
Specifications
- Configuration
  - Whyte: 0-6-0
  - UIC: C
- Gauge: 1,435 mm (4 ft 8 1/2 in)
- Driver dia.: 1,524 mm (5 ft 0 in)
- Tender wheels: 1,105 mm (3 ft 7.5 in)
- Length: 16,920 mm (55 ft 6 in)
- Height: 4,370 mm (14 ft 4 in)
- Loco weight: 53.5 t (59.0 short tons; 52.7 long tons)
- Tender weight: 42 t (46 short tons; 41 long tons)
- Fuel type: Coal
- Fuel capacity: 6 metric tons (6.6 short tons; 5.9 long tons)
- Water cap.: 17 m^{3} (3,700 imp gal)
- Firebox
  - Grate area: 2.20 m^{2} (23.7 sq ft)
- Boiler pressure: 12.4 bar (180 psi)
- Heating surface
  - Firebox: 12 m^{2} (130 sq ft)
  - Tubes: 84 m^{2} (900 sq ft)
- Superheater
  - Heating area: 27 m^{2} (290 sq ft)
- Cylinders: 2
- Cylinder size: 500 mm × 610 mm (20 in × 24 in)
- Valve gear: Stephenson
- Loco brake: Air brake
Performance figures
- Maximum speed: 75 km/h (47 mph)
- Tractive effort: 85.42 kN (19,200 lbf)
Career
- Operators: NS, HSM
- Power class: (HSM: GV^{2}); NS: GO^{2}
- Numbers: (HSM: 821-840); NS: 4101-4120; Later: 3401-3420
- Nicknames: Wilde Varkens (Wild Pigs)
- Withdrawn: 1947-1953
- Disposition: All scrapped

The NS 3400 was a series of goods steam locomotives of the Dutch Railways (NS), ordered by its predecessor the Hollandsche IJzeren Spoorweg-Maatschappij (HSM).

Around 1920, the HSM ordered a goods version of the class 501-535 from the factory Berliner Maschinenbau (formerly Schwartzkopff) in Berlin, to be delivered as the class 821–840. Due to the merging of the fleet of the HSM and the SS in 1921, the locomotives were delivered with the NS numbers 4101–4120. In the same year, the locomotives were renumbered in the definitive numbering as series 3401–3420. During the Second World War, three quarters of the series (3401–3412, 3415, 3419 and 3420) were deported to Germany, of which thirteen returned. The 3411 and 3420 did not return and were administratively removed in 1950. NS 3420 was still shunting in Rostock until 1950.

In 1951, NS 3411 and 3420 were scrapped in Hagenow-Land. Of the five locomotives that remained in the Netherlands, two were sold and six of the returned thirteen locomotives were repaired and put back into service. Until 1953, these served mainly in the Rietlanden and for the oil trains from Schoonebeek to Pernis. The locomotives that were beyond repair were withdrawn in 1947.

Factory number	Entered service	HSM Number	First NS number	Second NS number	Withdrawn	Remarks
7296	1921	821	4101	3401	1947	Taken to Germany, scrapped after being returned due to war damage
7297	1921	822	4102	3402	1947	Taken to Germany, scrapped after being returned due to war damage
7298	1921	823	4103	3403	1953	Taken to Germany, scrapped after being returned due to war damage
7299	1921	824	4104	3404	1947	Taken to Germany, scrapped after being returned due to war damage
7300	1921	825	4105	3405	1947	Taken to Germany, scrapped after being returned due to war damage
7301	1921	826	4106	3406	1947	Taken to Germany, scrapped after being returned due to war damage
7302	1921	827	4107	3407	1947	Taken to Germany, scrapped after being returned due to war damage
7303	1921	828	4108	3408	1953	Taken to Germany, scrapped after being returned due to war damage
7304	1921	829	4109	3409	1950	Taken to Germany, scrapped after being returned due to war damage
7305	1921	830	4110	3410	1953	Taken to Germany, scrapped after being returned due to war damage
7306	1921	831	4111	3411	1951	Taken to Germany, reported as missing. Scrapped in 1951 in Hagenow-Land.
7307	1921	832	4112	3412	1953	Taken to Germany, scrapped after being returned due to war damage
7308	1921	833	4113	3413	1949	Repaired from its war damage
7309	1921	834	4114	3414	1947	Scrapped due to war damage
7310	1921	835	4115	3415	1953	Taken to Germany, scrapped after being returned due to war damage
7311	1921	836	4116	3416	1947	Scrapped due to war damage
7312	1921	837	4117	3417	1950	Scrapped due to war damage
7313	1921	838	4118	3418	1947	Scrapped due to war damage
7314	1921	839	4119	3419	1947	Taken to Germany, repaired from war damage after being returned.
7315	1921	840	4120	3420	1951	Taken to Germany, reported as missing. Scrapped in 1951 in Hagenow-Land.

== Gallery ==
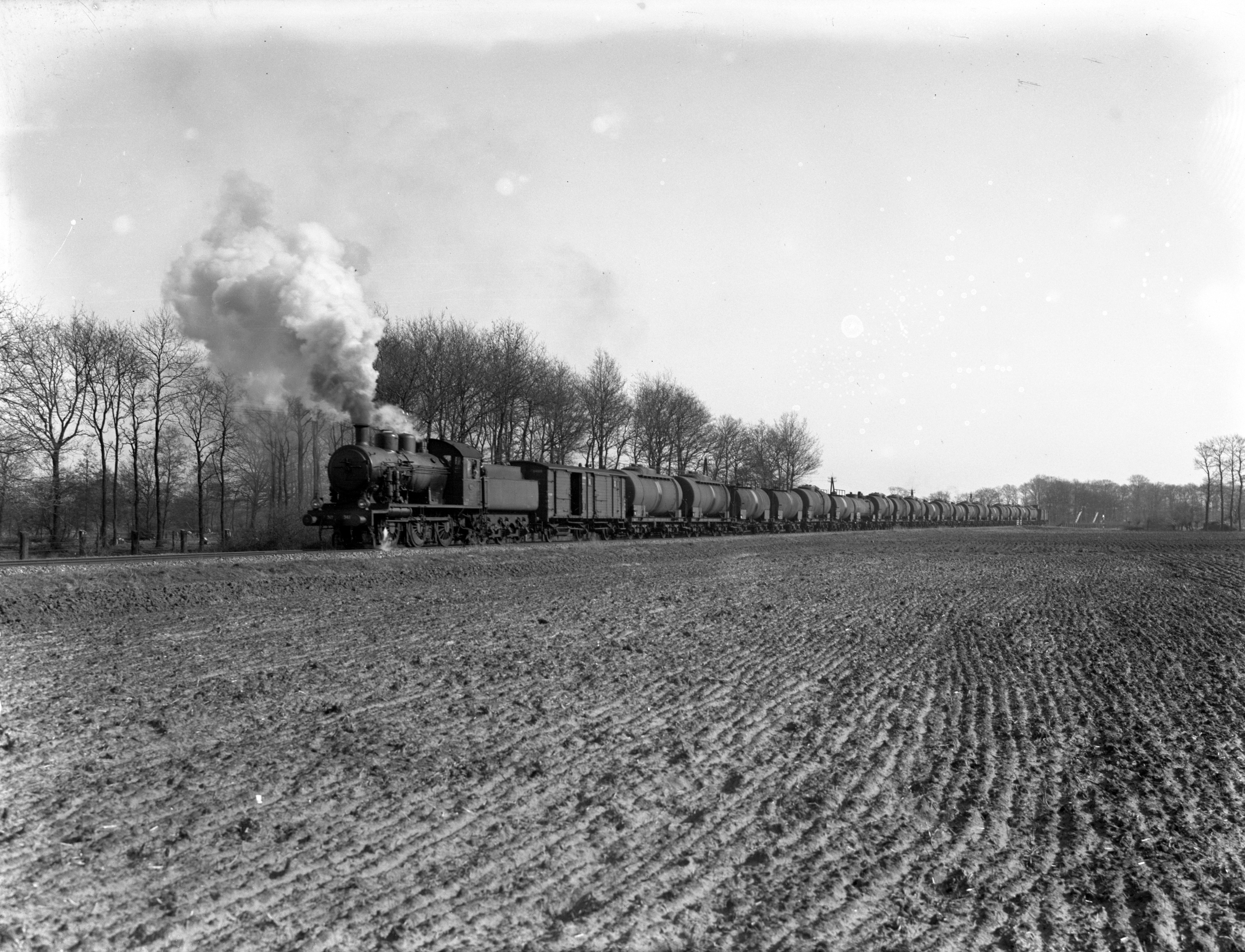
A steam locomotive from the series 3400 of the N.S. with an oil train near Dalfsen. (1951)

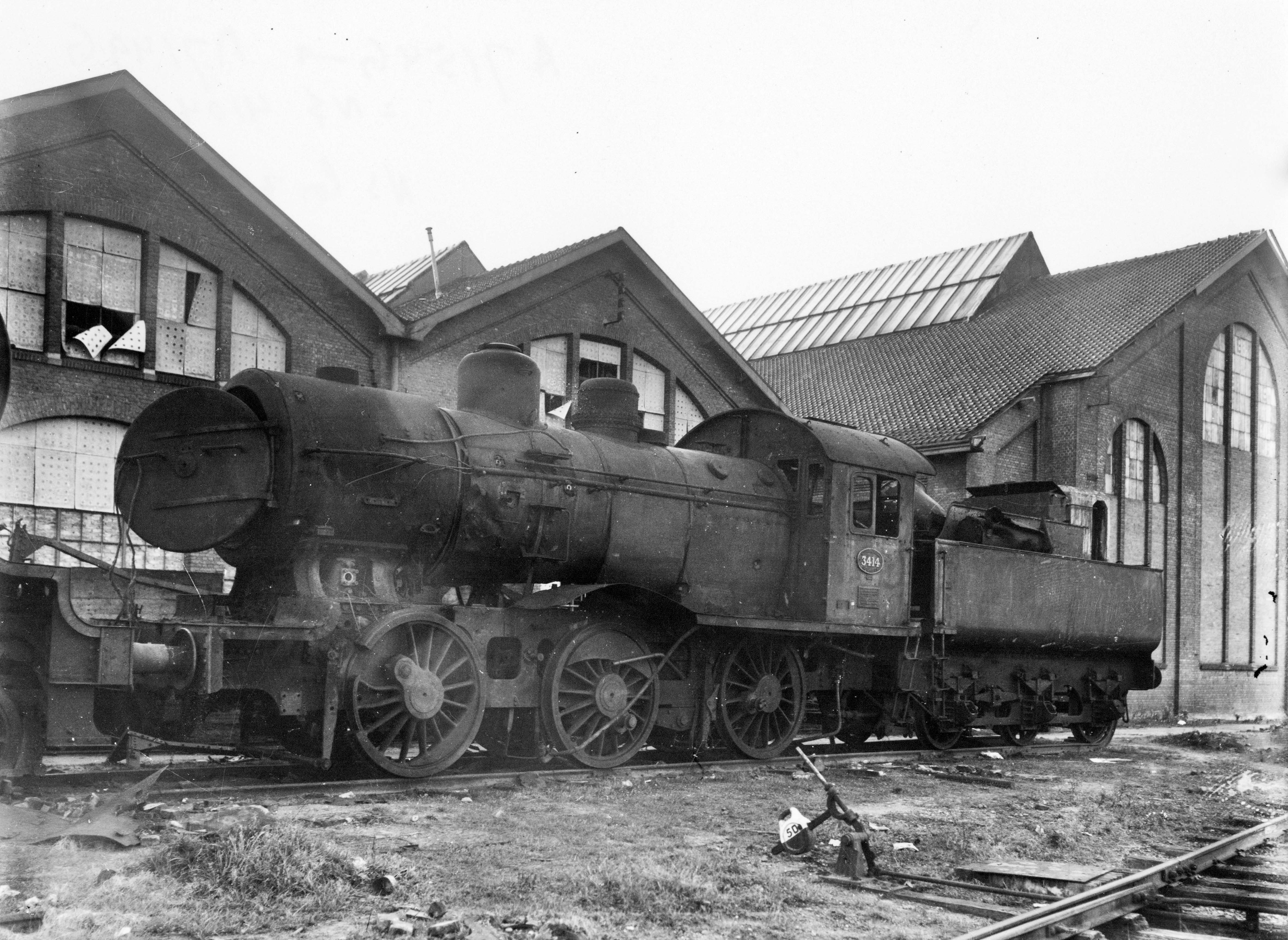
Steam locomotive NS 3414 destroyed during the war at the central workshop in Zwolle (1946)

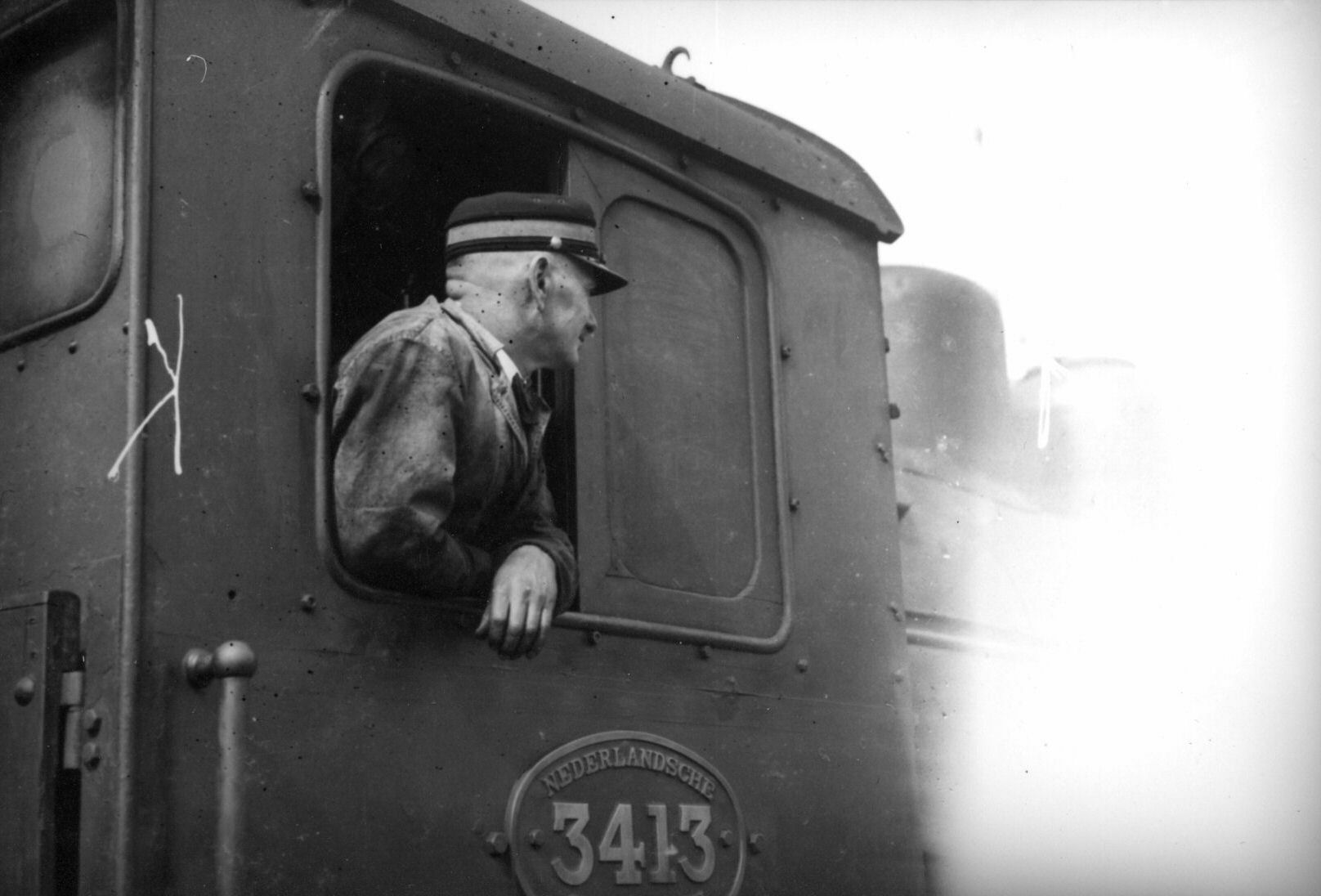
Driver in the cab of the steam locomotive NS 3413. (Between 1925 and 1935)

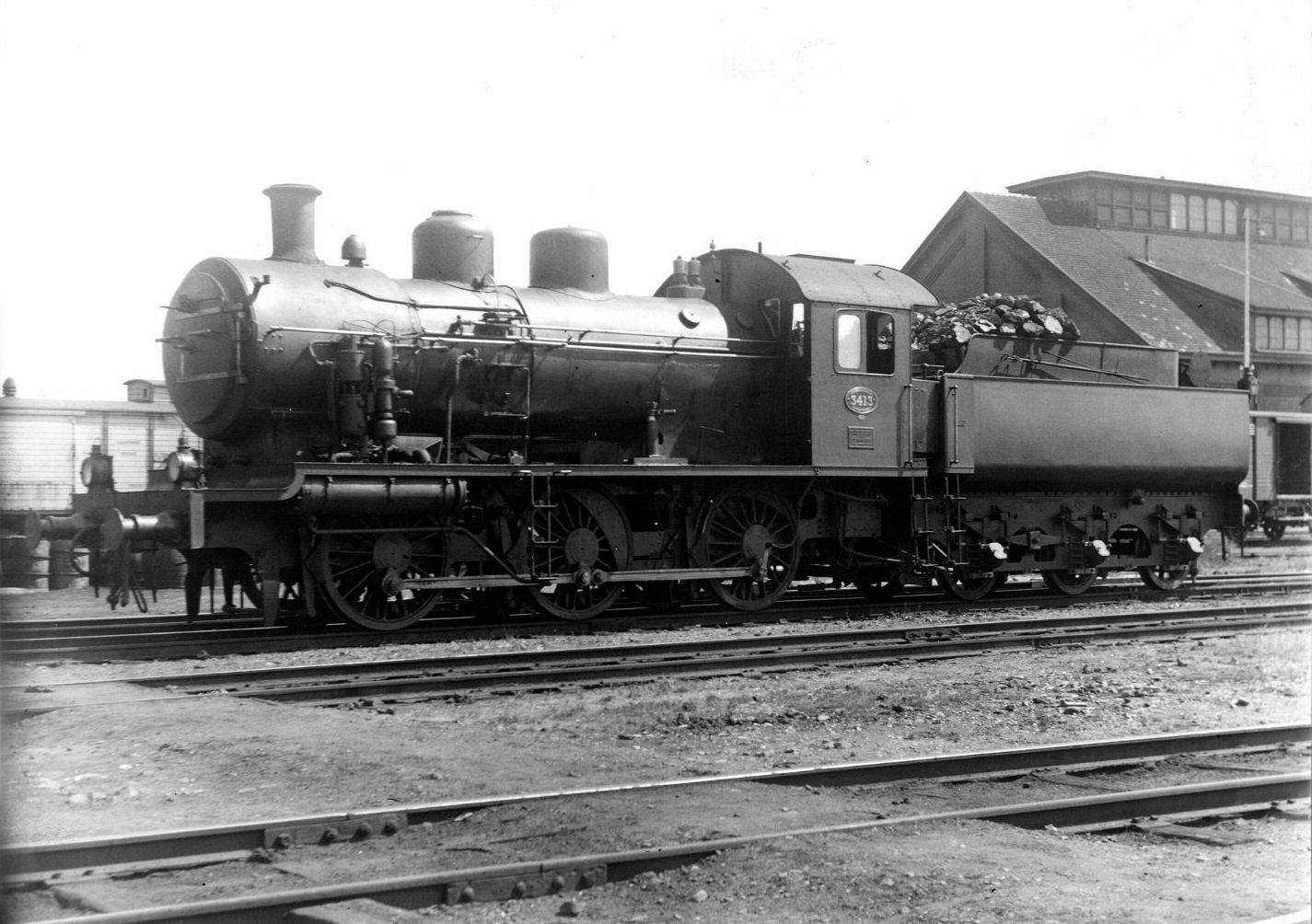
NS 3413 presumably in Amsterdam Rietlanden (Between 1925 and 1935)

== Sources and references ==
- Waldorp, H. (1981). Onze Nederlandse stoomlocomotieven in woord en beeld. Alkmaar: De Alk. pp. 21–22. ISBN 90-6013-909-7.
- R.C. Statius Muller, A.J. Veenendaal jr., H. Waldorp (2005). De Nederlandse stoomlocomotieven. Alkmaar: De Alk. ISBN 90-6013-262-9.
- van der Meer, Jacq. (2009). De Hollandsche IJzeren Spoorweg-Maatschappij. Rosmalen: Uquilair. ISBN 978-90-71513-68-8.
- "Het Utrechts archief".
