= Panorama Car =

Trainset series in Nagoya, Japan

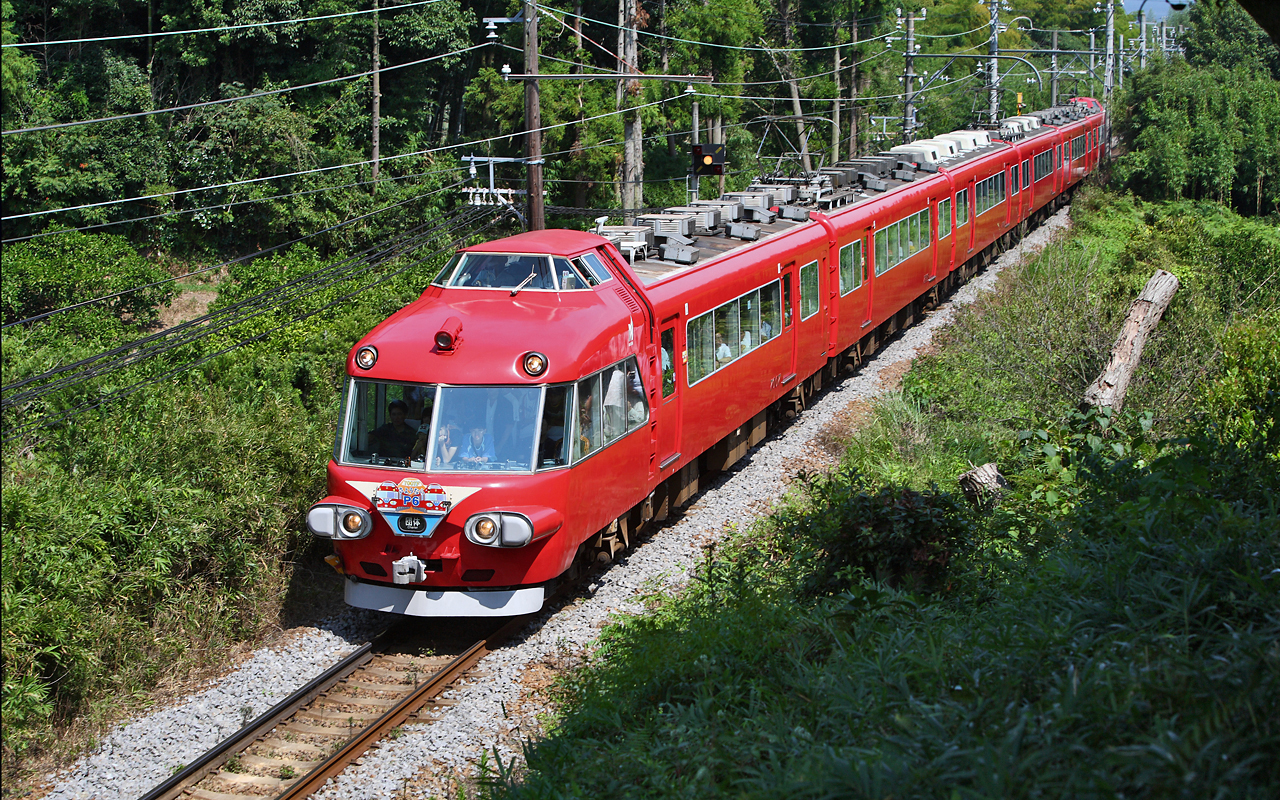
Original 7000 series Panorama Car

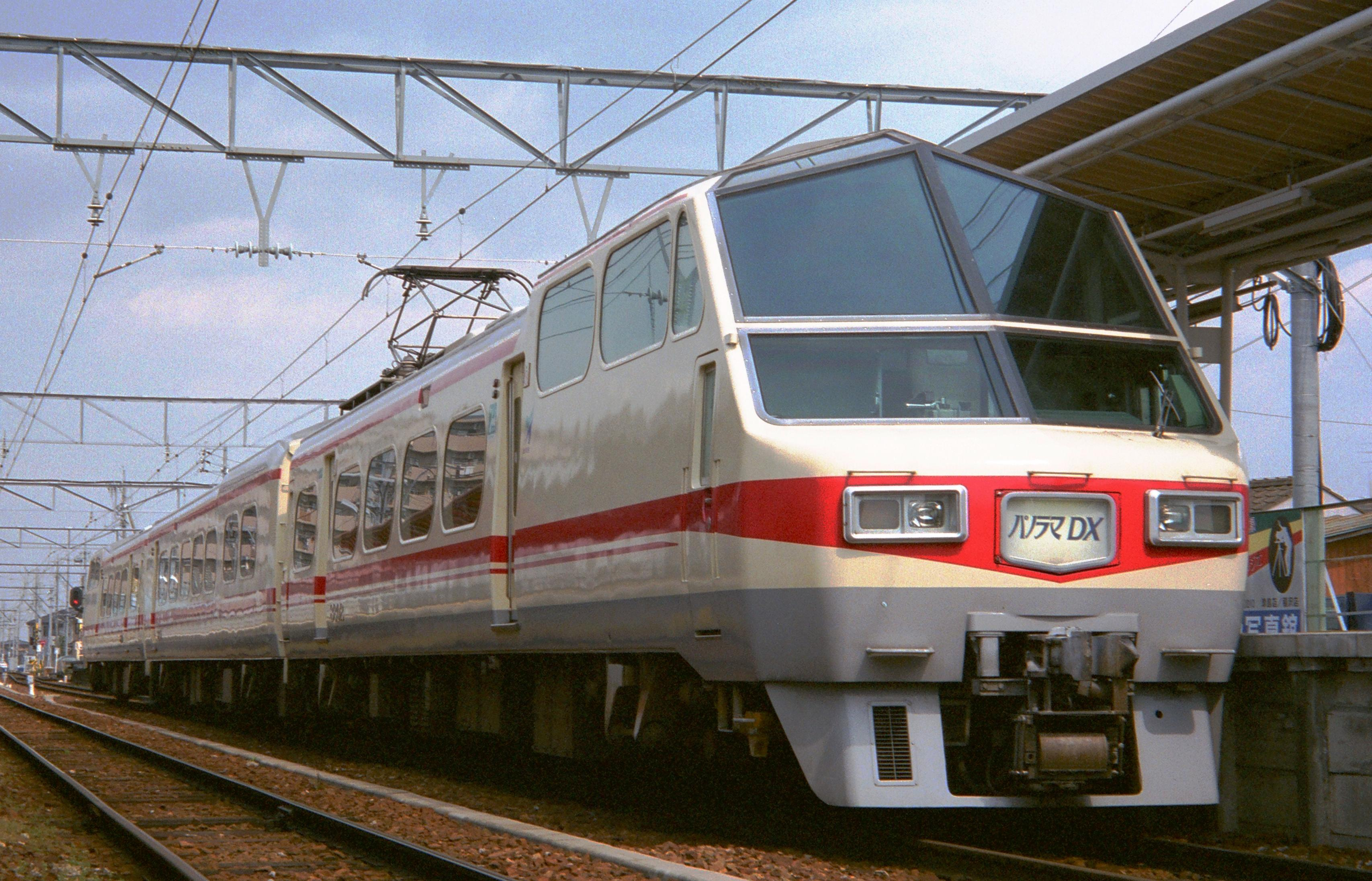
8800 series Panorama DX

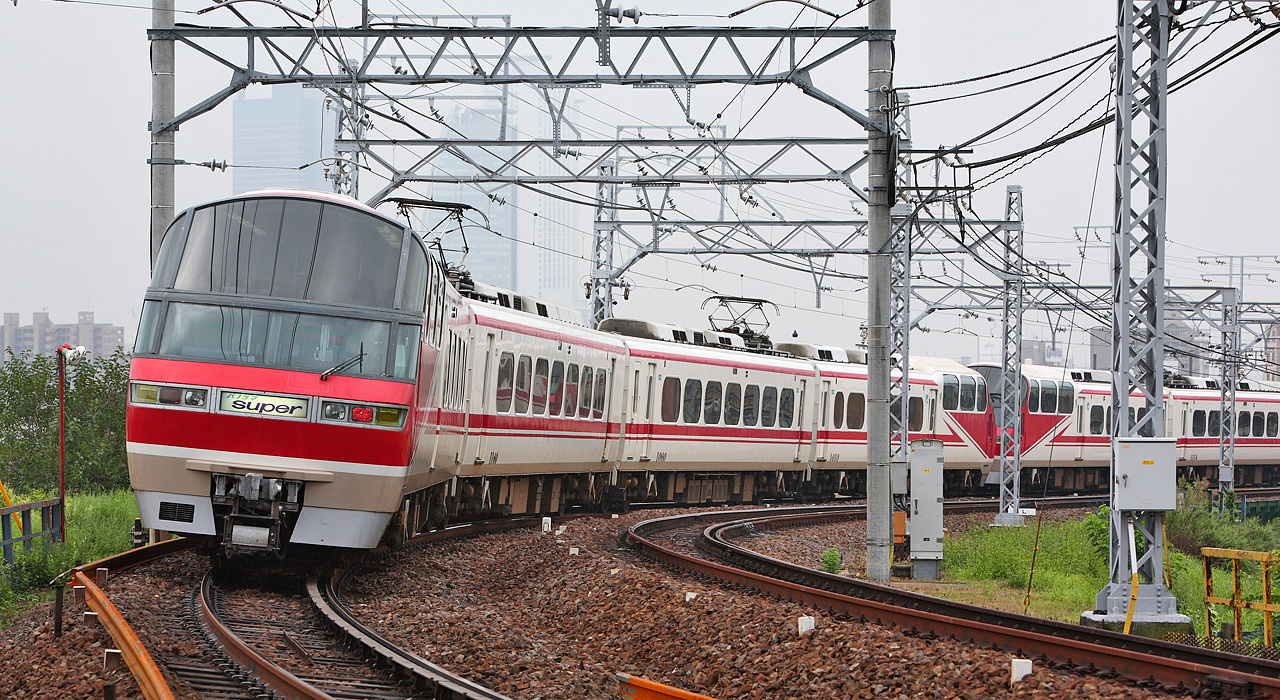
1000 series Panorama Super

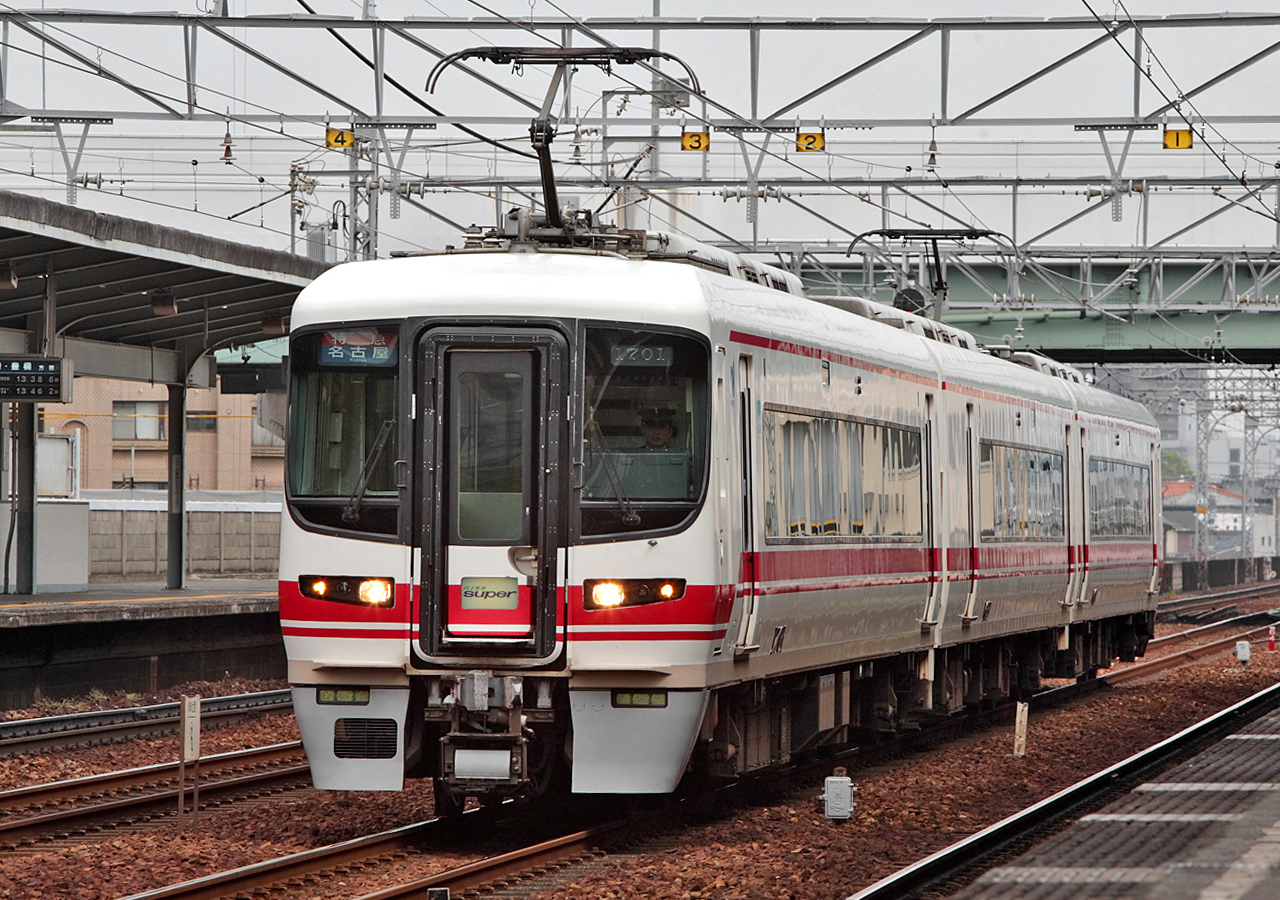
1600 series Panorama Super

Panorama Car (パノラマカー, Panoramakā) is a trainset series operated by Nagoya Railroad, including the Panorama Super (パノラマスーパー). Like the Romancecar trains of Odakyu Electric Railway, they are designed to be tourist oriented limited express trains, although they also operate on Rapid Limited Express (快速特急, Kaisoku Tokkyū) services.

The very first Panorama Car was the 7000 series in 1961, and featured Japan's first 180 degree "Panoramic" seating view. Then came the 8800 series Panorama DX in 1984, followed by the 1000 series Panorama Super and its sister, the 1600 series, launched in 1999.

== See also ==
- Observation car
- Vistadome
