= Meitetsu 7000 series =

Japanese train type

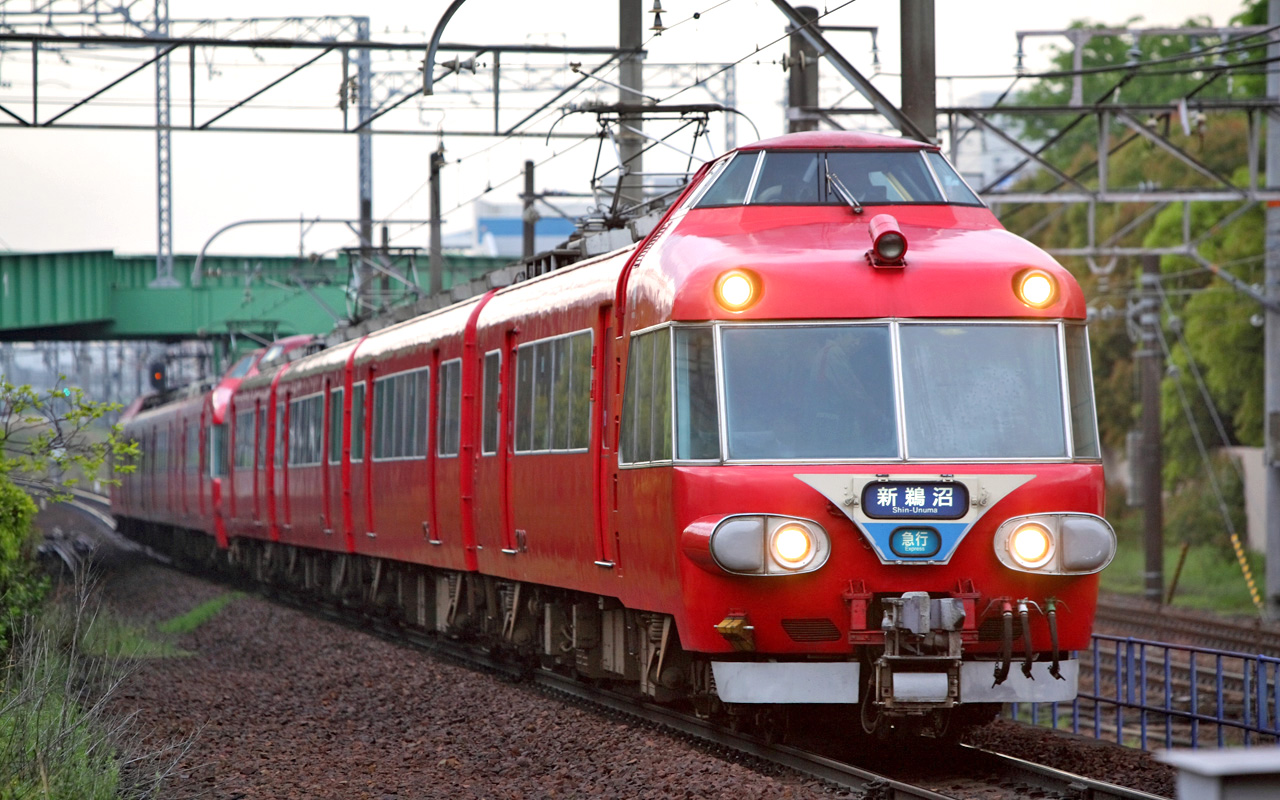
- Meitetsu 7000 series

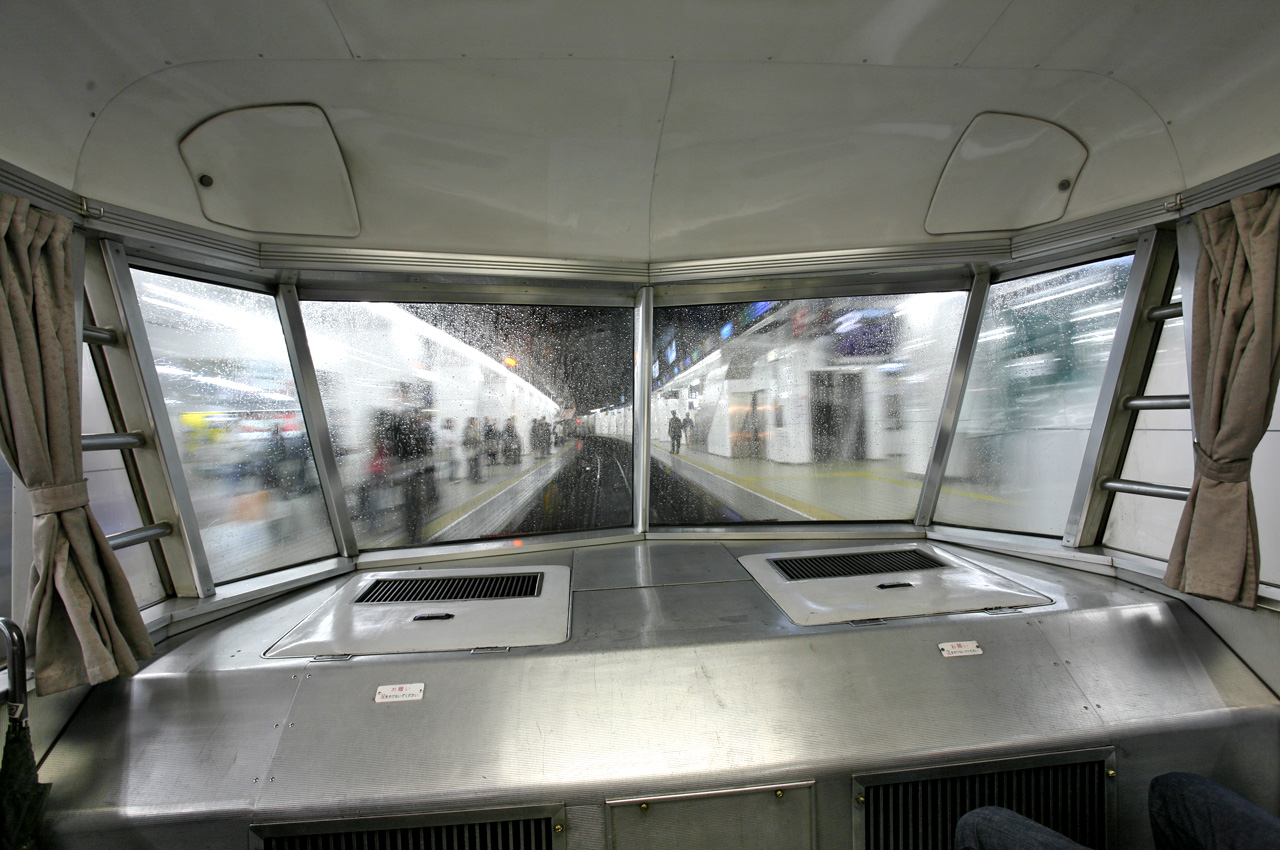
- View from the observation deck seats of the Meitetsu 7000 series
- In service: 1 June 1961-26 December 2009
- Manufacturer: Nippon Sharyo
- Replaced: Meitetsu 3400 series (Limited Express services)
- Constructed: 1961–1975
- Number built: 116 cars
- Number preserved: 5 cars
- Formation: 2/4/6/8/10 cars per trainset
- Operator: Meitetsu

Specifications
- Electric system: 1,500 V DC overhead catenary
- Safety system: Meitetsu ATS
- Track gauge: 1,067 mm (3 ft 6 in)

Notes/references
- This train won the 5th Blue Ribbon Award in 1962.

The Meitetsu 7000 series (名鉄7000系) was a commuter electric multiple unit (EMU) train type formerly operated by the private railway operator Nagoya Railroad (Meitetsu) in Japan from 1961 until December 2009. The 7000 series included the 7100 series, 7500 series, and 7700 series.

== Preserved examples ==
- Cars 7027, 7092 and 7028 are preserved at Chukyo Racecourse.
- Cars 7001 and 7002 are preserved at Maigi inspection center.
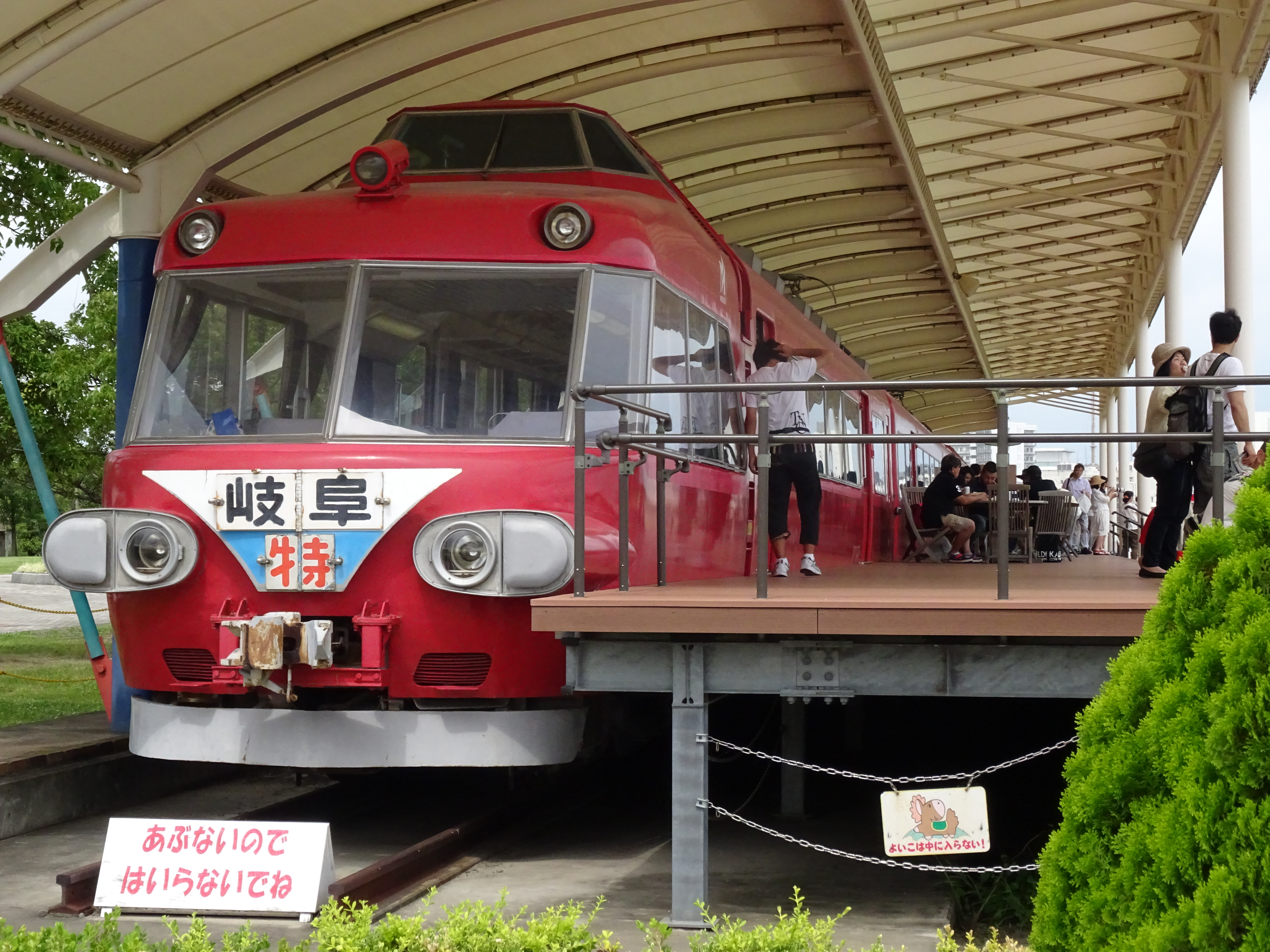
7000 series at Chukyo Racecourse in July 2016
