= Meitetsu DeKi 600 =

Japanese electric locomotive type

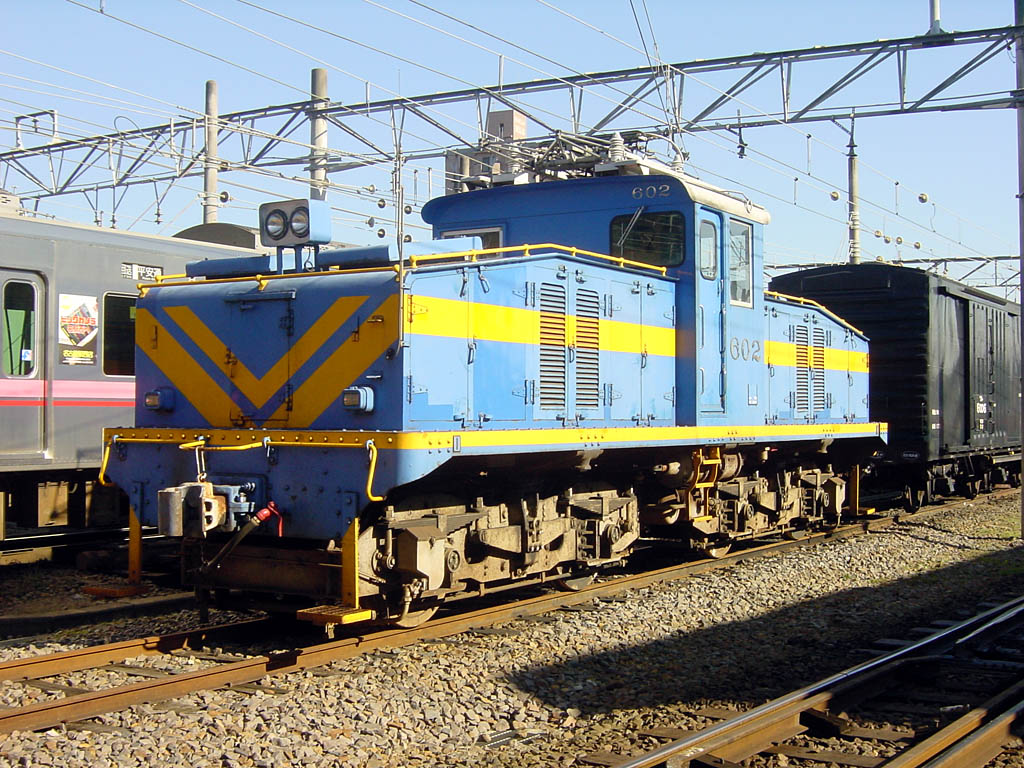
- DeKi 602 in December 2003
Type and origin
- Power type: Electric
- Builder: Toshiba
- Build date: 1943–1945
- Total produced: 4
Specifications
- Configuration
  - UIC: Bo-Bo
- Gauge: 1,067 mm (3 ft 6 in)
- Length: 11,050 mm (36 ft 3 in)
- Width: 2,865 mm (9 ft 4.8 in)
- Height: 4,050 mm (13 ft 3 in)
- Loco weight: 40.0 t
- Electric system/s: 1,500 V DC
- Current pickup(s): overhead wire
- Traction motors: 110 kW x 4
Performance figures
- Power output: 440 kW
Career
- Operators: Meitetsu
- Numbers: DeKi 601-604
- Locale: Aichi Prefecture
- Withdrawn: July 2015
- Scrapped: 2015
- Disposition: All scrapped

The Meitetsu DeKi 600 (名鉄デキ600形, Meitetsu Deki 600-gata) was a Bo-Bo wheel arrangement electric locomotive type operated by private railway operator Nagoya Railroad (Meitetsu) in Japan from 1943 until 2015.

== Operations ==
Originally used to haul freight trains, they were later used primarily on track maintenance trains and rolling stock transfer duties. As of 1 April 2015, all four locomotives were still in service, but the locomotives were withdrawn and cut up during fiscal 2015 following the introduction of new Class EL120 locomotives. Locomotives 601 and 602 were normally based at Inuyama Depot, and 603 and 604 were normally based at Shinkawa Depot.

== History ==
The four locomotives were built by Toshiba between 1943 and 1945.

Locomotives DeKi 603 and 604 were originally built as locomotive numbers E401 and E402 for use on the Japanese-occupied island of Hainan during World War II, but were ultimately not able to be shipped abroad, and were instead purchased by Meitetsu.

Originally painted in black with yellow and black chevrons at the ends, the locomotives were repainted into "Meitetsu Blue" when they underwent life extension refurbishment in 1992.

All four locomotives were withdrawn in July 2015, and cut up.
