= Meitetsu Class EL120 =

Class of 2 Japanese electric locomotives

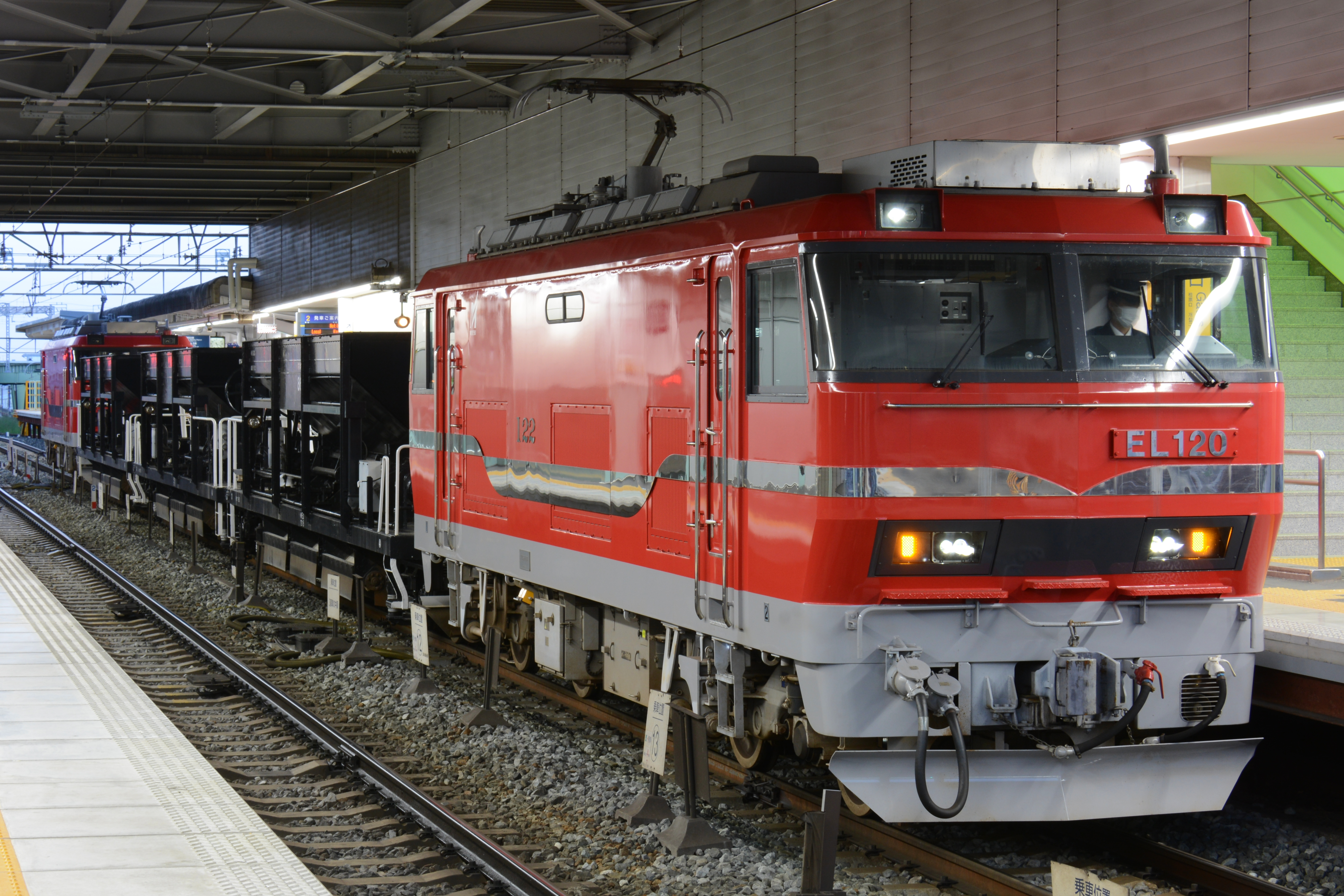
- Locomotive 122 in April 2015
Type and origin
- Power type: Electric
- Builder: Toshiba
- Build date: 2015
- Total produced: 2
Specifications
- Configuration
  - UIC: Bo-Bo
- Gauge: 1,067 mm (3 ft 6 in)
- Length: 12,000 mm (39 ft 4 in)
- Width: 2,731 mm (8 ft 11.5 in)
- Loco weight: 39.8 t
- Electric system/s: 1,500 V DC
- Current pickup: overhead wire
- Safety systems: Meitetsu ATS
Performance figures
- Maximum speed: 100 km/h (60 mph)
- Power output: 760 kW (1,020 hp)
Career
- Operators: Meitetsu
- Number in class: 2
- Numbers: 121-122
- Locale: Aichi Prefecture
- Delivered: 1 February 2015
- Disposition: Operational

The Meitetsu Class EL120 (名鉄EL120形) is a Bo-Bo wheel arrangement DC electric locomotive type operated by the private railway operator Meitetsu in Aichi Prefecture, Japan, since 2015. The two locomotives, numbered 121 and 122, replaced the fleet of Meitetsu's two DeKi 400 and four DeKi 600 locomotives during fiscal 2015.

== History ==
The two locomotives 121 and 122 were delivered from the Toshiba factory in Fuchu, Tokyo to Meitetsu's Maigi Maintenance Depot on 1 February 2015.
