= Meitetsu DeKi 400 =

Japanese electric locomotive type

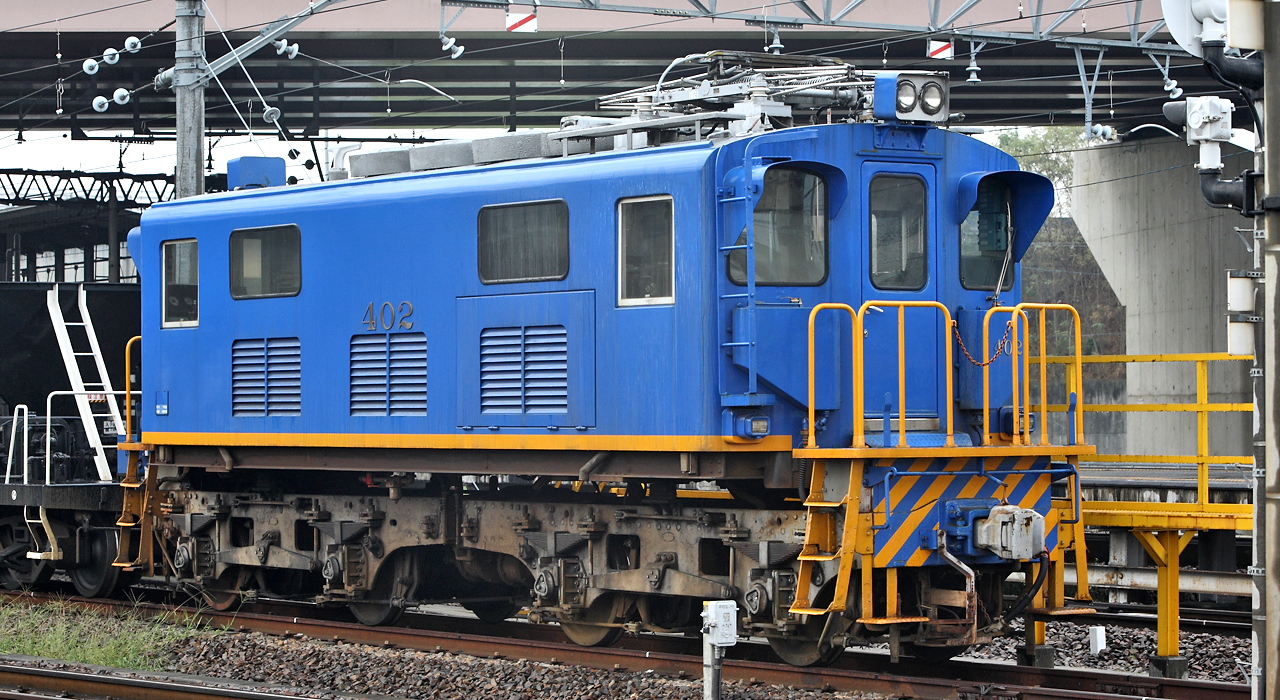
- DeKi 402 in September 2008
Type and origin
- Power type: Electric
- Builder: Nippon Sharyo, Westinghouse
- Build date: 1930-1931
- Total produced: 2
Specifications
- Configuration
  - UIC: Bo-Bo
- Gauge: 1,067 mm (3 ft 6 in)
- Length: 11,052 mm (36 ft 3.1 in)
- Width: 2,700 mm (8 ft 10 in)
- Height: 4,120 mm (13 ft 6 in)
- Loco weight: 40.0 t
- Electric system/s: 1,500 V DC
- Current pickup(s): overhead wire
- Traction motors: WH-576-JF-6 (93.25 kW x 4)
Performance figures
- Power output: 360 kW
Career
- Operators: Meitetsu
- Number in class: 2
- Numbers: DeKi 401-402
- Locale: Aichi Prefecture
- Disposition: Withdrawn

The Meitetsu DeKi 400 (名鉄デキ400形, Meitetsu Deki 400-gata) was a Bo-Bo wheel arrangement electric locomotive type operated by private railway operator Nagoya Railroad (Meitetsu) in Japan.

== Operations ==
Originally used to haul freight trains on the eastern end of the Meitetsu Nagoya Main Line and Meitetsu Mikawa Line, they were later used primarily on track maintenance trains and rolling stock transfer duties.

== History ==
The two locomotives were built in 1930 and 1931 for the Aichi Electric Railroad, numbered DeKi 400 and DeKi 401. The locomotive bodies were built by Nippon Sharyo of Japan, and the electrical equipment was built by the American company Westinghouse Electric Company. When the Aichi Electric Railroad was absorbed into Meitetsu, the two locomotives retained their original DeKi 400 classification, but locomotive number DeKi 400 was renumbered DeKi 402.

Originally painted in black, the locomotives were repainted into "Meitetsu Blue" when they underwent life extension refurbishment in 1993. The locomotives were originally fitted with two large Westinghouse pantographs, but these were subsequently replaced by single PT42-F lozenge-type pantographs.

=== Withdrawal ===
The DeKi 400 locomotives were withdrawn during fiscal 2015, replaced by new Class EL120 locomotives, and cut up in June 2016.
