= List of cities in Aichi Prefecture by population =

The following list sorts all cities (including towns and villages) in the Japanese prefecture of Aichi with a population of more than 10,000 according to the 2020 Census. As of October 1, 2020, 50 places fulfill this criterion and are listed here. This list refers only to the population of individual cities, towns and villages within their defined limits, which does not include other municipalities or suburban areas within urban agglomerations.

== List ==
The following table lists the 50 cities, towns and villages in Aichi with a population of at least 10,000 on October 1, 2020, according to the 2020 Census. The table also gives an overview of the evolution of the population since the 1995 census.

Rank (2020)	Name	Status	2020	2015	2010	2005	2000	1995
1	Nagoya	City	2,333,406	2,295,638	2,263,894	2,215,062	2,171,557	2,152,184
2	Toyota	City	422,511	422,542	421,487	412,141	395,224	383,800
3	Okazaki	City	384,805	381,051	372,357	363,807	345,997	332,136
4	Ichinomiya	City	379,981	380,868	378,566	371,687	362,726	353,999
5	Toyohashi	City	372,134	374,765	376,665	372,479	364,856	352,982
6	Kasugai	City	308,832	306,508	305,569	295,802	287,623	277,589
7	Anjō	City	188,512	184,140	178,691	170,250	158,824	149,464
8	Toyokawa	City	184,659	182,436	181,928	181,444	176,698	172,509
9	Nishio	City	169,127	167,990	165,298	163,232	159,788	158,693
10	Kariya	City	153,926	149,765	145,781	142,134	132,054	125,305
11	Komaki	City	149,033	149,462	147,132	147,182	143,122	137,165
12	Inazawa	City	134,738	136,867	136,358	136,965	136,938	135,080
13	Seto	City	127,869	129,046	132,224	131,925	131,650	129,393
14	Handa	City	117,925	116,908	118,828	115,845	110,837	106,452
15	Tōkai	City	113,838	111,944	107,690	104,339	99,921	99,738
16	Kōnan	City	98,284	98,359	99,730	99,055	97,923	95,521
17	Ōbu	City	93,154	89,157	85,249	80,262	75,273	73,096
18	Nisshin	City	91,566	87,977	84,237	78,591	70,188	60,311
19	Kitanagoya	City	86,447	84,133	81,571	78,078	75,728	73,870
20	Ama	City	86,185	86,898	86,714	85,307	82,321	78,678
21	Chita	City	84,371	84,617	84,768	83,373	80,536	78,202
22	Owariasahi	City	83,182	80,787	81,140	78,394	75,066	70,073
23	Gamagōri	City	79,501	81,100	82,249	82,108	82,108	83,730
24	Inuyama	City	73,122	74,308	75,198	74,294	72,583	71,342
25	Hekinan	City	72,528	71,346	72,018	71,408	67,814	66,956
26	Chiryū	City	72,248	70,501	68,398	66,085	62,587	58,578
27	Toyoake	City	69,312	69,127	69,745	68,285	66,495	64,869
28	Kiyosu	City	67,464	67,327	65,841	63,358	63,009	62,738
29	Miyoshi	City	61,965	61,810	60,098	56,252	47,684	39,920
30	Tsushima	City	60,958	63,431	65,258	65,547	65,422	63,723
31	Aisai	City	60,839	63,088	64,978	65,556	65,597	64,216
32	Nagakute	City	60,112	57,598	52,022	46,493	43,306	38,490
33	Tahara	City	59,379	62,364	64,119	66,390	65,534	65,243
34	Tokoname	City	58,735	56,547	54,858	51,265	50,183	50,854
35	Higashiura	Town	49,659	49,230	49,800	48,046	45,168	42,409
36	Iwakura	City	48,003	47,562	47,340	47,926	46,906	46,175
37	Takahama	City	46,064	46,236	44,027	41,351	38,127	36,029
38	Shinshiro	City	44,382	47,133	49,864	52,178	53,603	54,602
39	Tōgō	Town	44,128	42,858	41,851	39,384	36,878	32,172
40	Taketoyo	Town	43,565	42,473	42,408	40,981	39,993	38,153
41	Yatomi	City	43,001	43,269	43,272	42,575	42,179	41,309
42	Kōta	Town	42,479	39,549	37,930	35,596	33,408	32,711
43	Kanie	Town	37,351	37,085	36,688	36,750	36,240	36,366
44	Fusō	Town	34,136	33,806	33,558	32,535	31,728	30,254
45	Ōharu	Town	32,403	30,990	29,891	28,501	27,073	24,724
46	Agui	Town	28,400	27,747	25,466	24,577	24,028	23,890
47	Ōguchi	Town	24,262	23,274	22,446	21,602	20,633	19,031
48	Mihama	Town	22,491	23,575	25,178	26,294	26,083	26,076
49	Minamichita	Town	16,621	18,707	20,549	21,909	23,250	24,846
50	Toyoyama	Town	15,615	15,177	14,405	13,565	13,001	13,513

== Gallery ==
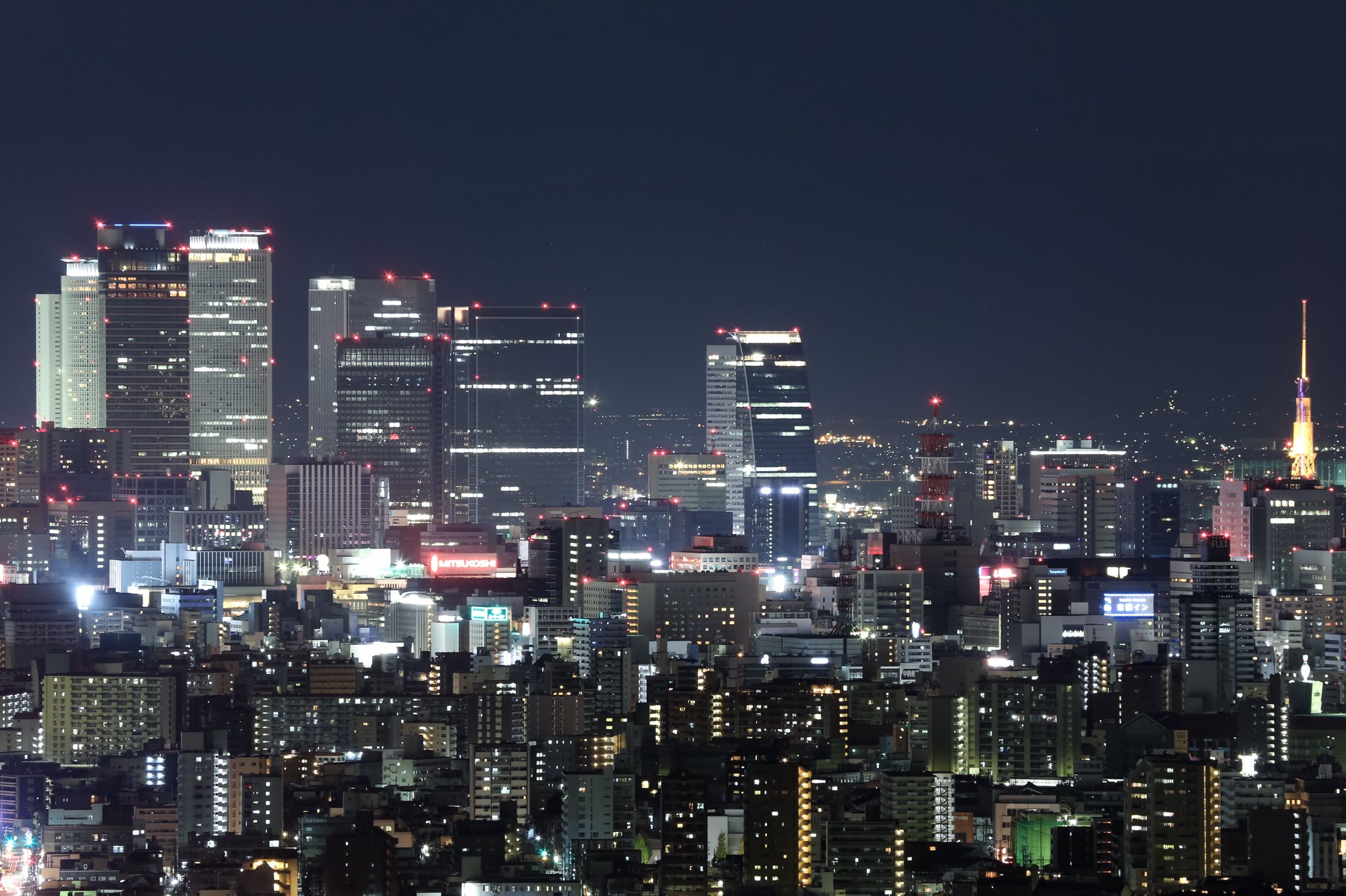
01.Nagoya

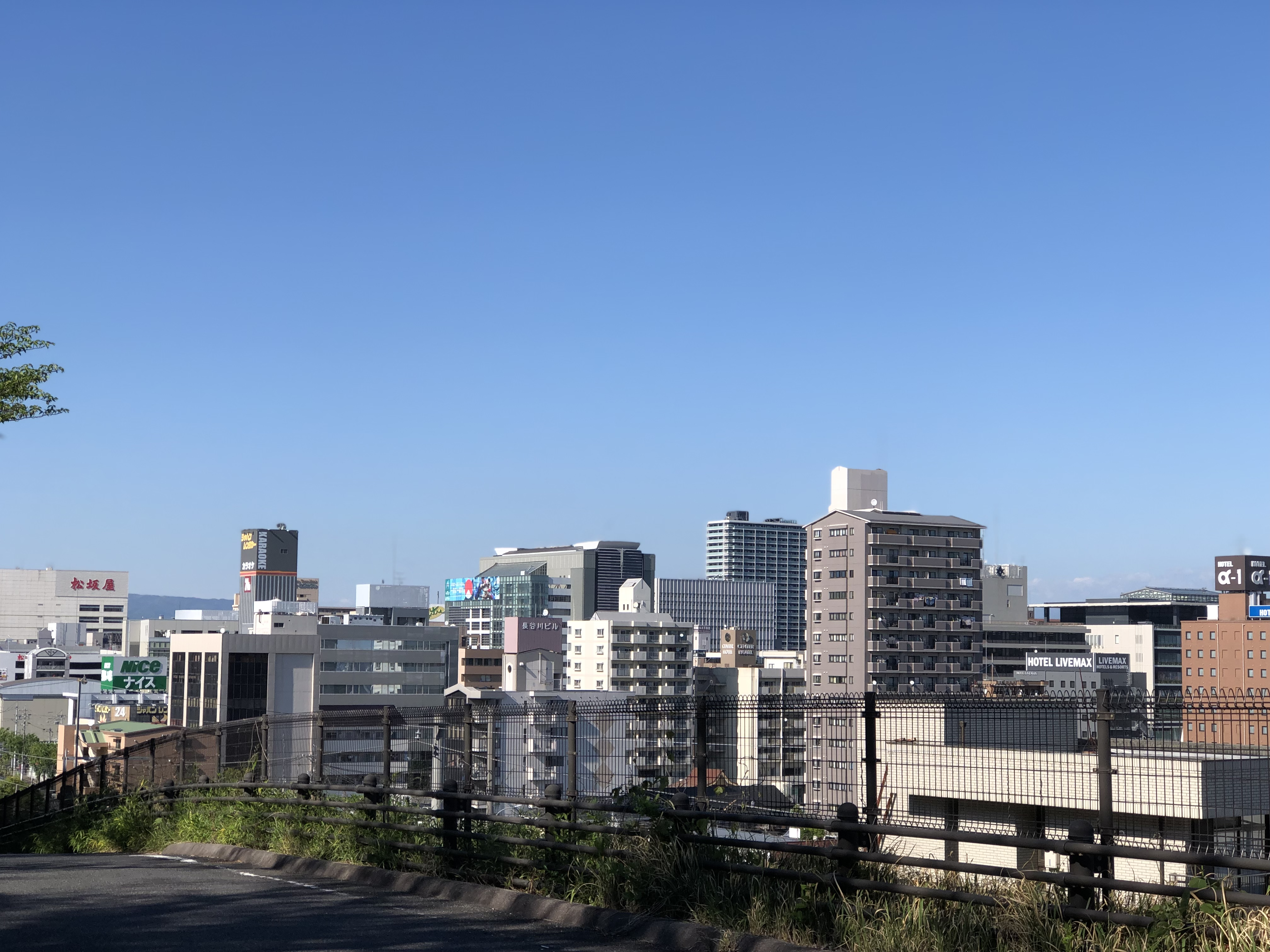
02.Toyota

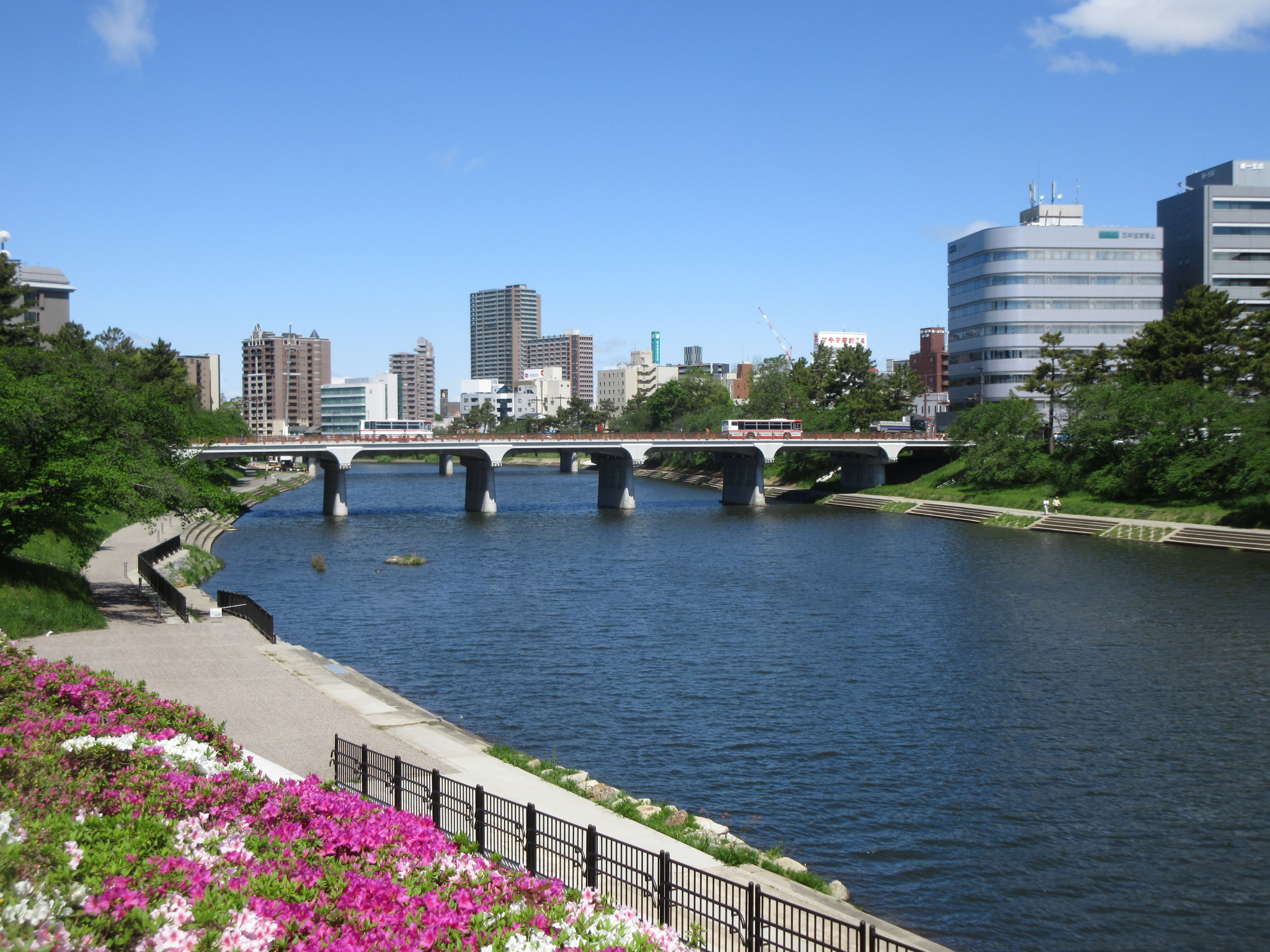
03.Okazaki

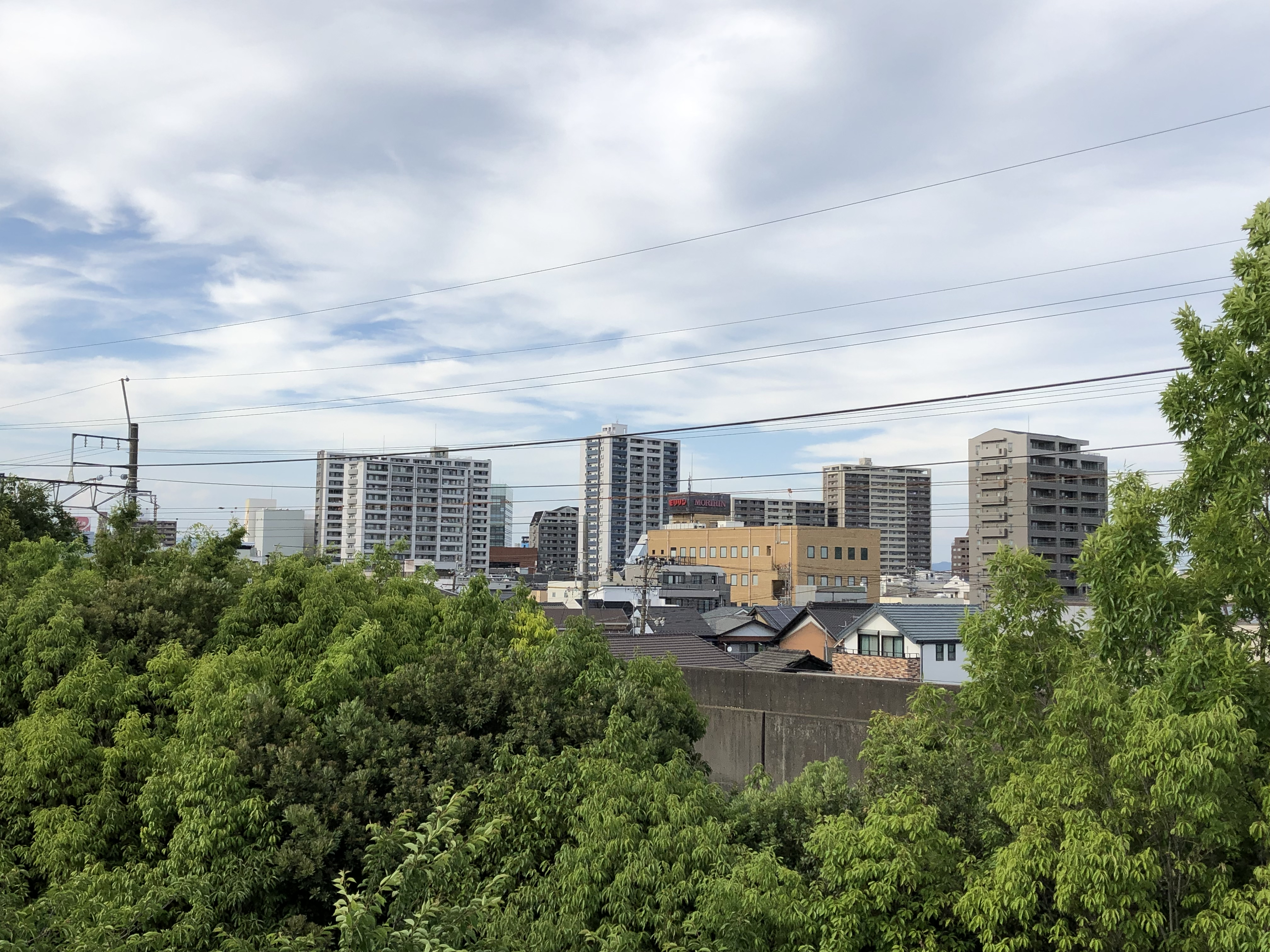
04.Ichinomiya

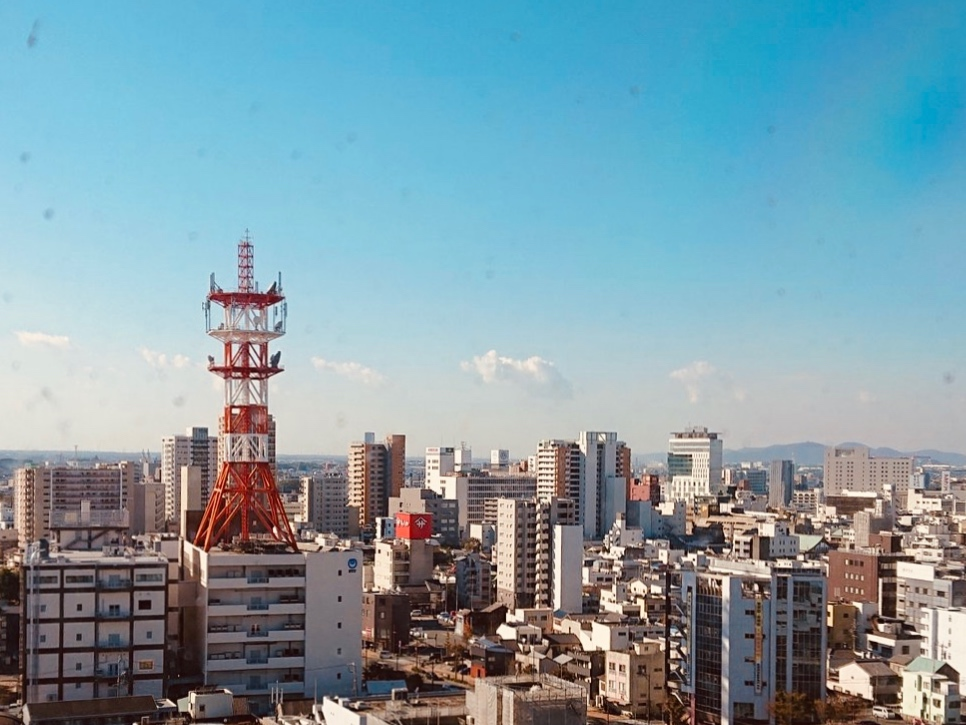
05.Toyohashi

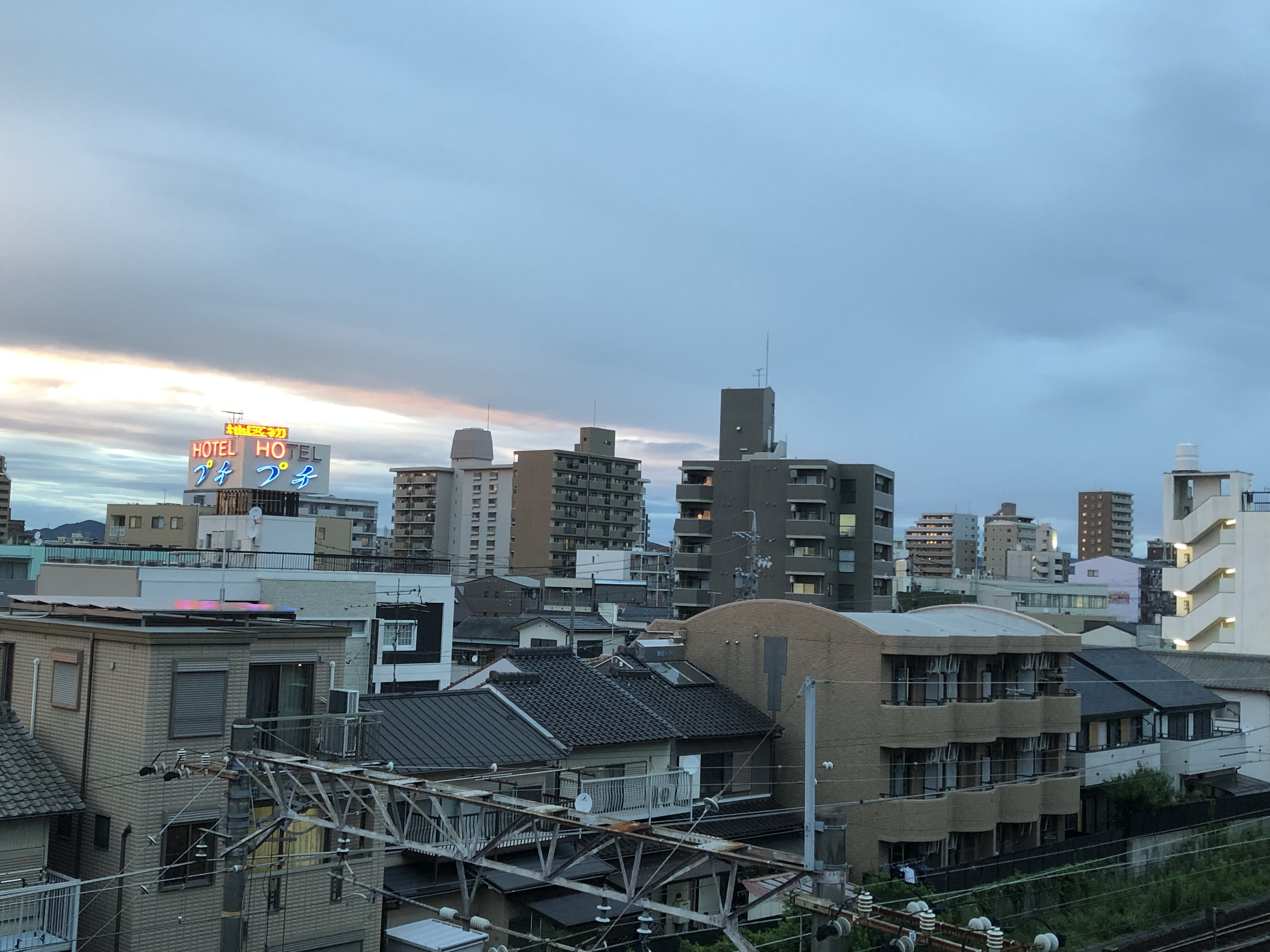
06.Kasugai

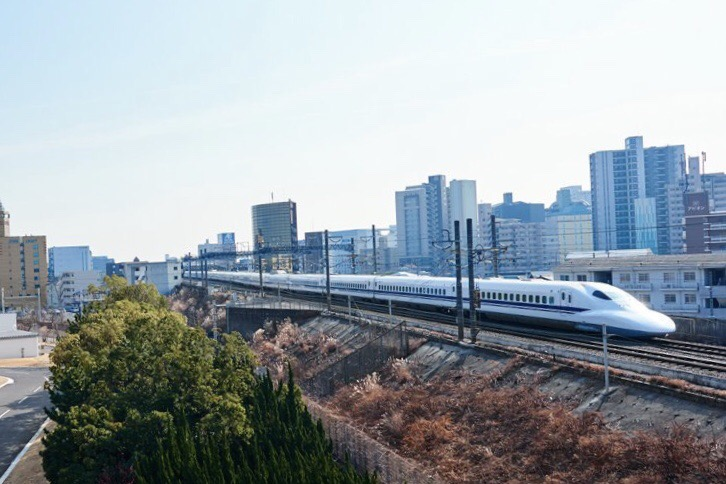
07.Anjō

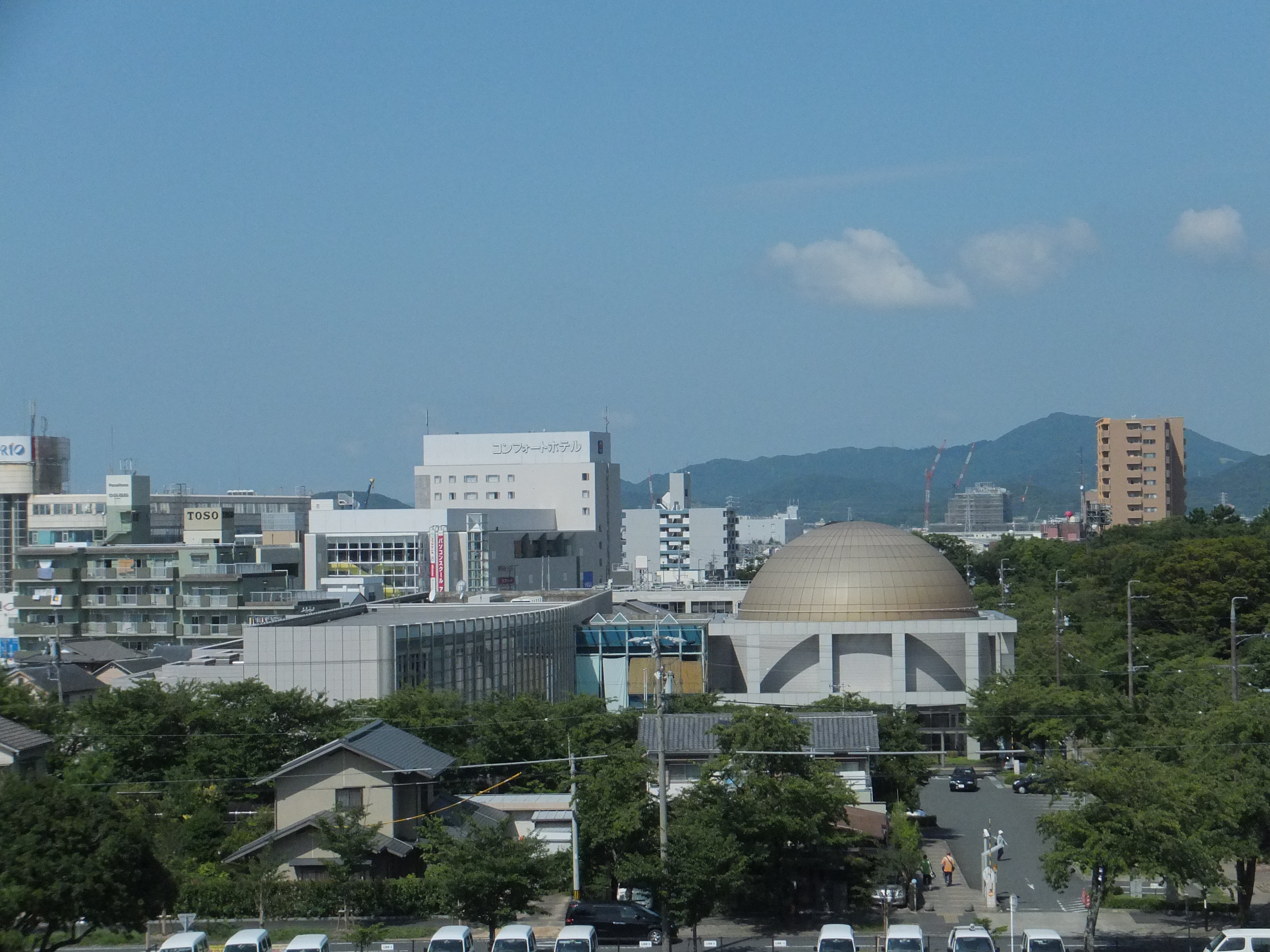
08.Toyokawa

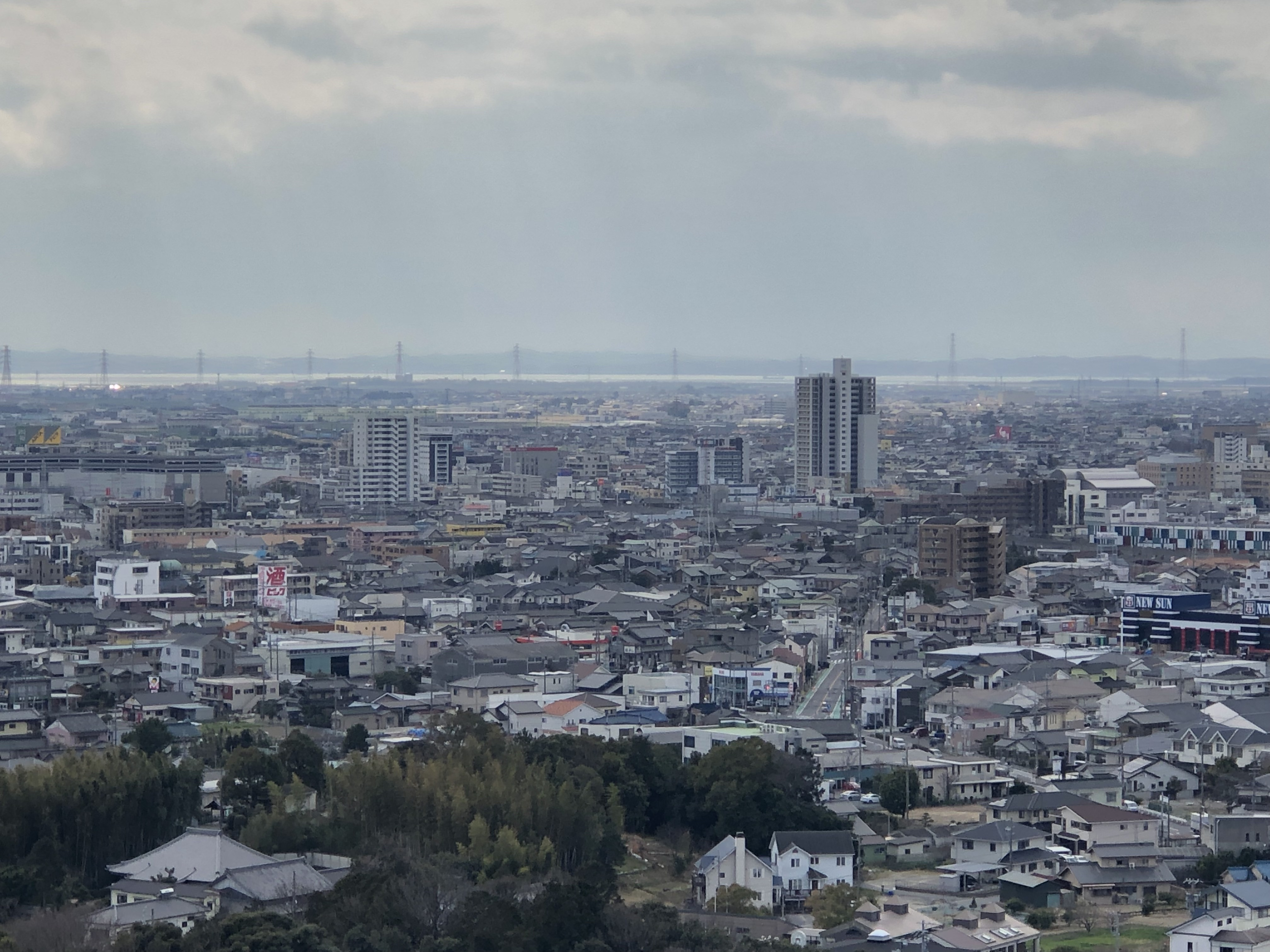
09.Nishio

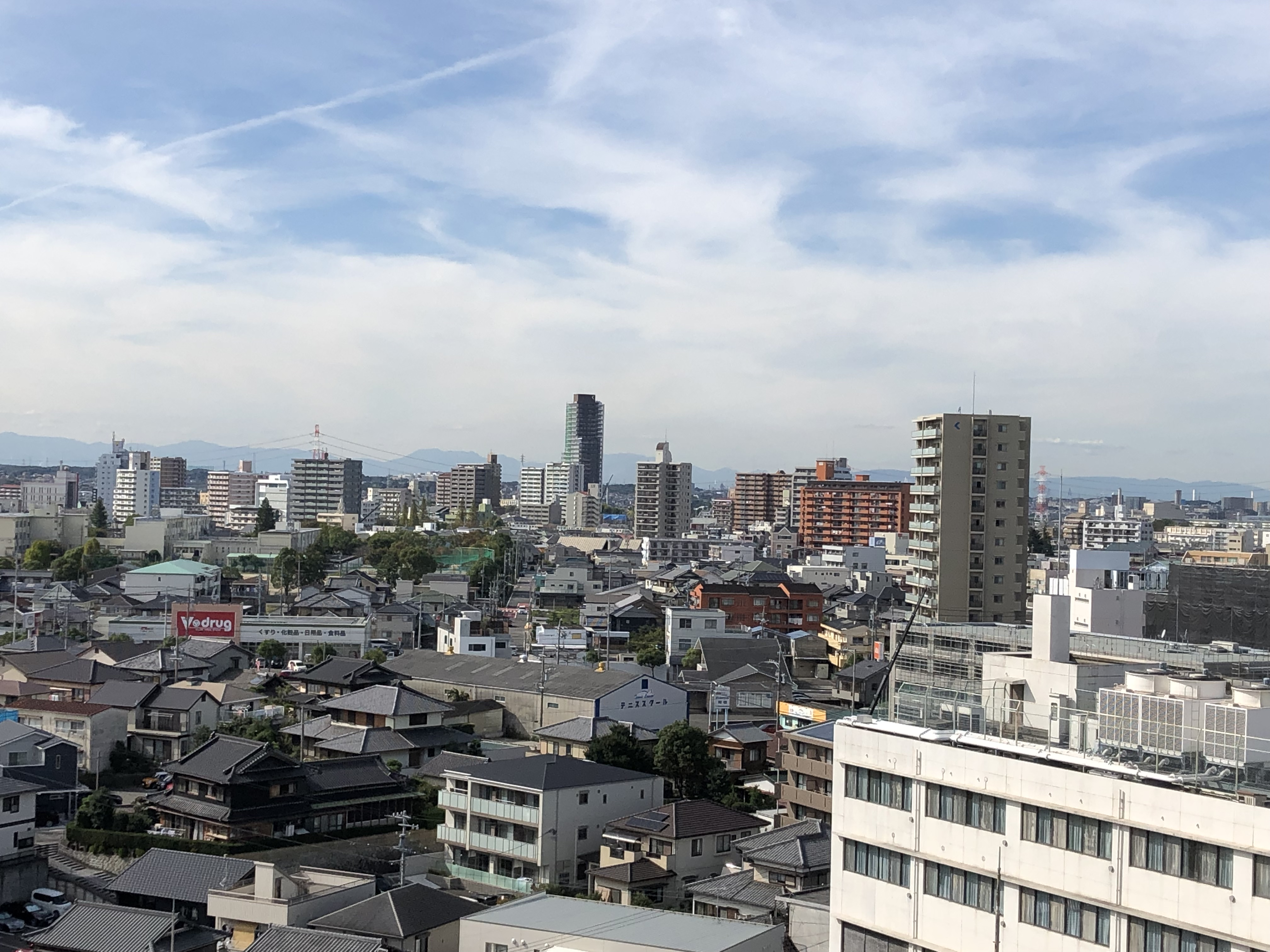
10.Kariya

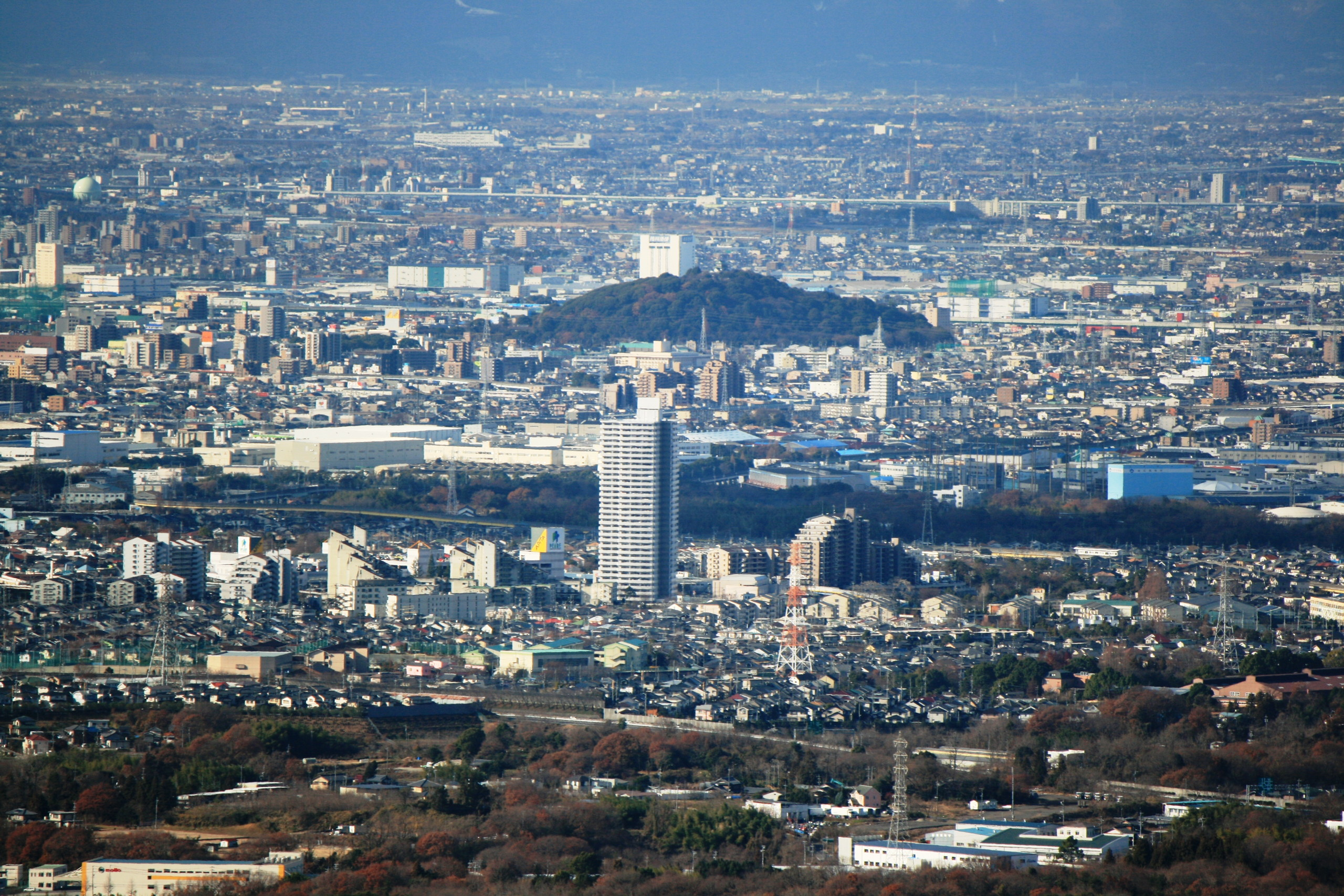
11.Komaki

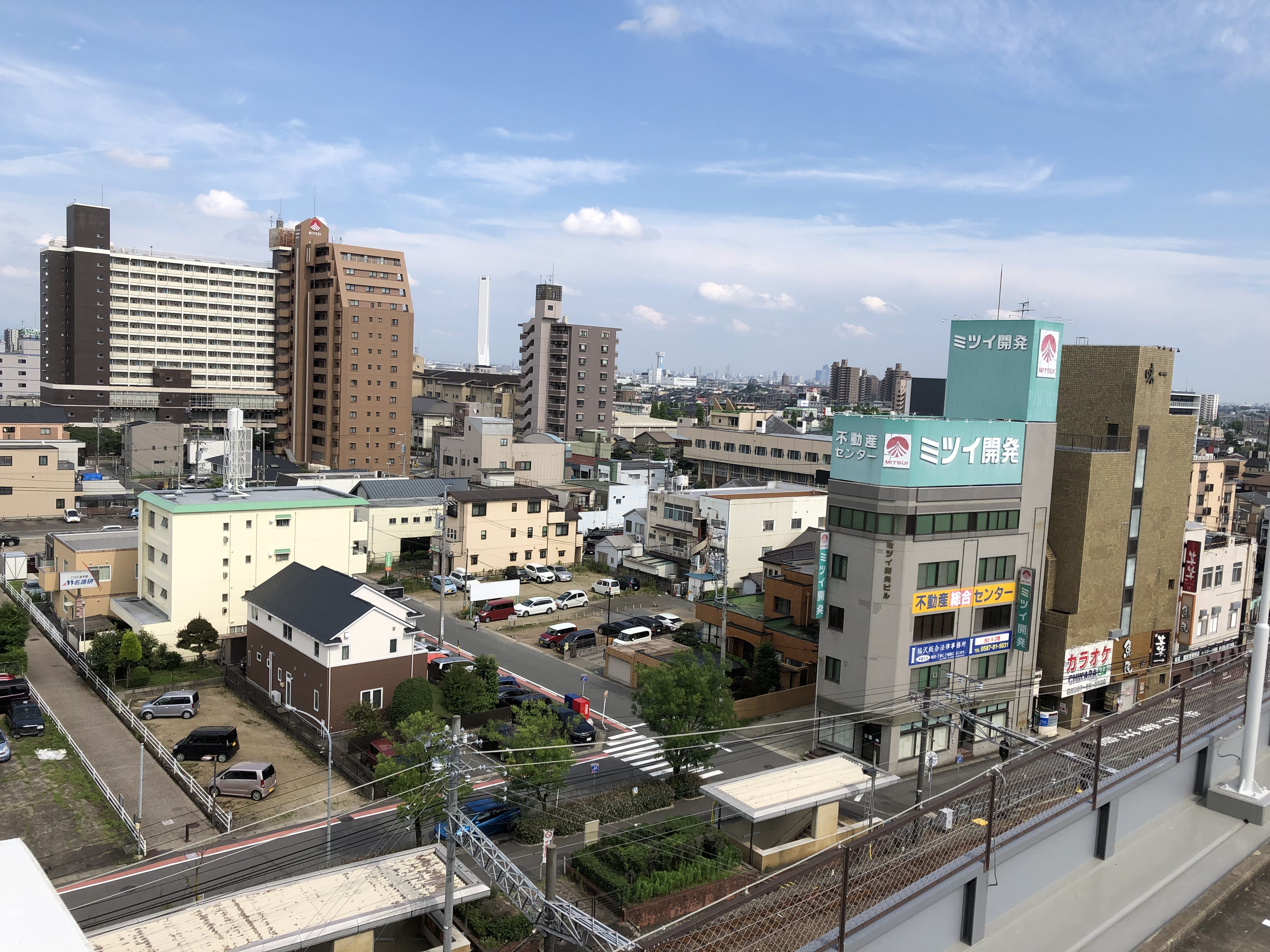
12.Inazawa

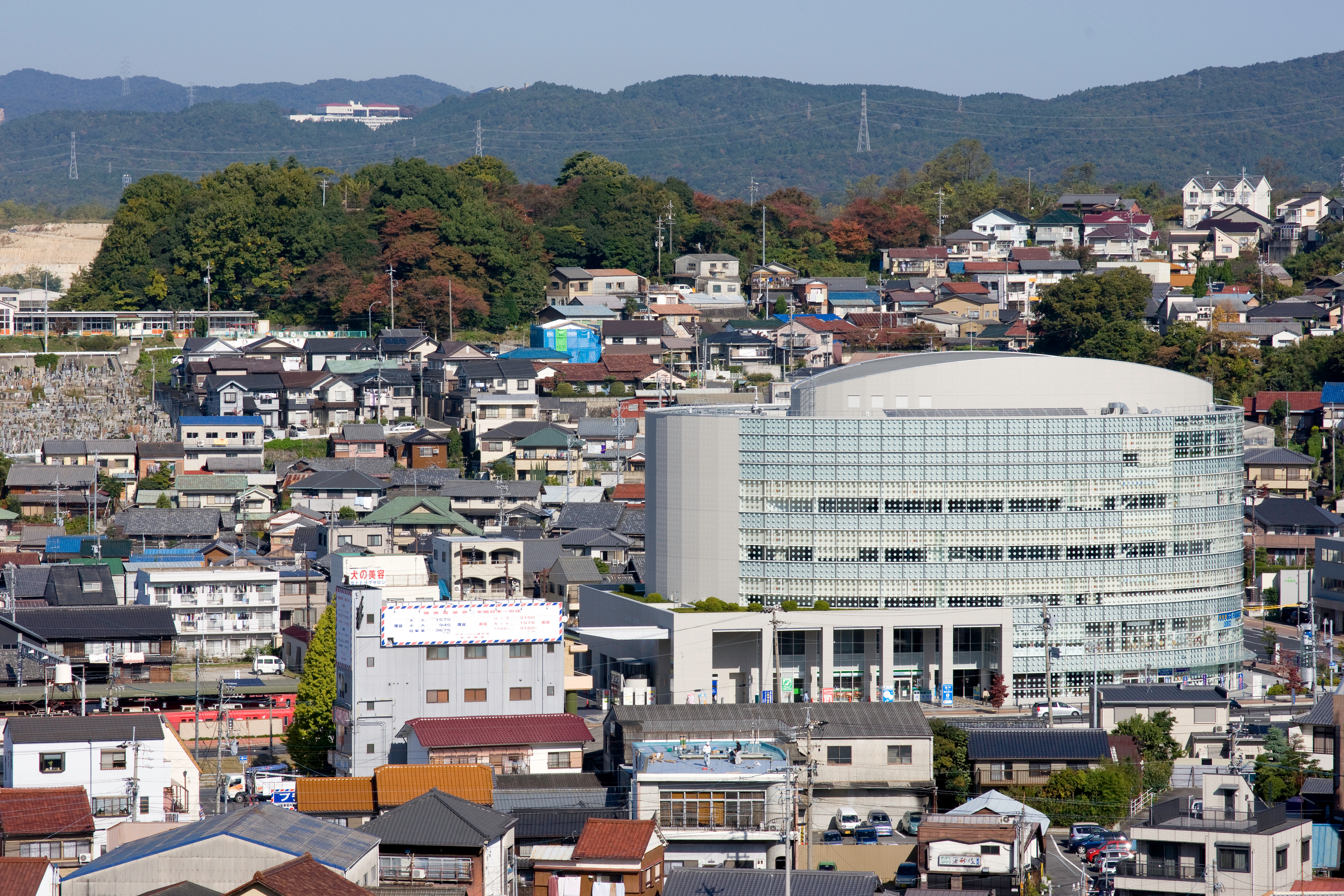
13.Seto

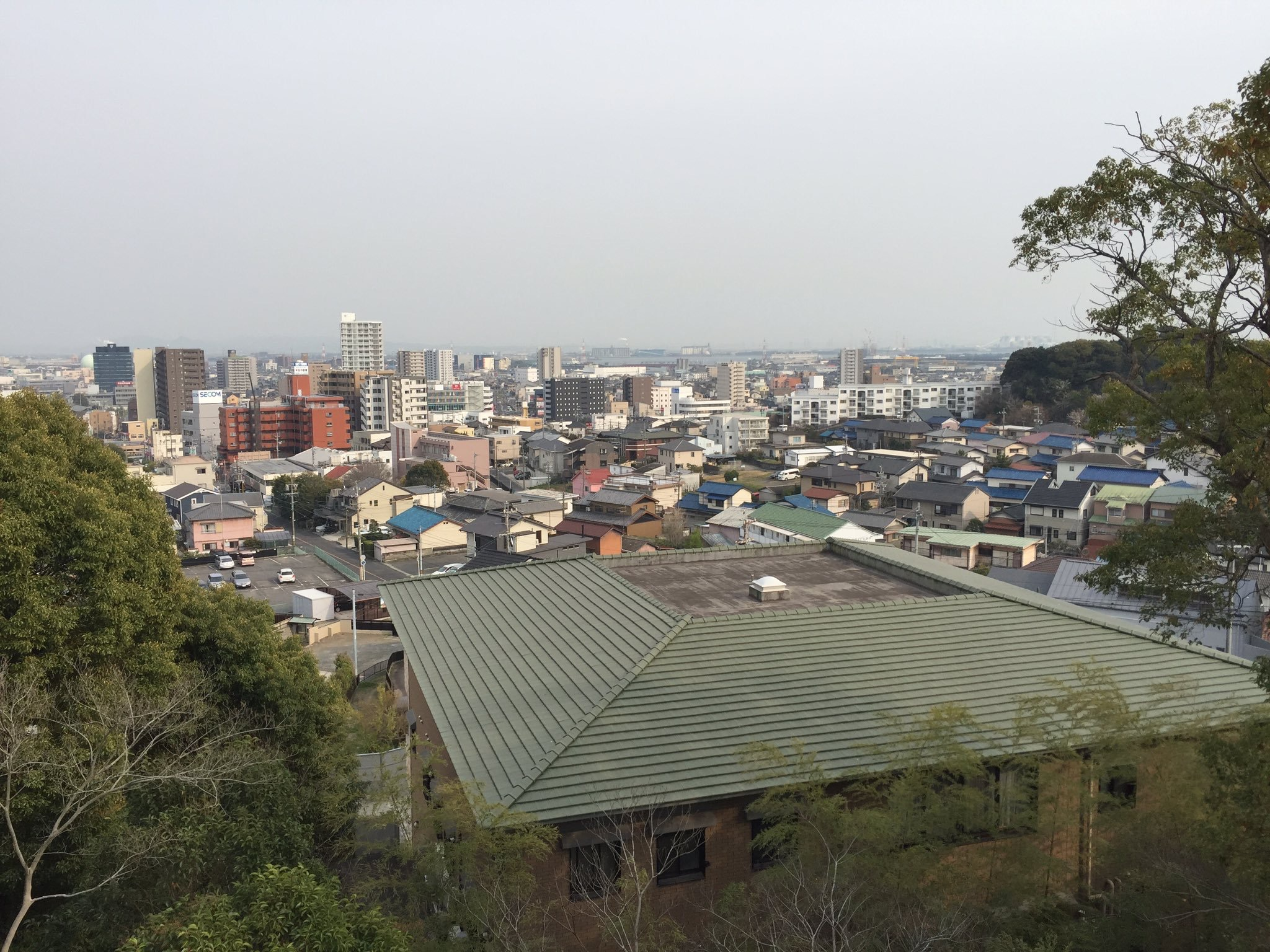
14.Handa

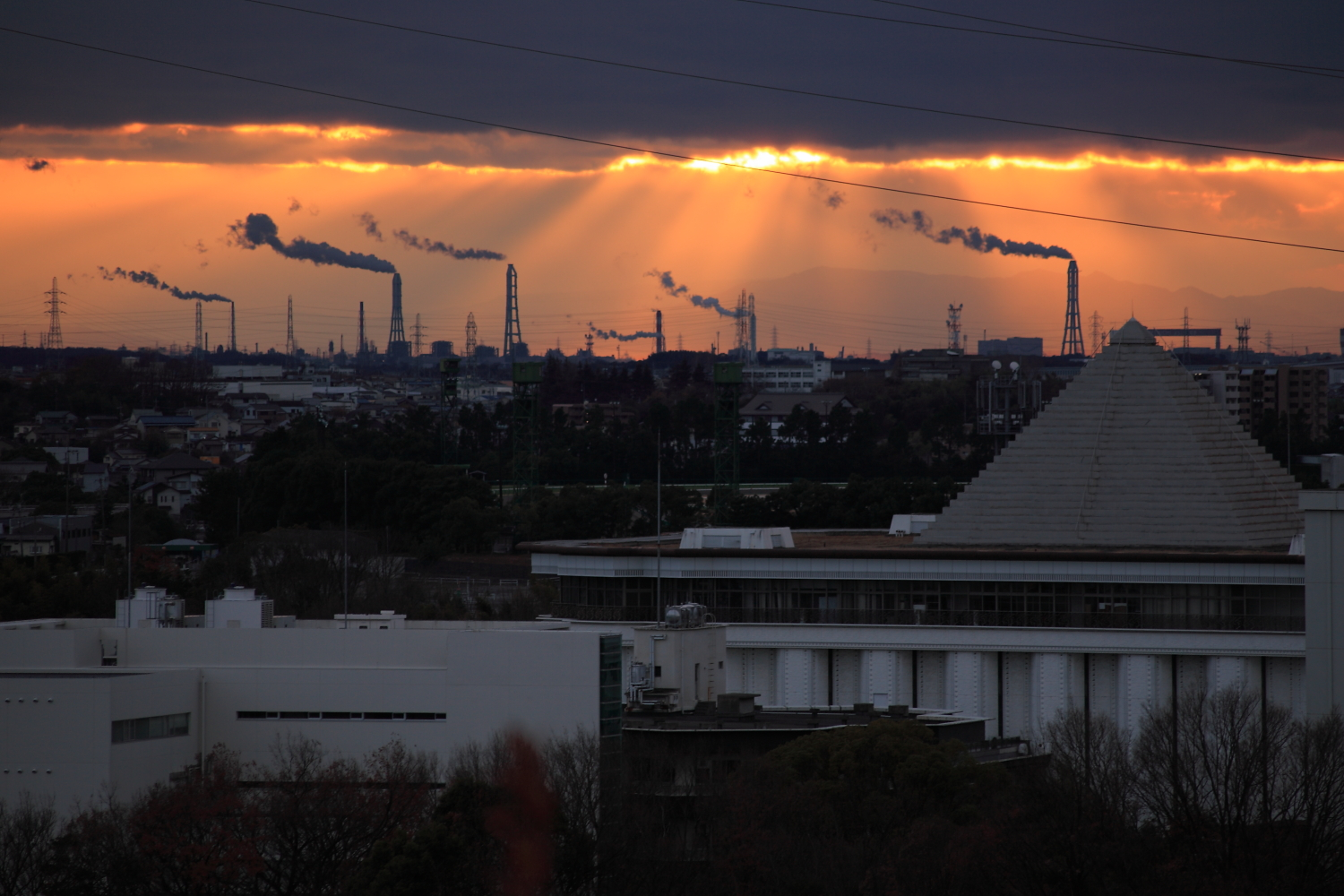
15.Tōkai

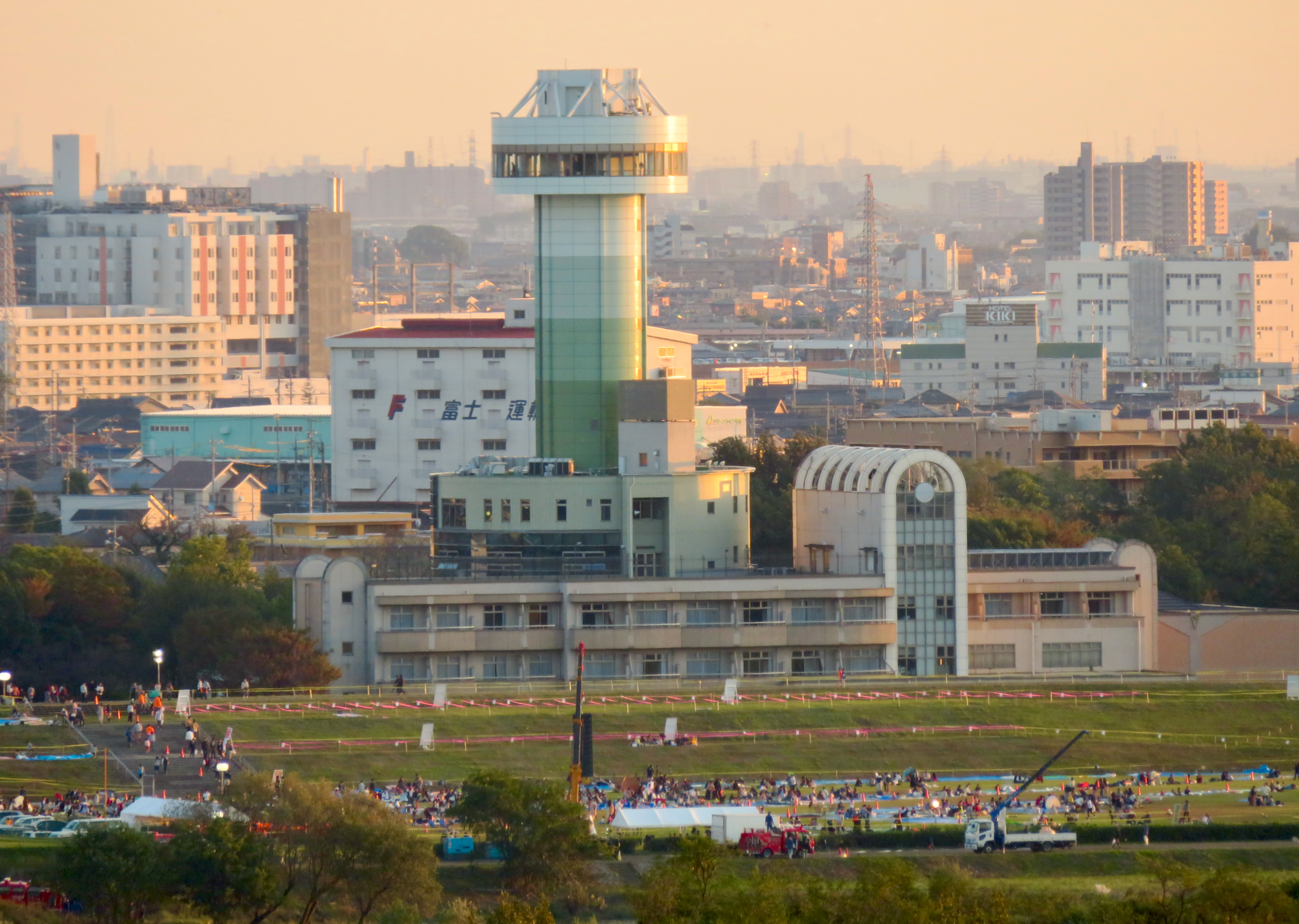
16.Kōnan

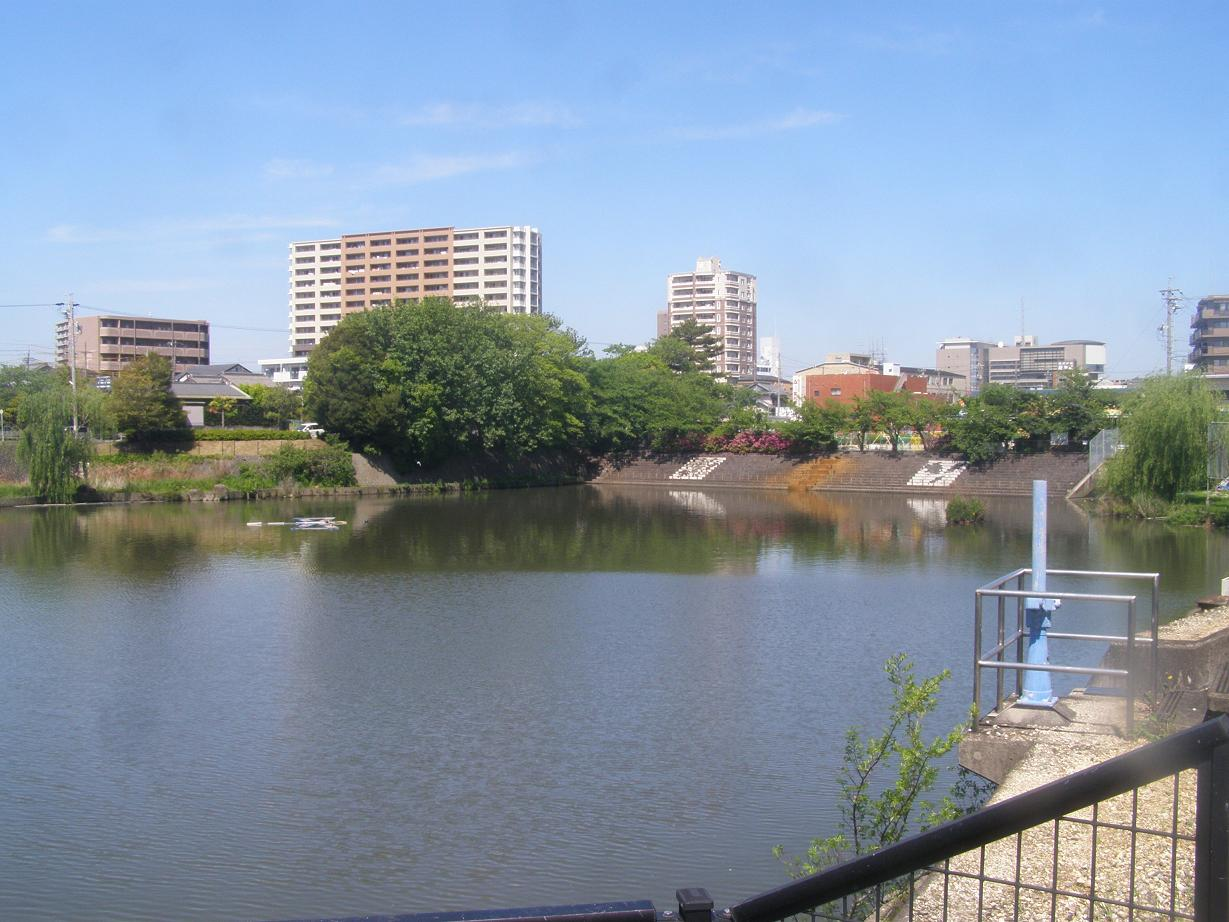
17.Ōbu

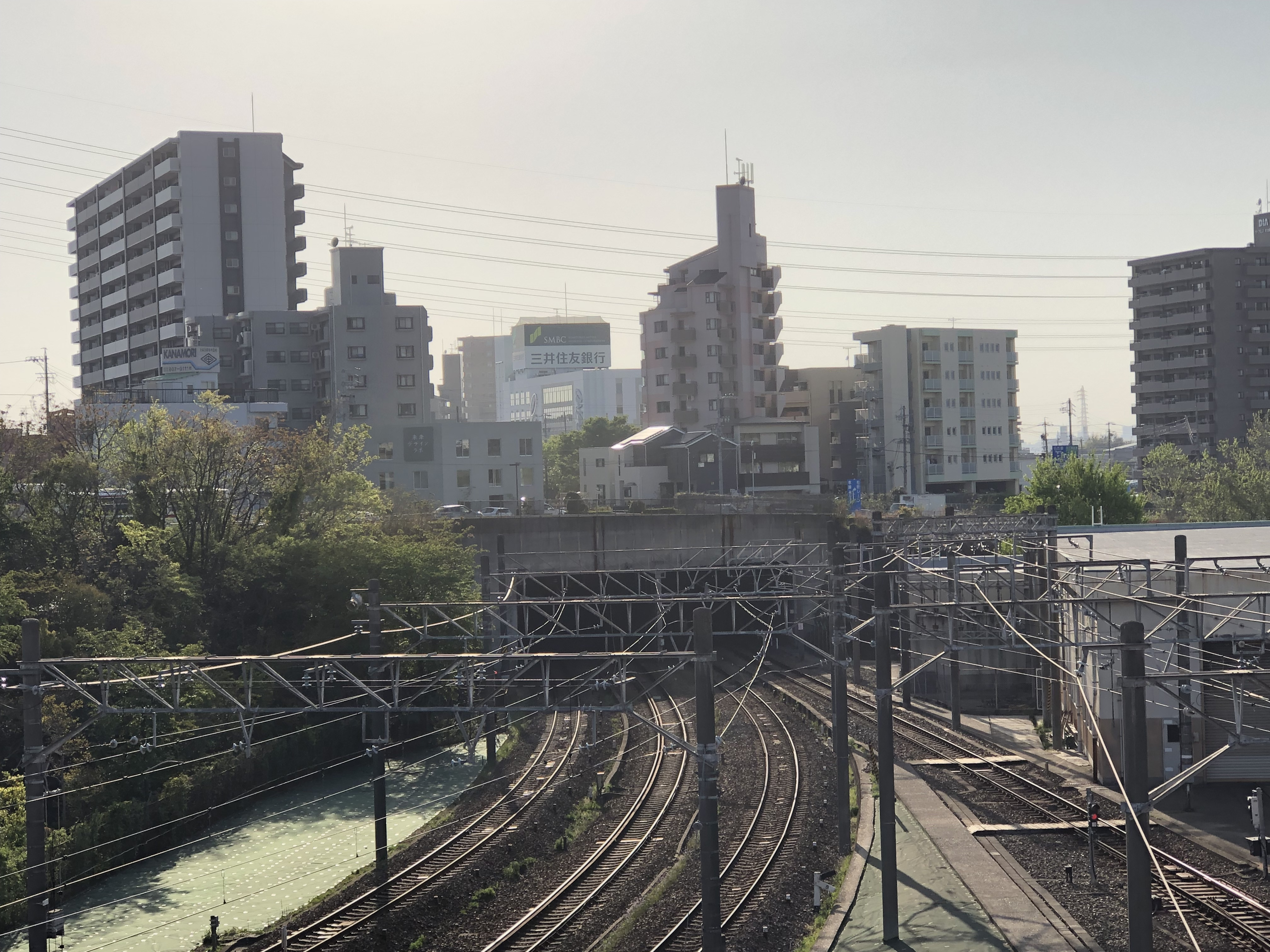
18.Nisshin

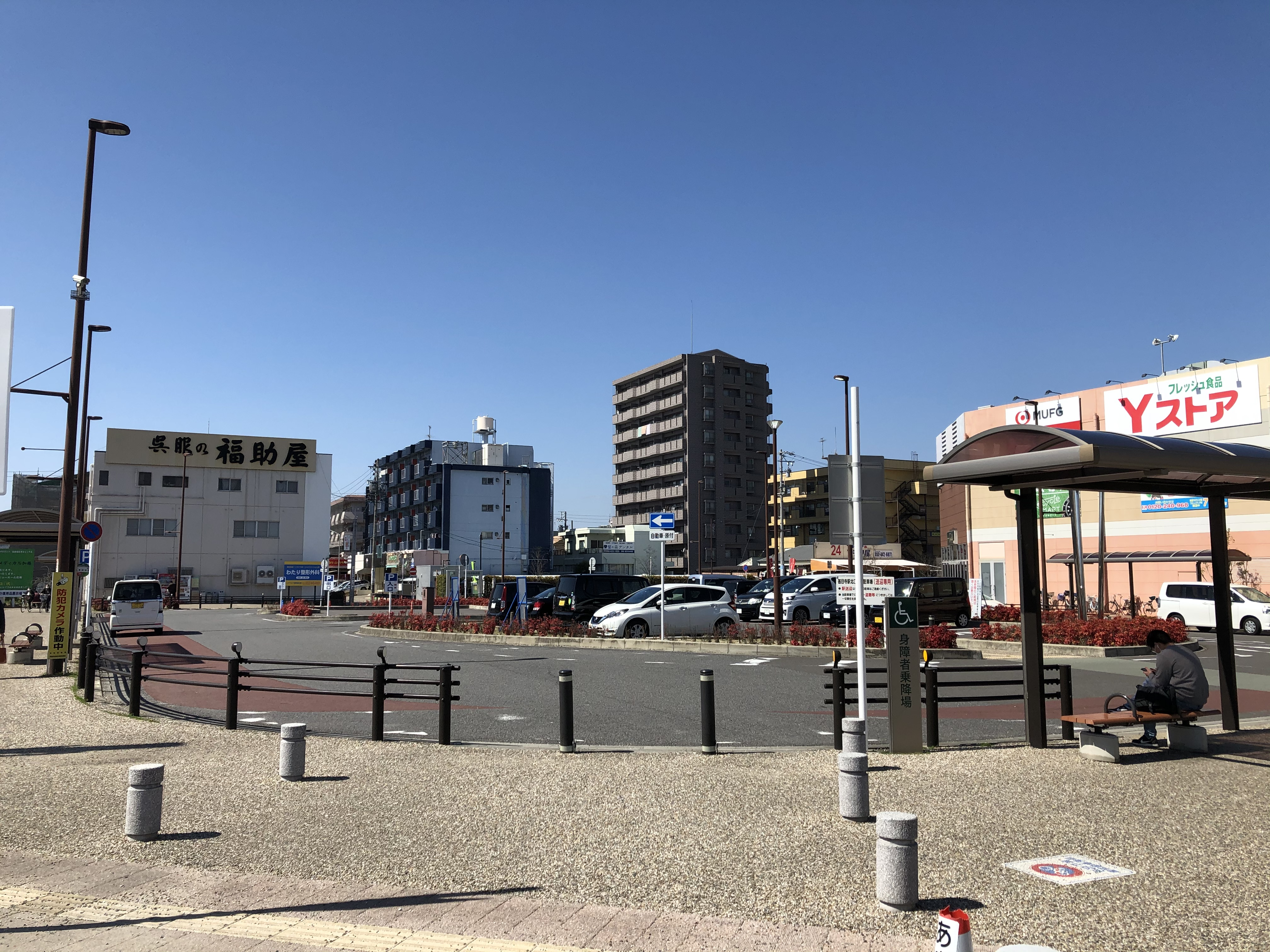
19.Ama

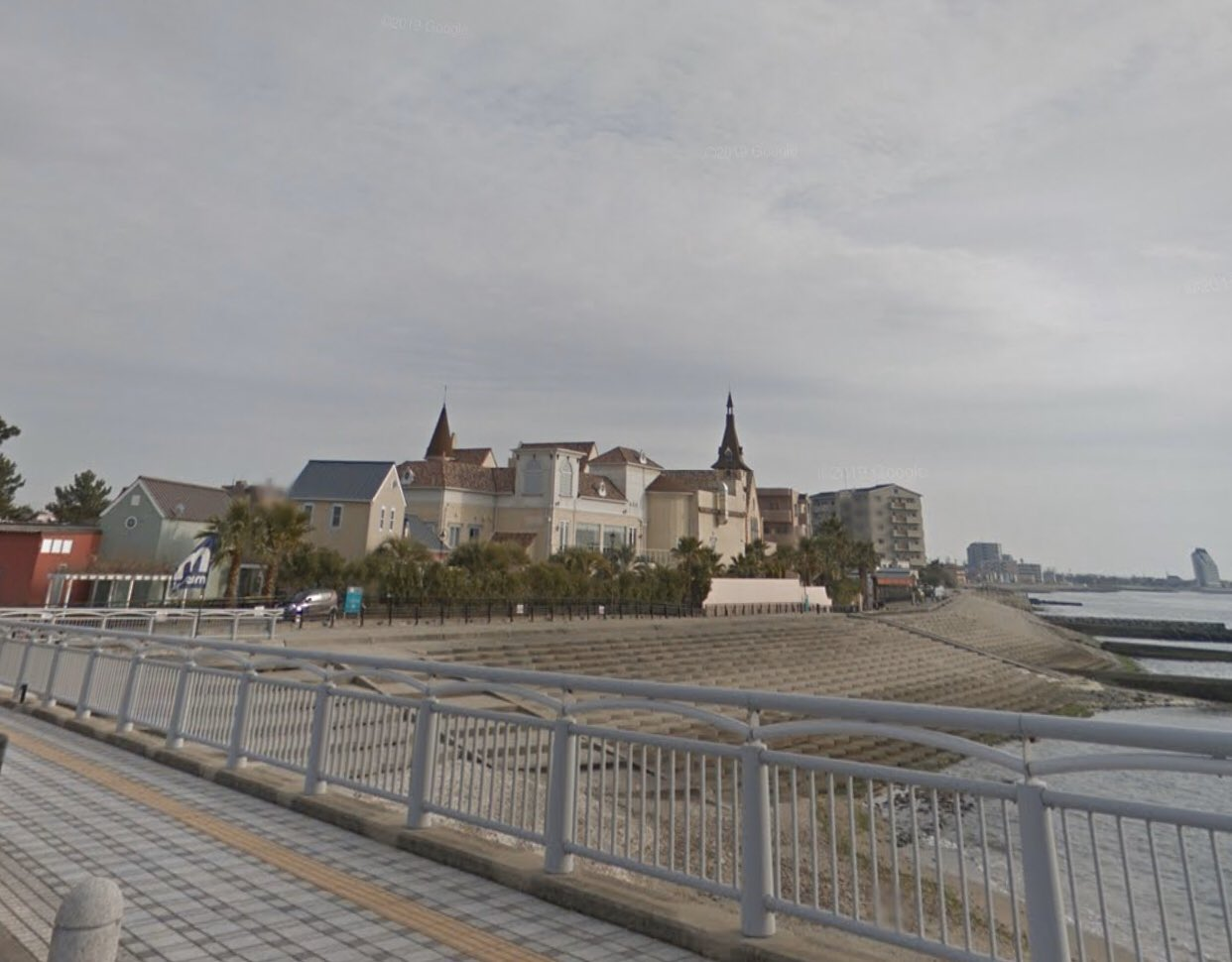
20.Chita

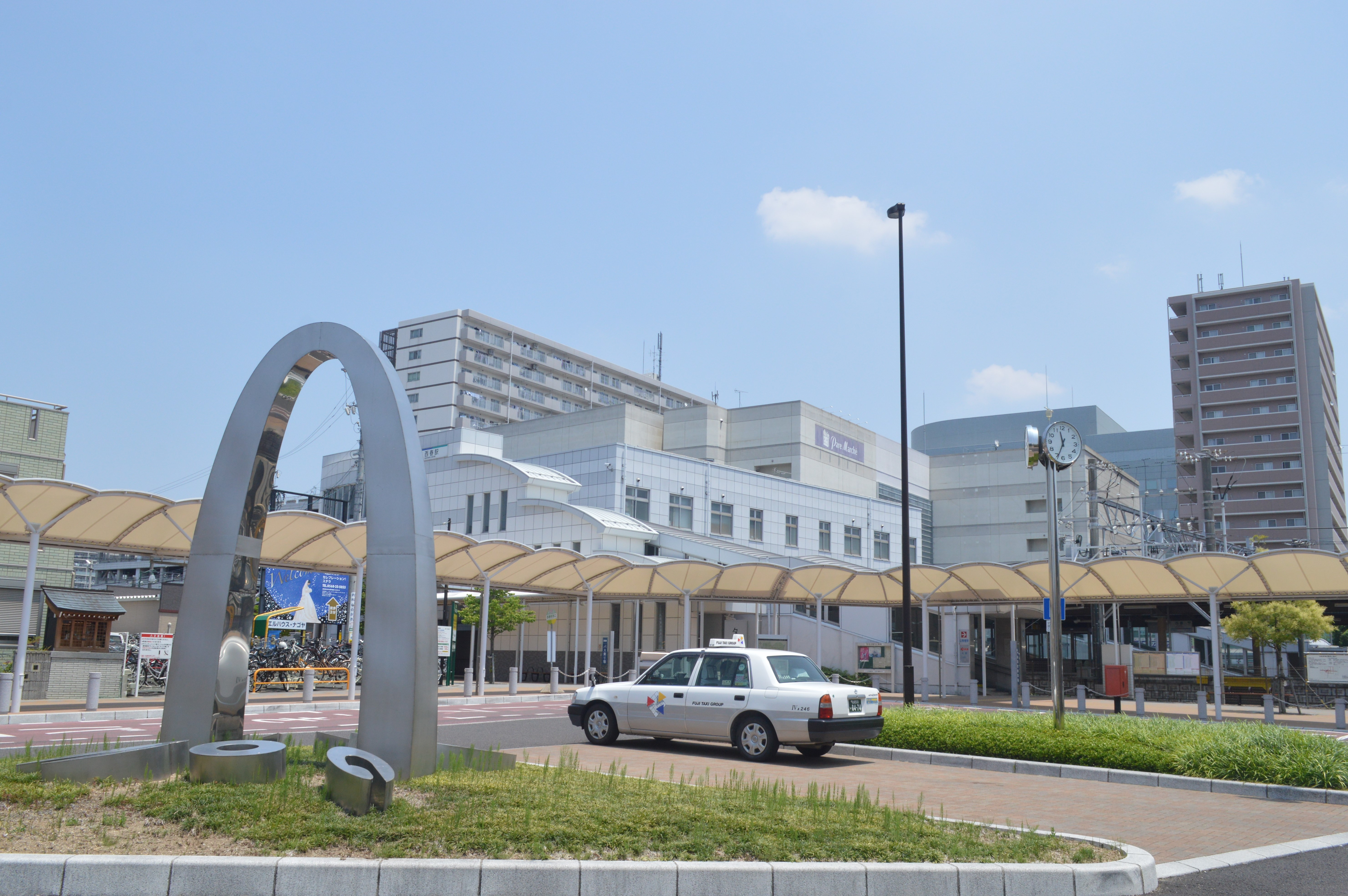
21.Kitanagoya

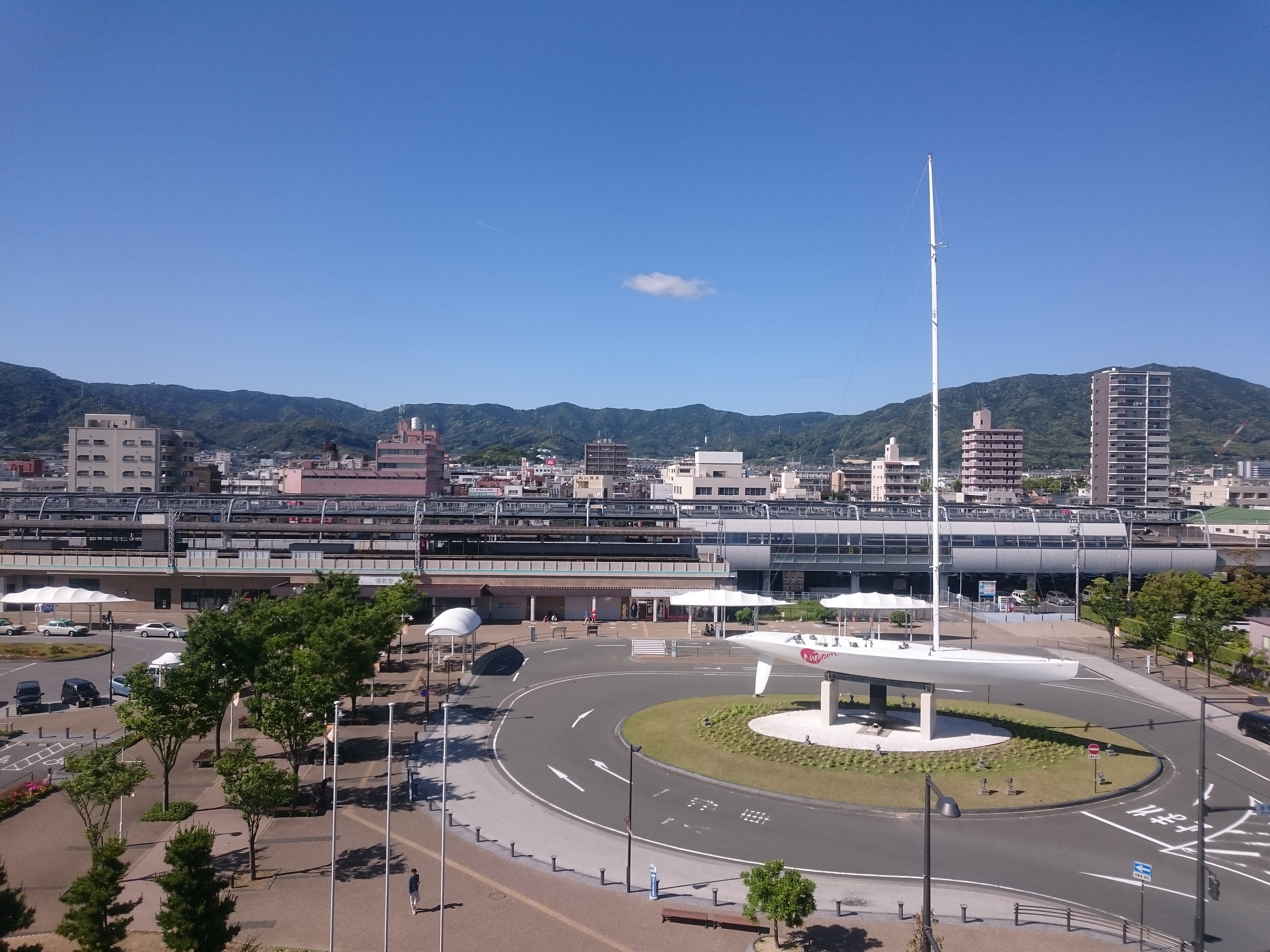
22.Gamagōri

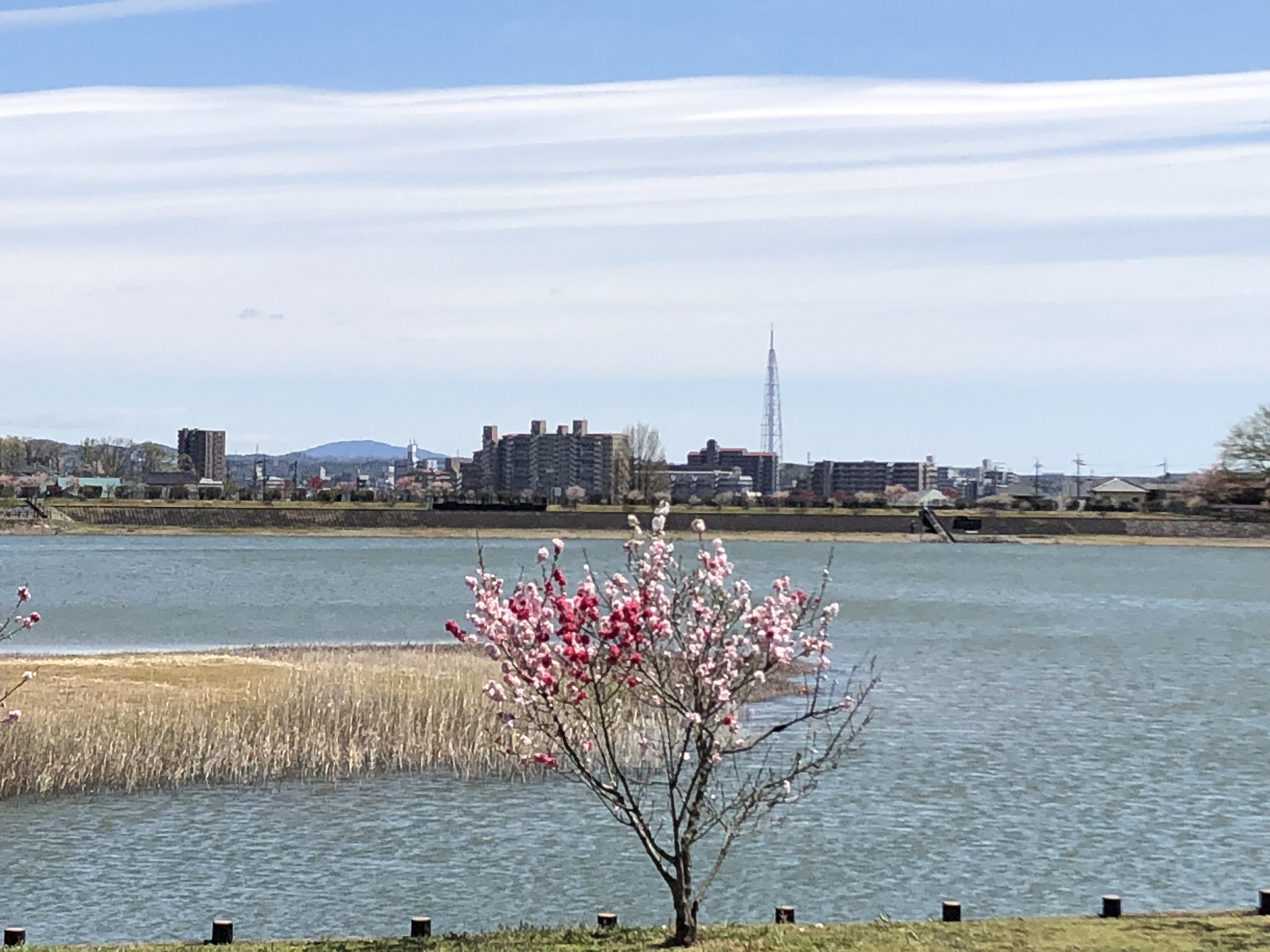
23.Owariasahi

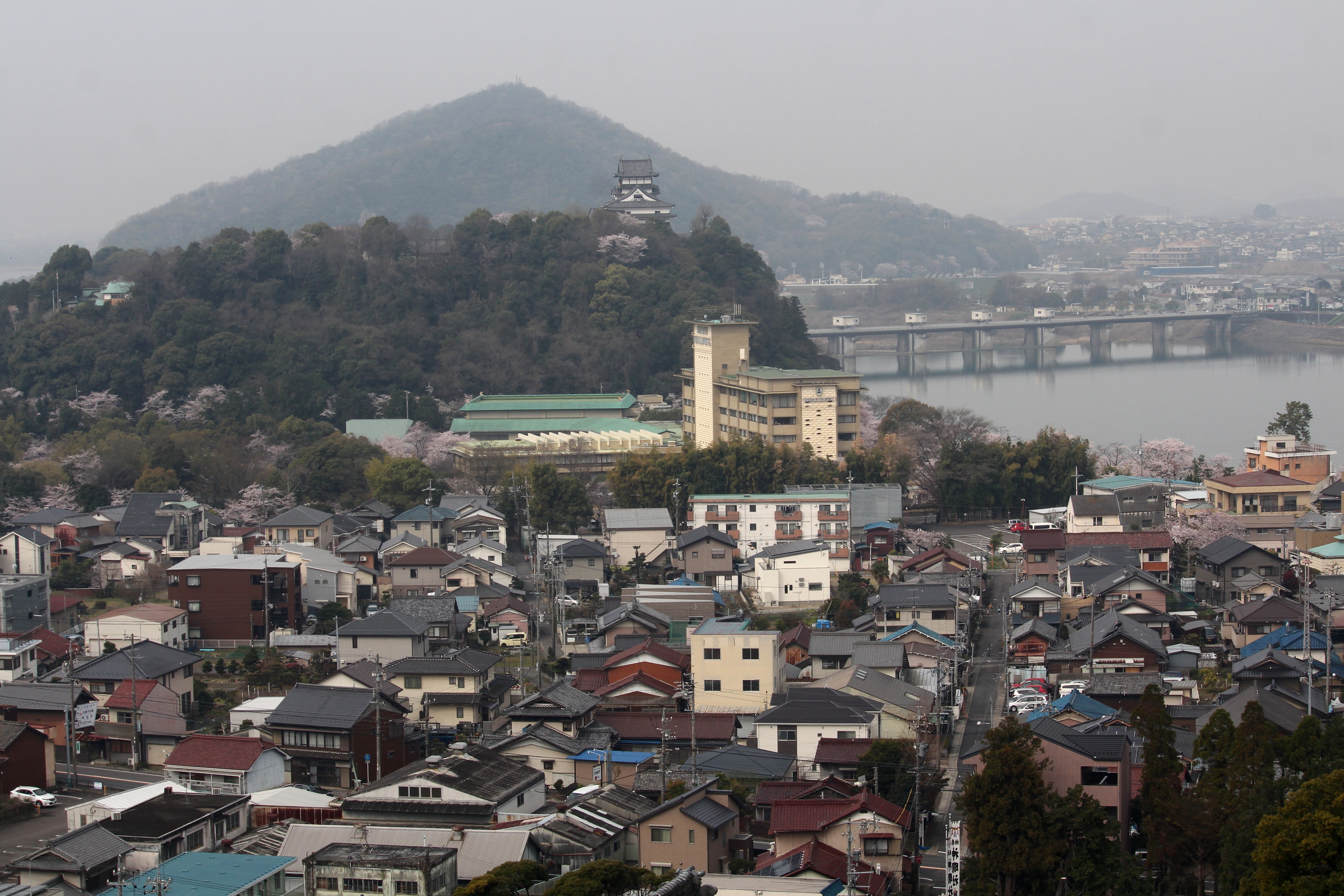
24.Inuyama

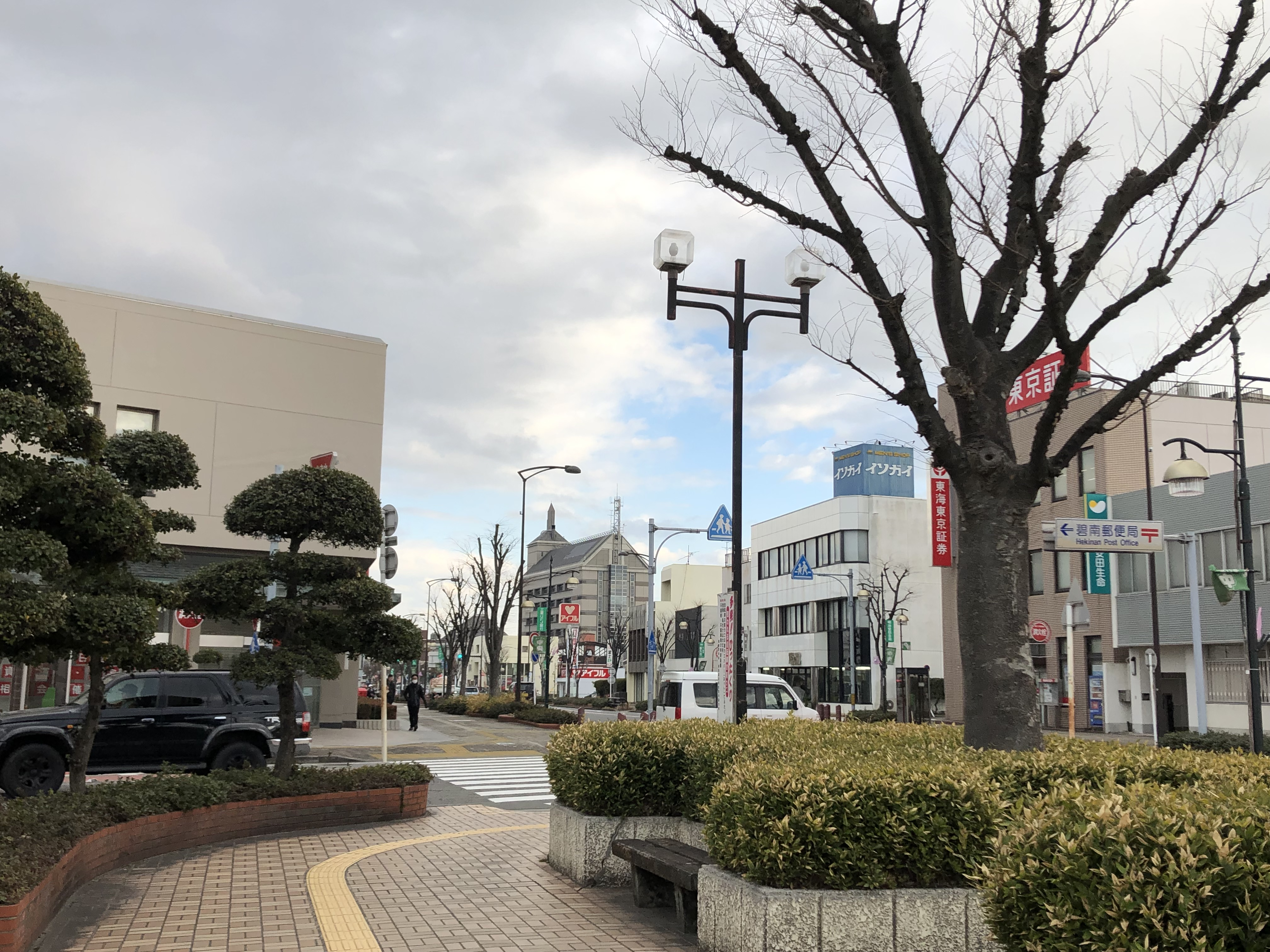
25.Hekinan

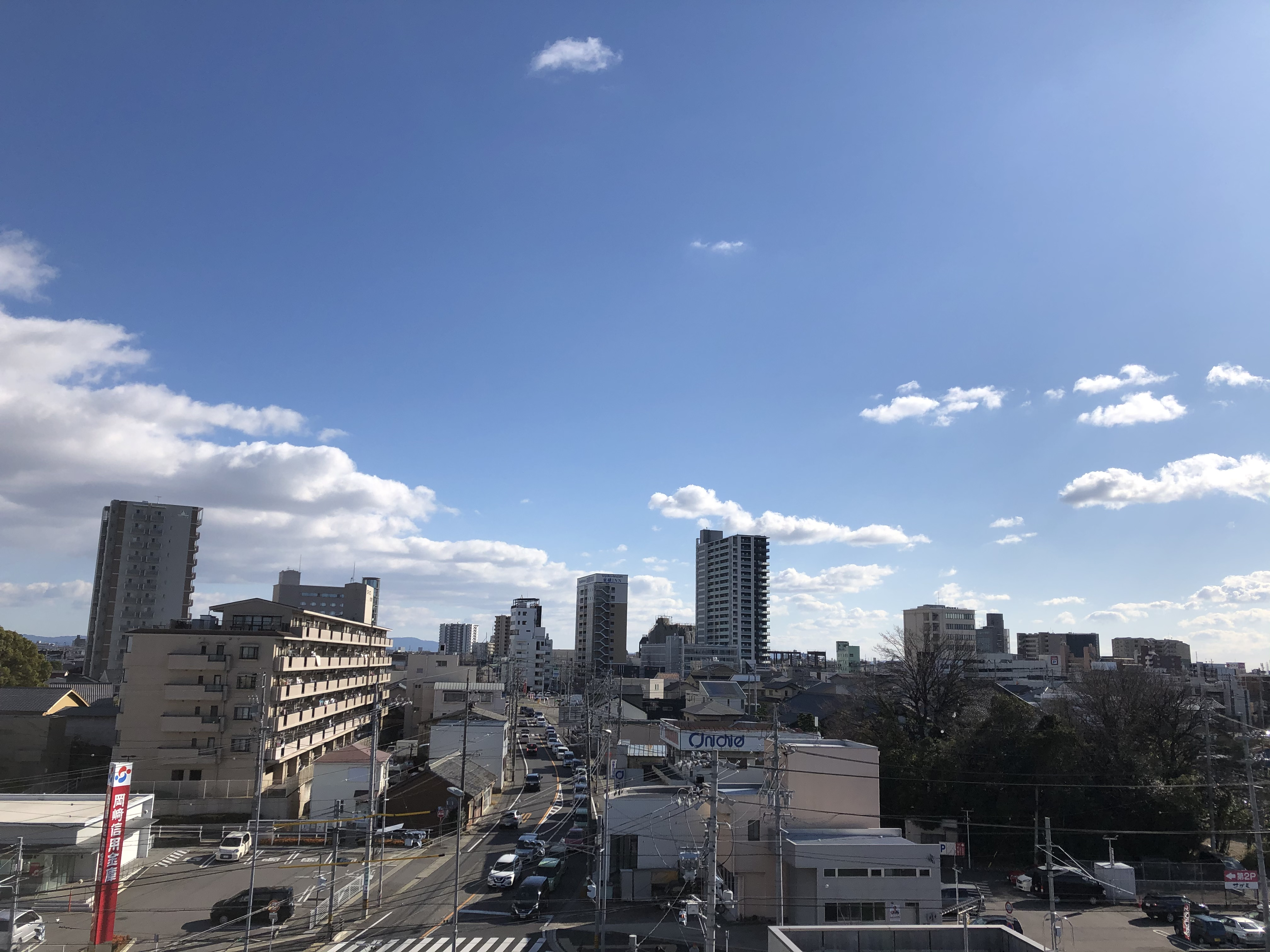
26.Chiryū

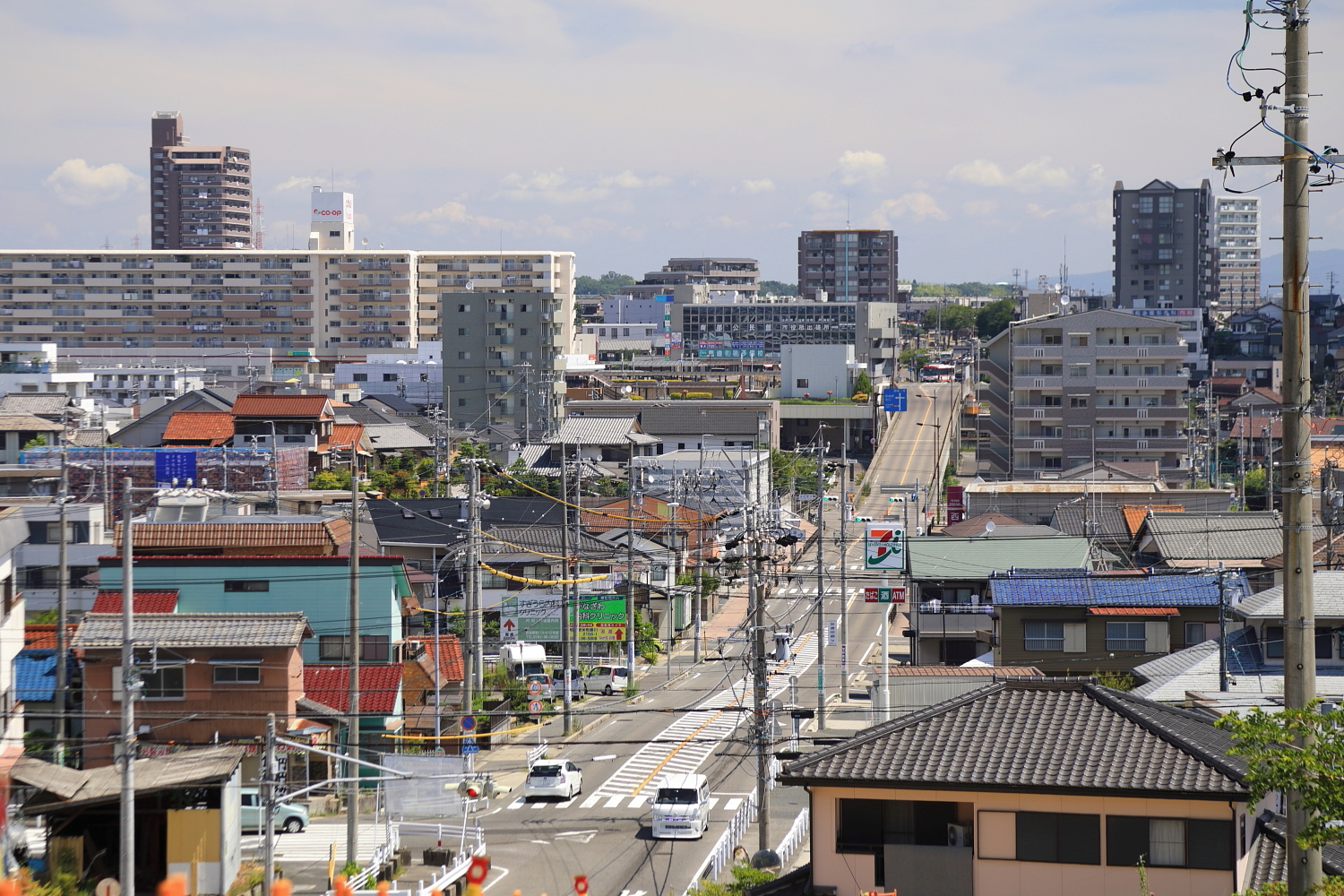
27.Toyoake

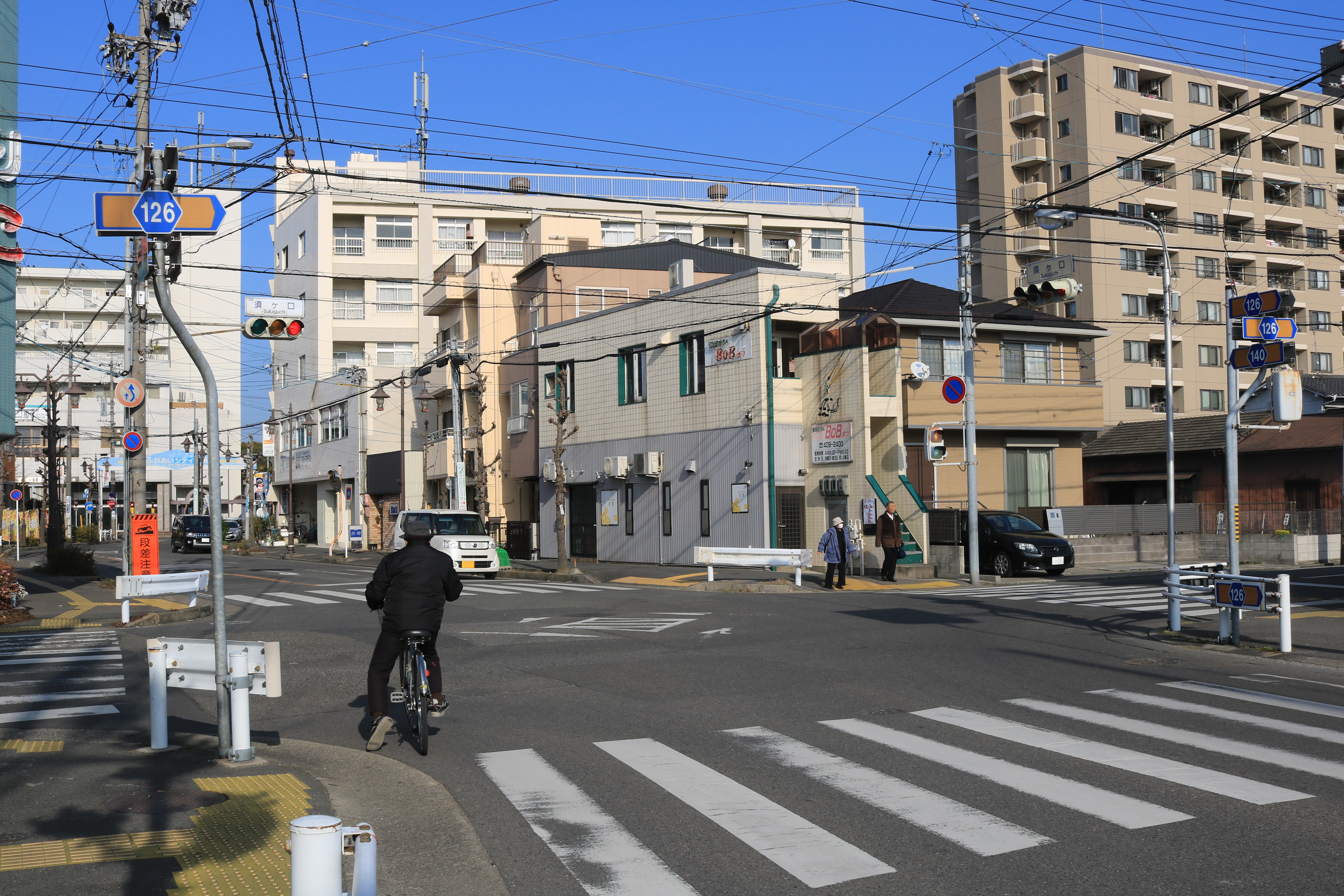
28.Kiyosu

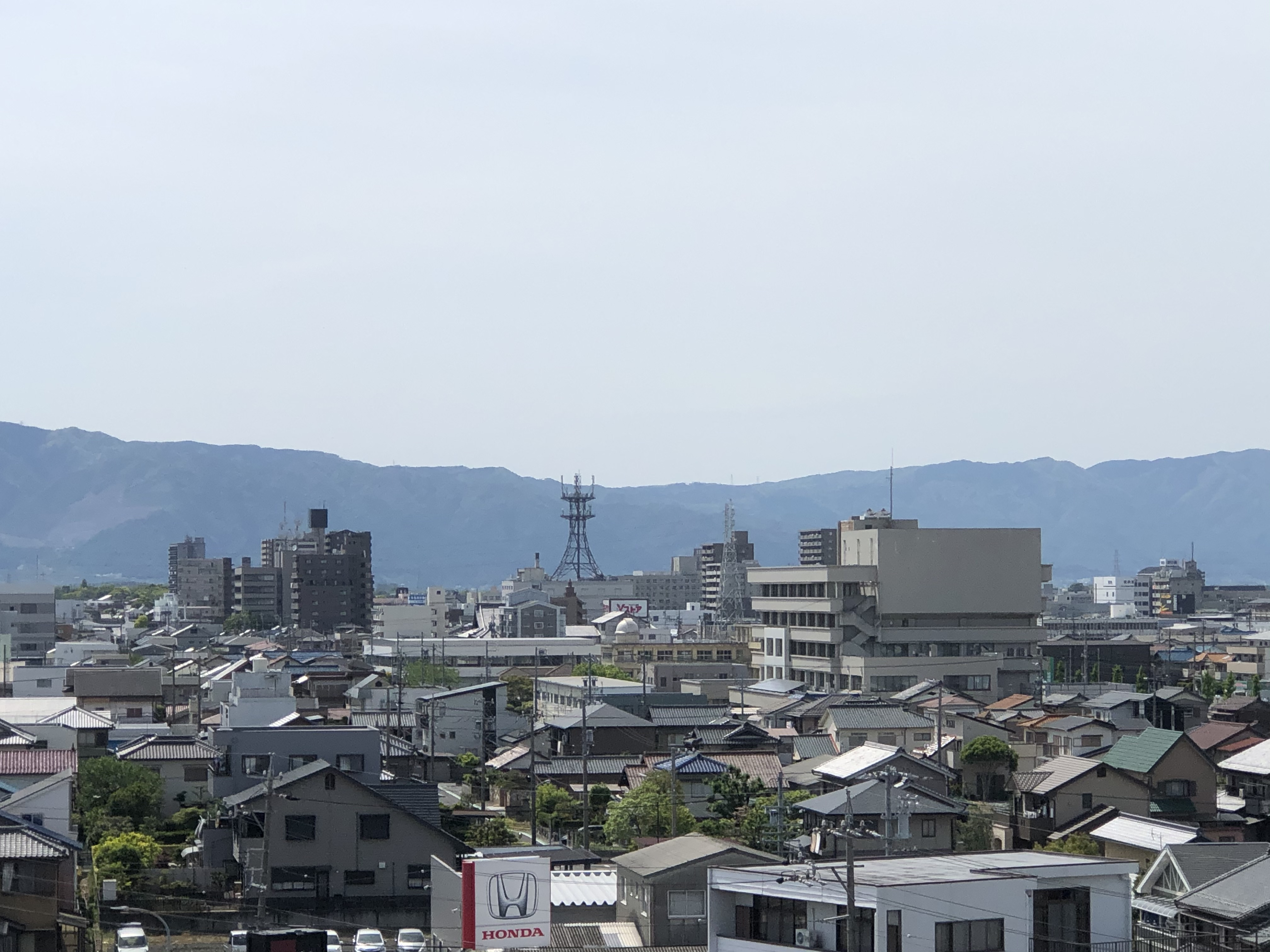
29.Tsushima

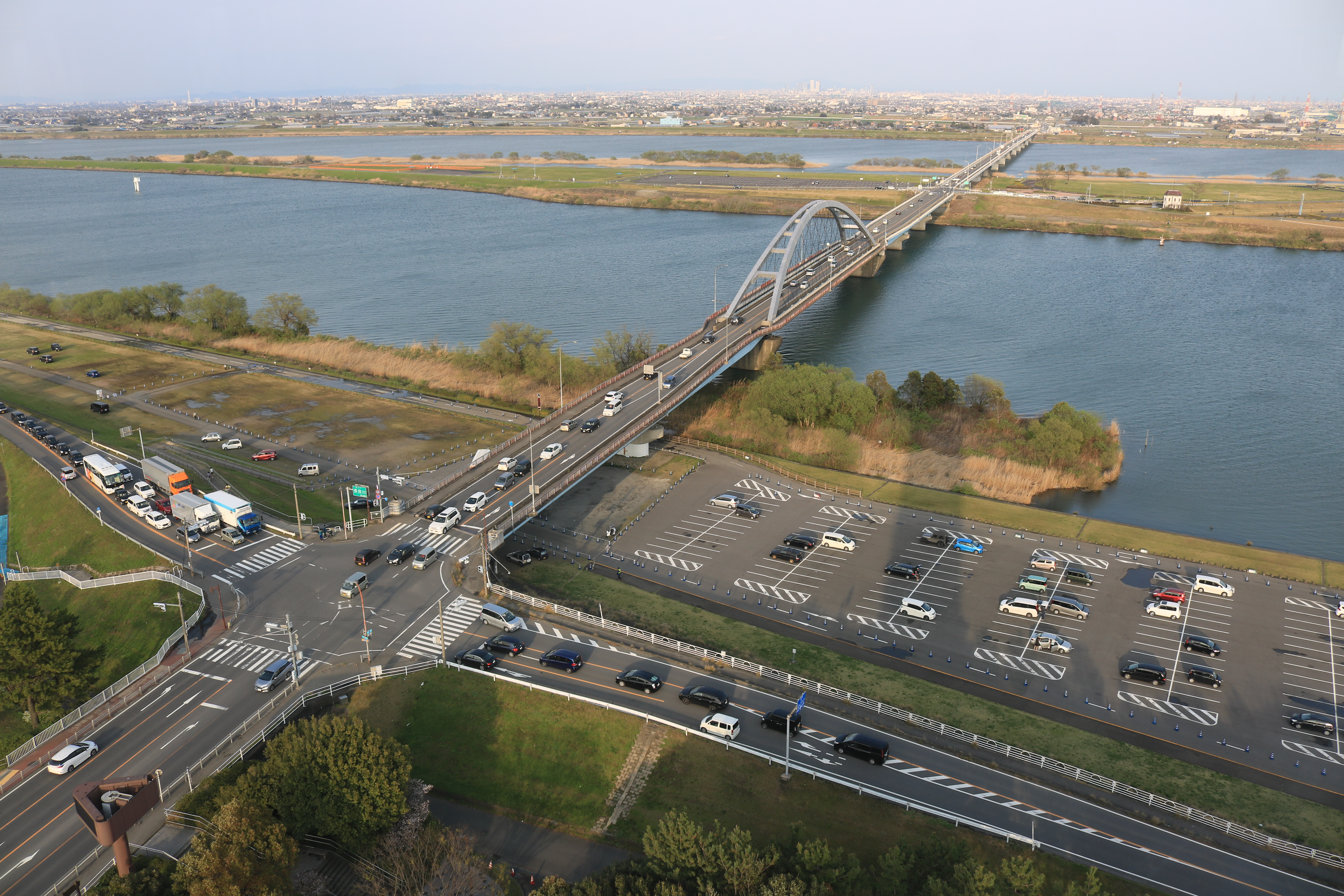
30.Aisai

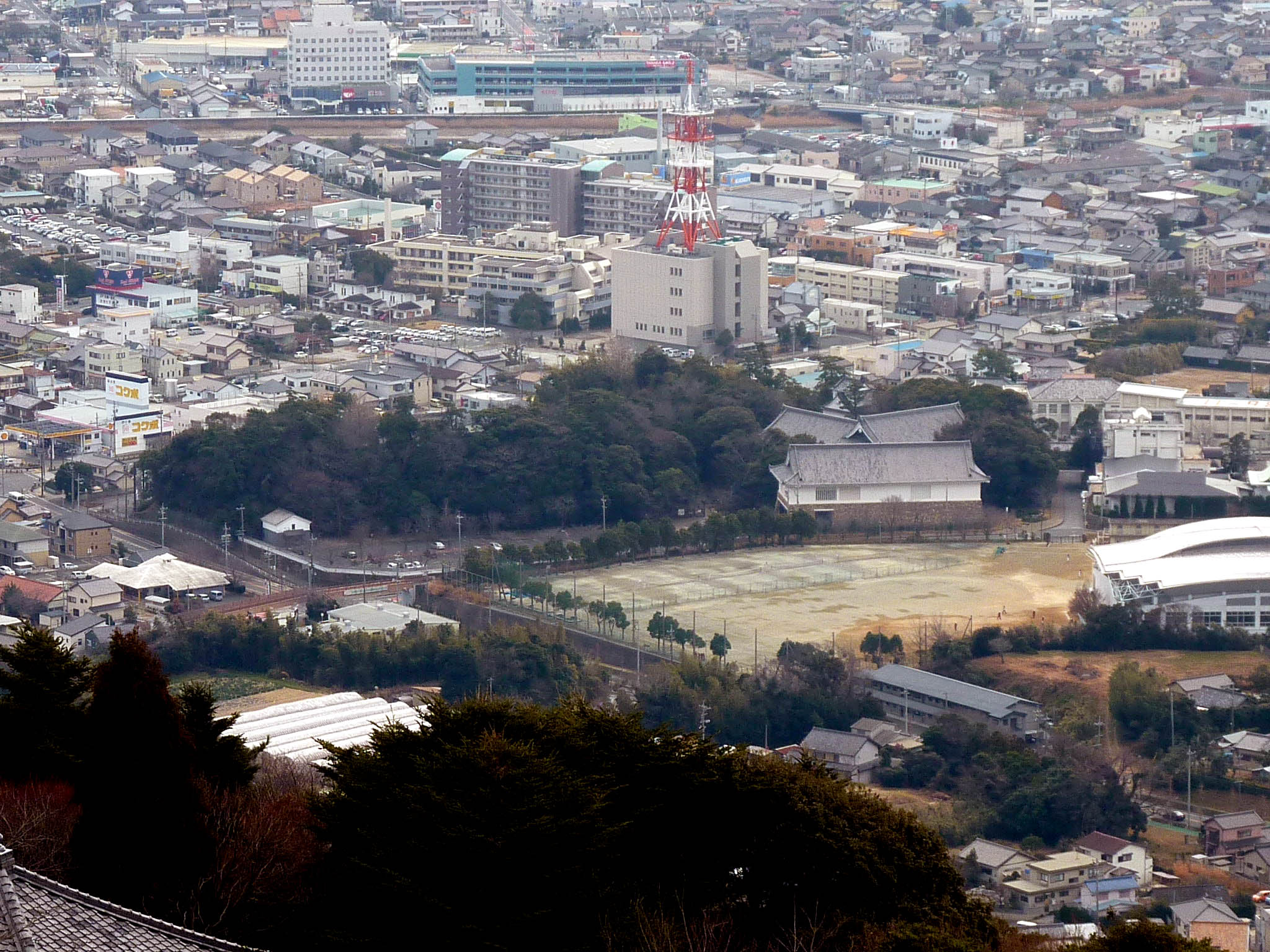
31.Tahara

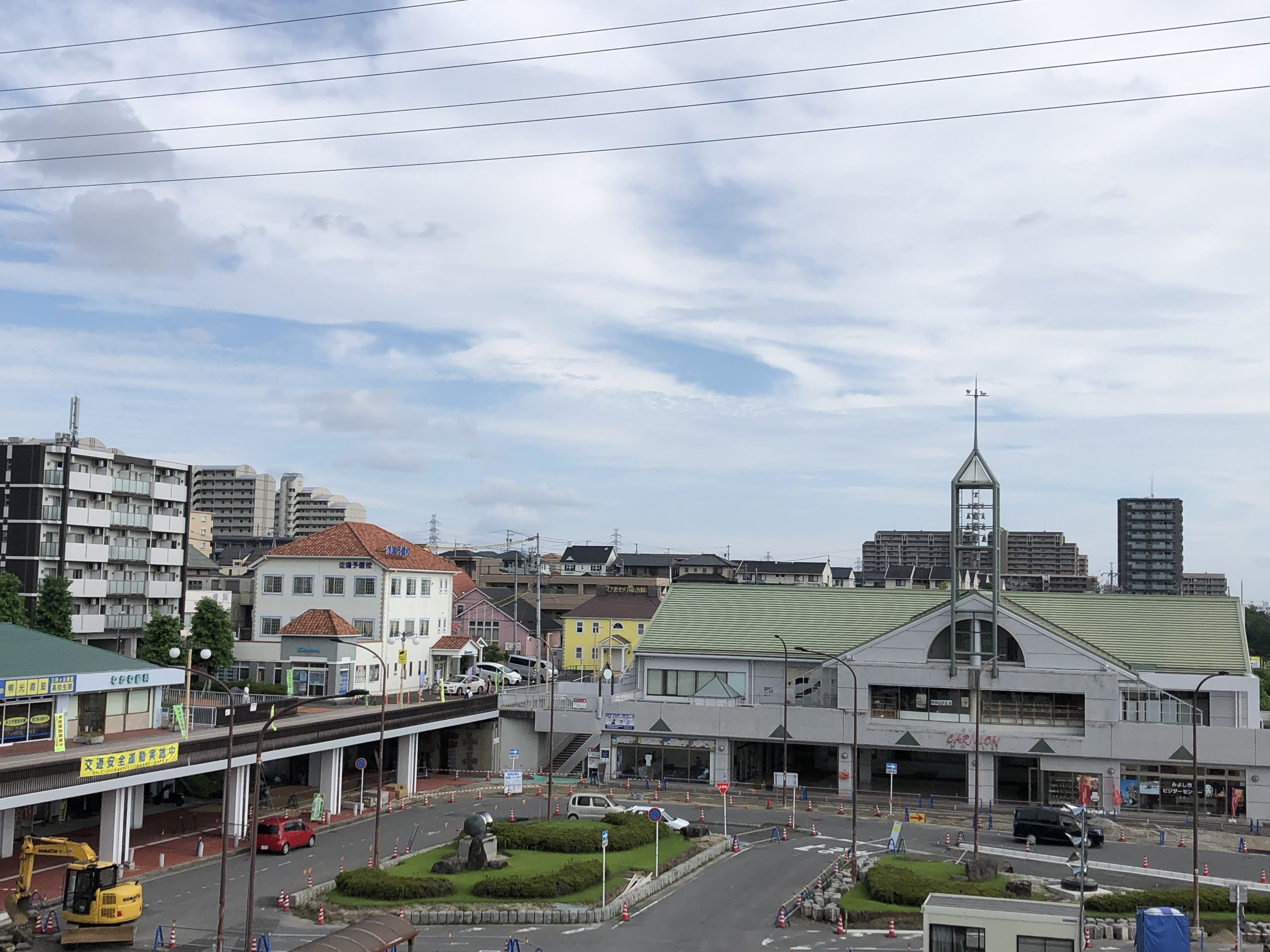
32.Miyoshi

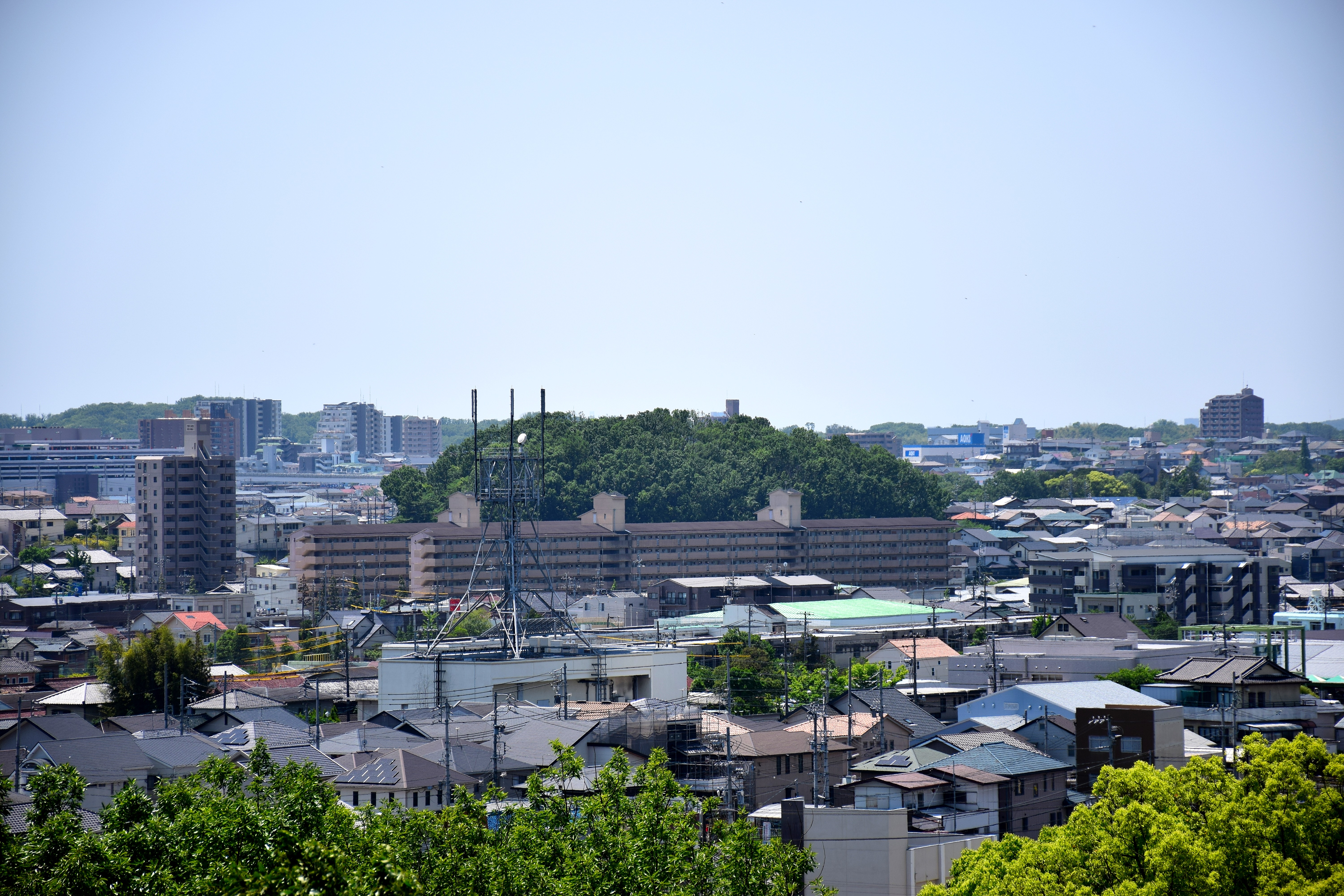
33.Nagakute

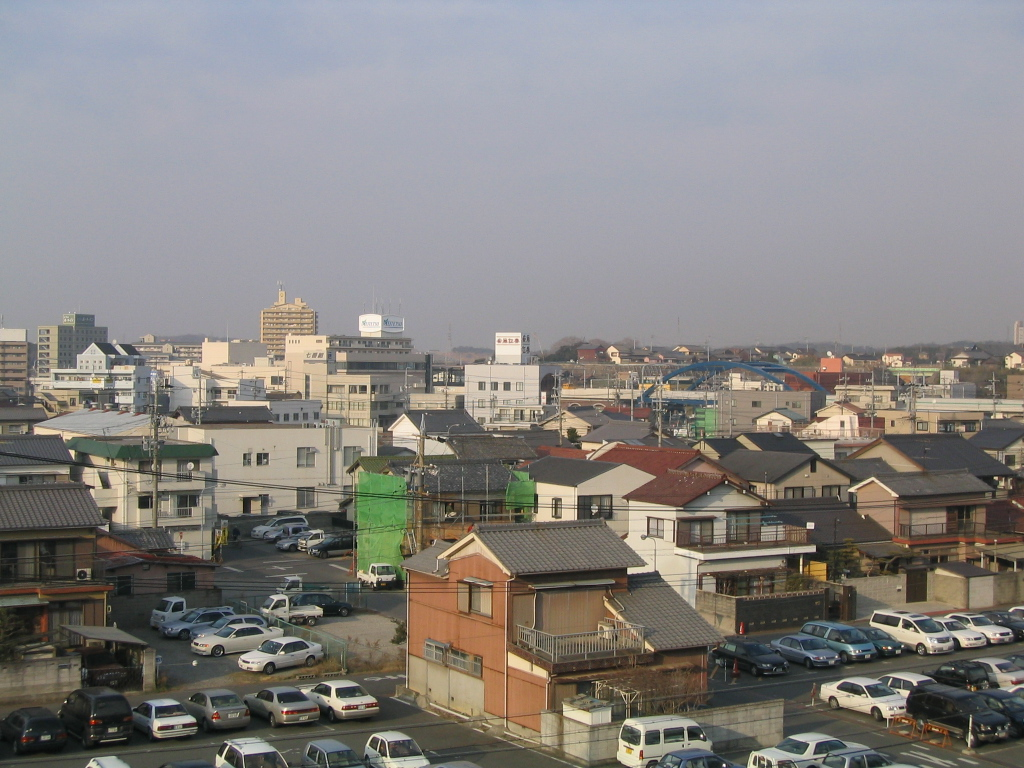
34.Tokoname

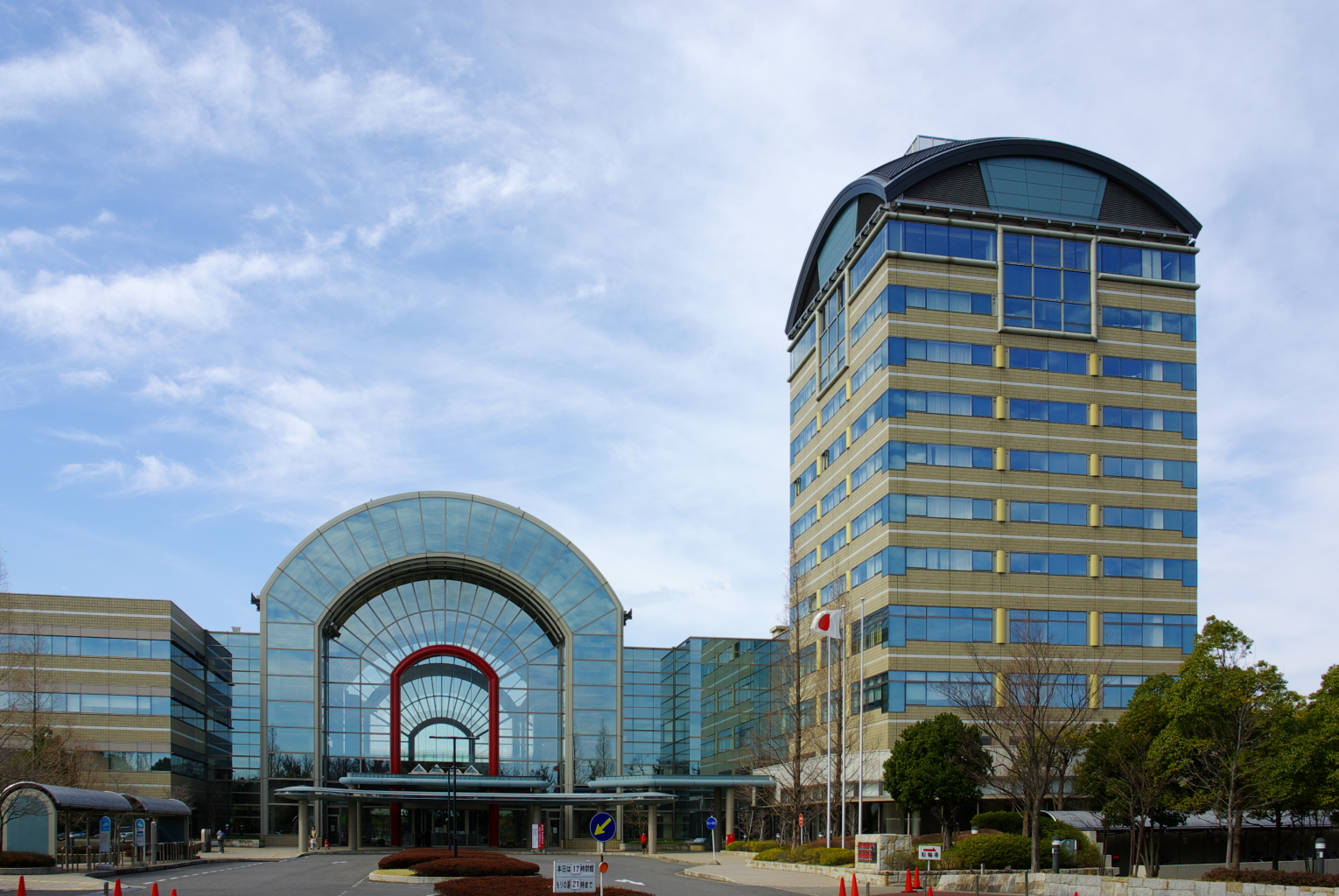
35.Higashiura

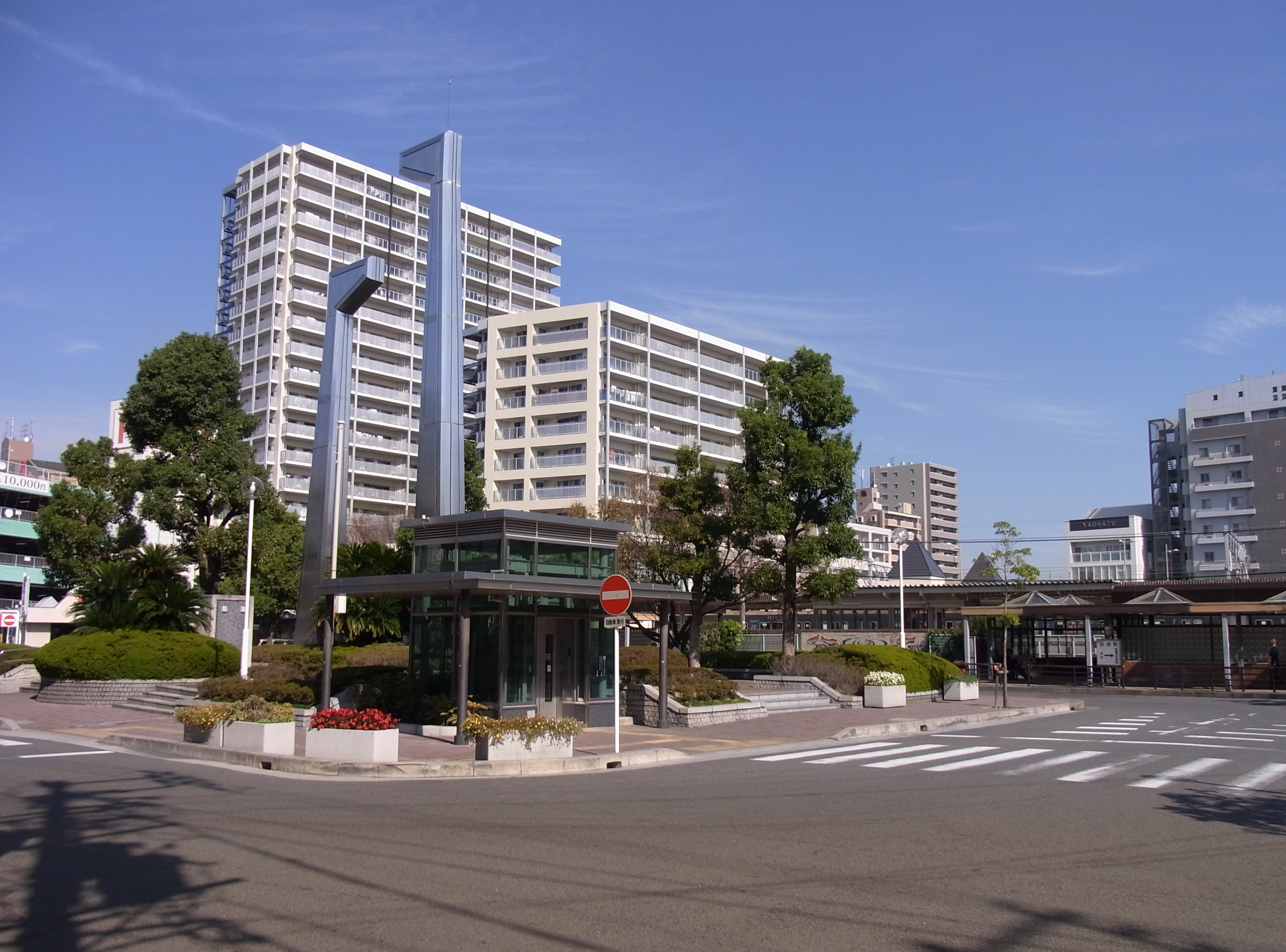
36.Iwakura

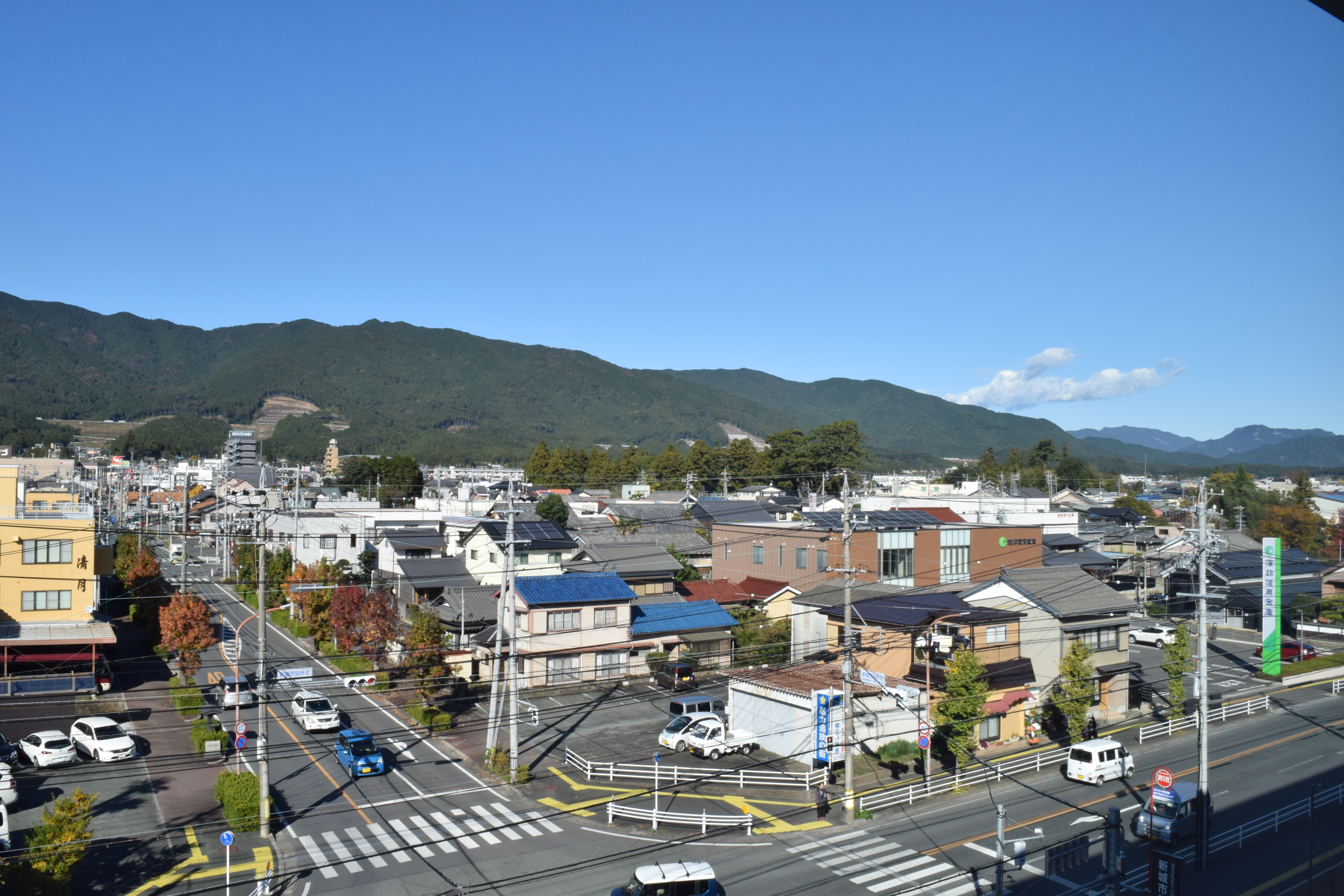
37.Shinshiro

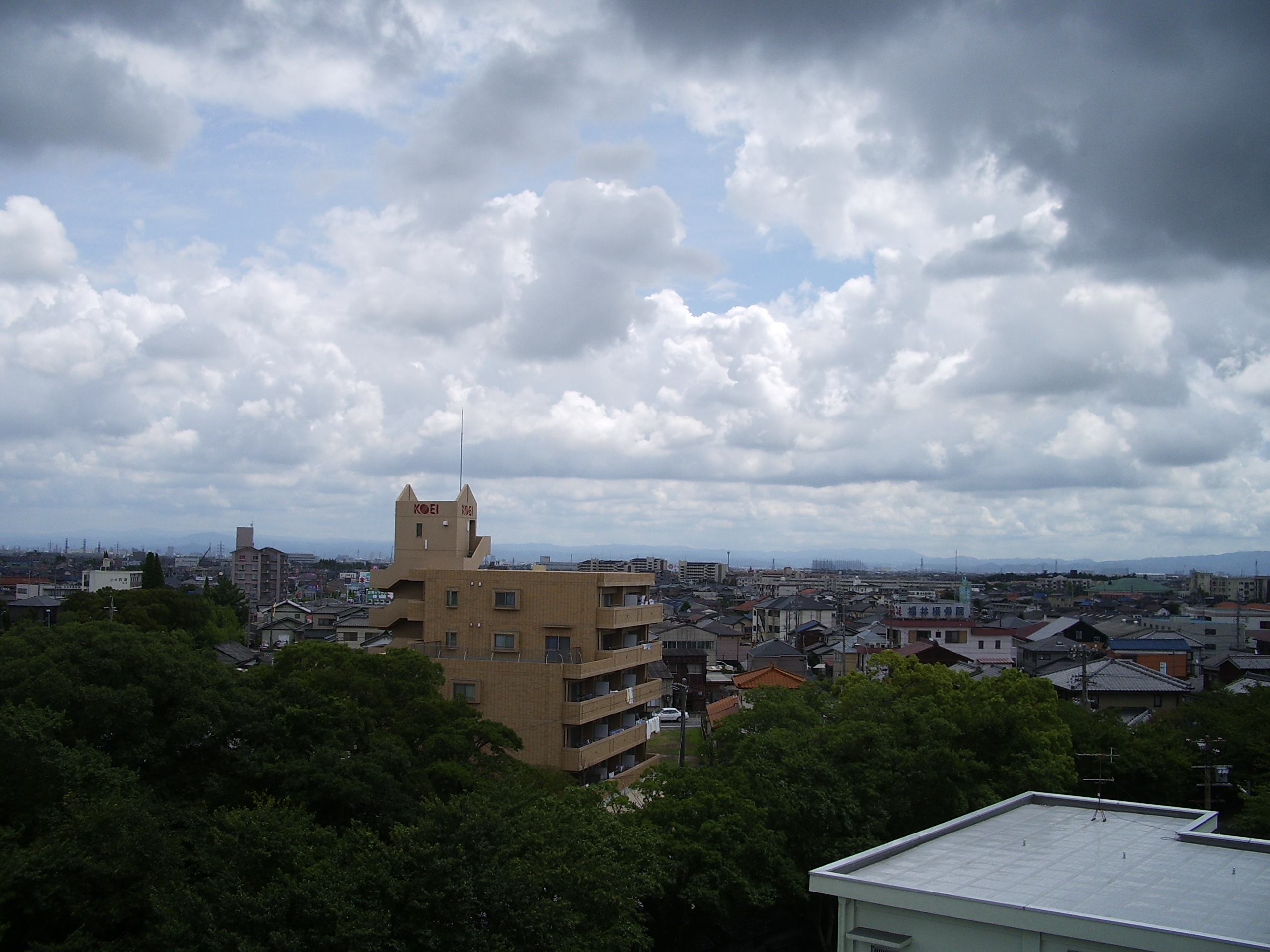
38.Takahama

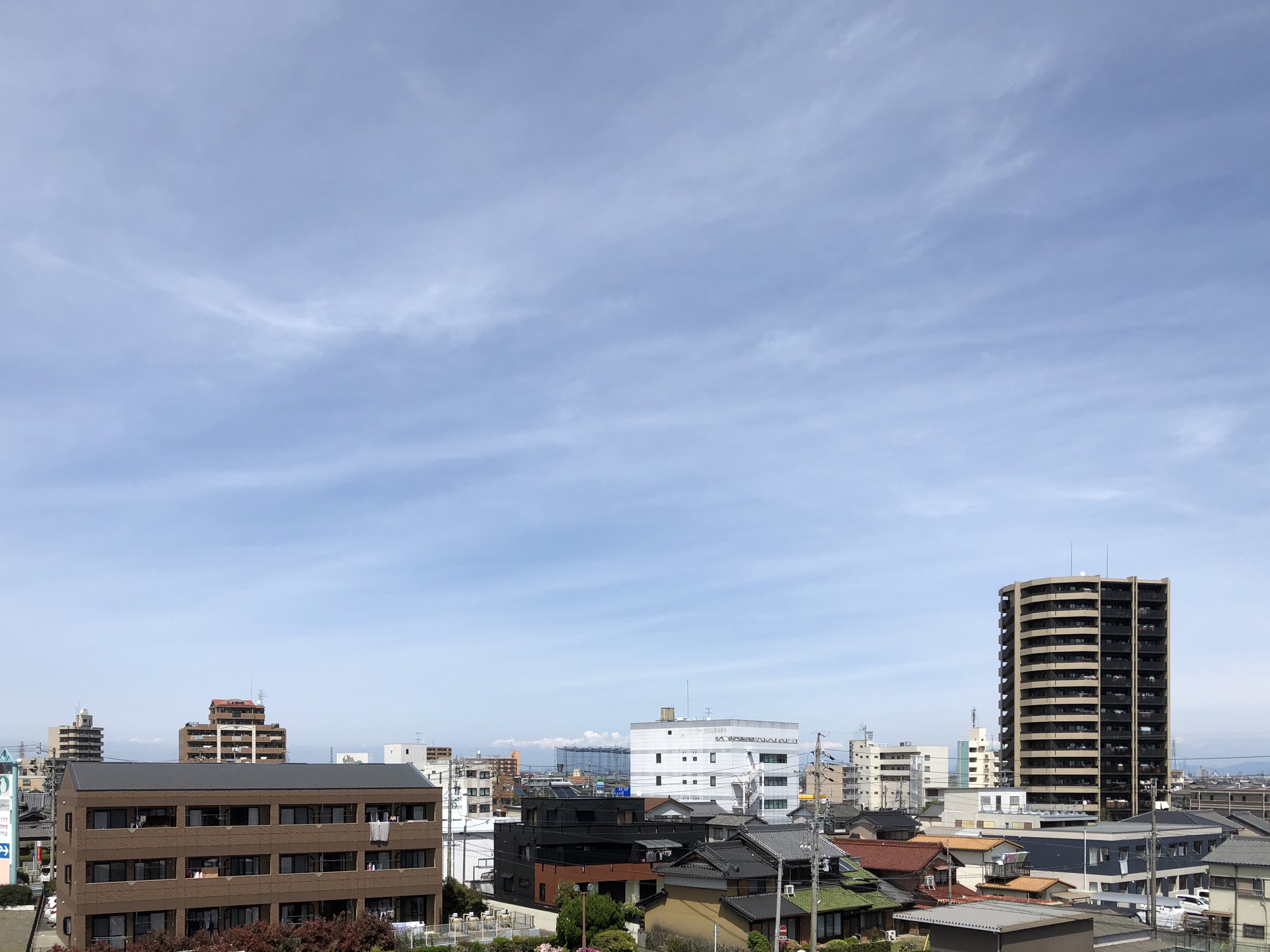
39.Yatomi

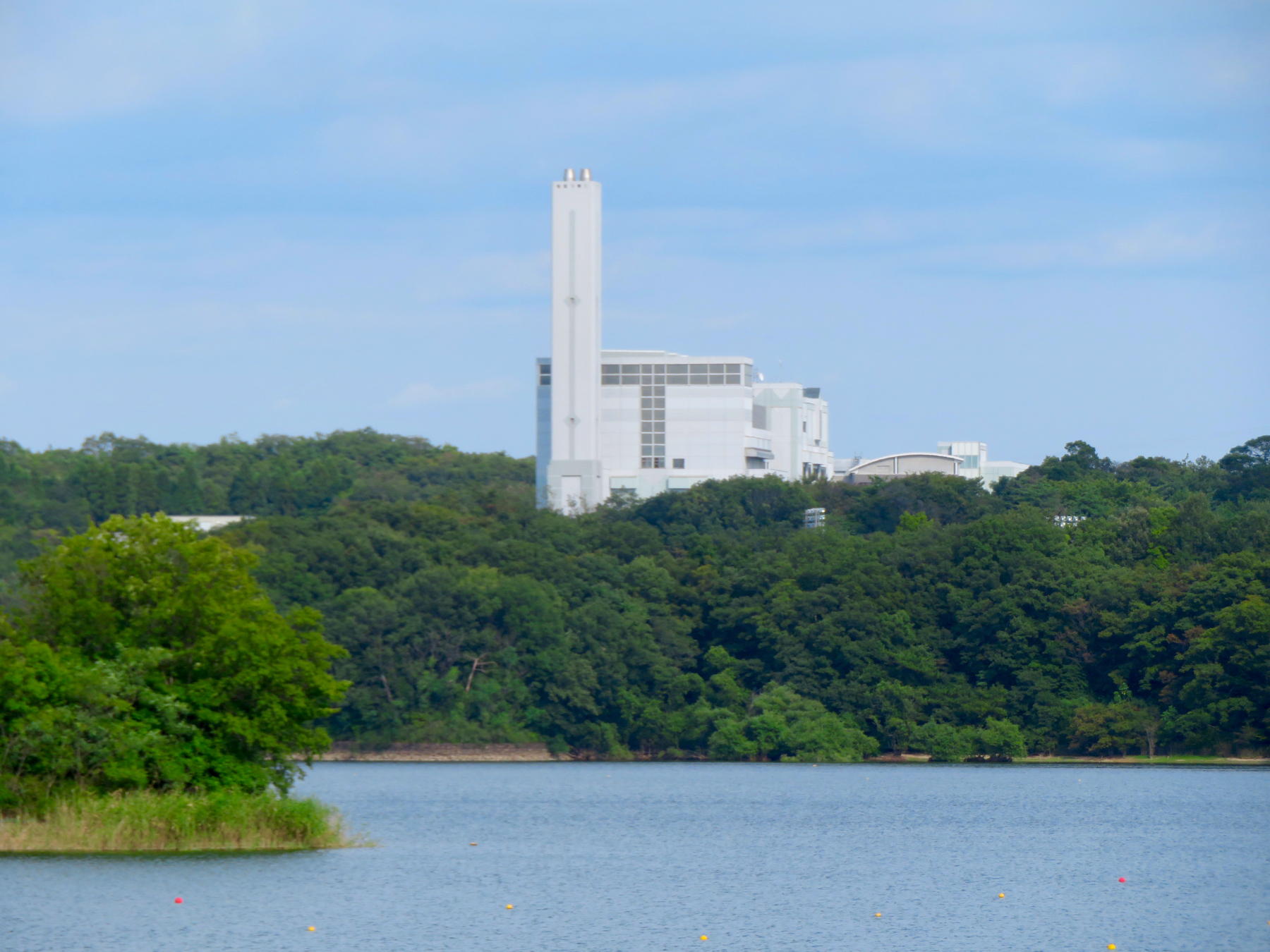
40.Tōgō

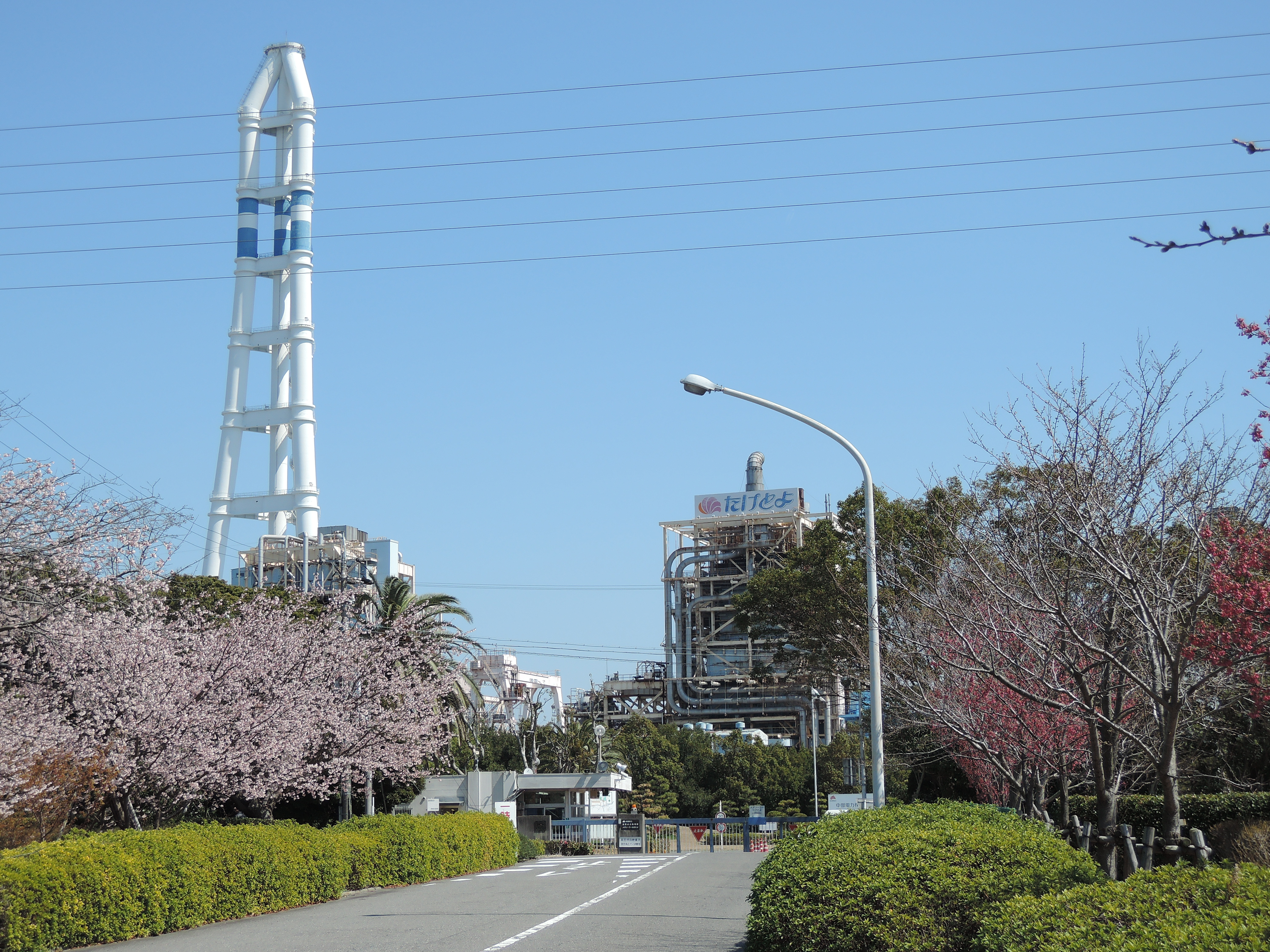
41.Taketoyo

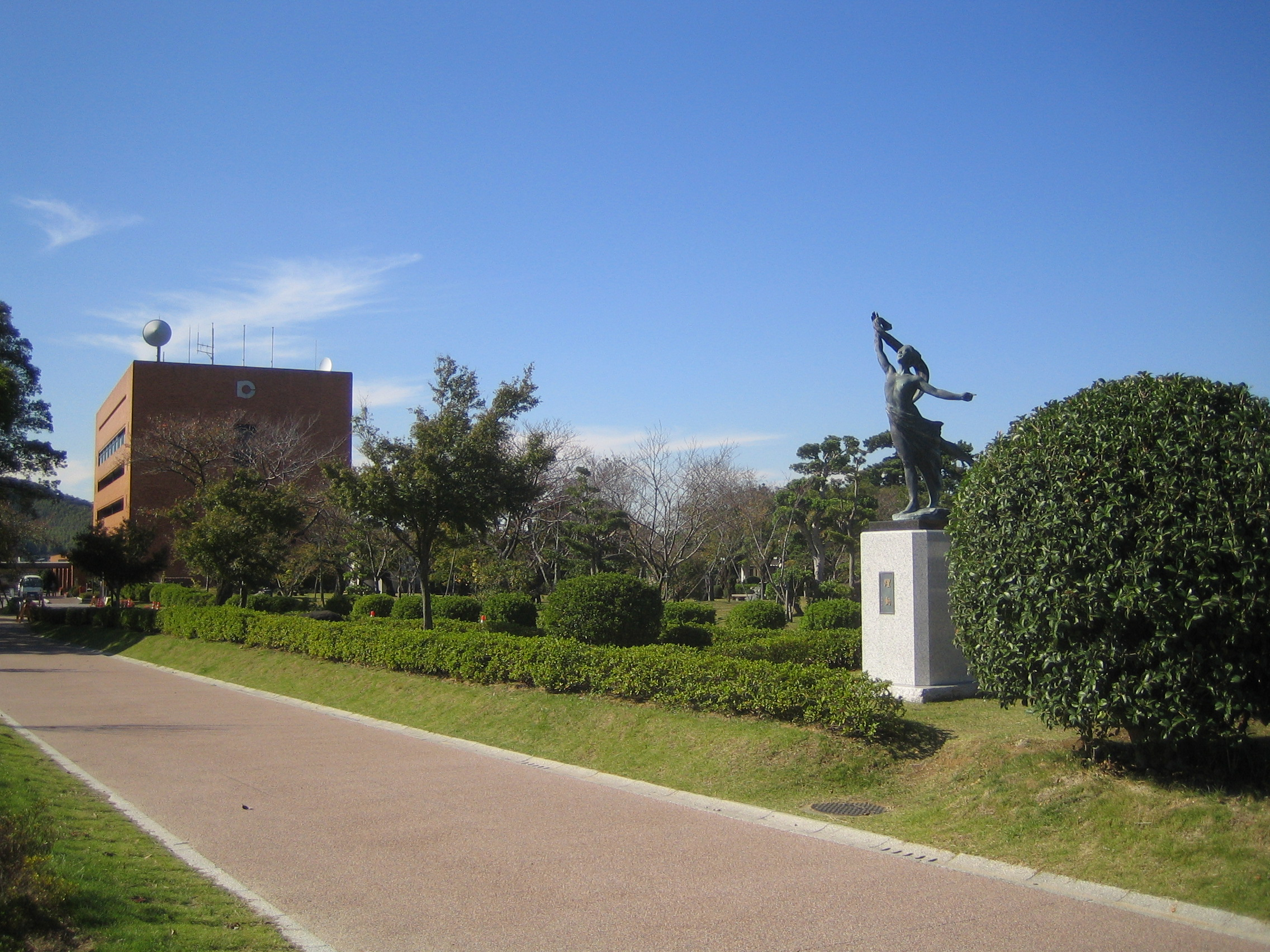
42.Kōta

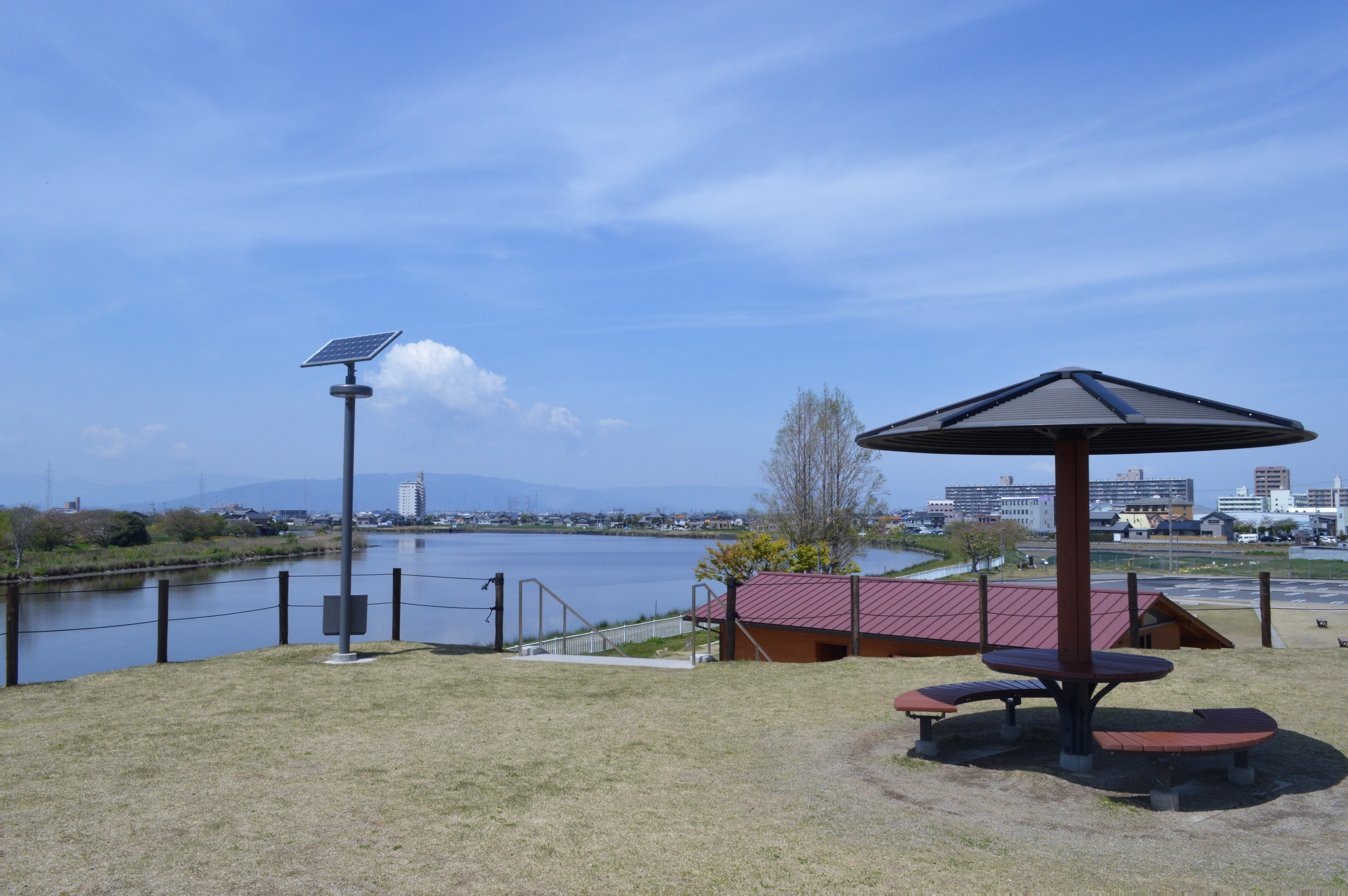
43.Kanie

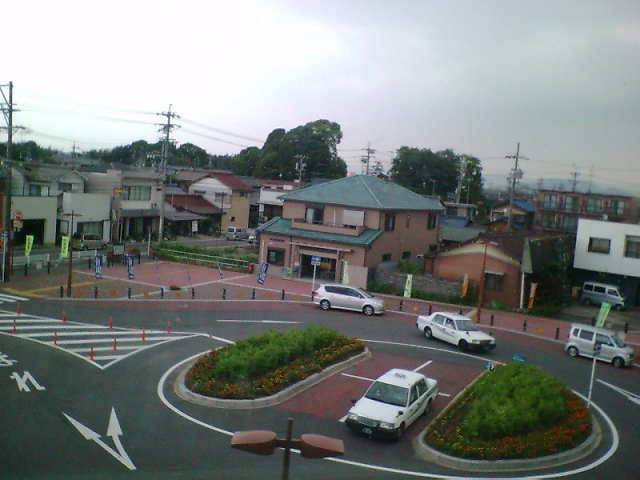
44.Fusō

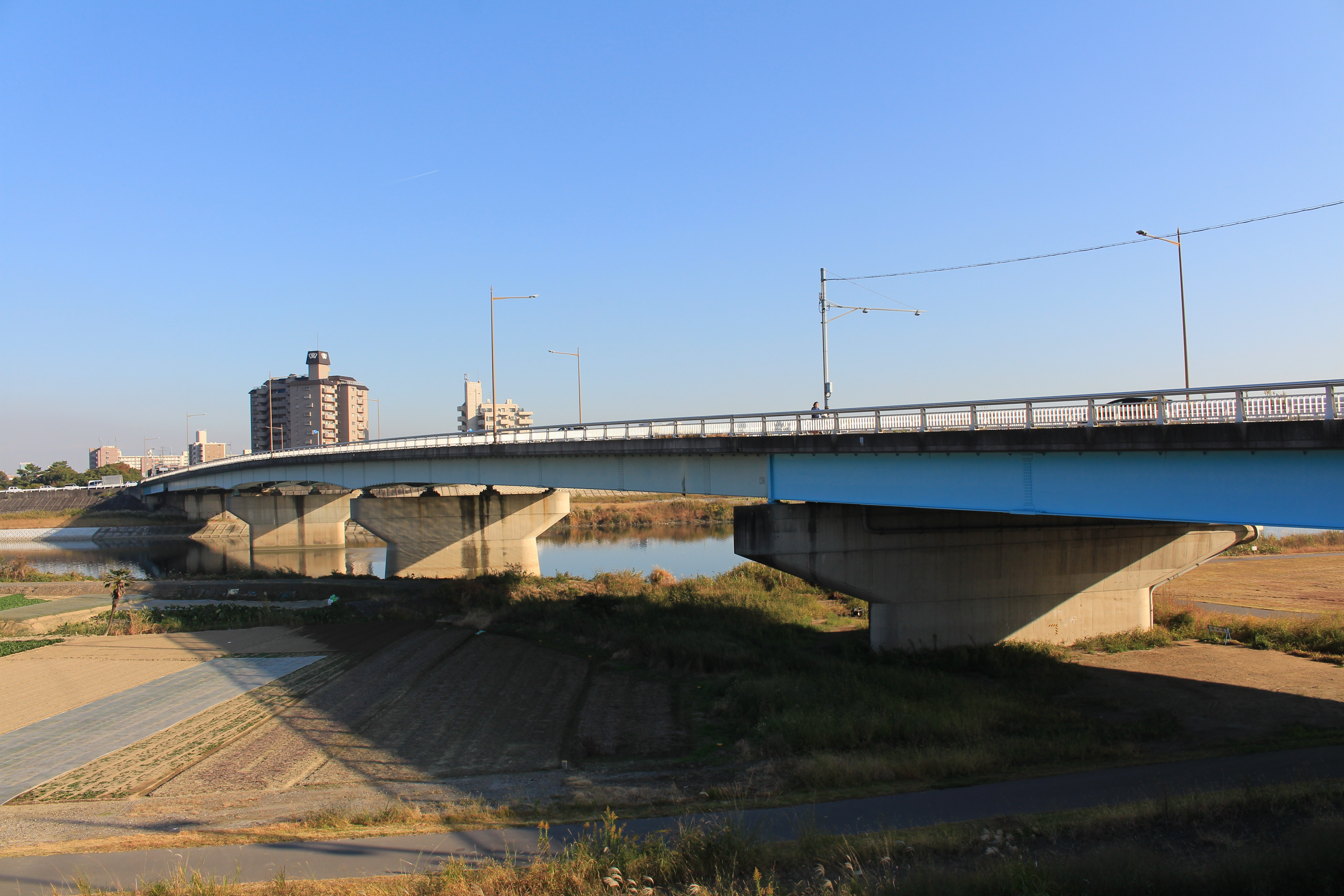
45.Ōharu

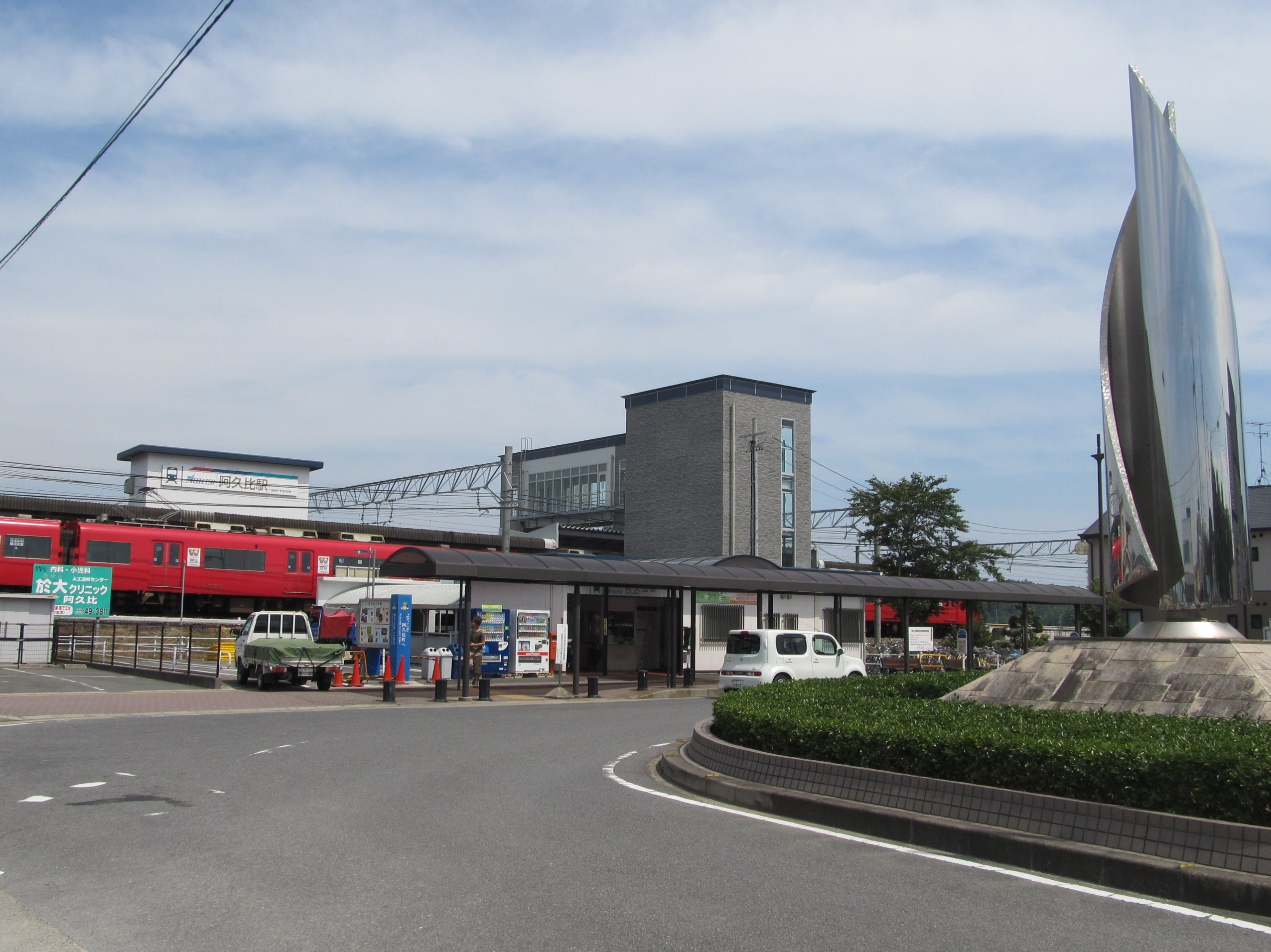
46.Agui

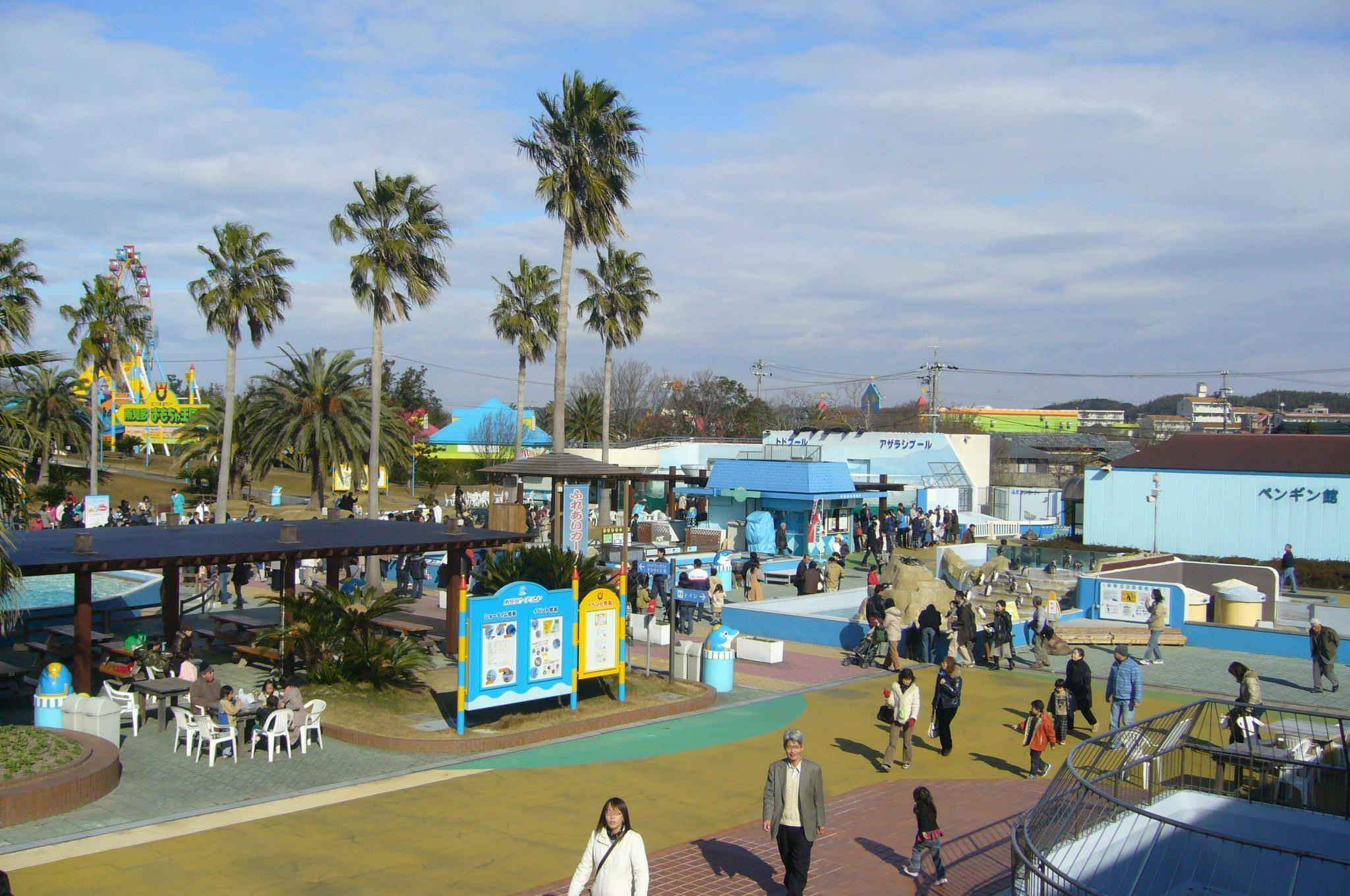
47.Mihama

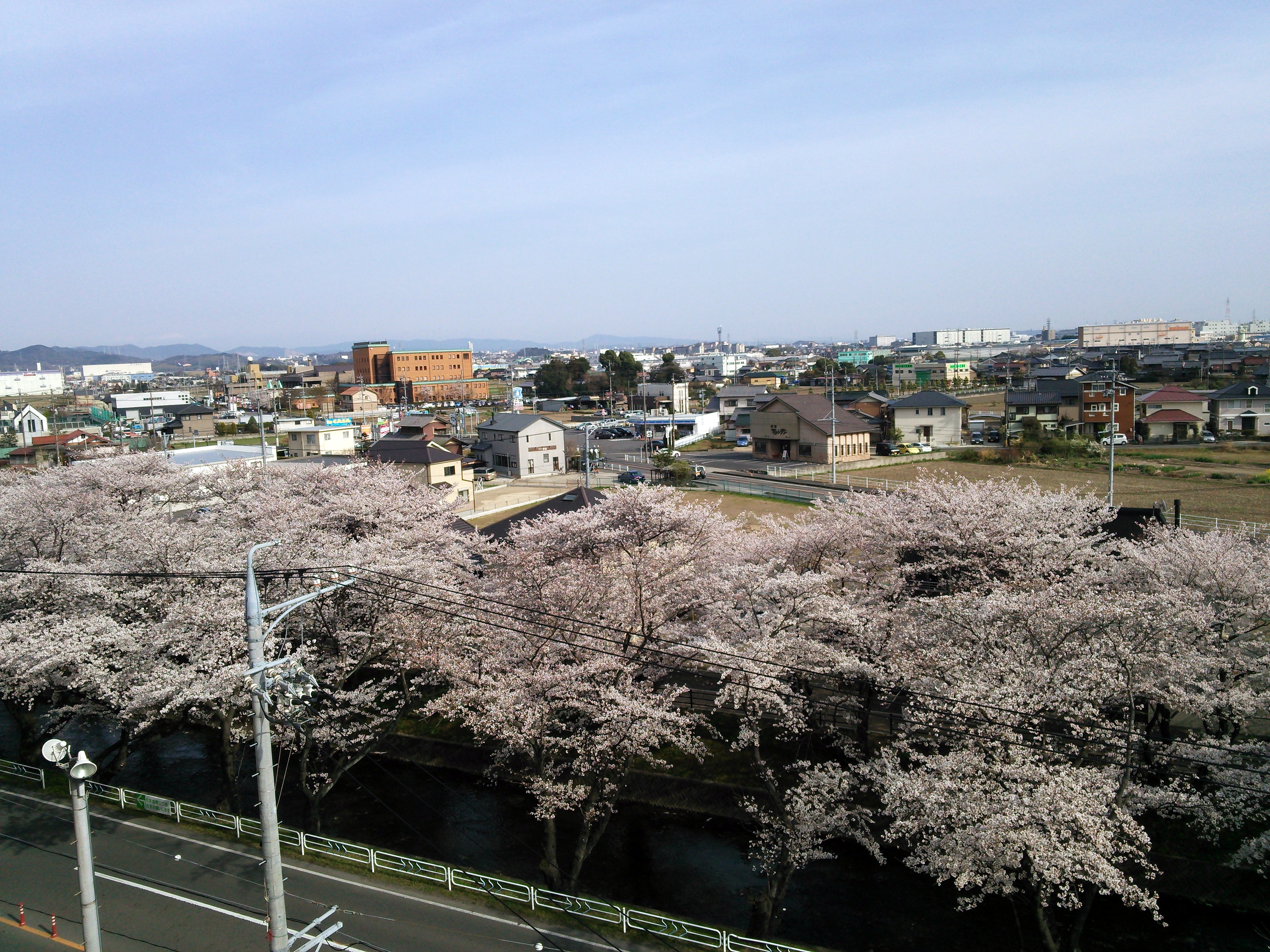
48.Ōguchi

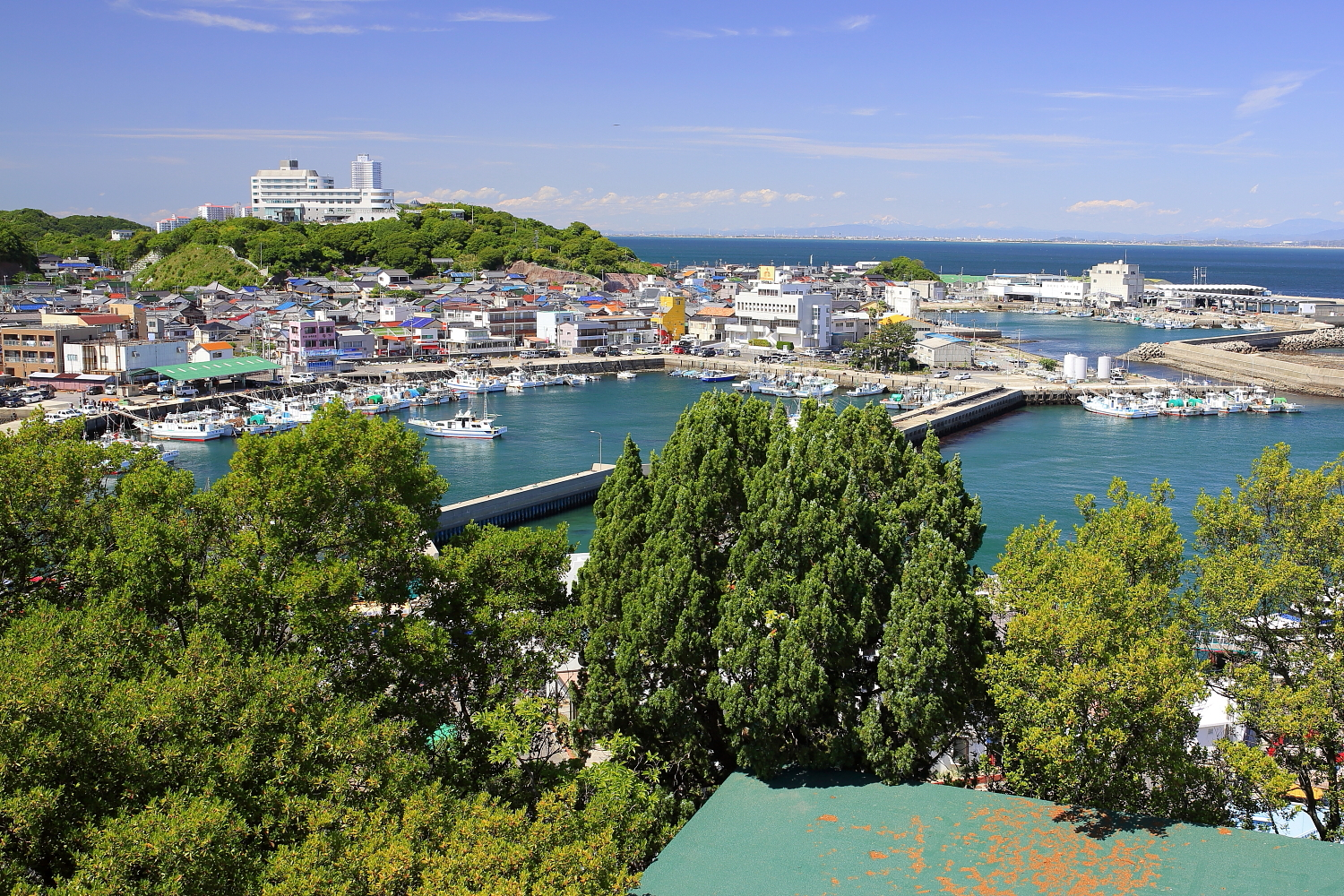
49.Minamichita

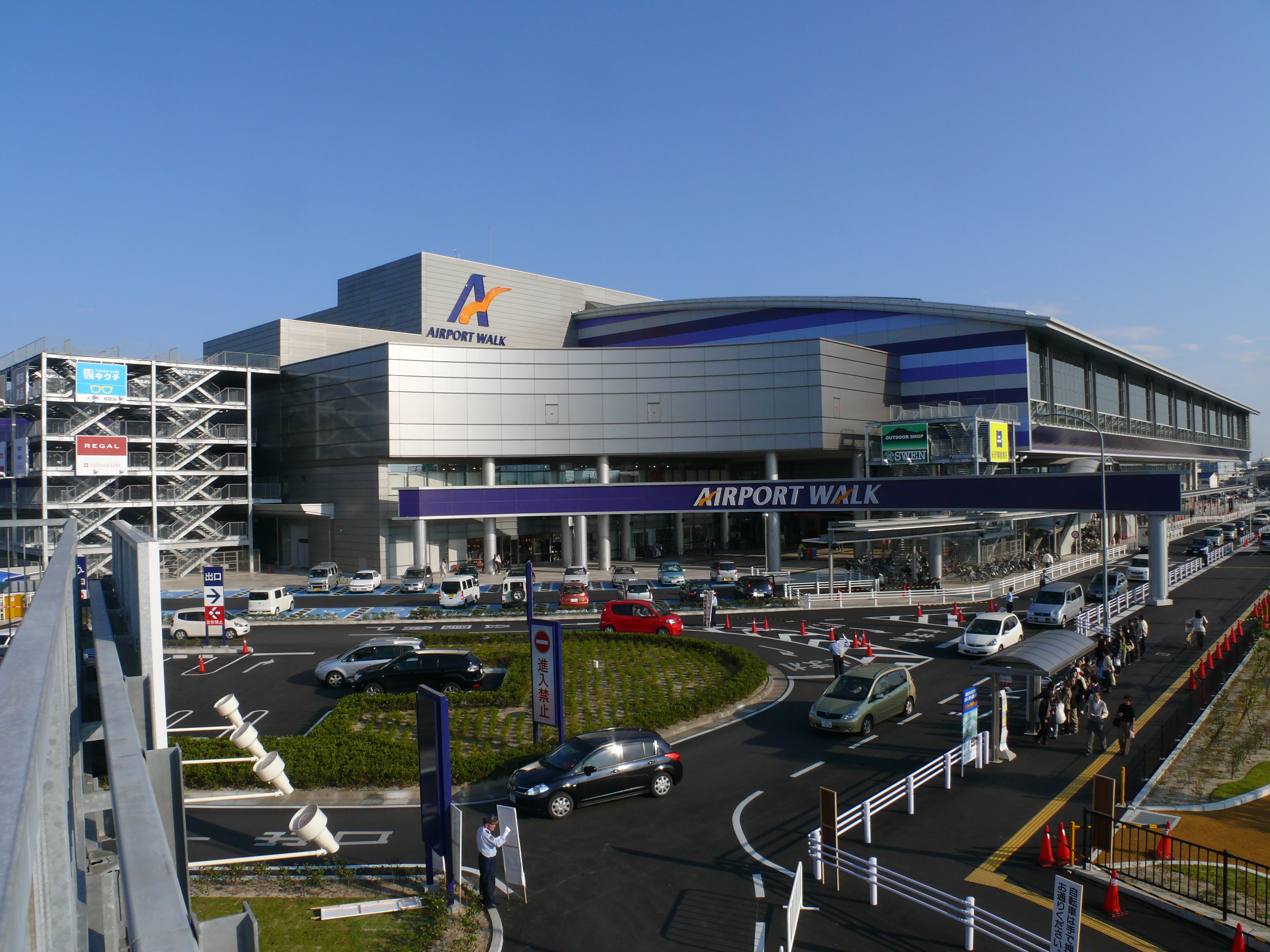
50.Toyoyama

Others

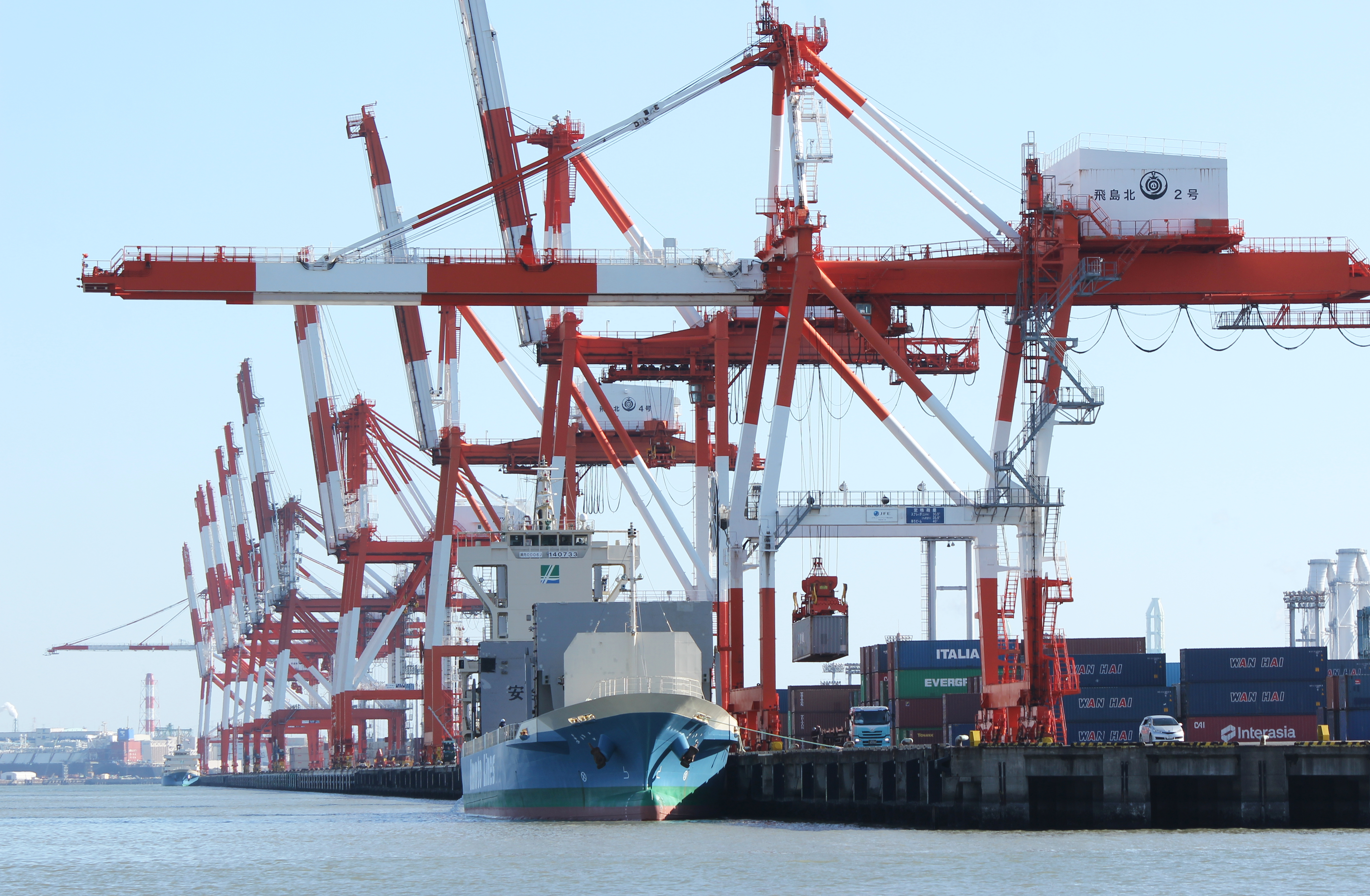
51.Tobishima

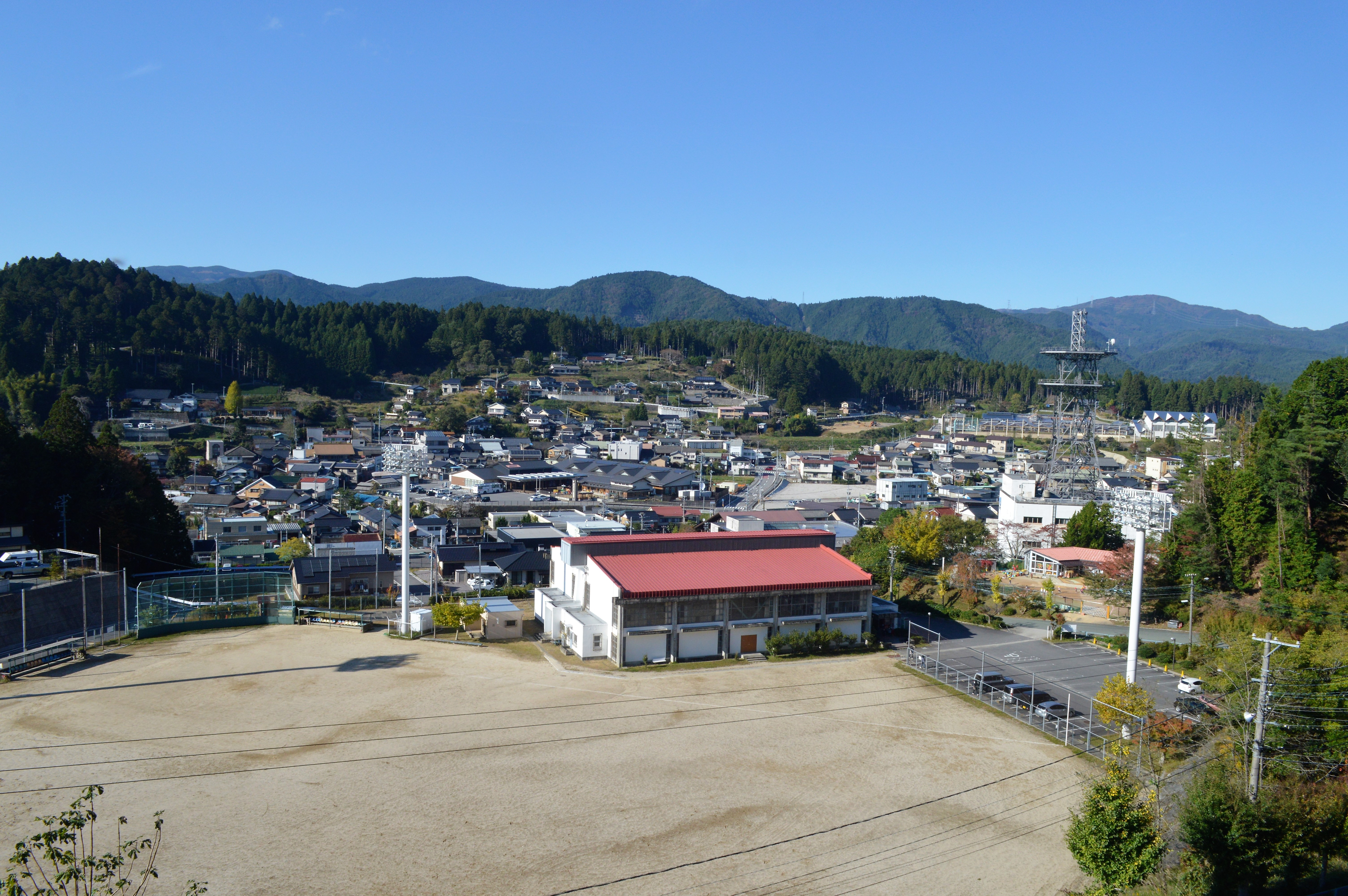
52.Shitara

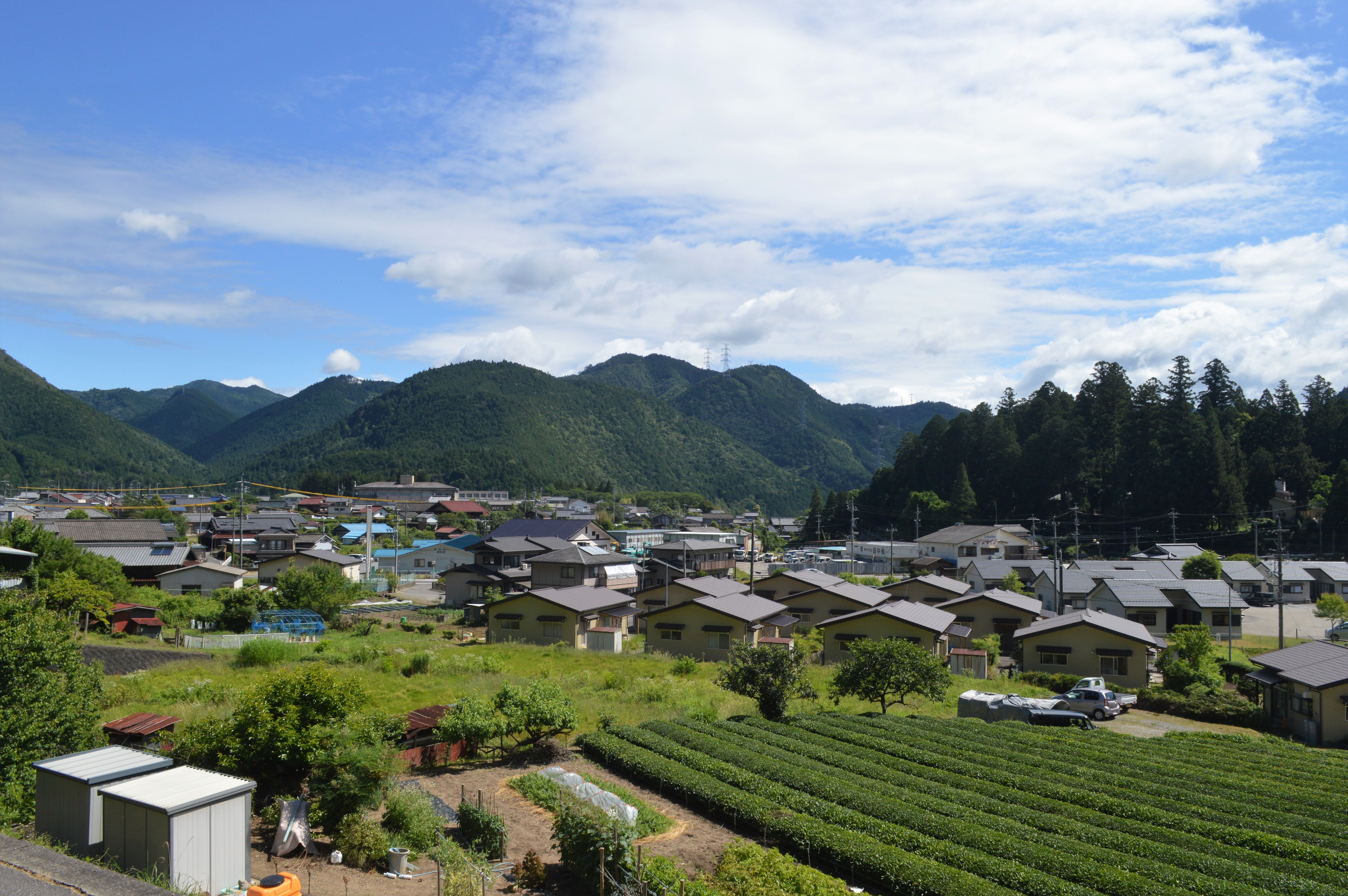
53.Tōei

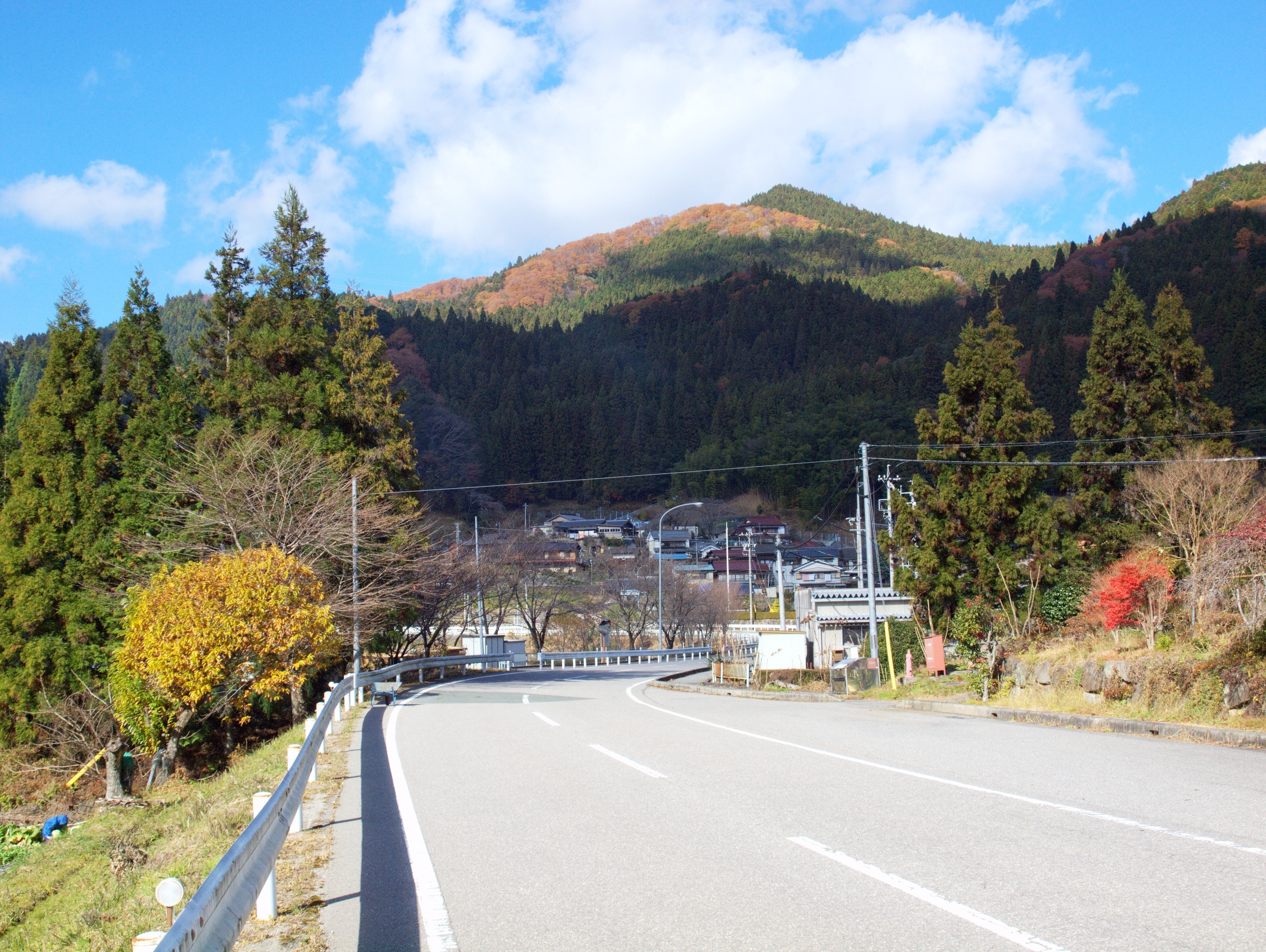
54.Toyone
