= Ogawa Station (Aichi) =

Railway station in Higashiura, Aichi Prefecture, Japan

CE02 Ogawa Station 緒川駅
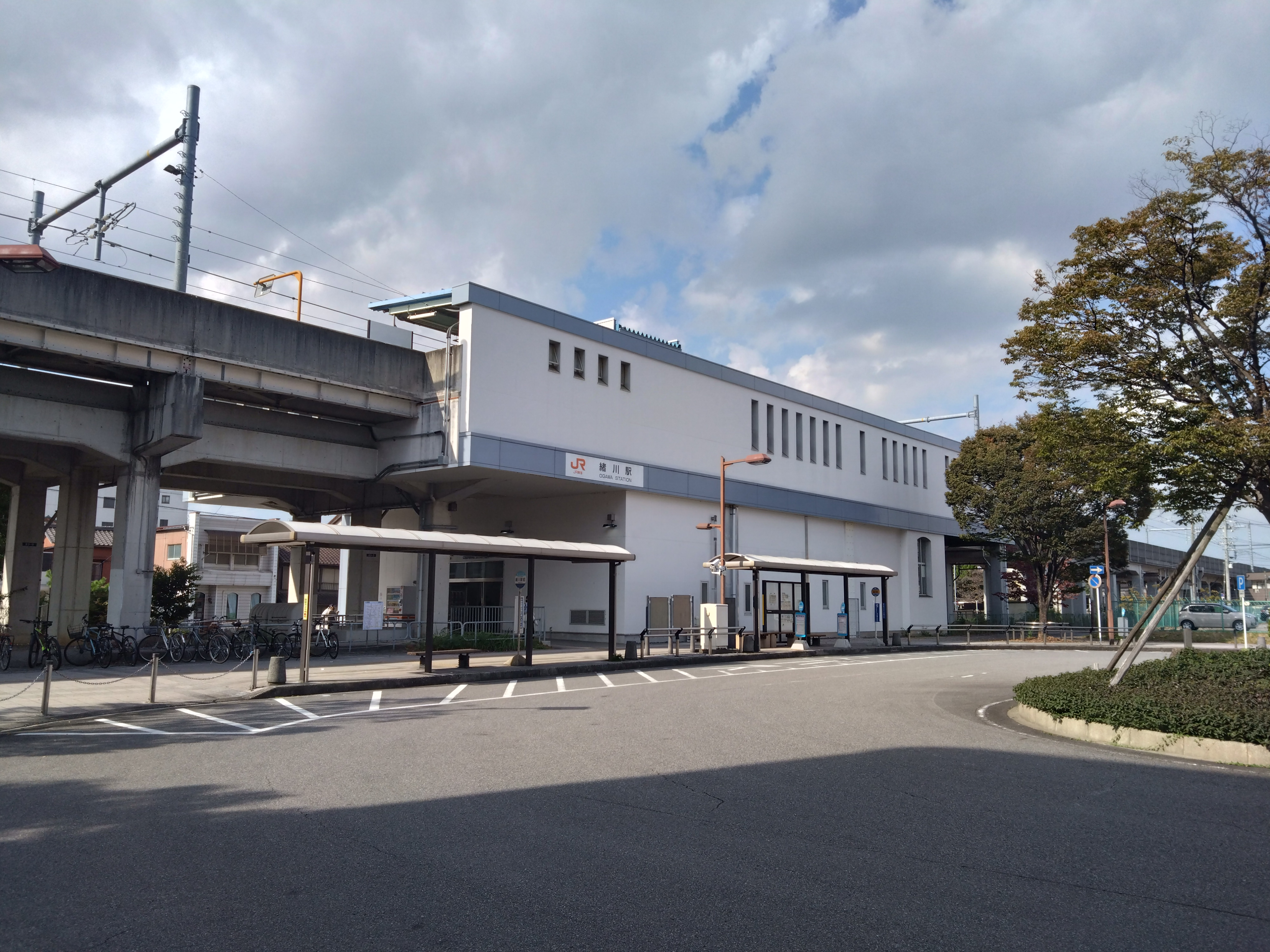
- Ogawa Station in November 2024

General information
- Location: Takezuka-1 Ogawa, Higashiura, Chita-gun, Aichi-ken 470-2102; Japan
- Coordinates: 34.9812°N 136.9717°E
- Operator: JR Central
- Line: Taketoyo Line
- Distance: 3.1 kilometers from Ōbu
- Platforms: 2 side platforms

Construction
- Accessible: Yes

Other information
- Status: Unstaffed
- Station code: CE02

History
- Opened: March 1, 1900

Passengers
- FY2022: 3,311 daily

Services
Preceding station	JR Central	Following station
Owari-Morioka towards Ōbu	Taketoyo Line	Ishihama towards Taketoyo
Location
- Location within Aichi Prefecture Location within Japan

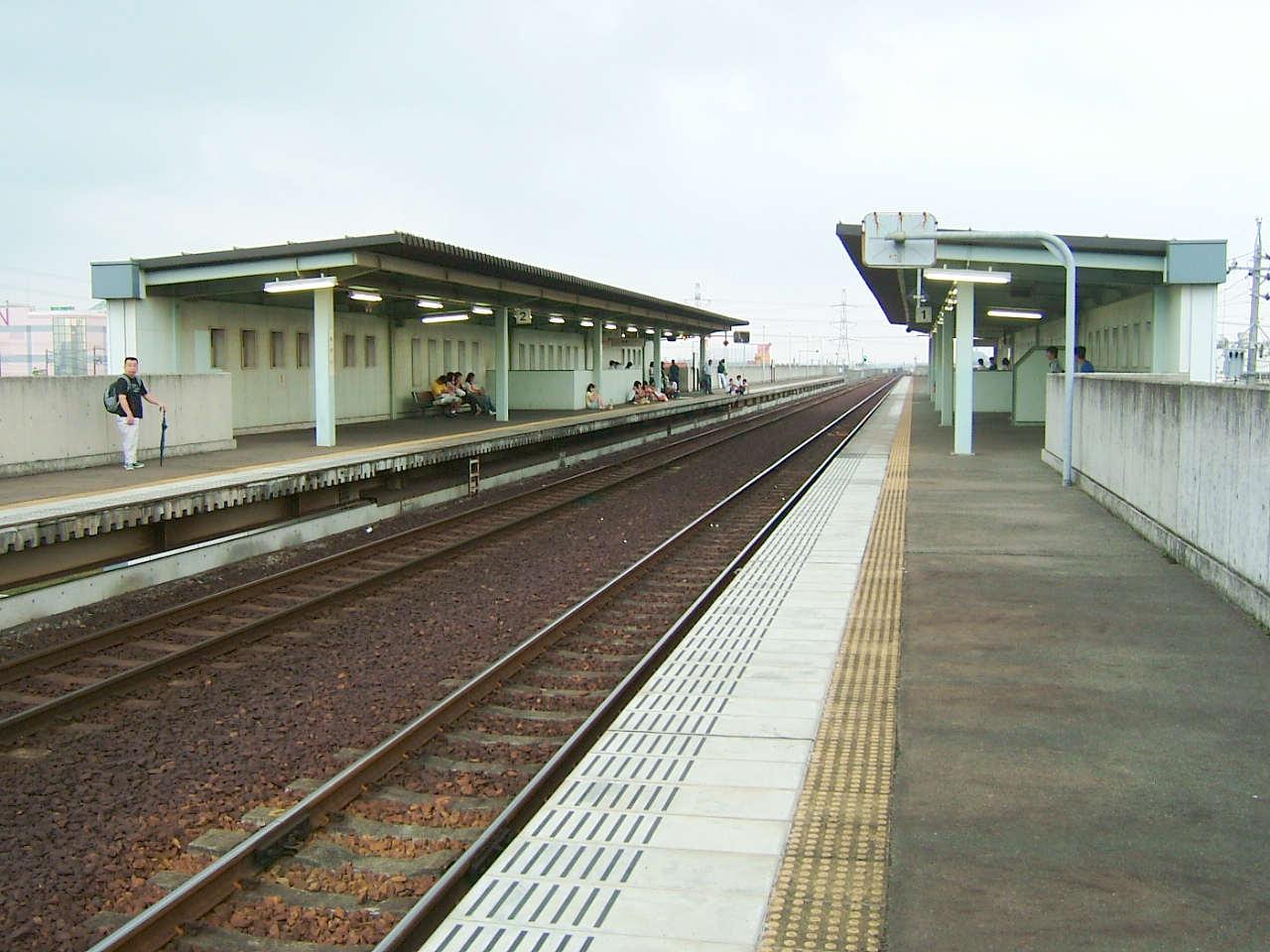
Platform when the line was not electrified

Ogawa Station (緒川駅, Ogawa-eki) is a railway station in the town of Higashiura, Chita District, Aichi Prefecture, Japan, operated by Central Japan Railway Company (JR Tōkai).

== Overview ==
Ogawa Station is served by the Taketoyo Line, and is located 3.1 kilometers from the starting point of the line at Ōbu Station.

== History ==
The first Ogawa Station was opened in March 1886 following the opening of Taketoyo Line, which at the time connected Atsuta Station with Taketoyo Station. It was closed when Ōbu Station opened north of the station a year later. The village of Ogawa, which is now a part of Higashiura petitioned the Ministry of Communications to reopen the station to promote the village. As a result, the second Ogawa Station opened on March 1, 1900, as a passenger-only station on the Japanese Government Railways (JGR). Freight operations commenced from April 1, 1903, and the station building was reconstructed at that time.

The JGR became the Japan National Railway (JNR) after World War II. Freight operations were discontinued due to Kinuura Rinkai Railway Handa Line commencing operations and the freight-only line between the two lines were deconstructed on November 15, 1975. Small parcel operations were terminated on February 1, 1984. With the privatization and dissolution of the JNR on April 1, 1987, the station came under the control of the Central Japan Railway Company. Automatic turnstiles were installed in May 1992, and the TOICA system of magnetic fare cards was implemented in November 2006. On February 19, 1995, the station and the nearby section was elevated. Station numbering was introduced to the Taketoyo Line in March 2018; Ogawa Station was assigned station number CE02. As a part of JR Central's aim to make every station with more than 3,000 users per day accessible, a pair of elevators and multipurpose toilets have been installed in 2020.

== Station layout ==
The station has two elevated opposed side platforms, with the station building located underneath. The station has automated ticket machines, TOICA automated turnstiles and is unattended. The station has two catch points at the end of the tracks. Like any other stations in Taketoyo Line, with an exception of Owari-Morioka Station, the station is interchangeable.

=== Platforms ===
1	■ Taketoyo Line	for Ōbu
2	■ Taketoyo Line	for Taketoyo

== Services ==
The station is primarily served by local service on the Taketoyo line between Obu and Taketoyo. Semi-rapid services providing through service to Nagoya Station depart during rush hours. Passenger trains serve the Ogawa Station for roughly 18.5 hours a day from 5:59 a.m. to 11:25 p.m. Trains depart the station roughly every 30 minutes during daytime, although up to four trains will depart on each platform during peak hours. In fiscal 2022, the station was used by an average of 3,311 passengers daily.

The roundabout located east of the station also serves as a bus terminal for services operated by Chita Noriai and Higashiura.

== See also ==
- List of railway stations in Japan
