= Ishihama Station =

Railway station in Higashiura, Aichi Prefecture, Japan

CE03 Ishihama Station 石浜駅
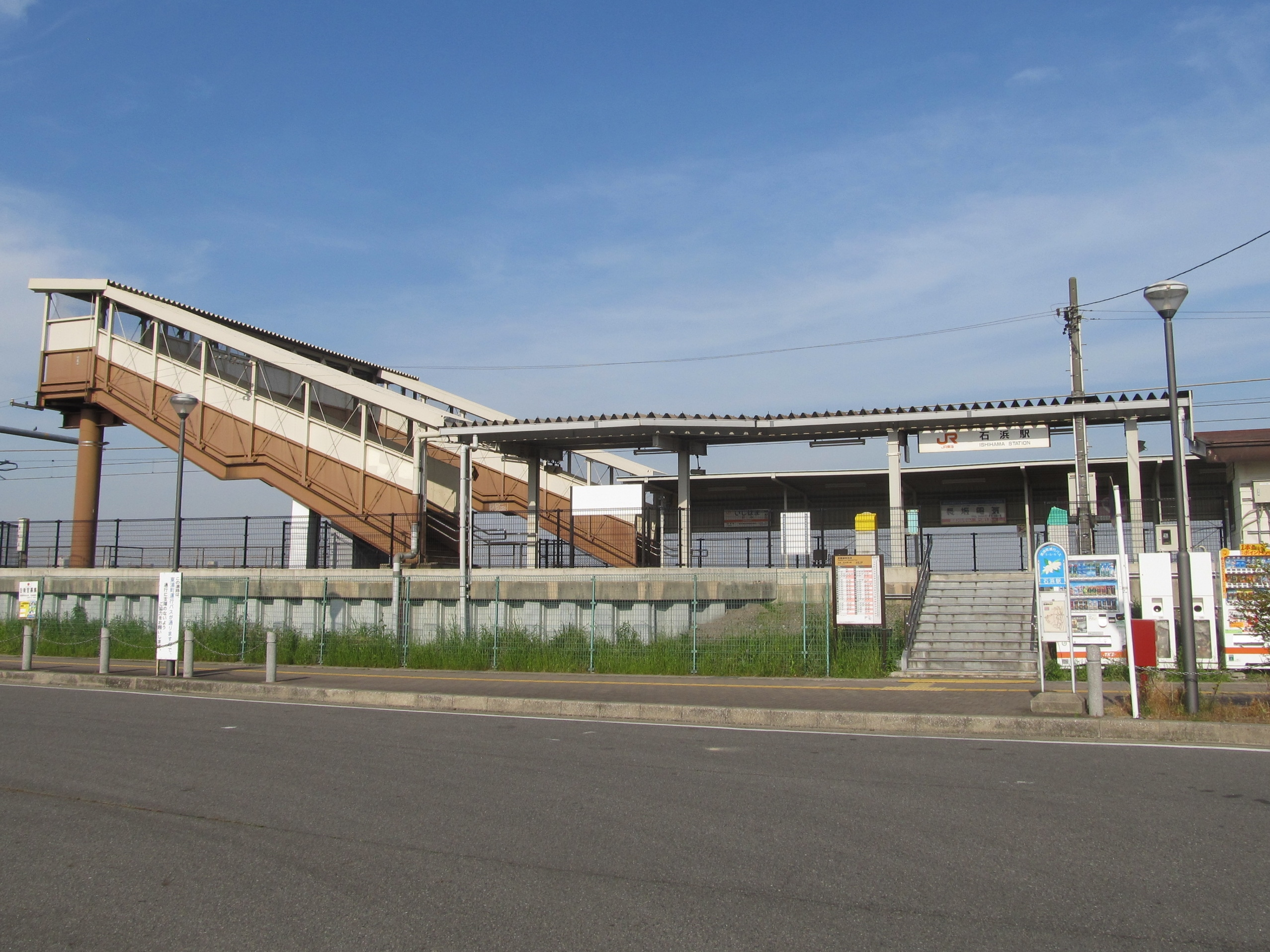
- Ishihama Station in November 2022

General information
- Location: Nakane-13 Ishihama, Higashiura, Chita-gun, Aichi-ken 470-2103; Japan
- Coordinates: 34.9682°N 136.9732°E
- Operator: JR Central
- Line: Taketoyo Line
- Distance: 4.6 kilometers from Ōbu
- Platforms: 2 side platforms

Other information
- Status: Unstaffed
- Station code: CE03

History
- Opened: April 15, 1957

Passengers
- FY2017: 1221 daily

Services
Preceding station	JR Central	Following station
Ogawa towards Ōbu	Taketoyo Line Local Semi Rapid	Higashiura towards Taketoyo
Location
- Location within Aichi Prefecture Location within Japan

Ishihama Station (石浜駅, Ishihama-eki) is a railway station in the town of Higashiura, Chita District, Aichi Prefecture, Japan, operated by Central Japan Railway Company (JR Tōkai).

Ishihama Station is served by the Taketoyo Line, and is located 4.6 kilometers from the starting point of the line at Ōbu Station.

== Station layout ==
The station has two opposed side platforms connected by a footbridge. The station has automated ticket machines, TOICA automated turnstiles and is unattended.

=== Platforms ===
1	■ Taketoyo Line	for Ōbu
2	■ Taketoyo Line	for Taketoyo

== Station history ==
Ishihama Station was opened on April 15, 1957 as a passenger station on the Japan National Railway (JNR). With the privatization and dissolution of the JNR on April 1, 1987, the station came under the control of the Central Japan Railway Company. Automatic turnstiles were installed in May 1992, and the TOICA system of magnetic fare cards was implemented in November 2006.

Station numbering was introduced to the Taketoyo Line in March 2018; Ishihama Station was assigned station number CE03.

== Passenger statistics ==
In fiscal 2017, the station was used by an average of 1221 passengers daily (boarding passengers only).

== Surrounding area ==
- Higashiura Junior High School
- Higashiura Public Library

== See also ==
- List of railway stations in Japan
