= Owari-Morioka Station =

Railway station in Higashiura, Aichi Prefecture, Japan

CE01 Owari-Morioka Station 尾張森岡駅
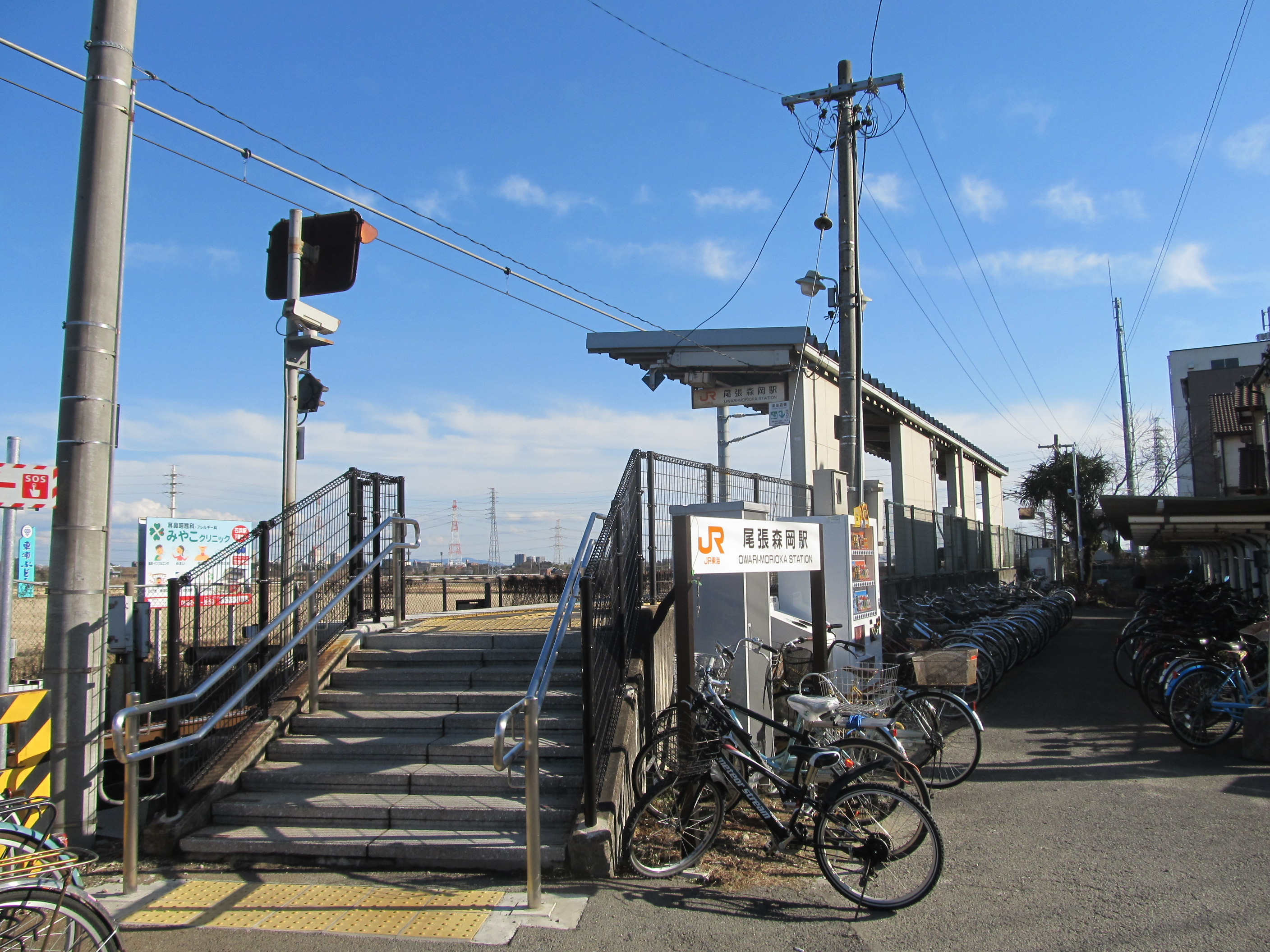
- Owari-Morioka Station in February 2018

General information
- Location: Maeda Morioka 23, Higashiura, Chita-gun, Aichi-ken 470-2101; Japan
- Coordinates: 34.9939°N 136.9704°E
- Operator: JR Central
- Line: Taketoyo Line
- Distance: 1.2 kilometers from Ōbu
- Platforms: 1 side platform
- Connections: Bus

Construction
- Structure type: at grade

Other information
- Status: Unstaffed
- Station code: CE01

History
- Opened: December 7, 1933

Passengers
- FY2021: 643 daily

Services
Preceding station	JR Central	Following station
Ōbu Terminus	Taketoyo Line Local Semi Rapid	Ogawa towards Taketoyo
Location
- Location within Aichi Prefecture Location within Japan

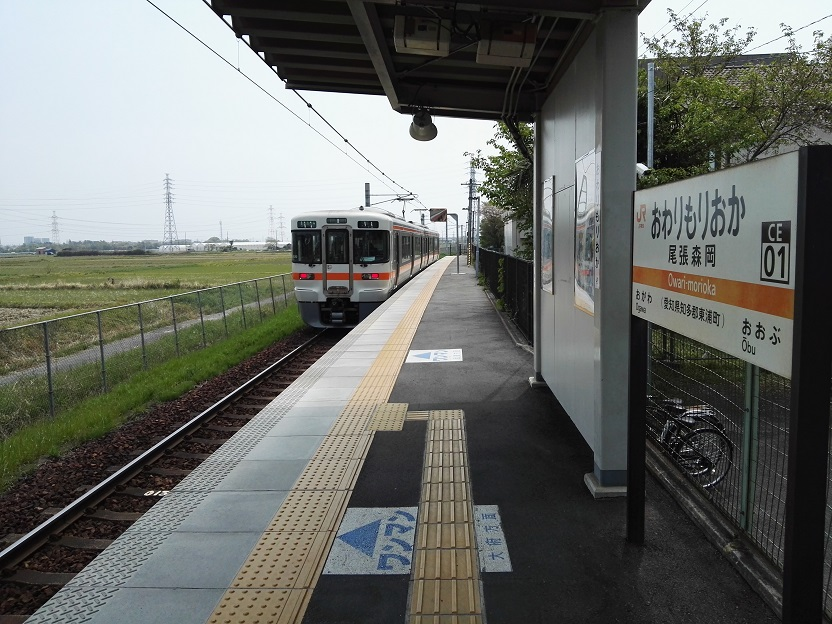
Platform

Owari-Morioka Station (尾張森岡駅, Owari-Morioka-eki) is a railway station in the town of Higashiura, Chita District, Aichi Prefecture, Japan, operated by Central Japan Railway Company (JR Tōkai).

Owari-Morioka Station is served by the Taketoyo Line, and is located 1.2 kilometers from the starting point of the line at Ōbu Station.

== Station layout ==
The station has one side platform serving a single bi-directional track. The station has automated ticket machines, TOICA automated turnstiles and is unattended. There is no station building.

== Station history ==
Owari-Morioka Station was opened on December 7, 1933 as a passenger station on the Japanese Government Railways (JGR). The station was closed on November 11, 1944 and reopened on April 15, 1957 as a station on the Japan National Railway (JNR). With the privatization and dissolution of the JNR on April 1, 1987, the station came under the control of the Central Japan Railway Company. Automatic turnstiles were installed in May 1992, and the TOICA system of magnetic fare cards was implemented in November 2006.

Station numbering was introduced to the Taketoyo Line in March 2018; Owari-Morioka Station was assigned station number CE01.

== Passenger statistics ==
In fiscal 2017, the station was used by an average of 608 passengers daily (boarding passengers only).

== Surrounding area ==
- Kaien-ji
- Owari Chita Agricultural Cooperative Morioka Office

== See also ==
- List of railway stations in Japan
