= Higashiura Station =

Railway station in Higashiura, Aichi Prefecture, Japan

CE04 Higashiura Station 東浦駅
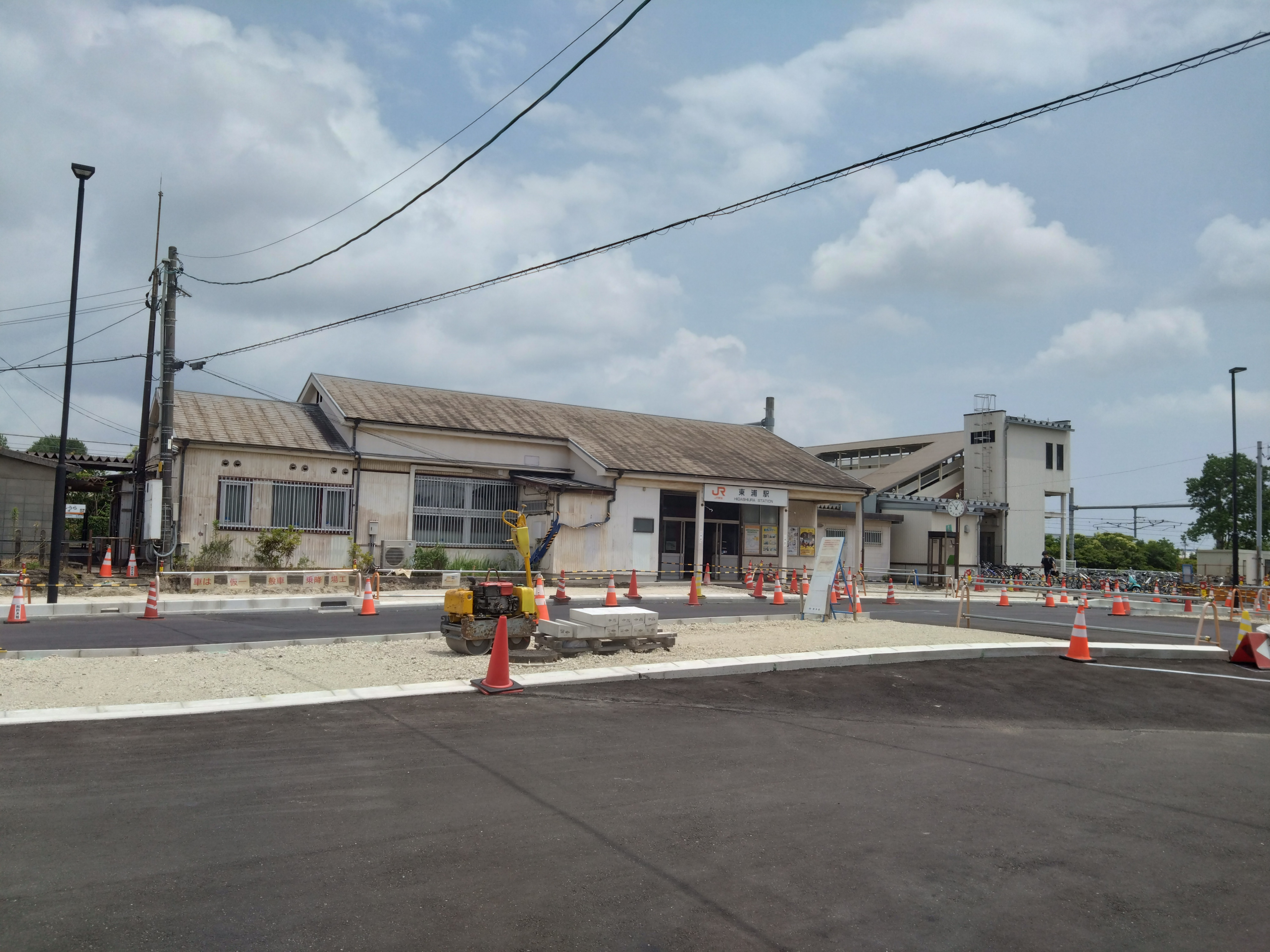
- Higashiura Station in June 2025

General information
- Location: Yagyū-19 Fujie, Higashiura, Chita-gun, Aichi-ken 470-2105; Japan
- Coordinates: 34.9499°N 136.9702°E
- Operator: JR Central; Kinuura Rinkai Railway
- Line: Taketoyo Line
- Distance: 6.8 kilometers from Ōbu
- Platforms: 2 side platforms

Other information
- Status: Unstaffed
- Station code: CE04

History
- Opened: November 11, 1944

Passengers
- FY2017: 1880 daily

Services
Preceding station	JR Central	Following station
Ishihama towards Ōbu	Taketoyo Line Local Semi Rapid	Kamezaki towards Taketoyo
Location
- Location within Aichi Prefecture Location within Japan

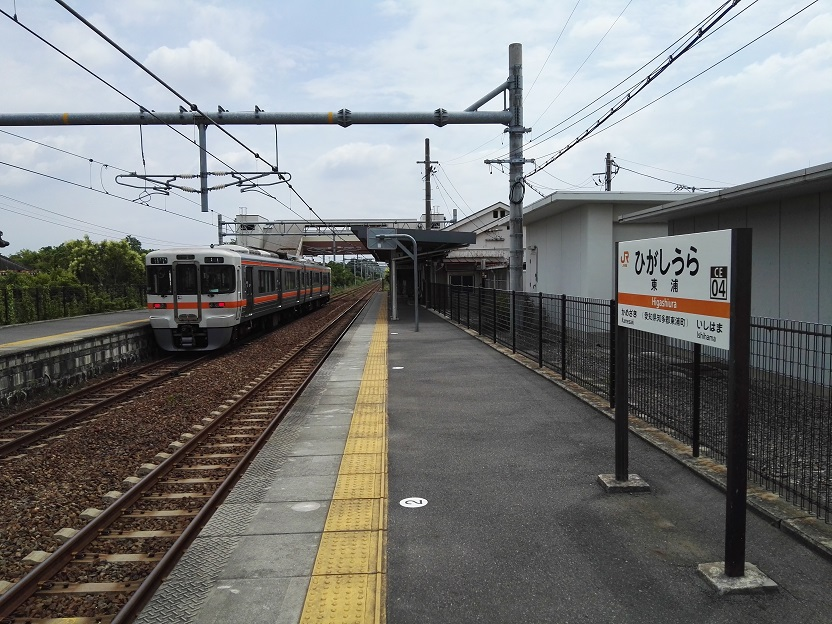
Platform

Higashiura Station (東浦駅, Higashiura-eki) is a railway station in the town of Higashiura, Chita District, Aichi Prefecture, Japan, operated by Central Japan Railway Company (JR Tōkai). It is also a freight terminal for the Kinuura Rinkai Railway.

Higashiura Station is served by the Taketoyo Line, and is located 6.8 kilometers from the starting point of the line at Ōbu Station.

== Station layout ==
The station has two opposed side platforms connected by a footbridge. The station has automated ticket machines, TOICA automated turnstiles and is unattended.

=== Platforms ===
1	■ Taketoyo Line	for Ōbu
2	■ Taketoyo Line	for Taketoyo

== History ==
Before the construction and opening of Higashiura Station, Owari-Ikuji Station (6.0 km from Obu) and Fujie Station (7.2 km from Obu) existed in North and South of the station.

Higashiura Station was opened on November 11, 1944 after the two stations were closed and deconstructed, as a passenger station on the Japanese Government Railways (JGR), which became the Japanese National Railways (JNR) after World War II. Small parcel services began in 1947, and freight services in 1948. Freight services were discontinued in January 1960; however, the Kinuura Rinkai Railway opened the Hekinan Line on May 25, 1977, which restored freight service to the station. With the privatization and dissolution of the JNR on April 1, 1987, the station came under the control of JR Central. Automatic turnstiles were installed in May 1992, and the TOICA system of magnetic fare cards was implemented in November 2006.

Station numbering was introduced to the Taketoyo Line in March 2018; Higashiura Station was assigned station number CE04.

== Passenger statistics ==
In fiscal 2017, the station was used by an average of 1880 passengers daily (boarding passengers only).

== Surrounding area ==
- Kinuura Port
- Japan National Route 366

== See also ==
- List of railway stations in Japan
