= Handa Station =

Railway station in Handa, Aichi Prefecture, Japan

CE07 Handa Station 半田駅
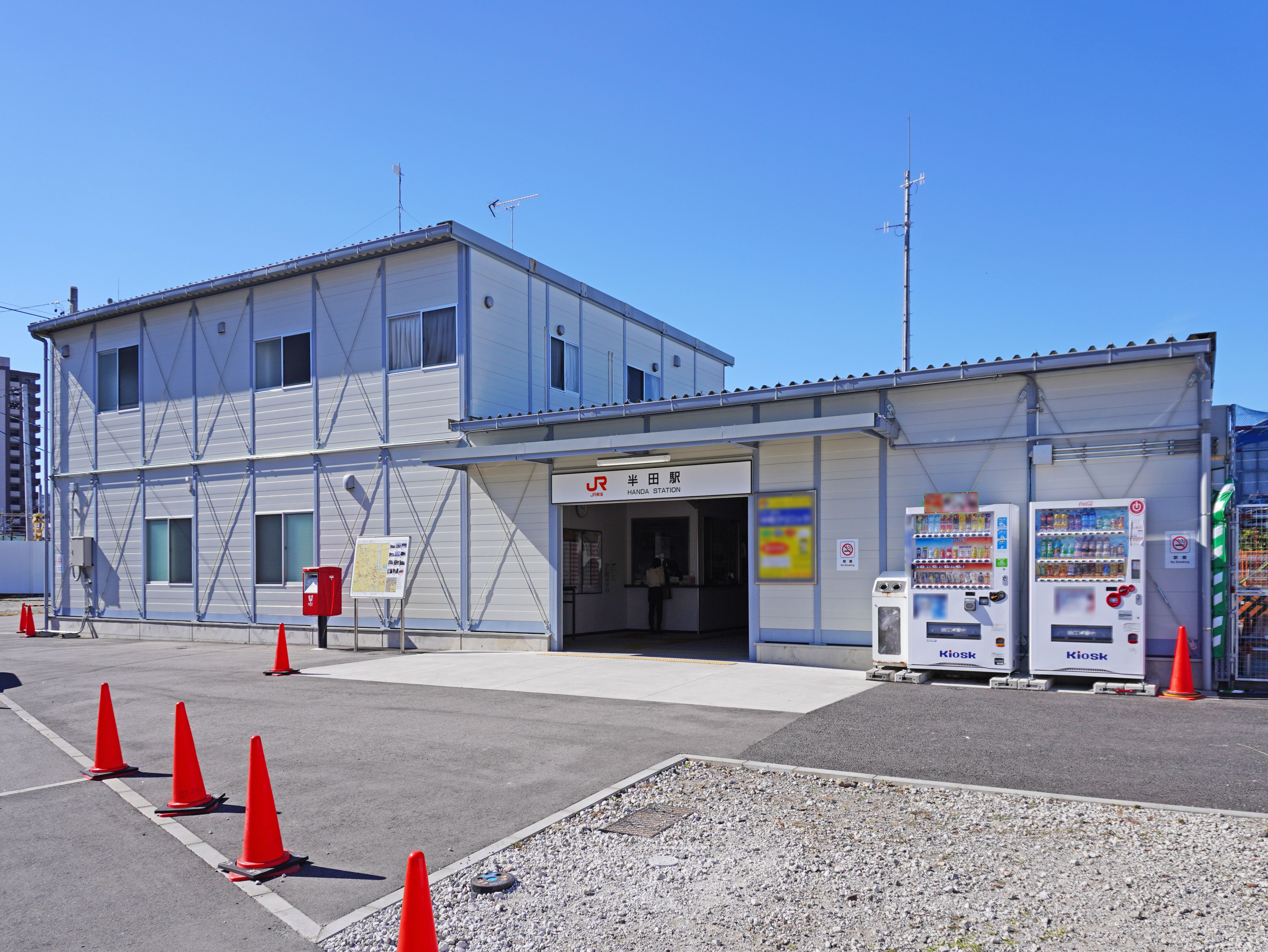
- Handa Station in November 2022

General information
- Location: 110-1 Miyuki-cho Handa-shi, Aichi-ken 475-0887; Japan
- Coordinates: 34.8947°N 136.9303°E
- Operator: JR Central
- Line: Taketoyo Line
- Distance: 14.6 kilometers from Ōbu
- Platforms: 1 island platform

Other information
- Status: Staffed
- Station code: CE07

History
- Opened: March 1, 1886

Passengers
- FY2018: 1670 daily

Services
| Preceding station | JR Central | Following station |
|---|---|---|
| Okkawa CE06 towards Ōbu | Taketoyo Line Semi Rapid Local | Higashi-Narawa CE08 towards Taketoyo |
Location
- Location within Aichi Prefecture Location within Japan

Handa Station (半田駅, Handa-eki) is a railway station in the city of Handa, Aichi Prefecture, Japan, operated by Central Japan Railway Company (JR Tōkai). Handa Station is served by the Taketoyo Line, and is located 14.6 kilometers from the starting point of the line at Ōbu Station.

== History ==
Handa Station was opened on March 1, 1886 as a passenger and freight station on the Japanese Government Railways-operated Handa Line. The station was opened as a part of a branch line connecting Atsuta Station with Taketoyo Station, and is one of the oldest stations in Aichi Prefecture. The station was relocated to the south and expanded to the current-day location in 1896. On October 12, 1909, the section of the line from Ōbu to Taketoyo was split and named as Taketoyo Line. In November 1910, an overpass connecting the platforms was completed. The station building was expanded and rebuilt in 1912.

The JGR became the Japan National Railway (JNR) after World War II. Freight operations were discontinued from November 15, 1975 and small parcel operations from February 1, 1984. With the privatization and dissolution of the JNR on April 1, 1987, the station came under the control of the Central Japan Railway Company. Automatic turnstiles were installed in May 1992, and the TOICA system of magnetic fare cards was implemented in November 2006. The Taketoyo Line was electrified in 2015 and steps were taken to construct the overhead lines such that the overpass was preserved. Station numbering was introduced to the Taketoyo Line in March 2018; Handa Station was assigned station number CE07.

== Station layout ==
The station has a single island platform connected to the station building by a footbridge. The station has automated ticket machines, TOICA automated turnstiles and is staffed.

=== Platforms ===
| 2 | ■ Taketoyo Line | for Taketoyo |
| 3 | ■ Taketoyo Line | for Ōbu |

== Passenger statistics ==
In fiscal 2018, the station was used by an average of 1670 passengers daily (boarding passengers only).

== See also ==
- List of railway stations in Japan
