= Okkawa Station =

Railway station in Handa, Aichi Prefecture, Japan

CE06 Okkawa Station 乙川駅
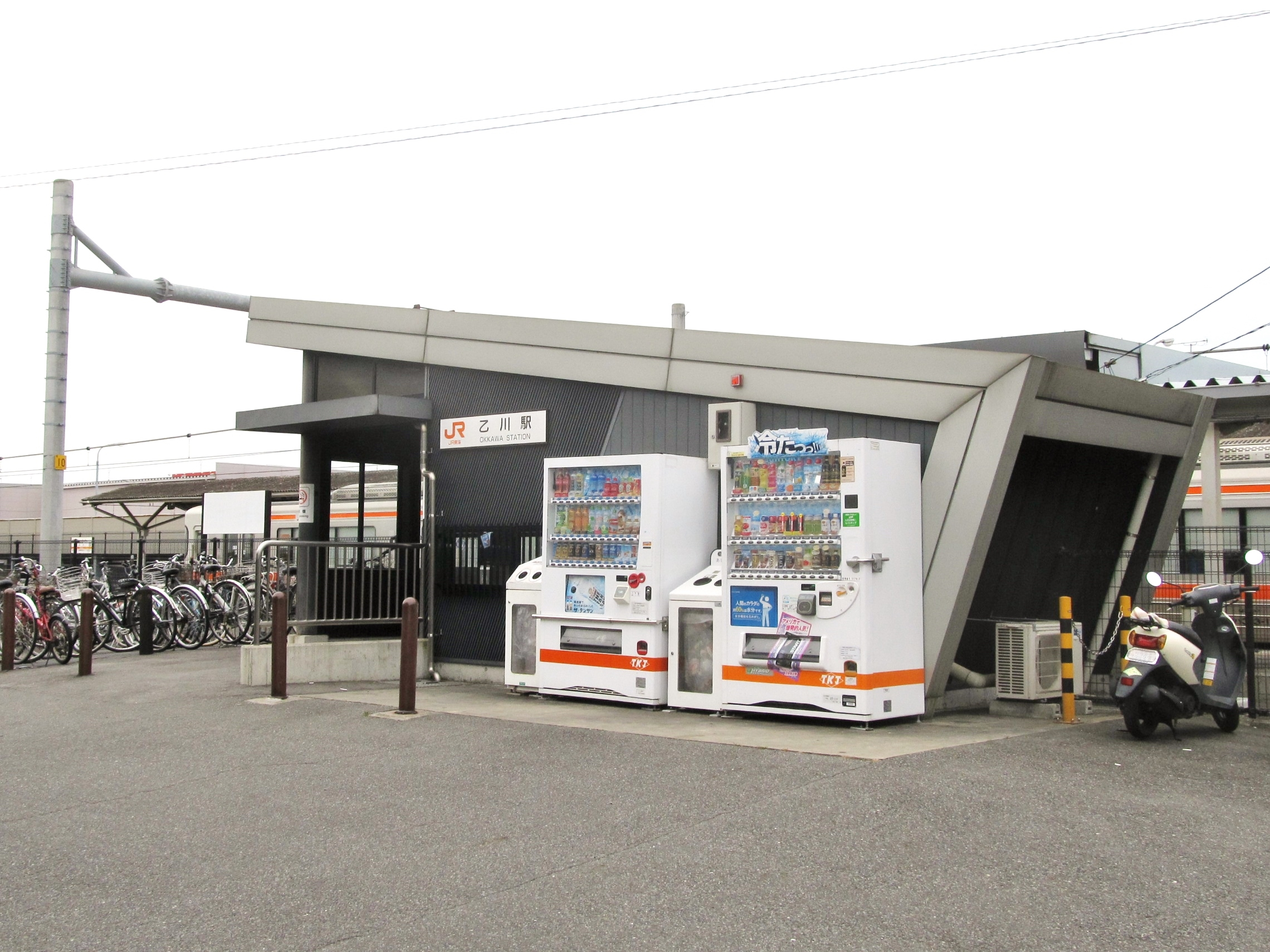
- Okkawa Station in June 2018

General information
- Location: Okkawa-cho 112-banchi, Handa-shi, Aichi-ken, 475-0054; Japan
- Coordinates: 34.9032°N 136.9415°E
- Operator: JR Central
- Line: Taketoyo Line
- Distance: 12.8 kilometers from Ōbu
- Platforms: 2 side platforms

Other information
- Status: Unstaffed
- Station code: CE06

History
- Opened: December 7, 1933

Passengers
- FY2018: 1178 daily

Services
Preceding station	JR Central	Following station
Kamezaki towards Ōbu	Taketoyo Line Local Semi Rapid	Handa towards Taketoyo
Location
- Location within Aichi Prefecture Location within Japan

Okkawa Station (乙川駅, Okkawa-eki) is a railway station in the city of Handa, Aichi Prefecture, Japan, operated by Central Japan Railway Company (JR Tōkai).

Okkawa Station is served by the Taketoyo Line, and is located 12.8 kilometers from the starting point of the line at Ōbu Station.

== Station layout ==
The station has two opposed side platforms connected to the station building by a footbridge. The station has automated ticket machines, TOICA automated turnstiles and is unattended.

=== Platforms ===
1	■ Taketoyo Line	for Ōbu
2	■ Taketoyo Line	for Taketoyo

== History ==
Okkawa Station opened on December 7, 1933, as a passenger station on the Japanese Government Railways (JGR). Freight operations commenced from April 1, 1944. The JGR became the Japanese National Railways (JNR) after World War II. Freight operations were discontinued from November 15, 1975. With the privatization and dissolution of JNR on April 1, 1987, the station came under the control of JR Central. The station building was rebuilt in March 2006. Automatic turnstiles were installed in May 1992, and the TOICA system of magnetic fare cards was implemented in November 2006.

Station numbering was introduced to the Taketoyo Line in March 2018; Okkawa Station was assigned station number CE06.

== Passenger statistics ==
In fiscal 2018, the station was used by an average of 1178 passengers daily (boarding passengers only).

== Surrounding area ==
- Okkawa Elementary School
- Okkawa Jinjal

== See also ==
- List of railway stations in Japan
