= Kamezaki Station =

Railway station in Handa, Aichi Prefecture, Japan

CE05 Kamezaki Station 亀崎駅
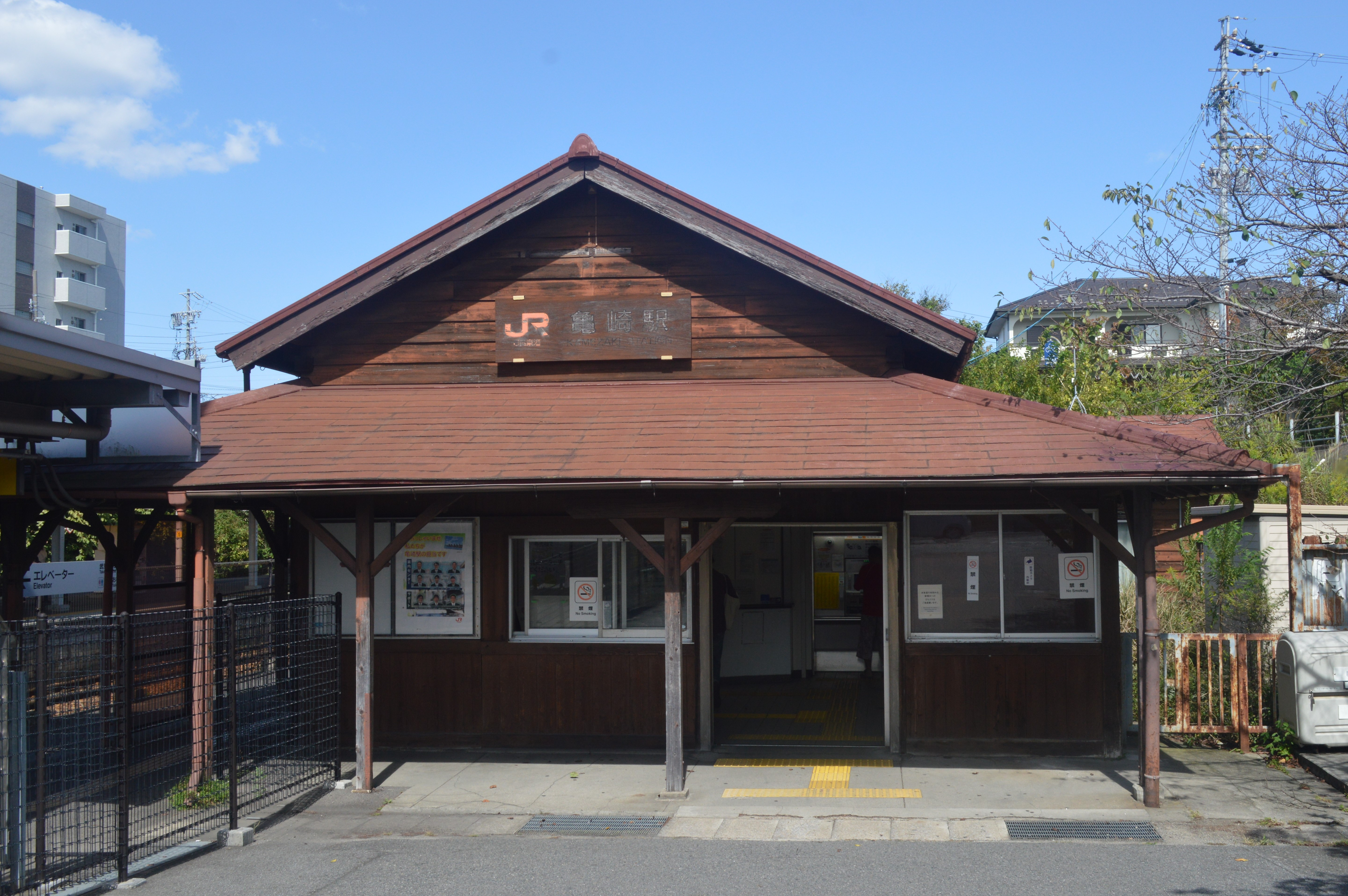
- Kamezaki Station in December 2023

General information
- Location: 2-chōme-156 Kamezaki-Tokiwachō, Handa-shi, Aichi-ken 475-0029; Japan
- Coordinates: 34.9188°N 136.9610°E
- Operator: JR Central
- Line: Taketoyo Line
- Distance: 10.2 kilometers from Ōbu
- Platforms: 1 island platform

Other information
- Status: Unstaffed
- Station code: CE05

History
- Opened: March 1, 1886

Passengers
- FY2018: 2739 daily

Services
Preceding station	JR Central	Following station
Higashiura towards Ōbu	Taketoyo Line Local Semi Rapid	Okkawa towards Taketoyo
Location
- Location within Aichi Prefecture Location within Japan

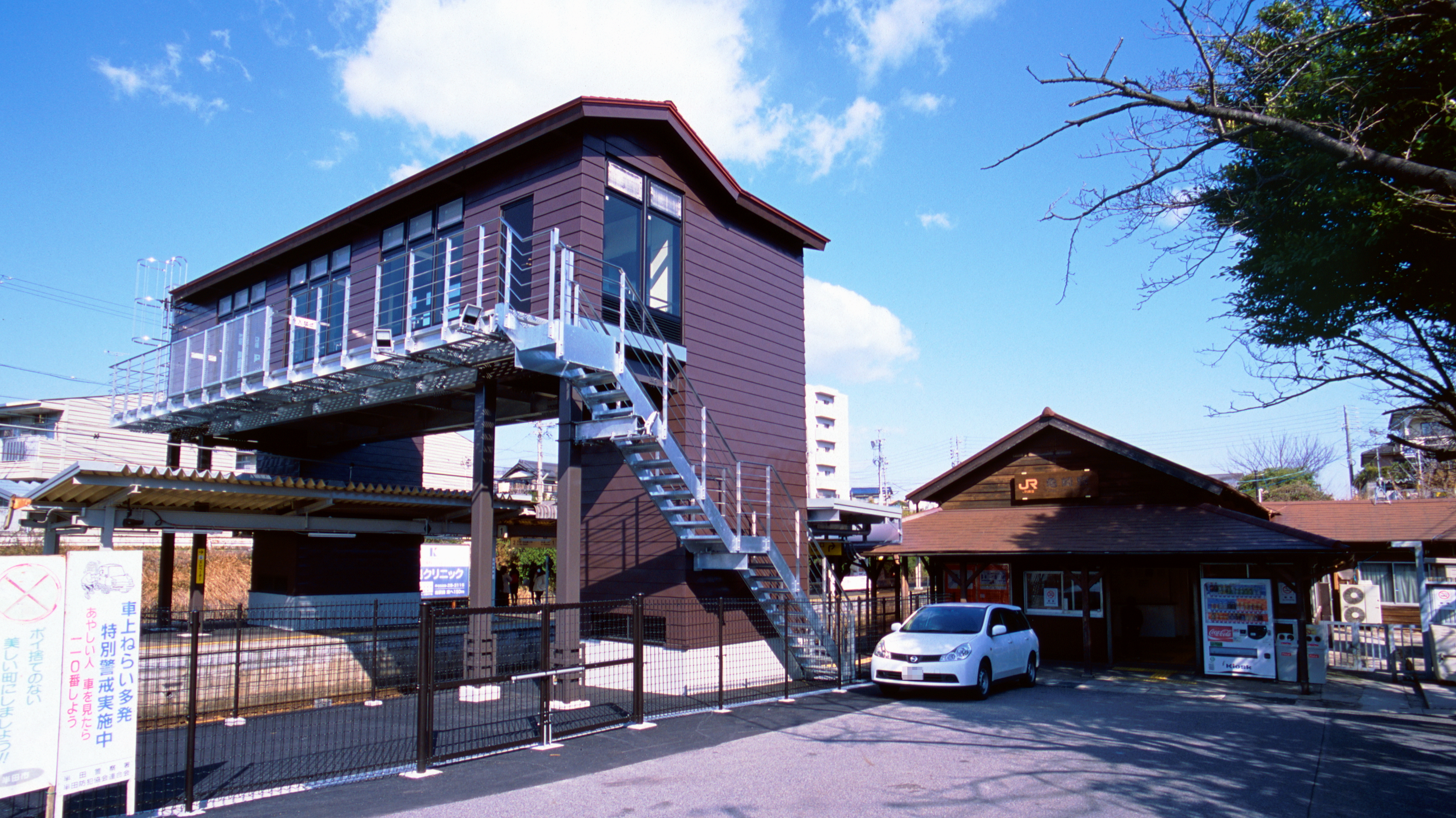
Side view

Kamezaki Station (亀崎駅, Kamezaki-eki) is a railway station on the Taketoyo Line in the city of Handa, Aichi Prefecture, Japan, operated by Central Japan Railway Company (JR Central).

The station has the oldest actively used station building in Japan.

Kamezaki Station is served by the Taketoyo Line, and is located 10.2 kilometers from the starting point of the line at Ōbu Station.

== Station layout ==
The station has two opposing side platforms connected to the station building by a footbridge. The station has automated ticket machines, TOICA automated turnstiles, and is unattended.

=== Platforms ===
1	■ Taketoyo Line	for Ōbu
2	■ Taketoyo Line	for Taketoyo

== Station history ==
Kamezaki Station was opened on March 1, 1886, as a passenger and freight station on the Japanese Government Railways (JGR). The JGR became the Japan National Railway (JNR) after World War II. Freight operations were discontinued from November 15, 1975. With the privatization and dissolution of the JNR on April 1, 1987, the station came under the control of the Central Japan Railway Company. Automatic turnstiles were installed in May 1992, and the TOICA system of magnetic fare cards was implemented in November 2006. The station building, dating from 1886 and rebuilt after a fire in 1895, is one of the oldest in Japan.

Station numbering was introduced to the Taketoyo Line in March 2018; Kamezaki Station was assigned station number CE05.

== Passenger statistics ==
In fiscal 2018, the station was used by an average of 2,739 passengers daily (boarding passengers only).

== Surrounding area ==
- Kamezaki Elementary School
- Kamezaki Junior High School

== See also ==
- List of railway stations in Japan
