= Taketoyo Line =

Railway line in Aichi prefecture, Japan

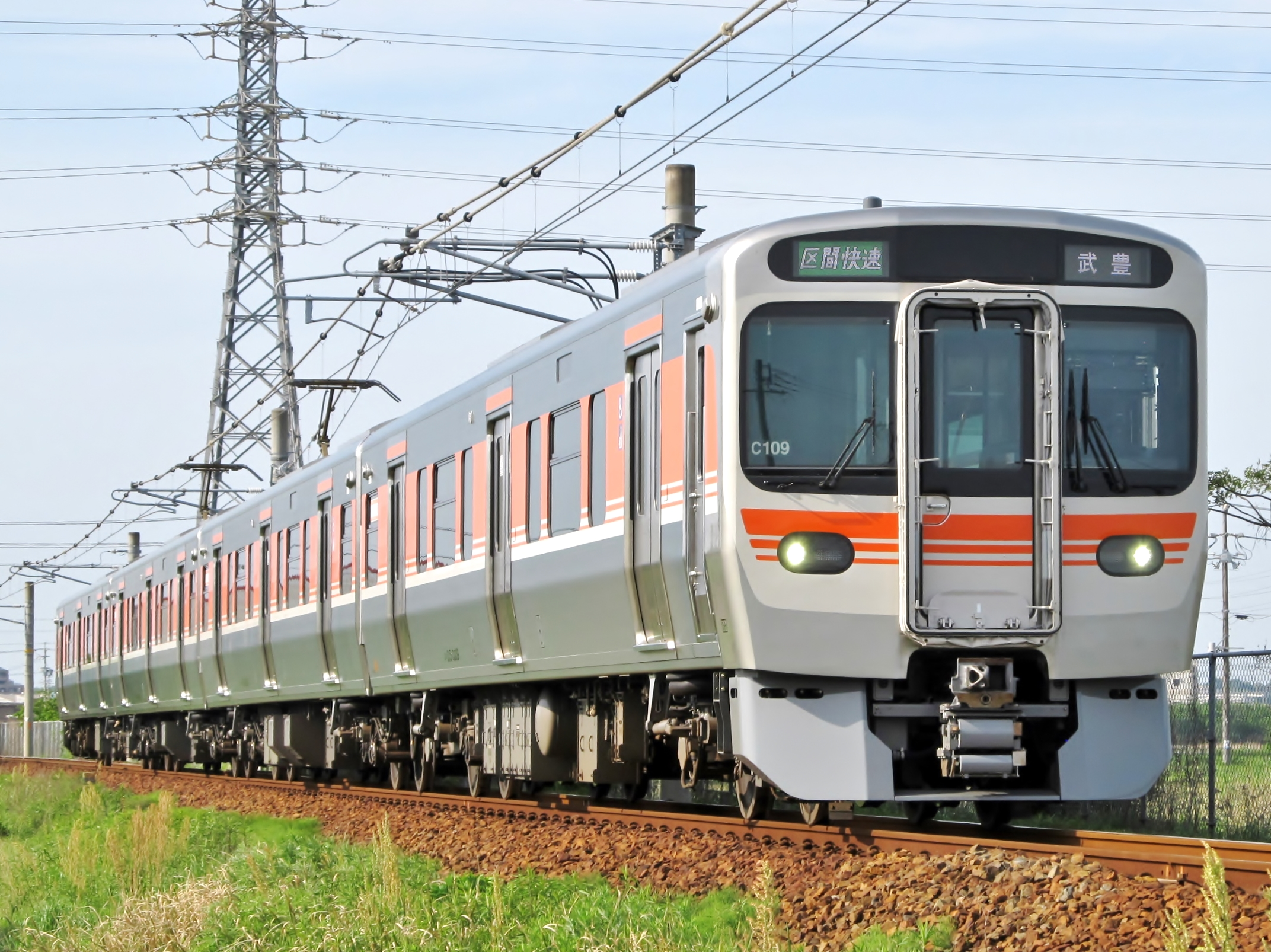
- A 315 series EMU on the Taketoyo Line in March 2024

Overview
- Native name: 武豊線
- Owner: JR Central
- Locale: Aichi Prefecture
- Termini: Ōbu; Taketoyo
- Stations: 10
- Website: Official website

Service
- Type: Regional rail
- Rolling stock: 315 series EMUs

History
- Opened: March 1, 1886; 140 years ago

Technical
- Line length: 19.3 km (12.0 mi)
- Number of tracks: Entire line single tracked
- Character: Urban
- Track gauge: 1,067 mm (3 ft 6 in)
- Electrification: 1,500 V DC, overhead catenary
- Operating speed: 85 km/h (53 mph)

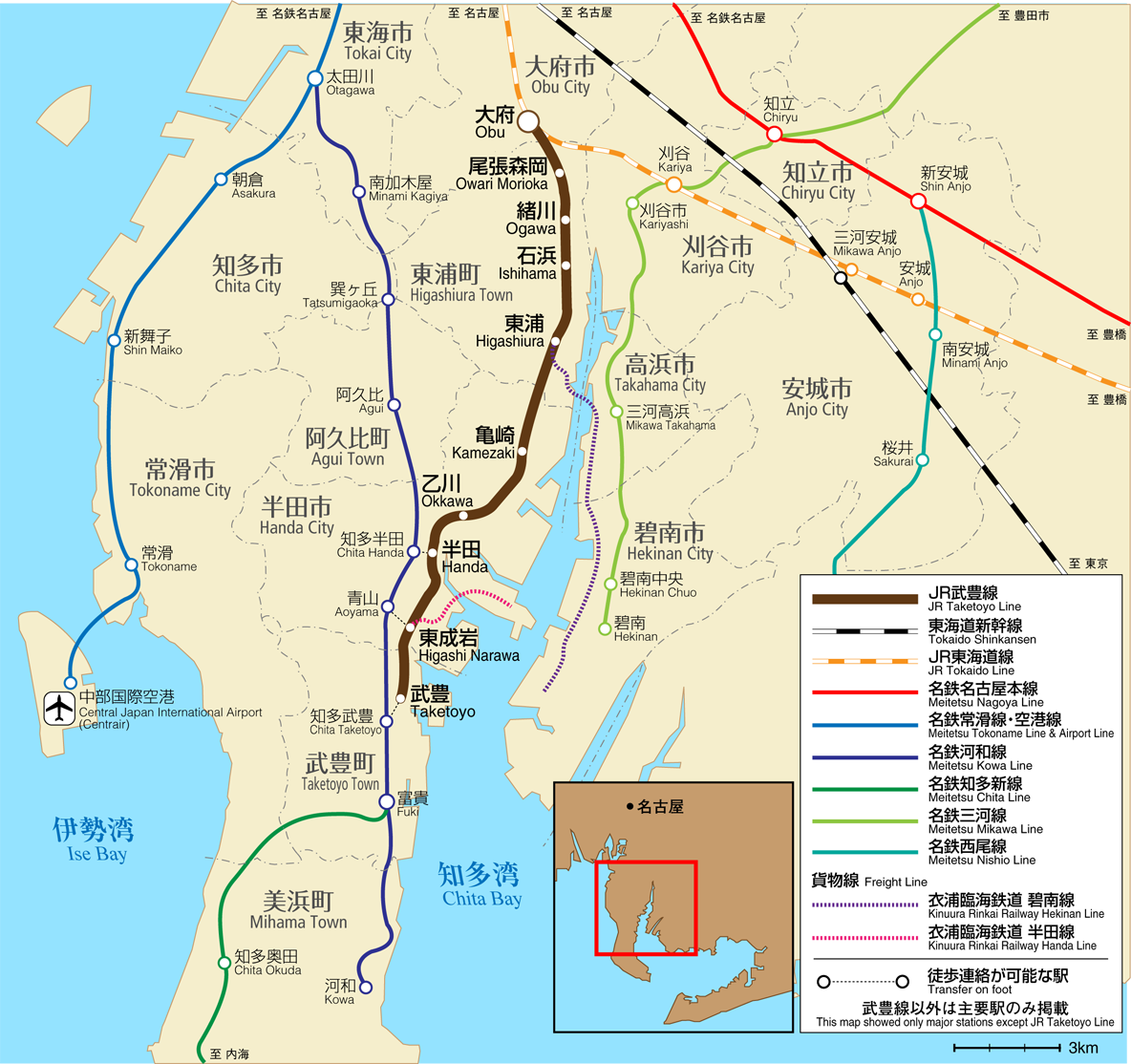
Geographically accurate route map of the line, with nearby railway lines included.

The Taketoyo Line (武豊線, Taketoyo-sen) is a Japanese railway line which connects Ōbu Station in Ōbu with Taketoyo Station in Taketoyo, both located in Aichi Prefecture. It is owned and run by the Central Japan Railway Company (JR Central). Opened in 1886, it was the first railway constructed in the prefecture.

Trains run on the line for approximately 18 hours a day (from roughly 5:30 a.m. to 11:30 p.m.) and operate with a four-car formation every 30 minutes on average. Through services to Nagoya Station via the Tōkaidō Main Line are operated every 15 minutes during peak hours.

The line initially opened as the Handa Line for the transportation of building materials for the Tokyo–Osaka railway route via Central Japan. The line was later renamed to Taketoyo Line on May 1, 1886 and began carrying passengers. The line saw a decline in passengers after the opening of the Meitetsu Kōwa Line, which ran more frequently. Due to demands from passing municipalities and local residents, the line has gone through upgrades, including electrification in 2015. JR Central introduced station numbering and line coloring in March 2018, and Taketoyo line was assigned the color brown and line code CE.

The line features the oldest actively used station building in Japan, located at Kamezaki Station. It also had the oldest overpass bridge in the country near Handa Station before it was demolished and relocated in 2021. Several stations on the line have been upgraded to be barrier-free. Services on the line use 315 series, which are electric multiple units.

== History ==
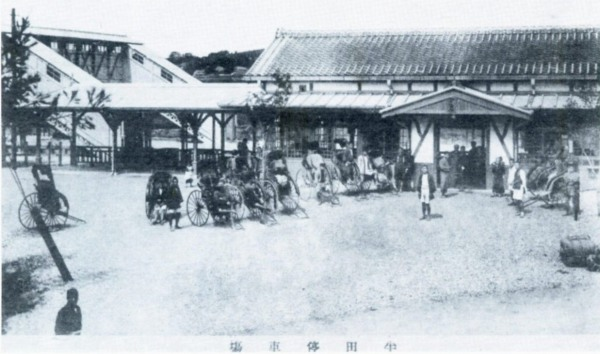
Postcard for Handa Station during the Meiji era

The Japanese government was slowly extending what is now the Tōkaidō Main Line towards central Japan from both Kōbe and Shimbashi from 1872. However, the exact route of the Osaka-Tokyo railway line in central Japan was undecided at the time, with the two options being the Tōkaidō and the Nakasendō, which were developed during the Edo period. The Imperial Japanese Army opposed the Tōkaidō route as they were closer to the coastline, which put the operation of the line at risk if it was bombarded by naval vessels. This influenced the government's decision, which chose the inland Nakasendō route. The Taketoyo Line was planned to bring construction materials for the Osaka-Tokyo railway line, and was planned to be deconstructed when the line was complete.

Before the opening of the line, one of the local workers proposed that the line also carry passengers, as the train was empty, when heading back to Taketoyo. This proposal was quickly accepted, with trains running twice a day. The entire line from Atsuta to Taketoyo station opened on March 1, 1886 as the Handa line (later renamed to Taketoyo Line on May 1) after a 7-month-long construction. It was the first railway in the prefecture. The first train to run on the line was the Locomotive No. 1 in 1885 when it was used for the construction of the Taketoyo Line. However, the proposed route was later changed due to the difficulty of the construction on July 19, and the line became a branch line when the Obu to Nagahama section of the Tokaido Main Line opened a year later, annexing the 19.5km section between Obu and Atsuta Station. In 1892, Taketoyo station was relocated 950 meters closer to Ōbu, and the former station and section reopened as the freight-only Taketoyo Minato station.

All locomotives in the line were replaced by gasoline cars in 1933. Upon the opening of Meitetsu Kōwa Line in 1932, the ridership on the line decreased as the trains on Kōwa Line ran more frequently and were quicker to reach Nagoya. Platforms of Okkawa and Higashi-Narawa stations were extended in 1941. In 1944, all services using DMUs were replaced again by locomotives due to lack of resources from World War II, and stations Fujie and Owari-Ikuji merged into Higashiura station, which was located in between the two stations, replacing both of them. Owari-Morioka station was suspended from 1944 until 1957, after being deemed unnecessary. On September 25, 1953, a typhoon hit the line and washed out the section between Taketoyo and Higashi-Narawa stations, killing a JNR worker. Locomotive services were abolished again in 1970; one-man operated services in the line started in 1992. The sections around Ogawa Station were elevated in 1995.

=== Modernization and electrification ===
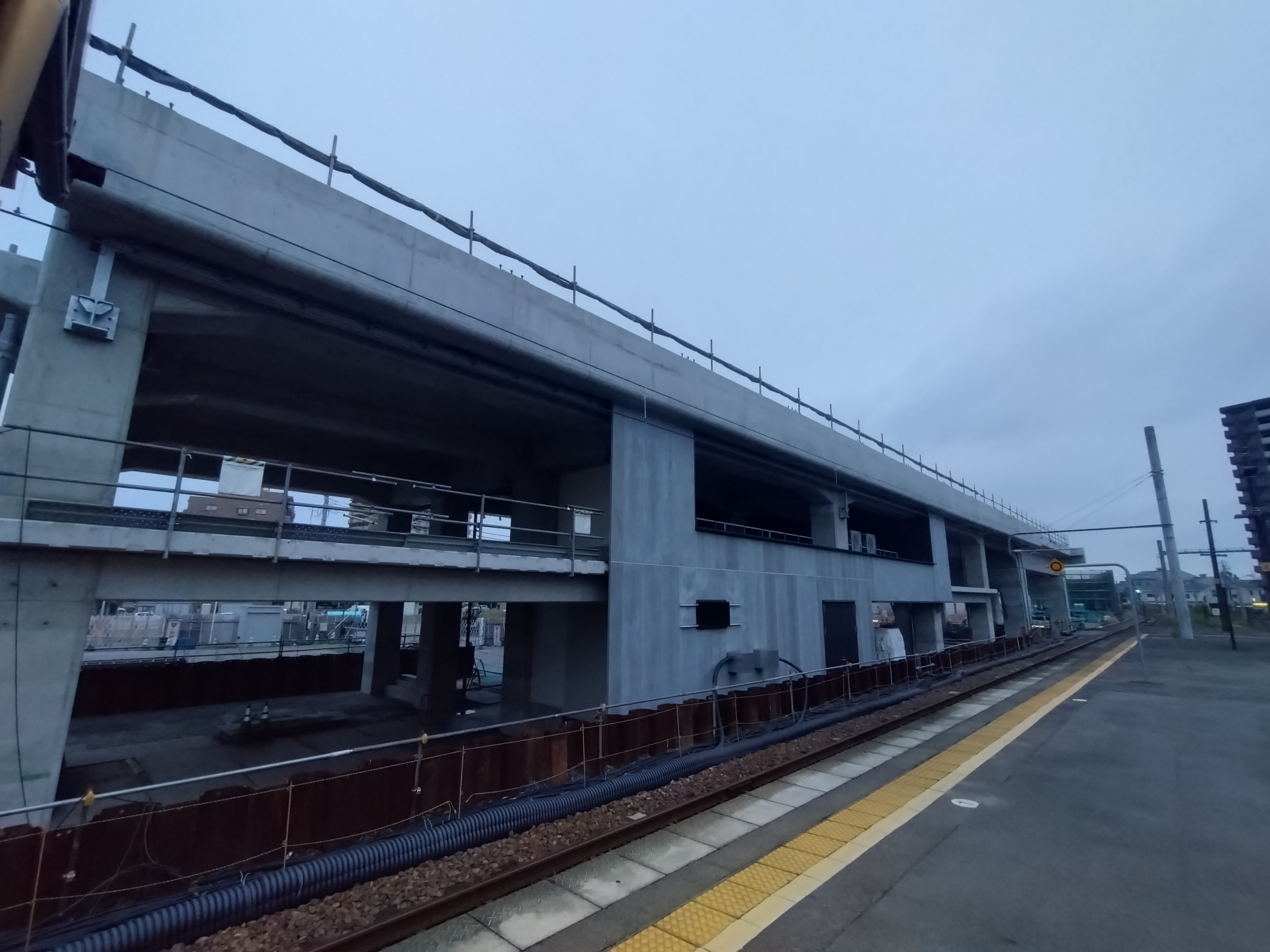
Viaducts under construction near Handa Station in 2025

Due to the line being entirely single-tracked and unelectrified despite being the closest JR-owned line to the Chubu Centrair International Airport, local residents and municipalities requested the modernization of Taketoyo Line. In response to this, JR Central began work in March 2010 to electrify the line. On 1 March 2015, the line was fully electrified, and through services to and from Nagoya commenced.

Additionally, automatic ticket gates, ticket vending machines, and a centralized station management system were installed in all stations except Owari-Morioka and Ishihama beginning in October 2013. Following this installment, JR ticket kiosks in Ogawa, Higashiura, Kamezaki, and Taketoyo Stations were closed, and the stations became unstaffed. The line introduced station numbering and line coloring in March 2018; the line was assigned the color brown and line code CE. Construction to elevate the line around Handa Station began in 2020 and is expected to finish in 2026. The 313 series were completely replaced by a fleet of 315 series, and one-man operation of the 315 series commenced with the timetable revision on 14 March 2026.

Before the construction of Chubu Centrair International Airport, the Taketoyo Line was one of three lines proposed to be connected with the airport. The proposed route would branch off from Okkawa Station and head west. This route was estimated to take around 51 minutes if a rapid service were created between Nagoya Station and the airport, far slower than the opposing Meitetsu Tokoname Line extension proposal which was also cheaper. No other development to the plan has since been reported, and the 2021 infrastructure development plan by the airport did not include this proposal.

== Network and operations ==
=== Operations ===
All train services on Taketoyo Line stop at every station, with trains running every 15–30 minutes on weekdays and 30–40 minutes on weekends. Through services by semi-rapid trains to Nagoya via Tōkaidō Main Line, stopping only at two of the seven additional stations, are available during rush hours, and local services to Gifu are available in the first and last trains. Most services are one-person operated.

Although no stations in the line handle freight operations, five freight trains operated by Kinuura Rinkai Railway pass through the line to connect to the Hekinan Line and Handa Line. Two high-speed freight trains run from Ōbu to Higashi-Narawa to Handafutō Station, and two freight trains head to Ōbu from Hekinanshi Station, with a freight train traveling from Ōbu to Hekinanshi.

Legend — Station Status

- ◼ Staffed
- ◻ Unstaffed

Legend — Stopping Patterns

- ● – All trains stop
- | – Trains pass

Station	Local	Semi-rapid	Local (to Gifu)
CA74 Gifu◼			●
CA73 Kisogawa◻			●
CA72 Owari-Ichinomiya◼			●
CA71 Inazawa◻			●
CA70 Kiyosu◻			●
CA69 Biwajima◻			●
CA68 Nagoya◼		●	●
CA67 Otōbashi◼		|	●
CA66 Kanayama◼		●	●
CA65 Atsuta◼		|	●
CA64 Kasadera◼		|	●
CA63 Ōdaka◼		|	●
CA62 Minami-Ōdaka◼		|	●
CA61 Kyōwa◼		●	●
CE00 CA60 Ōbu◼	●	●	●
CE01 Owari-Morioka◻	●	●	●
CE02 Ogawa◻	●	●	●
CE03 Ishihama◻	●	●	●
CE04 Higashiura◻	●	●	●
CE05 Kamezaki◻	●	●	●
CE06 Okkawa◻	●	●	●
CE07 Handa◼	●	●	●
CE08 Higashi-Narawa◻	●	●	●
CE09 Taketoyo◻	●	●	●

The line was operated by the Ministry of Railways since its construction until 1949, when operations of government-owned lines were transferred to the Japanese National Railways. After the privatization of JNR, the line was transferred to Central Japan Railway Company.

=== Network ===
The Taketoyo Line takes a route along National route 366 and National route 247 in the suburbs and bedtowns of northeast Chita Peninsula to its terminus in Taketoyo. For the section between Handa and Taketoyo, Meitetsu Kowa Line runs west of the line. A freight-only branch used to continue ahead to Taketoyo-Minato, although the section was closed in 1965. The entire line is single-tracked.

The line serves 10 stations (nine excluding the terminus Ōbu) across the length of the line. Most of the stations are built at grade, except for Ogawa Station, which is elevated.

No.	Name		Distance (km)	Connections	Location	
CE00; CA60	Ōbu	大府	0.0	Tōkaidō Main Line (through service)	Ōbu	Aichi
CE01	Owari-Morioka	尾張森岡	1.7		Higashiura, Chita District	Aichi
CE02	Ogawa	緒川	3.1		Higashiura, Chita District	Aichi
CE03	Ishihama	石浜	4.6		Higashiura, Chita District	Aichi
CE04	Higashiura	東浦	6.8	Kinuura Rinkai Railway Hekinan Line (freight line)	Higashiura, Chita District	Aichi
CE05	Kamezaki	亀崎	10.2		Handa	Aichi
CE06	Okkawa	乙川	12.8		Handa	Aichi
CE07	Handa	半田	14.6		Handa	Aichi
CE08	Higashi-Narawa	東成岩	16.3	Kinuura Rinkai Railway Handa Line (freight line)	Handa	Aichi
CE09	Taketoyo	武豊	19.3		Taketoyo, Chita District	Aichi

=== Infrastructure ===
==== Rolling stock ====
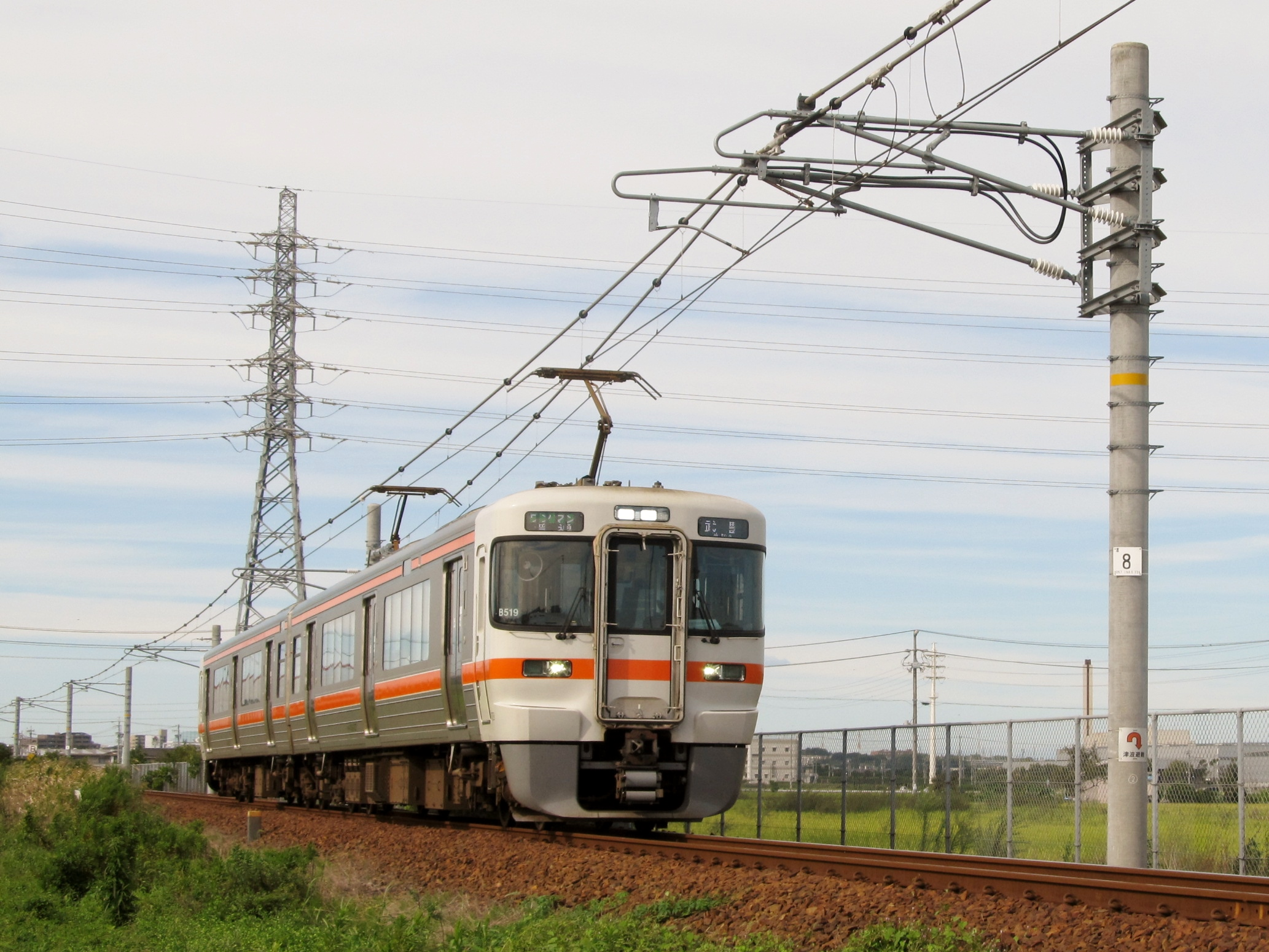
313 series EMU during its time of service on the line

Currently, the line uses electric multiple unit (EMU) trains manufactured by Nippon Sharyo after the electrification works. 315 series trains were introduced on the line on 15 March 2024, replacing 211 series trains that were in use since the electrification. 315 series trains are operated in four-car formations on all services in the line. 313 series trains were formerly used on the line in two-car formations operated by a single crew prior to its retirement.

==== Others ====
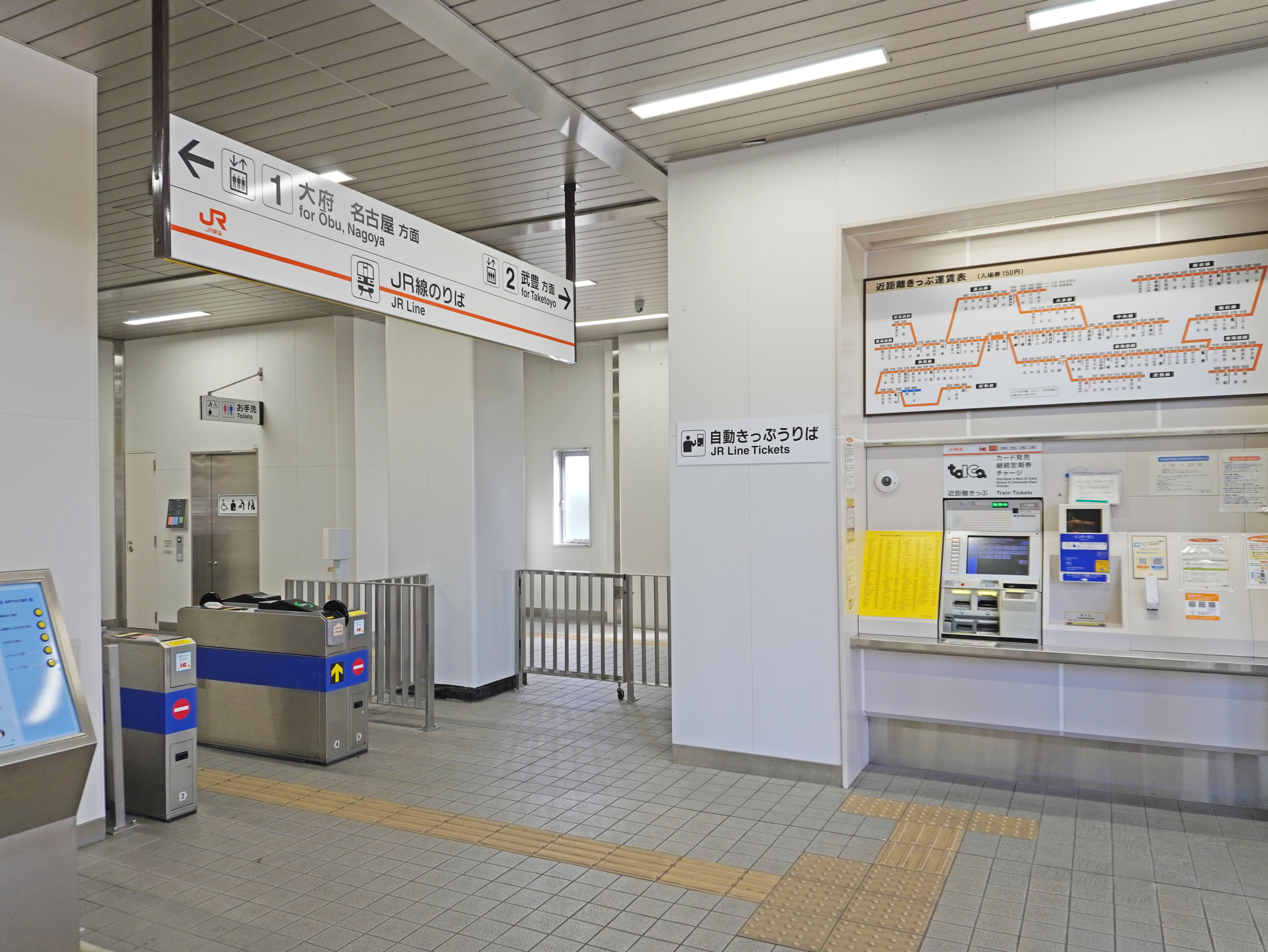
The first floor of Ogawa Station featuring ticket machines and universal design toilets

Several stations on the line have been upgraded to feature ramps, lifts, and elevators. The cost for these upgrades are funded by charging extra fares from riders. However, smaller stations, such as Owari-Morioka, Ishihama, Okkawa, and Higashi-Narawa has not been upgraded yet.

A centralized traffic control system was installed in 2001. An automatic train stopping system was installed in the line in 2011. The line had the oldest overpass bridge in Japan near Handa Station before it was demolished and relocated in 2021, to make way for the elevation works. The line also features the oldest actively used station building in Japan, located at Kamezaki Station. Ticket machines are available on all stations, with monitors installed with them.
