= Ogawa Station =

Ogawa Station is the name of three train stations in Japan:

- Ogawa Station (Kumamoto) (小川駅)
- Ogawa Station (Tokyo) (小川駅)
- Ogawa Station (Aichi) (緒川駅)
