= Higashi-Narawa Station =

Railway station in Handa, Aichi Prefecture, Japan

CE08 Higashi-Narawa Station 東成岩駅
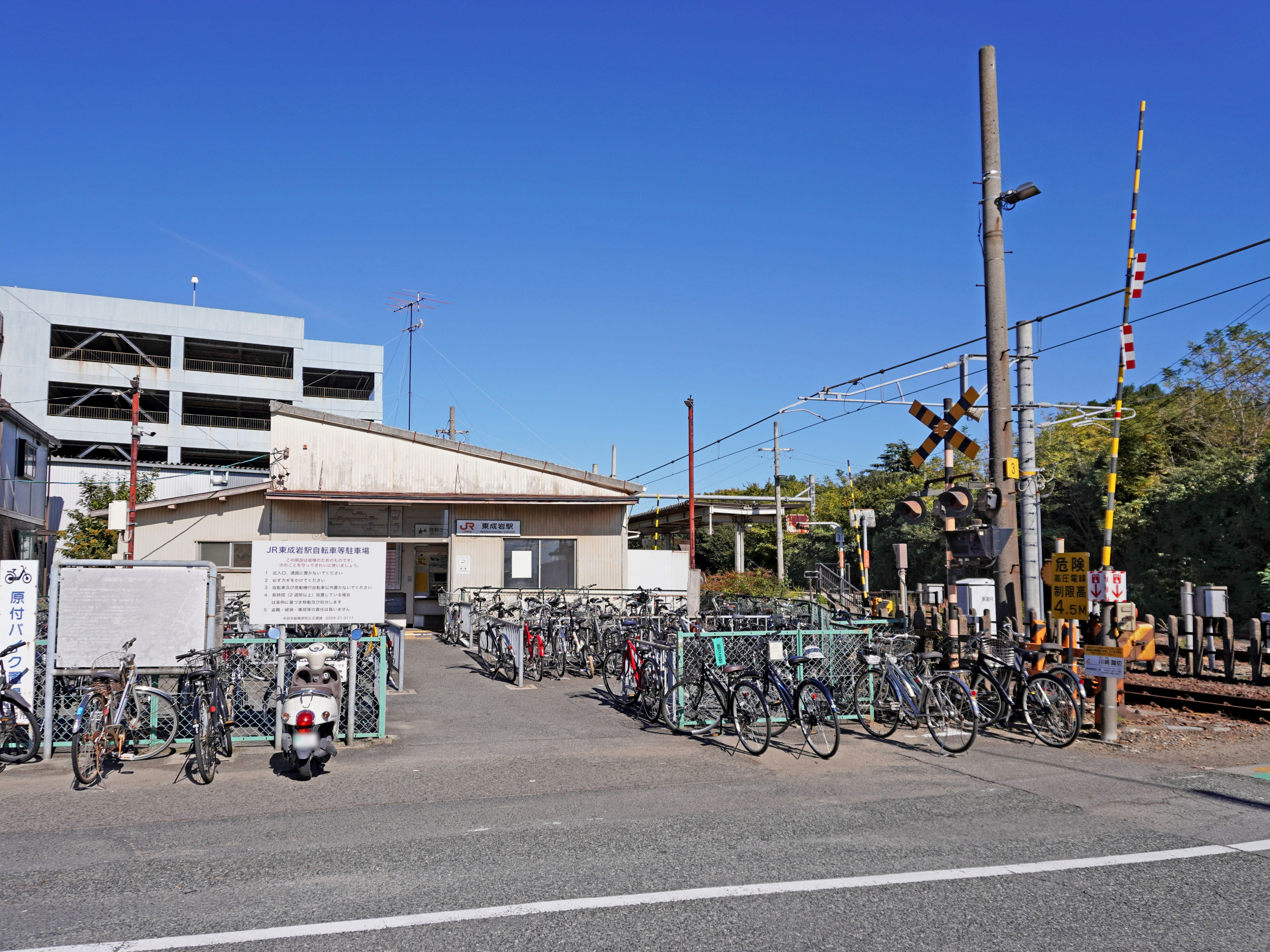
- Higashi-Narawa Station in November 2022

General information
- Location: 3-68 Asahi-cho, Handa-shi, Aichi-ken 475-0838; Japan
- Coordinates: 34.8736°N 136.9229°E
- Operator: JR Central; Kinuura Rinkai Railway
- Line: Taketoyo Line
- Distance: 16.3 kilometers from Ōbu
- Platforms: 1 island platform

Other information
- Status: Unstaffed
- Station code: CE08

History
- Opened: March 1, 1933

Passengers
- FY2018: 615 daily

Services
Preceding station	JR Central	Following station
Handa towards Ōbu	Taketoyo Line Local Semi Rapid	Taketoyo Terminus
Location
- Location within Aichi Prefecture Location within Japan

Higashi-Narawa Station (東成岩駅, Higashi-Narawa-eki) is a railway station in the city of Handa, Aichi Prefecture, Japan, operated by Central Japan Railway Company (JR Tōkai). It is also a freight terminal for the Kinuura Rinkai Railway.

Higashi-Narawa Station is served by the Taketoyo Line, and is located 16.3 kilometers from the starting point of the line at Ōbu Station.

== Station layout ==
The station has a single island platforms connected to the station building by a level crossing. The station has automated ticket machines, TOICA automated turnstiles and is unattended.

=== Platforms ===
1	■ Taketoyo Line	for Ōbu
2	■ Taketoyo Line	for Taketoyo

== History ==
Higashi-Narawa Station opened on 1 March 1933, as a passenger station on the Japanese Government Railways (JGR). Freight operations commenced from 1 May 1945. The JGR became the Japanese National Railways (JNR) after World War II. Freight operations were discontinued from 15 November 1975, and the station became unattended after that time. With the privatization and dissolution of the JNR on 1 April 1987, the station came under the control of JR Central. Automatic turnstiles were installed in May 1992, and the TOICA system of magnetic fare cards was implemented in November 2006.

The freight-only Kinuura Rinkai Railway Handa Line opened on 15 November 1975.

Station numbering was introduced to the Taketoyo Line in March 2018; Higashi-Narawa Station was assigned station number CE08.

== Passenger statistics ==
In fiscal 2018, the station was used by an average of 615 passengers daily (boarding passengers only).

== Surrounding area ==
- JFE Steel - Chita plant

== See also ==
- List of railway stations in Japan
