= Kinuura Rinkai Railway Handa Line =

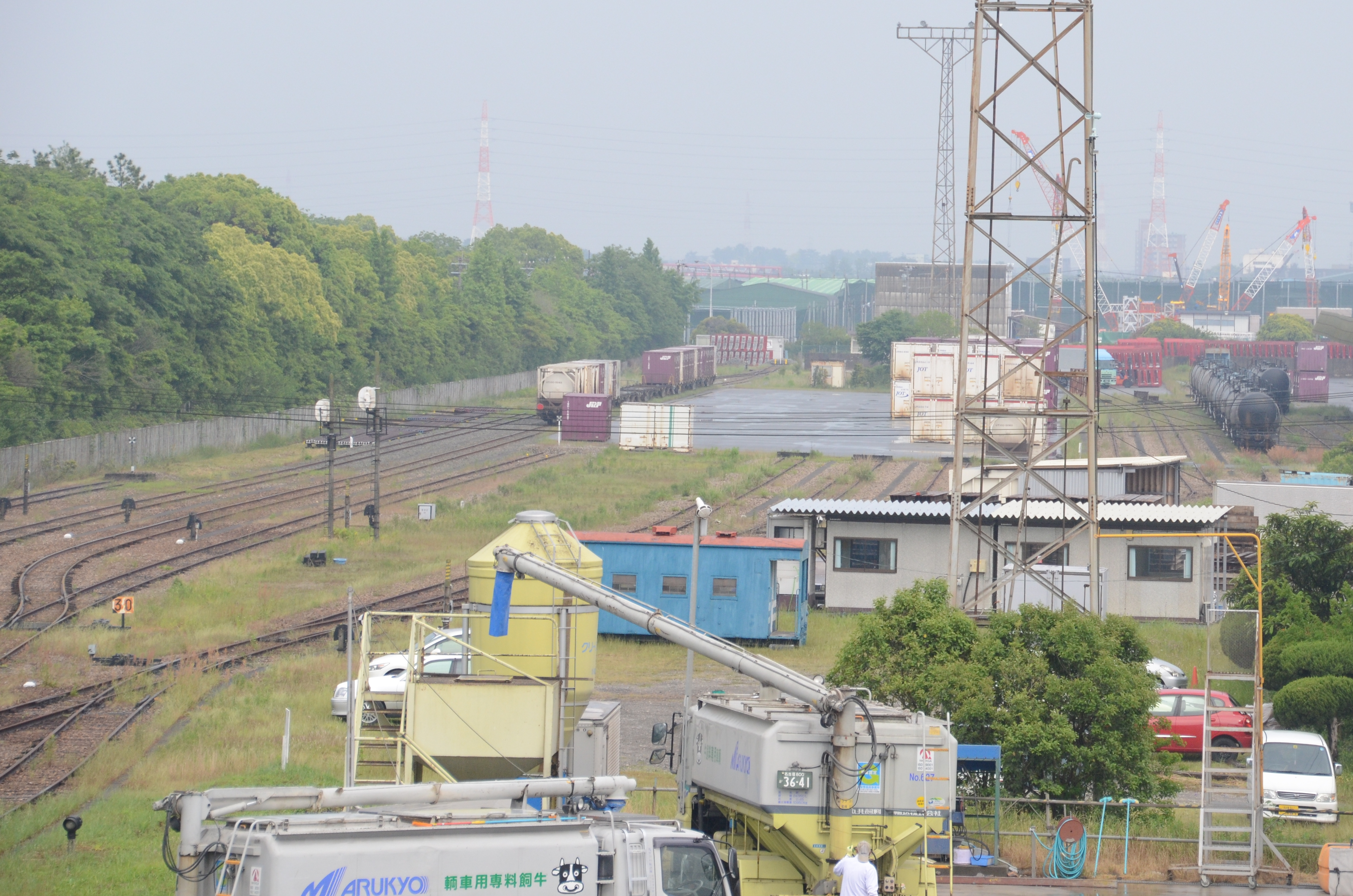
- Handa-Futō terminal, May 2012

Overview
- Status: Operational
- Owner: Kinuura Rinkai Railway
- Locale: Aichi Prefecture, Japan
- Termini: Higashi-Narawa; Handa-Futō

History
- Opened: November 15, 1975

Technical
- Line length: 3.4 miles (5.5 km)
- Track gauge: 1,067 mm (3 ft 6 in)
- Minimum radius: 200 m
- Electrification: Not electrified
- Operating speed: 45 km/h (30 mph)

The Kinuura Rinkai Railway Handa Line (衣浦臨海鉄道半田線, Kinuura Rinkai Tetsudō Handa-sen) is a freight-only railway line owned and operated by the Kinuura Rinkai Railway in Handa, Aichi, Japan, since 1975. The line extends 3.4 km (2.1 mi) from Higashi-Narawa Station (on the JR Central Taketoyo Line) to the terminal at Handa-Futō ("Handa Wharf").

== Operations ==
Freight services over the Kinuura Rinkai Railway tracks are hauled by Class KE65 diesel locomotives. As of 2013, traffic on the line consisted of one return container service daily.

== History ==
The line opened on 15 November 1975.

== See also ==
- Kinuura Rinkai Railway Hekinan Line, the other line operated by the Kinuura Rinkai Railway
- List of railway lines in Japan
