= Kinuura Rinkai Railway =

Freight-only railway company in Aichi Prefecture, Japan, operating since 1971

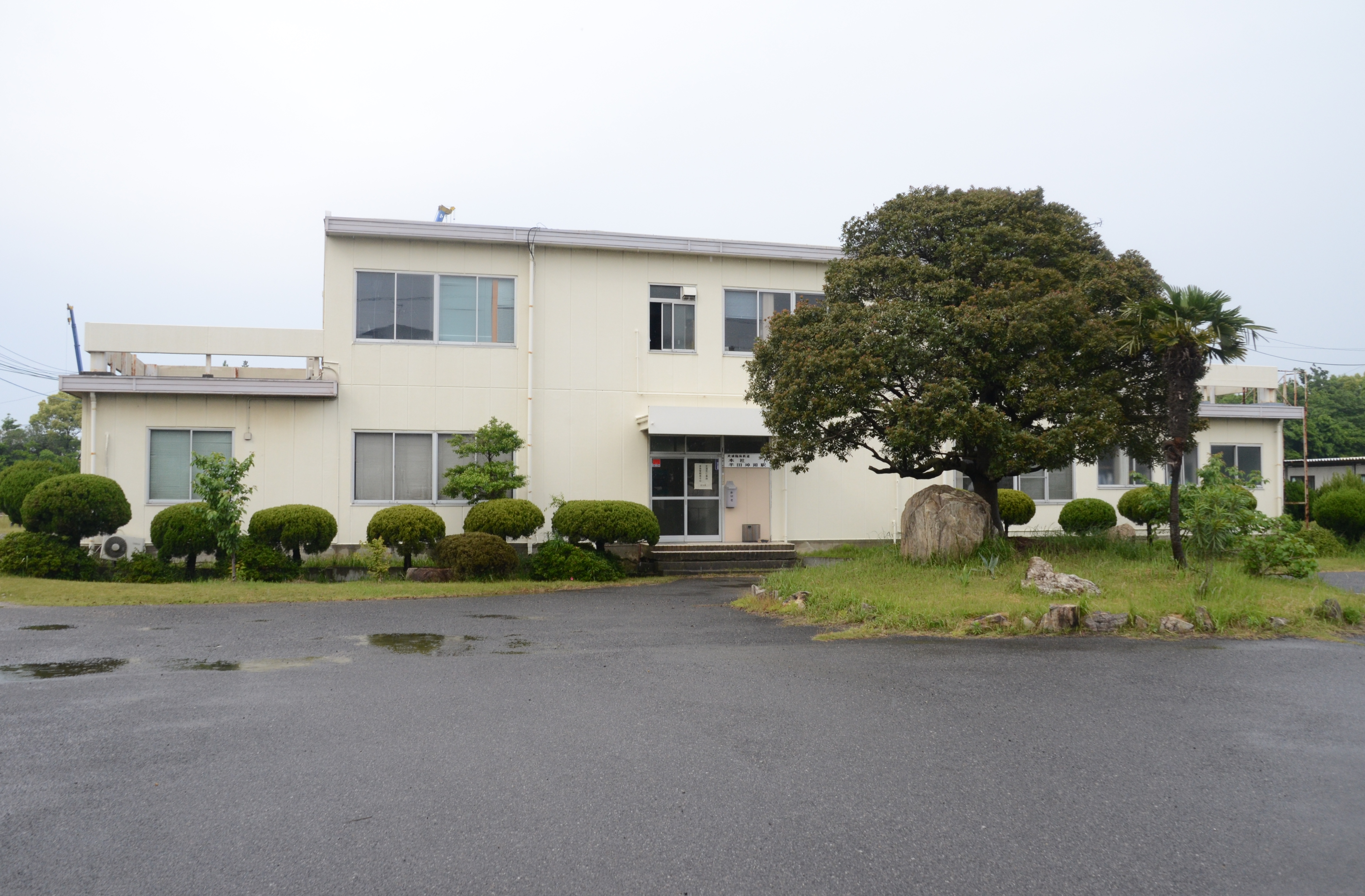
The administration building at the Handa-Futo terminal and depot, May 2012

The Kinuura Rinkai Railway (衣浦臨海鉄道, Kinuura Rinkai Tetsudō, "Kinuura Seaside Railway") is a freight-only railway company in Aichi Prefecture, Japan, operating since 1971. The two lines operated by the company lines serve the industrial area of the Port of Kinuura, Mikawa Bay. They mainly transport cement, fly ash, and calcium carbonate.

== Lines ==
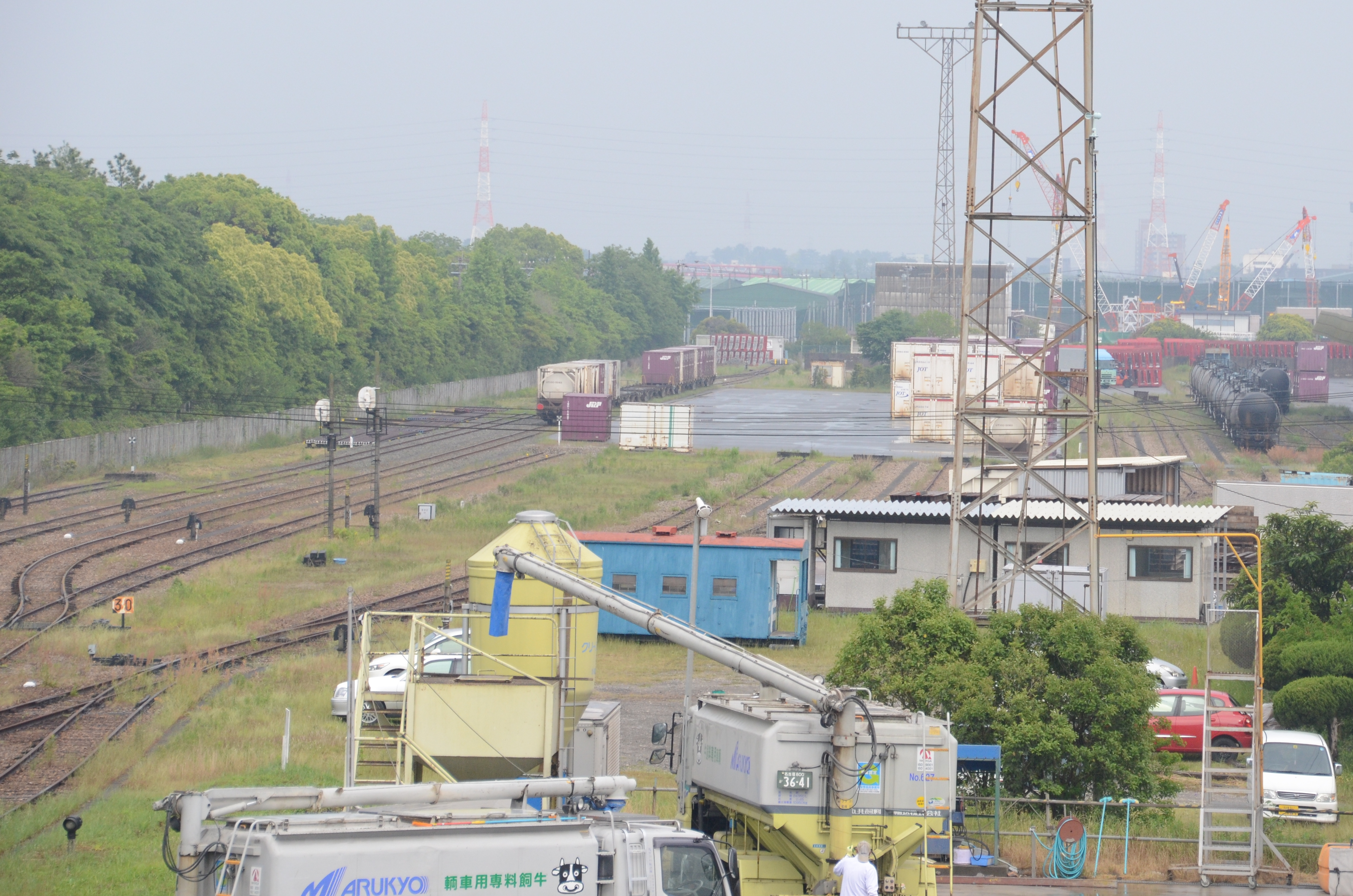
Handa-Futo terminal, May 2012

The Kinuura Rinkai Railway operates two unconnected lines: the 3.4 km (2.1 mi) Handa Line from Higashi-Narawa (on the JR Central Taketoyo Line) to Handa-Futō, and the 8.2 km (5.1 mi) Hekinan Line from Higashiura (also on the Taketoyo Line) to Hekinanshi. Both lines are 1,067 mm (3 ft 6 in) gauge and non-electrified.

== Rolling stock ==
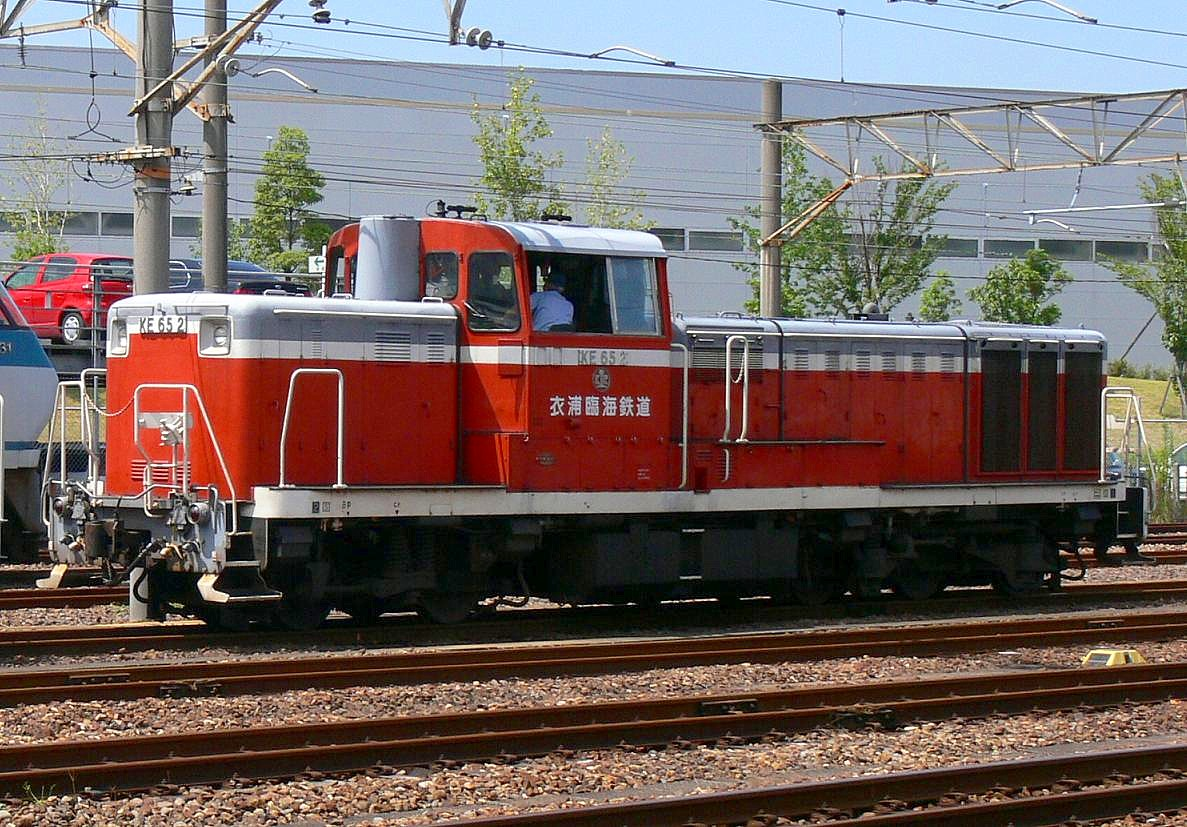
Kinuura Rinkai Railway Class KE65 diesel locomotive KE65 2

As of 1 April 2014, the company operates a fleet four 1,350 hp Class KE65 diesel locomotives (numbered KE65 1 to 3 and 5), based at Handa-Futō Depot. Locomotive number KE65 2 has been stored out of use since September 2011. The locomotives receive major overhauls at JR facilities such as Omiya and Hiroshima Works.

== History ==
The Kinuura Rinkai Railway was established on 8 April 1971. The Handa Line opened on 15 November 1975, and the Hekinan Line opened on 25 May 1977, from Higashiura to Gongenzaki. The section of the line from Hekinan to Gongenzaki was closed as of 1 April 2006.

== See also ==
- List of railway companies in Japan
- Transport in Greater Nagoya
