= Taketoyo =

Taketoyo 武豊町
- Town
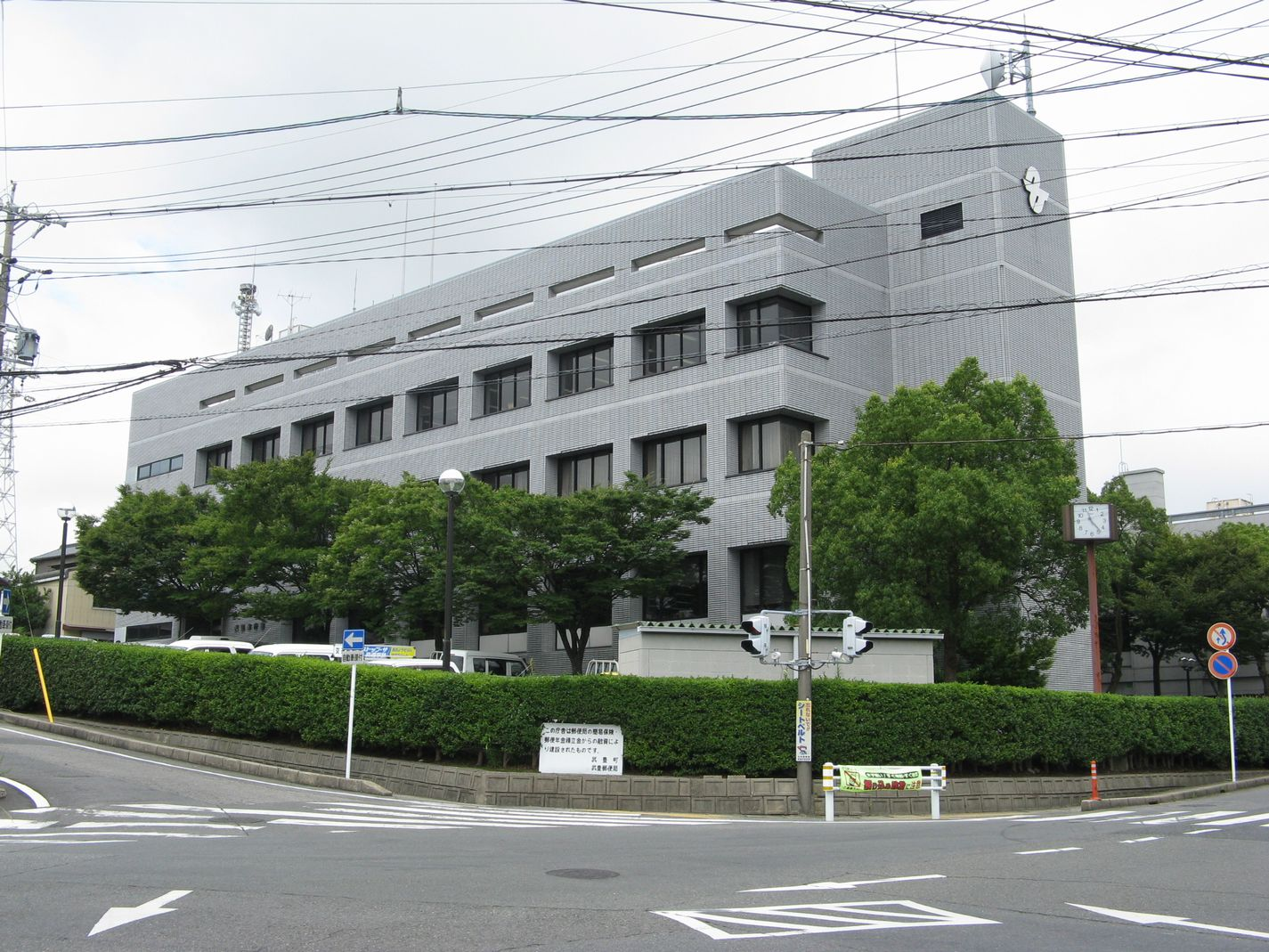
- Taketoyo Town Office

- Flag Emblem

- Location of Taketoyo in Aichi Prefecture

- Coordinates: 34°51′3.8″N 136°54′53″E
- Country: Japan
- Region: Chūbu region Tōkai region
- Prefecture: Aichi
- District: Chita

Area
  - Total: 26.38 km^{2} (10.19 sq mi)

Population (October 1, 2019)
  - Total: 43,147
  - Density: 1,636/km^{2} (4,236/sq mi)
- Time zone: UTC+9 (Japan Standard Time)
- Tree: Cinnamomum camphora
- Flower: Camellia sasanqua
- Phone number: 0569-72-1111
- Address: 2 Nagaoyama, Taketoyo-chō, Chita-gun, Aichi-ken 470-2406
- Website: Official website

Taketoyo (武豊町, Taketoyo-chō) is a town located in Chita District, Aichi Prefecture, Japan. As of 1 October 2019, the town had an estimated population of 43,147 in 18,392 households, and a population density of 1,636 persons per km^{2}. The total area of the town was 26.38 square kilometres (10.19 sq mi).

== Geography ==
Taketoyo is located in the northeast corner of Chita Peninsula in southern Aichi Prefecture, bordered by Mikawa Bay to the east. Part of the town's area is within the borders of the Mikawa Wan Quasi-National Park.

=== Neighboring municipalities ===
- Aichi Prefecture
  - Handa
  - Hekinan
  - Mihama
  - Tokoname

== Demographics ==
Per Japanese census data, the population of Taketoyo has been increasing over the past 70 years.

Historical population
Year	Pop.	±%
1940	10,790	—
1950	15,504	+43.7%
1960	17,103	+10.3%
1970	25,575	+49.5%
1980	33,924	+32.6%
1990	38,105	+12.3%
2000	39,993	+5.0%
2010	42,416	+6.1%

=== Climate ===
The town has a climate characterized by characterized by hot and humid summers, and relatively mild winters (Köppen climate classification Cfa). The average annual temperature in Taketoyo is 15.5 °C. The average annual rainfall is 1672 mm with September as the wettest month. The temperatures are highest on average in August, at around 27.5 °C, and lowest in January, at around 4.6 °C.

== History ==
The village of Taketoyo was established within Chita District, Aichi by the early Meiji period establishment of the modern municipalities system on October 1, 1889. Taketoyo was raised to town status on February 15, 1891.

An Imperial decree in July 1899 established Taketoyo as an open port for trading with the United States and the United Kingdom.

On October 5, 1954, Taketoyo annexed the neighboring village of Fuki, also from Chita District.

== Economy ==
Due to its location near the Greater Nagoya metropolis and the port facilities at the Port of Kinuura, Taketoyo is home to numerous factories, including glass manufacturing, and pharmaceuticals. Chubu Electric Power also has a large electrical generating facility, the Taketoyo Thermal Power Station, which provides substantial employment and tax revenues. The traditional industries in the town center around the production of soy sauce, miso and cotton products.

== Education ==
- Taketoyo has four public elementary schools and two public junior high schools operated by the town government and one public high school operated by the Aichi Prefectural Board of Education.
  - Escola Expressão - Brazilian primary school

== Transportation ==
=== Railway ===
Central Japan Railway Company - Taketoyo Line

- Taketoyo

Meitetsu – Kōwa Line

- Age - Chita-Taketoyo - Fuki

Meitetsu – Chita New Line

- Fuki

=== Highway ===
- National Route 247

== Notable people from Taketoyo ==
- Shōko Ieda, author
