= Atsuta Station =

Railway station in Nagoya, Japan

CA65 Atsuta Station 熱田駅
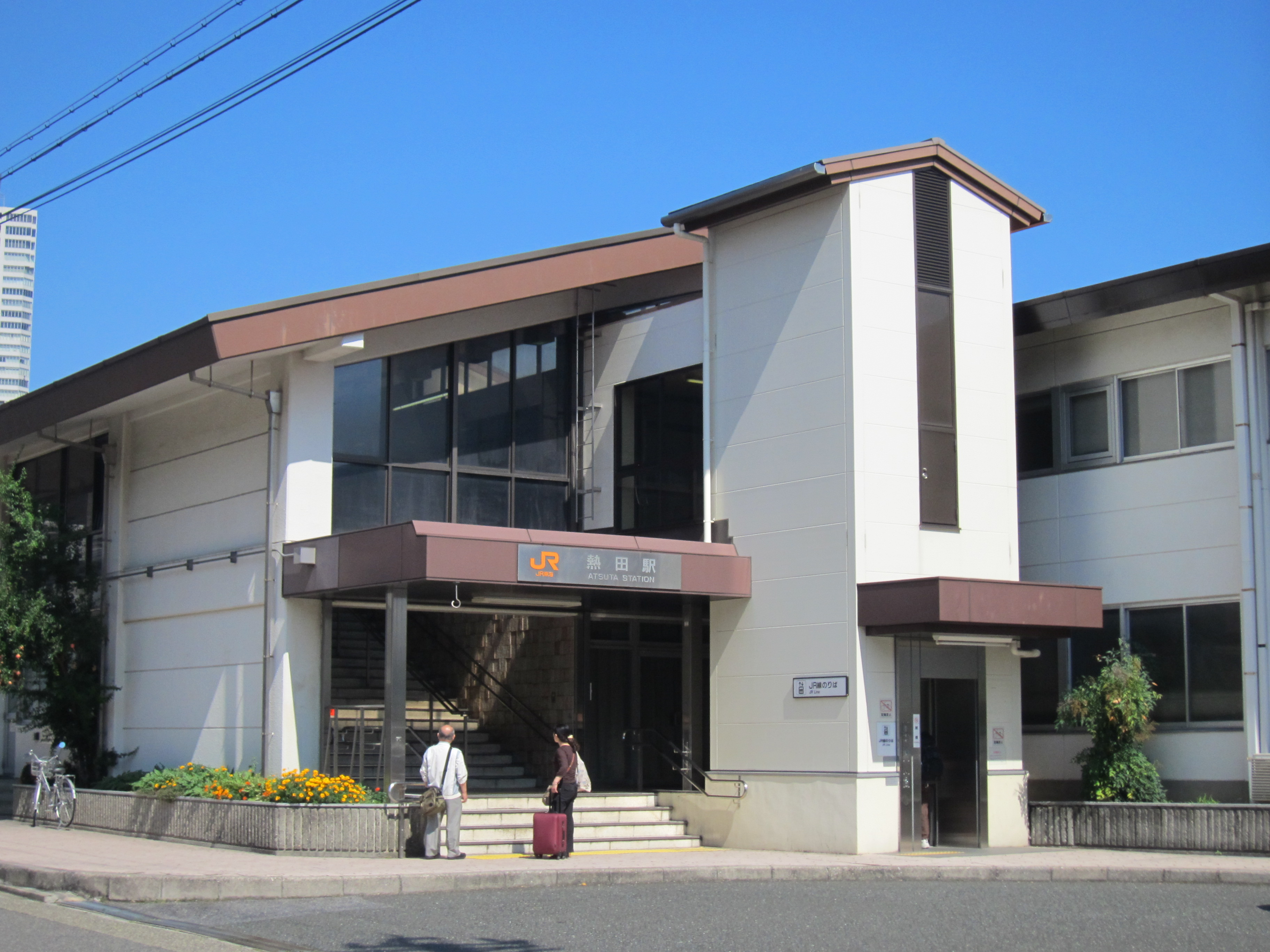
- Atsuta Station in October 2012

General information
- Location: 2-502 Morigochō, Atsuta-ku, Nagoya-shi, Aichi-ken 456-0024; Japan
- Coordinates: 35.1303°N 136.9104°E
- Operator: JR Central
- Line: Tokaido Main Line
- Distance: 360.8 kilometers from Tokyo
- Platforms: 2 island platforms

Other information
- Status: Staffed
- Station code: CA65
- Website: Official website

History
- Opened: March 1, 1886

Passengers
- 2023–2024: 6,095 daily

Services
Preceding station	JR Central	Following station
Kanayama towards Maibara	Tōkaidō Main Line Local	Kasadera towards Atami
Location
- Location within Aichi Prefecture Location within Japan

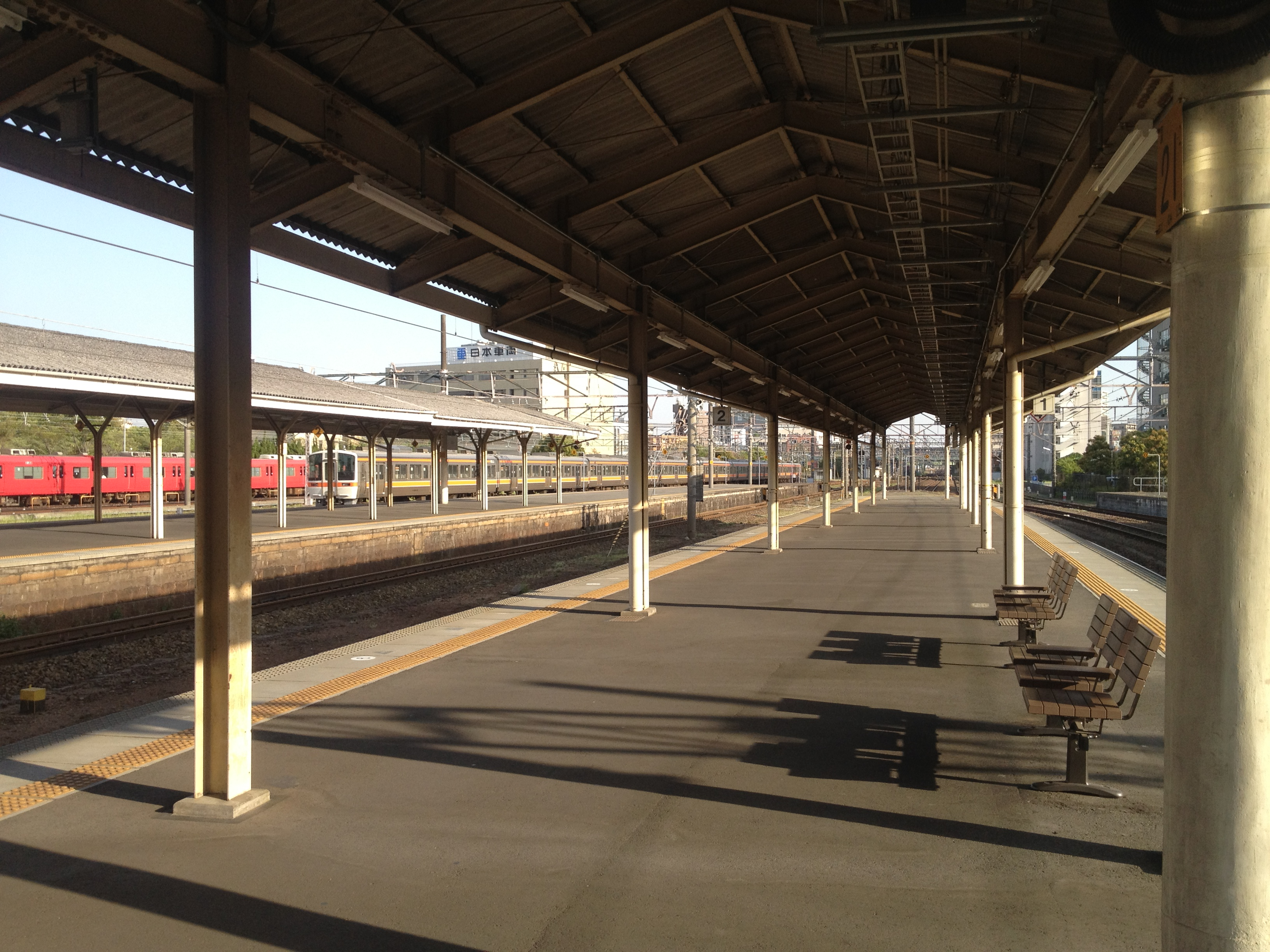
Platform

Atsuta Station (熱田駅, Atsuta-eki) is a railway station in Atsuta-ku, Nagoya, Japan, operated by Central Japan Railway Company (JR Tōkai). Atsuta Station is served by the Tōkaidō Main Line, and is located 360.8 kilometers from the starting point of the line at Tokyo Station.

== History ==
Atsuta Station was opened on March 1, 1886, with the completion of the Japanese Government Railway (JGR) line connecting to Taketoyo Station. This line was named the Tōkaidō Line in 1895 and the Tōkaidō Main Line in 1909. The station was relocated to its present location on September 1, 1896. The station was destroyed in the Bombing of Nagoya in World War II on May 17, 1945, and was rebuilt on June 22, 1947. The JGR became the JNR after World War II. A new station building was completed in October 1982. With the privatization and dissolution of the JNR on April 1, 1987, the station came under the control of the Central Japan Railway Company.

Station numbering was introduced to the section of the Tōkaidō Line operated JR Central in March 2018; Atsuta Station was assigned station number CA65.

== Station layout ==
The station has two island platforms, which are connected to the station building by a footbridge. Tracks 2 and 3 are in normal use, and tracks 1 and 4 are used for special trains. The station building has automated ticket machines, TOICA automated turnstiles and a staffed ticket office.

=== Platforms ===
1, 2	■ Tōkaidō Main Line	for Nagoya, Gifu, and Ōgaki
3, 4	■ Tōkaidō Main Line	for Ōbu, Okazaki, and Toyohashi

== Passenger statistics ==
In fiscal 2017, the station was used by an average of 3,057 passengers daily

== Surrounding area ==
- Atsuta Shrine
- Tokai Polytechnic College
- Nippon Sharyo head office

== See also ==
- List of railway stations in Japan
