= Ōbu Station =

Railway station in Ōbu, Aichi Prefecture, Japan

CA60 CE00 Ōbu Station 大府駅
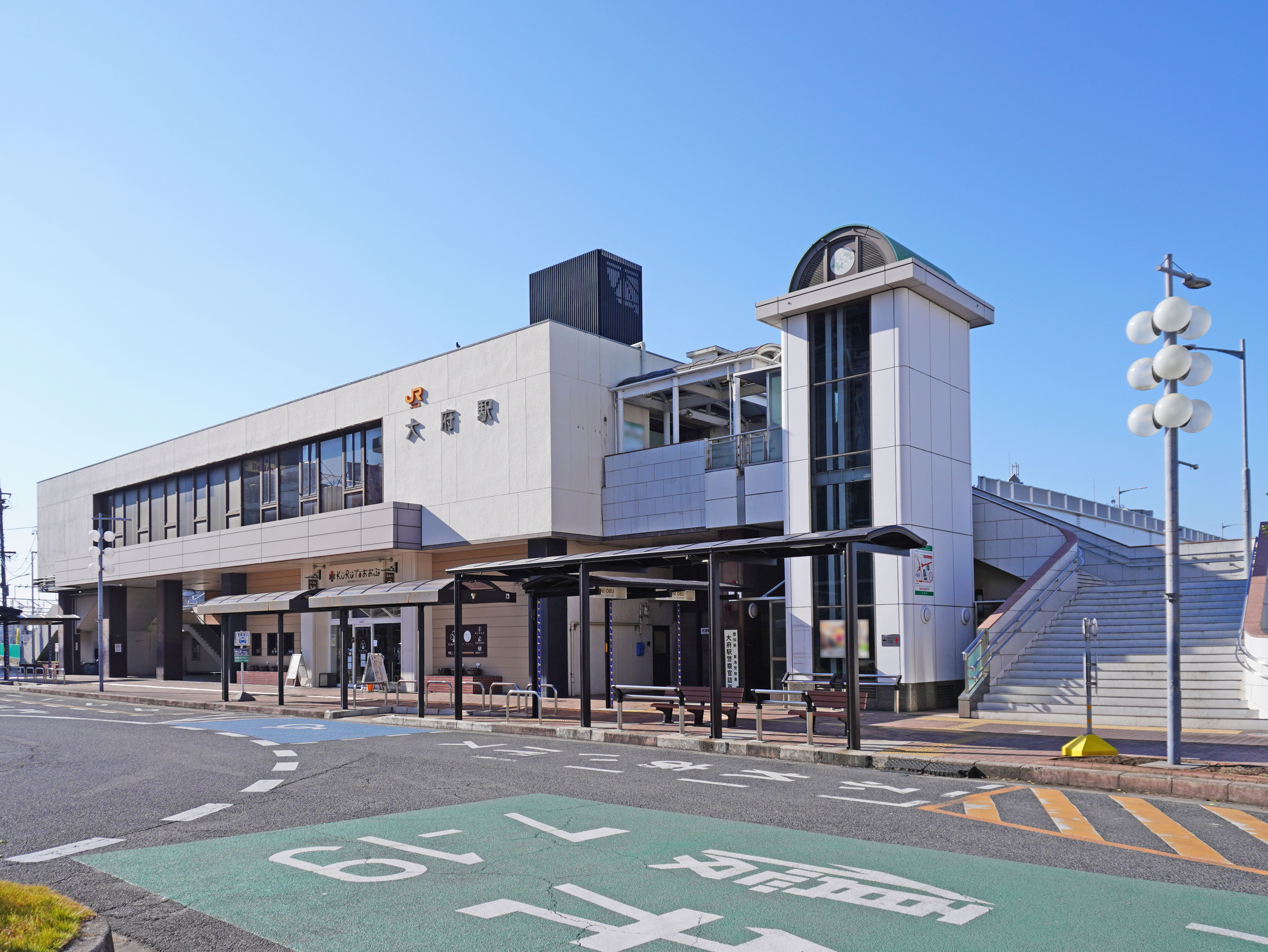
- Ōbu Station, November 2022

General information
- Location: 3-135 Chūō-chō, Ōbu City, Aichi Prefecture 474-0025; Japan
- Coordinates: 35.0086°N 136.9621°E
- Operator: JR Central
- Lines: Tōkaidō Main Line; Taketoyo Line
- Distance: 346.5 km (215.3 mi) from Tokyo
- Platforms: 1 side + 2 island platforms

Other information
- Status: Staffed
- Station code: CA60, CE00
- Website: Official website

History
- Opened: 10 September 1887; 139 years ago

Passengers
- 2023–2024: 26,943 daily

Services
Preceding station	JR Central	Following station
Kyōwa CA61 towards Maibara	Tōkaidō Main Line Local	Aizuma CA59 towards Atami
Kyōwa CA61 towards Maibara	Tōkaidō Main Line Semi Rapid Rapid	Kariya CA58 towards Atami
Kanayama CA66 towards Maibara	Tōkaidō Main Line New Rapid	Kariya CA58 towards Atami
Terminus	Taketoyo Line Local	Owari-Morioka CE01 towards Taketoyo
through to Tōkaidō Main Line	Taketoyo Line Semi Rapid	Owari-Morioka CE01 towards Taketoyo
Location
- Location within Aichi Prefecture Location within Japan

Ōbu Station (大府駅, Ōbu-eki) is a railway station in the city of Ōbu, Aichi Prefecture, Japan, operated by Central Japan Railway Company (JR Tōkai).

Ōbu Station is served by the Tōkaidō Main Line, and is located 346.5 kilometers from the starting point of the line at Tokyo Station. It is also a terminus of the Taketoyo Line and is 14.3 kilometers from the opposing terminus of the station at Taketoyo.

== Station layout ==
The station has a single side platform and two island platforms, serving five tracks, although Platform 5 is not in normal use. The platforms are connected by footbridges. The station building has automated ticket machines, TOICA automated turnstiles and a staffed ticket office.

=== Platforms ===
Usually, Tōkaidō Main Line trains departs from Track 1 and 4, and Taketoyo Line trains does from Track 3. Platform 2 is only used in rush hour when all the trains cannot be handled by other tracks.

1	Tōkaidō Main Line	for Okazaki, Toyohashi, and Hamamatsu
2	Taketoyo Line (in morning rush)	for Higashiura, Handa, and Taketoyo; Direct train from Tōkaidō Line
2	Tōkaidō Main Line (in evening rush)	for Okazaki, Toyohashi, and Hamamatsu
3	Taketoyo Line (usual)	for Higashiura, Handa, and Taketoyo
3	Tōkaidō Main Line (in morning rush)	for Nagoya, Gifu, and Ōgaki; Direct train from Taketoyo Line
4	Tōkaidō Main Line	for Nagoya, Gifu, and Ōgaki
5	■ None	Not used, fenced off

== History ==
Ōbu Station was opened on 10 September 1887 when the section of the Japanese government railway connecting Hamamatsu Station with Ōbu Station was completed. The line north to Atsuta, as well as the present-day Taketoyo Line, was in operation since the year before, but there was no station in Ōbu. The station building was rebuilt in 1978. With the privatization and dissolution of the JNR on 1 April 1987, the station came under the control of the Central Japan Railway Company.

Station numbering was introduced to the section of the Tōkaidō Line operated JR Central as well as the Taketoyo Line in March 2018; Ōbu Station was assigned station number CA60 for the Tōkaidō Line and CA00 for the Taketoyo Line.

== Passenger statistics ==
In fiscal 2018, the station was used by an average of 14,753 passengers daily.

== Surrounding area ==
- Ōbu City Hall
- Ōbu Elementary School
- University of Human Environments, Ōbu campus

== See also ==
- List of railway stations in Japan
