= Chita District =

District in Aichi Prefecture, Japan,

Coordinates: 34°47′34″N 136°53′17″E

Map of Chita District in Aichi Prefecture

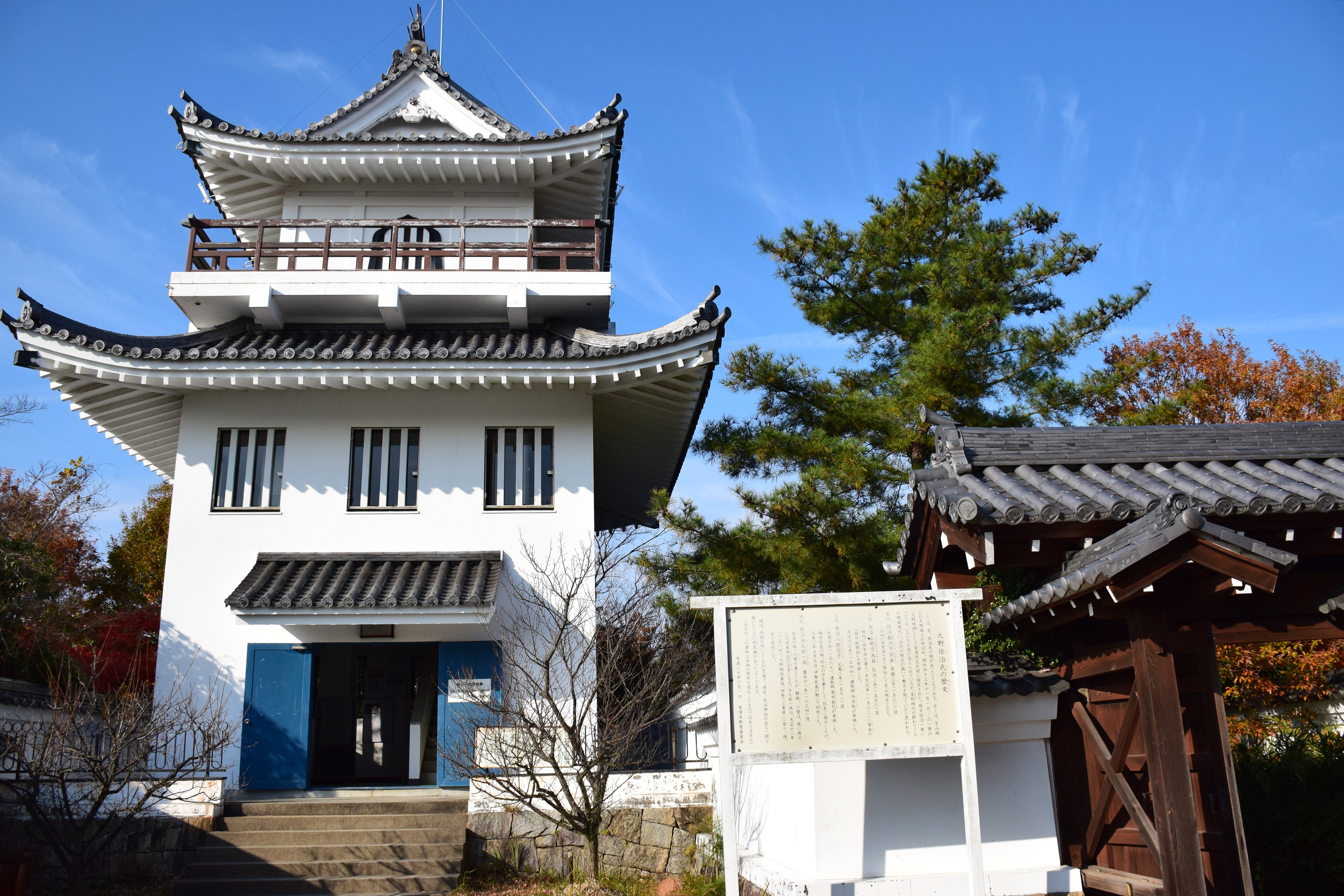
Ōno Castle in the Chita District of Owari Province

Chita (知多郡, Chita-gun) is a district located in southwestern Aichi Prefecture, Japan, on Chita Peninsula.

As of October 1, 2019, the district had an estimated population of 160,542 with a density of 968 persons per km^{2}. Its total area was 165.84 km^{2}.

== Municipalities ==
The district consists of five towns:

- Agui (Note: Classified as a town.)
- Higashiura
- Mihama
- Minamichita
- Taketoyo

== History ==
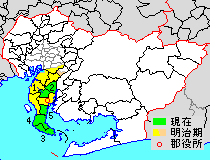
Map showing original extent of Chita District in Aichi Prefecture: * yellow - areas formerly within the district borders during the early Meiji period: 1. Agui-machi; 2. Higashiura-machi; 3. Mihama-machi; 4. Minamichita-machi; 5. Taketoyo-machi

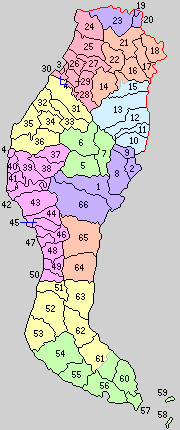
Colored areas are in this district.

Chita District was one of the ancient districts of Owari Province and is mentioned in Nara period records. One of the castles that guarded the area was Ōno Castle.

Modern Chita District dates to the cadastral reforms of the early Meiji period, and was initially given to Nukata Prefecture in former Mikawa Province, whereas the holdings of former Owari Domain became Nagoya Prefecture. With the creation of Aichi Prefecture, Chita District again came to be considered part of former Owari Province.

=== District Timeline ===
With the organization of municipalities on October 1, 1889, Chita District was divided into four towns (Handa, Kamezaki, Yokosuka, Ono) and 63 villages. In December 1890, Narawa and Tokoname were also elevated to town status, followed by Taketoyo in February 1891, Arimatsu in September 1892 and Utsumi in November 1893. Otaka and Morozaki became towns in September 1894, followed by Kyōwa and Otaka in May 1903 and Toyohama in February 1905. The number of remaining villages was consolidated from 52 to 14 in 1906, leaving the district with 14 towns and 14 villages.

Nishiura became a town in December 1911, followed by Obu in November 1915 and Yawata in March 1922. Handa was proclaimed a city on October 1, 1937, merging with the towns of Kamezaki and Narawa. The village of Ueno became a town in February 1940, followed by Noma in July 1942. This left Chita District with 16 towns and nine villages at the end of World War II.

In June 1946, the village of Higashiura was elevated to town status. In October 1951, the village of Onizaki became a town, followed by Asahi in April 1952, Kosugaya in July 1952, Agui in January 1953. On April 1, 1954 the city of Tokoname was established by the merger of the towns of Tokoname, Ōno, Onizaki and Nishiura and the village of Sanwa.

On April 1, 1955, Kyōwa and Noma towns merged to form the town of Mihama. On the same day, the towns of Yawata, Okada and Asahi merged to form the town of Chita. Kosugaya Town was dissolved on March 31, 1957, with portions joining neighboring Tokoname and Mihama. On June 1, 1961, the towns of Utsumi, Toyohama, and Morozaki merged to form Minamichita. In December 1964, the towns of Arimatsu and Otaka were annexed by Nagoya, becoming part of Midori-ku. On April 1, 1969, the city of Tōkai was established by the merger of the towns of Ueno and Yokosuka.

On September 1, 1970, the towns of Obu and Chita were both elevated to city status, leaving the district with 5 towns.
