= Taketoyo Station =

Railway station in Taketoyo, Aichi Prefecture, Japan

CE09 Taketoyo Station 武豊駅
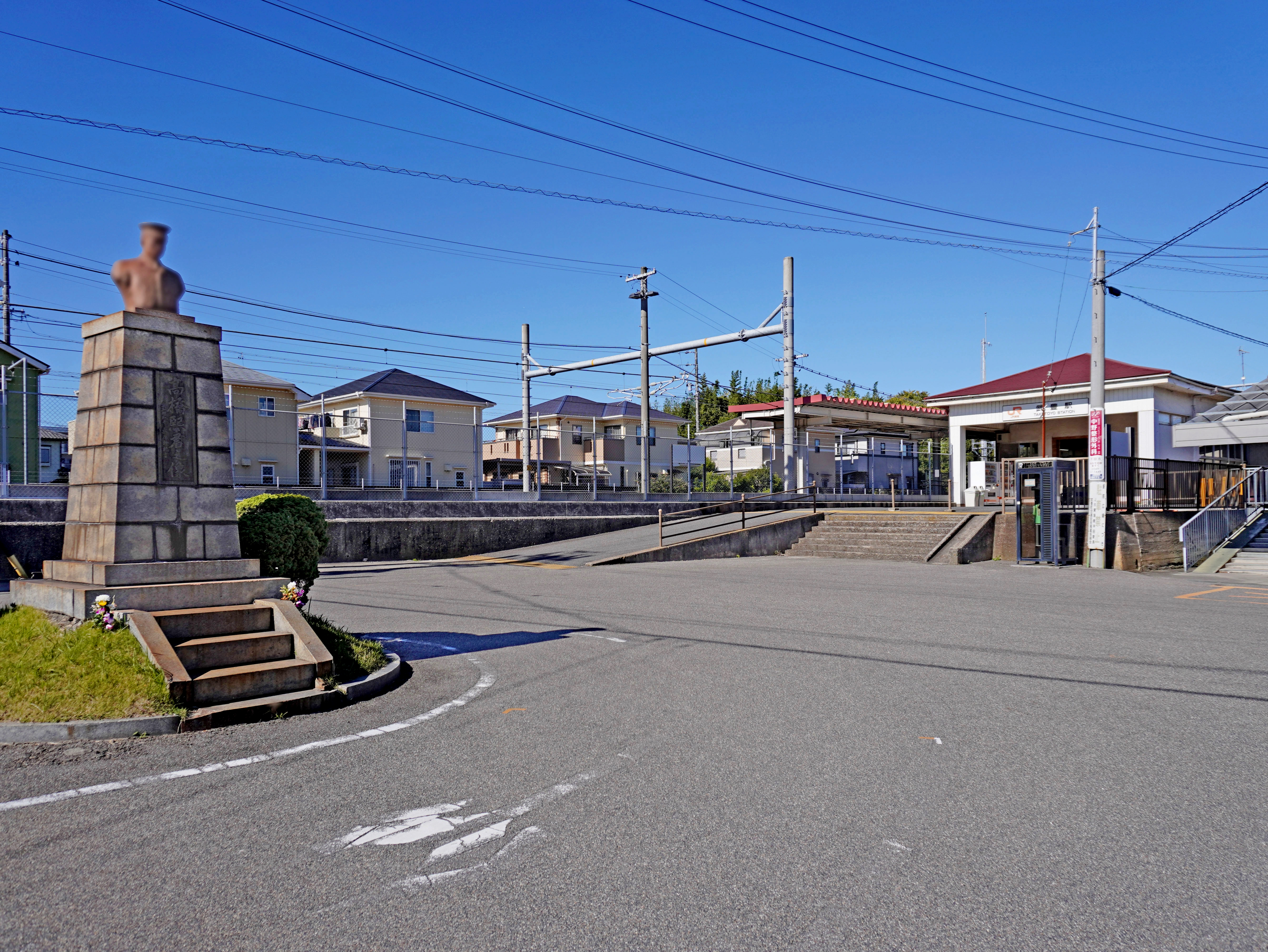
- Taketoyo Station in November 2022

General information
- Location: Kaneshita, Taketoyo-machi, Chita-gun, Aichi-ken 470-2344; Japan
- Coordinates: 34.8538°N 136.9205°E
- Operator: JR Central
- Line: Taketoyo Line
- Distance: 19.3 kilometers from Ōbu
- Platforms: 1 side platform

Other information
- Status: Unstaffed
- Station code: CE09
- Website: Official website

History
- Opened: March 1, 1886

Passengers
- FY2018: 677 daily

Services
Preceding station	JR Central	Following station
Higashi-Narawa towards Ōbu	Taketoyo Line Local Semi Rapid	Terminus
Location
- Location within Aichi Prefecture Location within Japan

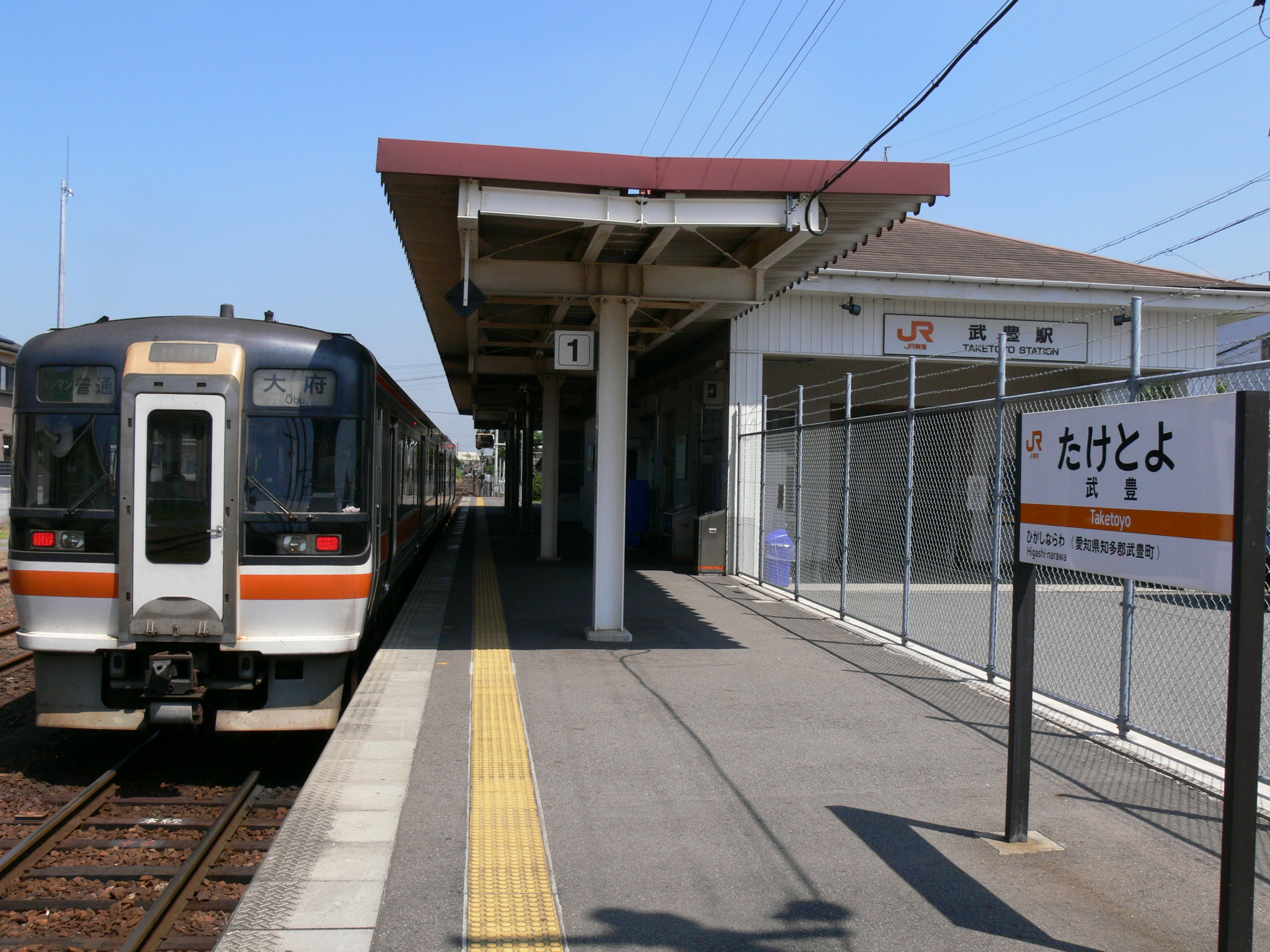
Platform

Taketoyo Station (武豊駅, Taketoyo-eki) is a railway station in the town of Taketoyo, Chita District, Aichi Prefecture, Japan, operated by Central Japan Railway Company (JR Tōkai).

Taketoyo Station is the terminal station of the Taketoyo Line, and is located 19.3 kilometers from the opposing terminus of the line at Ōbu Station.

== Station layout ==
The station has a single side platform. The station has automated ticket machines, TOICA automated turnstiles and is unattended.

== History ==
Taketoyo Station was opened on March 1, 1886 as a passenger and freight station on the Japanese Government Railways (JGR), but was relocated to its present location in June 1892. Freight operations were relocated to Taketoyo-Minato station from April 1, 1930, but that station was closed in August 1965. The JGR became the Japan National Railway (JNR) after World War II. Freight operations were discontinued from November 15, 1975. With the privatization and dissolution of the JNR on April 1, 1987, the station came under the control of the Central Japan Railway Company. Automatic turnstiles were installed in May 1992, and the TOICA system of magnetic fare cards was implemented in November 2006.

Station numbering was introduced to the Taketoyo Line in March 2018; Taketoyo Station was assigned station number CE09.

== Passenger statistics ==
In fiscal 2018, the station was used by an average of 677 passengers daily (boarding passengers only).

== Surrounding area ==
- Taketoyo Elementary School

== See also ==
- List of railway stations in Japan
