= Cheat Codes (disambiguation) =

Cheat codes are game codes that allow the player to beat the game or acquire benefits without earning them.

Cheat Codes may also refer to:

- CheatCodes.com, gaming website
- Cheat Codes (album), studio album by Danger Mouse and Black Thought
- Cheat Codes (DJs), American DJ trio

== See also ==
- Cheat (disambiguation)
- Cheater (disambiguation)
- Cheating (disambiguation)
