= E87 =

E87 may refer to:

- BMW 1 Series (E87)
- European route E87
- King's Indian Defense, Encyclopaedia of Chess Openings code
- Chitahantō Road, Chitaōdan Road and Chubu International Airport Connecting Road, route E87 in Japan
