= Chita =

Chita may refer to:

== People ==
- Alin Chița (born 1977), Romanian footballer
- Oussama Chita (born 1996), Algerian footballer
- Chita Foras, Italian-Argentine actress born Josefína Foras Cossini (1900–1986)
- Chita Rivera, stage name of American actress and singer Dolores Conchita Figueroa del Rivero (1933–2024)
- Chita Smedberg (born 1971), Finnish sailor
- Pedro Miranda (baseball), nicknamed “Chita”, Colombian baseball player (1922–2002)

== Places ==
=== Japan ===
- Chita, Aichi
- Chita District, Aichi
- Chita Peninsula, a peninsula on central Honshu

=== Russia ===
- Chita, Zabaykalsky Krai, a city
  - Chita constituency
  - Chita Oblast, a former federal subject of Russia
  - Chita railway station
  - Chita Republic (1905–1906), a worker's republic
  - Chita, another name for the river Chitinka
- Chita, Republic of Tatarstan, a village (selo)

=== Other countries ===
- Chita, Boyacá, Colombia
- Chita, Texas, United States

== Other uses ==
- Chita (film), an Indian Bengali-language action film
- Chita (tug), a Spanish salvage tug, formerly HMS Seahorse
- FC Chita, a Russian football club
- Chita Noriai (Chita Bus), Japanese bus company
- Cheeta, or Chita, a chimpanzee character

== See also ==
- Chitta (Buddhism), Buddhist psychological construct
- Cheta (disambiguation)
- Cheetah (disambiguation)
- Chitas, a Hebrew acronym for Chumash, Tehillim, and Tanya
- Chitinsky (disambiguation) adjective
