= Irimi Shell Midden =

Archaeological site in Japan

Irimi shell midden
- 入海貝塚 (Japanese)
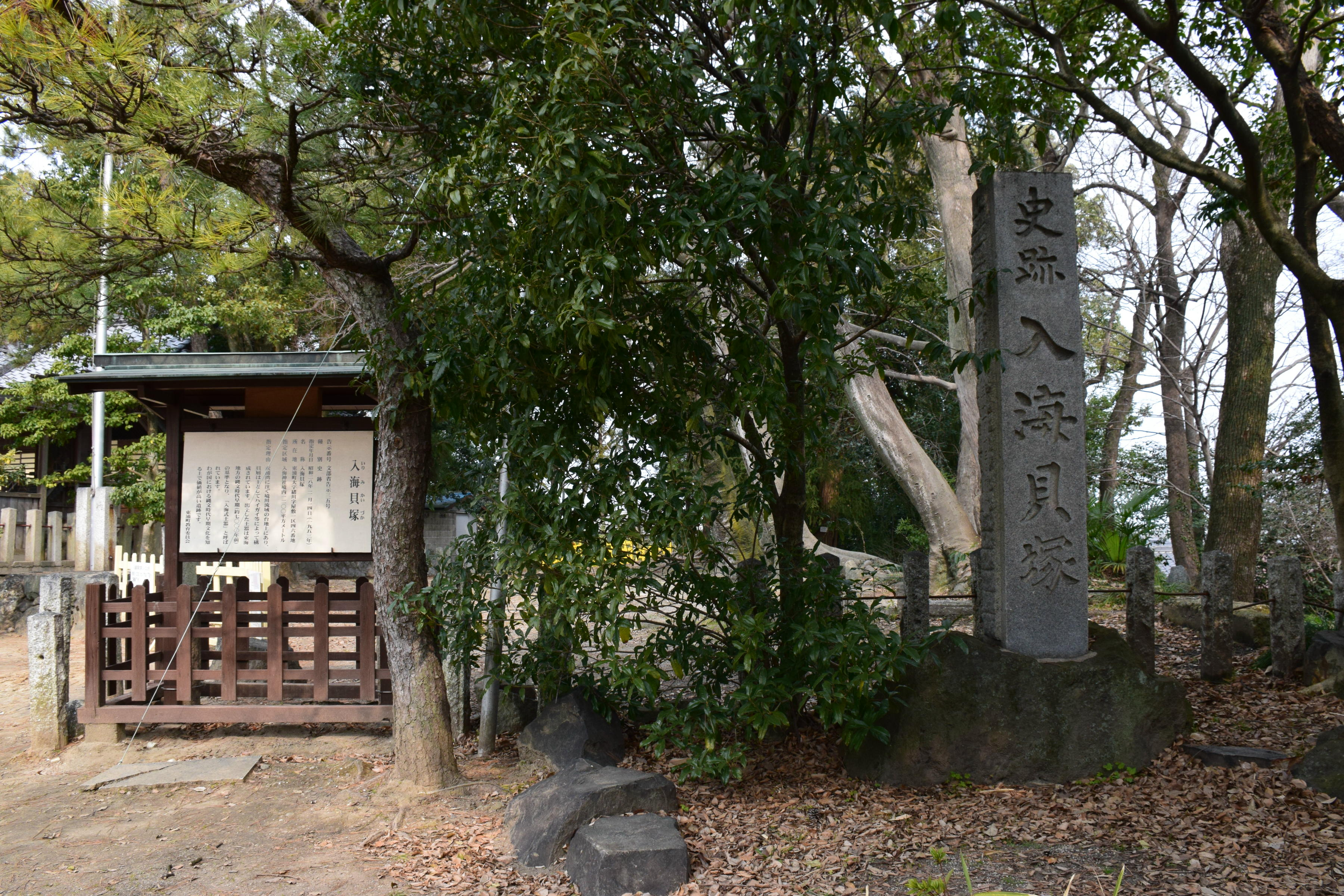
- Irimi shell midden

- Irimi shell midden Irimi Shell Midden (Japan)
- 34°59′08″N 136°58′11″E
- Type: midden
- Periods: Jōmon period
- Location: Higashiura, Aichi, Japan
- Region: Tōkai region

Site notes
- Public access: Yes

The Irimi shell midden (入海貝塚, Irimi kaizuka) is an archaeological site containing a Jōmon period shell midden located in the Ogawa neighborhood of the town of Higashiura, Aichi in the Tōkai region of Japan. The site was designated as a National Historic Site in 1953.

== Overview ==
During the early to middle Jōmon period (approximately 4000 to 2500 BC), sea levels were five to six meters higher than at present, and the ambient temperature was also 2 deg C higher. During this period, the Kantō region was inhabited by the Jōmon people, many of whom lived in coastal settlements. The middens associated with such settlements contain bone, botanical material, mollusc shells, sherds, lithics, and other artifacts and ecofacts associated with the now-vanished inhabitants, and these features, provide a useful source into the diets and habits of Jōmon society. Most of these middens are found along the Pacific coast of Japan.

The Irimi shell midden is approximately 10 meters wide by 80 meters in length and as discovered during the Taishō period. Is located within the grounds of the Irimi Shrine. It is located at the base of Chita Peninsula, on a river terrace with an elevation of 12 meters above the present sea level, on the right bank of the Sakai River which flows into Kinugaura Bay. The midden has been excavated four times by Nanzan University, during which examples of Jōmon pottery, stone tools, animal bone and horn implements, clay figurines and other objects dating from around 7000 years ago were discovered. The thickness of the shell layer is about 40 cm at the thin part and about 110 cm at the thick part of the midden. The composition of the shell mound is about 75% mussels and about 15% oysters. These shellfish are found in tidal flats, which must have existed in close proximity to the settlement trace. The upper layers the midden contained late Jōmon period pottery, as well as Yayoi pottery and Sue ware and Haji ware from the Kofun period, indicating that the site had been inhabited for thousands of years.

The midden is located about 10 minutes on foot from the JR Central Taketoyo Line's Ogawa Station, but was backfilled after excavation, and there are no public facilities at site.

== See also ==
- List of Historic Sites of Japan (Aichi)
