= Kimagure Cook =

Japanese YouTube channel

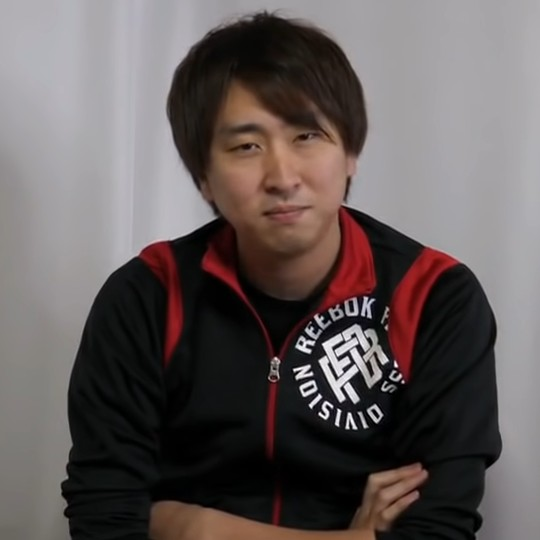
- Born: 31 May 1991 (age 35); Aichi Prefecture, Japan
- Other name: Kaneko
- Occupation: YouTuber

YouTube information
- Channel: きまぐれクックKimagure Cook
- Years active: 2016–present
- Genres: Cooking, Fishing, Seafood
- Subscribers: 11.9 million
- Views: 3.18 billion
- Last updated: 4 September 2024
- Website: Official website

Kimagure Cook (Japanese: きまぐれクック, romanized: kimagure kukku, lit. 'Whimsical Cook') is a YouTube channel established in 2016 by Japanese YouTuber Kaneko, focused on cleaning, cutting, and cooking a wide variety of seafood with humorous narration from Kaneko.

== Outline ==
Kimagure Cook videos feature Kaneko preparing seafood with an emphasis on unusual or rare species, such as sharks, moray eels, giant squids, and seahorses. Before he prepares the seafood, he typically says his catchphrase Japanese: 捌いていく！, romanized: sabaite iku!, lit. 'Let's prepare it!'.

While the scenes shown are often graphic, he usually does not depict the killing of live seafood.

After the seafood is prepared, he usually eats the dish together with an Asahi beer after saying his catchphrase Japanese: 銀色のヤツ！, romanized: gin-iro no yatsu!, lit. 'The silver one!', a reference to the silver color of the beer can.

His most popular videos have English subtitles and a wide international following.

Kaneko also operates a channel called Japanese: きまぐれクックのサボり場！, romanized: kimagure kukku no saboriba!, lit. 'Whimsical Cook's Procrastination Zone!' where he uploads a variety of videos both supplemental to and off-topic from his main channel, including a series on rare fruits.

His earlier videos also often included his cat, Tora, and some short videos would be centered around Tora. Tora's appearances later became much more sproadic as he did not wish to use his pet mainly as a business tool.

== Biography ==
Kaneko was born in a fishing town near Ise Bay. Growing up, he learned about cooking, fishing, and seafood from his parents, who were chefs. He attended Nagoya Technical High School and entered the service industry. Currently, he is based in Chita Peninsula, Aichi Prefecture.

In 2016, he made his YouTube debut with a channel called Japanese: にしやんfishingclub, romanized: nishiyan fishingclub, lit. 'Nishiyan Fishing Club' with a group of friends. In 2017, after quitting his job in the service industry, he began creating content regularly on his own channel to avoid saturating Nishiyan Fishing Club with his own videos.

Kaneko has a license to prepare Fugu from Aichi Prefecture.

In July 2020, Kaneko publicly announced his marriage on Twitter.

In June 2021, Kaneko left Kiii due to the resignation of the former president.

Kaneko announced in November 2021 that he and his wife celebrated the birth of their first child, and that he would be taking a break from YouTube to focus on raising his child. He returned to YouTube in January 2022, revealing that he would be moving to a new filming site.

In October 2025, Kaneko opened his first physical restaurant called Uoichiban (うお一番), located in Tokoname, Aichi.
