= Chitinsky =

Chitinsky (masculine), Chitinskaya (feminine), or Chitinskoye (neuter) may refer to:

- Chitinsky District, a district of Zabaykalsky Krai, Russia
- Chita Oblast (Chitinskaya oblast), a former federal subject of Russia

== See also ==
- Chita (disambiguation)
