= CheatCodes.com =

Gaming website

- Website type: Video Games
- Owner: gamerID Network LLC.
- Creator: gamerID Network LLC.
- Revenue: Private
- Website: www.cheatcodes.com
- Commercial: Yes
- Registration: Optional
- Launched: October 31, 1996
- Current status: Online
- Content license: Copyrighted

CheatCodes.com is a gaming website that has published video game cheat codes, FAQs, and walkthroughs since 1996. The website currently publishes content for PlayStation 4, PlayStation 3, PlayStation 2, PlayStation, Xbox One, Xbox 360, Xbox, Wii U, Wii, GameCube, Nintendo 64, PlayStation Vita, PlayStation Portable, Nintendo DS, Nintendo 3DS, Game Boy Advance, Game Boy, N-Gage, Dreamcast, Facebook, Android, iOS, and PC games.

== History ==
The original idea for CheatCodes.com was conceived in 1996, when the domain name was initially registered, and a simple home page with a small amount of video game content was put in place. At the time, site co-founder Steve Jenkins envisioned a more interactive video game cheat site that would allow visitors to customize their view of the content based on the specific games they owned. Jenkins was busy with other projects at the time, including managing WinFiles, a software download site he had started in 1995. After selling WinFiles to CNET in 1999, Steve saw that the need for a "filtered" view of this type of content was still unmet, and decided to turn his primary focus to CheatCodes.com.

In October 2000, Jenkins was joined by programmer Steve Cook and brother Harlyn Jenkins (who had worked with his brother managing content on WinFiles), and began to build the database infrastructure required to provide extended functionality for the site."

The site was re-launched as a database-driven content site on August 5, 2001. The re-launch was covered in InfoWorld by contributing editor Brian Livingston, who wrote "A new e-business site will launch today with more than 198,000 subscribers already registered via e-mail. The story of how this was accomplished tells a lot about viral marketing on the Web.

By 2002, CheatCodes.com' strategy of providing fresh content to a niche audience was paying off, and they were growing quickly. To handle the extra bandwidth required, they moved hosts from their provider in Albuquerque, New Mexico to Digital Forest just outside Seattle, Washington.

In early 2005, Digital Forest informed their customers that they were expanding to a new and improved hosting facility, about 30 miles from their old facility, requiring another server move.

On November 8, 2006, CheatCodes.com launched a major update of the site and termed it "Version 2." In addition to functionality updates, the site was completely re-designed to be XHTML compliant, and made full use of Cascading Style Sheets.

On September 23, 2008, the company registered United States Trademark #3,503,531 for the term "cheat code."

== See also ==
- Cheating in video games
