= Handa, Aichi =

Handa 半田市
- City
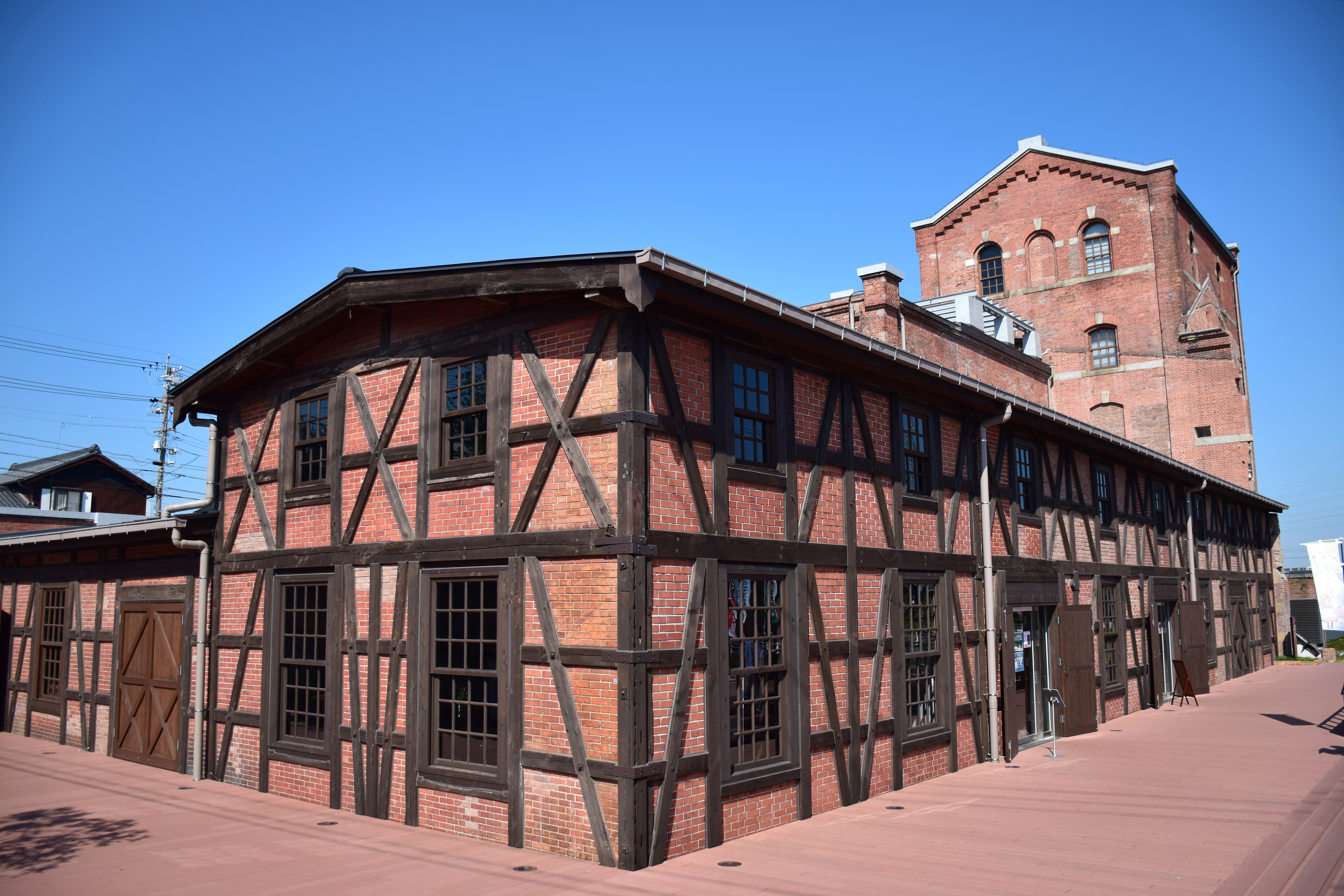
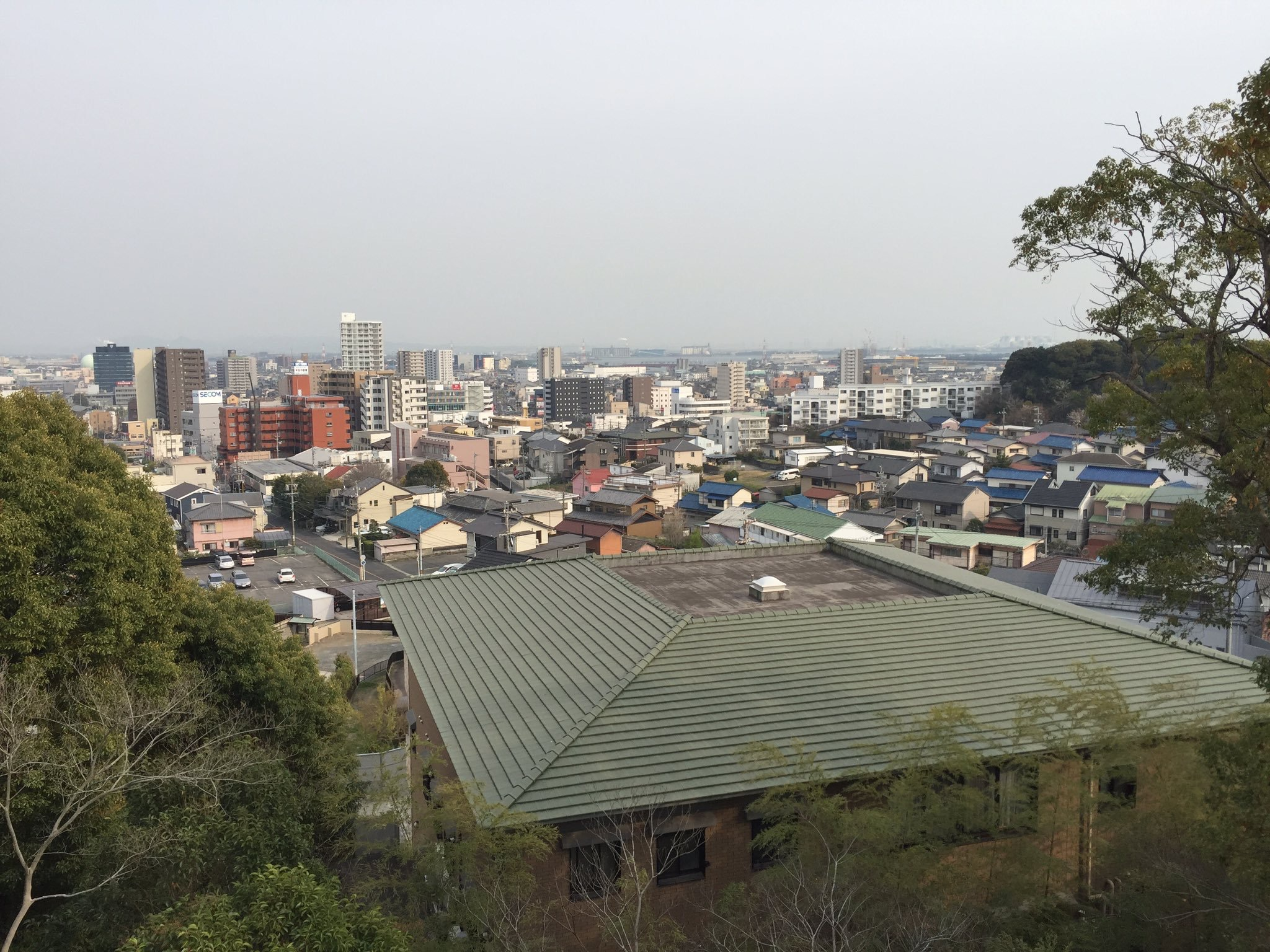
- Upper stage:Handa Red Brick Warehouse; Lower stage:Skyline of Handa City

- Flag Seal

- Location of Handa in Aichi Prefecture

- Coordinates: 34°53′31″N 136°56′17″E
- Country: Japan
- Region: Chūbu (Tōkai)
- Prefecture: Aichi
- District: Chita (formerly)

Government
  - Mayor: Takahiro Kuze

Area
  - Total: 47.42 km^{2} (18.31 sq mi)

Population (October 1, 2019)
  - Total: 118,259
  - Density: 2,494/km^{2} (6,459/sq mi)
- Time zone: UTC+9 (Japan Standard Time)
  - Tree: Japanese Black Pine
  - Flower: Satsuki azalea
- Phone number: 0569-21-3111
- Address: 2-1 Tōyō-chō, Handa-shi, Aichi-ken 475-8666
- Website: Official website

Handa (半田市, Handa-shi) is a city located in Aichi Prefecture, Japan. As of 1 October 2019, the city had an estimated population of 118,259 in 51,846 households, and a population density of 2,494 persons per km^{2}. The total area of the city was 47.42 square kilometres (18.31 sq mi).

== Geography ==
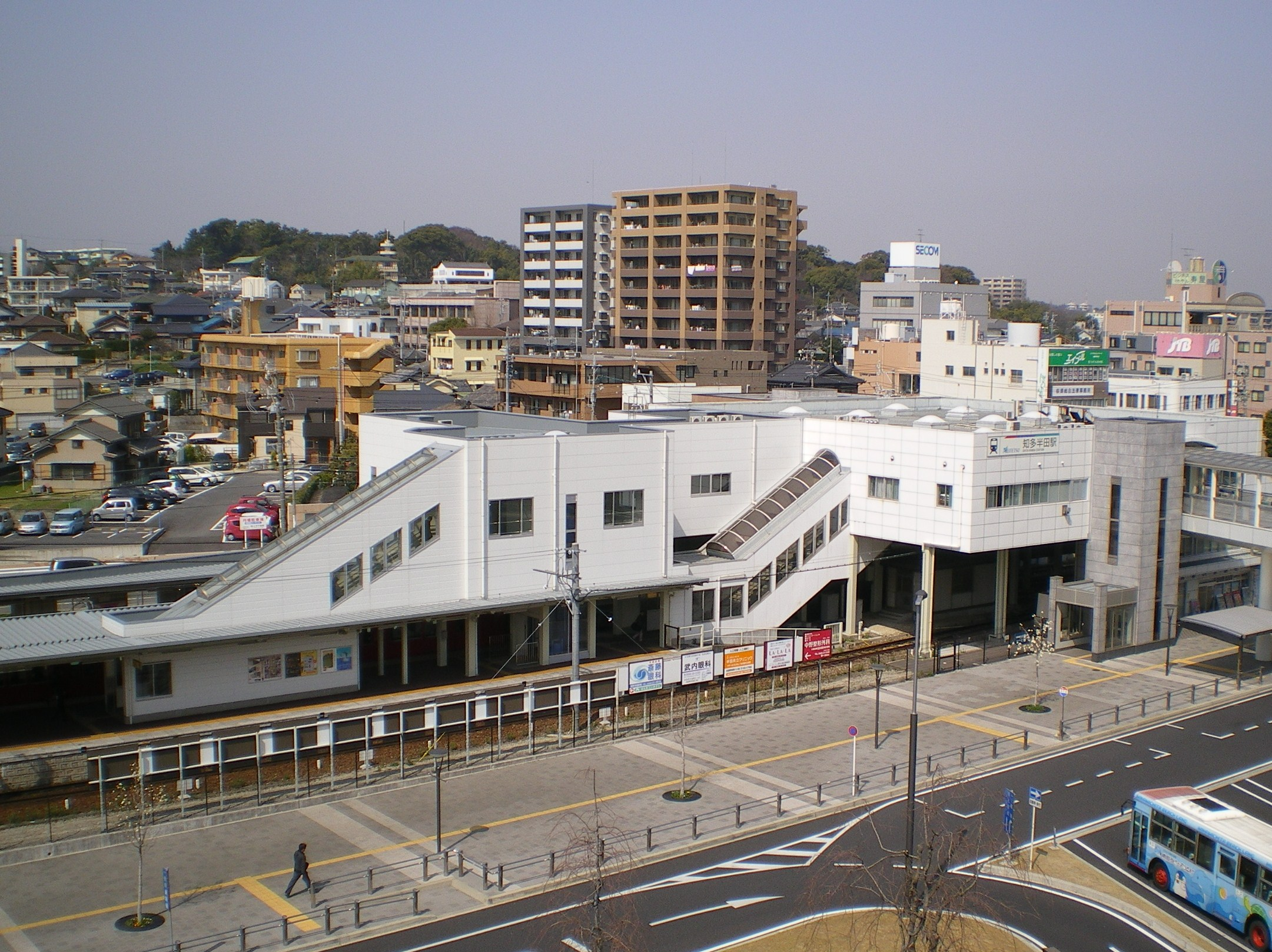
Downtown of Handa City

Handa is located in northeastern Chita Peninsula in southern Aichi Prefecture, and is bordered by Mikawa Bay to the east.

=== Climate ===
The city has a climate characterized by hot and humid summers, and relatively mild winters (Köppen climate classification Cfa). The average annual temperature in Handa is 15.6 °C. The average annual rainfall is 1632 mm with September as the wettest month. The temperatures are highest on average in August, at around 40.5 °C, and lowest in January, at around negative 4 °C.

=== Demographics ===
Per Japanese census data, the population of Handa has increased steadily over the past 70 years.

Historical population
Year	Pop.	±%
1940	49,153	—
1950	62,860	+27.9%
1960	71,370	+13.5%
1970	80,663	+13.0%
1980	89,328	+10.7%
1990	99,550	+11.4%
2000	110,837	+11.3%
2010	118,829	+7.2%

=== Neighboring municipalities ===
Aichi Prefecture

- Agui
- Hekinan
- Higashiura
- Takahama
- Taketoyo
- Tokoname

== History ==
=== Early modern period ===
During the Edo period, the area of Handa was part of Owari Domain.

=== Late modern period ===
In the post-Meiji restoration establishment of the modern municipalities system on October 1, 1889, the towns of Handa and Kamezaki were founded, as was the town of Narawa the following year. These three towns merged on October 1, 1937, to form the city of Handa.

== Government ==
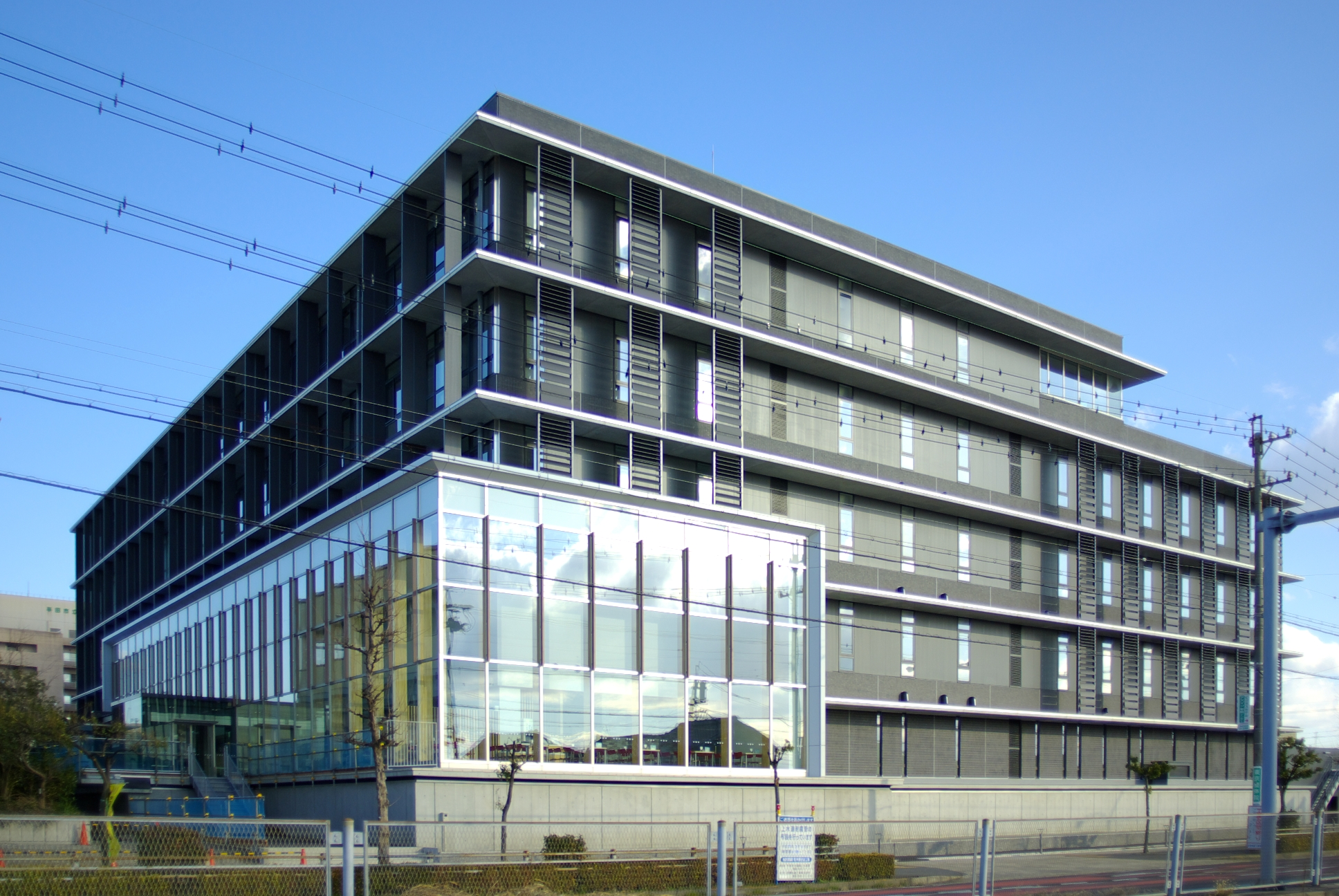
Handa city hall

Handa has a mayor-council form of government with a directly elected mayor and a unicameral city legislature of 22 members. The city contributes two members to the Aichi Prefectural Assembly. In terms of national politics, the city is part of Aichi District 8 of the lower house of the Diet of Japan.

== Sister cities ==
- Midland, Michigan, United States, since June 5, 1981.
- Port Macquarie, New South Wales, Australia, since April 14, 1990.
- Xuzhou, Jiangsu, China, friendship city since May 27, 1993
- (Japan) Nanto, Toyama Prefecture, since April 28, 1997

== Economy ==
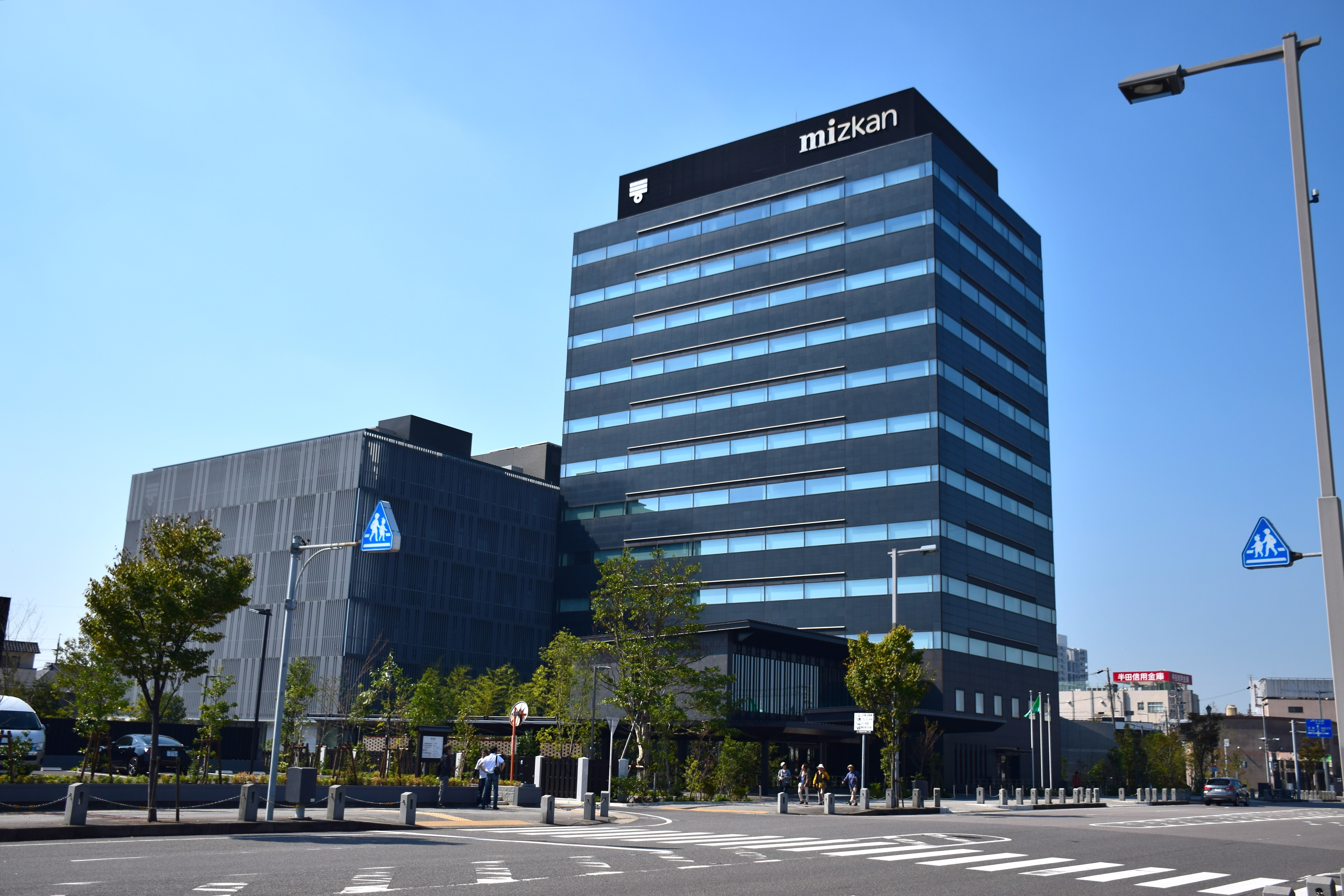
Mizkan

=== Secondary sector of the economy ===
==== Brewing ====
Handa has a strong historical connection with soy sauce, sake and vinegar brewing, and remains the worldwide headquarters of the Mizkan Vinegar Group.

==== Manufacturing ====
During World War II, Nakajima Aircraft Company established an aircraft production plant in Handa. In the post-war period, this was redeveloped into a heavy industrial zone, including a production plant by Dow Chemical. Handa and Midland, Michigan became Sister Cities in 1981, a relationship that continues to this day.

== Education ==
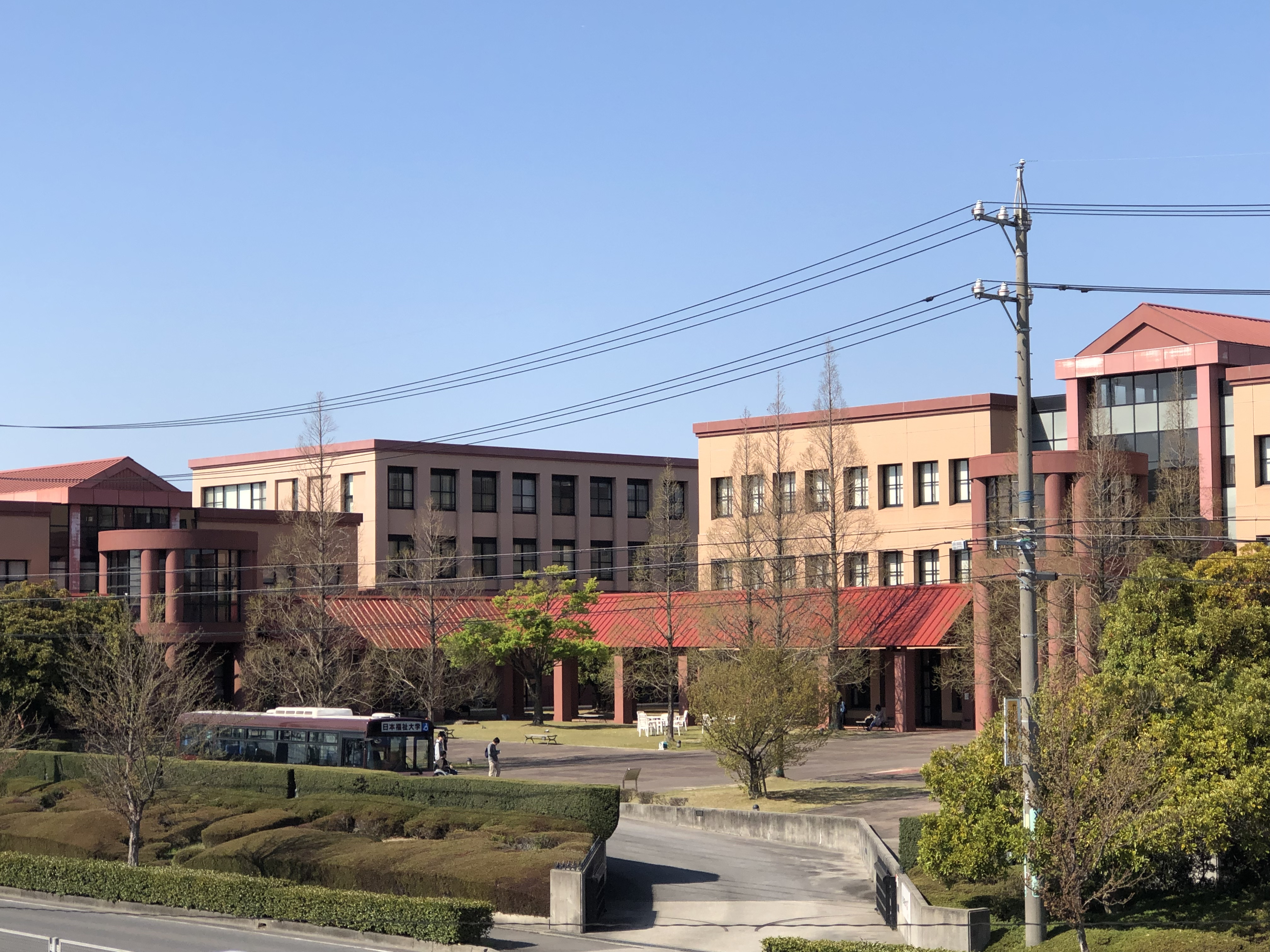
Nihon Fukushi University（Handa campus）

=== University ===
- Nihon Fukushi University – Handa campus

=== Schools ===
- Handa has thirteen public elementary schools and five public middle schools operated by the city government, and five public high schools operated by the Aichi Prefectural Board of Education. The prefecture also operates two special education schools for the handicapped.

== Transportation ==
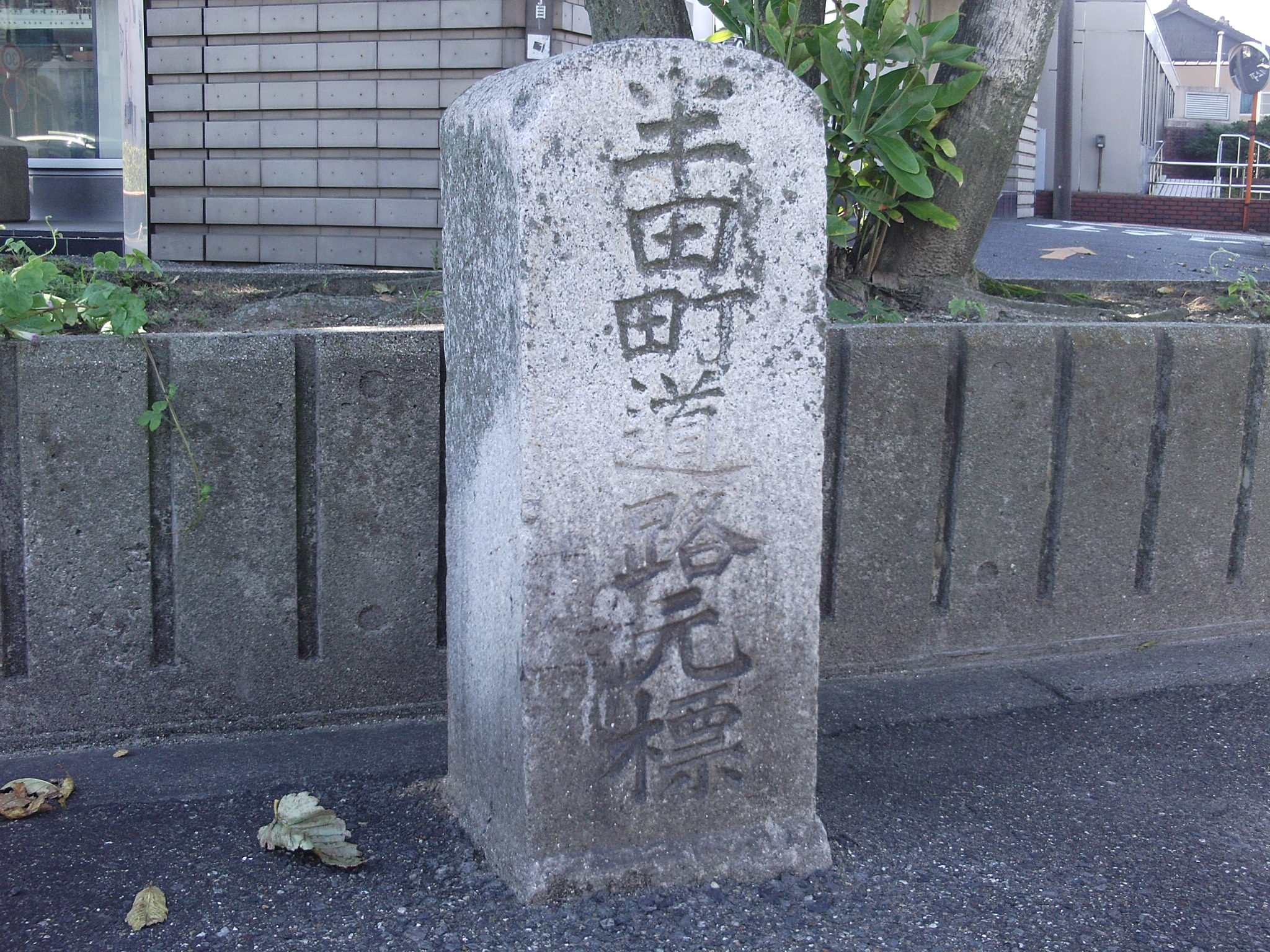
The Kilometre Zero of Handa

=== Railways ===
==== Conventional lines ====
Central Japan Railway Company

- Taketoyo Line: - Kamezaki – Okkawa – Handa – Higashi-Narawa –

Meitetsu

- Kōwa Line: - Handaguchi – Sumiyoshichō – Chita-Handa – Narawa –

Kinuura Rinkai Railway

- Handa Line: - (freight only)

=== Roads ===
==== Expressways ====
- Chitahantō Road
- Minamichita Road
- Chitaōdan Road

==== Japan National Routes ====
- National Route 247
- National Route 366
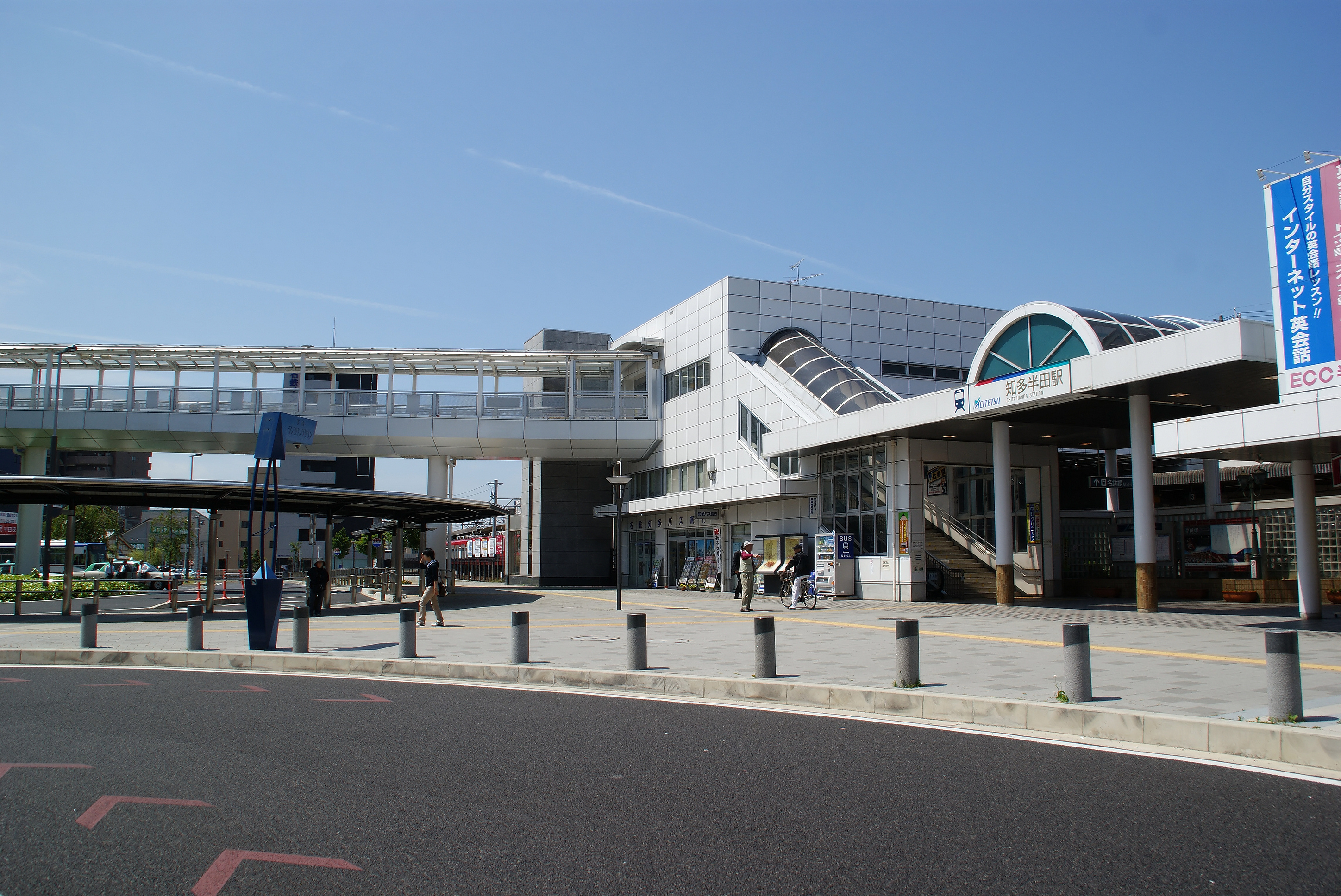
Chita Handa Station

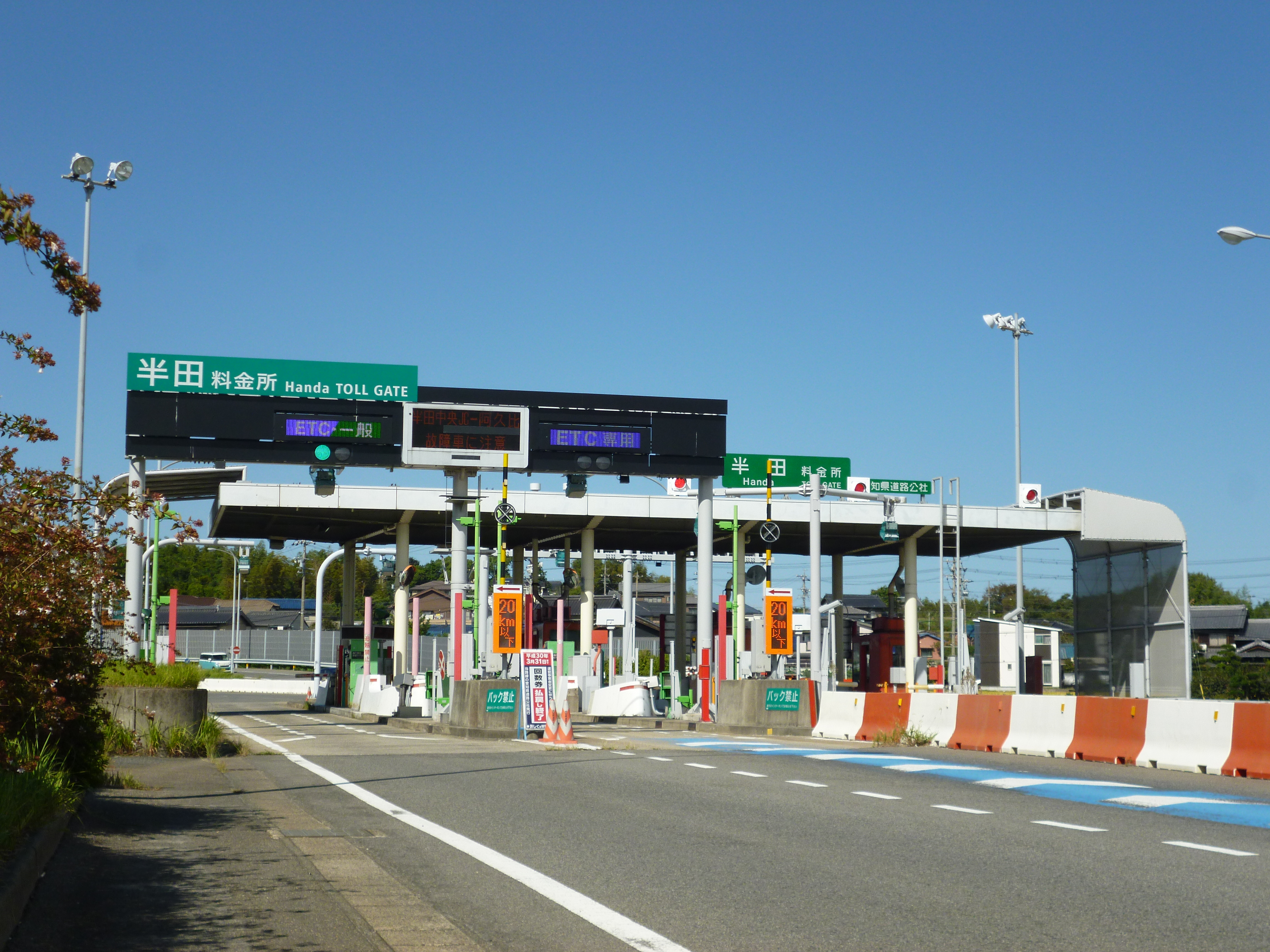
Handa Interchange

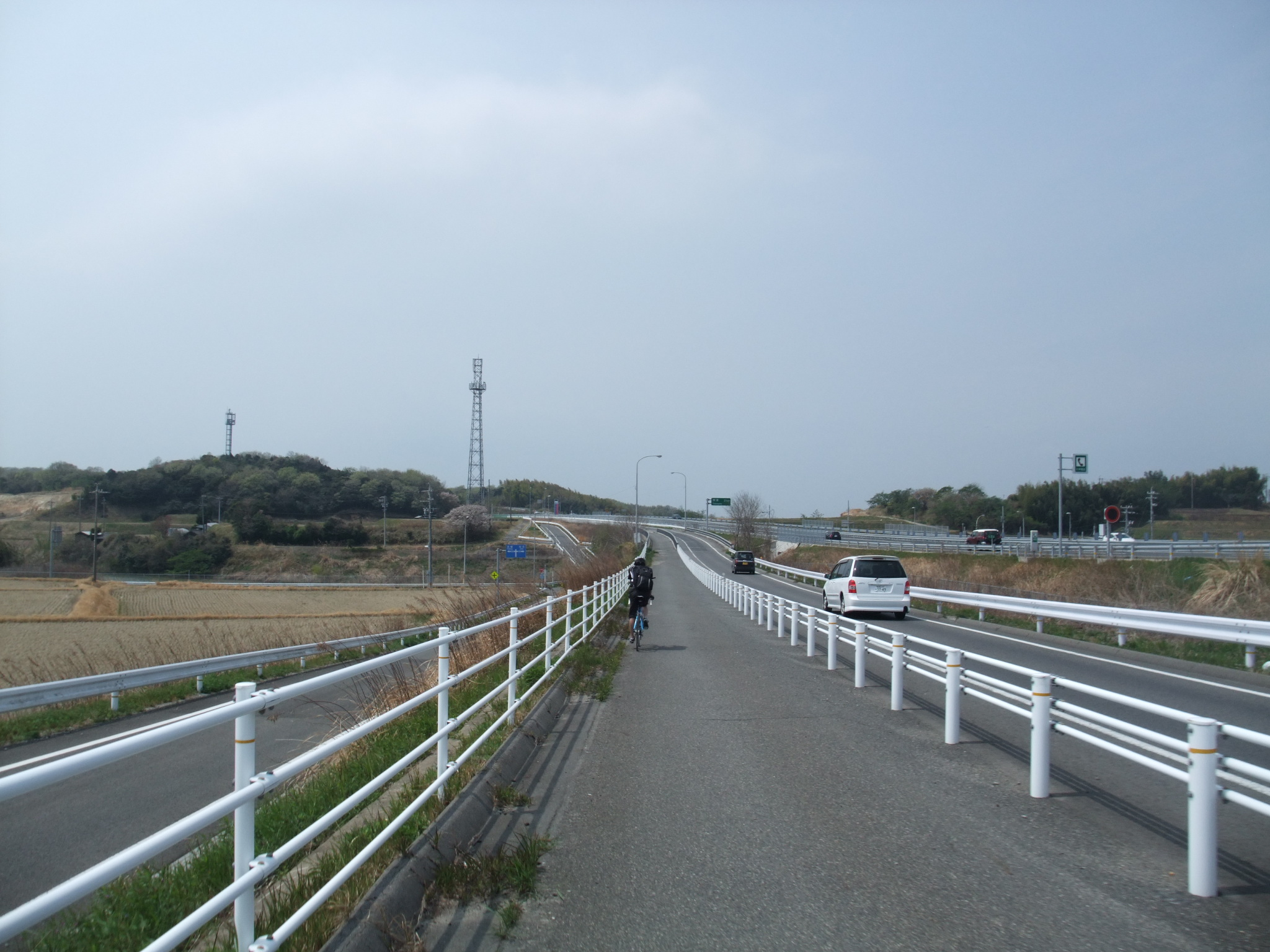
Chitaōdan Road and Chita Cycling Road

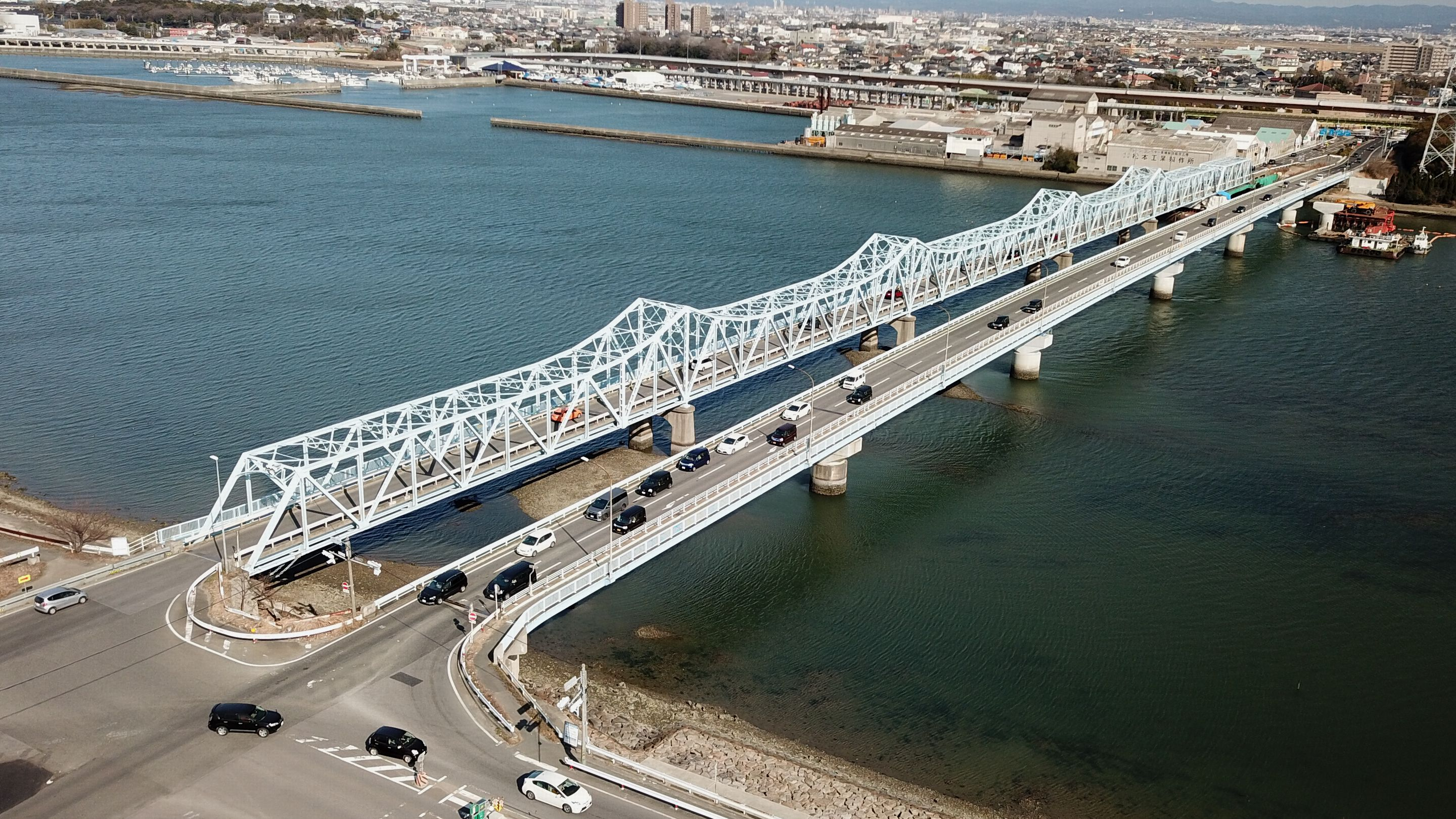
Kinuura Oh-hashi Bridge

== Local attractions ==
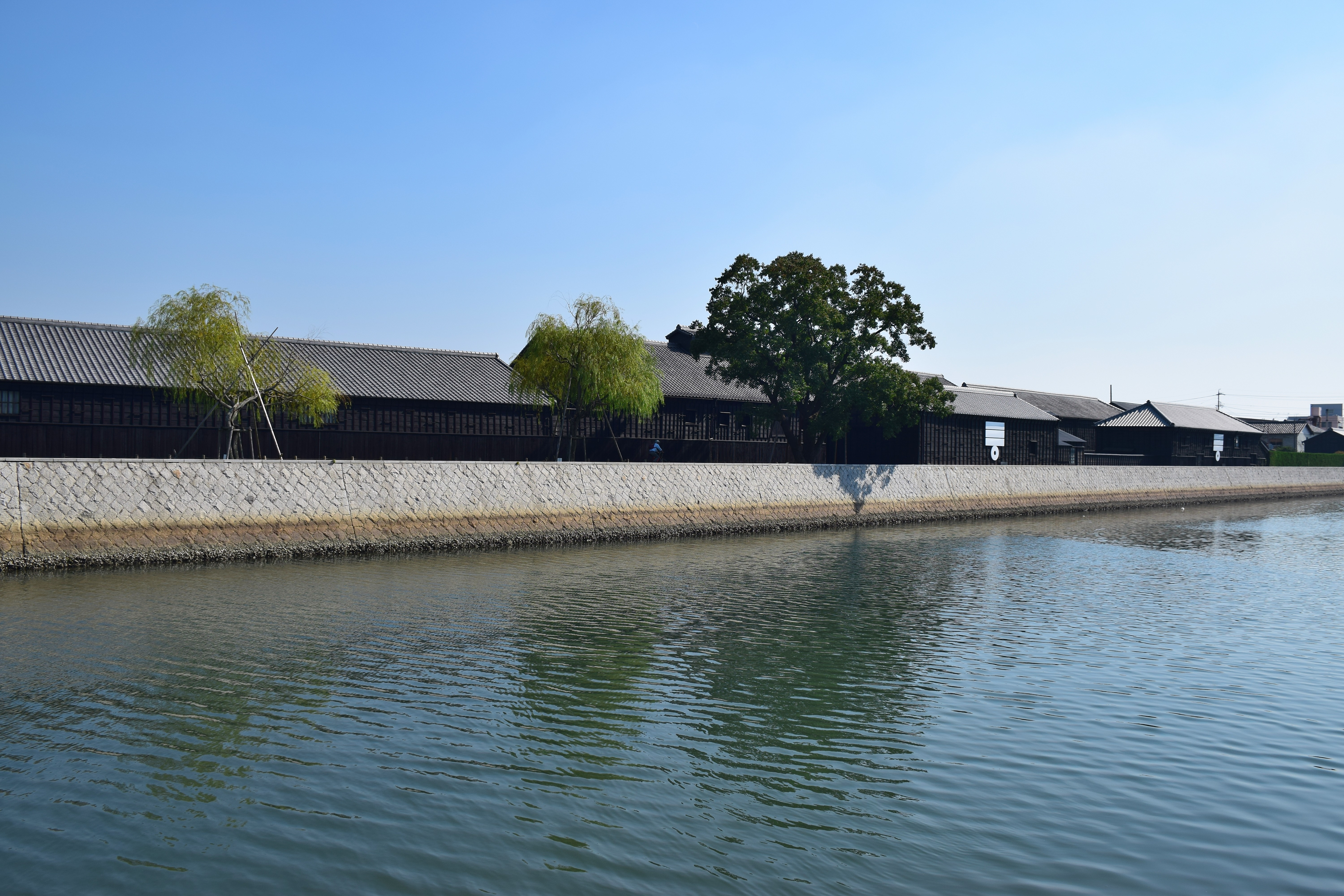
Handa canal

- CLACITY HANDA
- Handa Red Brick Building
- Jōraku-ji
- Mizkan Museum
- Niimi Nankichi Memorial Museum
- Yakachi River
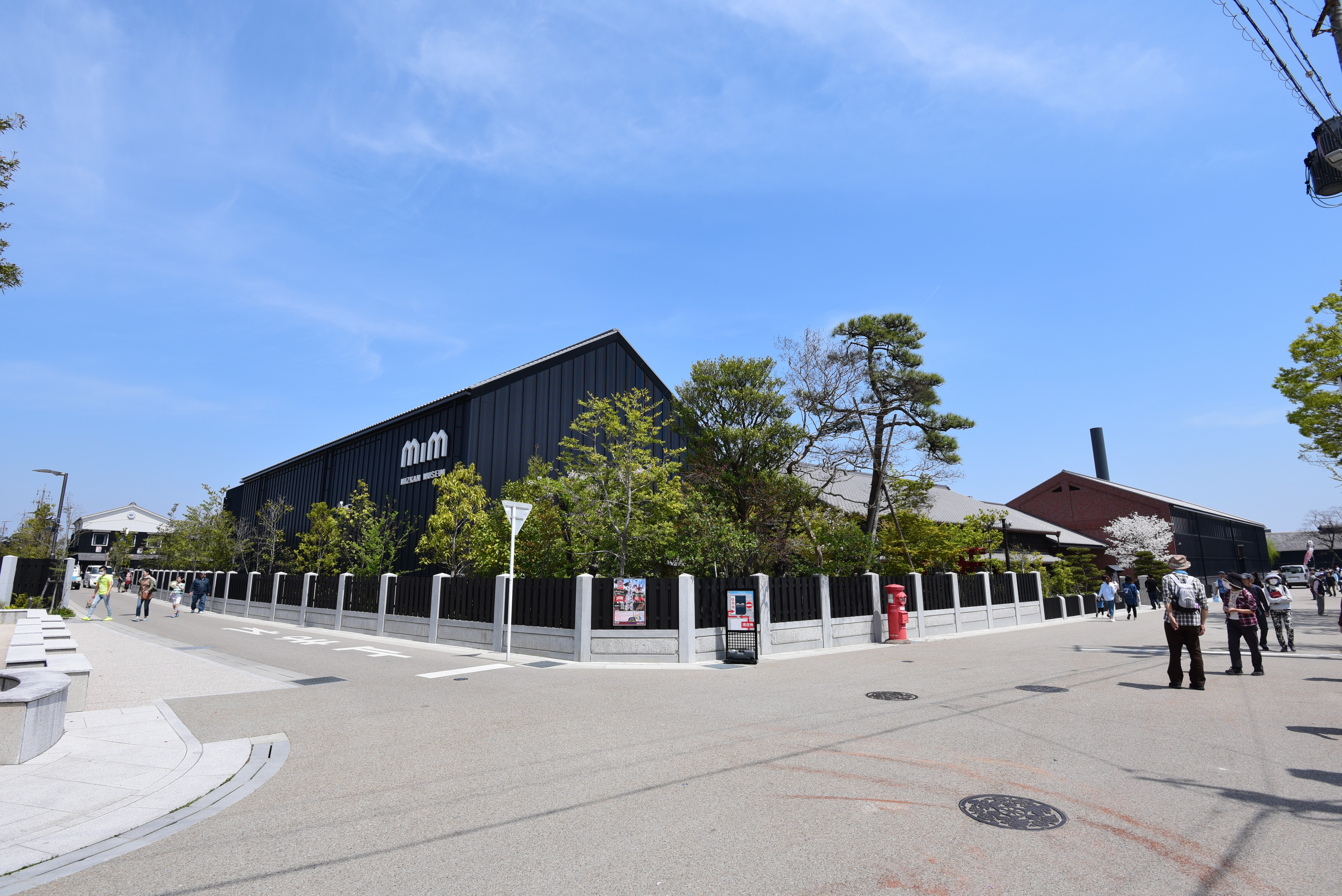
Mizkan Museum

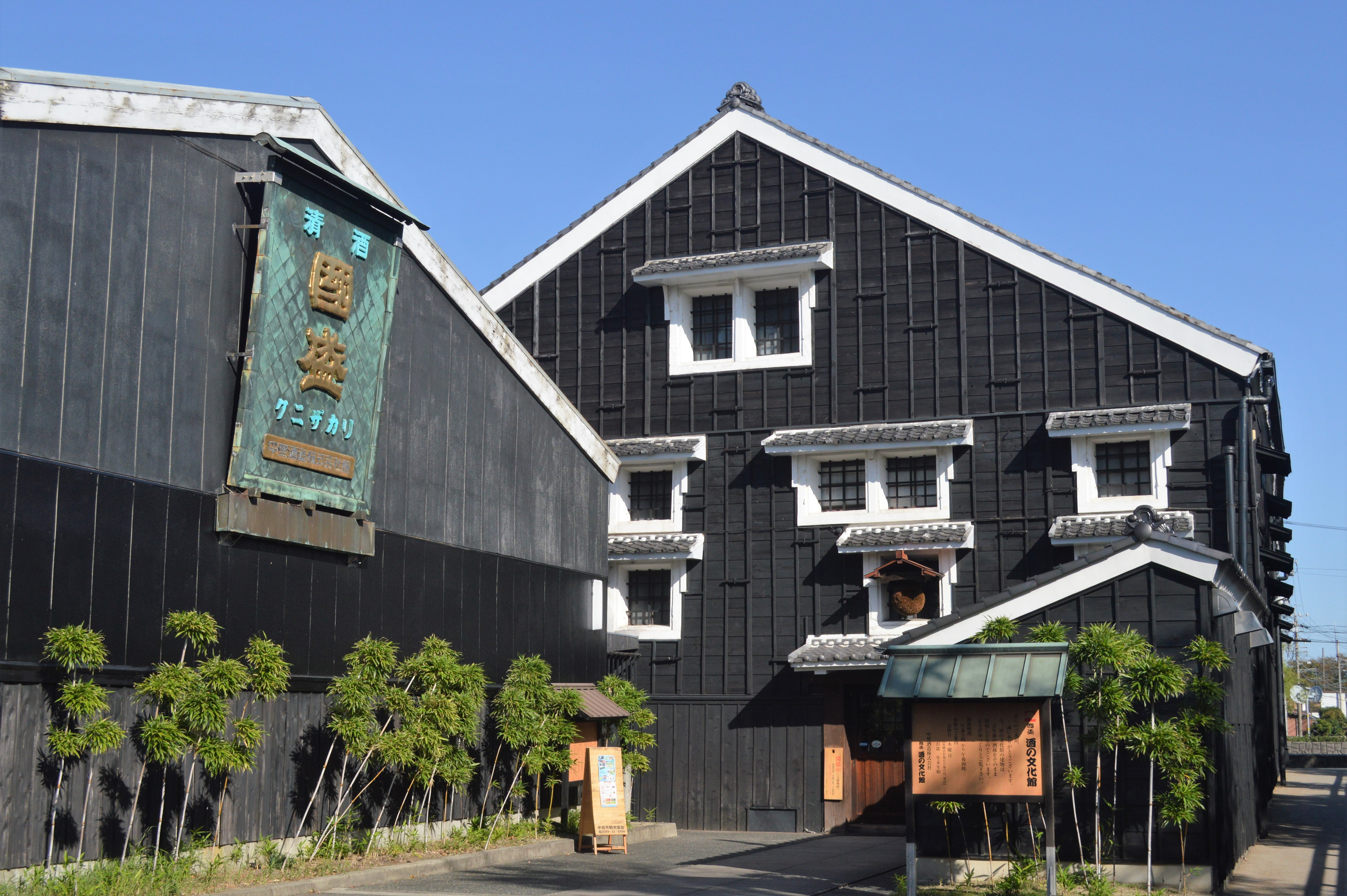
Kunizakari Sake no Bunkakan Museum

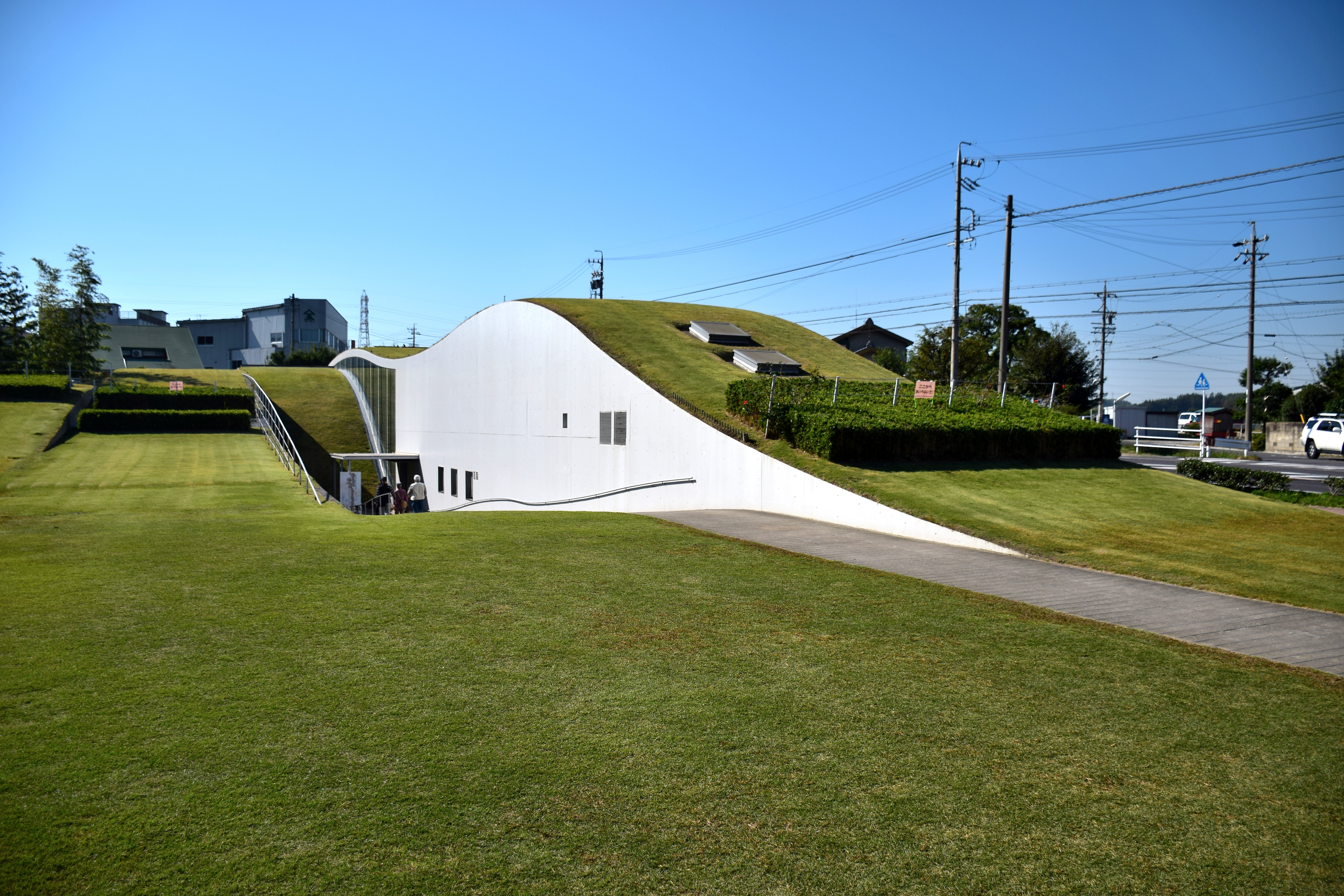
Niimi Nankichi Memorial Museum

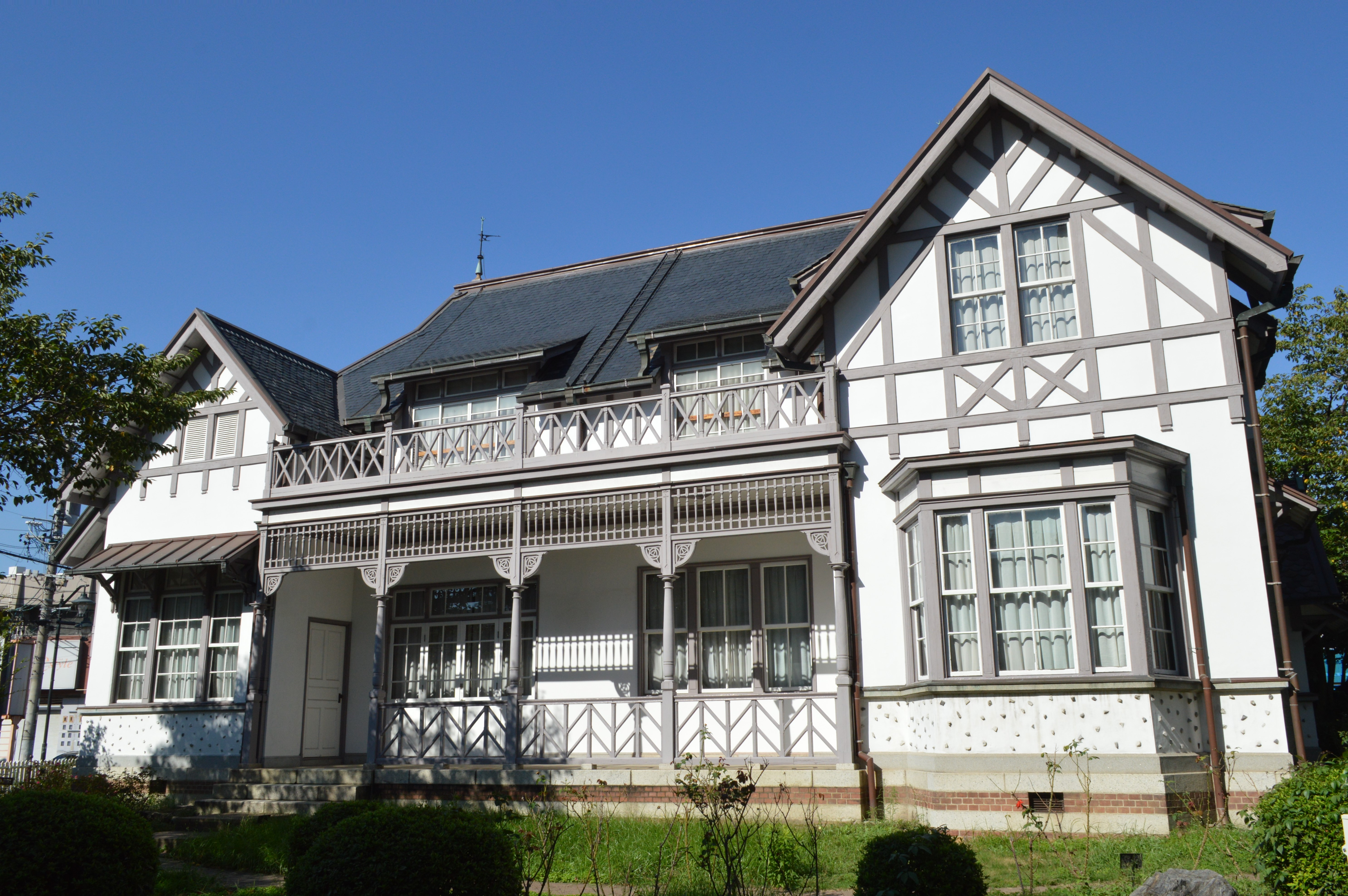
Nakanoke Museum

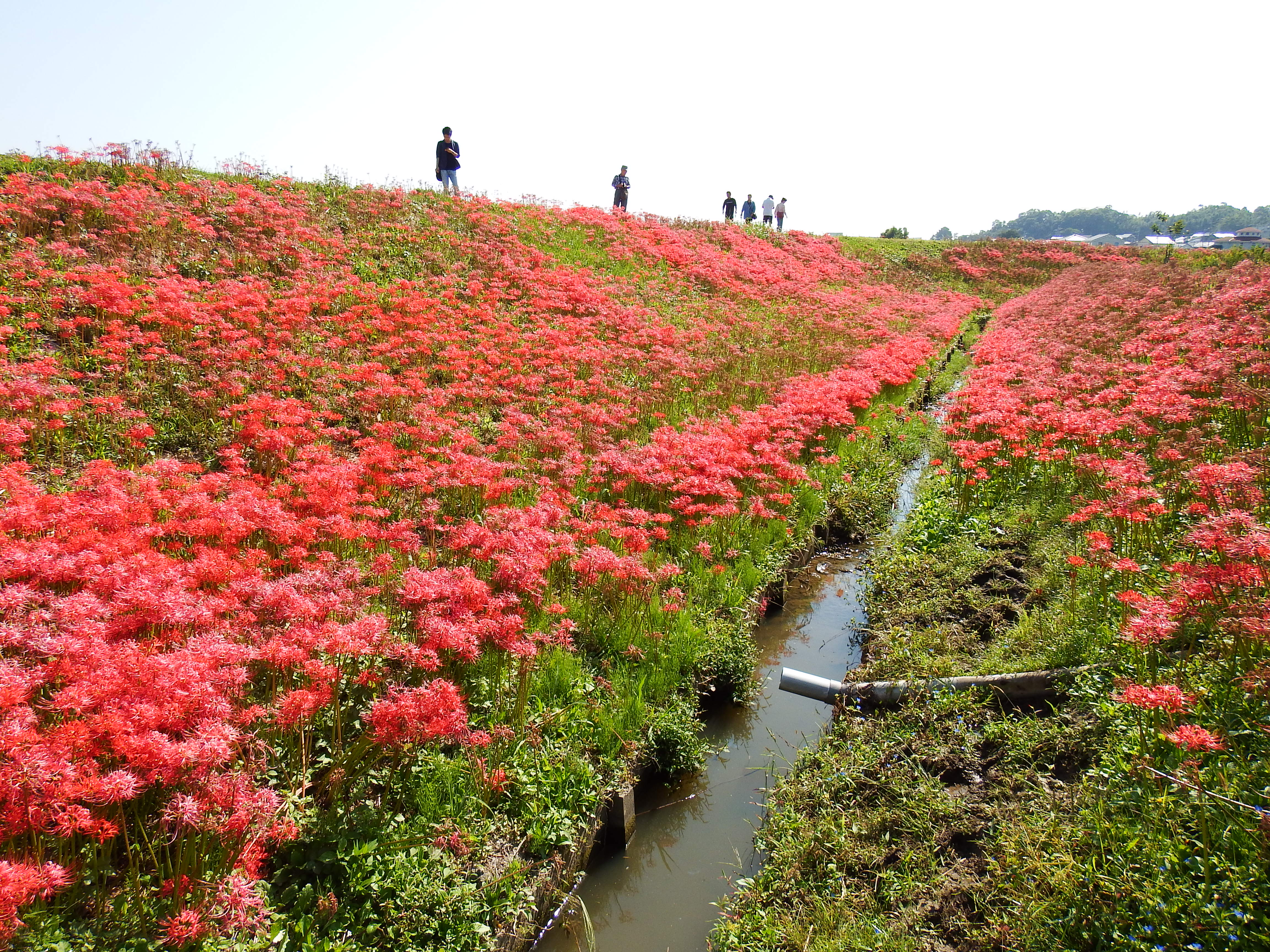
Yakachi River

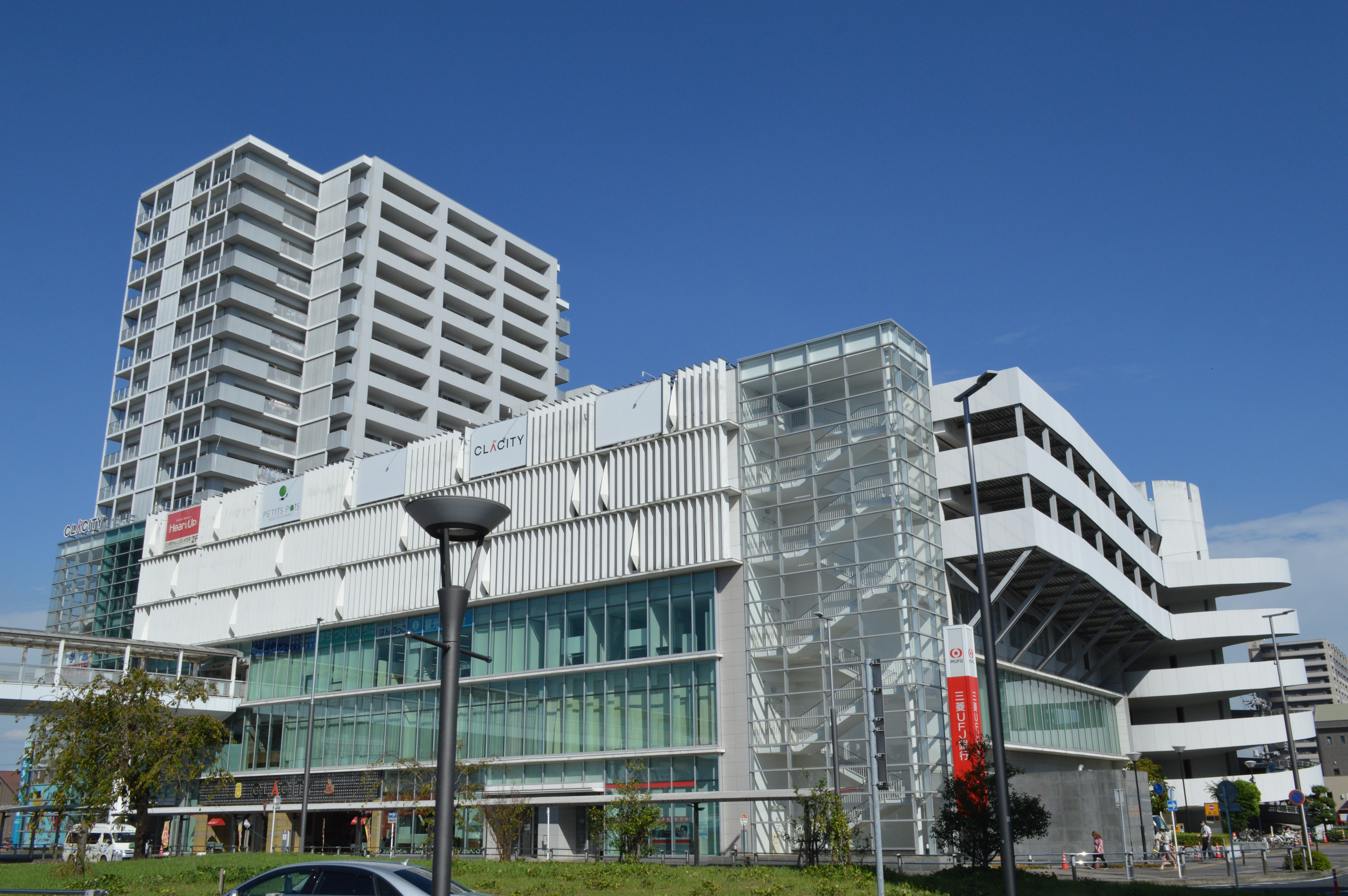
CLACITY HANDA

== Culture ==
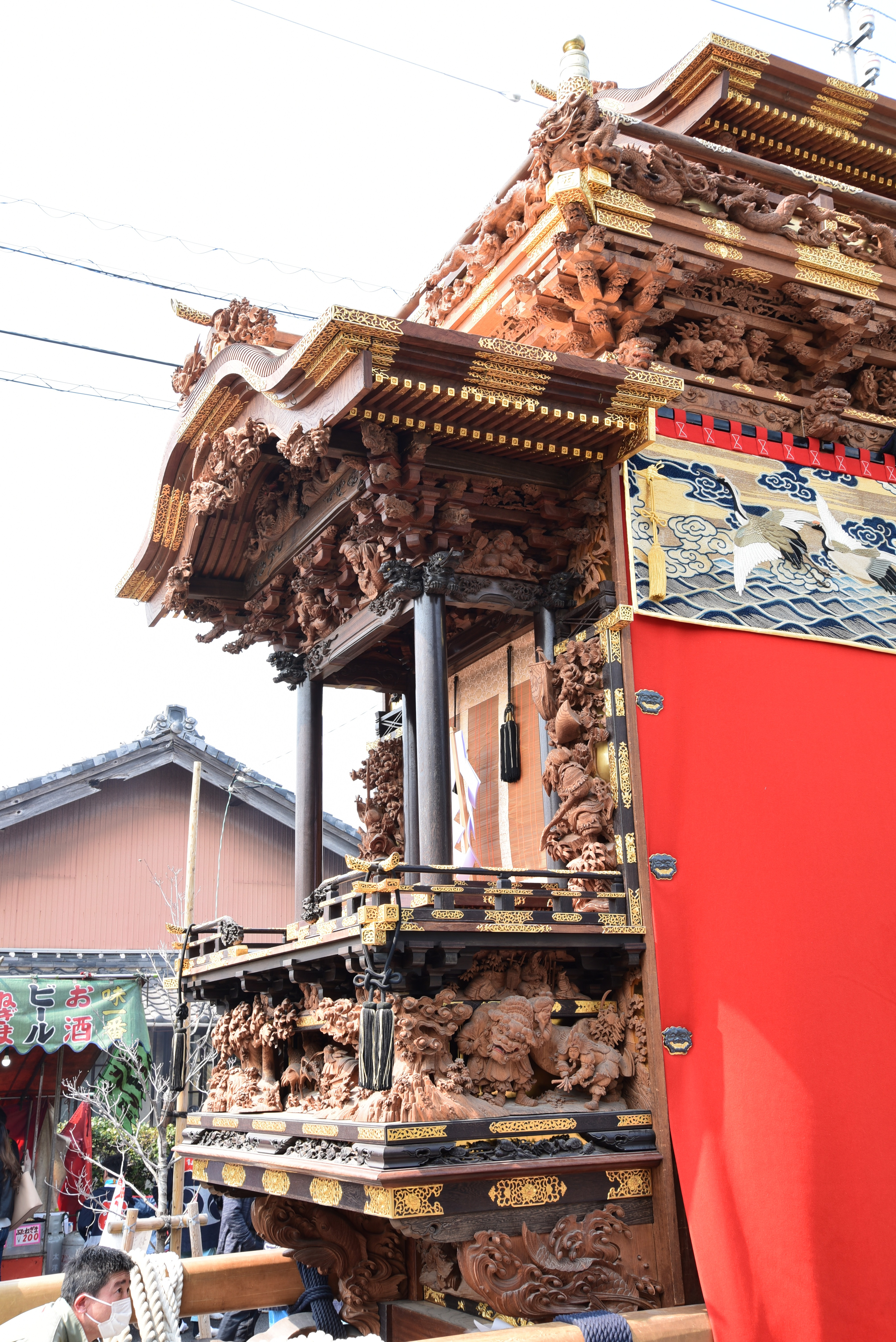
Okkawa Festival

=== Festival ===
- Okkawamatsuri Festival
- Kamesaki Festival
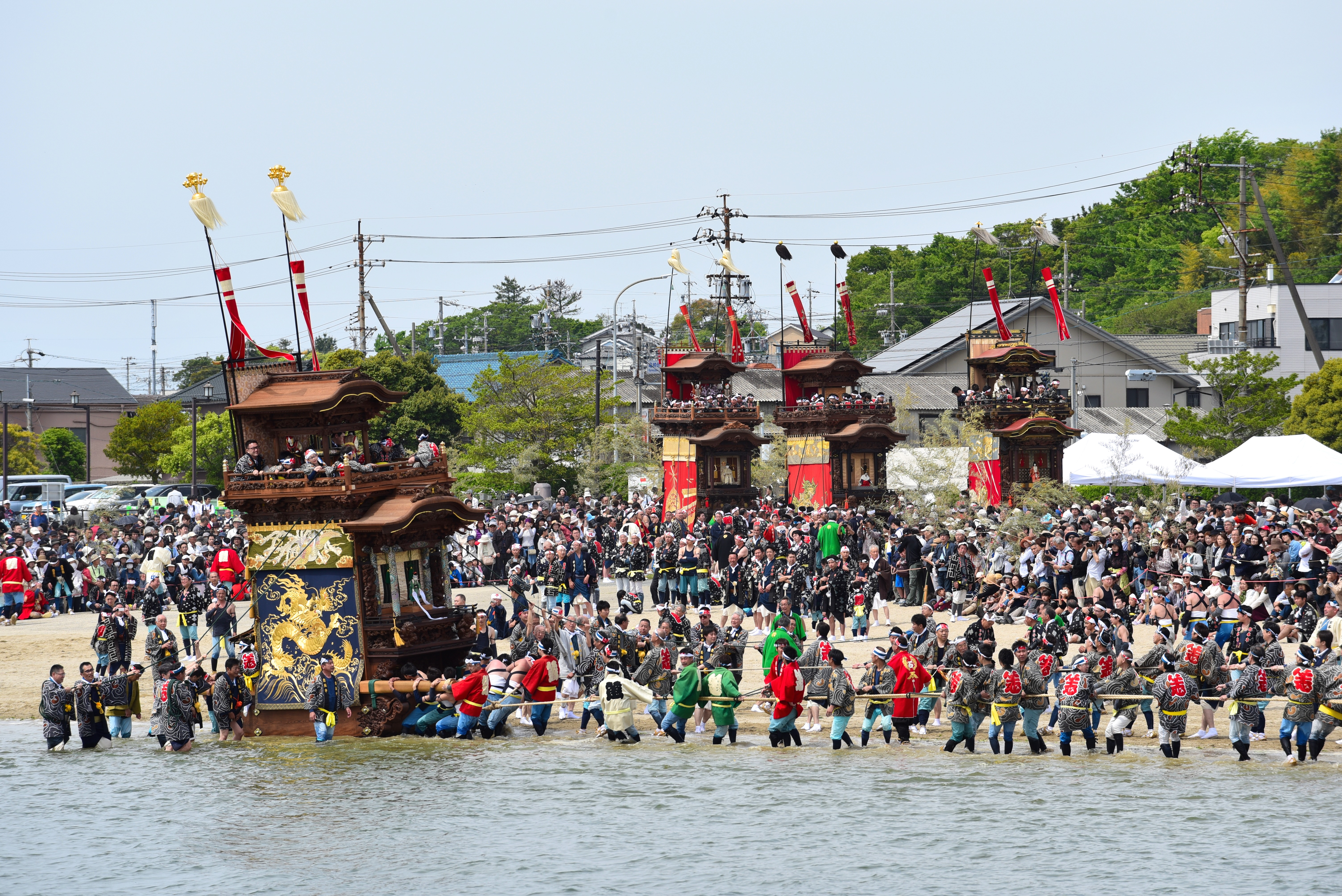
Kamesaki Festival

== Notable people from Handa ==
- Satoru Akahori, author
- Atsushi Harada, actor
- Yusaku Ito, professional wrestler
- Takaya Ishikawa, professional baseball player
- Keiko Lee, jazz singer
- Hiromi Makihara, professional baseball player
- Eiji Mitsuoka, mixed martial artist
- Ōikari Montarō, sumo wrestler
- Nankichi Niimi, author
- Nobuhiro Yamashita, film director
