= Minamichita Road =

Toll road in Aichi Prefecture, Japan

Minamichita Road
- 南知多道路

Route information
- Length: 19.6 km (12.2 mi)
- Existed: 1970–present

Major junctions
- From: Handa Interchange in Handa, Aichi; Chitahantō Road; Aichi Prefectural Route 34
- To: Toyooka Interchange in Minamichita, Aichi; Aichi Prefectural Route 7 Aichi Prefectural Route 280

Location
- Country: Japan

Highway system
- National highways of Japan; Expressways of Japan

The Minamichita Road (南知多道路, Minamichita Dōro) is a 4-laned expressway, toll road in Aichi Prefecture, Japan. It is managed by Aichi Prefectural Road Public Corporation.

== Overview ==
Officially the road is designated as Aichi Prefectural Route 7. The road is designated for motor vehicles only (自動車専用道路, Jidōsha Senyō Dōro) (motor vehicles must have a displacement of at least 125 cc), and the design standard of the road is similar to national expressways.

The road connects the southern portion of the Chita Peninsula with Nagoya through the Chitahantō Road. A toll plaza formerly separated these two roads since the Chitahantō Road was administered by Japan Highway Public Corporation, however since the administration of that road was transferred to Aichi Prefectural Road Public Corporation the toll plaza has been abandoned and a unified toll structure has been implemented.

== Interchange list ==
- IC - interchange, PA - parking area

Name	Connections	Dist. from Ōdaka IC	Notes	Location (all in Aichi)
Through to Chitahantō Road
Handa IC	Pref. Route 34 (Handa Tokoname Route)	20.9		Handa
Taketoyo IC/ PA*	Pref. Route 71 (Taketoyo Kosugaya Route)	26.5	PA: Handa-bound only	Taketoyo
Mihama PA		↓	Toyooka-bound only	Mihama
Mihama IC	Pref. Route 274 (Kosugaya Kōwa Route)	31.3		Mihama
Minamichita IC	Pref. Route 52 (Handa Minamichita Route)	35.5		Mihama
Toyooka Toll Gate		↓		Mihama
Kō IC		37.4	Toyooka-bound exit, Handa-bound entrance only	Mihama
Toyooka IC	Pref. Route 280 (Toyooka Toyohama Route)	40.5		Minamichita
Expressway ends, road continues as Pref. Route 7

*=Majority of the facility closed on November 11 2018, only vending machines and portable toilet is available.
