= Cheat (disambiguation) =

A cheat is someone who engages in cheating.

Cheat may also refer to:

== Places ==
- Cheat River, a tributary of the Monongahela River in West Virginia, the United States
  - Cheat Lake, a reservoir on the Cheat River
  - Cheat Mountain, one of the highest mountains in the Alleghenies

== Games or gaming ==
- Cheat (game), a card game
- A cheat code, a hidden means of gaining an advantage in a computer or video game
- Cheat, an alternate term for defection in the prisoner's dilemma in game theory

== Film and TV ==
- The Cheat (1912 film), an Australian silent film directed by Alfred Rolfe
- The Cheat (1915 film), a Cecil B. DeMille film
- The Cheat (1923 film), a silent film produced by Famous Players–Lasky
- The Cheat (1931 film), a remake of the 1915 film starring Tallulah Bankhead
- The Cheat (1936 film), alternative title of Sacha Guitry's Confessions of a Cheat
- The Cheat (1937 film), a French drama film
- Cheats (film), a 2002 comedy film starring Matthew Lawrence and Mary Tyler Moore
- The Cheat, a character from Homestar Runner
- Cheat!, a television show on the G4 network
- Cheat (game show), a Netflix game show
- Cheat, a 2019 television series starring Katherine Kelly and Molly Windsor

== Music ==
- "Cheat", a song by The Clash from the UK version of their album The Clash
- Cheats (band), a Filipino band

== Other uses ==
- Cheat lines, decorative, horizontal, single or multiple, bands of color applied to both sides of an aircraft's fuselage
- Cheat sheet, cheatsheet, or crib sheet, a concise set of notes used for quick reference
- Drooping Brome, a European grass sometimes called "cheat"

== See also ==
- Cheetah (disambiguation)
- Cheater (disambiguation)
- Cheating (disambiguation)
