= Chitaōdan Road =

Road in Aichi Prefecture, Japan

知多横断道路 Chitaōdan Road
- 知多横断道路

Route information
- Length: 8.5 km (5.3 mi)
- Existed: 2005–present

Major junctions
- From: Handa-Chūō Junction in Handa, Aichi; Chitahantō Road; Aichi Prefectural Route 265
- To: Rinkū Interchange in Tokoname, Aichi; Chubu International Airport Connecting Road; Aichi Prefectural Route 522

Location
- Country: Japan

Highway system
- National highways of Japan; Expressways of Japan

The Chitaōdan Road (知多横断道路, Chitaōdan Dōro, lit. 'trans-Chita Road') is a 4-laned toll road in Aichi, Japan. It is managed by Aichi Prefectural Road Public Corporation.

== Overview ==
Officially the road is designated as Aichi Prefectural Route 265 (Handa-Chūō Junction to Tokoname Interchange) and Aichi Prefectural Route 522 (Tokoname Interchange to Rinkū Interchange). Together with the Chubu International Airport Connecting Road, it is also referred to as the Centrair Line to indicate its status as the access road for Chubu Centrair International Airport.

The road is designated as for motor vehicles only (自動車専用道路, Jidōsha Senyō Dōro), i.e., motor vehicles must have a displacement of at least 125 cc. The design standard of the road is similar to most national expressways in Japan.

== Interchange list ==
- IC - interchange, JCT - junction

Name	Connections	Dist. from Origin	Notes	Location (all in Aichi)
Handa-Chūō IC/ JCT	Chitahantō Road; Pref. Route 265 (Hekinan Handa Tokoname Route)	0.0		Handa
Tokoname IC	Pref. Route 265 (Hekinan Handa Tokoname Route); Pref. Route 522 (Chubu International Airport Route)	5.0	Rinkū-bound exit, Handa-bound entrance only	Tokoname
Rinkū IC	Pref. Route 522 (Chubu International Airport Route)	8.5		Tokoname
Through to Chubu International Airport Connecting Road
