= Chitahantō Road =

Toll road in Aichi Prefecture, Japan

Chitahantō Road
- 知多半島道路

Route information
- Length: 20.9 km (13.0 mi)
- Existed: 1970–present

Major junctions
- From: Ōdaka Interchange in Midori-ku, Nagoya; Nagoya Expressway Ōdaka Route; National Route 23
- To: Handa Interchange in Handa, Aichi; Minamichita Road; Aichi Prefectural Route 34

Location
- Country: Japan
- Major cities: Ōbu

Highway system
- National highways of Japan; Expressways of Japan

The Chitahantō Road (知多半島道路, Chitahantō Dōro) (lit. Chita Peninsula Road) is a 4-laned toll road in Aichi Prefecture, Japan. It is managed by Aichi Prefectural Road Public Corporation.

== Overview ==
A portion of the road was opened to traffic in 1970 and the entire road was completed in 1971. The road was originally built by Japan Highway Public Corporation and management was transferred to Aichi Prefectural Road Public Corporation in 1983.

Officially the road is designated as Aichi Prefectural Route 55. The road is designated for motor vehicles only (自動車専用道路, Jidōsha Senyō Dōro) (motor vehicles must have a displacement of at least 125 cc), and the design standard of the road is similar to national expressways.

The road is an important route connecting Chubu International Airport with central Nagoya. In 2005 a junction was built to connect the Chitahantō Road to the newly constructed airport through the Chitaōdan Road.

== Interchange list ==
- IC - interchange, JCT - junction, PA - parking area

Name	Connections	Dist. from Origin	Notes	Location (all in Aichi)
Ōdaka IC	Nagoya Expressway Ōdaka Route; National Route 23 (Meishi Highway)	0.0		Midori-ku, Nagoya
Ōbu-nishi IC	Isewangan Expressway (Ōbu IC); National Route 302	2.6	Nagoya-bound exit, Handa-bound entrance only	Ōbu
Ōdaka Toll Gate		↓		Ōbu
Ōbu PA		↓		Ōbu
Ōbu Tōkai IC	National Route 155	7.2		Ōbu
Higashiura Chita IC	Pref. Route 23 (Higashiura Nagoya Route)	10.3		Higashiura
Agui IC	Pref. Route 46 (Nishio Chita Route)	14.0		Agui
Agui PA		↓	Handa-bound only	Agui
Handa-Chūō IC/ JCT	Chitaōdan Road; Pref. Route 265 (Hekinan Handa Tokoname Route)	19.0		Handa
Handa IC	Pref. Route 34 (Handa Tokoname Route)	20.9		Handa
Through to Minamichita Road

== Passing municipalities ==
- Aichi prefecture
  - Midori-ku, Nagoya - Ōbu - Tōkai - Higashiura - Agui - Handa
