= WinFiles =

Internet download directory

WinFiles, formerly Windows95.com, was an Internet download directory website. Originally, it was founded by Steve Jenkins in 1994.

== CNET buyout ==
On February 24, 1999, CNET agreed to pay WinFiles owner Jenesys LLC US$5.75 million and made an additional $5.75 million payment 18 months after the closing of the deal - totaling $11.5 million.
