= Cheater (disambiguation) =

A cheater is one who engages in cheating, subversion of the rules to obtain an advantage.

Cheater(s) may also refer to:

== Arts and entertainment ==
=== Films ===
- Cheater (film), a 2016 Indian Marathi-language film
- Cheaters (1934 film), an American film
- Cheaters (1984 film) (a/k/a Tricheurs), a French film directed by Barbet Schroeder
- Cheaters (2000 film), a 2000 TV movie
- The Cheater (film), a 1920 lost silent drama
- The Cheaters (1930 film), an Australian silent film
- The Cheaters (1945 film), a Christmas screwball comedy
- The Cheaters (2022 film) (a/k/a Les Tricheurs), a Canadian film directed by Louis Godbout

=== Stories ===
- "Cheater" (short story), a science fiction story from the Ender's Game universe
- "The Cheaters", a short story by Robert Bloch, in the collection Pleasant Dreams: Nightmares

=== Music ===
- "Cheater" (song), a 2004 song by Michael Jackson
- "The Cheater" (song), a 1966 song by Bob Kuban
- Cheater, a 2001 EP by Randy
- "Cheater", a Judas Priest song from Rocka Rolla
- "Cheater" a song by The Vamps from the 2015 album Wake Up
- The Cheater, a 2022 album by Lil Gotit

=== Television ===
- Cheaters (American TV series), a syndicated reality TV show
- Cheaters (British TV series), a BBC sitcom starring Susie Wokoma
- The Cheaters (TV series), a British TV series broadcast 1960–1962
- "Cheaters" (Will & Grace), a two-part episode of Will & Grace
- Cheater, also known as a clip show

== Slang ==
- Cheater, trades jargon for a cheater bar, a wrench extension arm (typically a length of pipe)
- Cheaters, a slang term for reading glasses

== See also ==
- "Cheater, Cheater", a 2008 debut single from country music duo Joey + Rory
- Cheat (disambiguation)
- Cheetah (disambiguation)
- Cheating (disambiguation)
