= Higashiura =

Higashiura 東浦町
- Town
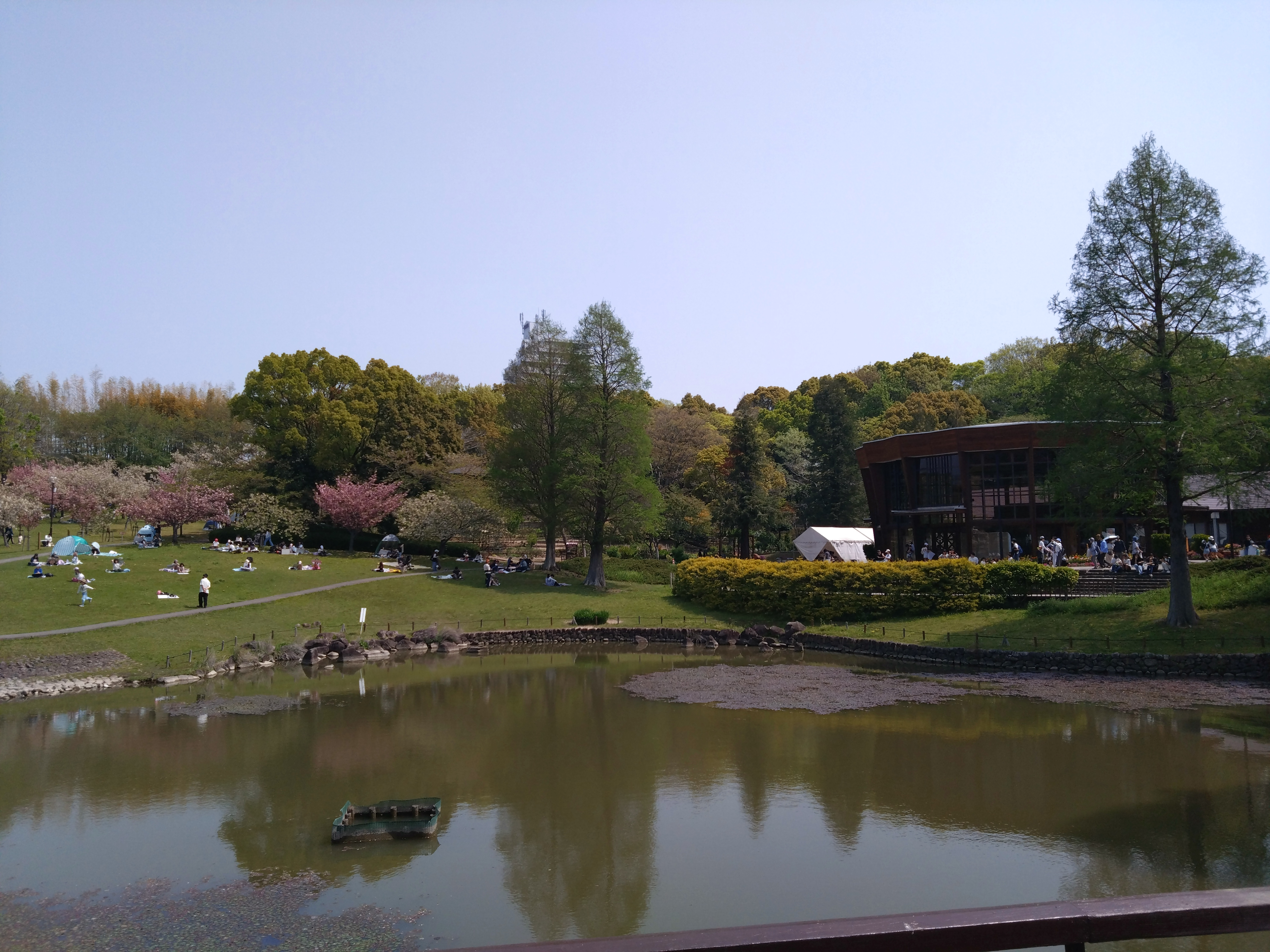
- Odai Park

- Flag Emblem

- Location of Higashiura in Aichi Prefecture

- Coordinates: 34°58′12″N 136°57′22″E
- Country: Japan
- Region: Chūbu region Tōkai region
- Prefecture: Aichi
- District: Chita

Area
  - Total: 31.14 km^{2} (12.02 sq mi)

Population (April 31, 2023)
  - Total: 50,182
  - Density: 1,611/km^{2} (4,174/sq mi)
- Time zone: UTC+9 (Japan Standard Time)
- Tree: Cinnamomum camphora
- Flower: Deutzia crenata
- Phone number: 0562-83-3111
- Address: Higashiura-chō, Chita-gun, Aichi-ken 470-2192
- Website: Official website

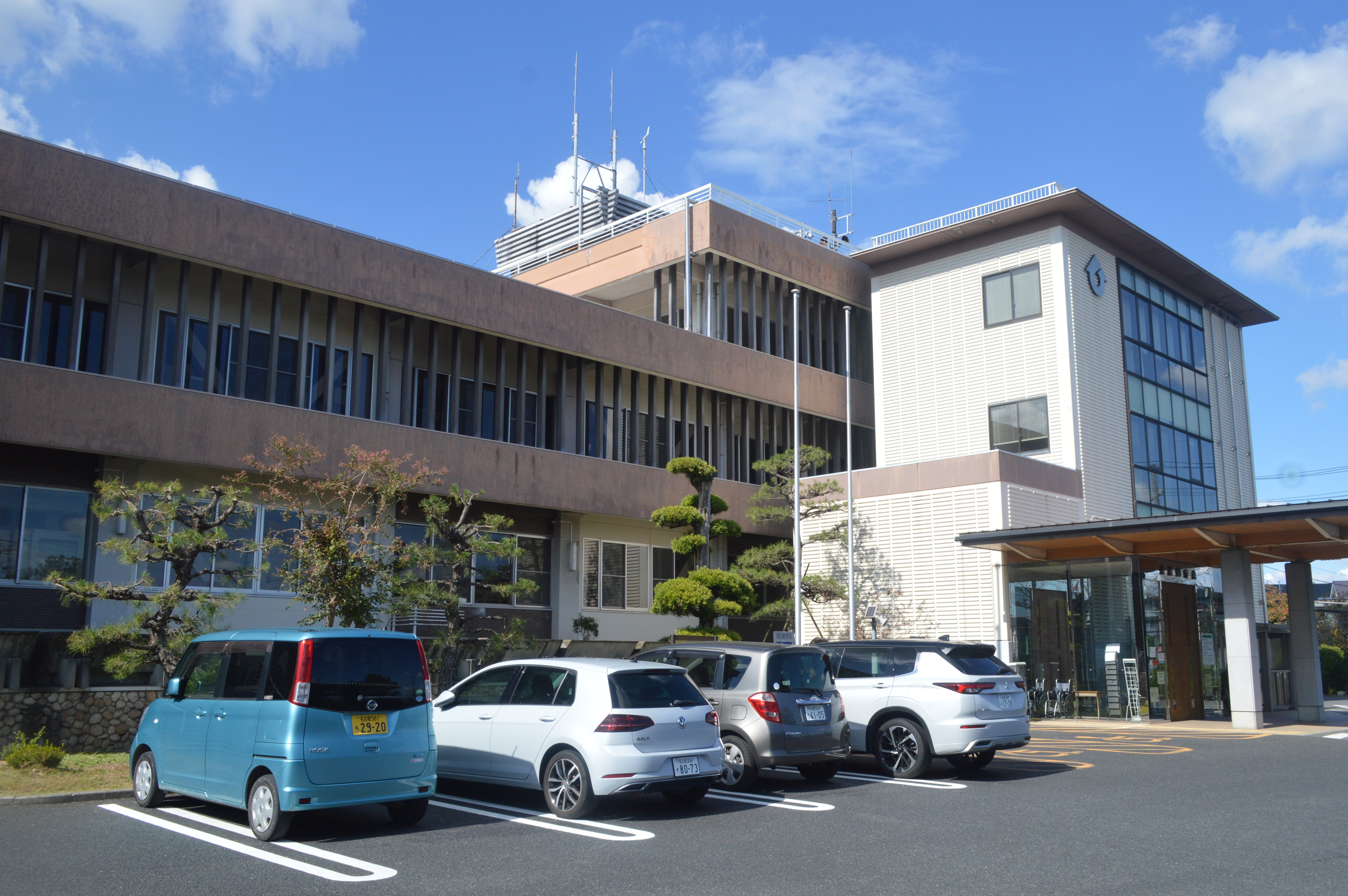
Higashiura Town Hall

Higashiura (東浦町, Higashiura-chō) is a town located in Chita District, Aichi Prefecture, Japan. On 31 April 2023, the town had an estimated population of 50,182 in 21,426 households, and a population density of 1,611 per square kilometre (4,170/sq mi). This makes the town the most populous town in Aichi Prefecture, surpassing Takahama, Iwakura in population. The town is also the second most populous town in Japan, being surpassed by Fuchū, Hiroshima. The total area was 31.14 square kilometres (12.02 sq mi).

== Geography ==
Higashiura is located in the northern tip of Chita Peninsula in southern Aichi Prefecture.

=== Neighboring municipalities ===
- Aichi Prefecture
  - Agui
  - Chita
  - Handa
  - Kariya
  - Ōbu
  - Takahama
  - Tōkai

== Demographics ==
Per Japanese census data, the population of Higashiura has been increasing steadily over the past 70 years, hitting 50,000 in 2020.

In the 2010 census, a data padding boosting the population count to 50,088 was found, and the population count was readjusted back to 49,800 population.

Historical population
| Year | Pop. | ±% |
|---|---|---|
| 1940 | 12,017 | — |
| 1950 | 16,173 | +34.6% |
| 1960 | 20,425 | +26.3% |
| 1970 | 24,550 | +20.2% |
| 1980 | 36,035 | +46.8% |
| 1990 | 40,430 | +12.2% |
| 2000 | 45,168 | +11.7% |
| 2010 | 49,800 | +10.3% |
| 2020 | 50,163 | +0.7% |

=== Climate ===
The town has a climate characterized by hot and humid summers, and relatively mild winters (Köppen climate classification Cfa). The average annual temperature in Higashiura is 15.7 °C. The average annual rainfall is 1604 mm with September as the wettest month. The temperatures are highest on average in August, at around 27.6 °C, and lowest in January, at around 4.4 °C.

== History ==
The area around Higashiura has been settled since prehistoric times, and archaeologists have uncovered Jōmon period shell middens dating approximately 7000 BC.

=== Middle ages and Early modern period ===
In the Sengoku period, the area was under the control of the Mizuno clan and was the birthplace of the mother of Tokugawa Ieyasu. In the Edo period, it was part of the holdings of Owari Domain.

=== Late modern period ===
The village of Higashiura was established on May 1, 1906, through the merger of five hamlets, Ogawa, parts of Morioka, Ishihama, Fujie, Ikuji, all within Chita District. It was elevated to town status on June 1, 1948. But later in future, they will be elevated city. The Fujie station and Owari-Ikuji station was abolished and merged to create Higashiura Station.

=== Contemporary history ===
In 1971, Higashiura changed borders with Ōbu. The “Road of Odai” finishes construction in 1994, and the first Odai Matsuri is held in the town.

==== Problems surrounding elevation to city status ====
In February 2012, after the town gave up attempting to be elevated to city status, there were doubts about potential data padding over population counts. In December 2010, there were anonymous mails prosectuting data padding to Ministry of Internal Affairs and Communications. The town was preparing to be elevated to city status as their population count was about to hit 50,000 which was the criteria to be elevated to city status. The population count in the 2010 census was 50,082. However, after re-examination by the Ministry of Internal Affairs and Communications, the revised population count was 49,800 so the elevation to the city status was postponed. Later in, in the 2015 census, the population count was 49,238, being less than the 50,000 required to be elevated into city status, so the elevation was again postponed.

== Government ==
Higashiura has a Mayor–council form of government with a directly elected mayor and a unicameral town legislature of 16 members.

Mayor
| Order | Name | Date appointed | Date resigned |
|---|---|---|---|
| 1 | Shin Mizuno | 8 April 1947 | 30 April 1957 |
| 2 | Iwakichi Hidaka | 1 May 1957 | 30 April 1969 |
| 3 | Saburō Nagasaka | 1 May 1969 | 30 April 1973 |
| 4 | Etsuji Nagasaka | 1 May 1973 | 7 July 1979 |
| 5 | Tokuhika Imura | 19 August 1979 | 18 August 2011 |
| 6 | Akihiko Kamiya | 19 August 2011 | 18 August 2023 |
| 7 | Teruo Hidaka | August 19, 2023 | In service |

== External relations ==
=== Twin towns - Sister cities ===
==== National ====
- (Japan) Shinshiro (Aichi Prefecture, Chūbu region)
  - Since 1984

== Economy ==
Higashiura is a regional commercial center and a bedroom community for Nagoya.

=== Primary sector of the economy ===
==== Agriculture ====
- Vineyards

Grapes are produced in the town since the 1960s.

=== Secondary sector of the economy ===
==== Manufacturing ====
- Automobile manufacturing

=== Tertiary sector of the economy ===
==== Commercial facilities ====
- AEON mall Higashiura
- Kohnan Chita-Higashiura
- Genky Higashiura
  - Both TSUTAYA and EDION Corporation had a store in Higashiura, but has closed in early 2023.

== Education ==
Higashiura has seven public elementary schools and three public junior high schools operated by the town government and one public high school operated by the Aichi Prefectural Board of Education.

=== High school ===
- Higashiura High School

=== Junior high schools ===
- Higashiura Junior High School
- Hokubu Junior High School
- Seibu Junior High School

=== Elementary schools ===
- Fujie Elementary School
- Ikuji Elementary School
- Ishihama-Nishi Elementary School
- Kataha Elementary School
- Morioka Elementary School
- Ogawa Elementary School
- Unosato Elementary School

== Transportation ==
The Taketoyo Line goes through the eastern part of the town, with the National Route 366 running alongside it. Higashiura-Chita IC is located in the west of the town.

=== Railway ===
Central Japan Railway Company - Taketoyo Line

- Owari-Morioka - Ogawa - Ishihama - Higashiura
  - The route of the Tōkaidō Main Line passes through the northeast of Higashiura, but no stations are located within the town.

=== Highway ===
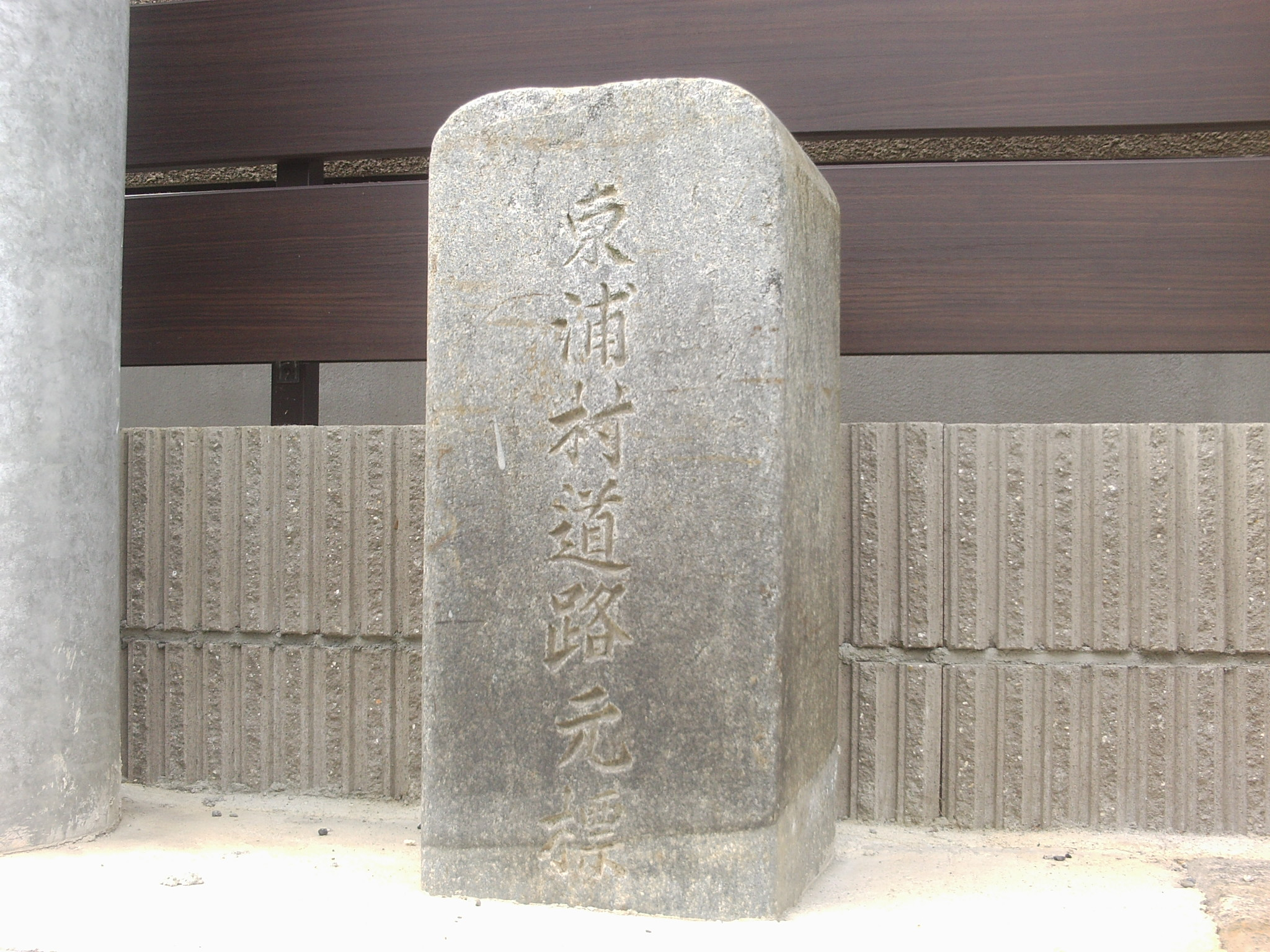
The Kilometre Zero of Higashiura

- Chitahantō Road
- National Route 336
  - Handa-Ōbu Bypass

=== Buses ===
==== Chita Bus(Chita Noriai) ====
- Kariya-Central Japan International Airport Route
  - Chubu Centrair International Airport - Ogawa - Kariya - Chiryū
- Higashigaoka-Danchi Route
  - Tatsumigaoka - Higashigaoka - Takane
- Ōbu Circle Route
  - West Ōbu station - Aichi Health Plaza - Gēnki No Sato/Moriokadai

==== U.ra.ra ====
Community bus which began operation in 2001. The routes in operation are Kariya, Cyōjyu, Higashigaoka, Hiraikedai. The fares are 100 yen per ride, with children under 6 years of age being able to ride for free.

== Local attractions ==
- Odai Matsuri - held annually in April, Daimyo parades of Mizuno clan take place around the "Road of Odai" along the Myoutokuji river.
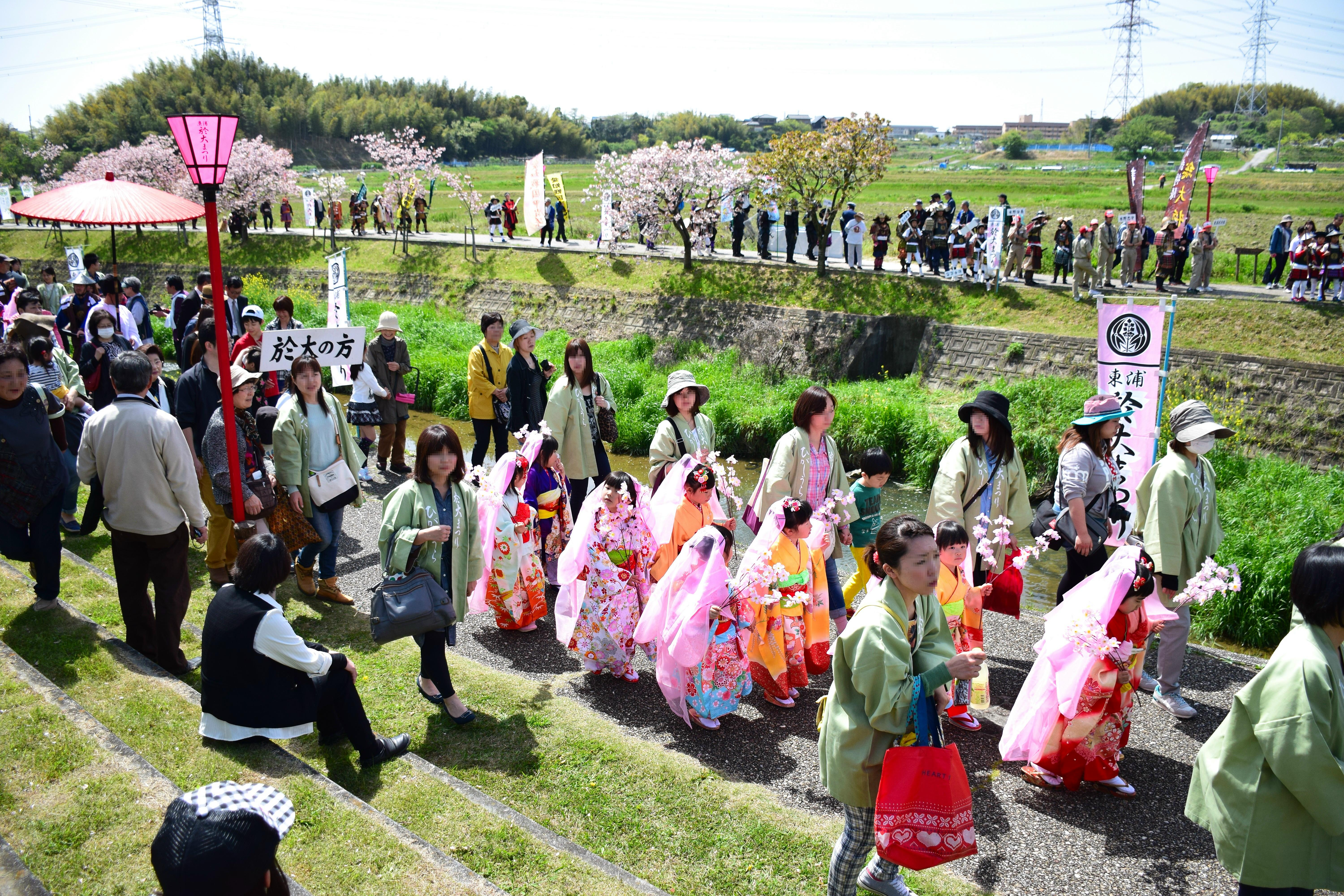
Odai Matsuri

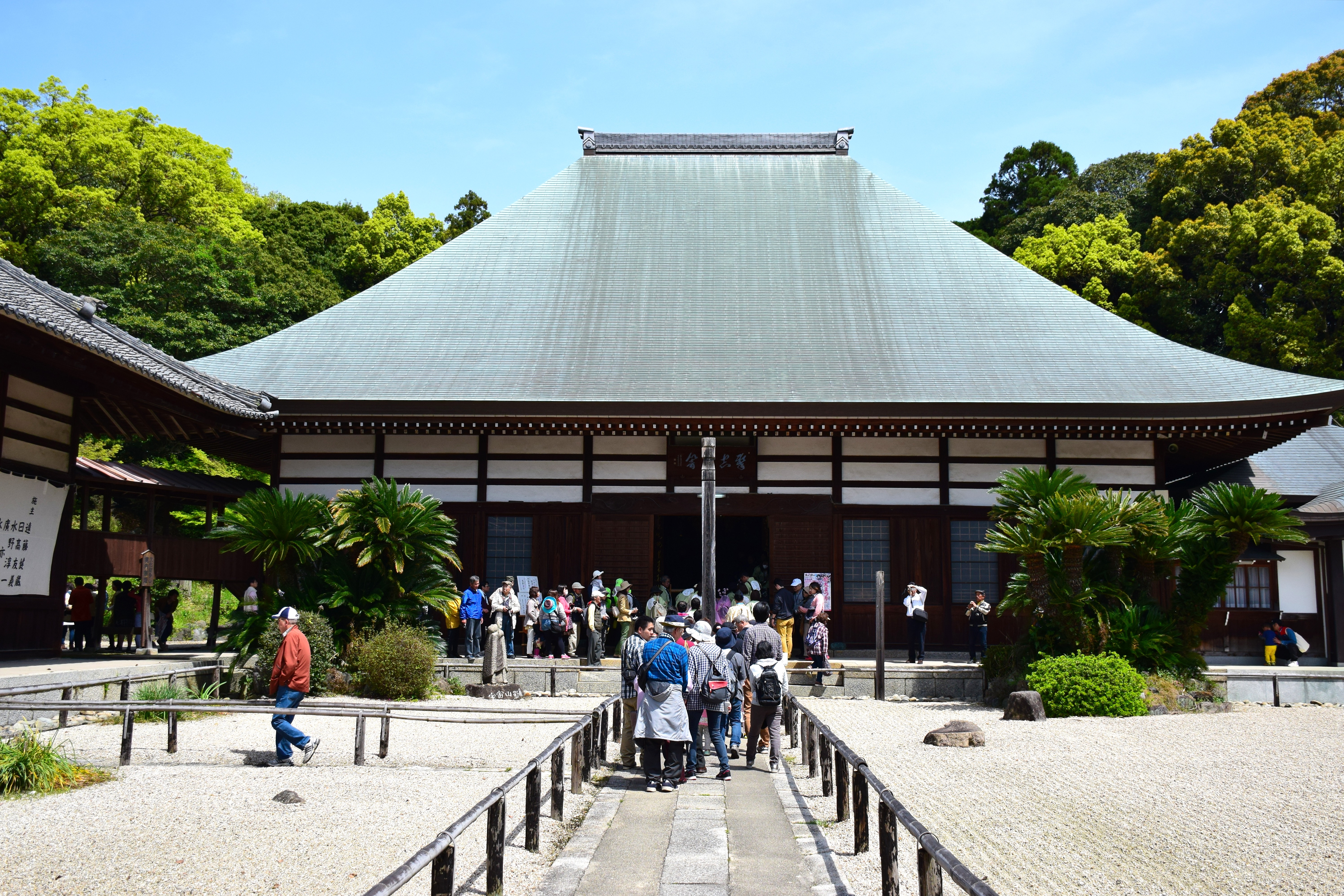
Kenkon-in

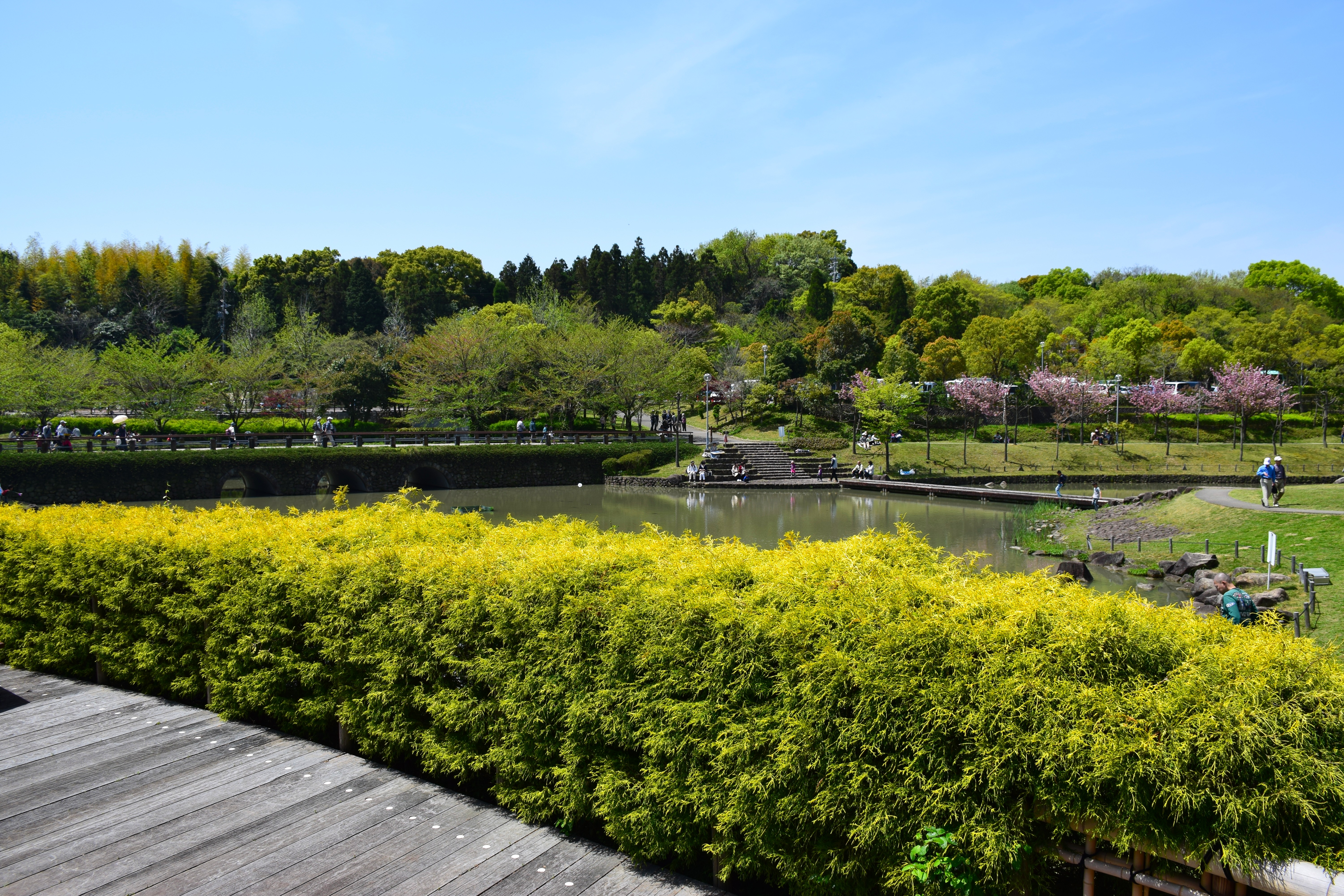
Odai Park

== Notable people from Higashiura ==
Odai no Kata, mother of Tokugawa Ieyasu
