= Chita Smedberg =

Finnish sailor

Personal information
- Birth name: Chita Charlotta Maria Smedberg
- Nationality: Finnish
- Born: 2 December 1971 (age 53); Helsinki, Finland
- Height: 161 cm (5 ft 3 in)
- Weight: 56 kg (123 lb; 8 st 11 lb)

Sport
- Sport: Sailing

Chita Charlotta Maria Smedberg (born 2 December 1971) is a Finnish sailor. She competed in the 1992 Summer Olympics and the 1996 Summer Olympics.
