= Cheating (disambiguation) =

Cheating is an immoral way of achieving a goal.

Cheating or Cheatin' may also refer to:

- Cheating (biology), a metaphor used in behavioral ecology to describe organisms that receive a benefit at the cost of other organisms
- Cheating (law), a specific criminal offence relating to property
- Cheating, a synonym of infidelity, used to describe adultery
- Cheatin' (film), 2013
- "Cheating", a 2005 Series C episode of the television series QI
- "Cheatin'" (song), a 2006 single by Sara Evans
- "Cheating" (song), a 2013 song by John Newman

== See also ==
- Cheating, Inc., a 1991 short silent film about students cheating
- Cheat (disambiguation)
- Cheater (disambiguation)
