= Cheetah (disambiguation) =

The cheetah (Acinonyx jubatus) is the fastest of all land animals, and a member of the family Felidae.

Cheetah or Cheeta may also refer to:

== Animals ==
- American cheetah, a prehistoric genus of big cats
- Argina amanda, a moth in the family Erebidae also known as the cheetah
- Cheeta, a chimpanzee appearing in numerous Tarzan movies

== Arts, entertainment, and media ==
=== Films ===
- Cheetah (1989 film), a Disney film
- Cheetah (1994 film), a Hindi-language Indian film by Harmesh Malhotra
- Cheetah: The Power of One, Hindi title of the 2005 Indian Telugu-language film Athadu

=== Music ===
- Cheetah (band), an Australian rock band
- Cheetah (rapper), a South Korean rapper
- Cheetah (EP), a 2016 EP by Aphex Twin
- Cheetah, a 2019 song by Chris Brown from Indigo
- Cheetah Records, a record label

=== Other uses in arts, entertainment, and media ===
- Cheetah (magazine), an early rock music journal
- Cheetah, a character in the Canadian-produced sitcom Learning the Ropes
- Cheetah (character), a supervillain from DC Comics
- Cheetah (Wild Adventures), a wooden roller coaster at Wild Adventures in Georgia, United States

== Automobiles ==
- Bill Thomas Cheetah, a US sports car developed by the Bill Thomas Motorsports company
- Cheetah MMPV, an armored fighting vehicle
- Cheetah Racing Cars, Australian race cars manufactured in the 1960s, 1970s, and 1980s
- Flakpanzer Gepard, or anti-aircraft cannon tank Cheetah
- Lamborghini Cheetah, a large 4×4 off-road prototype

== Aviation ==
- Armstrong Siddeley Cheetah, an aircraft engine used during World War II
- Atlas Cheetah, a South African military aircraft
- Avian Cheetah, a British hang glider
- Grumman American AA-5A Cheetah, a model of the Grumman American AA-5 light general aviation aircraft
- HAL Cheetah, an Indian version of the Aérospatiale Lama light helicopter
- Rainbow Cheetah, a South African ultralight aircraft

== Brands and enterprises ==
- Cheetah (nightclub), a 1960s New York club frequented by Jimi Hendrix
- Cheetah Marketing, a UK-based computer hardware and musical equipment company
- Cheetah Mobile, a Chinese mobile internet company, developers of the live.me app and others
- Cheetah Power Surge, a brand of energy drink produced by D'Angelo Brands
- Cheetah's, a Las Vegas nightclub

== Computing and technology ==
- Cheetah3D, a computer graphics program for 3D modeling, animation and rendering
- CheetahTemplate, a Python template engine
- Mac OS X 10.0, an operating system version codenamed "Cheetah"
- Cheetah, a forerunner of the IBM POWER instruction set architecture
- Cheetah, a hard drive made by Seagate Technology
- Cheetah, a robot by the Biomimetic Robotics Lab, part of the Department of Mechanical Engineering, School of Engineering, Massachusetts Institute of Technology
- Cheetah, a robot by Boston Dynamics

== Sports clubs ==
- Cheetahs (rugby union), a South African rugby union franchise based in Bloemfontein, formerly participating in Super Rugby and the Pro14
- Free State Cheetahs, a South African rugby union club based in Bloemfontein, participating in the Currie Cup
- Cheetah F.C., a Ghanaian association football club based in Kasoa

== Weaponry ==
- .22 CHeetah, a custom cartridge
- Beretta Cheetah, a semi-automatic pistol

== See also ==
- Cheater
- Cheater (disambiguation)
- Cheetor, a Transformers character
- Chester Cheetah, a fictional character and the official mascot for Frito-Lay's Cheetos brand snacks
- Chita (disambiguation)
- The Cheetah Girls (disambiguation)
- Cheetos
