= Chita, Republic of Tatarstan =

Rural locality in Piträç District, Tatarstan

Coordinates: 55°43′44″N 49°54′27″E

Chita (Russian: Чита́; Tatar: Чыты [ɕɯˈtɯ]) is a village (selo) in Pestrechinsky District of the Republic of Tatarstan, Russia, situated 18 kilometers (11 mi) east of Pestretsy, the administrative center of the district.

The village is situated on the Myosha River. Chita's population was 555 in 1989 and 499 in 2000; mostly ethnic Tatars (as of 1989). The main occupations of the residents are agriculture and cattle breeding. There is a secondary school, a cultural center, and a mosque in the village.

It was founded during the first half of the 17th century.
