= Chita Peninsula =

Peninsula in Aichi Prefecture, Japan

Coordinates: 34°41′47″N 136°58′25″E

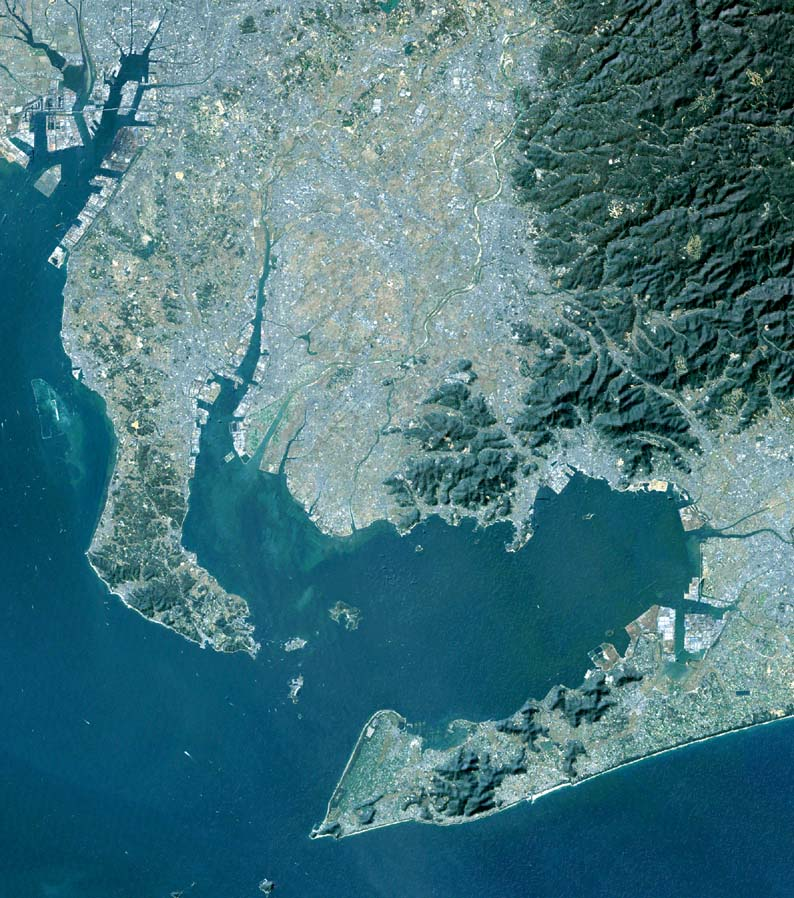
Satellite image of Chita Peninsula (left), Mikawa Bay (center), and Atsumi Peninsula (lower right)

Location (Japan)

Location (Aichi Prefecture)

The Chita Peninsula (知多半島 Chita Hantō) is a peninsula to the south of Aichi Prefecture, central Honshū, Japan. It runs approximately north-south. To the west is Ise Bay, while to the east it encloses Mikawa Bay. It faces the Atsumi Peninsula southeast across Mikawa Bay. Chūbu Centrair International Airport is located off the west coast of the peninsula.

== Geography ==
The peninsula is relatively narrow and consists of a hilly terrain.

== Economy ==
The northern part of the peninsula is industrialized, with a western part of them being a part of Chūkyō Industrial Area. The southern part is relatively less industrialized and fishing villages and beaches can be seen.

In 2005, Chubu Centrair International Airport was opened in a man-made island near Tokoname, making the peninsula the main gateway for people coming to Tōkai region by air.

== Overview of 10 municipalities ==
There was a referendum in December 2004 to merge Mihama and Minamichita to form the city of Minami-Centrair(Japanese:南セントレア市). However, the name was not suggested by anyone who voted on the name and was selected by the Mihama-Minamichita merge council with an intent of the city growing as a bedroom community of the airport. This met severe backlash as the Chubu Centrair International airport was in Tokoname, and the name using Katakana, which was not related to the history of the area.

Due to these incidents, the referendum was not passed by the residents, which ended the talks for merge with the council disbanding in the March 2005.

=== Ōbu ===
The city is industrialized with factories from companies such as Sumitomo Heavy Industries and Toyota Industries. The production of grapes are the highest in the prefecture. Wellness valley, a place with welfare, health facilities extending over south of the city to northern Higashiura is being developed.

=== Tōkai ===
It has a main office of multiple steel producers like Daido Steel Co. Ltd., Aichi Steel. It is also a founding place of Kagome. The city is called "City of steel and ran" Because of the prospering production steel and Orchid.

=== Chita ===
The city is a Bed town community and also has multiple thermal power generators.

=== Tokoname ===
Many shopping malls and leisure facilities has opened in the area since the opening of Chubu Centrair International Airport.

=== Handa ===
It houses the main office of Mitsukan. The Kamezaki Shiohi Festival is one of the Yama, Hoko, yataigyoji, which is one of the UNESCO Intangible Cultural Heritage.

=== Higashiura ===
The town is a Commuter town.

The town nearly met the criteria of 50,000 population to be elevated into city status in the 2010 census, but failed due to the population count being readjusted after several anonymous prosecution of data paddings.

=== Agui ===
Agriculture is growing in the town, and it produces the rice brand "Renge chan". Some car part factories has moved in the area.

=== Taketoyo ===
The town has a large solar panel "Mega Solar Taketoyo", by Chubu Electric Power. Miso is famous in the town.

=== Mihama ===
The town seeks to encourage tourism with its beaches and fishing docks. However, this has not been too successful.

=== Minamichita ===
Fishing is a major industry in the town. Many tourists visits the beaches in the town. Himakajima and Shinojima, famous for octopus and Fugu fishing currently is a part of the town.

== Infrastructure ==
=== Highways ===
- Isewangan Expressway
- Chitahantō Road
- Chitaōdan Road
- Chubu International Airport Connecting Road
- Minamichita Road
- Nagoya Expressway

=== Airport ===
- Chubu Centrair International Airport

=== Railways ===
- Tōkaidō Main Line
- Taketoyo Line
- Meitetsu Tokoname Line
- Meitetsu Kōwa Line
- Meitetsu Chita New Line
- Nagoya Rinkai Railway
- Kinuura Rinkai Railway
