= Chubu International Airport Connecting Road =

Toll road in Tokoname, Aichi, Japan

Coordinates: 34.87382°N 136.819696°E

中部国際空港連絡道路 Chubu International Airport Connecting Road
- 中部国際空港連絡道路

Route information
- Length: 2.1 km (1.3 mi)
- Existed: 2005–present

Major junctions
- From: Rinkū Interchange in Tokoname, Aichi; Chitaōdan Road; Aichi Prefectural Route 522
- To: Centrair-higashi Interchange in Tokoname, Aichi; Aichi Prefectural Route 522

Location
- Country: Japan

Highway system
- National highways of Japan; Expressways of Japan

The Chubu International Airport Connecting Road (中部国際空港連絡道路, Chūbu Kokusai Kūkō Renraku Dōro) is a 4-laned toll road in Tokoname, Aichi, Japan. It is managed by Aichi Prefectural Road Public Corporation.

== Overview ==
Officially the road is designated as Aichi Prefectural Route 522. The road is designated for motor vehicles only (自動車専用道路, Jidōsha Senyō Dōro) (motor vehicles must have a displacement of at least 125 cc), and the design standard of the road is similar to national expressways.

Together with the Chitaōdan Road it is also referred to as the Centrair Line to indicate its status as the access road for Chubu Centrair International Airport.

== Interchange list ==
- IC - interchange, JCT - junction

Name	Connections	Dist. from Handa-Chūō JCT	Notes	Location
Through to Chitaōdan Road
Rinkū IC	Pref. Route 522 (Chubu International Airport Route)	8.5		Tokoname, Aichi
Rinkū Toll Gate		↓		Tokoname, Aichi
Centrair Bridge		↓	Length - 1,414 m	Tokoname, Aichi
Centrair-higashi IC		10.6		Tokoname, Aichi
Expressway ends, road continues as Pref. Route 522
