= CA61 =

CA61 or CA-61 may refer to:

- California State Route 61, a highway in the US state of California
- Cvjetkovic CA-61, a monoplane aircraft
- Kyōwa Station, a railway station in Ōbu, Aichi Prefecture, Japan (station code: CA61)
