= Ōbu =

Ōbu 大府市
- City
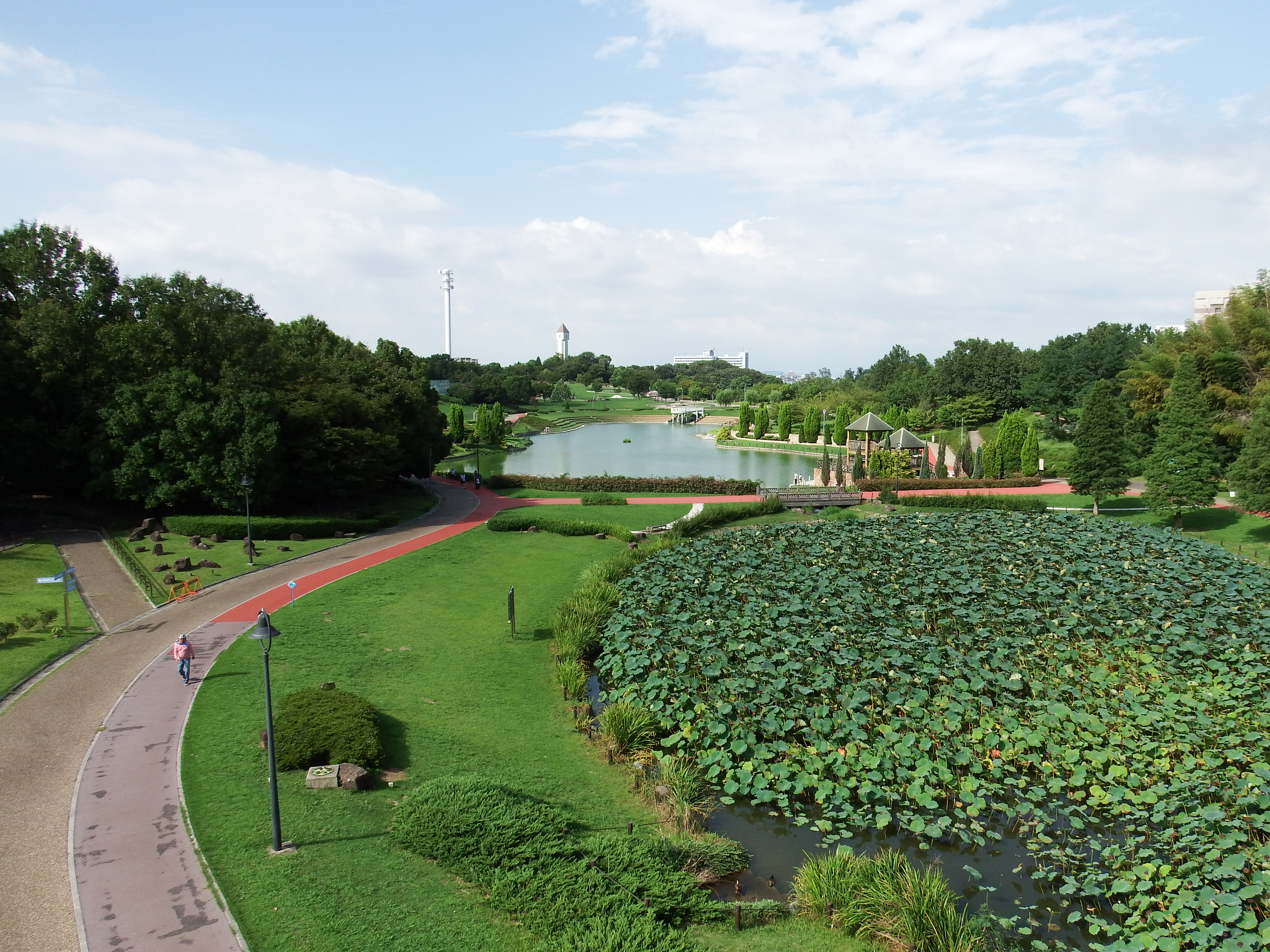
- Aichi Health Village Park

- Flag Emblem

- Location of Ōbu in Aichi Prefecture

- Coordinates: 35°00′42″N 136°57′49.2″E
- Country: Japan
- Region: Chūbu (Tōkai)
- Prefecture: Aichi

Government
  - Mayor: Takayasu Kuno

Area
  - Total: 33.66 km^{2} (13.00 sq mi)

Population (October 1, 2019)
  - Total: 92,179
  - Density: 2,739/km^{2} (7,093/sq mi)
- Time zone: UTC+9 (Japan Standard Time)
- Phone number: 0562-47-2111
- Address: 5-70 Chūō-chō, Ōbu-shi, Aichi-ken 474-8701
- Climate: Cfa
- Website: Official website
- Symbols
- Flower: Gardenia
- Tree: Holly

Ōbu (大府市, Ōbu-shi; Japanese pronunciation: [ó̞ò̞.bɯ̈̀, ò̞ó̞.bɯ̈́(.ɕì), ó̞ó̞.bɯ̈́(.ɕì)]) is a city located in Aichi Prefecture, Japan. As of 1 October 2019, the city had an estimated population of 92,179 in 39,382 households, and a population density of 2,739 persons per km^{2}. The total area of the city is 33.66 square kilometres (13.00 sq mi). Ōbu has been a member of the World Health Organization’s Alliance for Healthy Cities (AFHC) since June 5, 2000.

== Geography ==
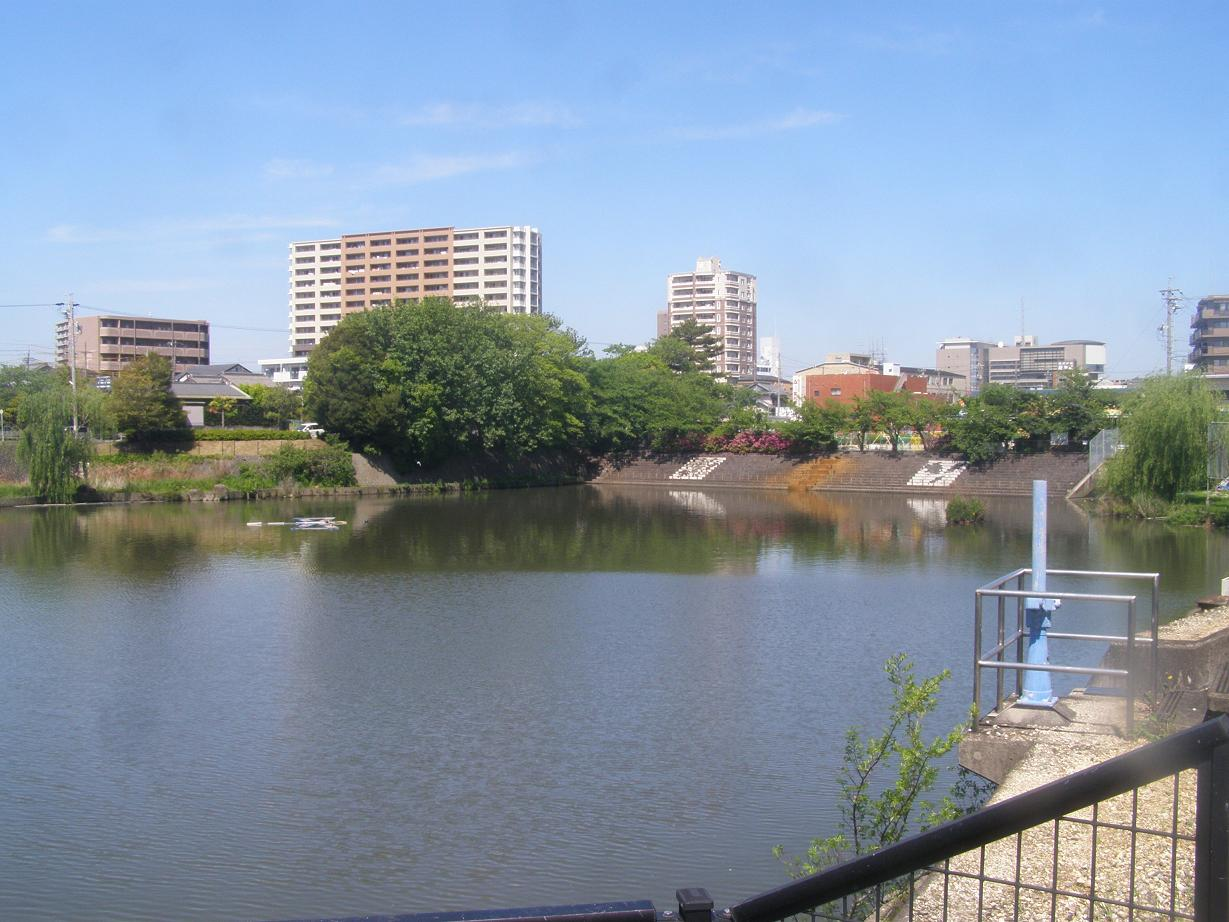
Skyline of Ōbu City

Ōbu is located in the far northeastern neck of Chita Peninsula in southern Aichi Prefecture, and is bordered by the metropolis of Nagoya to the north.

=== Climate ===
The city has a climate characterized by hot and humid summers, and relatively mild winters (Köppen climate classification Cfa). The average annual temperature in Ōbu is 16.6 °C (61.9 °F). The average annual rainfall is 1,506.0 mm (59.29 in) with October as the wettest month. The temperatures are highest on average in August, at around 28.7 °C (83.7 °F), and lowest in January, at around 5.3 °C (41.5 °F).

Climate data for Ōbu (2012−2020 normals, extremes 2012−present)
Month	Jan	Feb	Mar	Apr	May	Jun	Jul	Aug	Sep	Oct	Nov	Dec	Year
Record high °C (°F)	18.2 (64.8)	22.4 (72.3)	24.8 (76.6)	28.8 (83.8)	33.4 (92.1)	34.3 (93.7)	39.2 (102.6)	38.9 (102.0)	36.9 (98.4)	31.8 (89.2)	25.0 (77.0)	23.8 (74.8)	39.2 (102.6)
Mean daily maximum °C (°F)	9.5 (49.1)	10.4 (50.7)	15.2 (59.4)	19.8 (67.6)	25.4 (77.7)	27.7 (81.9)	31.5 (88.7)	33.6 (92.5)	29.1 (84.4)	23.6 (74.5)	17.6 (63.7)	11.6 (52.9)	21.2 (70.3)
Daily mean °C (°F)	5.3 (41.5)	5.9 (42.6)	10.0 (50.0)	14.8 (58.6)	20.0 (68.0)	23.1 (73.6)	27.1 (80.8)	28.7 (83.7)	24.5 (76.1)	19.1 (66.4)	13.0 (55.4)	7.4 (45.3)	16.6 (61.8)
Mean daily minimum °C (°F)	1.1 (34.0)	1.8 (35.2)	5.2 (41.4)	9.9 (49.8)	14.9 (58.8)	19.3 (66.7)	23.8 (74.8)	25.0 (77.0)	20.9 (69.6)	15.3 (59.5)	8.6 (47.5)	3.2 (37.8)	12.4 (54.3)
Record low °C (°F)	−4.7 (23.5)	−4.3 (24.3)	−1.6 (29.1)	2.7 (36.9)	6.2 (43.2)	12.8 (55.0)	18.7 (65.7)	19.5 (67.1)	12.1 (53.8)	6.6 (43.9)	−0.6 (30.9)	−3.3 (26.1)	−4.7 (23.5)
Average precipitation mm (inches)	53.3 (2.10)	56.3 (2.22)	113.8 (4.48)	141.1 (5.56)	128.5 (5.06)	164.0 (6.46)	177.9 (7.00)	141.4 (5.57)	186.7 (7.35)	222.7 (8.77)	61.8 (2.43)	65.4 (2.57)	1,506 (59.29)
Average precipitation days (≥ 1.0 mm)	5.6	5.8	8.6	8.6	8.3	11.3	11.0	8.3	10.5	9.6	6.4	6.8	100.8
Mean monthly sunshine hours	187.1	174.6	210.0	204.3	239.4	168.6	176.1	224.7	154.8	158.1	169.1	165.5	2,234.3
Source: Japan Meteorological Agency

=== Demographics ===
Per Japanese census data, the population of Ōbu has been increasing steadily over the past 70 years.

Historical population
Year	Pop.	±%
1940	13,967	—
1950	20,427	+46.3%
1960	26,137	+28.0%
1970	48,960	+87.3%
1980	62,277	+27.2%
1990	69,720	+12.0%
2000	75,273	+8.0%
2010	85,254	+13.3%

=== Neighboring municipalities ===
Aichi Prefecture

- Kariya
- Higashiura
- Nagoya (Midori-ku)
- Tōkai
- Toyoake

== History ==
=== Late modern period ===
The village of Ōbu was established within Chita District, Aichi on October 1, 1889, with the establishment of the modern municipalities system. On May 1, 1906, Ōbu annexed the neighboring villages of Yoshida, Kyowa, Kitasaka, Yokote, Nagagusa and part of the village of Morioka. It was elevated to town status on November 1, 1915.

=== Contemporary history ===
Ōbu became a city on September 1, 1970.

== Government ==
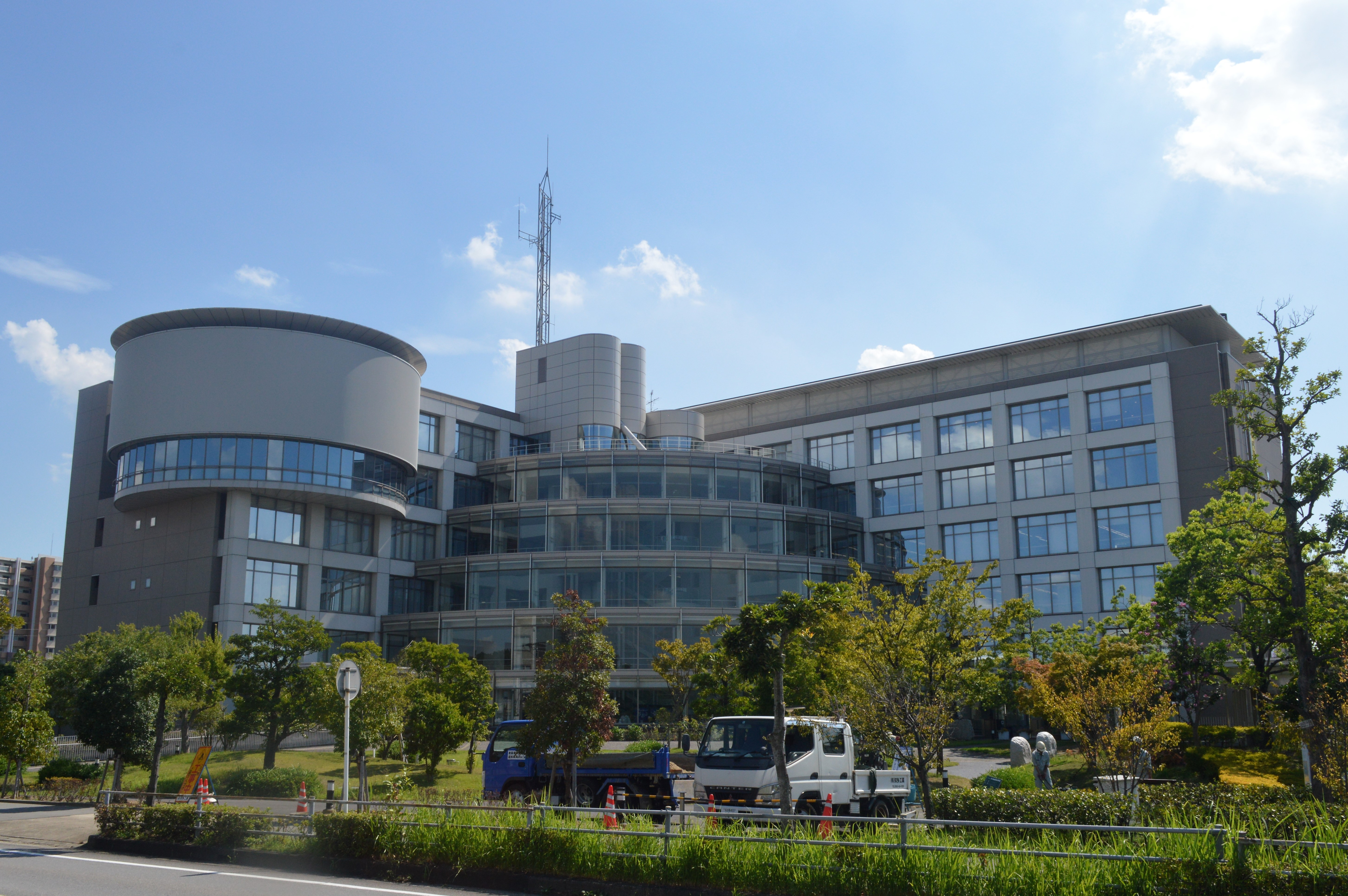
Ōbu city hall

Ōbu has a mayor-council form of government with a directly elected mayor and a unicameral city legislature of 19 members. The city contributes one member to the Aichi Prefectural Assembly. In terms of national politics, the city is part of Aichi District 7 of the lower house of the Diet of Japan.

== Sister cities ==
- Port Phillip, Victoria, Australia, since November 20, 1993

== Economy ==
=== Tertiary sector ===
==== Commerce ====
Ōbu has a mixed economic base due to its proximity to the Nagoya metropolis and numerous transportation connections.

== Education ==
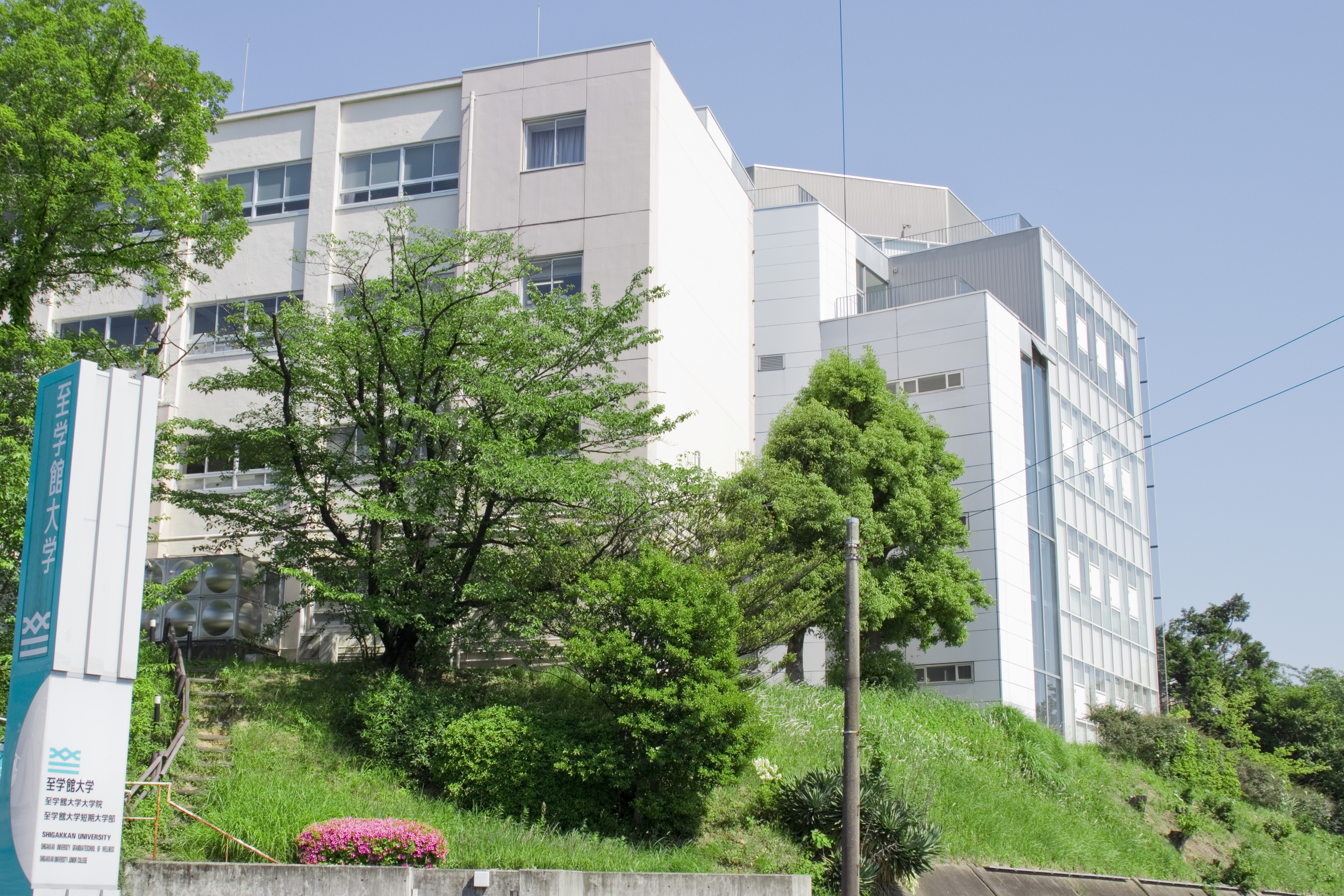
Shigakkan University

=== University ===
- Shigakkan University
- University of Human Environments, Ōbu campus

=== Schools ===
- Ōbu has nine public elementary schools and four public junior high schools operated by the city government, and three public high schools operated by the Aichi Prefectural Board of Education.

== Transportation ==
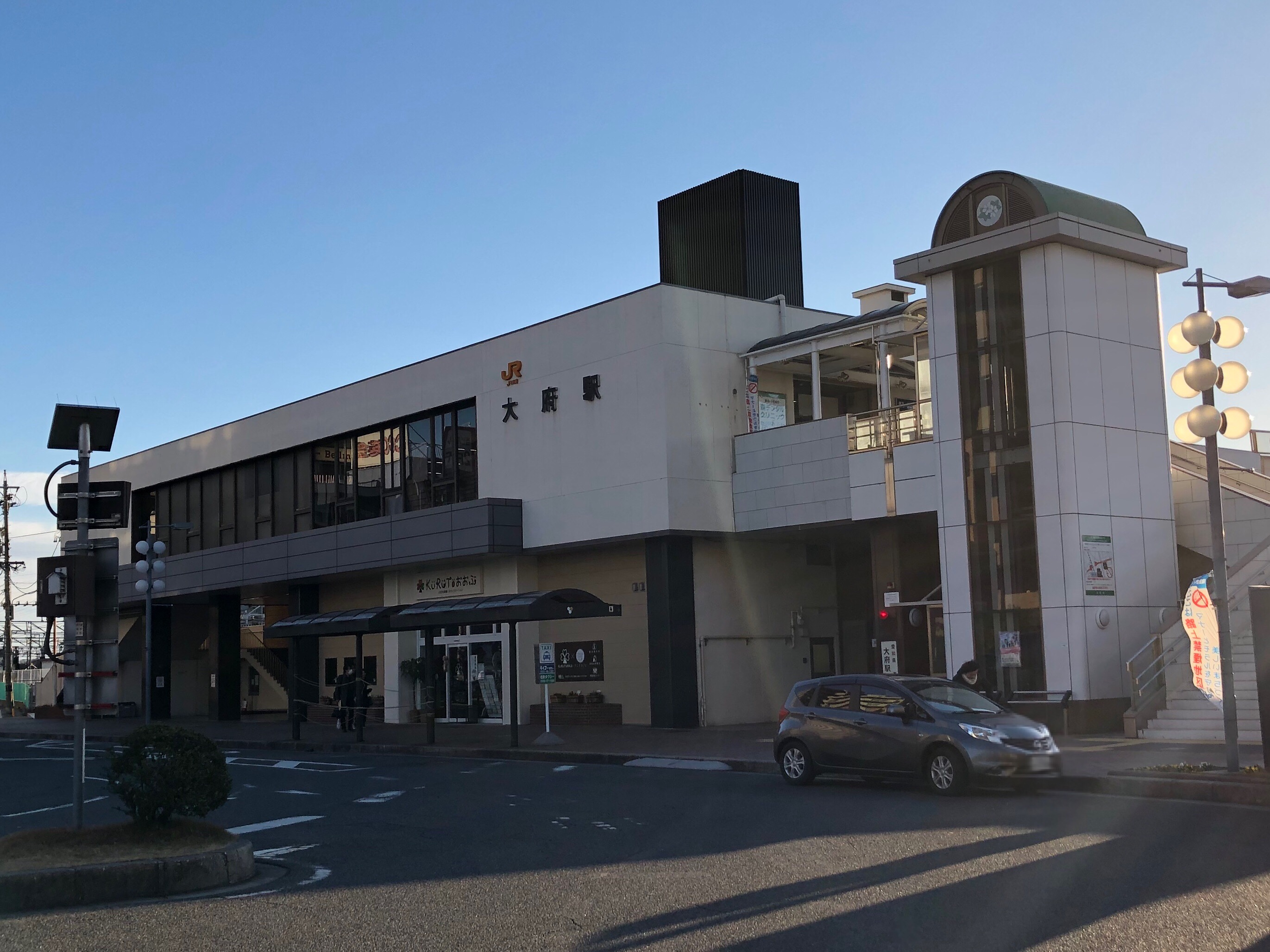
Ōbu Station

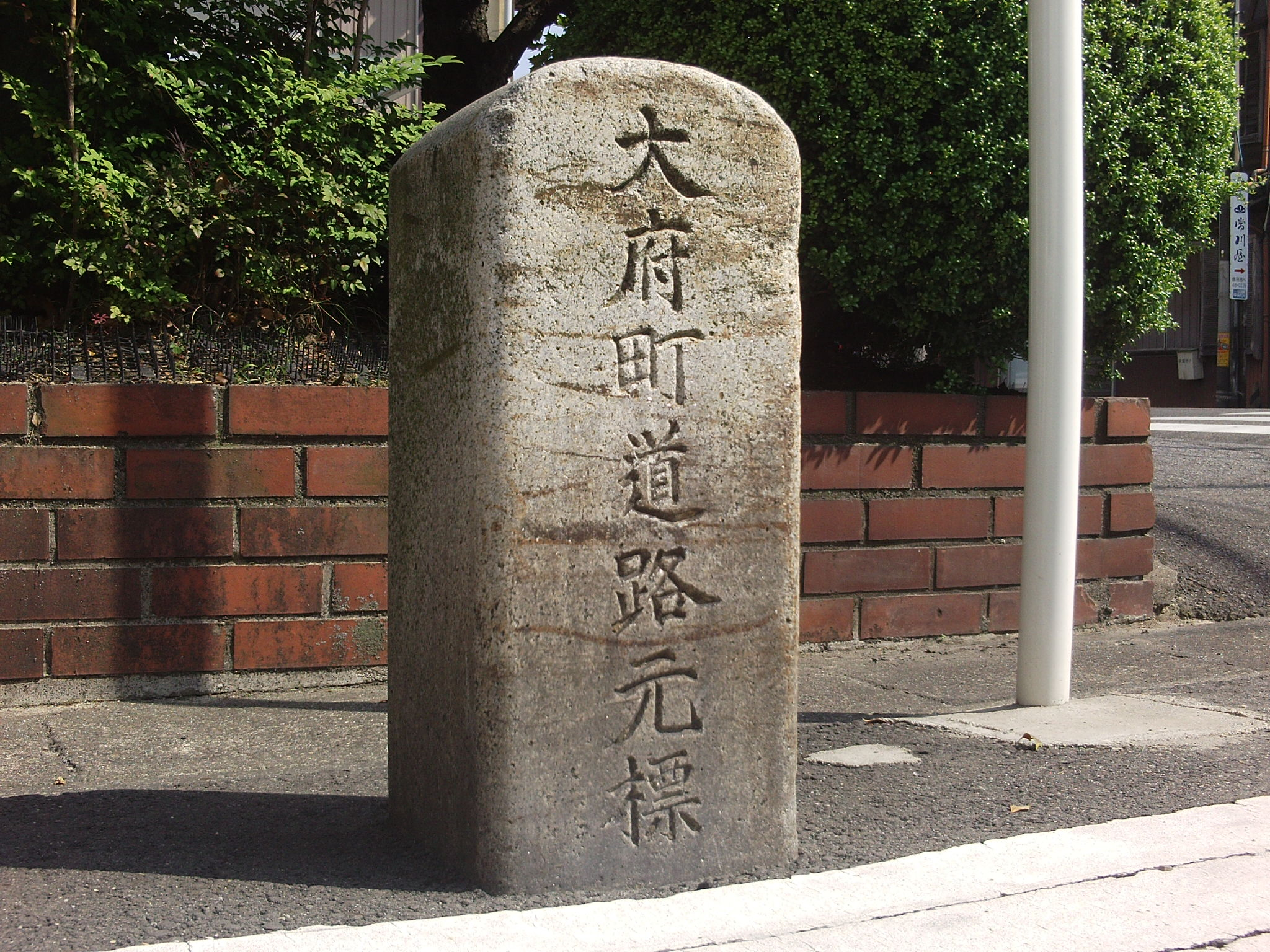
The Kilometre Zero of Ōbu

=== Railways ===
==== Conventional lines ====
Central Japan Railway Company

- Tōkaidō Main Line: - Ōbu - Kyōwa -
- Taketoyo Line: Ōbu -

=== Roads ===
==== Expressways ====
- Isewangan Expressway
- Chitahantō Road

==== Japan National Route ====
- National Route 23
- National Route 155
- National Route 366

== Notable people from Ōbu ==
- Kumiko Koiwai, figure skater
- Masayoshi Nagata, mathematician
- Takahiro Nakai, Judoka
- Kyoko Takezawa, violinist
- Hidehiko Yoshida, Olympic gold-medalist judoka
