= Minami-Ōdaka Station =

Railway station in Nagoya, Japan

CA62 Minami-Ōdaka Station 南大高駅
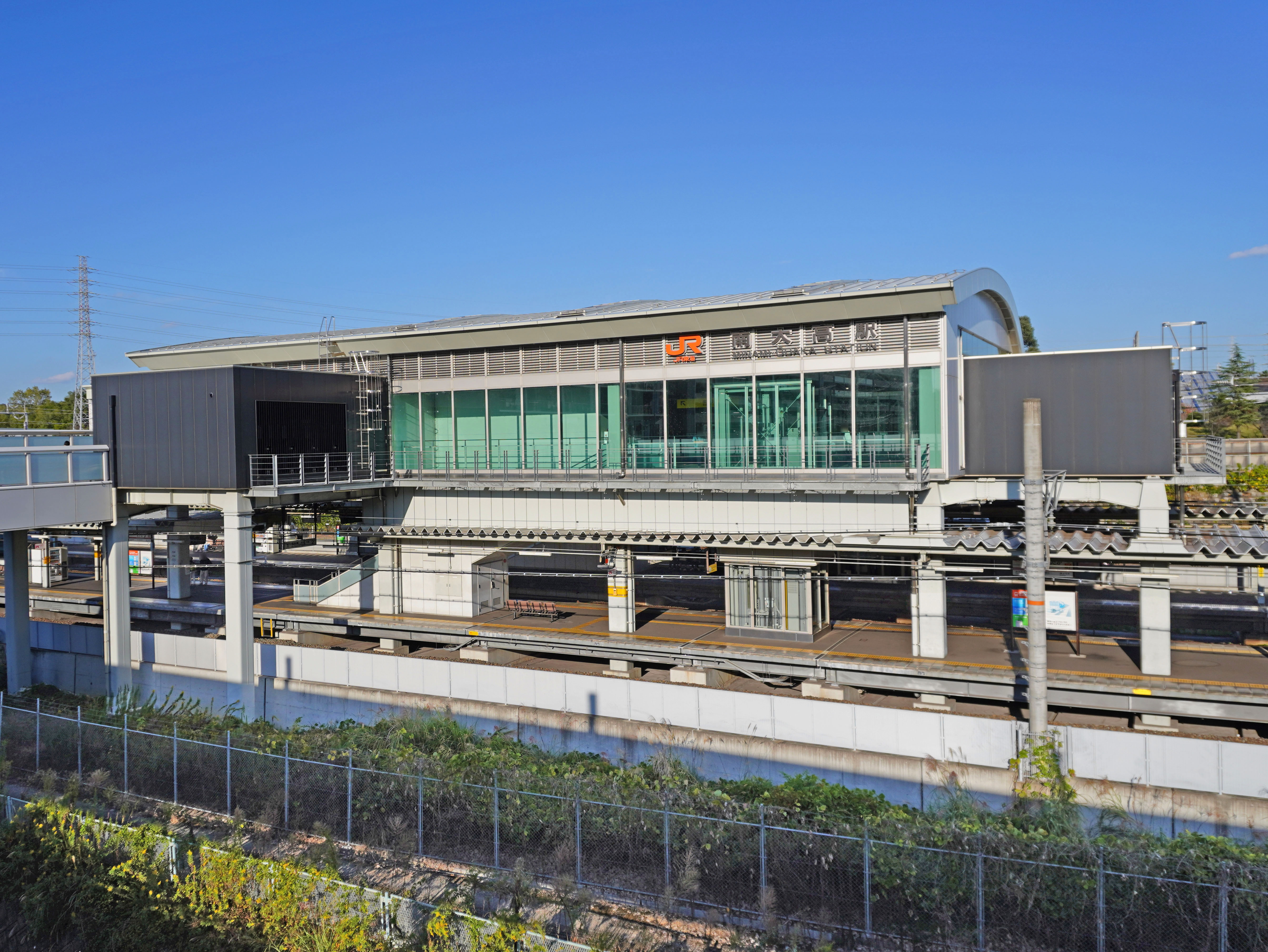
- Minami-Ōdaka Station in November 2022

General information
- Location: Ōdaka-cho Ikenouchi 4-10, Midori-ku, Nagoya-shi, Aichi-ken 459-8001; Japan
- Coordinates: 35.0553°N 136.948°E
- Operator: JR Central
- Line: Tokaido Main Line
- Distance: 351.8 kilometers from Tokyo
- Platforms: 1 side + 1 island platforms

Other information
- Status: Staffed
- Station code: CA62
- Website: Official website

History
- Opened: March 14, 2009

Passengers
- 2023–2024: 13,738 daily

Services
Preceding station	JR Central	Following station
Ōdaka towards Maibara	Tōkaidō Main Line Local	Kyōwa towards Atami
Location
- Location within Aichi Prefecture Location within Japan

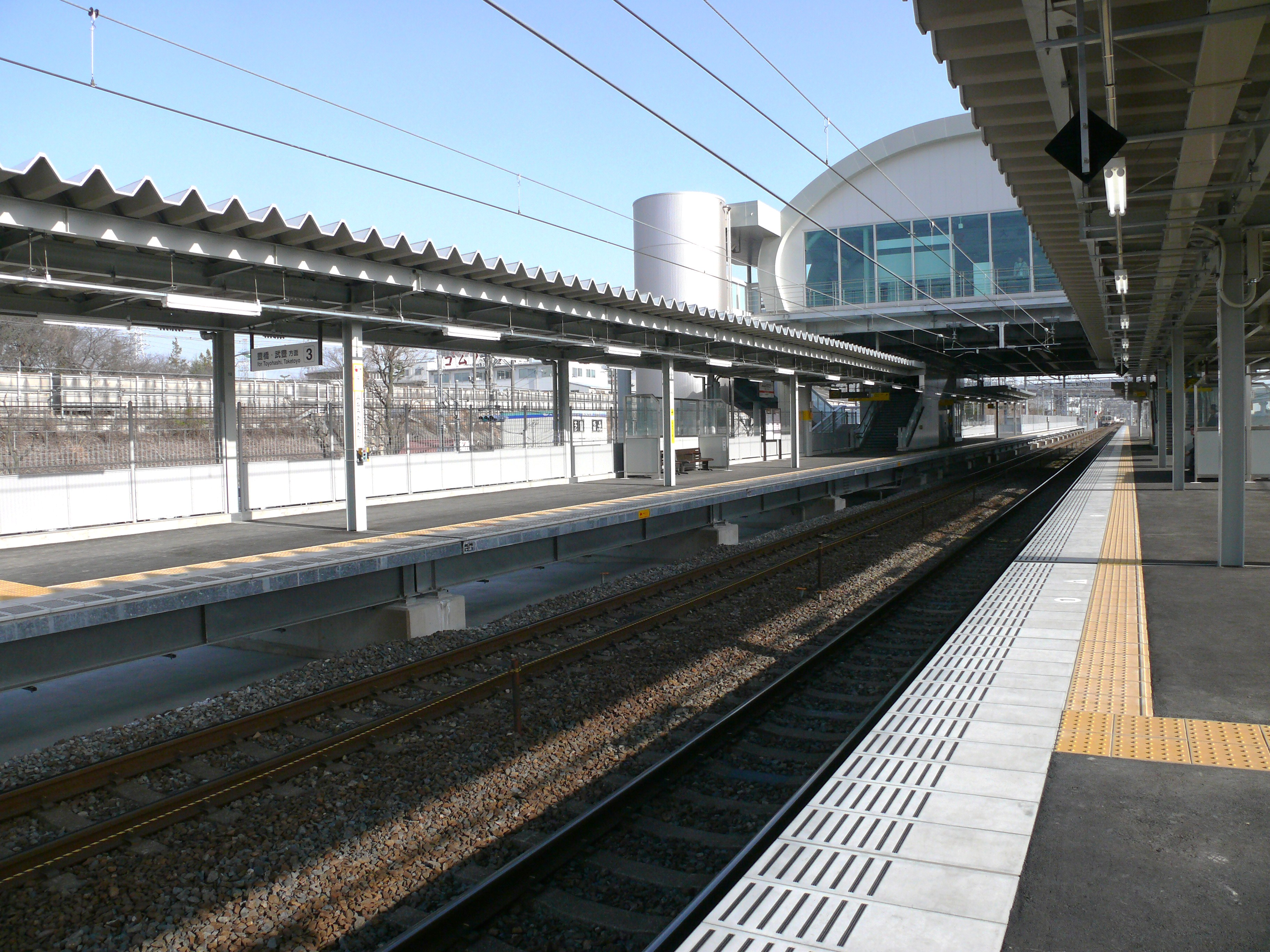
Platform

Minami-Ōdaka Station (南大高駅, Minami-Ōdaka-eki) is a railway station in Midori-ku, Nagoya, Japan, operated by Central Japan Railway Company (JR Tōkai).

Minami-Ōdaka Station is served by the Tōkaidō Main Line, and is located 351.8 kilometers from the starting point of the line at Tokyo Station.

== Station layout ==
The station has one elevated side platform and one elevated island platform. The station building is built above the platforms. The station building has automated ticket machines, TOICA automated turnstiles and a staffed ticket office.

=== Platforms ===
1, 2	■ Tōkaidō Main Line	for Nagoya and Ōgaki
3	■ Tōkaidō Main Line	for Taketoyo and Toyohashi

== History ==
Minami-Ōdaka opened on 14 March 2009.

Station numbering was introduced to the section of the Tōkaidō Line operated JR Central in March 2018; Minami-Ōdaka Station was assigned station number CA62.

== Passenger statistics ==
In fiscal 2017, the station was used by an average of 6,719 passengers daily

== Surrounding area ==
This station provides access to Ōdaka Æon, a large shopping center, via a pedestrian walkway which connects the station and the shopping center directly. Nearby is also Ōdaka Green, a park.

== See also ==
- List of railway stations in Japan
