= Shigakkan University =

Coordinates: 35.031°N 136.972°E

- 至学館大学
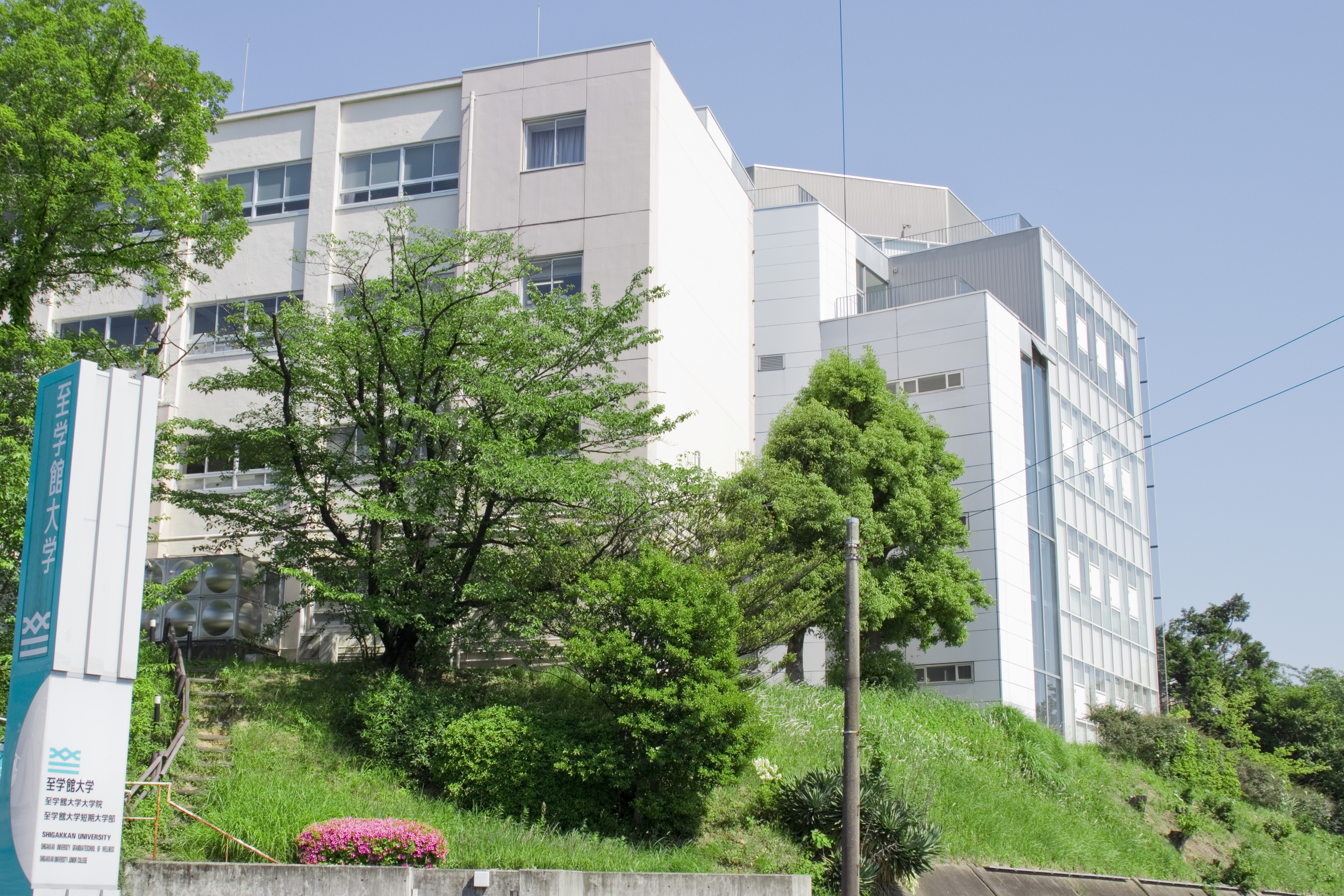
- Former name: Chukyo Women's University (until 2010)
- Type: Private
- Established: 1905
- Location: Ōbu, Aichi, Japan
- Website: www.sgk.ac.jp (in Japanese)

Shigakkan University (Japanese: 至学館大学, Hepburn: Shigakkan Daigaku) is a private university in Ōbu, Aichi, Japan.

Until the school renamed itself to Shigakkan in 2010, the school was known as Chukyo Women's University. The school was founded in 1905.

Despite that the name contained the word "women," the school had accepted male students since 1998.

== Notable alumni ==
- Jungle Kyona
- Kaori Icho
- Saori Yoshida
