= Ōdaka Station =

Railway station in Nagoya, Japan

CA63 Ōdaka Station 大高駅
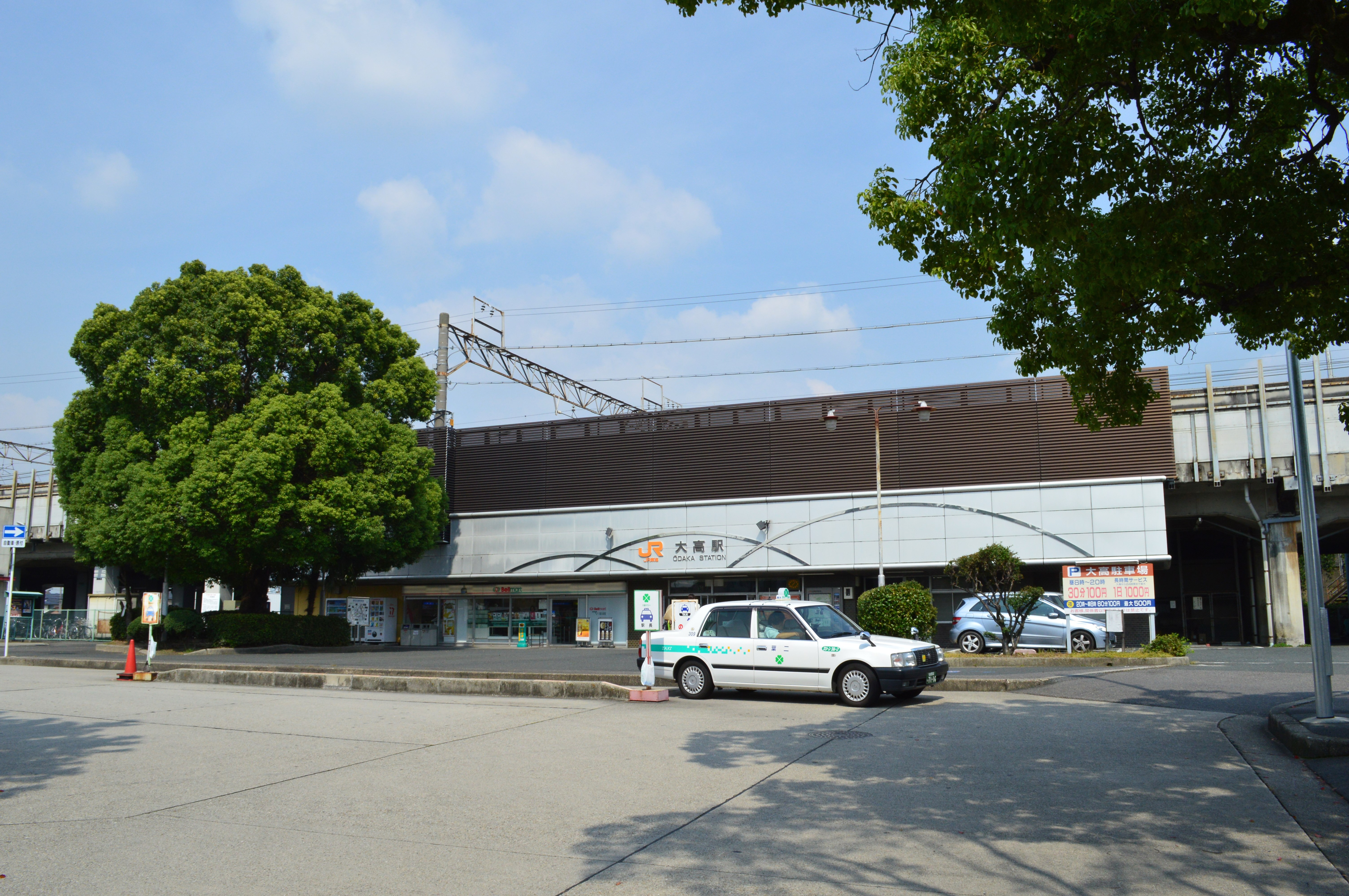
- Ōdaka Station in September 2015

General information
- Location: Tsuruta-45-1 Ōdakachō, Midori-ku, Nagoya-shi, Aichi-ken 459-8001; Japan
- Coordinates: 35°4′10″N 136°56′25″E
- Operator: JR Central
- Line: Tokaido Main Line
- Distance: 353.6 kilometers from Tokyo
- Platforms: 1 side platforms

Other information
- Status: Staffed
- Station code: CA63
- Website: Official website

History
- Opened: March 1, 1886

Passengers
- 2023–2024: 7,712 daily

Services
Preceding station	JR Central	Following station
Atsuta towards Maibara	Tōkaidō Main Line Local	Minami-Ōdaka towards Atami
Location
- Location within Aichi Prefecture Location within Japan

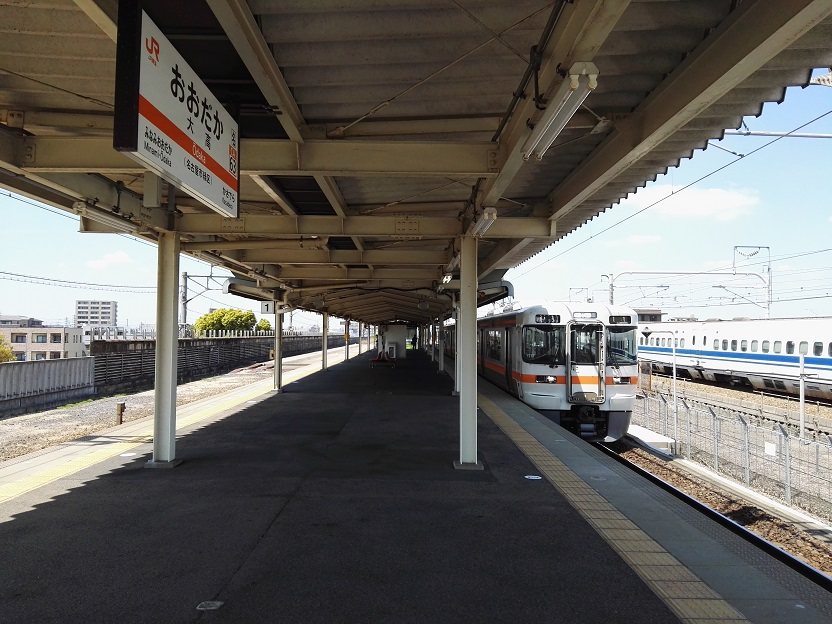
Platform

Ōdaka Station (大高駅, Ōdaka-eki) is a railway station in Midori-ku, Nagoya, Japan, operated by Central Japan Railway Company (JR Tōkai).Ōdaka Station is served by the Tōkaidō Main Line, and is located 353.6 kilometers from the starting point of the line at Tokyo Station.

== Station layout ==
The station has one elevated island platform with the station building underneath. The station building has automated ticket machines, TOICA automated turnstiles and a staffed ticket office.

=== Platforms ===
1, 2	■ Tōkaidō Main Line	for Nagoya and Ōgaki
3, 4	■ Tōkaidō Main Line	for Taketoyo and Toyohashi

== Station history ==
Ōdaka Station was opened on March 1, 1886 with the completion of the Japanese Government Railway (JGR) line connecting Taketoyo Station and Atsuta Station. This line was named the Tōkaidō Line in 1895 and the Tōkaidō Main Line in 1909. A new station building was completed in March 1935. The JGR became the JNR after World War II. All freight operations were discontinued from August 1961. A new station building was completed in May 1962, but was relocated to its present location and rebuilt in 1978. With the privatization and dissolution of the JNR on April 1, 1987, the station came under the control of the Central Japan Railway Company.

Station numbering was introduced to the section of the Tōkaidō Line operated JR Central in March 2018; Ōdaka Station was assigned station number CA63.

== Passenger statistics ==
In fiscal 2017, the station was used by an average of 4,323 passengers daily

== Surrounding area ==
- site of the Battle of Okehazama
- Midori-ku Ward Office

== See also ==
- List of railway stations in Japan
