= University of Human Environments =

- 人間環境大学
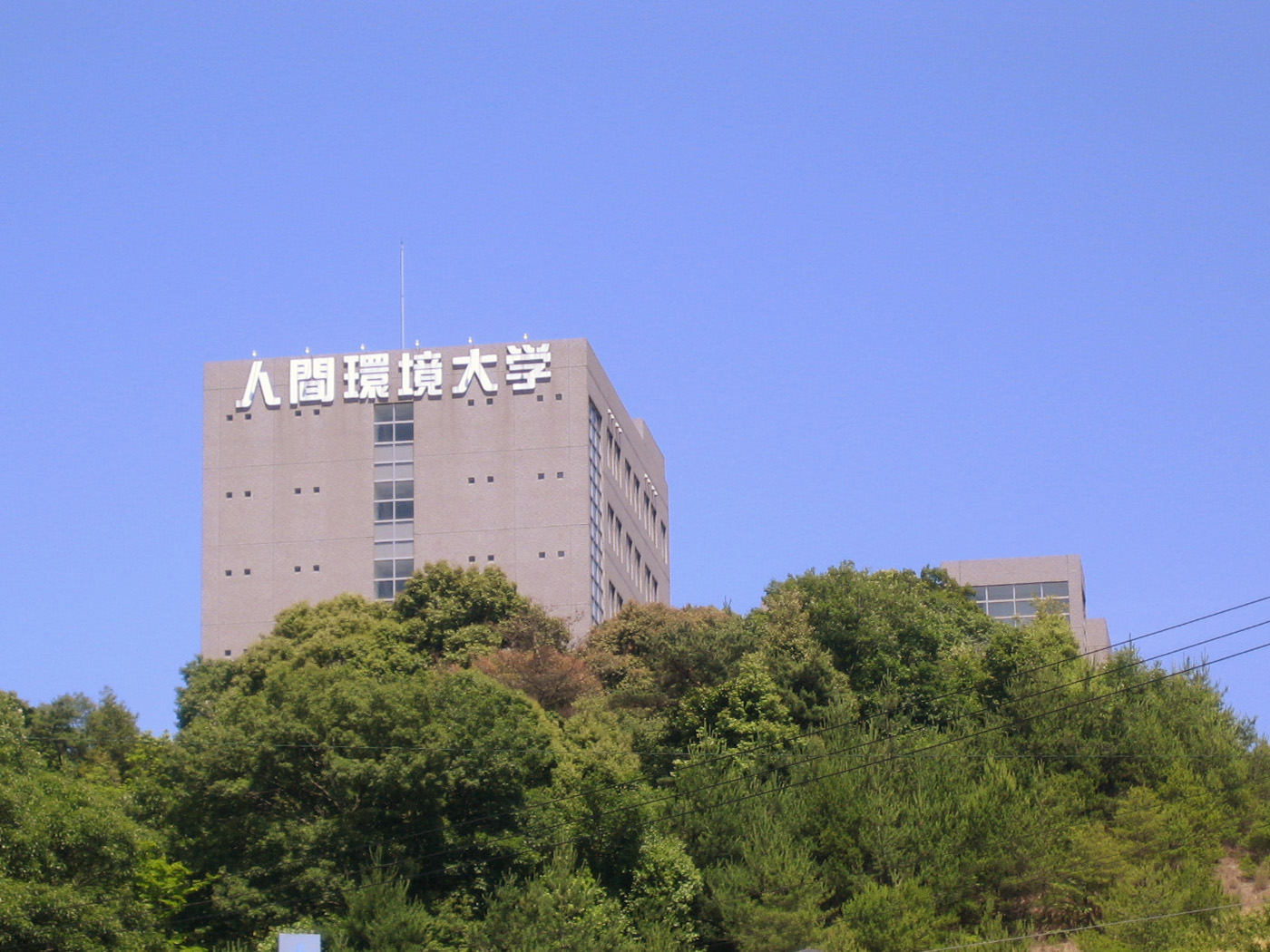
- University of Human Environments
- Type: Private
- Established: 2000
- Academic staff: 55
- Undergraduates: 550
- Postgraduates: 17
- Location: Okazaki, Aichi, Japan; 34.897°N 137.264°E
- Nickname: UHE
- Website: www.uhe.ac.jp (in Japanese)

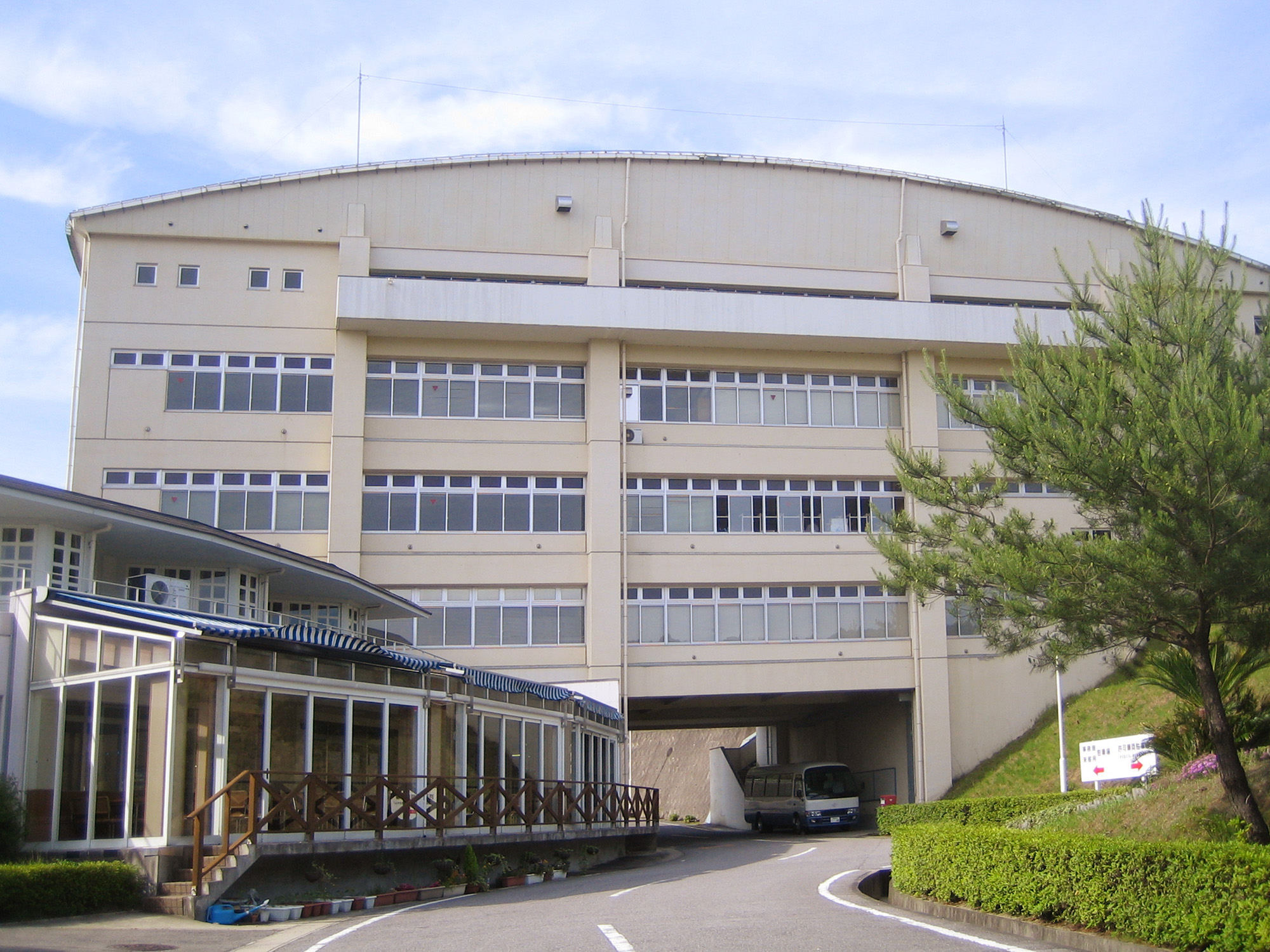
University of Human Environments 2

University of Human Environments (人間環境大学, Ningen kankyō daigaku) is a private university in Okazaki, Aichi, Japan, established in 2000. It has an associated private Junior High School and High School.
