= Kyōwa Station =

Railway station in Ōbu, Aichi Prefecture, Japan

CA61 Kyōwa Station 共和駅
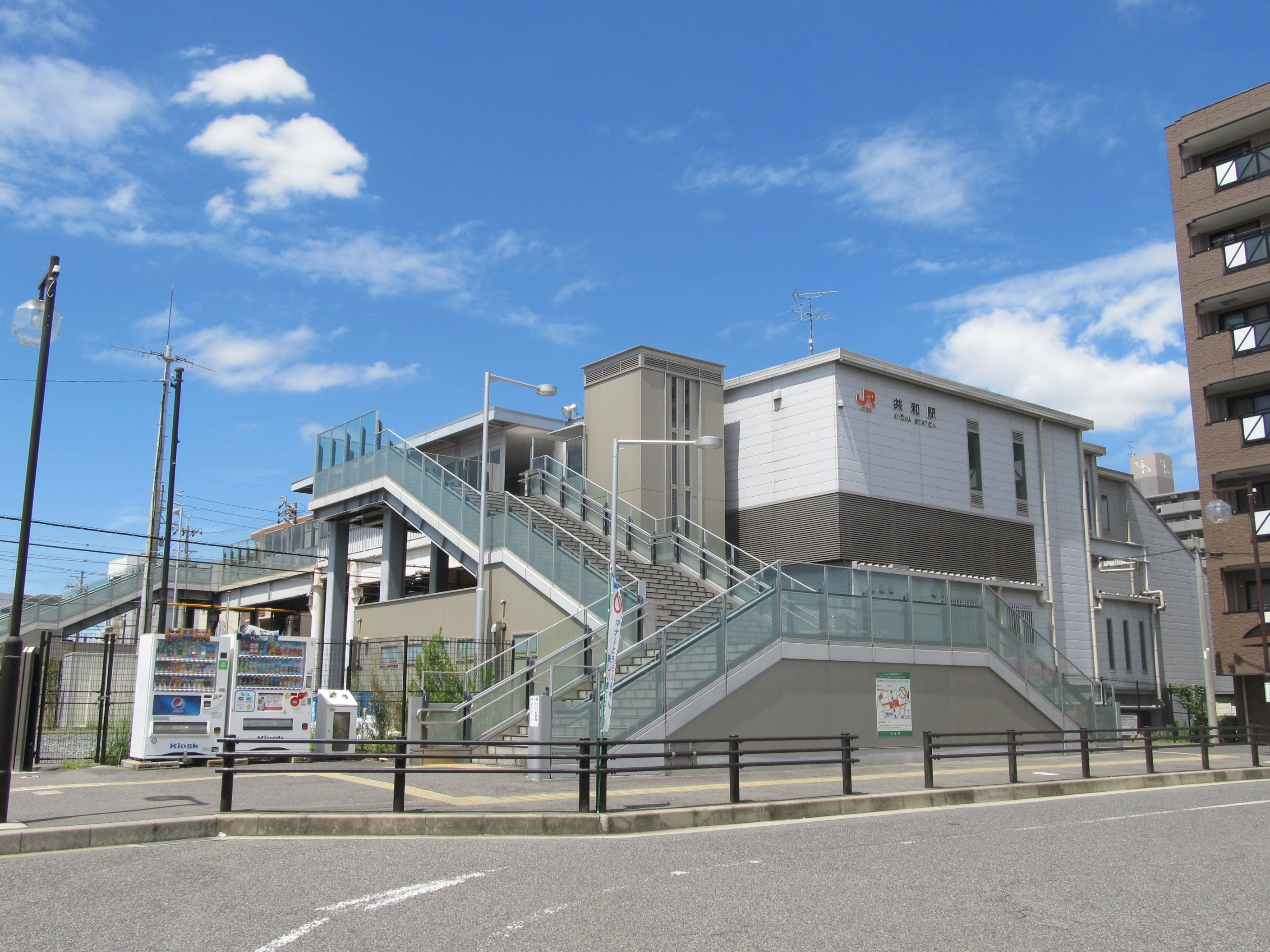
- Kyōwa Station in August 2017

General information
- Location: 9-2-15 Kyōeichō, Obu-shi, Aichi-ken 474-0074; Japan
- Coordinates: 35.0354°N 136.9547°E
- Operator: JR Central
- Line: Tokaido Main Line
- Distance: 373.8 kilometers from Tokyo
- Platforms: 1 side + 1 island platform

Other information
- Status: Staffed
- Station code: CA61
- Website: Official website

History
- Opened: December 7, 1933

Passengers
- 2023–2024: 18,068 daily

Services
Preceding station	JR Central	Following station
Minami-Ōdaka towards Maibara	Tōkaidō Main Line Local Semi Rapid Rapid	Ōbu towards Atami
Location
- Location within Aichi Prefecture Location within Japan

Kyōwa Station (共和駅, Kyōwa-eki) is a railway station in the city of Ōbu, Aichi Prefecture, Japan, operated by Central Japan Railway Company (JR Tōkai).

Kyōwa Station is served by the Tōkaidō Main Line, and is located 349.5 kilometers from the starting point of the line at Tokyo Station.

== Station layout ==
The station has one side platform and one island platform connected by an elevated station building.The station building has automated ticket machines, TOICA automated turnstiles and a staffed ticket office.

=== Platforms ===
1	■ Tōkaidō Main Line	For Toyohashi, Taketoyo
2, 3	■ Tōkaidō Main Line	For Nagoya and Ōgaki

== History ==
Kyōwa Station was opened on December 7, 1933, as a passenger station on the Japanese Government Railways (JGR) Tōkaidō Main Line. The station was closed on November 1, 1940, and reopened on July 11, 1945, but only for seasonal operations. The JGR became the Japan National Railway (JNR) after World War II. Full passenger operations did not resume until September 1, 1951. With the privatization and dissolution of the JNR on April 1, 1987, the station came under the control of the Central Japan Railway Company. Automatic turnstiles were installed in May 1992, and the TOICA system of magnetic fare cards was implemented in October 2007.

Station numbering was introduced to the section of the Tōkaidō Line operated JR Central in March 2018; Kyōwa Station was assigned station number CA61.

== Passenger statistics ==
In fiscal 2018, the station was used by an average of 9666 passengers daily.

== Surrounding area ==
- Ōbu Kita Junior High School
- Kyocho Elementary School

== See also ==
- List of railway stations in Japan
