= Cvjetkovic CA-61 =

1960s American homebuilt monoplane aircraft

CA-61 Mini-Ace

General information
- Type: Single-seat homebuilt monoplane
- Manufacturer: Cvjetkovic Aircraft
- Designer: Anton Cvjetkovic
- Number built: 10+

History
- First flight: 1962

The Cvjetkovic CA-61 Mini-Ace is a 1960s American homebuilt monoplane aircraft designed by Anton Cvjetkovic.

== Development ==
Designed by Anton Cvjetkovic for home construction, the CA-61 Mini-Ace is a single-seat wooden low-wing monoplane with a fixed tailwheel undercarriage. It was first flown in 1962. A retractable landing gear version (CA-61R) was also designed to be home-built.

The aircraft is designed to be flown with a Continental A65, however 1600cc Volkswagen engines have been implemented as well. Some builders have installed side opening and open-cockpit variations of windscreens.

One example was built in the attic of a building in Knott's Berry Farm. The aircraft has an ICAO Type Designator CA61

== Variants ==
CA-61F
Fixed landing gear version for home building
CA-61R
Retractable landing gear version for home building

== Specifications (prototype (single seat)) ==
Data from Jane's All the World's Aircraft 1967–68

General characteristics

- Crew: 1
- Length: 18 ft 11 in (5.77 m)
- Wingspan: 27 ft 6 in (8.38 m)
- Height: 6 ft 10 in (2.08 m)
- Wing area: 126.5 sq ft (11.75 m^{2})
- Aspect ratio: 6:1
- Airfoil: NACA 4415
- Empty weight: 606 lb (275 kg)
- Gross weight: 800 lb (363 kg)
- Fuel capacity: 17 US gal (14 imp gal; 64 L)
- Powerplant: 1 × Continental A65 air-cooled four-cylinder horizontally opposed piston engine, 65 hp (48 kW)

Performance

- Maximum speed: 120 mph (190 km/h, 100 kn) at sea level
- Cruise speed: 100 mph (160 km/h, 87 kn)
- Range: 425 mi (684 km, 369 nmi)
