= Shinkawa-machi Station =

Railway station in Hekinan, Aichi Prefecture, Japan

Shinkawa-machi Station 新川町駅

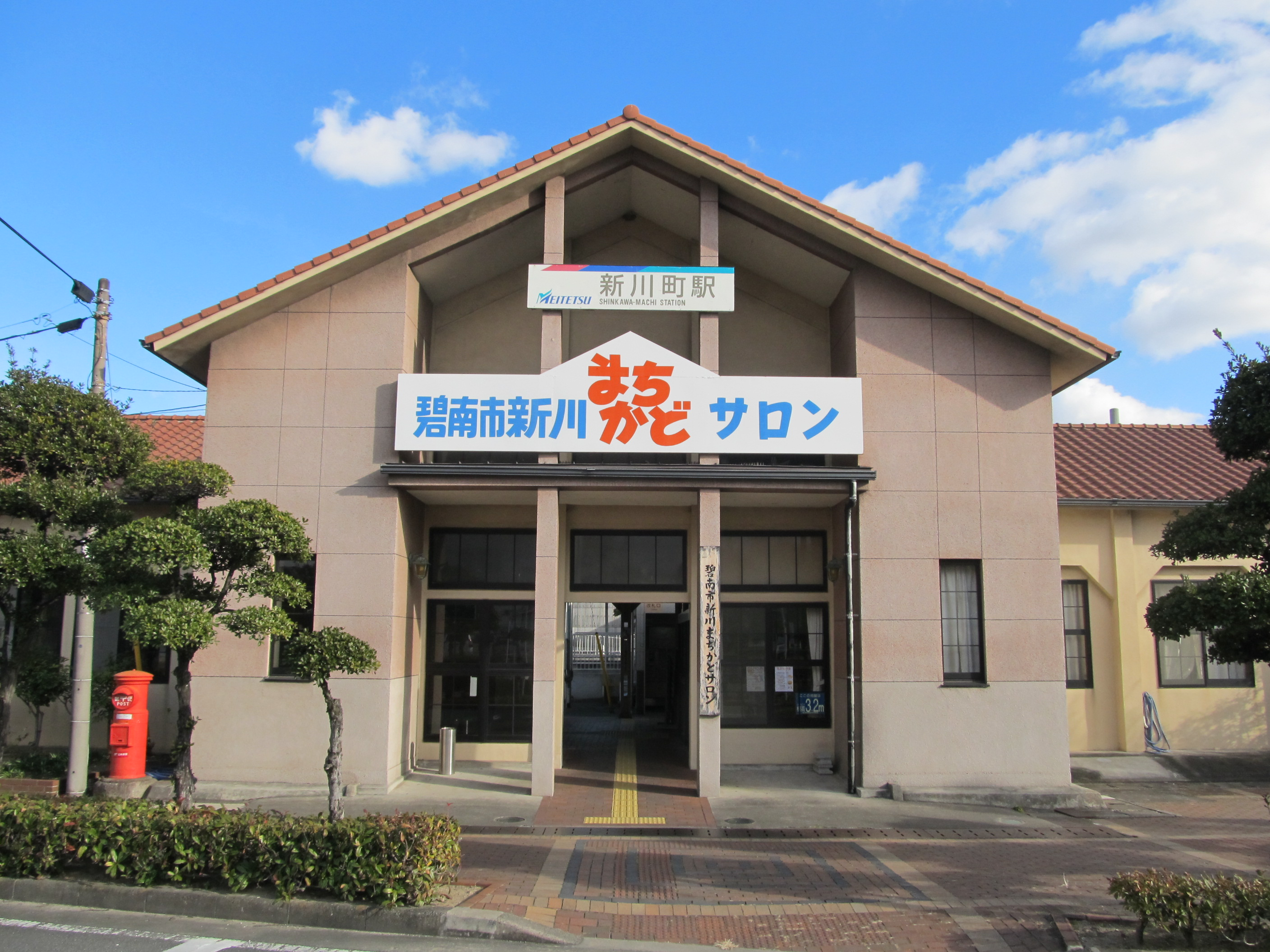
- Shinkawa-machi Station in January 2019

General information
- Location: Shinkawa-machi 3-chome, Hekinan-shi, Aichi-ken 447-0863; Japan
- Coordinates: 34.8964°N 136.99°E
- Operator: Meitetsu
- Line: ■ Meitetsu Mikawa Line
- Distance: 37.1 kilometers from Sanage
- Platforms: 2 side platform

Other information
- Status: Unstaffed
- Station code: MU09
- Website: Official website

History
- Opened: February 5, 1914

Passengers
- FY2017: 1298

Services
Preceding station	Meitetsu	Following station
Kita Shinkawa towards Chiryū	Mikawa Line Chiryū–Hekinan	Hekinan-chūō towards Hekinan
Location
- Location within Aichi Prefecture Location within Japan

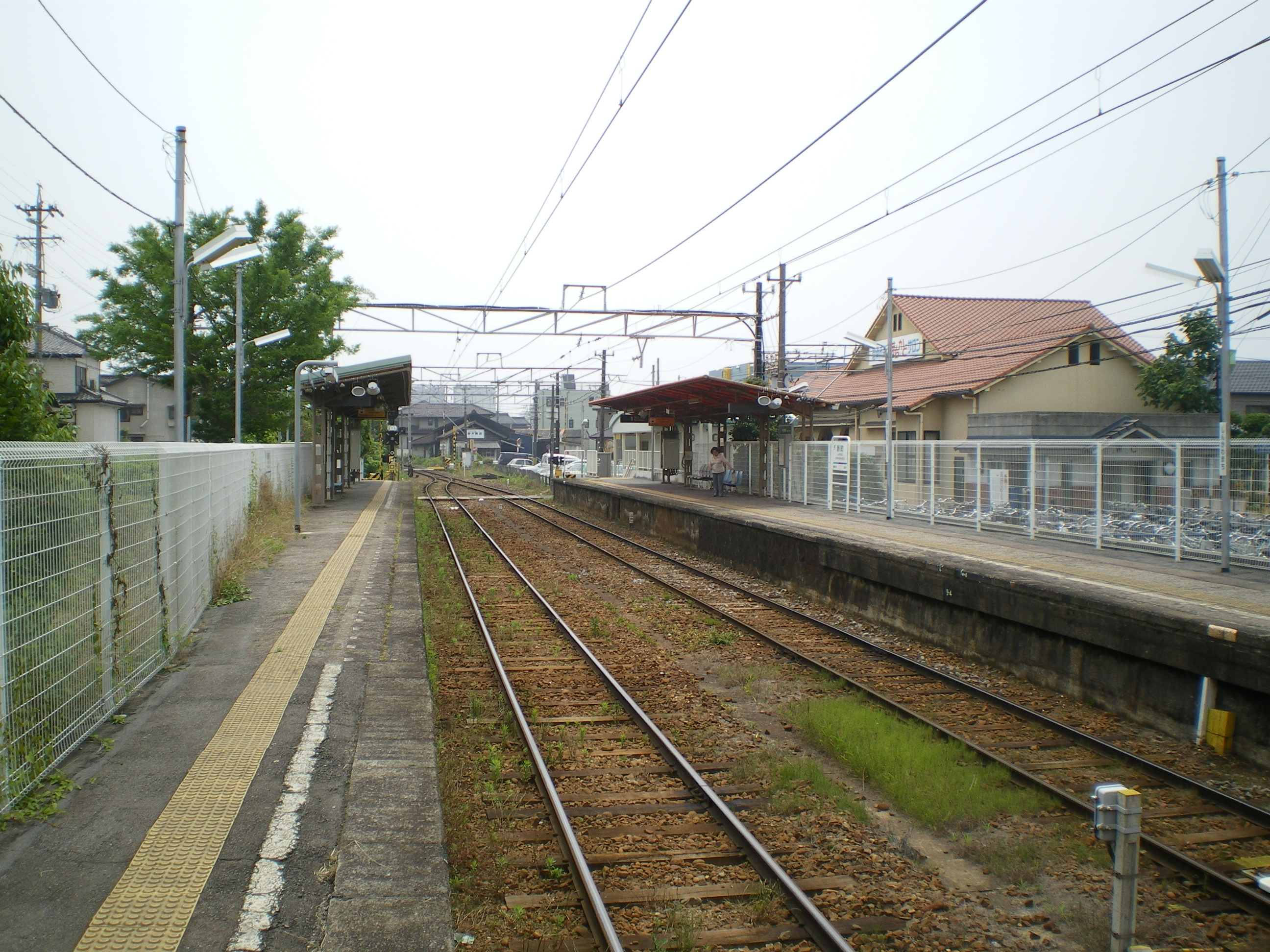
Platforms

Shinkawa-machi Station (新川町駅, Shinkawa-machi-eki) is a railway station in the city of Hekinan, Aichi Prefecture, Japan, operated by Meitetsu.

== Lines ==
Shinkawa-machi Station is served by the Meitetsu Mikawa Line, and is located 37.1 km (23.1 mi) from the starting point of the line at Sanage and 15.8 km (9.8 mi) from Chiryū.

== Station layout ==
The station has two opposed side platforms connected to the station building by a level crossing. The station has automatic turnstiles for the Tranpass system of magnetic fare cards, and is unattended.

=== Platforms ===
1	■ Mikawa Line	For Hekinan
2	■ Mikawa Line	For Mikawa Takahama, Kariya, and Chiryū

== Station history ==
Shinkawa-machi Station was opened on February 5, 1914, as a station on the privately owned Mikawa Railway Company. A spur line ran from this station to Shinkawaguchi Station (新川口駅, Shinkawaguchi-eki) from 1915 to 1955. The Mikawa Railway Company was taken over by Meitetsu on June 1, 1941. The station has been unattended since 2005.

== Passenger statistics ==
In fiscal 2017, the station was used by an average of 1298 passengers daily (boarding passengers only).

== Surrounding area ==
- Shinkawa Elementary School
- Shinkawa Junior High School
- Kobayashi Memorial Hospital

== See also ==
- List of railway stations in Japan
