= Kita Shinkawa Station =

Railway station in Hekinan, Aichi Prefecture, Japan

Kita Shinkawa Station 北新川駅

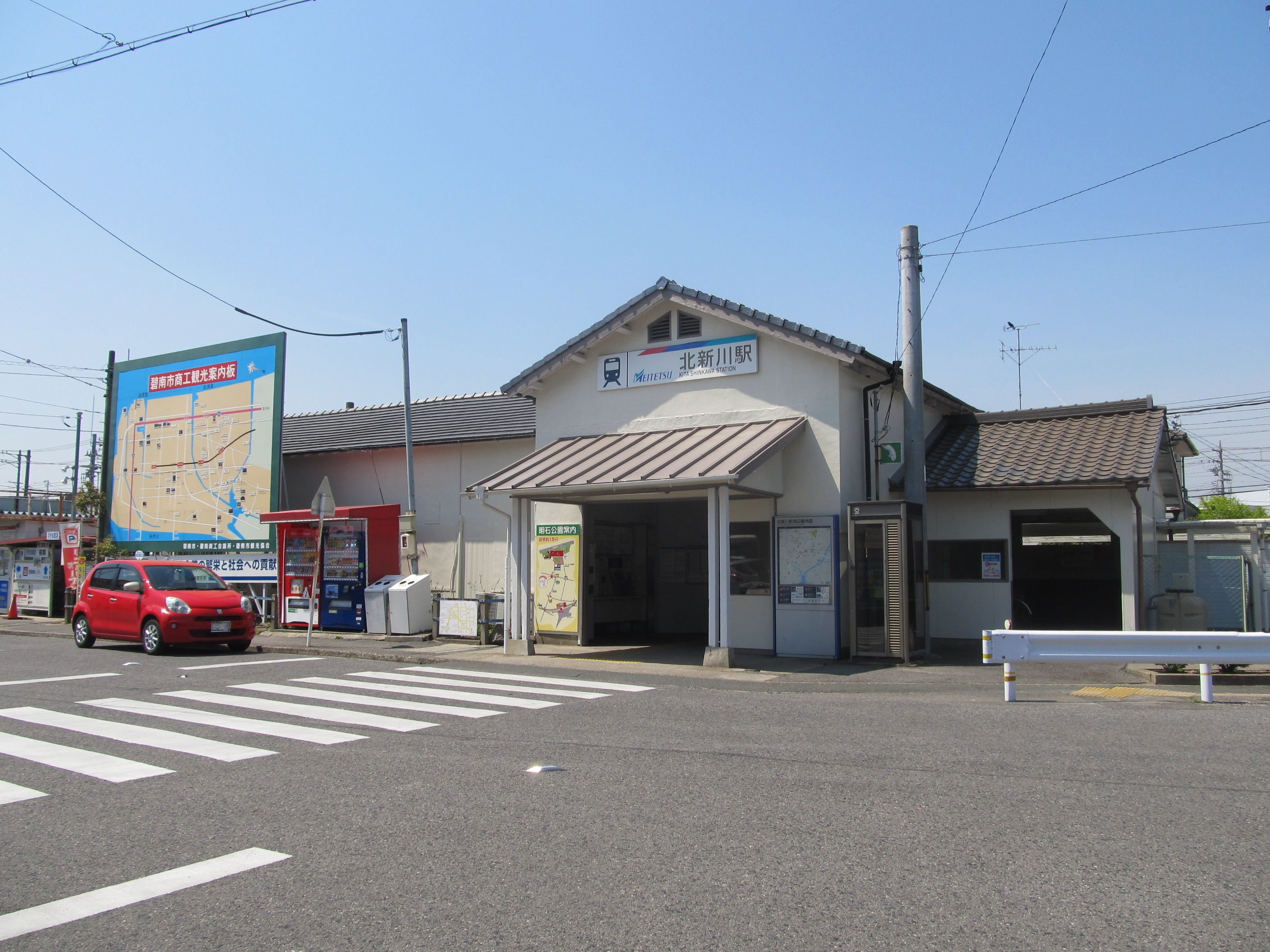
- Kita Shinkawa Station in April 2018

General information
- Location: Kugutsumachi 4-chome, Hekinan-shi, Aichi-ken 447-0065; Japan
- Coordinates: 34.9062°N 136.9924°E
- Operator: Meitetsu
- Line: ■ Meitetsu Mikawa Line
- Distance: 36.1 kilometers from Sanage
- Platforms: 1 island platform

Other information
- Status: Unstaffed
- Station code: MU08
- Website: Official website

History
- Opened: February 5, 1914

Passengers
- FY2017: 3144

Services
Preceding station	Meitetsu	Following station
Takahama-minato towards Chiryū	Mikawa Line Chiryū–Hekinan	Shinkawa-machi towards Hekinan
Location
- Location within Aichi Prefecture Location within Japan

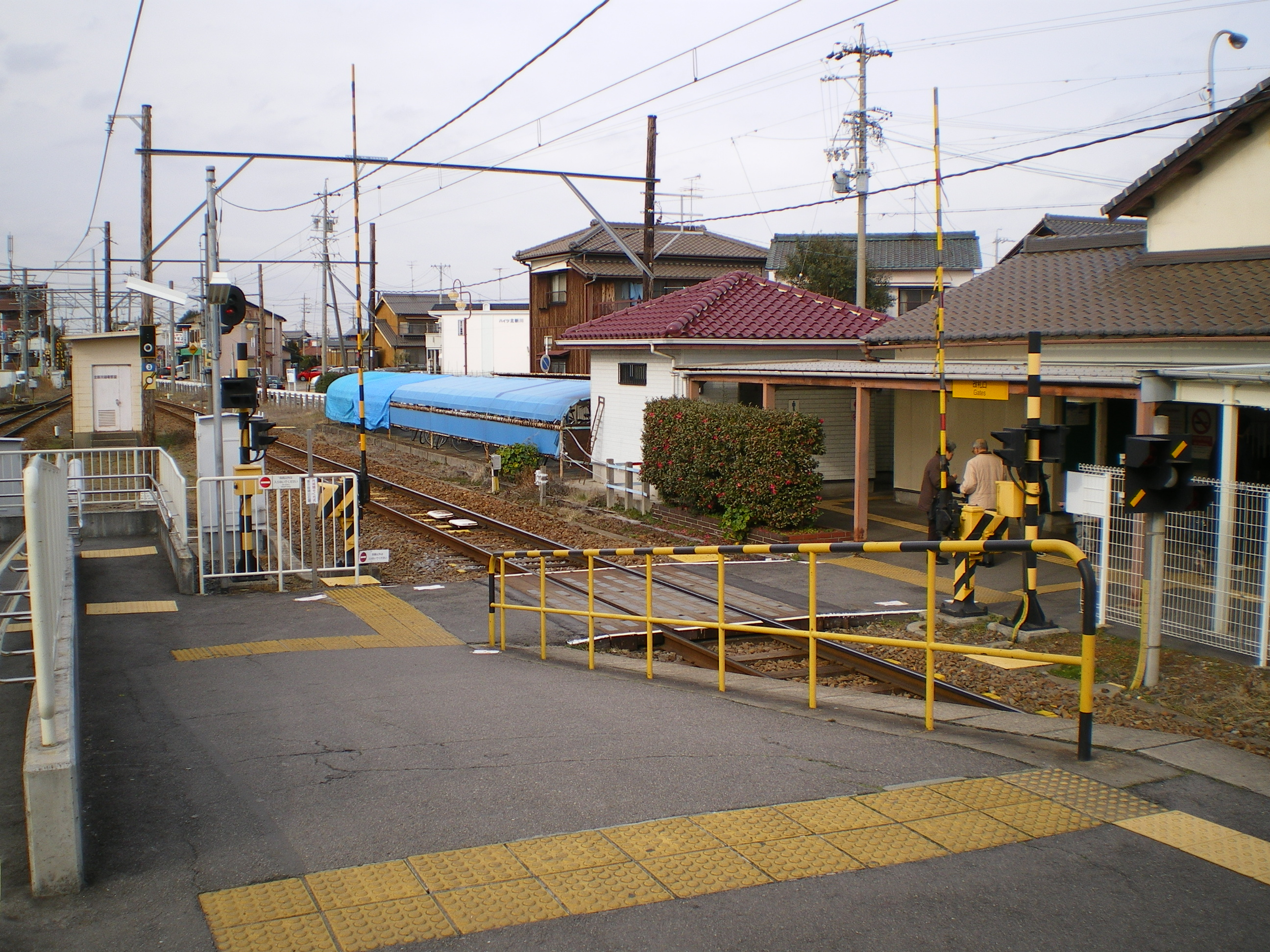
Level Crossing

Kita Shinkawa Station (北新川駅, Kita Shinkawa-eki) is a railway station in the city of Hekinan, Aichi Prefecture, Japan, operated by Meitetsu.

== Lines ==
Kita Shinkawa Station is served by the Meitetsu Mikawa Line, and is located 36.1 km (22.4 mi) from the starting point of the line at Sanage and 14.8 km (9.2 mi) from Chiryū.

== Station layout ==
The station has one island platforms connected to the station building by a level crossing. The station has automatic turnstiles for the Tranpass system of magnetic fare cards, and is unattended.

=== Platforms ===
1	■ Mikawa Line	For Hekinan
2	■ Mikawa Line	For Mikawa Takahama, Kariya, and Chiryū

== Station history ==
Kita Shinkawa Station was opened on February 5, 1914, as a station on the privately owned Mikawa Railway Company. The Mikawa Railway Company was taken over by Meitetsu on June 1, 1941. The station has been unattended since 2005.

== Passenger statistics ==
In fiscal 2017, the station was used by an average of 3144 passengers daily (boarding passengers only).

== Surrounding area ==
- Hekinan Public Library
- Hekinan Minami Technical High School

== See also ==
- List of railway stations in Japan
