= Takahama-minato Station =

Railway station in Takahama, Aichi Prefecture, Japan

Takahama-minato Station 高浜港駅

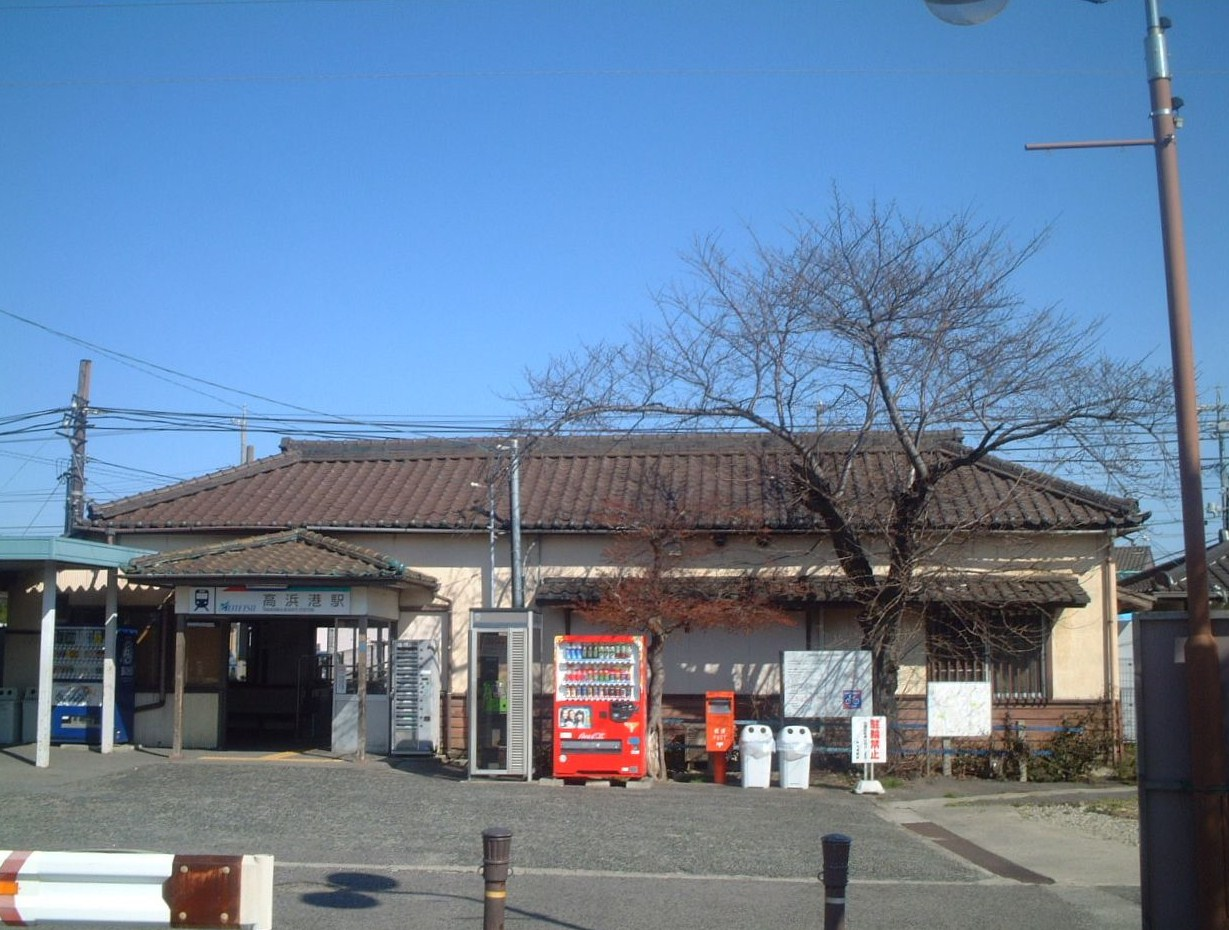
- Takahama-minato Station

General information
- Location: 6-3-1 Aokichō, Takahama-shi, Aichi-ken 444-1325; Japan
- Coordinates: 34.9215°N 136.9892°E
- Operator: Meitetsu
- Line: ■ Meitetsu Toyota Line
- Distance: 34.3 kilometers from Sanage
- Platforms: 1 side platform

Other information
- Status: Unstaffed
- Station code: MU07
- Website: Official website

History
- Opened: February 5, 1914

Passengers
- FY2017: 2501

Services
Preceding station	Meitetsu	Following station
Mikawa Takahama towards Chiryū	Mikawa Line Chiryū–Hekinan	Kita Shinkawa towards Hekinan
Location
- Location within Aichi Prefecture Location within Japan

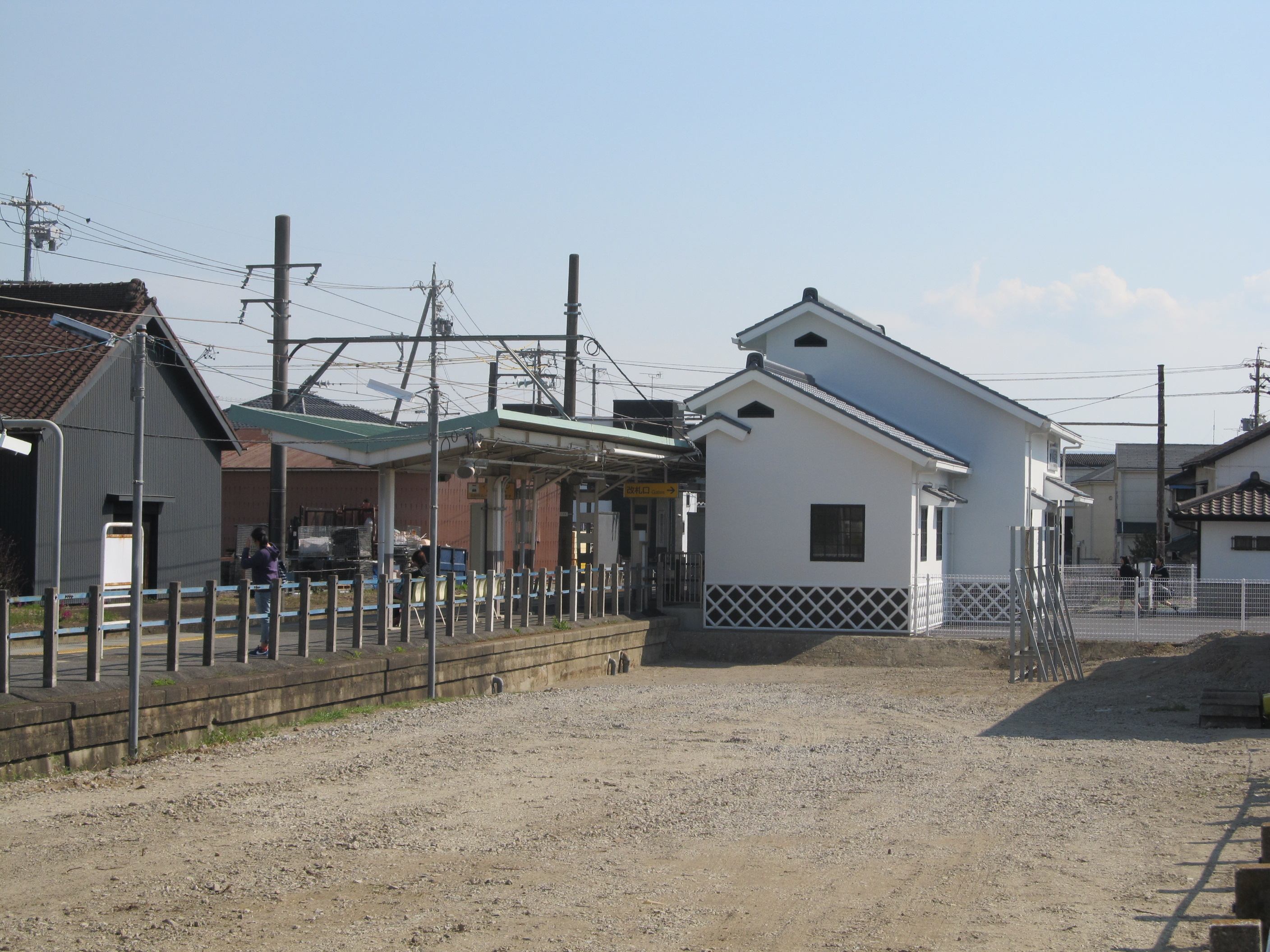
Platform

Takahama-minato Station (高浜港駅, Takahama-minato-eki) is a train station in the city of Takahama, Aichi Prefecture, Japan, operated by Meitetsu.

== Lines ==
Takahama-minato Station is served by the Meitetsu Mikawa Line, and is located 13 km (8.1 mi) from the starting point of the line at Chiryu and 34.3 km (21.3 mi) from Sanage.

== Station layout ==
The station has one side platform serving a single bi-directional track. The station has automated ticket machines, Manaca automated turnstiles and is unattended. The station also has a bookstore, a waiting room, a maintenance room, and a storage room.

== Station history ==
Takahama-minato Station was opened on February 5, 1914, as a station on the privately owned Mikawa Railway Company. The Mikawa Railway Company was taken over by Meitetsu on June 1, 1941. The station has been unattended since 2005.

== Passenger statistics ==
In fiscal 2017, the station was used by an average of 2,501 passengers daily.

== Surrounding area ==
- Minami Junior High School
- Takahama Junior High School

== See also ==
- List of railway stations in Japan
