= Mikawa Yatsuhashi Station =

Railway station in Toyota, Aichi Prefecture, Japan

Mikawa Yatsuhashi Station 三河八橋駅

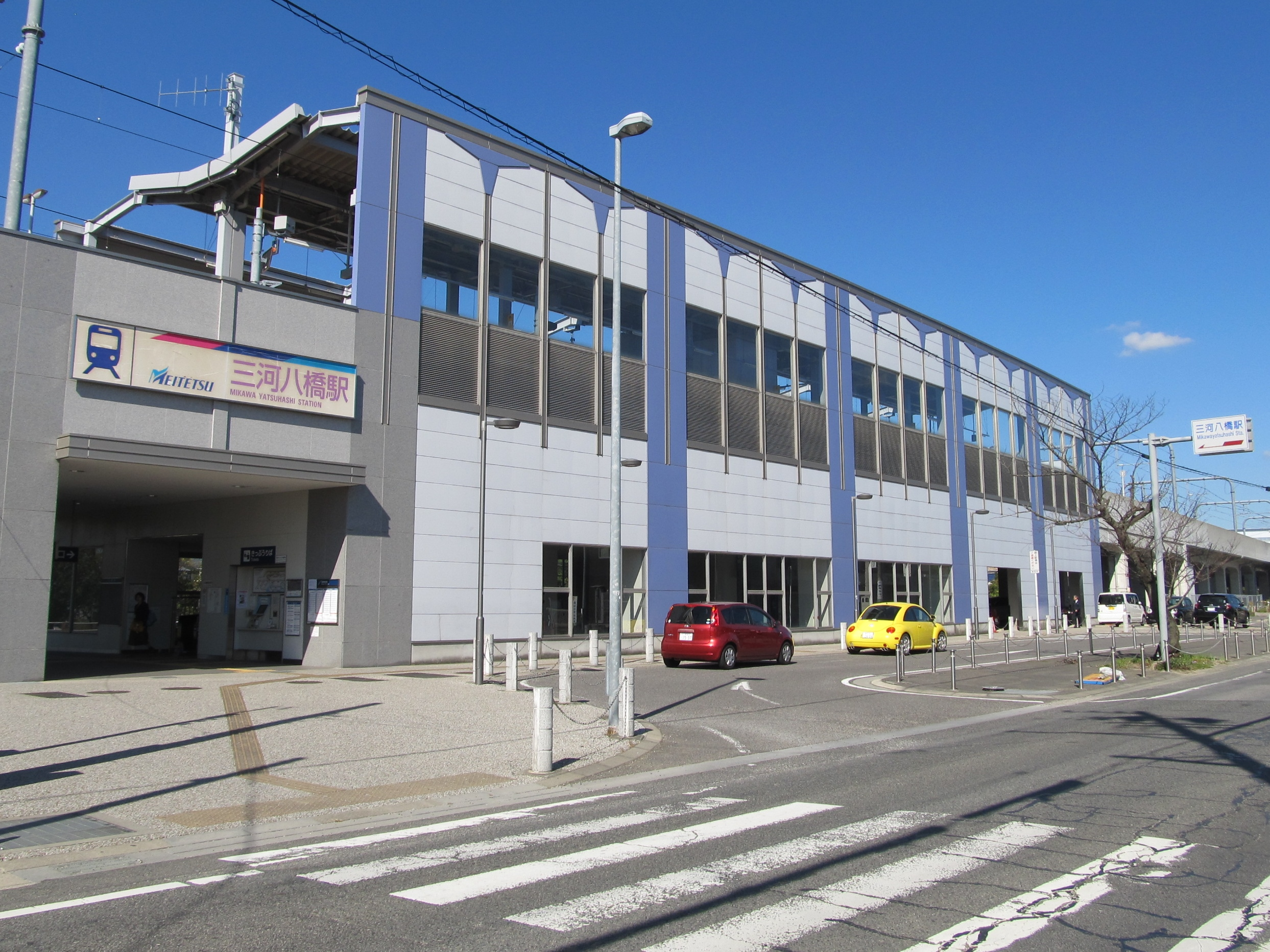
- Mikawa Yatsuhashi Station, October 2018

General information
- Location: Hanazono-cho Gotanda 39, Toyota-shi, Aichi-ken 473-0924; Japan
- Coordinates: 35.0107°N 137.0771°E
- Operator: Meitetsu
- Line: ■ Meitetsu Mikawa Line
- Distance: 3.8 kilometers from Chiryū
- Platforms: 1 island platform

Other information
- Status: Unstaffed
- Station code: MY02
- Website: Official website

History
- Opened: July 5, 1920

Passengers
- FY2017: 3337 daily

Services
Preceding station	Meitetsu	Following station
Wakabayashi towards Sanage	Mikawa Line Sanage–Chiryū	Mikawa Chiryū towards Chiryū
Location
- Location within Aichi Prefecture Location within Japan

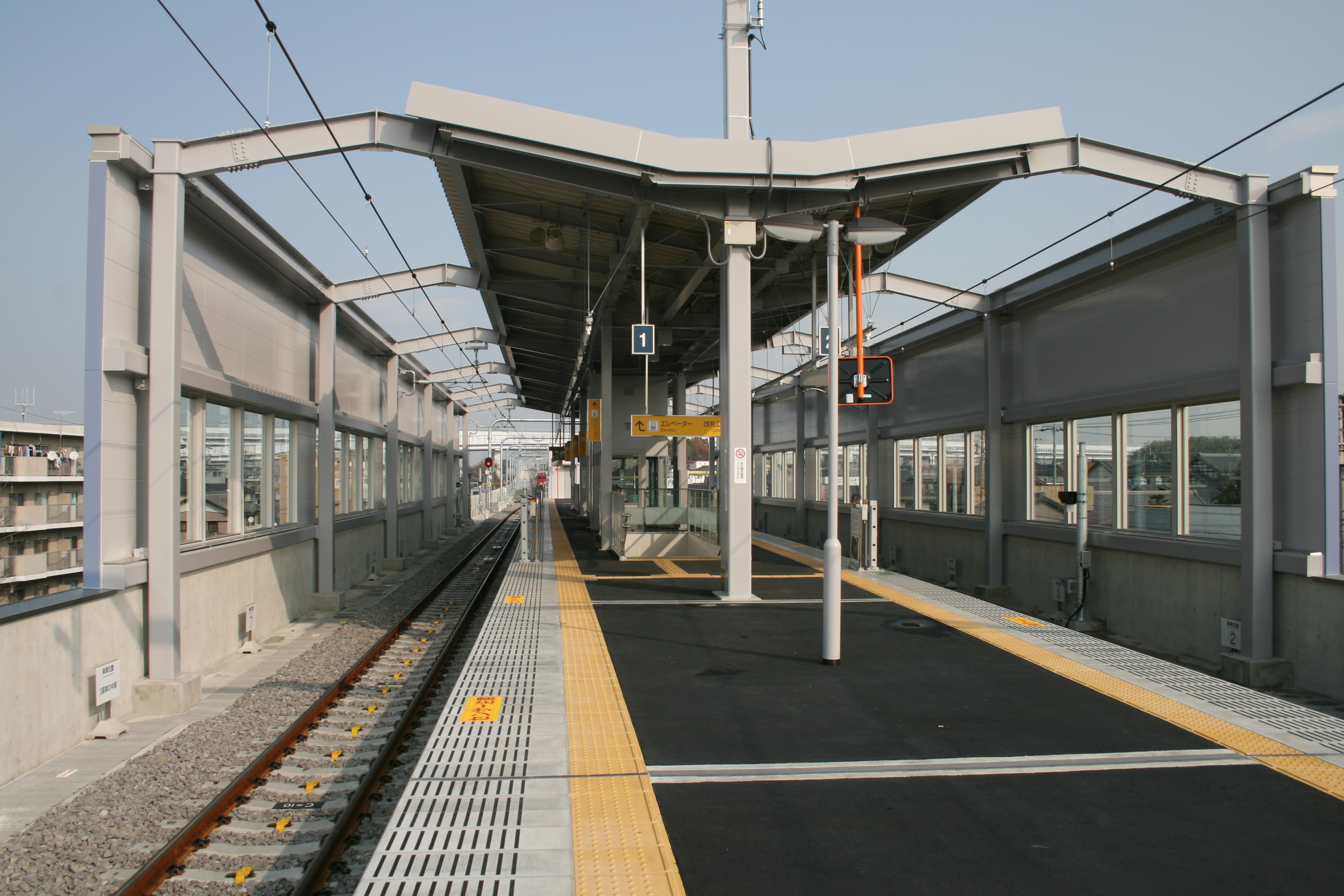
Platforms

Mikawa Yatsuhashi Station (三河八橋駅, Mikawa Yatsuhashi-eki) is a railway station in the city of Toyota, Aichi, Japan, operated by Meitetsu.

== Lines ==
Mikawa Yatsuhashi Station is served by the Meitetsu Mikawa Line and is 3.8 km (2.4 mi) from the terminus of the line at Chiryū Station.

== Station layout ==
track diagram

The station has a single elevated island platform with the station building underneath. The station has automated ticket machines, Manaca automated turnstiles and is unattended.

=== Platforms ===
1	■ Mikawa Line	For Toyotashi and Sanage
2	■ Mikawa Line	For Chiryū

== Station history ==
Mikawa Yatsuhashi Station was opened on July 5, 1920, as a station on the privately owned Mikawa Railway. The Mikawa Railway was merged with Meitetsu on June 1, 1941. The tracks were elevated and station building reconstructed from 2007 to 2009.

== Passenger statistics ==
In fiscal 2017, the station was used by an average of 3337 passengers daily (boarding passengers only).

== Surrounding area ==
- Wakazono Junior High School

== See also ==
- List of railway stations in Japan
