= Hirato-bashi Station =

Railway station in Toyota, Aichi Prefecture, Japan

Hirato-bashi Station 平戸橋駅

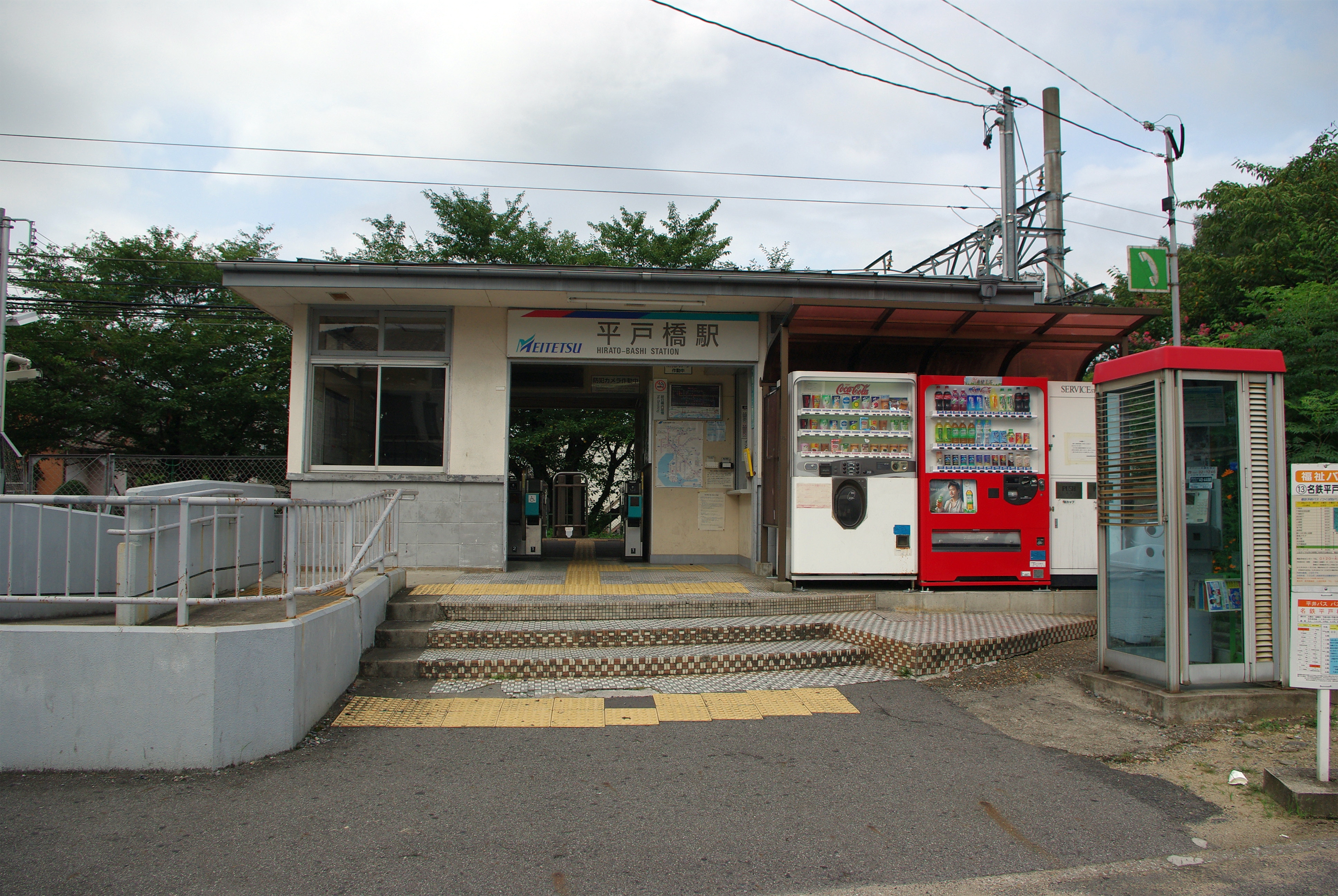
- Hirato-bashi Station in August 2009

General information
- Location: Hiratobashi-cho Ishihira 43, Toyota-shi, Aichi-ken 470-0331; Japan
- Coordinates: 35.1147°N 137.185°E
- Operator: Meitetsu
- Line: ■ Meitetsu Mikawa Line
- Distance: 20.2 kilometers from Chiryū
- Platforms: 1 side platform

Other information
- Status: Unstaffed
- Station code: MY10
- Website: Official website

History
- Opened: 31 October 1924; 101 years ago

Passengers
- FY2017: 1526 daily

Services
Preceding station	Meitetsu	Following station
Sanage Terminus	Mikawa Line Sanage–Chiryū	Koshido towards Chiryū
Location
- Location within Aichi Prefecture Location within Japan

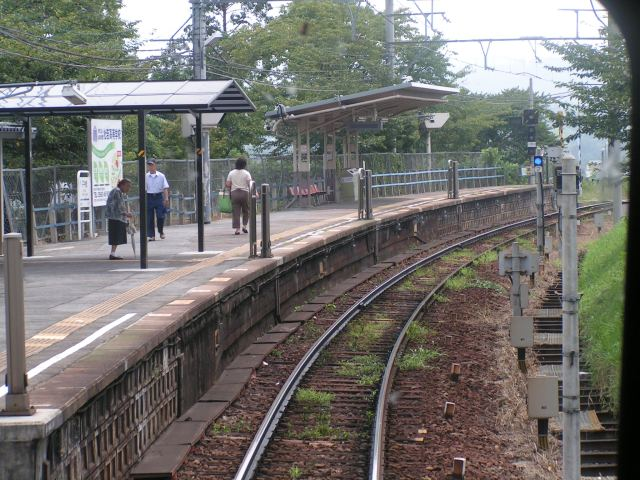
Platform

Hirato-bashi Station (平戸橋駅, Hirato-bashi-eki) is a railway station in the city of Toyota, Aichi, Japan, operated by Meitetsu.

== Lines ==
Hirato-bashi Station is served by the Meitetsu Mikawa Line and is 20.2 km (12.6 mi) from the terminus of the line at Chiryū Station.

== Station layout ==
The station has one side platform built on a curve, serving a single bi-directional track. The station has automated ticket machines, Manaca automated turnstiles and is unattended.

== Station history ==
Hiratobashi Station was opened on October 31, 1924, as a station on the privately owned Mikawa Railway. The Mikawa Railway was merged with Meitetsu on June 1, 1941. The station has been unattended since April 1, 1967.

== Passenger statistics ==
In fiscal 2017, the station was used by an average of 1526 passengers daily.

== Surrounding area ==
- Kanpachi Gorge
- Meitetsu Kosaku High School

== See also ==
- List of railway stations in Japan
