= Mikawa Chiryū Station =

Railway station in Chiryū, Aichi Prefecture, Japan

Mikawa Chiryū Station 三河知立駅

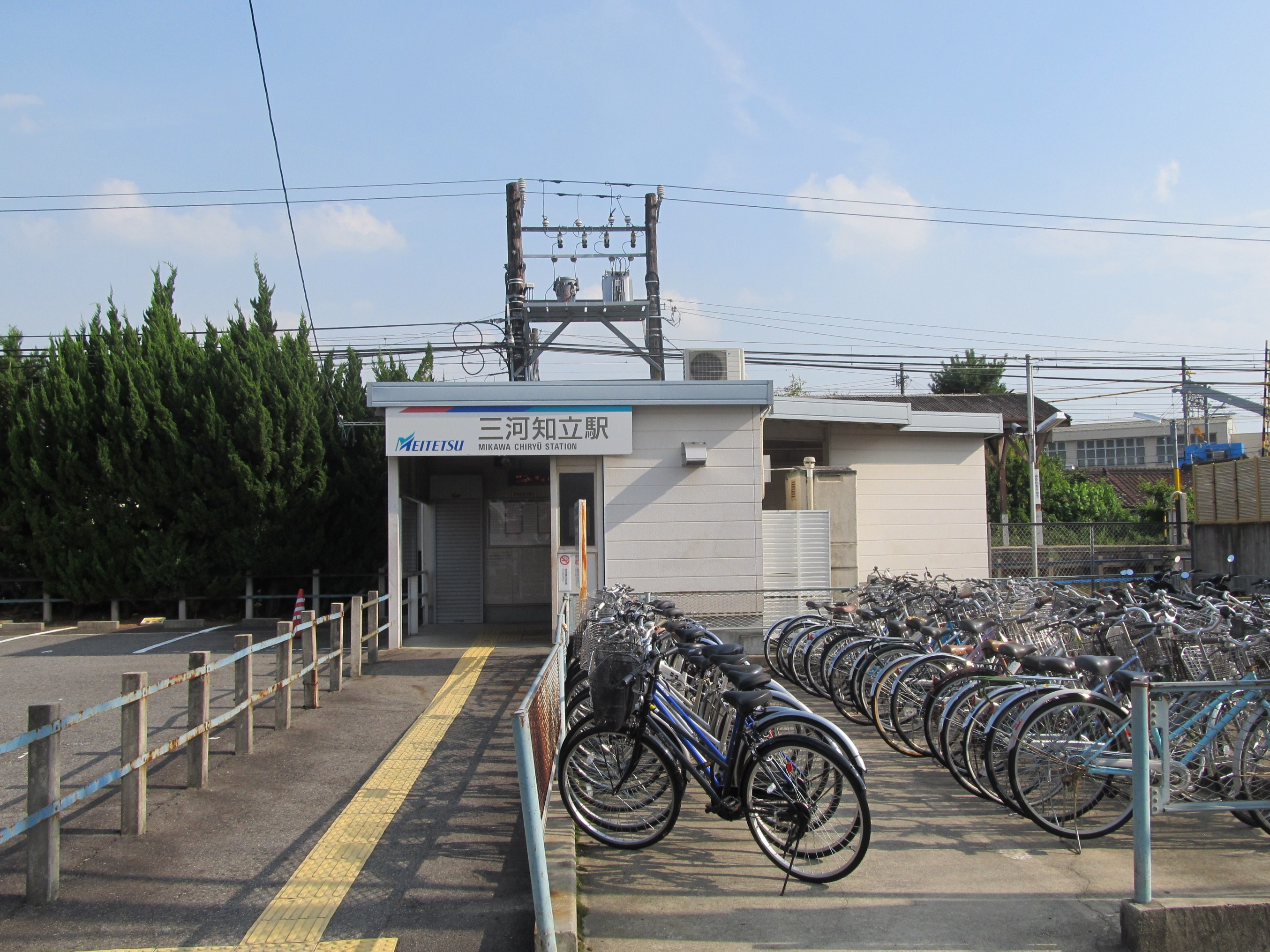
- Mikawa Chiryū Station in July 2013

General information
- Location: Shinchi-cho Kirado-higashi 1485, Chiryū-shi, Aichi-ken 472-0041; Japan
- Coordinates: 35.0040°N 137.0453°E
- Operator: Meitetsu
- Line: ■ Meitetsu Mikawa Line
- Distance: 0.7 kilometers from Chiryū
- Platforms: 1 side + 1 island platform

Other information
- Status: Unstaffed
- Station code: MY01
- Website: Official website

History
- Opened: October 28, 1915
- Former names: Chiryū (to 1959)

Passengers
- FY2017: 821 daily

Services
Preceding station	Meitetsu	Following station
Mikawa Yatsuhashi towards Sanage	Mikawa Line Sanage–Chiryū	Chiryū Terminus
Location
- Location within Aichi Prefecture Location within Japan

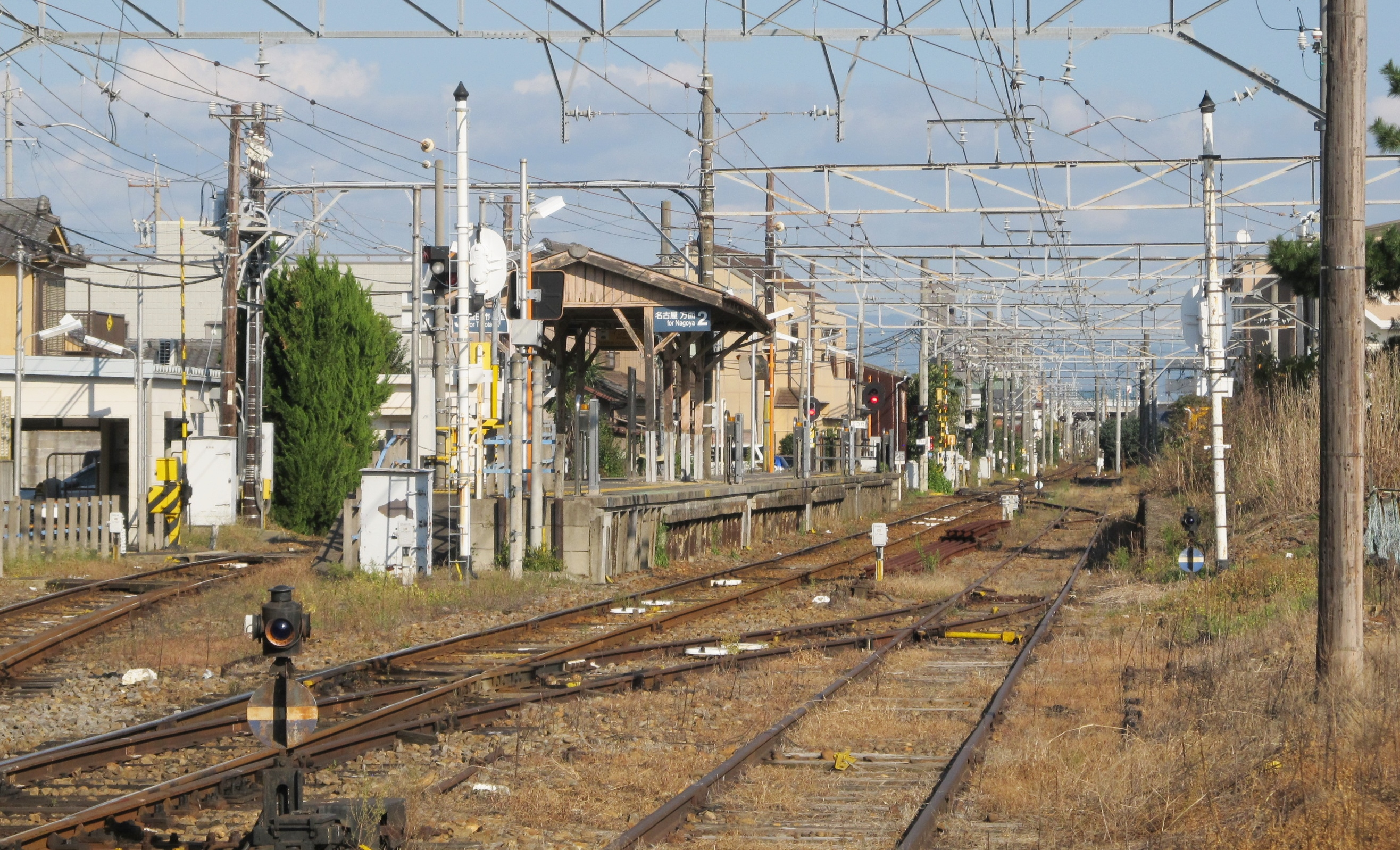
Platforms

Mikawa Chiryū Station (三河知立駅, Mikawa Chiryū-eki) is a railway station in the city of Chiryū, Aichi, Japan, operated by Meitetsu.

== Lines ==
Mikawa Chiryū Station is served by the Meitetsu Mikawa Line and is 0.7 km (0.43 mi) from the terminus of the line at Chiryū Station.

== Station layout ==
Mikawa Chiryū Station track diagram

The station has a single side platform and a single island platform, but only the island platform is in use. The platforms are connected by a level crossing The station has automated ticket machines, Manaca automated turnstiles and is staffed.

=== Platforms ===
1	■ Mikawa Line	Abandoned
2	■ Mikawa Line	For Chiryū
3	■ Mikawa Line	For Toyotashi and Sanage

== Station history ==
Mikawa Chiryū Station was opened on October 28, 1915 as Chiryū Station (知立駅, Chiryū-eki) on the privately owned Mikawa Railway. The Aichi Electric Railway Company opened Shin Chiryū Station (新知立駅, Shin Chiryū-eki) nearby on April 1, 1922. The two stations merged later that year. The Aichi Electric Railway Company was taken over by Meitetsu on August 1, 1935 (becoming the Meitetsu Nagoya Main Line, and the Mikawa Railway on June 1, 1941. A new station building was completed later the same year. The station was renamed to its present name on April 1, 1959, with the completion of the third generation station building. Operations of the Nagoya Main Line were discontinued.

Changes of the Chiryū Station

== Passenger statistics ==
In fiscal 2017, the station was used by an average of 821 passengers daily (boarding passengers only).

== Surrounding area ==
- Chiryū City Hall
- Chiryū High School

== See also ==
- List of railway stations in Japan
