= Shigehara Station =

Railway station in Chiryū, Aichi Prefecture, Japan

Shigehara Station 重原駅

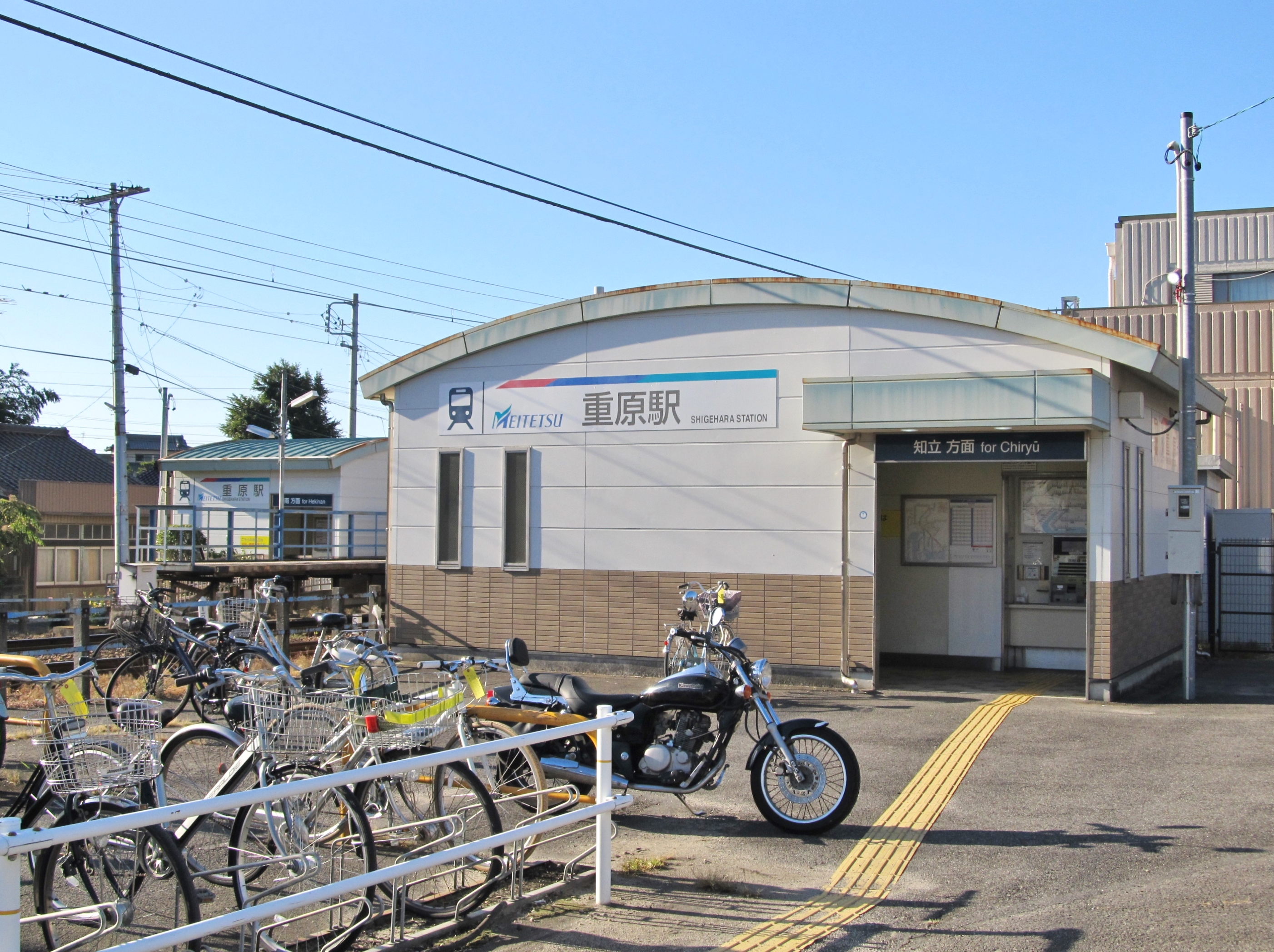
- Shigehara Station in October 2018

General information
- Location: Hongō-4 Kamishigeharachō, Chiryū-shi, Aichi-ken 472-0026; Japan
- Coordinates: 34.9949°N 137.0237°E
- Operator: Meitetsu
- Line: ■ Meitetsu Mikawa Line
- Distance: 2.2 kilometers from Chiryū
- Platforms: 2 side platforms

Other information
- Status: Unstaffed
- Station code: MU01
- Website: Official website

History
- Opened: April 6, 1923

Passengers
- FY2017: 855 daily

Services
Preceding station	Meitetsu	Following station
Chiryū Terminus	Mikawa Line Chiryū–Hekinan	Kariya towards Hekinan
Location
- Location within Aichi Prefecture Location within Japan

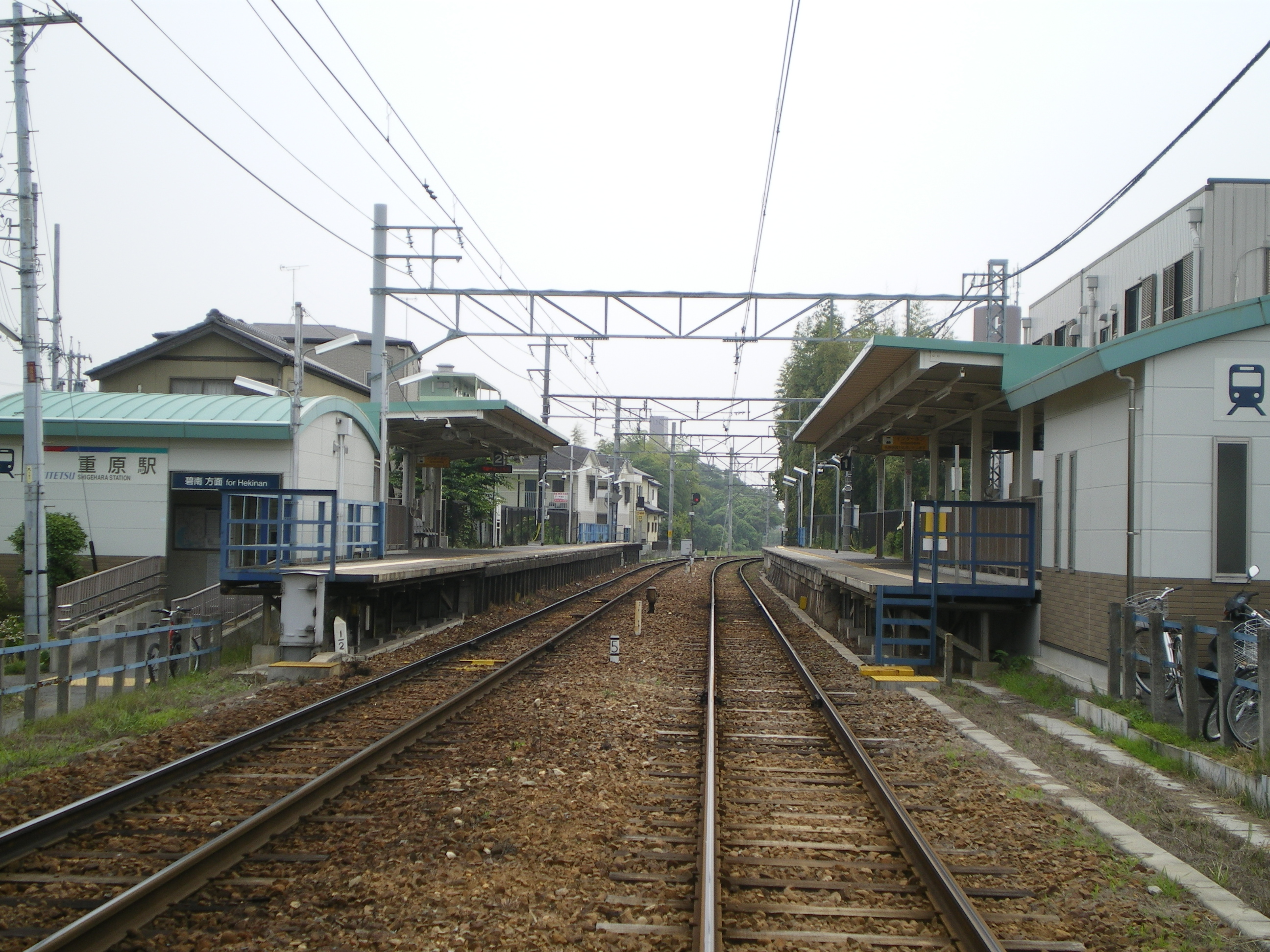
Platforms

Shigehara Station (重原駅, Shigehara-eki) is a railway station in the city of Chiryū, Aichi, Japan, operated by Meitetsu.

== Lines ==
Shigehara Station is served by the Meitetsu Mikawa Line and is 2.2 km (1.4 mi) from the terminus of the line at Chiryū Station.

== Station layout ==
Track Layout

The station has two opposed side platforms connected by a level crossing. The station is unattended.

=== Platforms ===
1	■ Mikawa Line	For Chiryū
2	■ Mikawa Line	For Kariya and Hekinan

== Station history ==
Shigehara Station was opened on April 6, 1923, as a station on the privately owned Mikawa Railway Company. The Mikawa Railway Company was taken over by Meitetsu on June 1, 1941. A new station building was completed in 2005.

== Passenger statistics ==
In fiscal 2017, the station was used by an average of 855 passengers daily (boarding passengers only).

== Surrounding area ==
- site of Shigehara Castle

== See also ==
- List of railway stations in Japan
