= Kariya Station =

Railway station in Kariya, Aichi Prefecture, Japan

CA58 Kariya Station 刈谷駅

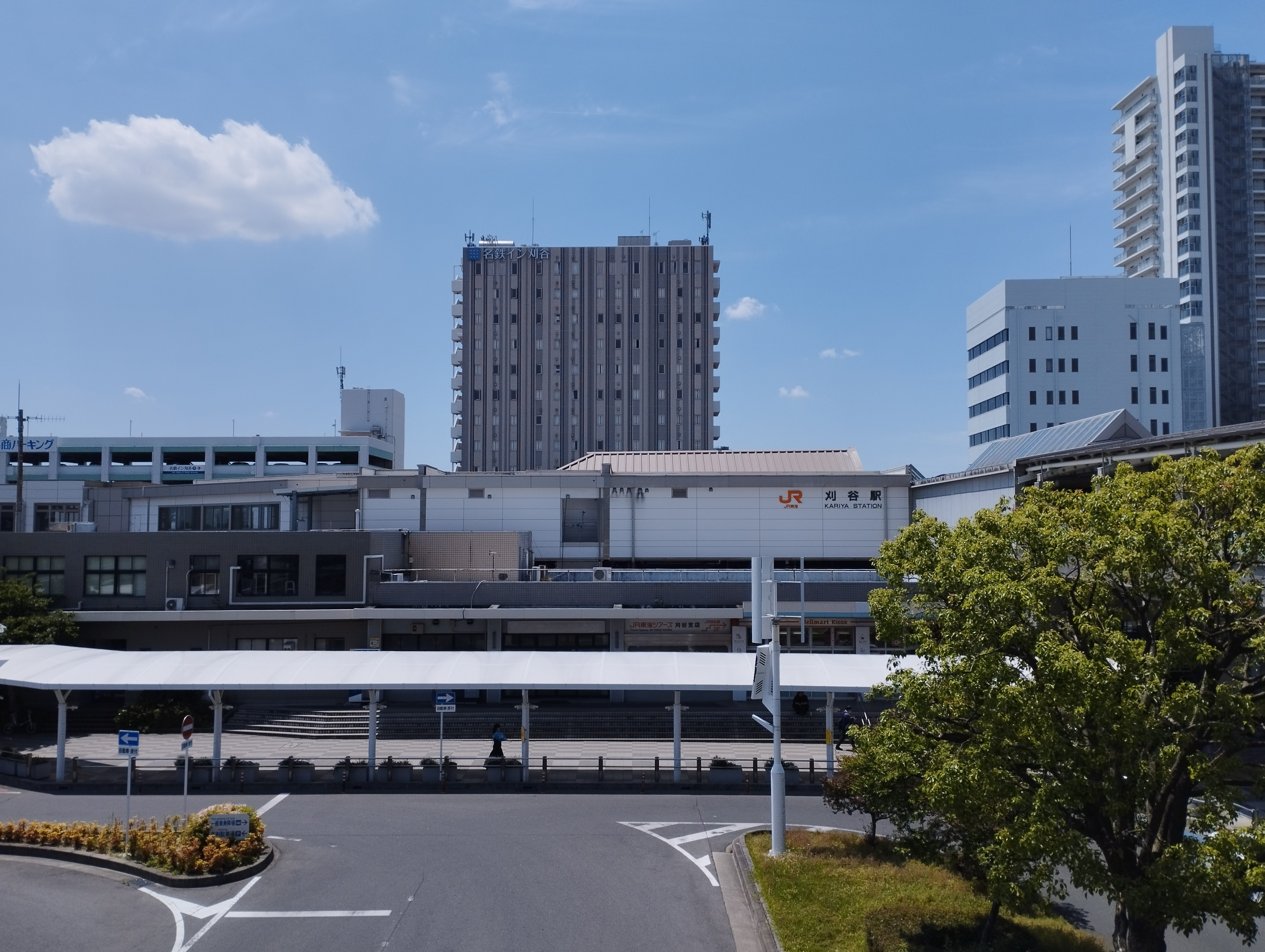
- Kariya Station at May 2023

General information
- Location: 1-55 Sakuramachi, Kariya-shi, Aichi-ken 448-0028; Japan
- Coordinates: 34.9911736°N 137.0088887°E
- Operator: JR Central; Meitetsu
- Lines: Tokaido Main Line; ■ Meitetsu Mikawa Line
- Distance: 341.6 kilometers from Tokyo
- Platforms: 3 island platforms

Other information
- Status: Staffed
- Station code: CA58
- Website: Official website JR; Official website Meitetsu

History
- Opened: September 1, 1888

Passengers
- 2023–2024: 56,296 daily (JR); 23,364 daily (Meitetsu)

Services
| Preceding station | Meitetsu | Following station |
|---|---|---|
| Shigehara towards Chiryū | Mikawa Line Chiryū–Hekinan | Kariyashi towards Hekinan |
| Preceding station | JR Central | Following station |
| Kanayama towards Maibara | Tōkaidō Main Line Special Rapid | Anjō towards Atami |
| Ōbu towards Maibara | Tōkaidō Main Line New Rapid Rapid Semi Rapid | Anjō towards Atami |
| Noda-Shinmachi towards Maibara | Tōkaidō Main Line Local | Aizuma towards Atami |
Location
- Location within Aichi Prefecture Location within Japan

Kariya Station (刈谷駅, Kariya-eki) is a railway station in the city of Kariya, Aichi Prefecture, Japan, jointly operated by Central Japan Railway Company (JR Central) and the private railway operator Meitetsu.

== Overview ==
Kariya Station is served by the Tōkaidō Main Line, and is located 346.1 km (215.1 mi) from the starting point of the line at Tokyo Station. It is also served by the Meitetsu Mikawa Line and is 25.2 km (15.7 mi) from the terminus of that line at Sanage Station and 3.6 km (2.2 mi) from Chiryū.

== History ==
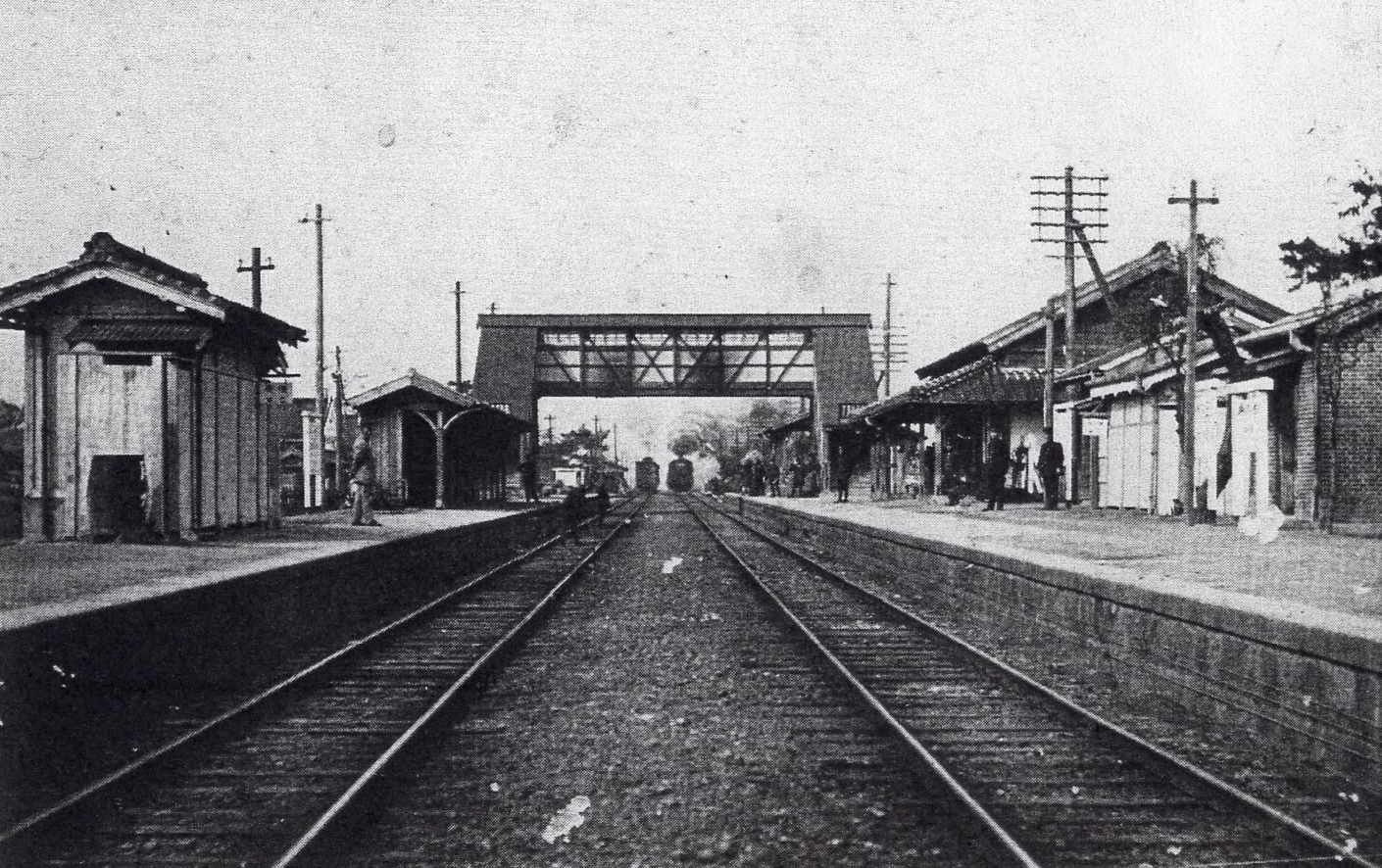
Kariya Station circa 1921

Kariya Station opened on September 1, 1888, when the section of the Japanese Government Railways (JGR) connecting Hamamatsu Station with Ōbu Station was completed. This line was named the Tōkaidō Line in 1895 and the Tōkaidō Main Line in 1909. On February 5, 1914, the privately owned Mikawa Railway built a station for the Mikawa Line adjacent to this station, and named it Kariya-shin Station (刈谷新駅). The two stations were merged on February 10, 1927. The Mikawa Railway became part of Meitetsu in 1941, and the JGR became the Japanese National Railways (JNR) after World War II. All freight operations were shifted to the nearby Kariya Container Center in 1986. With the privatization and dissolution of the JNR on April 1, 1987, the station came under the control of JR Central.

Station numbering was introduced to the section of the Tōkaidō Line operated JR Central in March 2018; Kariya Station was assigned station number CA58.

== Station layout ==
Kariya Station track diagram. Black: JR Central Tōkaidō Main Line Red: Meitetsu Mikawa Line

=== JR ===
The JR station consists of two elevated island platforms serving four tracks, with the station building underneath, The station building has automated ticket machines, TOICA automated turnstiles and is staffed.

| 1-2 | ■ Tōkaidō Main Line | for Okazaki and Toyohashi |
| 3-4 | ■ Tōkaidō Main Line | for Ōbu and Nagoya |

=== Meitetsu ===
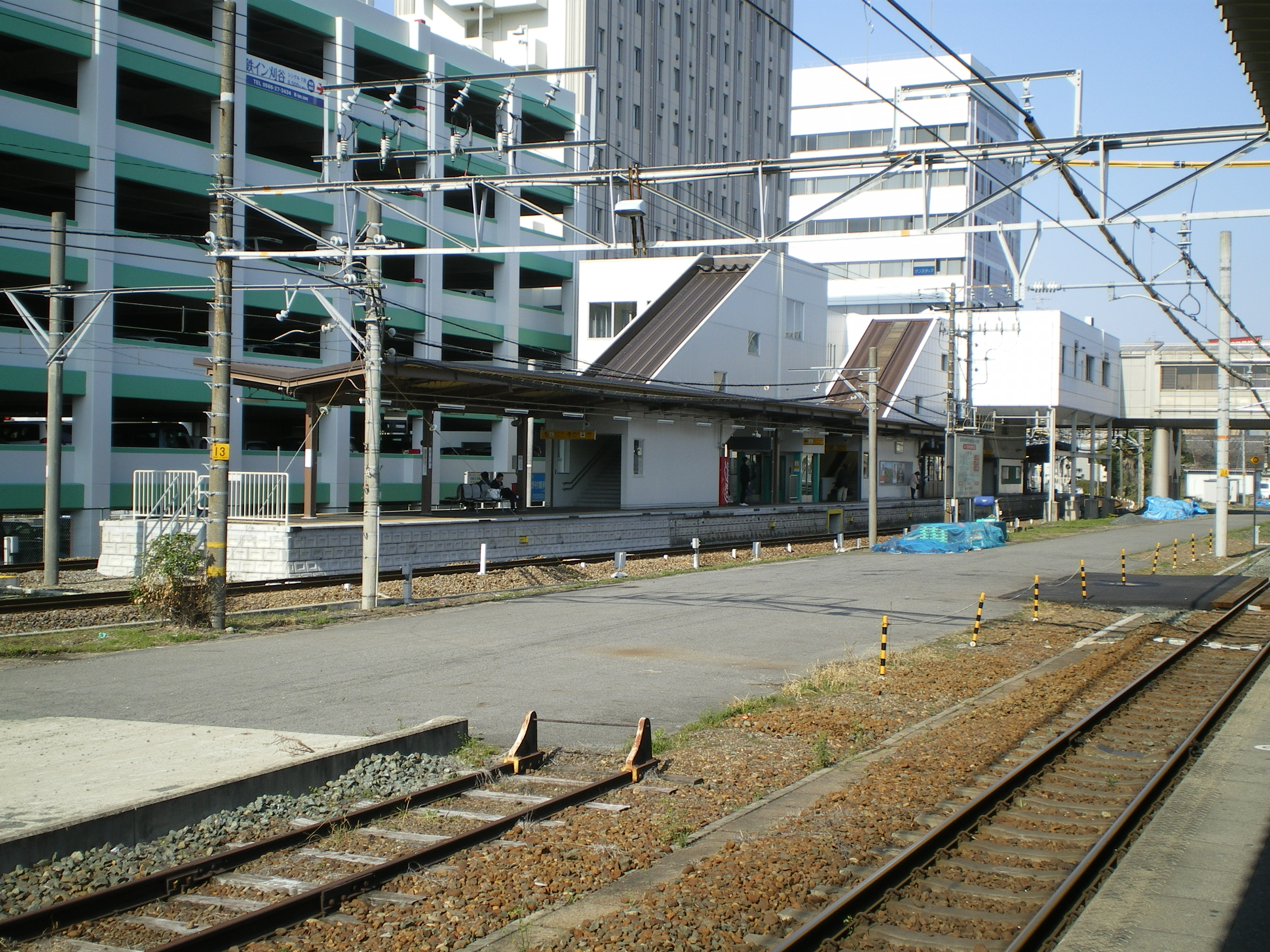
The Meitetsu platform

The Meitetsu station consists of a single ground-level island platform connected to the JR portion of the station by a footbridge. The station has automatic turnstiles for manaca, and is staffed.

| 1 | ■ Mikawa Line | for Chiryū |
| 2 | ■ Mikawa Line | for Mikawa Takahama and Hekinan |

== Passenger statistics ==
In fiscal 2017, the JR portion of the station was used by an average of 35,077 passengers daily (arriving passengers only) and the Meitetsu portion of the station was used by 27,483 passengers (daily).

== See also ==
- List of railway stations in Japan
