= Meitetsu Mikawa Line =

Railway line in Aichi prefecture, Japan

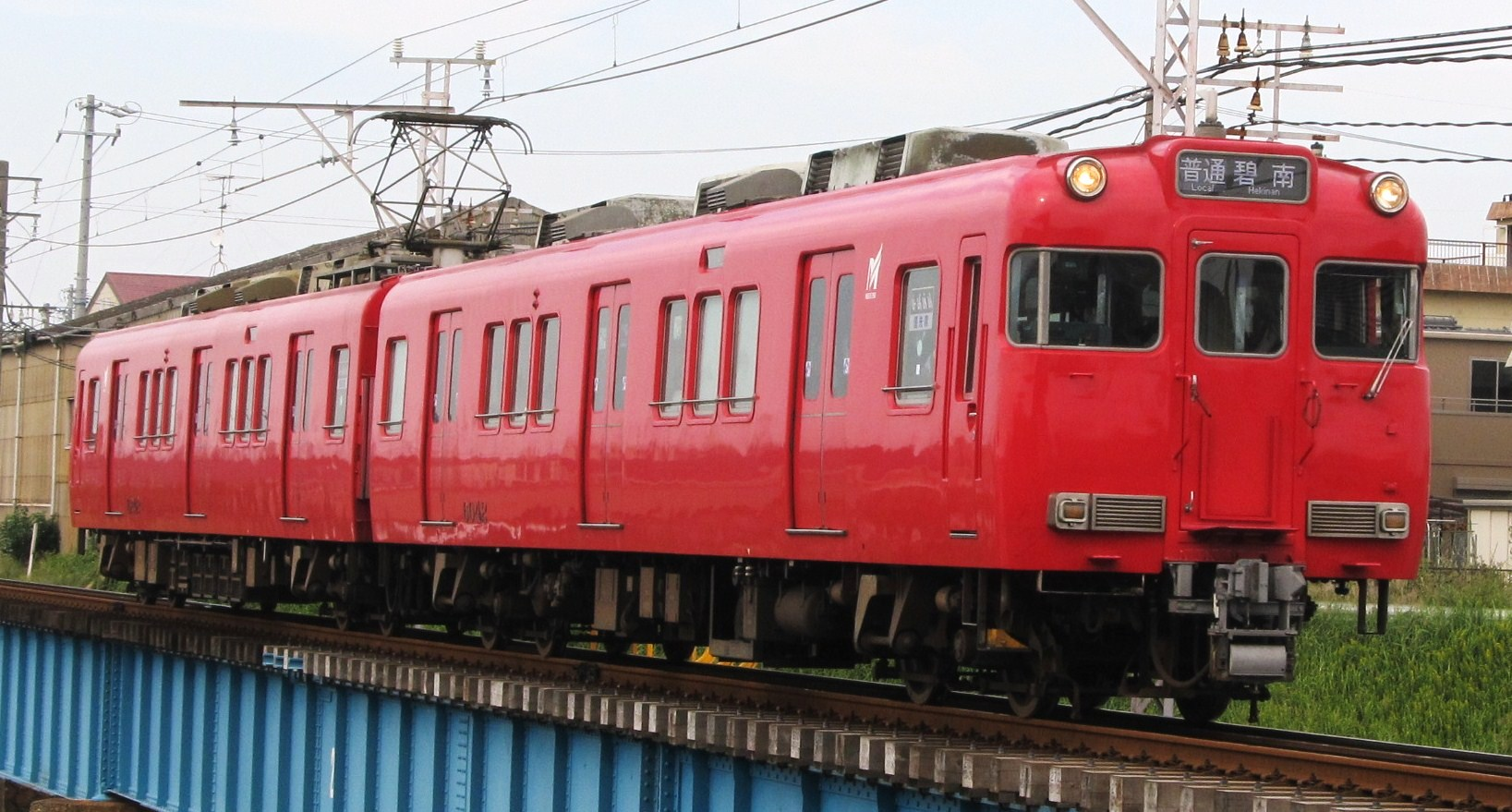
- A 6000 series EMU on the Meitetsu Mikawa Line

Overview
- Native name: 名鉄三河線
- Owner: Meitetsu
- Locale: Aichi Prefecture
- Termini: Sanage; Hekinan
- Stations: 23

Service
- Type: Commuter rail
- Daily ridership: 73,556 (FY2003)

History
- Opened: 1914; 112 years ago

Technical
- Line length: 39.8 km (24.73 mi)
- Track gauge: 1,067 mm (3 ft 6 in)
- Electrification: 1,500V DC, overhead catenary
- Operating speed: 80 km/h (50 mph)

The Meitetsu Mikawa Line (名鉄三河線, Meitetsu Mikawa-sen) is a 39.8 km (24.7 mi) railway line in Aichi Prefecture, Japan, operated by the private railway operator Nagoya Railroad (Meitetsu) connecting Sanage Station in Toyota and Hekinan Station in Hekinan. It originally extended beyond Hekinan to Kira Yoshida, and beyond Sanage to Nishi Nakagane, with a proposed extension to Asuke substantially constructed but subsequently abandoned (see History section below).

All trains on this line operate as Local trains and stop at every station. Some smaller stations have only a single platform and no passing loop.

== History ==
The Mikawa Railway opened the Ōhama-minato (now Hekinan) to Kariya-shin (now Kariya) section in 1914, and extended the line to Chiryū (old, now Mikawa Chiryū) the following year, to Koromo (now Toyotashi) in 1920 and Sanage in 1924.

In 1926, the Sanage to Hekinan section was electrified at 1,500 V DC, and in the same year the (now closed) Hekinan to Matsukijima section opened as an electrified section, as were all subsequent extensions.

The (now closed) Sanage to Nishi Nakagane section opened between 1927 and 1928, and the Matsukijima - Mikawa Yoshida section also opened in the latter year.

The company merged with Nagoya Railroad (Meitetsu) in June 1941, and the Mikawa Yoshida - Kira Yoshida section opened in 1943, connecting to the Gamagōri Line and the Nishio Line.

Construction of an ~8 km (5 mi) extension from Nishi Nakagane to Asuke had commenced in the 1930s, with the roadbed completed when the Pacific War commenced. Shortage of materials resulted in the rail line never being laid, and the proposed extension was formally abandoned in 1958, with the roadbed being converted to a public road, which is readily identifiable on aerial photographs.

Freight services ceased in 1984, and as a result of declining patronage, the electrification on the Sanage - Nishi Nakagane section was decommissioned in 1985, and on the Hekinan to Kira Yoshida section in 1990, DMUs then providing the passenger service. Patronage continued to decline, and both sections were closed in 2004.

=== Double-tracking ===
The Chiryū to Shigehara section was double-tracked in 1976, the Kariya to Kariyashi section in 1980, and the Umetsubo to Toyotashi section in 1986. The doubling of the Toyotashi to Chiryū section is proposed, and some works have been undertaken, but funding issues with the local governments has stalled further work at present. The land has been acquired to double the Shigehara to Kariya section, but Meitetsu does not consider the patronage levels on this section justify duplication at this stage.

=== Former connecting lines ===
- Uwagoromo Station: The Okazaki Electric Railway opened a 7 km (4.3 mi) line, electrified at 600 V DC, from Okazaki-Ida to Modachi in 1924. The line was proposed to continue to Matsudaira, but the company encountered financial difficulties and merged with the Mikawa Railway in 1927, which opened the Uwa Goromo to Mikawa Iwawaki section two years later, and converted the line to 1,500 V DC. In 1939, the Mikawa Iwawaki to Modachi section closed (Modachi Branch Line), and in 1941, the company merged with Meitetsu. The Okazaki-Ida to Daijuji section closed in 1962, and as a result of flood damage caused by torrential rain, the balance of the line closed in 1972. At Okazaki-Ida, there was a connection to a 6 km (3.7 mi) tram line that connected to the Tokaido Main Line at Okazaki station, the tramway also closing in 1962.

== Stations ==
No.	Name	Japanese	Distance (km)	Connections	Location	
MY11	Sanage	猿投	0.0		Toyota	Aichi
MY10	Hiratobashi	平戸橋	1.1		Toyota	Aichi
MY09	Koshido	越戸	2.2		Toyota	Aichi
MY08	Umetsubo	梅坪	4.2	Meitetsu: TT Toyota Line (some through connections)	Toyota	Aichi
MY07	Toyotashi	豊田市	5.6	Aichi Loop Line (via Shin-Toyota)	Toyota	Aichi
MY06	Uwa Goromo	上挙母	7.4	Aichi Loop Line (via Shin-Uwagoromo)	Toyota	Aichi
MY05	Tsuchihashi	土橋	10.2		Toyota	Aichi
MY04	Takemura	竹村	12.8		Toyota	Aichi
MY03	Wakabayashi	若林	15.1		Toyota	Aichi
MY02	Mikawa Yatsuhashi	三河八橋	17.5		Toyota	Aichi
MY01	Mikawa Chiryū	三河知立	20.6		Chiryū	Aichi
NH19	Chiryū	知立	21.3	Meitetsu: NH Nagoya Main Line	Chiryū	Aichi
MU01	Shigehara	重原	23.5		Chiryū	Aichi
MU02	Kariya	刈谷	25.2	JR Central: Tokaido Main Line	Kariya	Aichi
MU03	Kariyashi	刈谷市	26.8		Kariya	Aichi
MU04	Ogakie	小垣江	29.4		Kariya	Aichi
MU05	Yoshihama	吉浜	31.4		Takahama	Aichi
MU06	Mikawa Takahama	三河高浜	33.3		Takahama	Aichi
MU07	Takahama Minato	高浜港	34.3		Takahama	Aichi
MU08	Kitashinkawa	北新川	36.1		Hekinan	Aichi
MU09	Shinkawamachi	新川町	37.1		Hekinan	Aichi
MU10	Hekinan Chūō	碧南中央	38.2		Hekinan	Aichi
MU11	Hekinan	碧南	39.8		Hekinan	Aichi

== See also ==
- List of railway lines in Japan
