= Takahama, Aichi =

Takahama 高浜市
- City
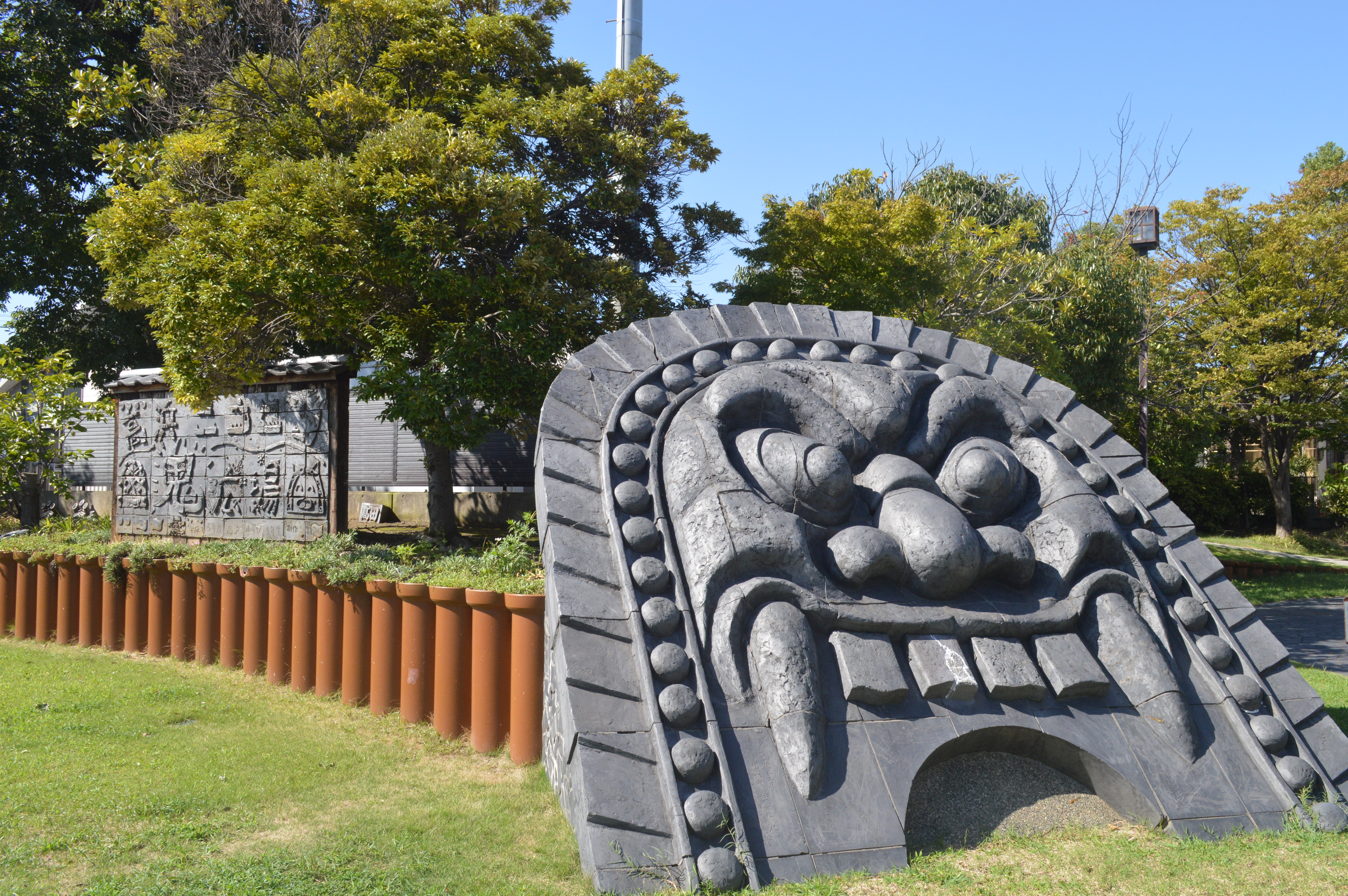
- Sanshu Roof Tiles

- Flag Emblem

- Location of Takahama in Aichi Prefecture

- Coordinates: 34°55′39″N 136°59′16″E
- Country: Japan
- Region: Chūbu (Tōkai)
- Prefecture: Aichi

Government

Area
  - Total: 13.11 km^{2} (5.06 sq mi)

Population (October 1, 2019)
  - Total: 48,736
  - Density: 3,717/km^{2} (9,628/sq mi)
- Time zone: UTC+9 (Japan Standard Time)
- Tree: Cinnamomum camphora
- Flower: Chrysanthemum
- Phone number: 0566-52-1111
- Address: Aoki-chō, Tahakama-shi, Aichi-ken 444-1398
- Website: Official website

Takahama (高浜市, Takahama-shi) is a city located in central Aichi Prefecture, Japan. As of 1 October 2019, the city had an estimated population of 48,736 in 20,500 households, and a population density of 3,717 persons per km^{2}. The total area of the city is 13.11 square kilometres (5.06 sq mi).

== Geography ==
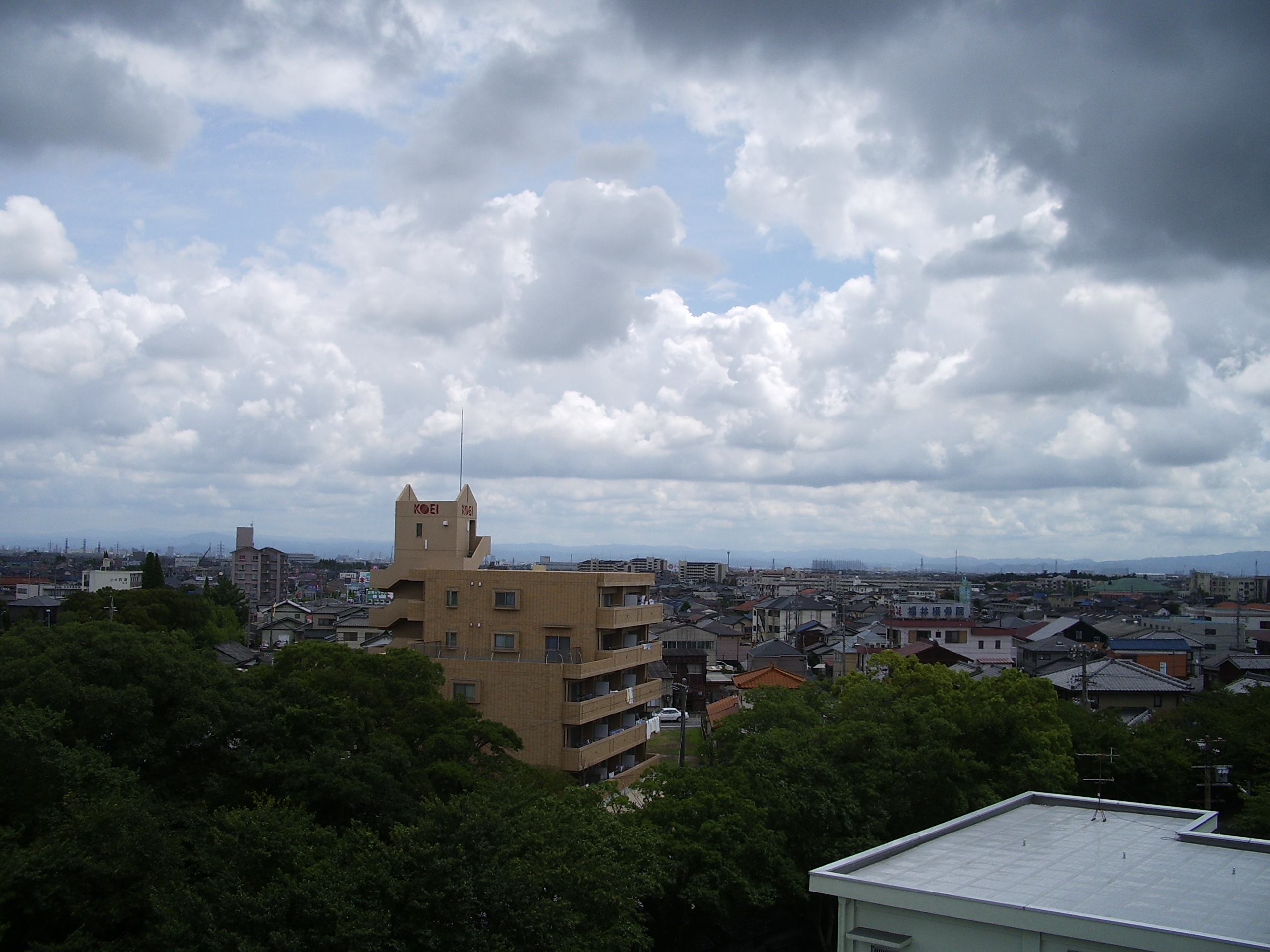
Skyline of Tahara City from Ooyama Park

Takahama is situated in south-central Aichi Prefecture, on Kinuura Bay at the head of Atsumi Peninsula.

=== Climate ===
The city has a climate characterized by hot and humid summers, and relatively mild winters (Köppen climate classification Cfa). The average annual temperature in Takahama is 15.7 °C. The average annual rainfall is 1592 mm with September as the wettest month. The temperatures are highest on average in August, at around 27.8 °C, and lowest in January, at around 4.4 °C.

=== Demographics ===
Per Japanese census data, the population of Takahama has been relatively steady over the past 50 years.

Historical population
Year	Pop.	±%
1940	14,819	—
1950	19,120	+29.0%
1960	20,853	+9.1%
1970	31,102	+49.1%
1980	31,548	+1.4%
1990	33,478	+6.1%
2000	38,127	+13.9%
2010	43,983	+15.4%

=== Neighboring municipalities ===
Aichi Prefecture

- Anjō
- Handa
- Hekinan
- Higashiura
- Kariya

== History ==
=== Late modern period ===
Takahama Village was created within Hekikai District on October 1, 1889. It was raised to town status on July 9, 1900, and annexed neighboring Yoshihama and Takatori villages on May 1, 1906.

=== Contemporary history ===
In 1956, Kinuura bridge, connecting Takahama and Handa was opened.

Takahama was raised to city status on December 1, 1970, causing Hekikai District to cease to exist, along with Higashi-Kasugai District which ceased to exist following the elevation of Owariasahi to city status at the same date.

== Government ==
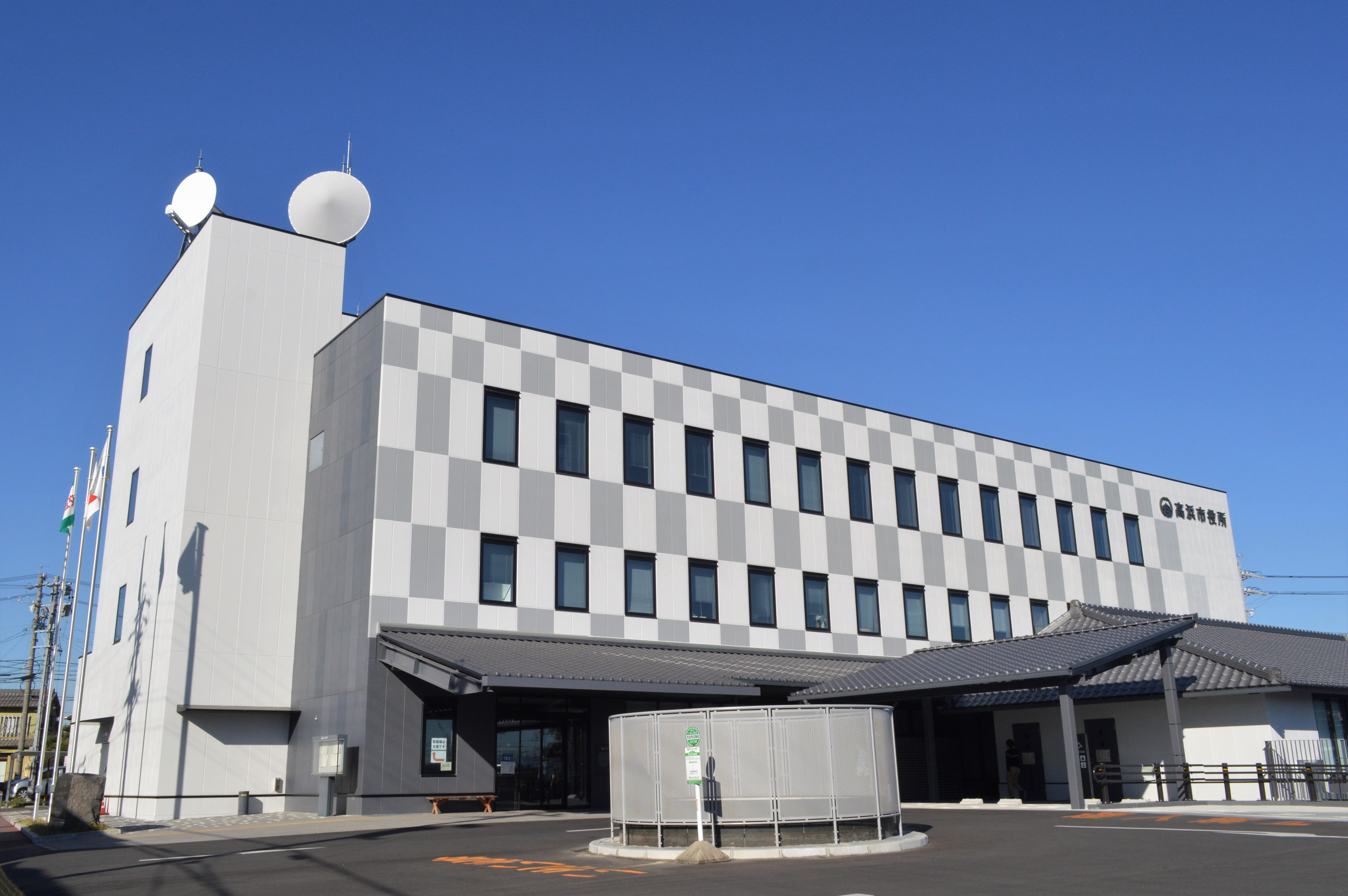
Takahama City Hall

Takahama has a mayor-council form of government with a directly elected mayor and a unicameral city legislature of 16 members. The city contributes one member to the Aichi Prefectural Assembly. In terms of national politics, the city is part of Aichi District 13 of the lower house of the Diet of Japan.

== Sister cities ==
Sister city

- Mizunami, Gifu Prefecture, since 1989

Disaster alliance city

- Tajimi, Gifu Prefecture, since November 2, 2005

== Economy ==
=== Primary sector of the economy ===
==== Animal husbandry ====
- Chicken Farming - Torimeshi

==== Forestry ====
- Wood Processing

=== Secondary sector of the economy ===
==== Manufacturing ====
- Automobile Manufacturing
- Ceramic Industry

== Education ==
=== Schools ===
Takahama has five public elementary schools and two public junior high schools operated by the city government, and two public high school operated by the Aichi Prefectural Board of Education. There is also one private high school.

== Transportation ==
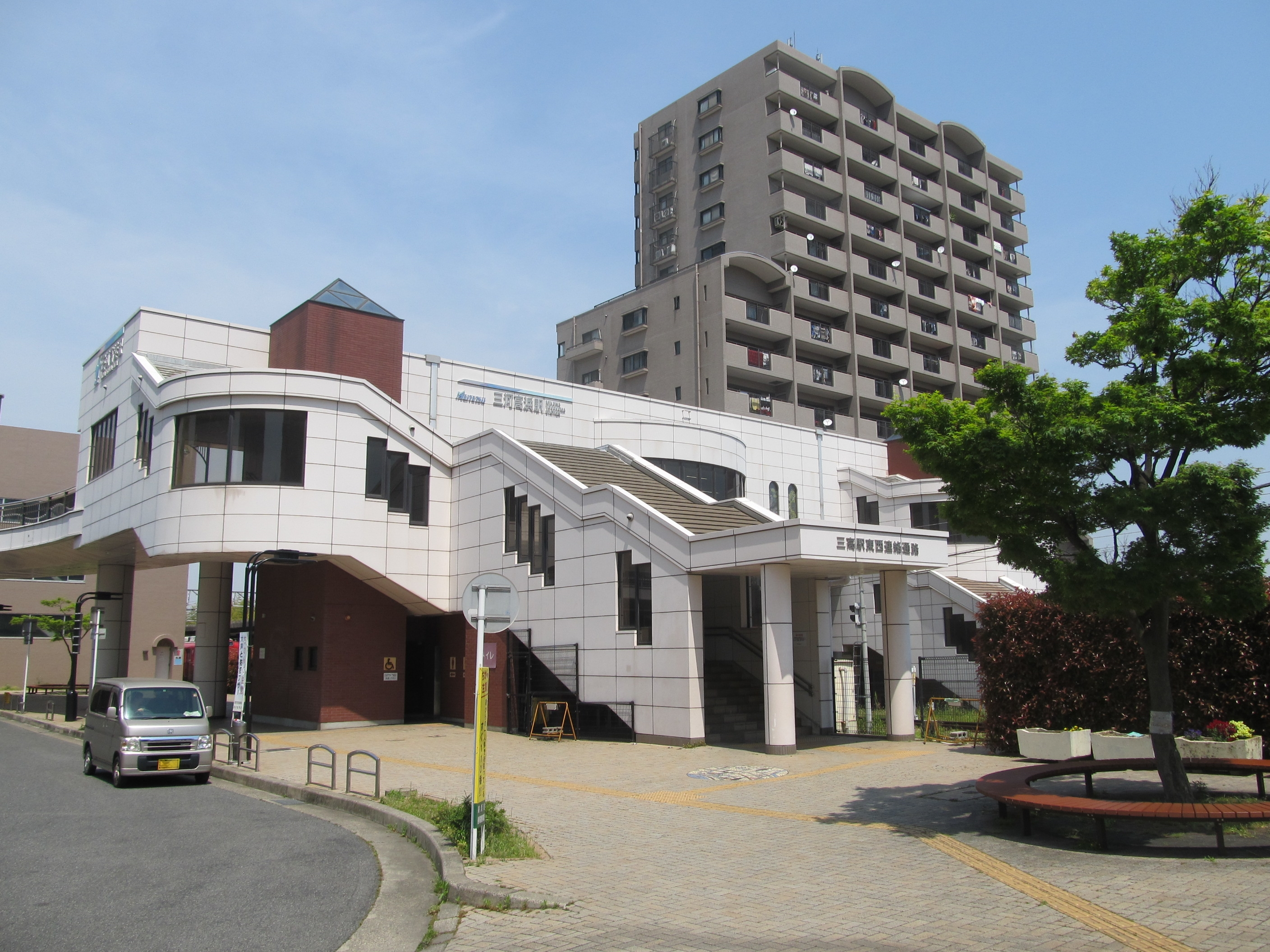
Mikawa Takahama Station

=== Railways ===
==== Conventional lines ====
Meitetsu

- Meitetsu Mikawa Line: - Yoshihama - Mikawa Takahama - Takahama Minato -

=== Roads ===
==== Japan National Route ====
- National Route 247
- National Route 419

== Notable people ==
- Yuzuru Azusa – singer
- Taka Hamako – cartoonist, wife of Yoshiyuki Sadamoto
- Yamashita Katsurafumi – vocalist for the pop band Takeuchi
- Shigeharu Naito – trainer for Japan Racing Association
- Masaaki Ohata – jockey
- Ryo Sakakibara – baseball player
- Takeuchi Satifo – lead for pop band Takeuchi Denki, guitar
- Ōoka Tatsu – painter
- Ikuei Yamamoto – wrestler
