= Mikawa Takahama Station =

Railway station in Takahama, Aichi Prefecture, Japan

Mikawa Takahama Station 三河高浜駅

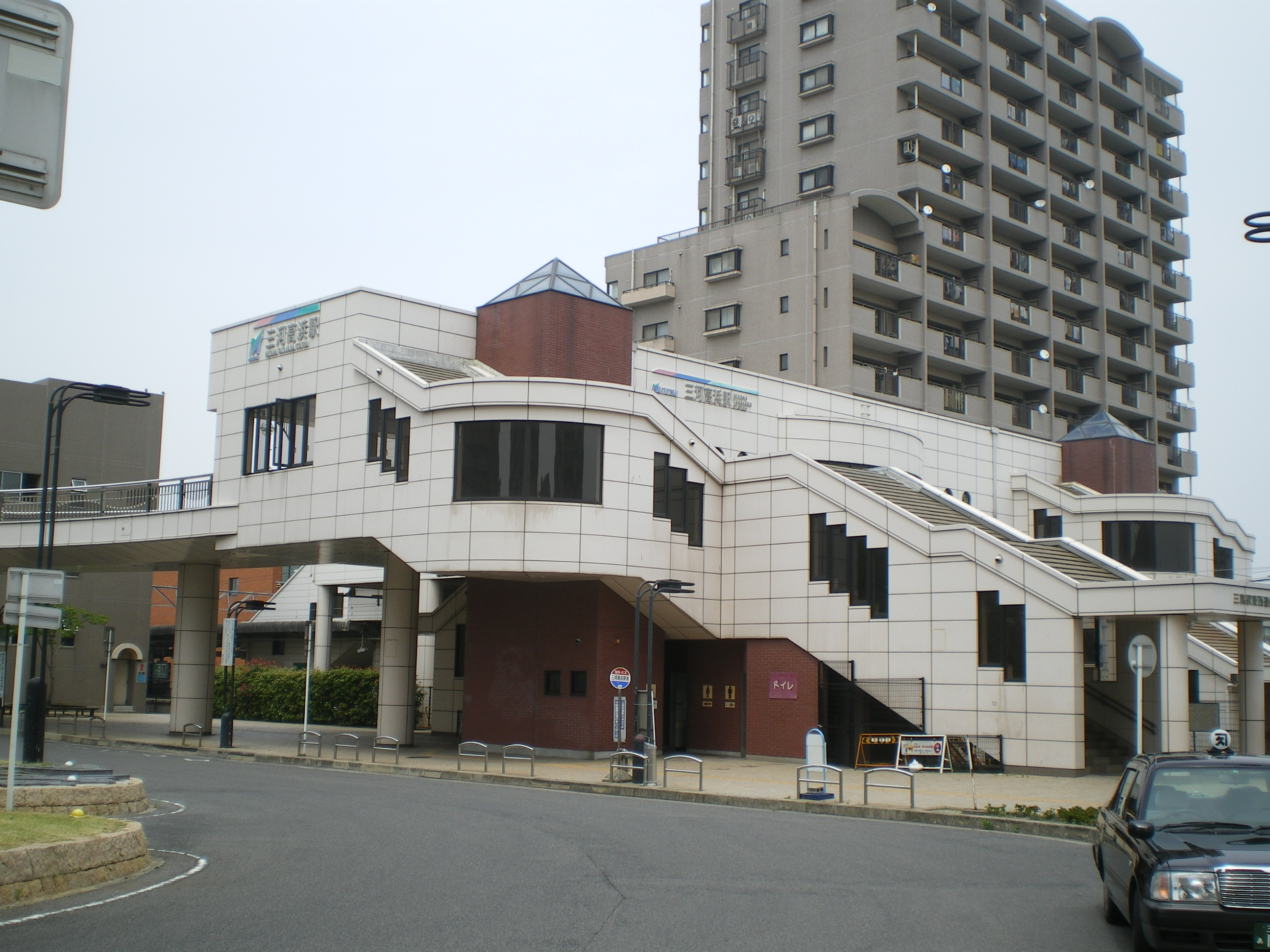
- Mikawa Takahama Station (West Gate), April 2018

General information
- Location: 5-3-1 Kasugachō, Takahama-shi, Aichi-ken 444-1334; Japan
- Coordinates: 34.9307°N 136.9901°E
- Operator: Meitetsu
- Line: ■ Meitetsu Toyota Line
- Distance: 33.3 kilometers from Sanage
- Platforms: 1 island platform

Other information
- Status: Unstaffed
- Station code: MU06
- Website: Official website

History
- Opened: April 20, 1918

Passengers
- FY2017: 4332

Services
Preceding station	Meitetsu	Following station
Yoshihama towards Chiryū	Mikawa Line Chiryū–Hekinan	Takahama-minato towards Hekinan
Location
- Location within Aichi Prefecture Location within Japan

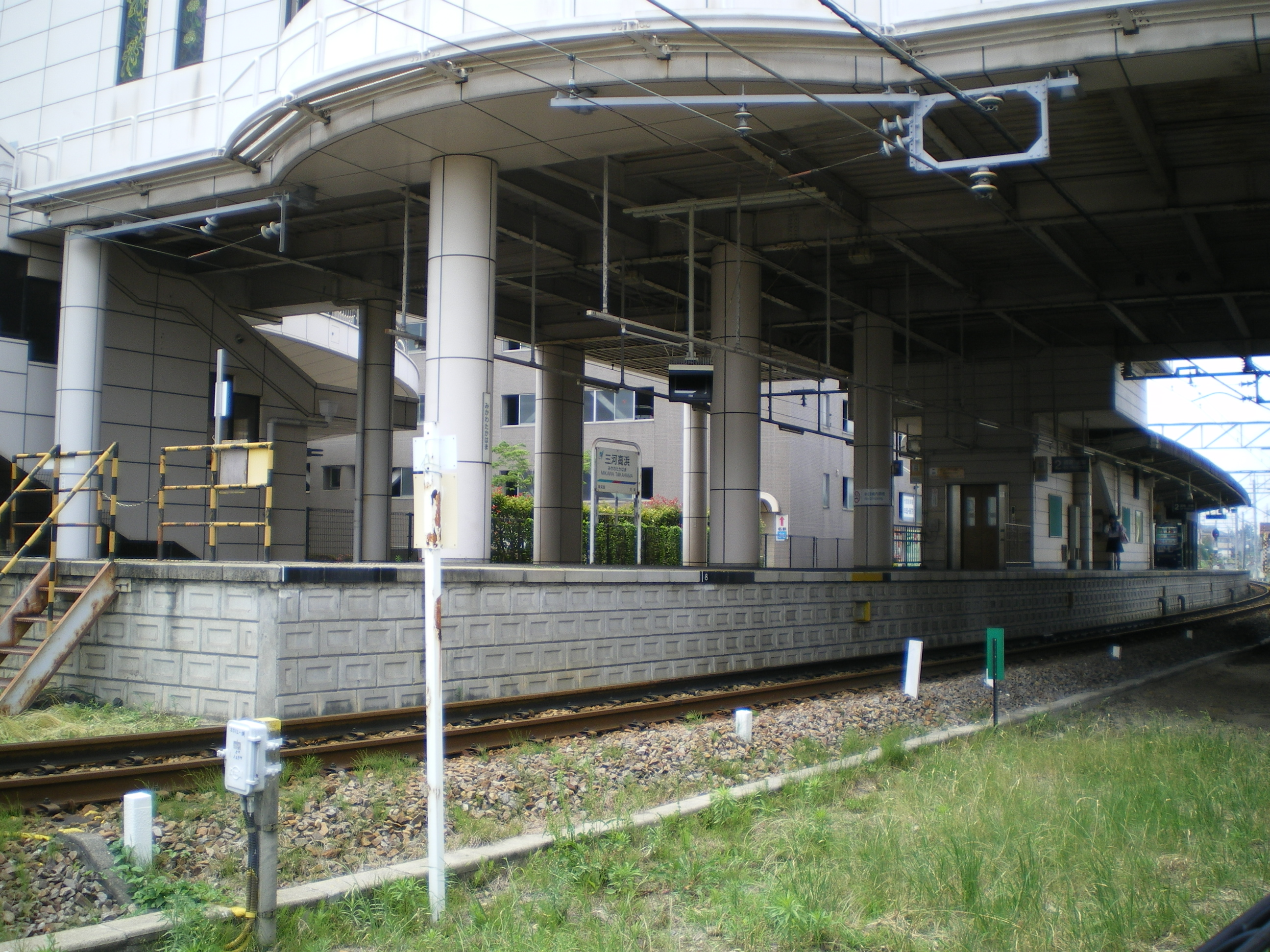

Mikawa Takahama Station (三河高浜駅, Mikawa Takahama-eki) is a train station in the city of Takahama, Aichi Prefecture, Japan, operated by Meitetsu.

== Lines ==
Mikawa Takahama Station is served by the Meitetsu Mikawa Line, and is located 12 km (7.5 mi) from the starting point of the line at Chiryū and 33.3 km (20.7 mi) from Sanage.

== Station layout ==
The station has a single island platform with an elevated station building above the platform. The station has automated ticket machines, Manaca automated turnstiles and is unattended.

=== Platforms ===
1	■ Mikawa Line	For Chiryū
2	■ Mikawa Line	For Hekinan

== Station history ==
Mikawa Takahama Station was opened on April 20, 1918, as a station on the privately owned Mikawa Railway Company. The Mikawa Railway Company was taken over by Meitetsu on June 1, 1941. The station building was rebuilt in 1994 as an elevated station, built on an overpass above the platforms and tracks.

== Passenger statistics ==
In fiscal 2017, the station was used by an average of 4,332 passengers daily.

== Surrounding area ==
- Takahama City Hall
- Takahama High School

== See also ==
- List of railway stations in Japan
