= Hekinan Station =

Railway station in Hekinan, Aichi Prefecture, Japan

Hekinan Station 碧南駅

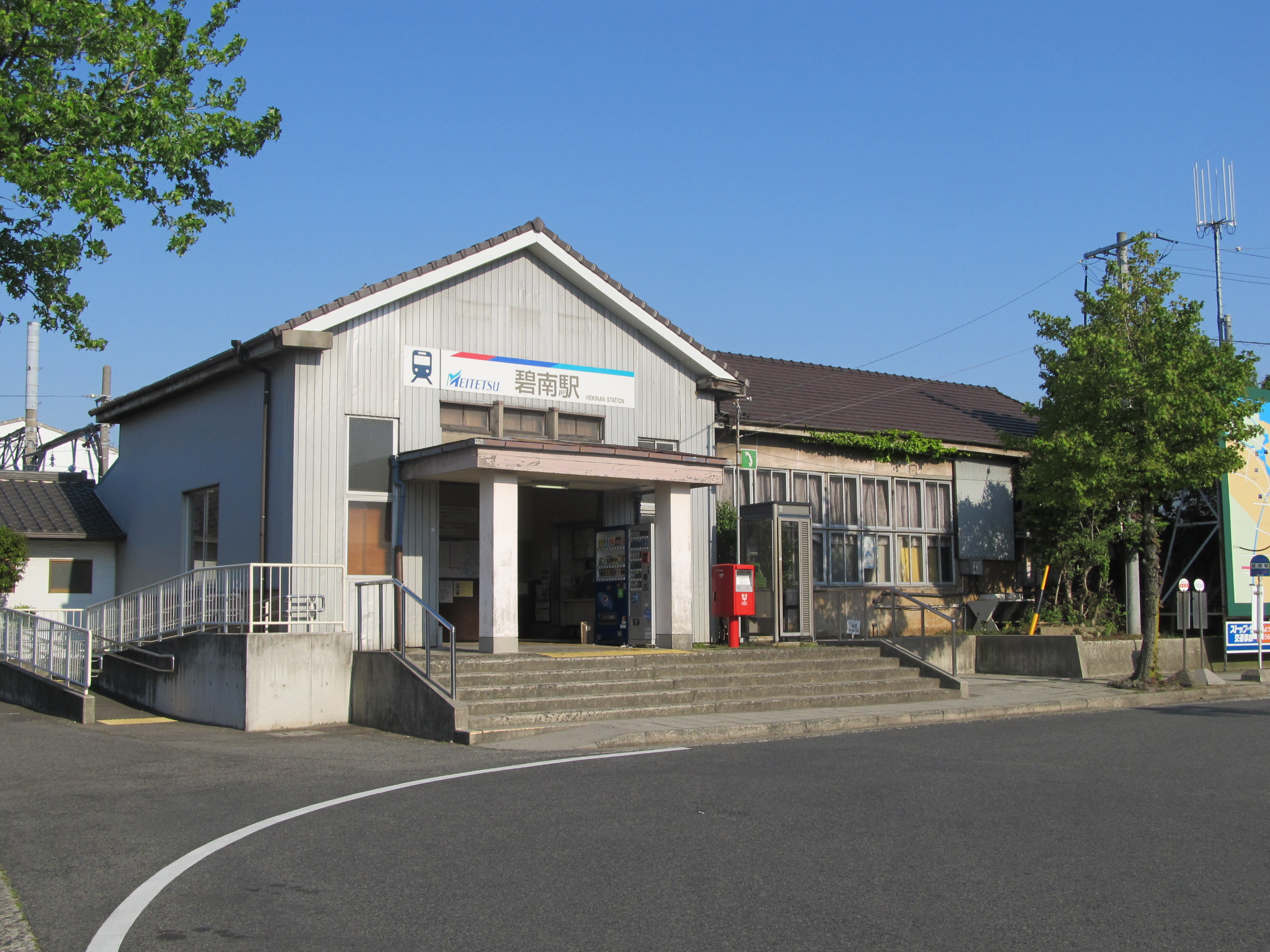
- Hekinan Station in March 2014

General information
- Location: Nakamachi 5-48, Hekinan-shi, Aichi-ken 447-0846; Japan
- Coordinates: 34.8743°N 136.9861°E
- Operator: Meitetsu
- Line: ■ Meitetsu Mikawa Line
- Distance: 39.8 kilometers from Sanage
- Platforms: 1 island platform

Other information
- Status: Unstaffed
- Station code: MU11
- Website: Official website

History
- Opened: February 5, 1914

Passengers
- FY2017: 3956

Services
Preceding station	Meitetsu	Following station
Hekinan-chūō towards Chiryū	Mikawa Line Chiryū–Hekinan	Terminus
Location
- Location within Aichi Prefecture Location within Japan

Hekinan Station track diagram

Hekinan Station (碧南駅, Hekinan-eki) is a railway station in the city of Hekinan, Aichi Prefecture, Japan, operated by Meitetsu. The station provides access to the center of Hekinan, Aichi, and specific notable sites nearby include Hekinan Seaside Aquarium, Myōfuku Temple, and the headquarters of Kokonoe Mirin Company, which produces mirin.

== Lines ==
Hekinan Station is a terminal station of the Meitetsu Mikawa Line, and is located 39.8 km (24.7 mi) from the starting point of the line at Sanage and 16.8 km (10.4 mi) from Chiryū.

== Station layout ==
The station has a single island platform connected to the station building by a level crossing. The station has automatic turnstiles for the Tranpass system of magnetic fare cards, and is unattended.

=== Platforms ===
1	■ Mikawa Line	For Mikawa Takahama, Kariya, and Chiryū
2	■ Mikawa Line	For Mikawa Takahama, Kariya, and Chiryū

== Station history ==
Hekinan Station was opened on February 5, 1914; 112 years ago as Ōhama-minato Station (大浜港駅) as a terminal station of a line owned and operated by Mikawa Railroad. A spur line from this station to Ōhamaguchi Station (大浜口駅, Ōhamaguchi-eki) was in operation from 1915-1946. The station became part of the Mikawa Line of Nagoya Railroad in June 1941. The station was renamed to its present name on April 1, 1954. The extension from Hekinan Station to Kira-Yoshida was discontinued on April 1, 2004. The station has been unattended since 2005.

== Passenger statistics ==
In fiscal 2017, the station was used by an average of 3956 passengers daily (boarding passengers only).

== Surrounding area ==
- Shinkawa Elementary School
- Shinkawa Junior High School
- Kobayashi Memorial Hospital

== See also ==
- List of railway stations in Japan
