= Chiryū Station =

Railway station in Aichi Prefecture, Japan

Chiryū Station 知立駅

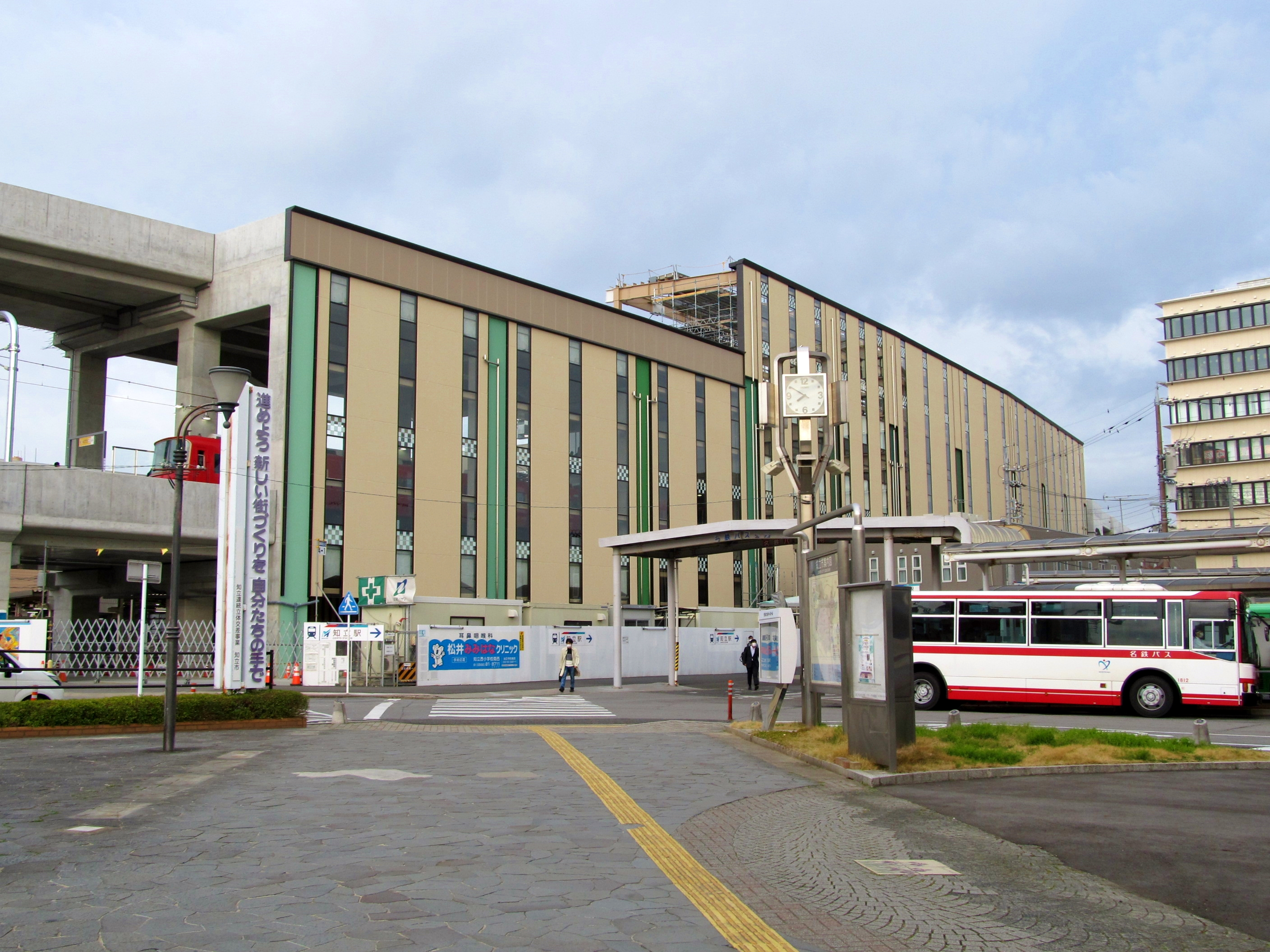
- Station Building

General information
- Location: Sakae 2-60, Chiryū-shi, Aichi-ken 472-0037; Japan
- Coordinates: 35.0059738°N 137.0403457°E
- Operator: Meitetsu
- Lines: ■ Meitetsu Nagoya Line; ■ Meitetsu Mikawa Line
- Distance: 41.3 kilometers from Toyohashi
- Platforms: 4 island platforms

Construction
- Structure type: Elevated
- Accessible: Yes

Other information
- Status: Staffed
- Station code: NH19
- Website: Official website

History
- Opened: 1 April 1959; 67 years ago

Passengers
- FY2017: 33,102 daily

Services
Preceding station	Meitetsu	Following station
Higashi Okazaki towards Toyohashi	Nagoya Main Line Rapid Limited Express	Jingū-mae towards Meitetsu Gifu
Shin Anjō towards Toyohashi	Nagoya Main Line Limited Express	Jingū-mae towards Meitetsu Gifu
Shin Anjō towards Toyohashi	Nagoya Main Line Express	Zengo towards Meitetsu Gifu
Shin Anjō towards Ina	Nagoya Main Line Semi-Express	Toyoake towards Meitetsu Gifu
Ushida towards Ina	Nagoya Main Line Local	Hitotsugi towards Meitetsu Gifu
Terminus	Mikawa Line Chiryū–Hekinan	Shigehara towards Hekinan
Mikawa Chiryū towards Sanage	Mikawa Line Sanage–Chiryū	Terminus
Location
- Location within Aichi Prefecture Location within Japan

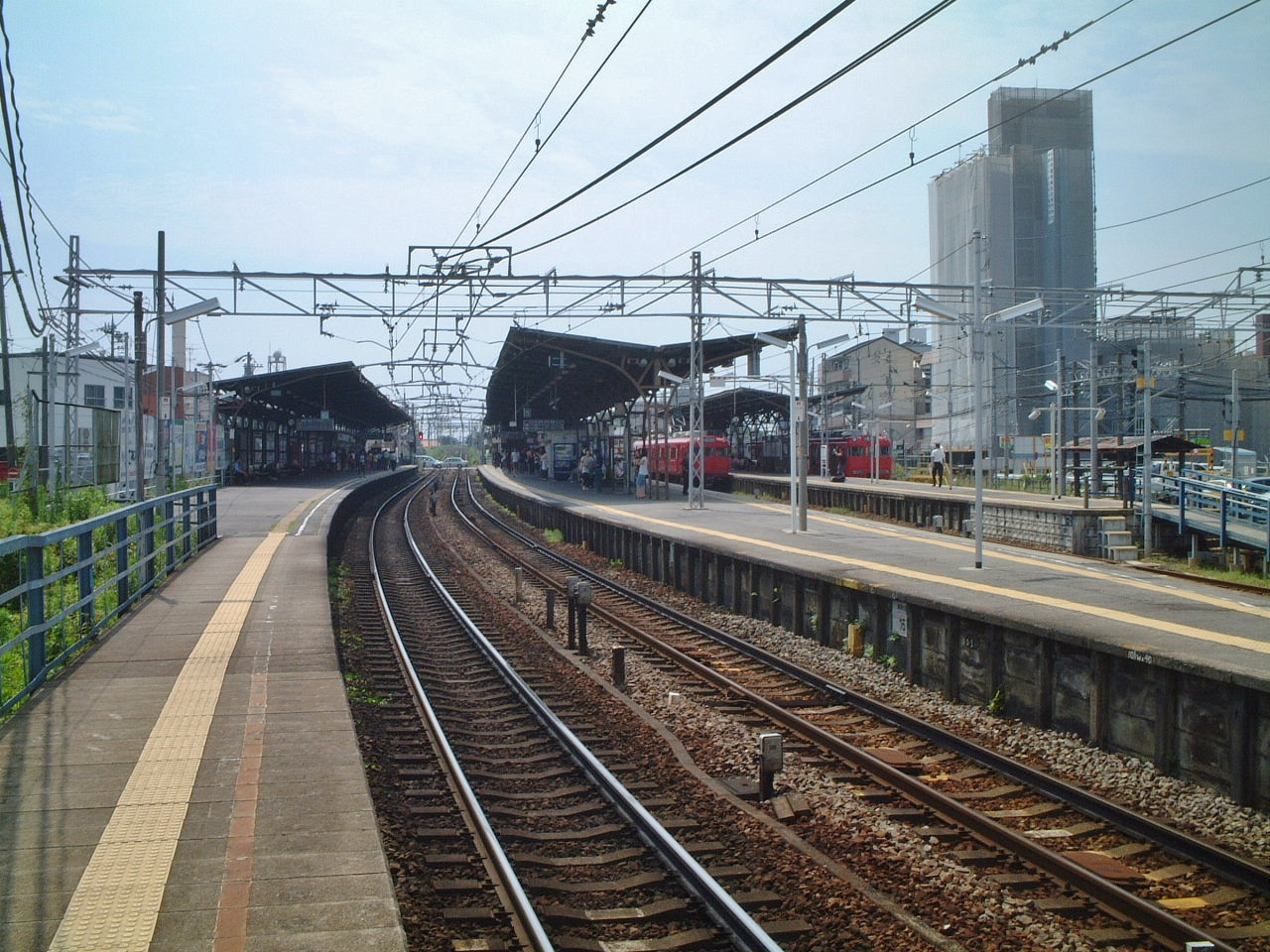
Platforms

Chiryū Station (知立駅, Chiryū-eki) is a railway station in the city of Chiryū, Aichi, Japan, operated by Meitetsu.

== Lines ==
Chiryū Station is served by both the Mikawa Line and the Nagoya Main Line. It is 41.3 kilometers from the terminus of the Nagoya Line at Toyohashi Station and is a terminus of the 39.8 km (24.7 mi) Mikawa Line.

== Station layout ==
The station has four island platforms and eight tracks, and consists of three floors connected by footbridges. The station is staffed on the north side.

=== Platforms ===
2	■ Mikawa Line	For Toyotashi and Sanage
3	■ Mikawa Line	For Toyotashi and Sanage
3	■ Mikawa Line	For Kariya and Hekinan
4	■ Mikawa Line	For Kariya and Hekinan
5	■ Nagoya Main Line	For Kanayama and Meitetsu Nagoya
8	■ Nagoya Main Line	For Higashi Okazaki, Toyohashi, and Nishio

Platform 8 is located on Floor 2 while others are all on Floor 1.

Track layout (2009, no longer current)

== History ==
The predecessor to Chiryū Station was opened on 1 April 1923, as Shin Chiryū Station (新知立駅, Shin-Chiryū-eki) on the privately owned Aichi Electric Railway Company, but soon merged with nearby Chiryū Station (知立駅, Chiryū-eki) on the Mikawa Railway later that year. The Aichi Electric Railway Company was taken over by Meitetsu on 1 August 1935, becoming the Meitetsu Nagoya Main Line, and the Mikawa Railway on 1 June 1941. Shin Chryū Station merged with the Chiryū Station (Main Line Side).

A new station was completed on 1 April 1959, and named Chiryū Station, with the former Chiryū Station becoming Higashi Chiryū Station (東知立駅, Higashi-Chiryū-eki) (Main Line Side) and Mikawa Chiryū Station (三河知立駅, Mikawa-Chiryū-eki) (Mikawa Line Side).

Overview of track alignments surrounding Chiryū Station

=== Future plans ===
Construction of a new elevated station has been in progress since 2015. Originally scheduled for a 2023 completion, the completion date has been pushed back to 2031 while the price of the project has increased to approximately ¥100 billion (2021) (equivalent to ¥108 billion or US$715 million in 2024) from its original cost of ¥61 billion (US$556 million). The tracks for each of the lines will gradually be moved to the new station structure further north on the Nagoya Main Line by approximately 20 metres (66 ft). When completed, the station will compose of three levels with the platforms on the Nagoya Main Line on the 2nd level and the platforms for the Mikawa Line on the top level.

The first tracks that were moved to the new facilities were the southbound tracks on the Nagoya Main Line (previously serving platform 6), which were reassigned to platform 8 on the new elevated level on 21 March 2023. The northbound Nagoya Main Line tracks are to follow in 2026, the Mikawa Line tracks in 2027, all railway tracks are scheduled to be removed from the ground in 2030. The entire construction project is to be completed in 2031.

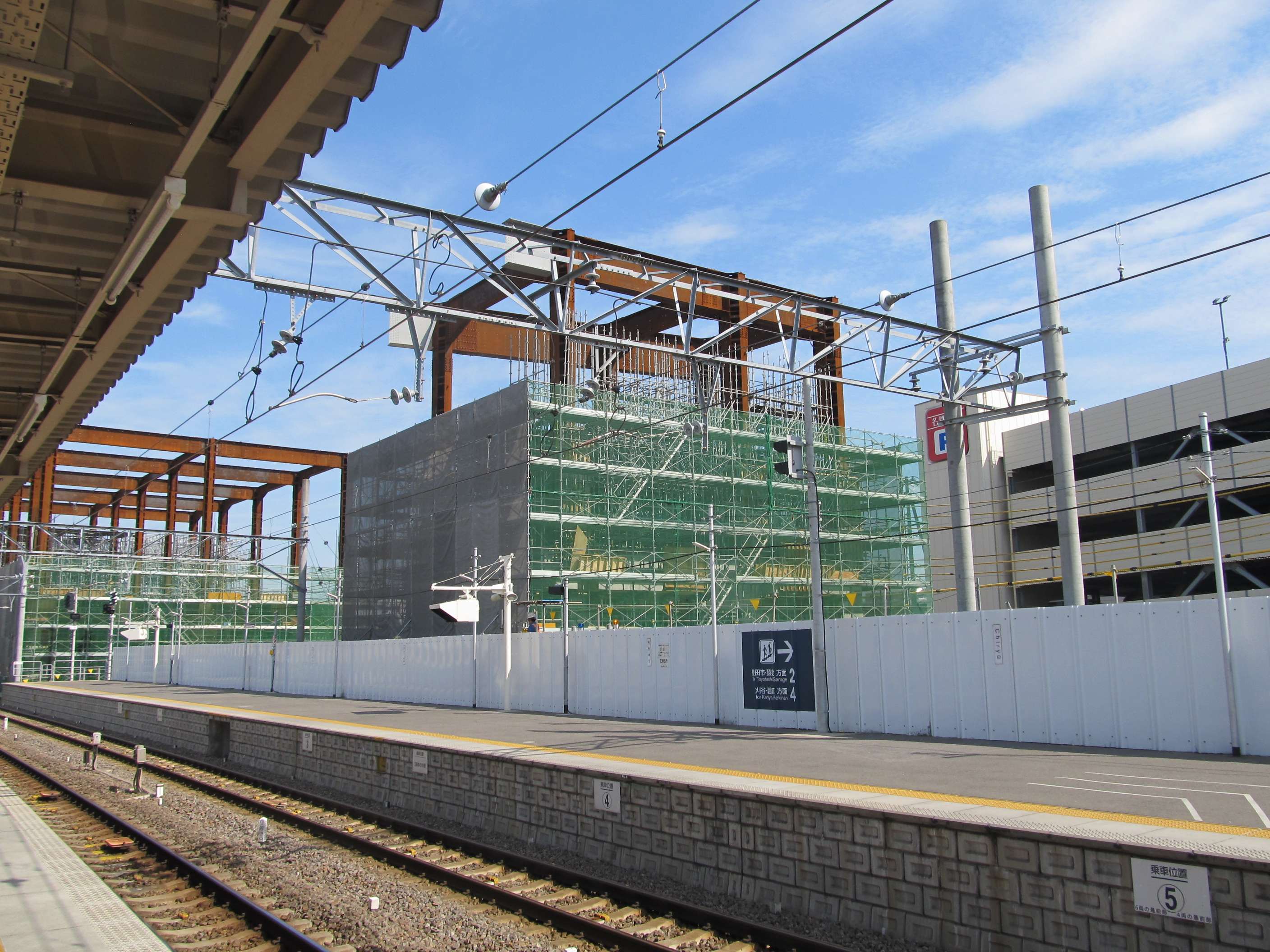
Construction work as of 2020

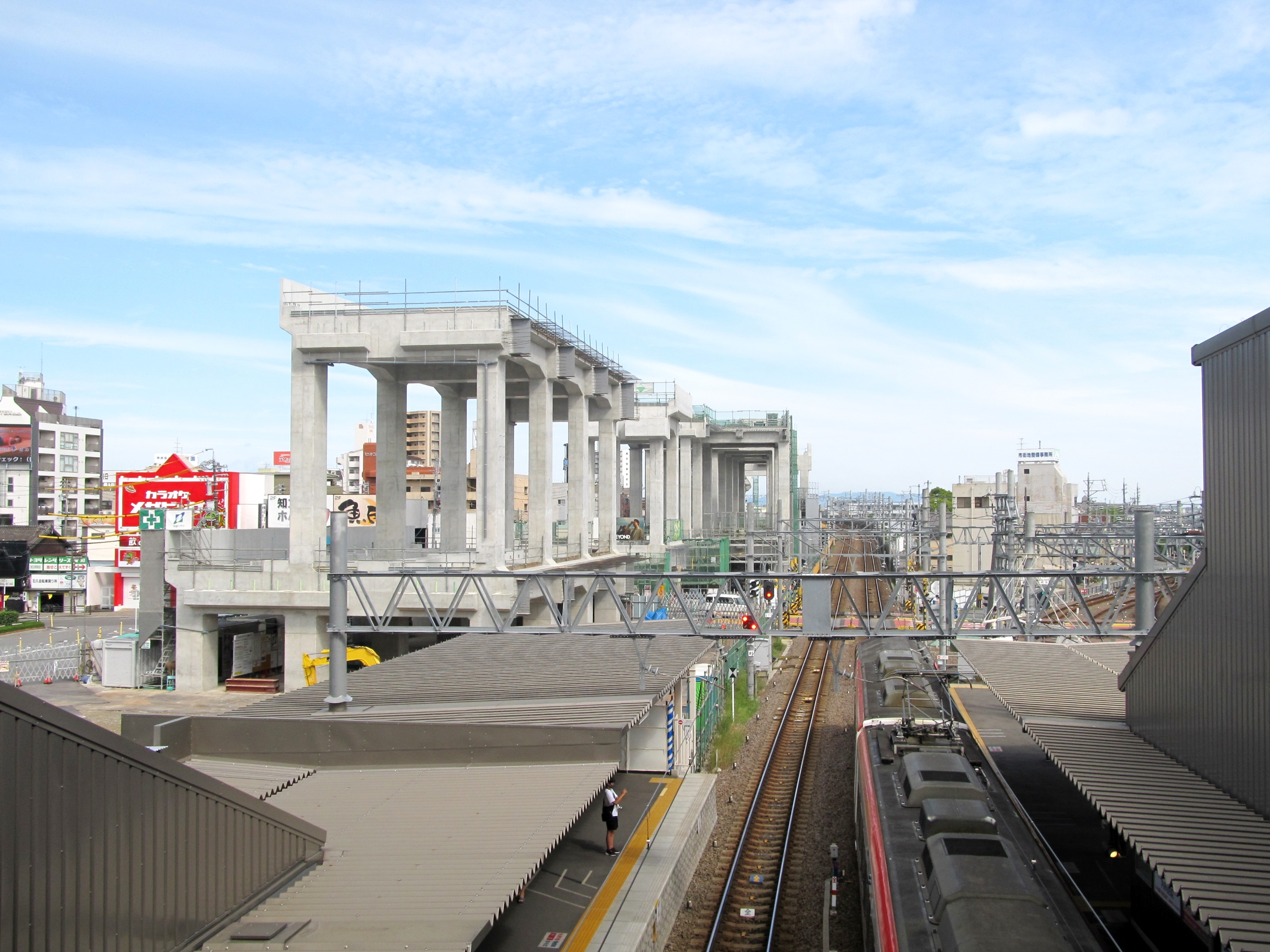
Overview of the construction site in 2021

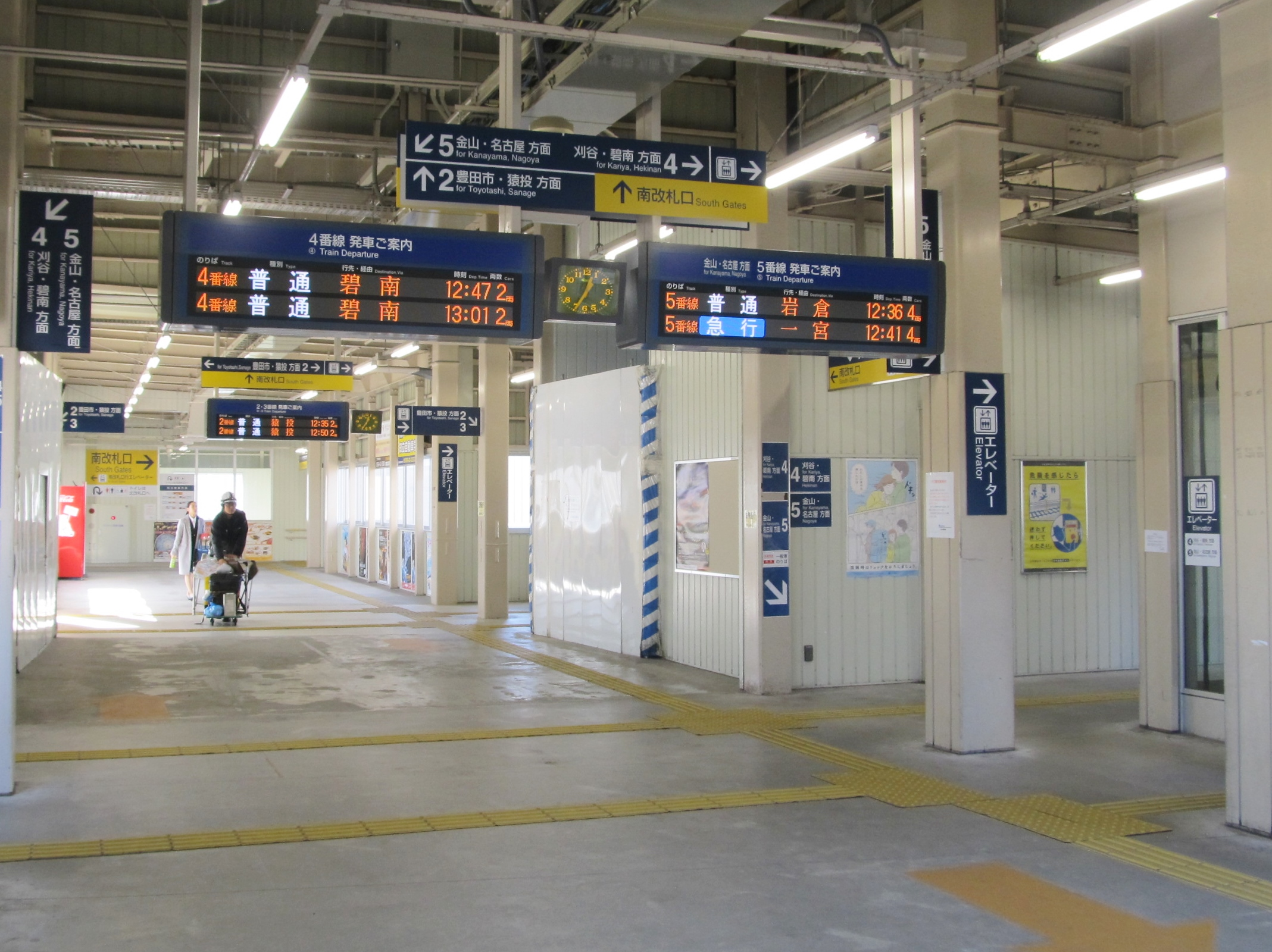
Temporary facilities seen in 2018

== Passenger statistics ==
In fiscal 2017, the station was used by an average of 33,102 passengers daily (boarding passengers only).

== Surrounding area ==
- Chiryū Elementary School
- Chiryū Jinja
- Japan National Route 1

== See also ==
- List of railway stations in Japan
