= Sanage Station =

Railway station in Toyota, Aichi Prefecture, Japan

Sanage Station 猿投駅

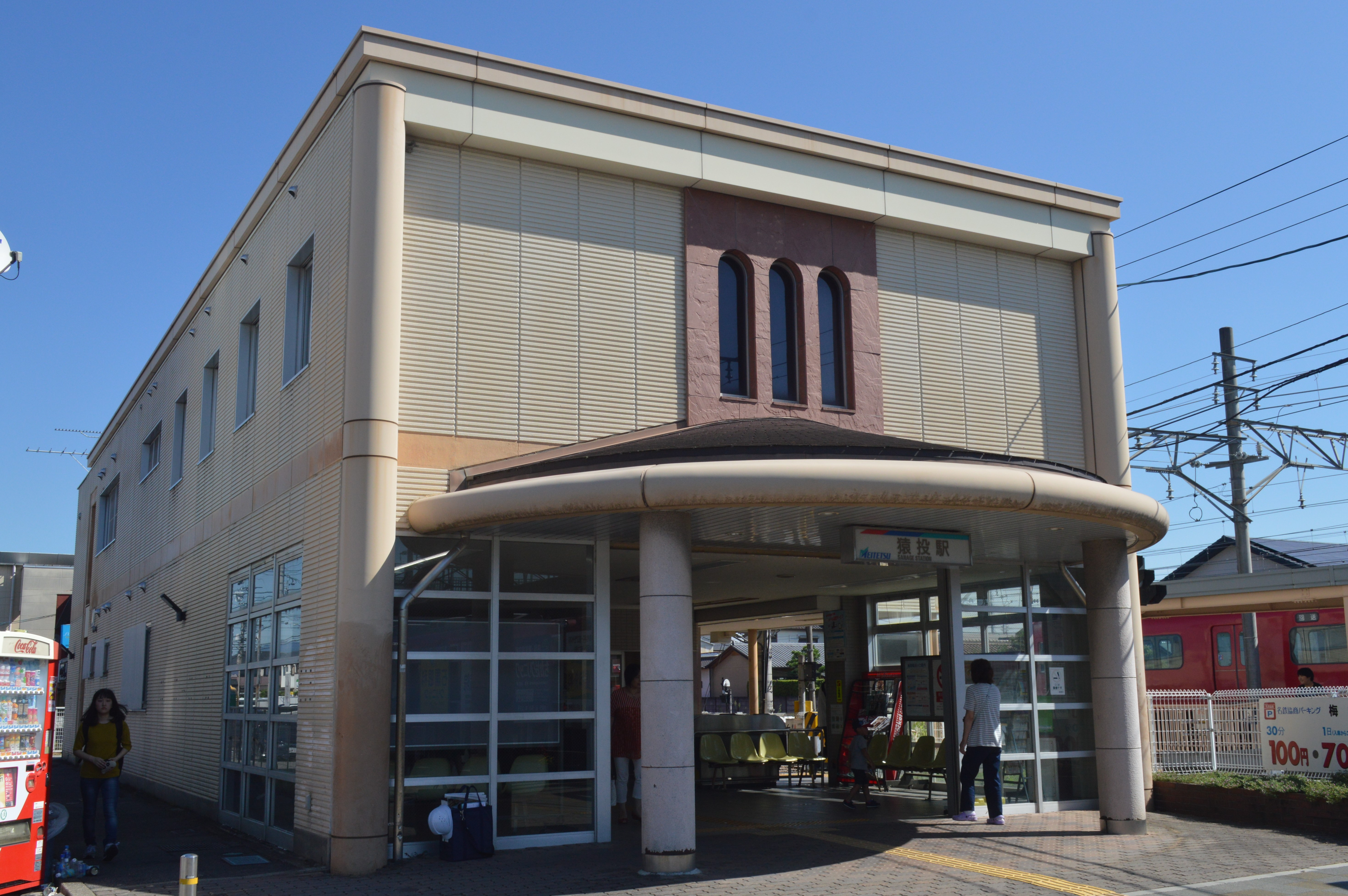
- Sanage Station in September 2019

General information
- Location: Inoue-cho 5-61, Toyota-shi, Aichi-ken 470-0372; Japan
- Coordinates: 35.1215°N 137.1786°E
- Operator: Meitetsu
- Line: ■ Meitetsu Mikawa Line
- Distance: 21.3 kilometers from Chiryū
- Platforms: 1 island platform

Other information
- Status: Staffed
- Station code: MY11
- Website: Official website

History
- Opened: 31 October 1924; 101 years ago

Passengers
- FY2017: 3988 daily

Services
Preceding station	Meitetsu	Following station
Terminus	Mikawa Line Sanage–Chiryū	Hirato-bashi towards Chiryū
Location
- Location within Aichi Prefecture Location within Japan

Sanage Station track diagram

Sanage Station (猿投駅, Sanage-eki) is a railway station in the city of Toyota, Aichi, Japan, operated by Meitetsu.

== Lines ==
Sanage Station is a terminal station of the Meitetsu Mikawa Line and is 21.3 km (13.2 mi)from the opposing terminus of the line at Chiryū Station.

== Station layout ==
The station has a single island platform connected to the station building by a level crossing. The station has automated ticket machines, Manaca automated turnstiles and is staffed.

=== Platforms ===
1	■ Mikawa Line	For Chiryū
2	■ Mikawa Line	For Chiryū

== Station history ==
Sanage Station was opened on October 31, 1924, as a station on the privately owned Mikawa Railway. The line was extended from Sanage to Shidare Station in 1927, and to Nishi-Nakagane Station in 1928. This extension was discontinued on April 1, 2004. The current station building was completed in 1932. The Mikawa Railway was merged with Meitetsu on June 1, 1941.

== Passenger statistics ==
In fiscal 2017, the station was used by an average of 3988 passengers daily.

== Surrounding area ==
- Toyota Athletic Stadium
- Sanage Agricultural High School
- Sanagedai Junior High School

== See also ==
- List of railway stations in Japan
