= Aichi 13th district =

Legislative district of Japan

- Parliamentary constituency for the Japanese House of Representatives
- Numbered map of Aichi Prefecture single-member districts
- Prefecture: Aichi
- Proportional District: Tokai
- Electorate: 423,363

Current constituency
- Created: 1994
- Seats: One
- Party: LDP
- Representative: Taku Ishii
- Municipalities: Hekinan, Kariya, Anjō, Chiryū, and Takahama.

Aichi 13th district (愛知県第13区, Aichi-ken dai-ju-sanku or simply 愛知13区, Aichi ju-sanku) is a single-member constituency of the House of Representatives in the national Diet of Japan located in Aichi Prefecture.

== Areas covered ==
=== since 1994 ===
- Hekinan
- Kariya
- Anjō
- Chiryū
- Takahama

== List of representatives ==
Election	Representative	Party	Notes
1996	Satoshi Shima	New Frontier	
1996	Satoshi Shima	New Fraternity	
1996	Satoshi Shima	Democratic	
2000	Hideaki Ōmura	Liberal Democratic	
2003	Hideaki Ōmura	Liberal Democratic	
2005	Hideaki Ōmura	Liberal Democratic	
2009	Kensuke Ōnishi	Democratic	
2012	Sei Ōmi	Liberal Democratic	
2014	Kensuke Ōnishi	Democratic	
2014	Kensuke Ōnishi	Democratic	
2017	Kensuke Ōnishi	Kibō no Tō	
2017	Kensuke Ōnishi	DPP	
2021	Kensuke Ōnishi	CDP	
2024	Kensuke Ōnishi	CDP	
2026	Taku Ishii	LDP	

== Election results ==
=== 2026 ===
2026
Party	Candidate	Votes	%	±%
LDP	Taku Ishii	151,944	58.6	▲21.8
Centrist Reform	Kensuke Onishi	58.084	36.4	▼19.9
JCP	Kiyohiro Ushita	12,910	5.0	▼1.9
Registered electors		421,495		
Turnout			63.44	▲3.58
LDP gain from Centrist Reform				

=== 2024 ===
2024
Party	Candidate	Votes	%	±%
CDP	Kensuke Ōnishi (incumbent)	137,944	56.31	▲3.59
Liberal Democratic	Taku Ishii	90,214	36.83	▼10.45
Communist	Kiyohiro Ushita	16,818	6.87	New
Majority		47,730	19.48	▲14.014
Registered electors		422,024		
Turnout		244,976	59.86	▼1.70
CDP hold				

=== 2021 ===
2021
Party	Candidate	Votes	%	±%
CDP	Kensuke Ōnishi (incumbent)	134,033	52.72	New
Liberal Democratic (endorsed by Komeito)	Taku Ishii (won PR seat)	120,203	47.28	
Majority		13,830	5.44	
Registered electors		422,731		
Turnout			61.56	▲1.05
CDP hold				

=== 2017 ===
2017
Party	Candidate	Votes	%	±%
Kibō no Tō	Kensuke Ōnishi (incumbent)	116,471	47.42	New
Liberal Democratic (endorsed by Komeito)	Sei Ōmi (PR seat incumbent) (won PR seat)	109,581	44.61	
Communist	Ryoichi Shimojima	19,589	7.97	
Majority		6,890	2.81	
Registered electors		416,667		
Turnout			60.51	▼0.04
Kibō no Tō hold				

- Ōmi resigned as a lawmaker to run for the Anjō mayoral election (but he lost).

=== 2014 ===
2014
Party	Candidate	Votes	%	±%
Democratic	Kensuke Ōnishi (PR seat incumbent)	116,652	49.62	
Liberal Democratic (endorsed by Komeito)	Sei Ōmi (incumbent) (won PR seat)	101,144	43.03	
Communist	Isao Miyaji	17,285	7.35	
Majority		15,508	6.59	
Registered electors		399,518		
Turnout			60.55	▼3.59
Democratic gain from LDP				

=== 2012 ===
2012
Party	Candidate	Votes	%	±%
Liberal Democratic (endorsed by Komeito)	Sei Ōmi	98,670	40.31	
Democratic (endorsed by PNP)	Kensuke Ōnishi (incumbent) (won PR seat)	97,187	39.70	
Tomorrow (endorsed by Daichi)	Kōki Kobayashi	37,405	15.28	New
Communist	Isao Miyaji	11,514	4.70	
Majority		1,483	0.61	
Registered electors		394,757		
Turnout			64.14	▼11.55
LDP gain from Democratic				

=== 2009 ===
2009
Party	Candidate	Votes	%	±%
Democratic	Kensuke Ōnishi	154,779	53.79	
Liberal Democratic	Hideaki Ōmura (incumbent) (won PR seat)	128,995	44.83	
Happiness Realization	Takashi Murota	3,950	1.37	New
Majority		25,784	8.96	
Registered electors		386,936		
Turnout			75.69	▲3.76
Democratic gain from LDP				

- Ōmura resigned as a lawmaker to run for the 2011 Aichi gubernatorial election.

=== 2005 ===
2005
Party	Candidate	Votes	%	±%
Liberal Democratic	Hideaki Ōmura (incumbent)	139,022	53.08	
Democratic	Satoshi Shima (PR seat incumbent)	109,593	41.84	
Communist	Ken Nakamura	13,311	5.08	
Majority		29,429	11.24	
Registered electors		369,801		
Turnout			71.93	▲5.63
LDP hold				

=== 2003 ===
2003
Party	Candidate	Votes	%	±%
Liberal Democratic	Hideaki Ōmura (incumbent)	114,092	48.44	
Democratic	Satoshi Shima (PR seat incumbent) (won PR seat)	109,670	46.56	
Communist	Makoto Takabayashi	11,765	5.00	
Majority		4,422	1.88	
Registered electors		361,655		
Turnout			66.30	
LDP hold				

=== 2000 ===
2000
Party	Candidate	Votes	%	±%
Liberal Democratic	Hideaki Ōmura (PR seat incumbent)	104,731	45.90	
Democratic	Satoshi Shima (incumbent) (won PR seat)	104,392	45.75	New
Communist	Kanehiko Miyagawa	15,880	6.96	
Liberal League	Ken Shirai	3,164	1.39	New
Majority		339	0.15	
Turnout				
LDP gain from Democratic				

=== 1996 ===
1996
Party	Candidate	Votes	%	±%
New Frontier	Satoshi Shima	87,991	46.78	New
Liberal Democratic	Hideaki Ōmura (won PR seat)	80,629	42.86	New
Communist	Makoto Takabayashi	19,484	10.36	New
Majority		7,362	3.92	
Turnout				
New Frontier win (new seat)				
