= Taku Ishii =

Japanese politician

- 石井 拓
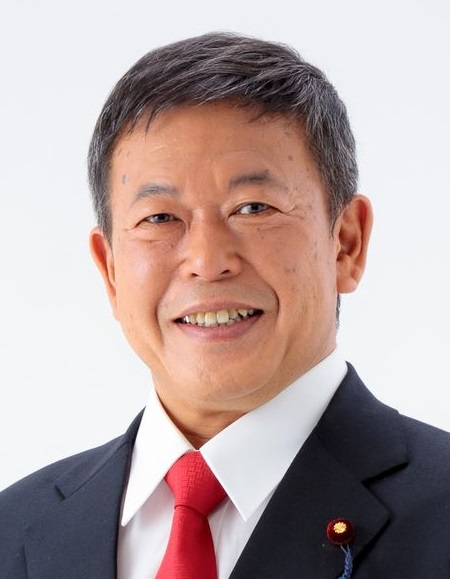
- Official portrait, 2021

Member of the House of Representatives
- Incumbent
- Assumed office 10 February 2026
- Preceded by: Kensuke Onishi
- Constituency: Aichi 13th
- In office 5 November 2021 – 9 October 2024
- Constituency: Tōkai PR

Member of the Aichi Prefectural Assembly
- In office 30 April 2015 – 12 July 2021
- Constituency: Hekinan City

Member of the Hekinan City Council
- In office 5 May 2008 – February 2015

Personal details
- Born: 11 April 1965 (age 61) Hekinan, Aichi, Japan
- Party: Liberal Democratic
- Education: Ritsumeikan University
- Website: 141taku.com

Taku Ishii (石井 拓, Ishii Taku; born 11 April 1965) is a Japanese politician of the Liberal Democratic Party who has served as a member of the House of Representatives for Aichi 13th district since 2026. He previously served in the House of Representatives from 2021 to 2024 through the Tōkai proportional representation block, and before entering national politics he served as a member of the Aichi Prefectural Assembly and the Hekinan City Council.

== Early life and education ==
Ishii was born in Hekinan, Aichi Prefecture, on 11 April 1965. He attended Washizuka Elementary School and Higashi Junior High School in Hekinan, then graduated from Nishio High School in 1984 and from the Faculty of Law of Ritsumeikan University in 1988.

After university, Ishii joined Meinan Management Center (now the tax-accounting firm Meinan Management) in 1988. In 1999 he founded Venture Ishii Consulting.

== Political career ==
Ishii entered elected office in 2008, when he was elected to the Hekinan City Council. He served two consecutive terms as a city councillor from April 2008 until February 2015.

In April 2015, he was elected to the Aichi Prefectural Assembly from the Hekinan City constituency. He won the 2015 election and was re-elected in 2019 with 13,312 votes. He also became chairman of the Liberal Democratic Party's Hekinan branch in 2015 and chairman of the party's Aichi 13th district branch in 2020.

At the 2021 Japanese general election, Ishii was first elected to the House of Representatives. He won his seat in 2021 through the Tōkai proportional representation block.

In September 2023, Ishii was appointed Parliamentary Vice-Minister of Economy, Trade and Industry and concurrently Parliamentary Vice-Minister in the Cabinet Office in charge of the international exposition. The Prime Minister's Office profile records that he continued in those posts under the second reshuffled Second Kishida Cabinet and the Ishiba Cabinet.

Ishii returned to the House of Representatives at the 2026 Japanese general election, when he won Aichi 13th district and secured his second term.

== Personal life ==
Ishii is from and lives in Hekinan. He is married and has a pet dog.

His hobbies are judo, in which he holds a fourth dan rank, and research into local history. His political motto is given as “Think Globally, Act Locally.”
