= Doi Toshikata =

Doi Toshikata may refer to:

- Doi Toshikata (Ōno) (1783–1818), daimyō of Ōno Domain
- Doi Toshikata (Kariya) (1788–1813), daimyō of Koga Domain
