= Kensuke Onishi =

Japanese politician (born 1971)

- 大西 健介
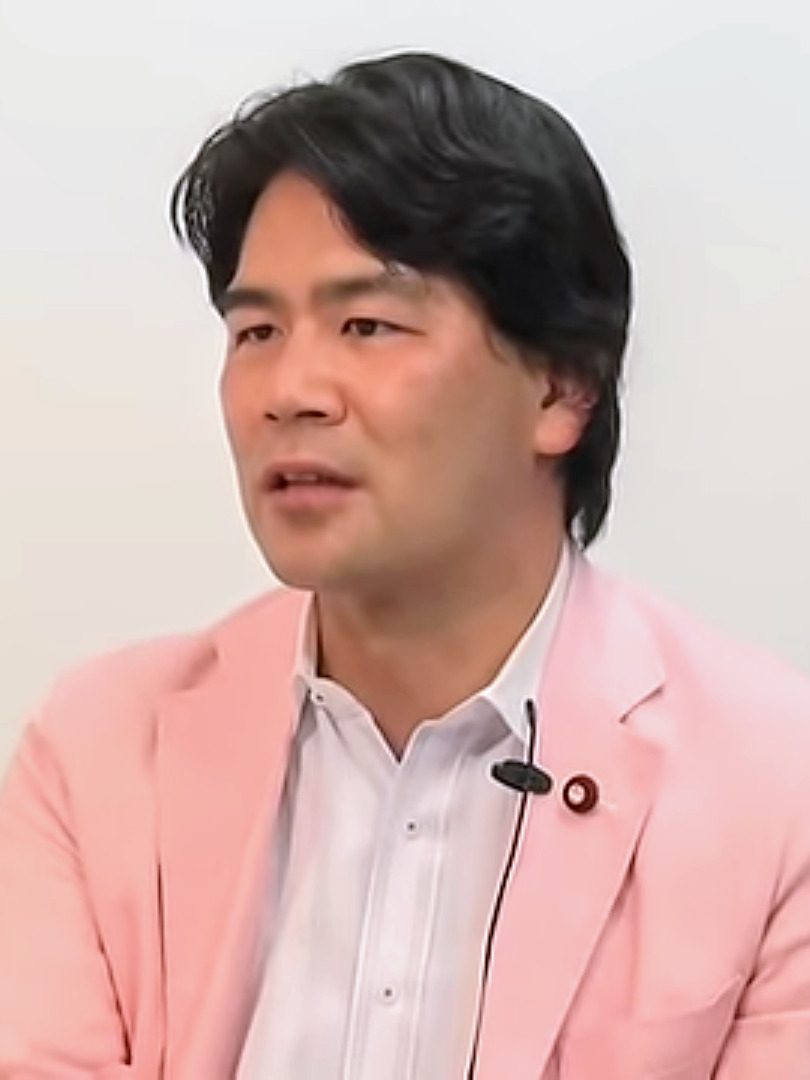
- Onishi in 2014

Member of the House of Representatives
- In office 30 August 2009 – 23 January 2026
- Preceded by: Hideaki Ōmura
- Succeeded by: Taku Ishii
- Constituency: Aichi 13th (2009–2012); Tōkai PR (2012–2014); Aichi 13th (2014–2026)

Personal details
- Born: 13 April 1971 (age 55) Osaka, Japan
- Party: CRA (since 2026)
- Other political affiliations: DPJ (2004–2016); DP (2016–2017); KnT (2017–2018); DPP (2018–2020); CDP (2020–2026)
- Education: Kyoto University

Kensuke Onishi (大西健介, Onishi Kensuke; born 13 April 1971) is a Japanese politician who served as a member of the House of Representatives from 2009 to 2026. From 2004 to 2009, he served as secretary to Sumio Mabuchi.
