= Doi Toshinori =

Doi Toshinori may refer to:

- Doi Toshinori (Ōno) (1777–1818), daimyō of Ōno Domain
- Doi Toshinori (Koga) (1831–1891), daimyō of Koga Domain
- Doi Toshinori (1768–1794), daimyō of Kariya Domain
- Doi Toshinori (1847–1872), daimyō of Kariya Domain
