= Chiryū =

Chiryū 知立市
- City
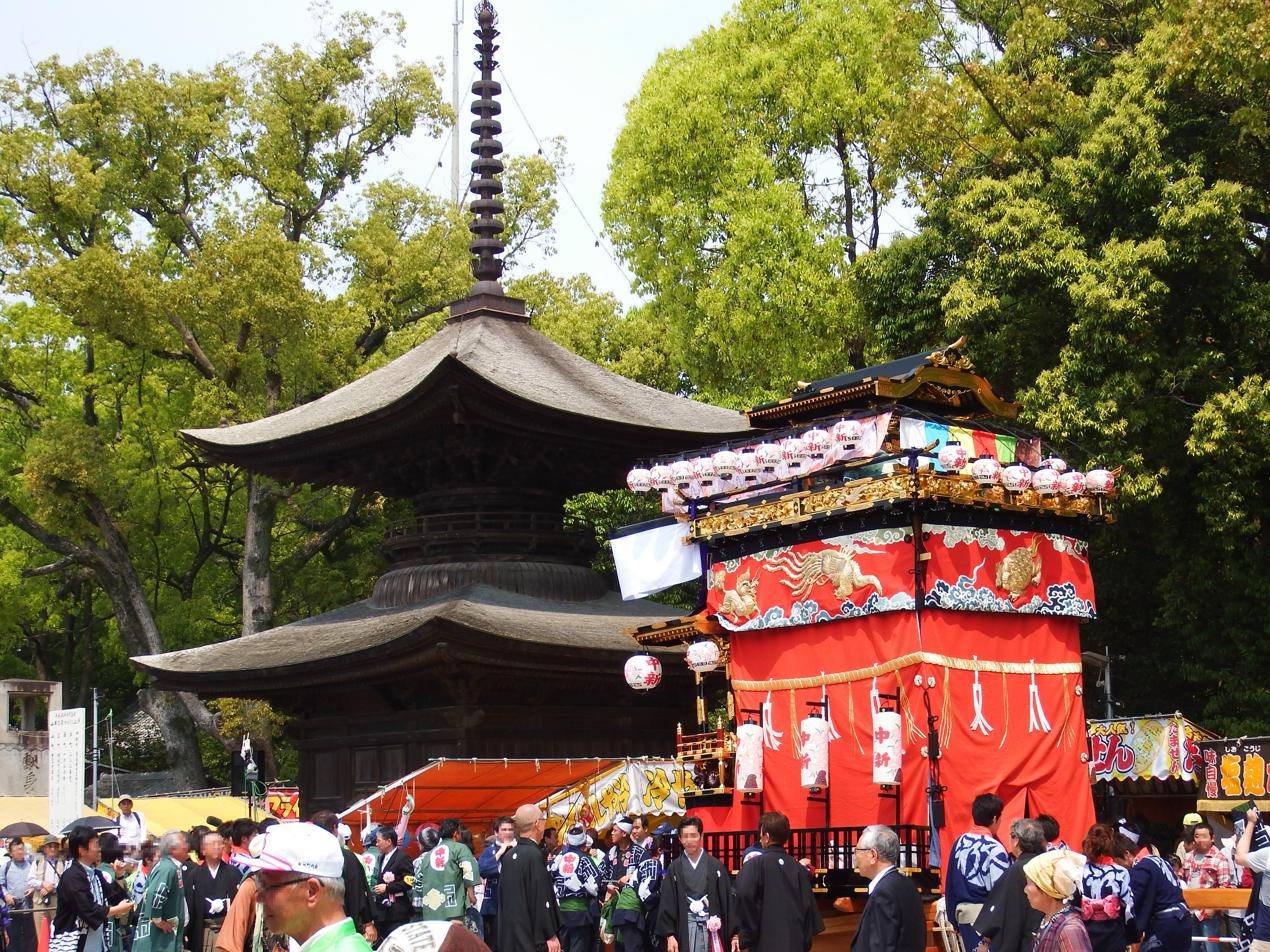
- Chiryū Festival

- Flag Seal

- Location of Chiryū in Aichi Prefecture

- Coordinates: 35°0′5.029″N 137°3′2.17″E
- Country: Japan
- Region: Chūbu (Tōkai)
- Prefecture: Aichi

Government
  - Mayor: Tomoko Ishikawa (since December 2024)

Area
  - Total: 16.31 km^{2} (6.30 sq mi)

Population (1 October 2019)
  - Total: 71,992
  - Density: 4,414/km^{2} (11,430/sq mi)
- Time zone: UTC+9 (Japan Standard Time)
  - Tree: Zelkova serrata
  - Flower: Iris laevigata
- Phone number: 0566-83-1111
- Address: 3-1 Hiromi, Chiryū-shi, Aichi-ken 472-8666
- Website: Official website

Chiryū (知立市, Chiryū-shi) is a city in central Aichi Prefecture, Japan. It belongs to the Nishimikawa region. As of 1 October 2019, the city had an estimated population of 71,992 in 32,579 households, and a population density of 4,414 persons per km². The total area of the city is 16.31 square kilometres (6.30 sq mi).

== Geography ==
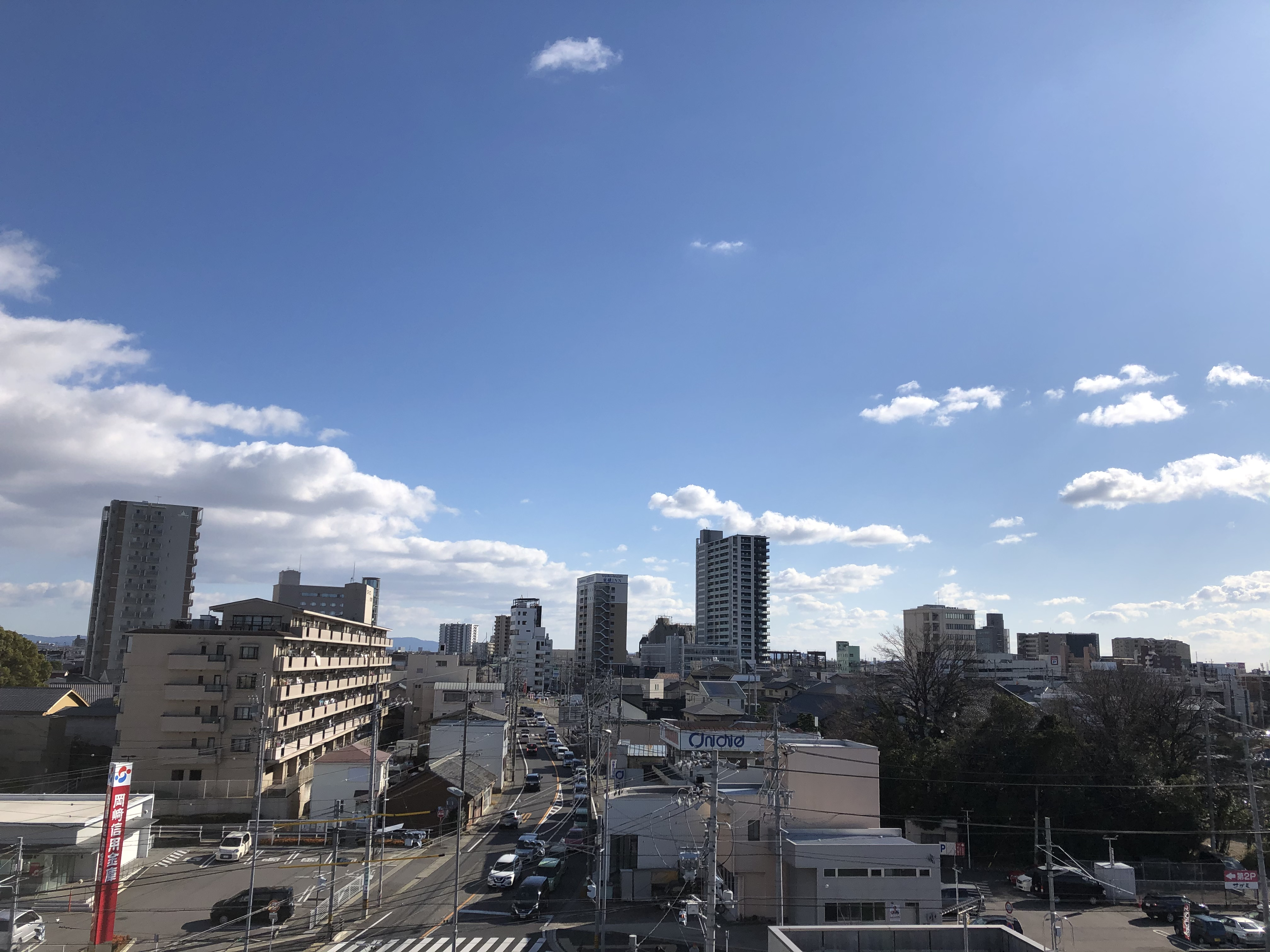
Chiryū skyline

Chiryū is situated in central Aichi Prefecture bordered by the Aizuma River to the north and the Sawatari River to the south.

=== Climate ===
The city has a climate characterized by hot and humid summers, and relatively mild winters (Köppen climate classification Cfa). The average annual temperature in Chiryū is 15.7 °C. The average annual rainfall is 1579 mm with September as the wettest month. The temperatures are highest on average in August, at around 27.9 °C, and lowest in January, at around 4.3 °C.

=== Demographics ===
Per Japanese census data, the population of Chiryū has been increasing steadily over the past 70 years.

Historical population
Year	Pop.	±%
1940	12,253	—
1950	17,220	+40.5%
1960	20,542	+19.3%
1970	41,895	+103.9%
1980	49,432	+18.0%
1990	54,059	+9.4%
2000	62,587	+15.8%
2010	68,392	+9.3%

=== Neighboring municipalities ===
Aichi Prefecture

- Anjō
- Kariya
- Toyota

== History ==
=== Ancient history ===
"Chiryū" as a local place name appears in documents in the Nara period, and was located within former Mikawa Province.

=== Early modern period ===
During the Edo period, the area prospered as Chiryū-juku, one of the post stations on the Tōkaidō connecting Edo with Kyoto. The town was noted for its horse trading fairs. Part of the present day city were under the control of Kariya Domain, a feudal han under the Tokugawa shogunate. The pottery industry was developed in these area from ancient times to the Middle Ages. About 100 old kiln sites have been discovered to date, as well as many ponds for agriculture that are said to have been built up to the early modern period.

=== Late modern period ===
After the Meiji restoration, Chiryū Town was created within Hekikai District, Aichi Prefecture on 1 October 1889 with the establishment of the modern municipalities system.

=== Contemporary history ===
Chiryū attained city status on 1 December 1970.

== Government ==
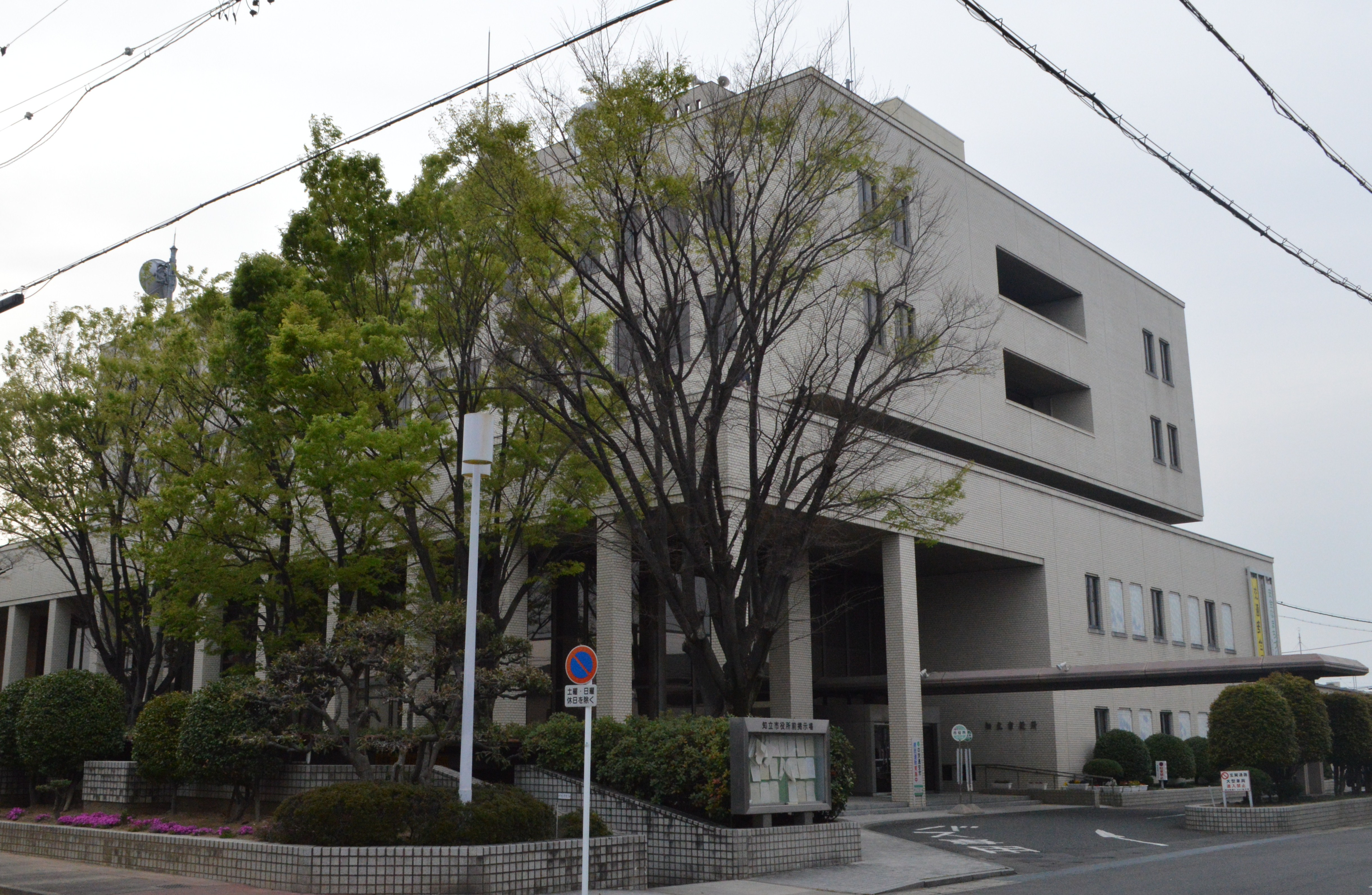
Chiryū City Hall

Chiryū has a mayor-council form of government with a directly elected mayor and a unicameral city legislature of 20 members. The city contributes one member to the Aichi Prefectural Assembly. In terms of national politics, the city is part of Aichi District 13 of the lower house of the Diet of Japan.

== Economy ==
The economy of Chiryū is industrial, with automotive parts and automotive electronics manufacturing predominating. Fuji Corporation, a machine tool manufacturer, has its head office and factory in Chiryū. The city has numerous road and rail connections to downtown Nagoya and is increasingly becoming a commuter town.

== Education ==
=== Schools ===
Chiryū has seven public elementary schools and three public middle schools operated by the city government, and two public high schools operated by the Aichi Prefectural Board of Education. There is also one private high school and three private vocational training schools.

== Transportation ==
=== Railways ===
==== Conventional lines ====
Meitetsu

- Nagoya Main Line: - Ushida – Chiryū –
- Mikawa Line: - Chiryū – Shigehara –

=== Roads ===
==== Japan National Route ====
- National Route 1
- National Route 23
- National Route 155
- National Route 419

== Local attractions ==
- Chiryū Jinja – Shinto shrine, with a tahōtō built in 1907, which has been designated as an Important Cultural Property
- Yatsuhashi Kakitsubata Garden (八橋かきつばた園) at the Muryoju-ji Temple which has been known for its water garden and Iris laevigata since the Heian period. It is also the place where the Ariwara no Narihira wrote a poem in the Ise Monogatari using the five initial letters of Ka-Ki-Tsu-Ba-Ta. The poem goes:

KArakoromo KItsutsu narenishi TSUma shi areba HArubaru kinuru TAbi wo shi zo omou (HA can also be read BA).

The Kikatsubata is the prefectural flower of Aichi prefecture as well as of Chiryū City. Each year at the end of April a festival is held in the temple garden as a celebration of the flowering.

== Sister cities ==
- Wyndham, Victoria, Australia, since 10 February 2000
- (Japan) Ina, Nagano Prefecture, Chūbu region, since 7 November 1994

== Notable people from Chiryū ==
- Ryoha Kitagawa – former idol
- Seiji Suzuki – politician

== See also ==
- Chiryuppi
