= Kinuura Rinkai Railway Hekinan Line =

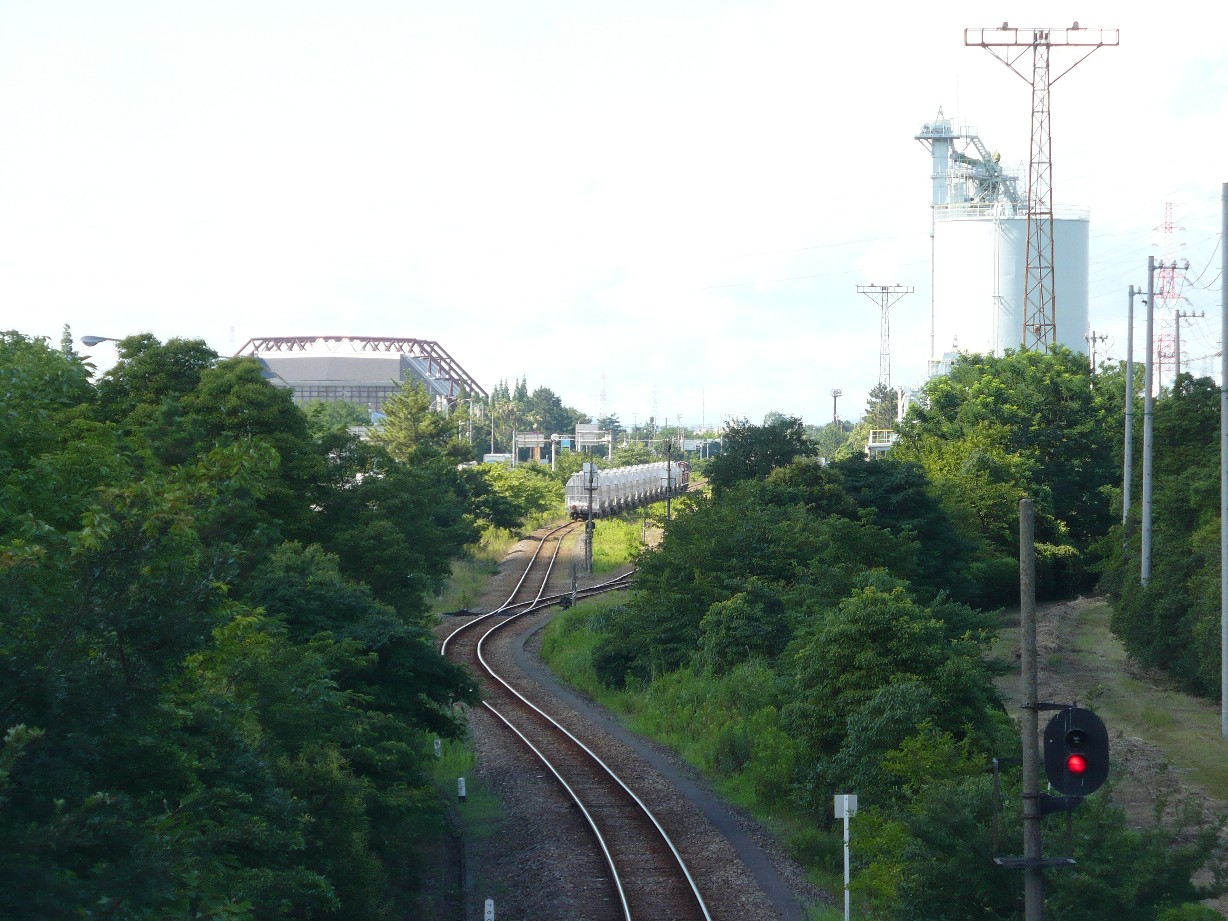
- Hekinanshi terminal, July 2012

Overview
- Native name: 衣浦臨海鉄道碧南線
- Status: Operational
- Owner: Kinuura Rinkai Railway
- Locale: Aichi Prefecture, Japan
- Termini: Higashiura; Hekinanshi

Service
- Type: Heavy rail

History
- Opened: May 25, 1977

Technical
- Line length: 8.2 km (5.1 miles)
- Track gauge: 1,067 mm (3 ft 6 in)
- Minimum radius: 200 m
- Electrification: Not electrified
- Operating speed: 45 km/h (30 mph)

The Kinuura Rinkai Railway Hekinan Line (衣浦臨海鉄道碧南線, Kinuura Rinkai Tetsudō Hekinan-sen) is a freight-only railway line owned and operated by the Kinuura Rinkai Railway in Aichi Prefecture, Japan, since 1977. The line extends 8.2 km (5.1 mi) from Higashiura Station (on the JR Central Taketoyo Line) Higashiura, Aichi to the terminal at Hekinanshi in Hekinan, Aichi.

== Operations ==
Freight services over the Kinuura Rinkai Railway tracks are hauled by Class KE65 diesel locomotives.

== History ==
The line opened on 25 May 1977, as an 11.3 km (7.0 mi) line from Higashiura to a terminal at Gongenzaki (権現崎駅). The 3.1 km section of the line from Hekinanshi to Gongenzaki was closed as of 1 April 2006, and the terminal at Takahamashi (高浜市駅) between Higashiura and Hekinanshi was also closed at the same time.

== See also ==
- Kinuura Rinkai Railway Handa Line, the other line operated by the Kinuura Rinkai Railway
- List of railway lines in Japan
