= Hekikai District =

Former district in Aichi prefecture, Japan

Hekikai (碧海郡, Hekikai-gun) was a district located in central Aichi Prefecture, Japan.

As a result of various consolidations and mergers of municipalities, the district was incorporated into the five cities of Kariya, Anjō, Takahama, Chiryū and Hekinan in 2005.

== History ==
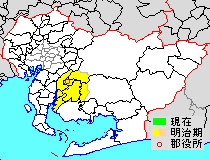
Map showing original extent of Hekikai District in Aichi Prefecture: * yellow - areas formerly within the district borders during the early Meiji period

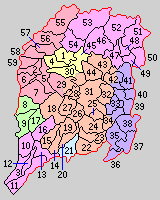
Colored areas are in this district.

Hekikai-gun is one of the ancient counties of western Mikawa Province and is mentioned in Nara period records, under the alternative pronunciation of the kanji in its name (Aomi), of which the only remain is Aomi-cho, a section of Takahama. In the Edo period, under the Tokugawa shogunate, most of the district was either part of Kariya Domain, a feudal domain, or tenryō territory administered directly by the shogunate, and was of the richest agricultural areas of Mikawa. After the Meiji Restoration, the area was merged into Aichi Prefecture.

=== District Timeline ===
- October 1, 1889 - In the cadastral reforms of the early Meiji period, Hekikai District was formed, and initially consisted of three towns (Chiryū, Kariya and Ohama) and 56 villages.
- October 20, 1890 - Parts of the village of Takatana [the section of Enomae] was split off to form the village of Enomae. (3 towns, 57 villages)
- April 1, 1891 - The establishment of the district/county system was implemented.
- September 8, 1891:
  - Parts of the village of Shikizaki (Shikisaki) [the section of Fushimiya] was split off to form the village of Fushimiya. (3 towns, 58 villages)
  - Parts of the village of Fujino [the sections of Higashimakiuchi, Kamisasaki, Shimosasaki and Kōno] was split off to form the village of Shigasuka. (3 towns, 59 villages)
- September 14, 1891 - Parts of the village of Sakai [the section of Higashisakai] was split off to form the village of Higashisakai. (3 towns, 60 villages)
- November 10, 1891 - The village of Akumi was split off into two new ones: the sections of Nehuanki (Nemunoki), Fukuoke and Takahashi would form the village of Nehuanki (Nemunoki); while the remaining sections of Kamiaono, Shimoaono and Ariie (Saiki) would form the village of Aono. (3 towns, 61 villages)
- November 28, 1891 - The village of Shimoshigehara was split off into two new ones: the sections of Hajōdo and Takasu would form the village of Hantaka; while the remaining section of Shimoshigehara would form the village of Shigehara. (3 towns, 62 villages)
- August 3, 1892 - The village of Kitaohama gained town status and was renamed as the town of Shinkawa. (4 towns, 61 villages)
- February 19, 1893 - The village of Yasaku (Yahagi) gained town status. (5 towns, 60 villages)
- June 22, 1896 - Parts of the village of Kasukai (Kasūmi) [the sections of Nakanogō and Doi] was split off to form the village of Nakai. (5 towns, 61 villages)
- July 9, 1900 - The village of Takahama gained town status. (6 towns, 60 villages)
- April 4, 1901 - Parts of the village of Hongō [the sections of Watari and Tsutsubari] was split off to form the village of Watari. (6 towns, 61 villages)
- May 1, 1906 - The following towns and villages were implemented with the following mergers: (7 towns and 9 villages)
  - the town of Takahama: the former town of Takahama, and the former villages of Yoshihama and Takatori
  - the town of Chiryū: the former town of Chiryū, and the former villages of Ushihashi, Kamishigehara and Nagasaki (partially) [the sections of Nishichū (Nishinaka), Tanida (Yata) and Yatsuda (Yatsuta)]
  - the town of Anjō: the former villages of Anjō, Nagasaki (partially) [the section of Sasame (Shinome)], Sato, Minowa, Fukama (Fukugawa), Akamatsu, Ima, Hiraki (Hirataka) and Furui
  - the village of Sakurai: the former villages of Sakurai, Fujino, Ogawa (Kogawa) and Mitsukawa (Mikkawa)
  - the village of Meiji: the former villages of Yonezu (Yonadozu), Nishihana (Seitan), Higashihana (Higashibata), Nezaki, Jōgairi, Izumi and Enomae (Enokimae)
  - the village of Yosami: the former villages of Takatana, Ogakie, Noda, Hantaka and Nagasaki (partially) [the section of Iguiyama]
  - the town of Kariya: the former town of Kariya, and the former villages of Shigehara, Oyama, Aizuma and Motokariya
  - the village of Fujimatsu: the former villages of Sakai, Higashisakai, Hitotsugi and Aimi (Aimami)
  - the village of Kamigō: Unebe (Unebu), Hisaeno, Masuzuka, Ueno and Wakai (Kazue)
  - the village of Takaoka: the former villages of Komaba, Wakazono, Tsutsumi and Take
  - the village of Mutsumi: the former villages of Urabe, Kasūmi, Nakai, Nakajima (Nakashima), Nehuanki (Nemunoki) and Aono
  - the town of Yasaku (Yahagi): the former town of Yasaku (Yahagi), and the former villages of Nakagō (Chūgō), Hongō, Nagase, Shiki and Shigasuka
  - the village of Asahi: the former villages of Shikizaki (Shikisaki), Fushimiya and Washizuka
- April 1, 1923 - The district council was abolished, while the district office remained.
- January 1, 1924 - The village of Tanao gained town status. (8 towns, 8 villages)
- July 1, 1926 - The district office was abolished, thus the area remained for geographic purposes.
- April 5, 1948 - The towns of Ohama, Shinkawa and Tanao were merged to form the city of Hekinan. (5 towns, 7 villages)
- April 1, 1950 - The town of Kariya gained city status. (4 towns, 7 villages)
- May 5, 1952 - The town of Anjō gained city status. (3 towns, 7 villages)
- May 1, 1955 - The following towns and villages were implemented with the following mergers: (2 towns and 4 villages)
  - The village of Fujimatsu and parts of the village of Yosami [the sections of Noda, Hanjōdo, Takasu, and Ogakie] were merged into the city of Kariya.
  - The remaining parts of the village of Yosami [the section of Iguiyama Nihongi Takatana] were merged into the city of Anjō.
  - The village of Meiji was split off and distant sections were merged into the cities of Hekinan [the section of Nishihana (Seitan)], Anjō [the sections of Higashihana (Higashibata), Nezaki, Enomae (Enokimae), Jōgairi and Ishii] and Nishio [the sections of Yonezu (Yonadozu) and Minaminakane].
  - The town of Yasaku (Yahagi) was merged into the city of Okazaki.
- May 1, 1956 - The village of Tajaoka gained town status. (3 towns, 3 villages)
- June 5, 1956 - The village of Sakurai gained town status. (4 towns, 2 villages)
- October 15, 1958 - The village of Mutsumi gained town status. (5 towns, 1 village)
- April 1, 1961 - The village of Kamigō gained town status. (6 towns)
- October 15, 1962 - The town of Mutsumi was merged into the city of Okazaki. (5 towns)
- March 1, 1964 - The town of Kamigō was merged into the city of Toyota. (4 towns)
- September 1, 1965 - The town of Takaoka was merged into the city of Toyota. (3 towns)
- April 1, 1967 - The town of Sakurai was merged into the city of Anjō. (2 towns)
- December 1, 1970 - The towns of Chiryū and Takahama were both elevated to city status. Therefore, Hekikai District was dissolved as a result of this merger.

== See also ==
- List of dissolved districts of Japan
