= Hekinan-chūō Station =

Railway station in Hekinan, Aichi Prefecture, Japan

Hekinan-chūō Station 碧南中央駅

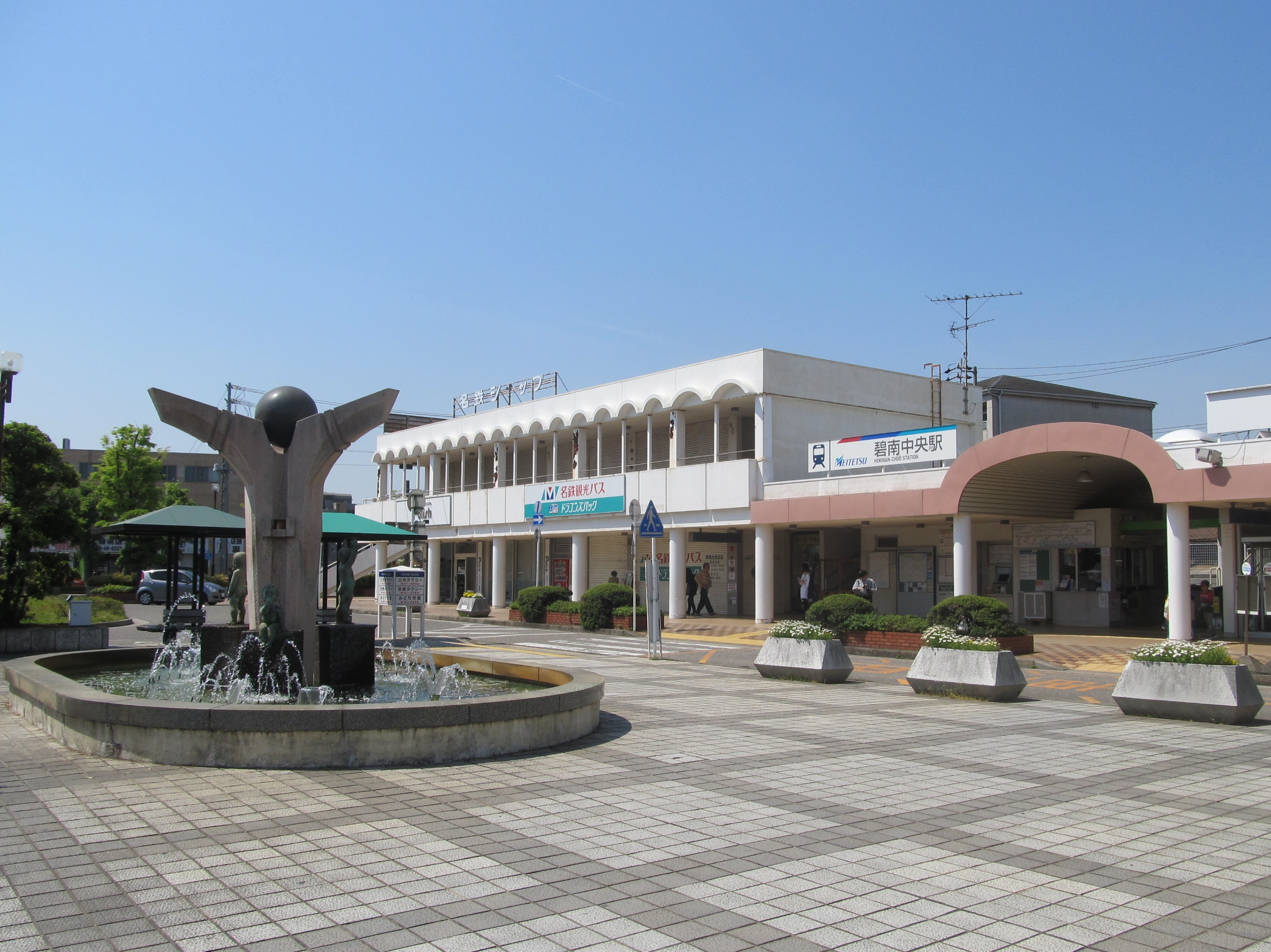
- Hekinan-chūō Station in April 2018

General information
- Location: Sakaemachi 3-58, Hekinan-shi, Aichi-ken 447-0877; Japan
- Coordinates: 34.8876°N 136.9893°E
- Operator: Meitetsu
- Line: ■ Meitetsu Mikawa Line
- Distance: 38.2 kilometers from Sanage
- Platforms: 1 side platform

Other information
- Status: Unstaffed
- Station code: MU10
- Website: Official website

History
- Opened: July 10, 1915
- Former names: Shin Suma (to 1981)

Passengers
- FY2017: July 10, 1915

Services
Preceding station	Meitetsu	Following station
Shinkawa-machi towards Chiryū	Mikawa Line Chiryū–Hekinan	Hekinan Terminus
Location
- Location within Aichi Prefecture Location within Japan

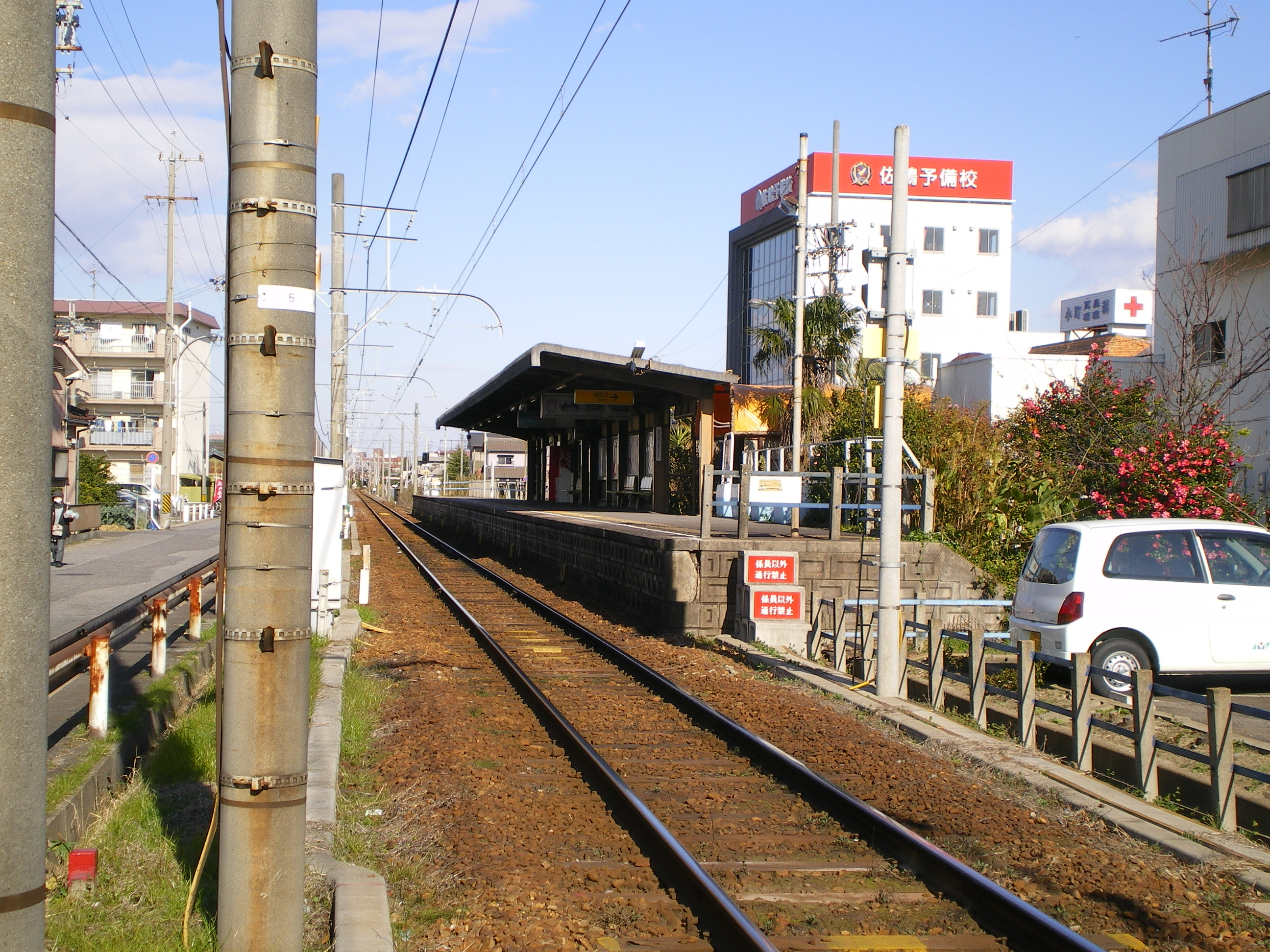
Platforms

Hekinan-chūō Station (碧南中央駅, Hekinan-chūō-eki) is a railway station in the city of Hekinan, Aichi Prefecture, Japan, operated by Meitetsu.

== Lines ==
Hekinan-chūō Station is served by the Meitetsu Mikawa Line, and is located 38.2 km (23.7 mi) from the starting point of the line at Sanage and 16.9 km (10.5 mi) from Chiryū.

== Station layout ==
The station has one side platform serving bi-directional traffic. The station has automatic turnstiles for the Tranpass system of magnetic fare cards, and is unattended.

== Station history ==
Hekinan-chūō Station was opened on February 5, 1914, as a temporary stop operating only during the summer vacation season for beachgoers on the privately owned Mikawa Railway Company. It was elevated to the status of a station on July 10, 1915, and named Shin Suma Station (新須磨駅, Shin Suma-eki). The Mikawa Railway Company was taken over by Meitetsu on June 1, 1941. The station was renamed to its present name on December 14, 1981.

== Passenger statistics ==
In fiscal 2017, the station was used by an average of 4484 passengers daily (boarding passengers only).

== Surrounding area ==
- Hekinan City Hall
- Hekinan High School
- Chūō Elementary School
- Chūō Junior High School

== See also ==
- List of railway stations in Japan
