= Chiryuppi =

Mascot of Chiryu City, Japan

- Description: Resident registration in Chiryu City
- Website: Chiryuppi’s Room

Chiryuppi is a yuru-kyara representing Chiryu City, Aichi Prefecture. Its purpose is to promote Chiryu City, Mikawa, and Aichi Prefecture nationwide. It is managed and operated by the Commerce, Industry, and Tourism Section of the Economic Affairs Division at Chiryu City Hall, Aichi Prefecture.

== Profile ==
- Gender - Boy
- Personality - Kind-hearted and easygoing
- Birthday - December 1
- Favorite Food - Anmaki (A sweet bean paste roll)
- Speech Pattern - Verb + "ppi" or "dappi"
- Clothing - Wears a horse themed hoodie featuring an iris brooch and the Chiryu City emblem. Carries an anmaki pouch over his shoulder. Inside are many treasures showcasing Chiryū City's charm.

== History ==
In 2001, local university students in Chiryu City created mascot characters "Narihira-kun" and "Kakitsu-hime-chan", which the city utilized for tourism promotion. Subsequently, the city designed mascot characters for various projects, but no costumes were made, and they failed to gain traction among citizens. In 2013, the local NPO "Bazaar Chiryu" created new characters "Kobotan" and "Anmaki-hime", handcrafting their costumes.

Amidst a proliferation of mascot characters, in September 2014 (Heisei 26), the city held a public contest for mascot character designs. From the top 10 entries selected by citizen vote, Chiryuppi was chosen as the grand prize winner. The creator was Junko Takayanagi, a graphic designer from Mishima City, Shizuoka Prefecture, who already had experience designing's Mishima City mascot characters, Mishimaru-kun and Mishimaru-ko-chan.

In March 2015, the local gas company "Fujipro" donated a Chiryuppi costume to the city as a community contribution commemorating its 60th anniversary.

In 2016, the official theme song "Chiryuppi, Chiryuppi" was released, with lyrics by Mika Miura and music by Yoshihiro Ando. This song also has a Bon dance version.

In 2024, a birthday party was held to commemorate its 10th anniversary. Kibō from Anjo City, Katsunari-kun from Kariya City, Iiwa-kun from Kōnan City, and Ryoha Kitagawa, PR Director for Chiruppi in Chiryu City, also took the stage.

== Activities ==
As a character promoting local publicity through various formats—including mascot costume events, merchandise sales, and web content like X and LINE stickers he actively engages the community. For example, he makes irregular appearances at local kindergartens and nursery schools. (Note: At that time, the style that appears without prior notice is used.)

He won the Runner-Up Grand Prix in the Chunichi Shimbun sponsored JIMO Character Grand Prix 2015.

In 2021, he won MVP at the "Inarinpikku Video Contest".

== Related topics ==
- Yuru-kyara
