= Hideaki Ōmura =

Japanese politician

- 大村 秀章
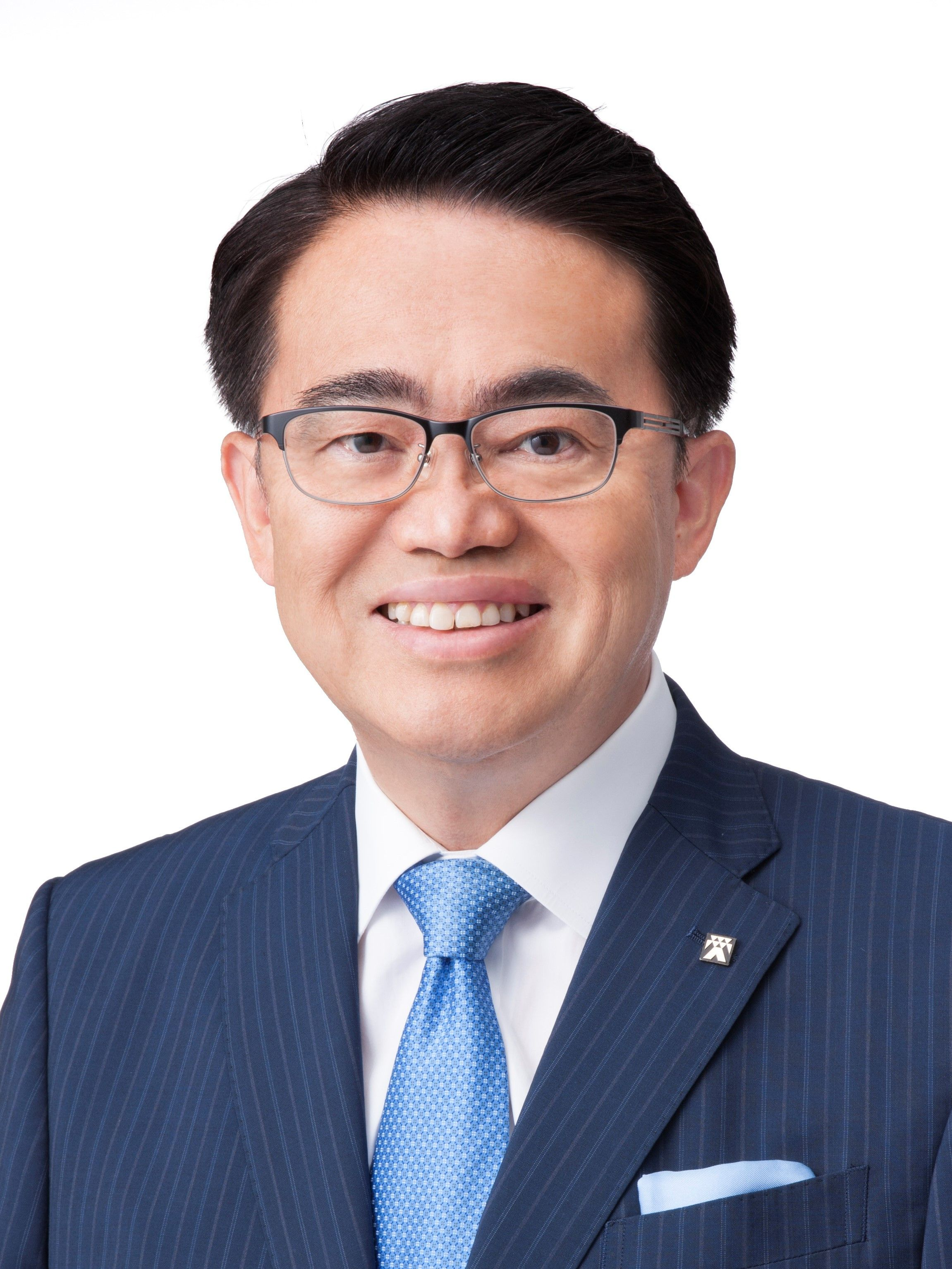
- Official portrait, 2018

Governor of Aichi Prefecture
- Incumbent
- Assumed office 15 February 2011
- Monarchs: Akihito; Naruhito
- Preceded by: Masaaki Kanda

Member of House of Representatives
- In office 20 October 1996 – 14 January 2011
- Preceded by: Constituency established
- Succeeded by: Yoshio Mochizuki
- Constituency: Tōkai PR (1996–2000); Aichi 13th (2000–2009); Tōkai PR (2009–2011)

Personal details
- Born: 9 March 1960 (age 66) Hekinan, Aichi, Japan
- Party: Independent (since 2011)
- Other political affiliations: LDP (before 2011)
- Children: 4
- Education: University of Tokyo
- Website: Official website

Hideaki Ōmura (大村 秀章, Ōmura Hideaki; born 9 March 1960) is a Japanese politician and the current governor of Aichi Prefecture and a former member of the House of Representatives.

== Early life and education ==
He was born on 9 March 1960 in Hekinan, Aichi Prefecture to a father who works as a carpenter and his mother who is a farmer. He graduated in University of Tokyo with a degree on law.

== Career ==
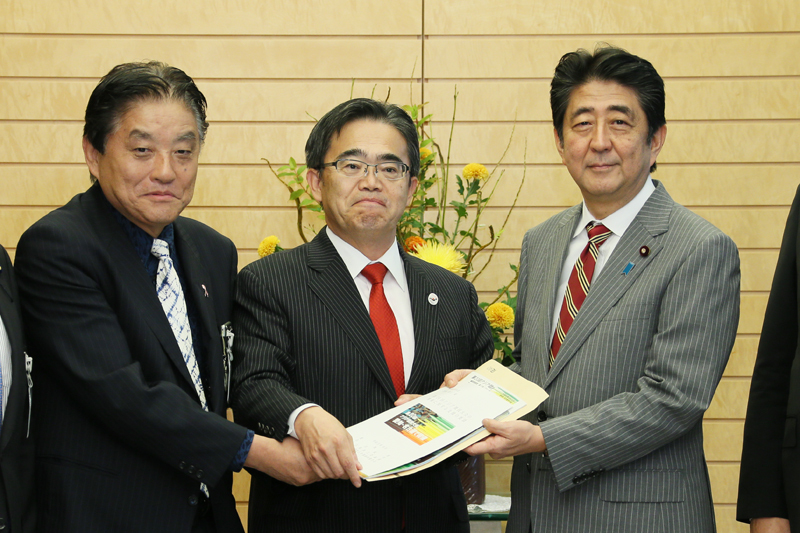
Ōmura with Takashi Kawamura and Shinzo Abe (at the Prime Minister's Official Residence on October 21, 2016)

In 1982, He joined the Ministry of Agriculture, Forestry and Fisheries after serving as Tokushima City Manager, Agricultural Cooperative Division, and Planning Division Assistant Director.

In 1995, He was Liberal Democratic Party Aichi Prefecture 13th constituency branch chief. A year later, he was elected as the House of Representatives member for the first time, he held the position for five terms until 2011.

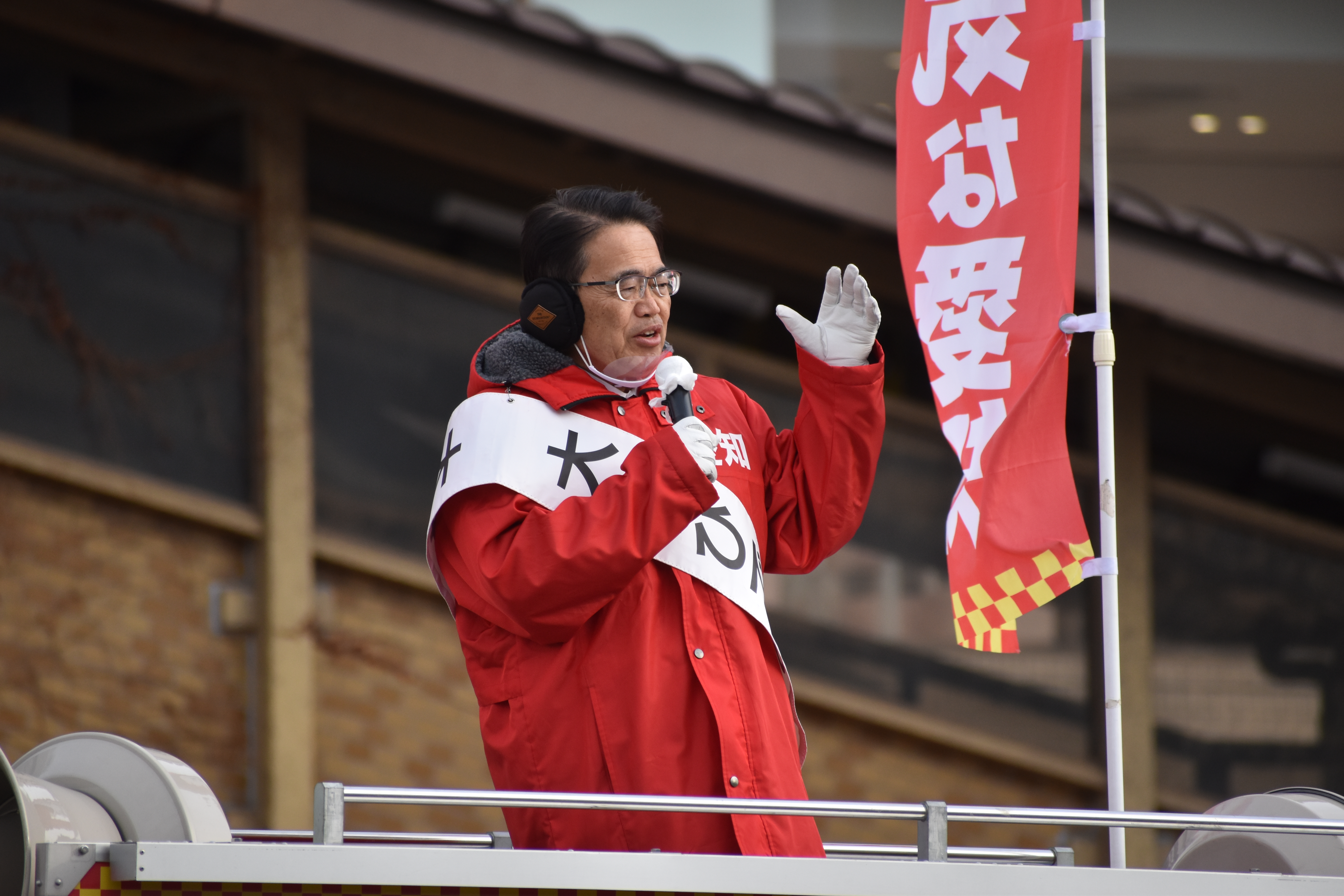
Omura giving a speech in front of Inuyama Station in 2023

He later run and won for governor of Aichi Prefecture on the 2011 gubernatorial election. He held the position until the present.

== Personal life ==
He is married and has four children.

| Preceded by Masaaki Kanda | Governor of Aichi Prefecture; 2011–present | Incumbent |
