= Ishiba Cabinet =

Ishiba Cabinet may refer to:

- First Ishiba Cabinet
- Second Ishiba Cabinet
