= Hekinan =

Hekinan 碧南市
- City
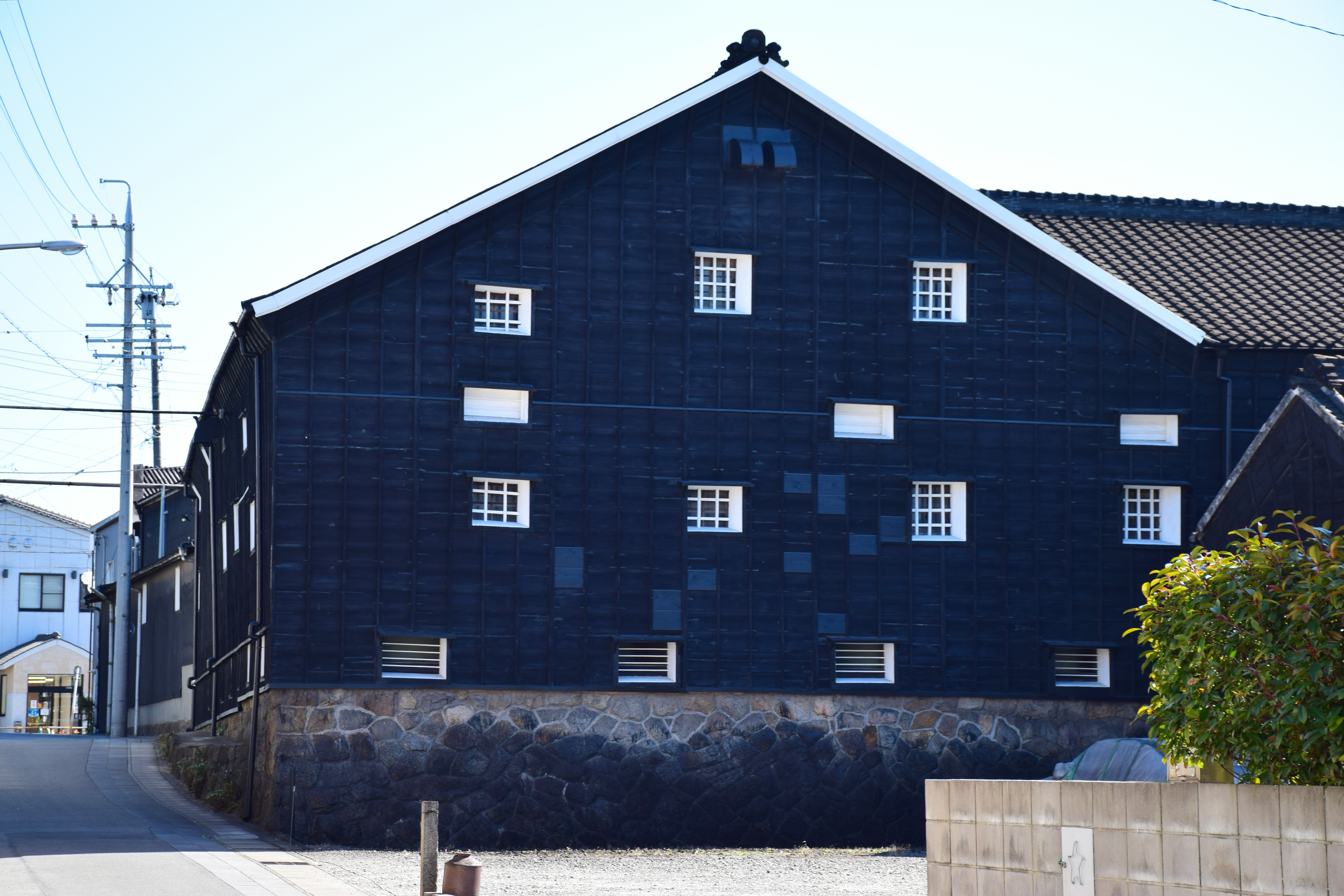
- Kokonoe Mirin Co., Ltd.

- Flag Seal

- Location of Hekinan in Aichi Prefecture

- Coordinates: 34°53′4.9″N 136°59′36.3″E
- Country: Japan
- Region: Chūbu (Tōkai)
- Prefecture: Aichi

Area
  - Total: 36.68 km^{2} (14.16 sq mi)

Population (October 1, 2019)
  - Total: 72,864
  - Density: 1,986/km^{2} (5,145/sq mi)
- Time zone: UTC+9 (Japan Standard Time)
  - Tree: Oak
  - Flower: Japanese iris
- Phone number: 0566-41-3311
- Address: 28 Matsumoto-chō, Hekinan-shi, Aichi-ken 447-8601
- Website: Official website

Hekinan (碧南市, Hekinan-shi) is a city in Aichi Prefecture, Japan. As of 1 October 2019, the city had an estimated population of 72,864 in 29,139 households, and a population density of 1,986 persons per km^{2}. The total area of the city was 36.68 square kilometres (14.16 sq mi).

== Geography ==
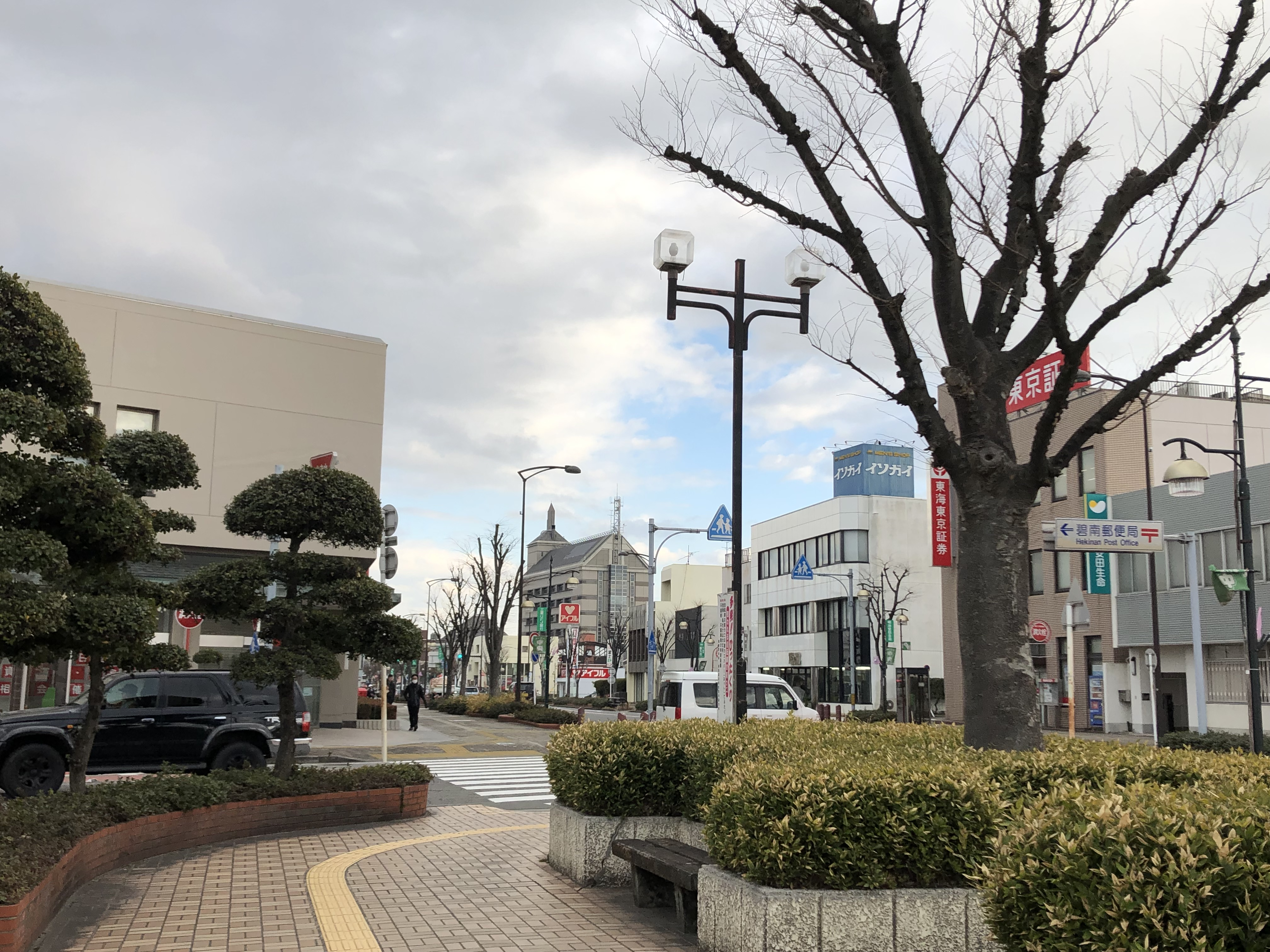
DownTown of HekinanCity

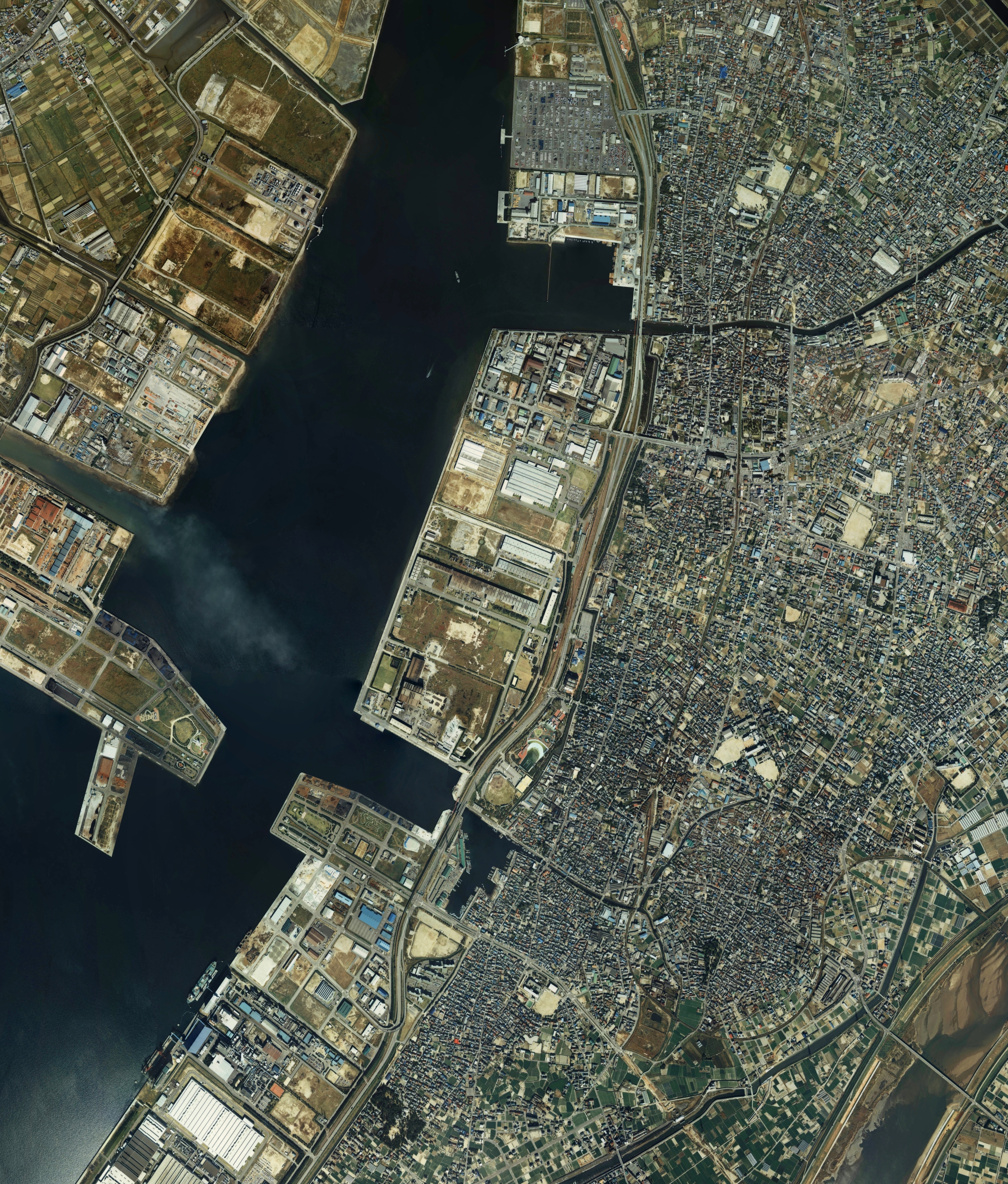
Hekinan city center, 1987

Hekinan is located in south-central Aichi Prefecture, and is surrounded by Lake Aburagafuchi, the Yahagi River, Kinuura Bay, and Mikawa Bay. Most of the city area lies on reclaimed ground, with an average elevation of under seven meters above sea level.

=== Climate ===
The city has a climate characterized by hot and humid summers, and relatively mild winters (Köppen climate classification Cfa). The average annual temperature in Hekinan is 15.7 °C. The average annual rainfall is 1609 mm with September as the wettest month. The temperatures are highest on average in August, at around 27.6 °C, and lowest in January, at around 4.6 °C.

Gamagōri, Aichi is the closet point that measures climate information.

Climate data for Gamagōri, Aichi (1971–2000)
Month	Jan	Feb	Mar	Apr	May	Jun	Jul	Aug	Sep	Oct	Nov	Dec	Year
Mean daily maximum °C (°F)	9.2 (48.6)	9.7 (49.5)	13.2 (55.8)	18.5 (65.3)	22.7 (72.9)	25.5 (77.9)	29.2 (84.6)	30.9 (87.6)	27.4 (81.3)	22.2 (72.0)	17.1 (62.8)	11.9 (53.4)	19.8 (67.6)
Daily mean °C (°F)	5.3 (41.5)	5.5 (41.9)	8.9 (48.0)	14.2 (57.6)	18.5 (65.3)	21.9 (71.4)	25.5 (77.9)	26.9 (80.4)	23.6 (74.5)	18.3 (64.9)	13.1 (55.6)	8.0 (46.4)	15.8 (60.4)
Mean daily minimum °C (°F)	2.0 (35.6)	1.9 (35.4)	4.9 (40.8)	10.1 (50.2)	14.7 (58.5)	18.8 (65.8)	22.6 (72.7)	23.8 (74.8)	20.7 (69.3)	14.9 (58.8)	9.6 (49.3)	4.5 (40.1)	12.4 (54.3)
Average precipitation mm (inches)	47.9 (1.89)	59.2 (2.33)	135.9 (5.35)	149.5 (5.89)	178.7 (7.04)	231.5 (9.11)	175.3 (6.90)	157.5 (6.20)	257.2 (10.13)	127.8 (5.03)	93.0 (3.66)	38.9 (1.53)	1,649.8 (64.95)
Mean monthly sunshine hours	169.3	173.6	192.9	196.4	190.9	137.0	163.9	215.4	150.4	168.3	169.2	183.9	2,110.7

=== Demographics ===
Per Japanese census data, the population of Hekinan has been increasing steadily over the past 50 years.

Historical population
Year	Pop.	±%
1950	45,491	—
1960	50,116	+10.2%
1970	56,933	+13.6%
1980	62,021	+8.9%
1990	65,899	+6.3%
2000	67,814	+2.9%
2010	72,020	+6.2%

=== Surrounding municipalities ===
Aichi Prefecture

- Anjō
- Nishio
- Takahama

== History ==
=== Ancient history ===
The area is part of ancient Mikawa Province.

=== Early modern period ===
Under then Edo period, Tokugawa Shogunate, much of what is now Hekinan was part of the holdings of Numazu Domain, with the remainder being tenryō territory under direct control of the shogunate.

=== Late modern period ===
Widespread rioting occurred in the area against the new Meiji government and its policy of shinbutsu bunri in 1871. The area was organized into towns and villages within Hekikai District by the Meiji period establishment of the modern municipalities system in 1889.

=== Contemporary history ===
Showa period

The towns of Ohama, Shinkawa and Tanao, and the village of Asahi merged on April 5, 1948, to form the city of Hekinan As it is located on the southern (南) part of Hekikai District (碧海郡), the city was named Hekinan (碧南). Hekinan was the tenth city founded in Aichi Prefecture. Since it had harbors and rails, the city developed quickly after Pacific War.

On April 1, 1955, one part of the village of Meiji, which is currently called Nishibata, was incorporated into Hekinan.

On September 26, 1959, Typhoon Vera also known as the "Isewan Typhoon" heavily damaged the city.

On July 14, 1974, Rinkai Kōen Pool or also known as Kinuura Mammoth Pool was opened.

Because the city reclaimed the seaside for industrial purposes in 1960's, Hekinan opened this pool for people who complained about losing their beautiful beach.

On May 23, 1988, Hekinan Municipal Hospital was opened.

Heisei period

In 1993, Hekinan Thermal Power Station was created by Chubu Electric Power on the reclaimed ground. This provides high tax revenue to the city. On August 17, 2003, since the facility of the Rinkai Kōen Pool became old and the number of the visitors of the pool was reduced, the city shut down the pool. Instead, the city created Hekinan Rinkai Park on the same place.

== Government ==
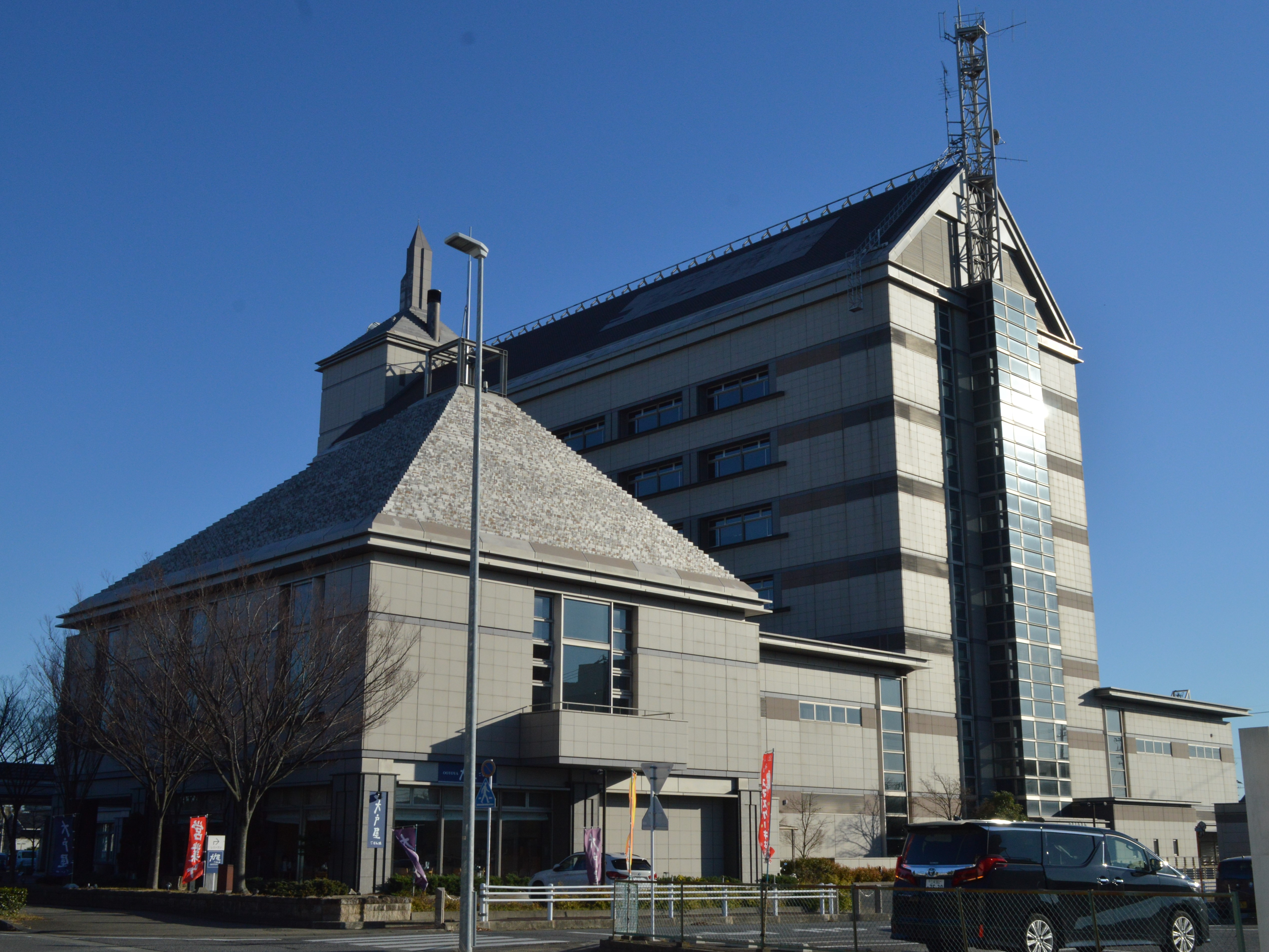
Hekinan City Hall

Hekinan has a mayor-council form of government with a directly elected mayor and a unicameral city legislature of 22 members, which is considerably higher than other cities of similar size. The city contributes one member to the Aichi Prefectural Assembly. In terms of national politics, the city is part of Aichi District 13 of the lower house of the Diet of Japan.

== Economy ==
Hekinan is one of the wealthiest cities in Japan. Its financial capability index is 1.70. Automobile-related components, metal, tile, and food processing are the main industries in the city. In 2006 the number of factories was 463 with 16,778 workers. The value of shipments was 84,356,533 million yen in total in 2006. The Hekinan Thermal Power Station is one of largest thermal power plants in the world.

=== Primary sector of the economy ===
==== Agriculture ====
Even though only 4% of the population of Hekinan engage in agriculture, one-quarter of the area is farmland. The main products are carrots, onions, potatoes and figs. Anjo and Hekinan are the largest producer of figs in Japan.

=== Secondary sector of the economy ===
==== Manufacturing ====
- Automobile

In 2010, there were 9,148 people working in this industry, shipping products worth 47,058,959 yen which is more than half of the amount of shipments in the city. Toyota Industries is the biggest company for the industry in the city. There were 1,722 Toyota employees in Hekinan, or about 10% of the total industrial workers in the city in 2010.

- Ceramic tile

One remarkable industry in the city is related to ceramic roofing tiles. Hekinan is one of the cities that produce Sanshu kawara, a well-known regional brand. In Japan, 58 per cent of tiles, which is about 50,000,000 tiles, are Sanshu kawara.

== Education ==
Hekinan has seven public elementary schools and five public junior high schools operated by the city government, and two public high schools operated by the Aichi Prefectural Board of Education. The prefecture also operates one special education school for the handicapped.

=== High schools ===
- Hekinan High School
- Hekinan Technical High School

=== Middle schools ===
- Hekinan Chūō Middle School
- Hekinan Higashi Middle School
- Hekinan Minami Middle School
- Hekinan Nishibata Middle School
- Hekinan Shinkawa Middle School

=== Elementary schools ===
- Hekinan Chūō Elementary School
- Hekinan Nishibata Elementary School
- Hekinan Nisshin Elementary School
- Hekinan Ōhama Elementary School
- Hekinan Shinkawa Elementary School
- Hekinan Tanao Elementary School
- Hekinan Washizuka Elementary School

=== International schools ===
- Escola Alegria de Saber (エスコーラ・アレグリア・デ・サベール) – Brazilian school (Ensinos Fundamental e Médio)

== Transportation ==
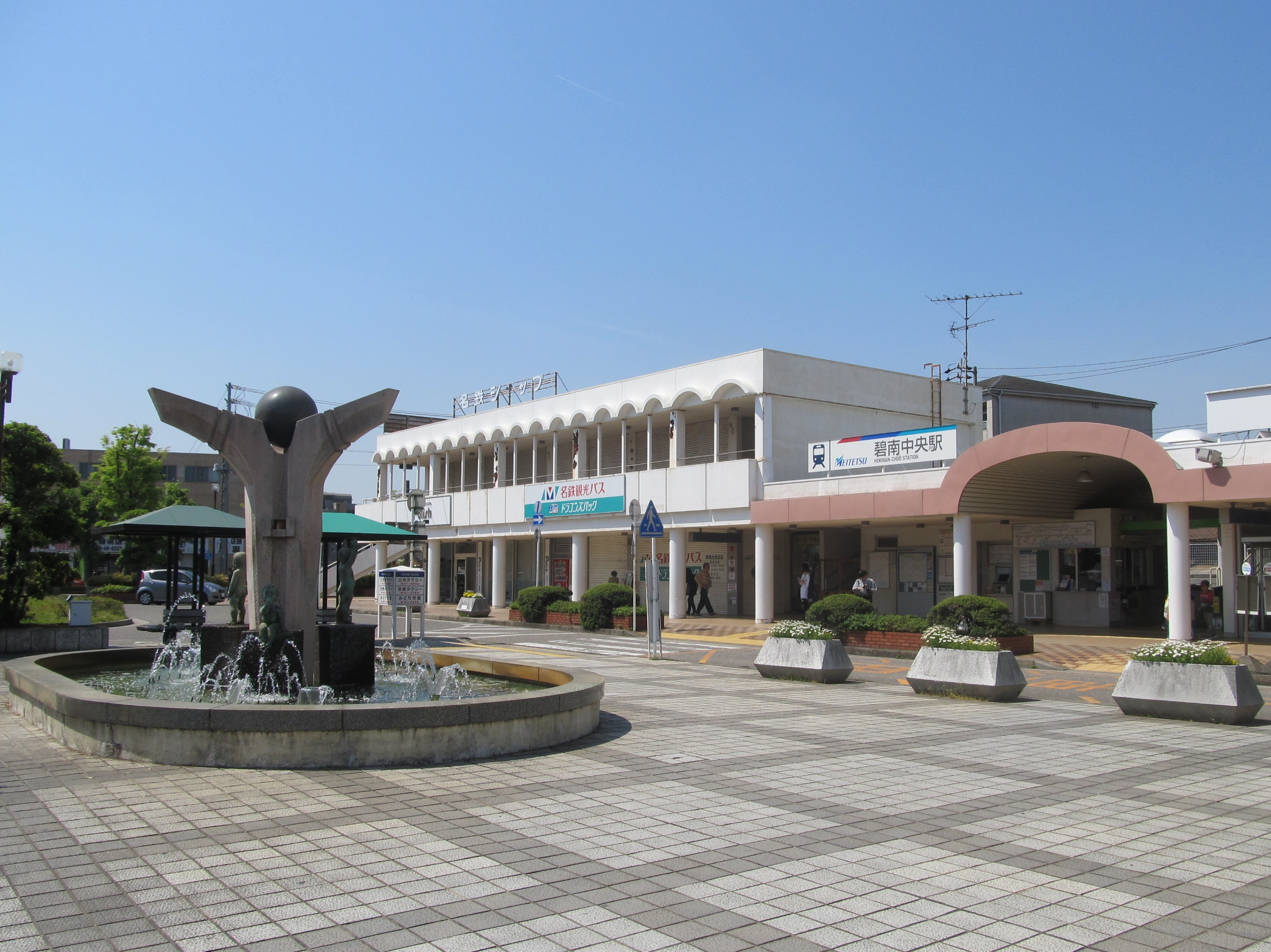
Hekinan-chūō Station

=== Railway ===
Meitetsu

- Meitetsu Mikawa Line: (Takahama)- Kitashinkawa – Shinkawamachi – Hekinan Chūō – Hekinan (Terminus)

Kinuura Rinkai Railway

- Hekinan Line: (Takahama)- Hekinanshi – Gongenzaki (Terminus)

=== Roads ===
==== Japan National Route ====
- National Route 247

==== Prefectural road ====
- Aichi Prefectural road 43
- Aichi Prefectural road 45
- Aichi Prefectural road 46
- Aichi Prefectural road 50
- Aichi Prefectural road 265
- Aichi Prefectural road 291
- Aichi Prefectural road 295
- Aichi Prefectural road 301
- Aichi Prefectural road 302
- Aichi Prefectural road 303
- Aichi Prefectural road 304
- Aichi Prefectural road 305
- Aichi Prefectural road 306
- Aichi Prefectural road 307

=== Seaways ===
==== Seaport ====
- Kinuura Bay Port
  - Ohama Port
  - Shinkawa Port
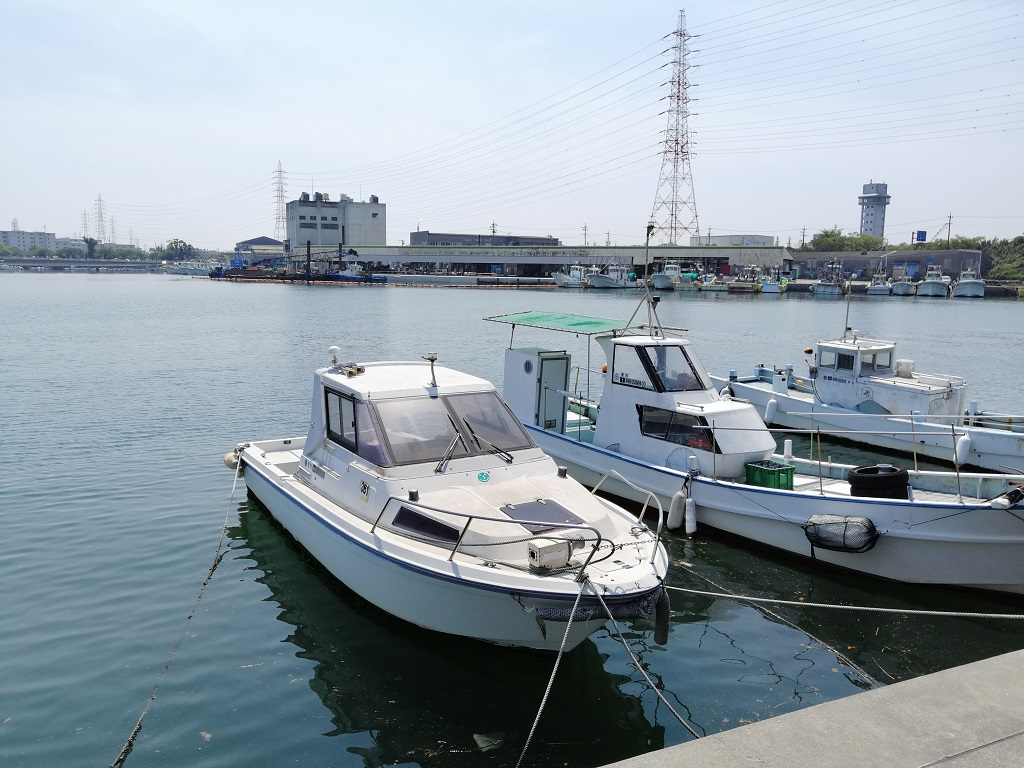
Ohama Port

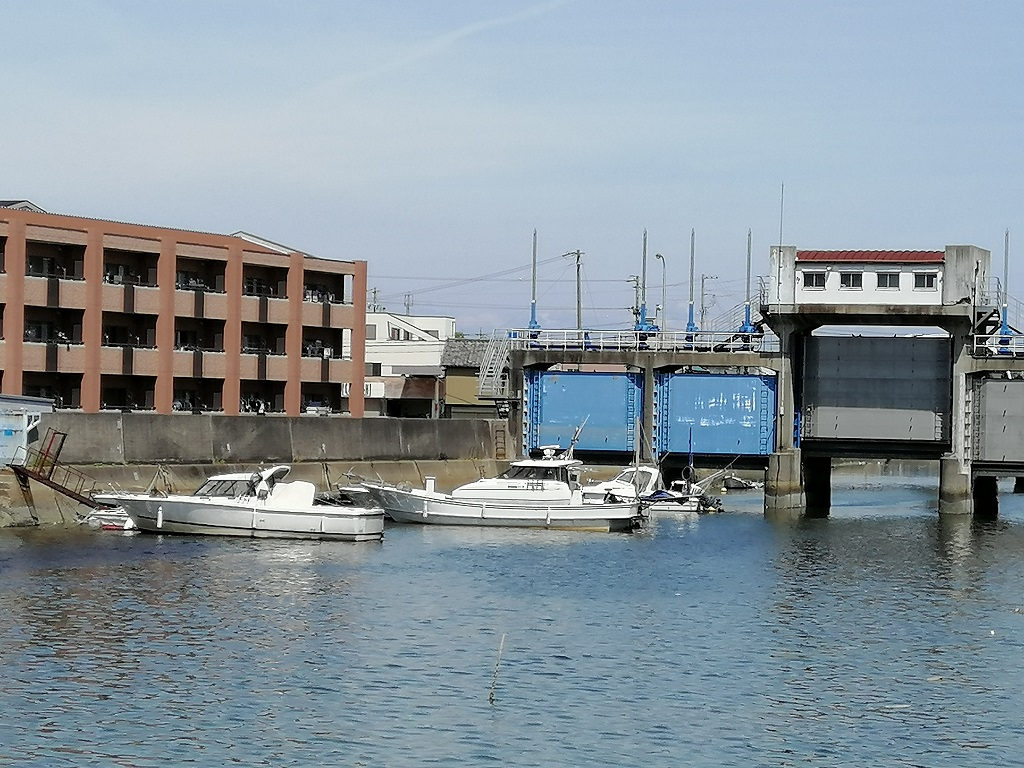
Shinkawa Port

== Sister cities ==
Hekinan is twinned with:

- Edmonds, Washington, United States, since April 5, 1988

To build Hekinan citizen's international sensibility, the city was looking for a sister city relationship with a city on the Pacific coast. At the same time, Edmonds was considering a relationship with a Japanese cities. Edmonds sent officials to Hekinan in 1986. The two cities started exchanging people for home stay. Two years later, at the ceremony of 40th anniversary of Hekinan, the two cities established a sister city relationship.
- In 1998, the Hekinan city hall hosted the sculpture by Steve Jensen to celebrate 10th anniversary of the relationships.
- In 2004, Twenty five Hekinan artists, residents, and officials visited Edmonds to dedicate the Friendship Tree on the Edmonds waterfront.
- In 2008, Mayor Gary Haakenson visited Hekinan with 18 citizens to celebrate 20th anniversary

- Pula, Croatia, since April 5, 2005.

In April 2005, the Deputy Prime Minister of Croatia visited to Hekinan to participate in Expo 2005. During the stay, the Vice Prime Minister proposed to have a sister cities relationships between Croatian cities. Hekinan sent officials to Pula in 2006. On April 5, 2007, Hekinan invited the Mayor of Pula for the 59th anniversary and established a sister city relationship between the two cities.

- (Japan) Yuni, Hokkaido, since April 5, 1988

About 20 people from Hekikaigun moved to Yuni, Mikawa. Since the sounds of the regions were the same, they developed this region very well. This connection made two cities have the sister city relationship at the same date that Edmonds signed the relationship between Hekinan.

- (Japan) Toyota, Aichi Prefecture, since April 5, 1992

== Local attractions ==
- Aoi park
- Akashi Park
- Hekinan Rinkai park
  - Hekinan Rinkai Gym
  - Hekinan Rinkai park ground
  - Hekinan Sea Side Aquarium (碧南海浜水族館)
- Hekinan Tatsukichi Fujii Museum of Contemporary Art
- Mugaen – Philosophy Taiken Village
- Myōfuku-ji (妙福寺/志貴毘沙門天)
- Shōmyō-ji – A temple related to Tokugawa Ieyasu.
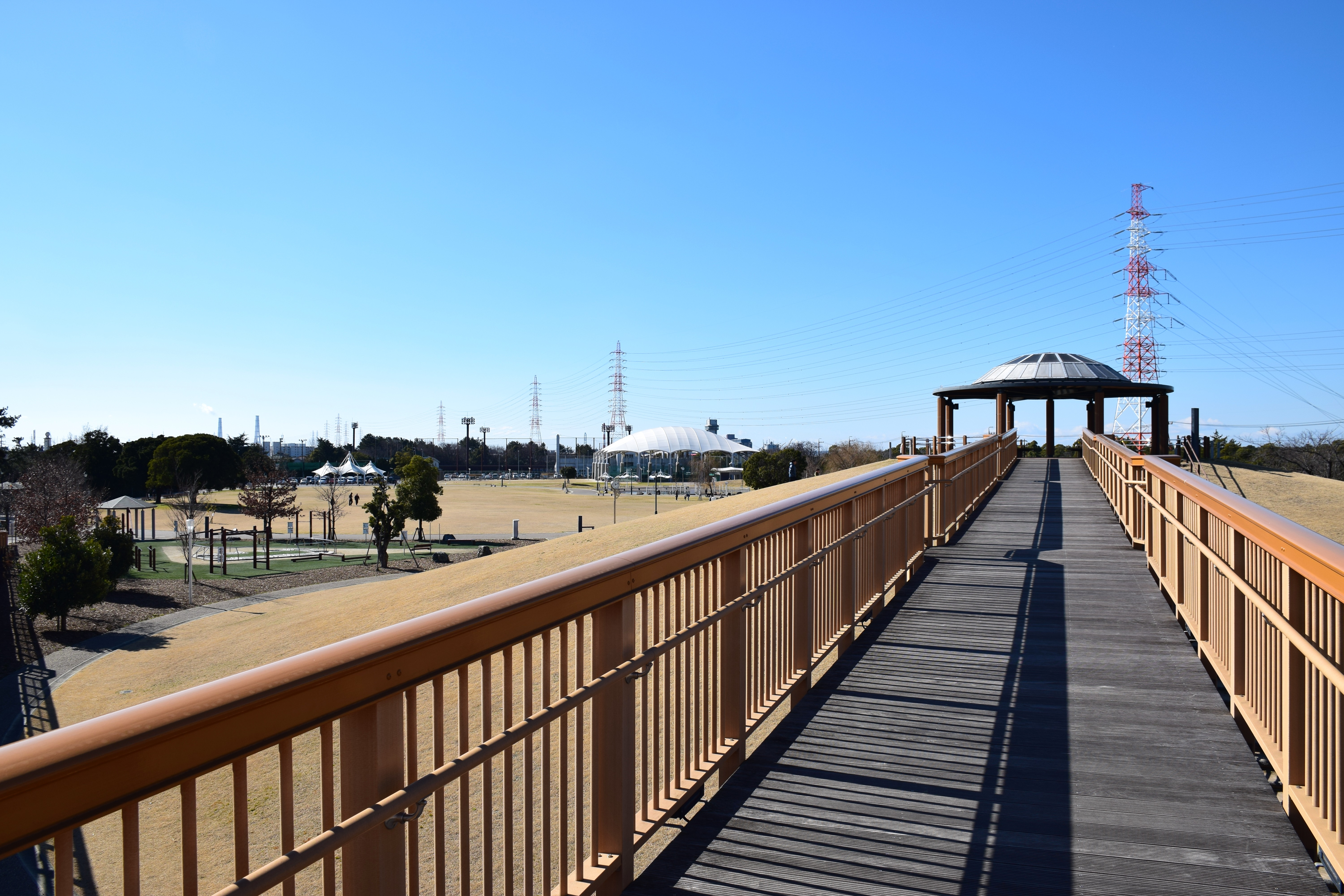
Hekinan Rinkai park

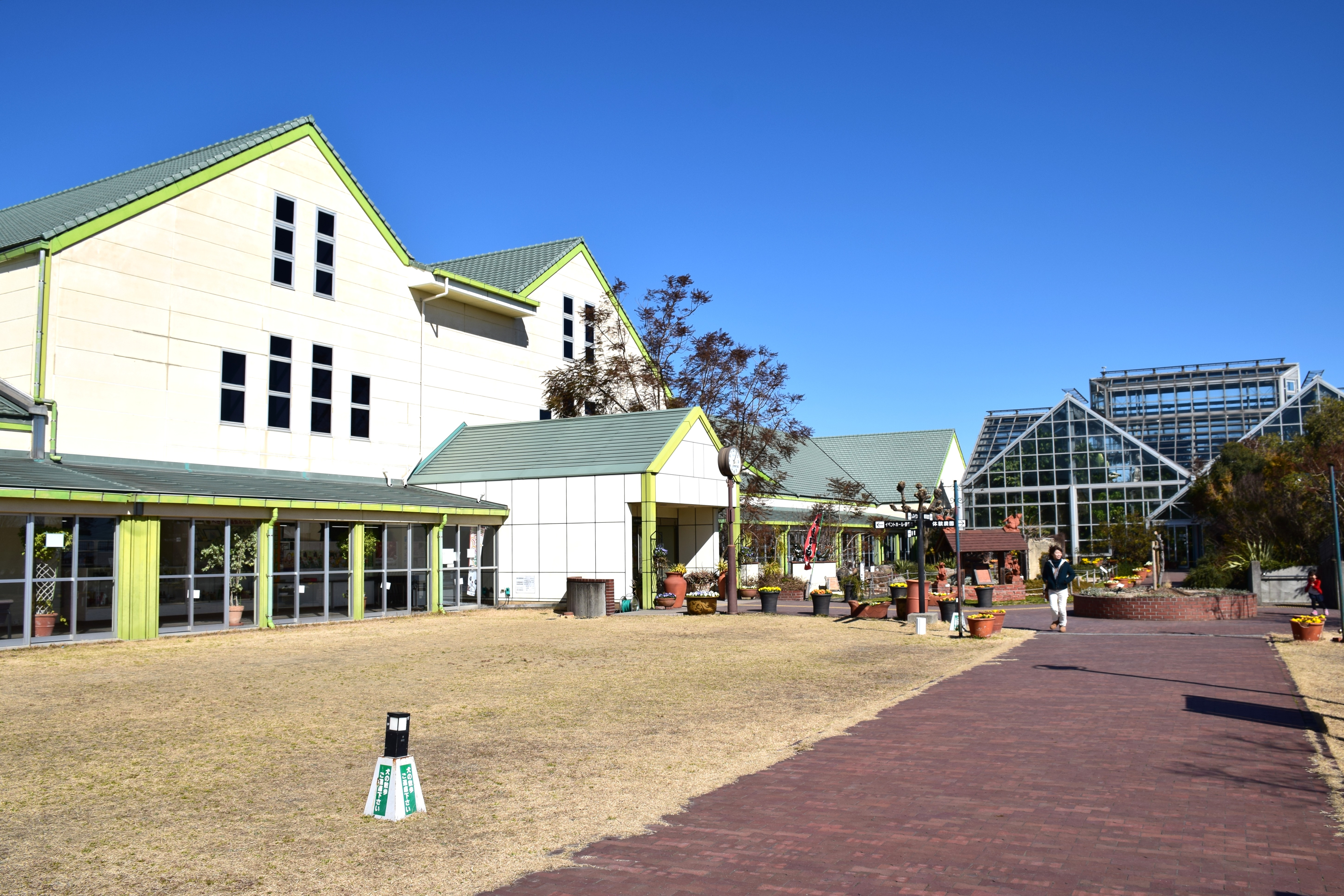
Aoi park

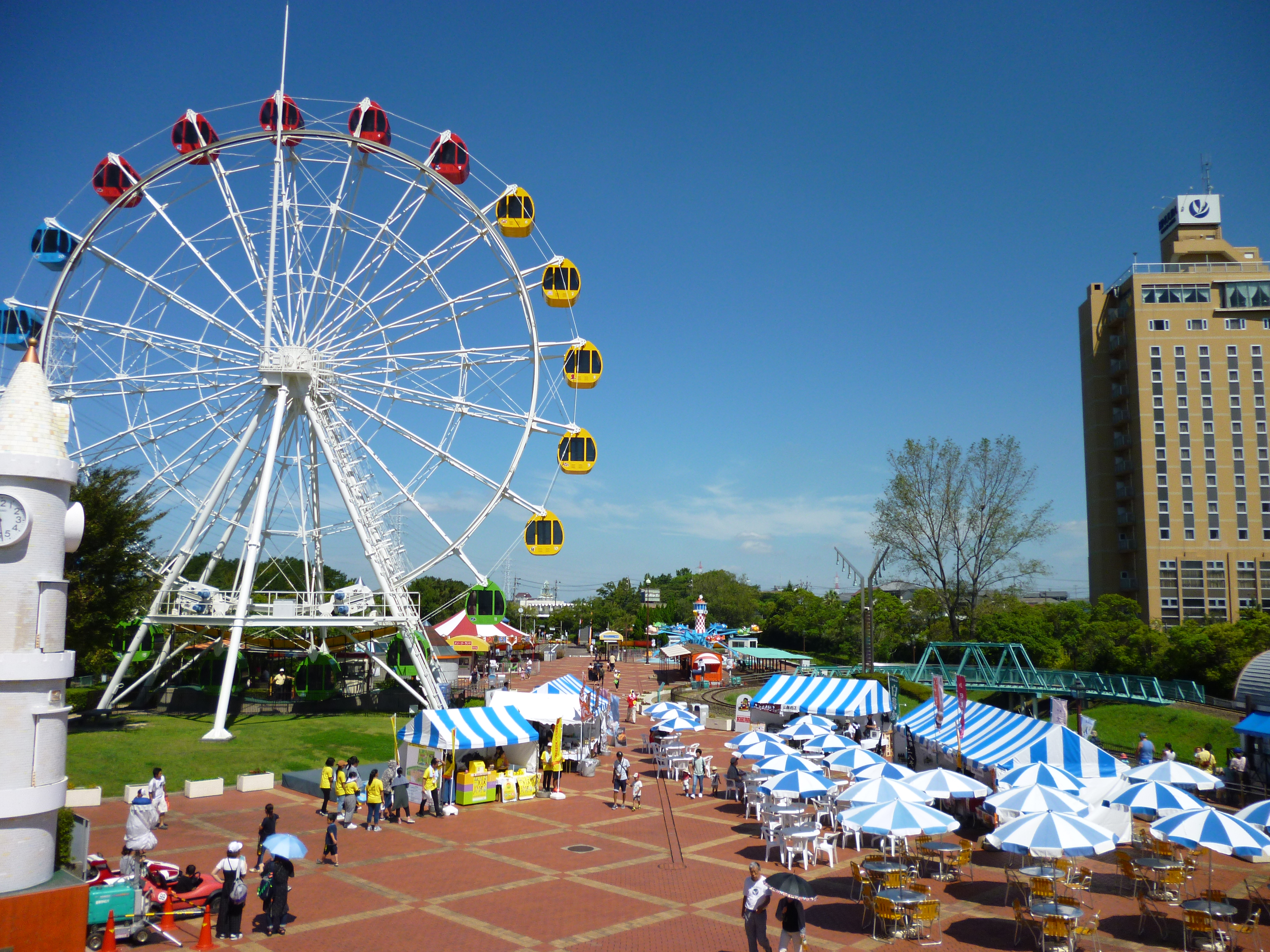
Akashi Park

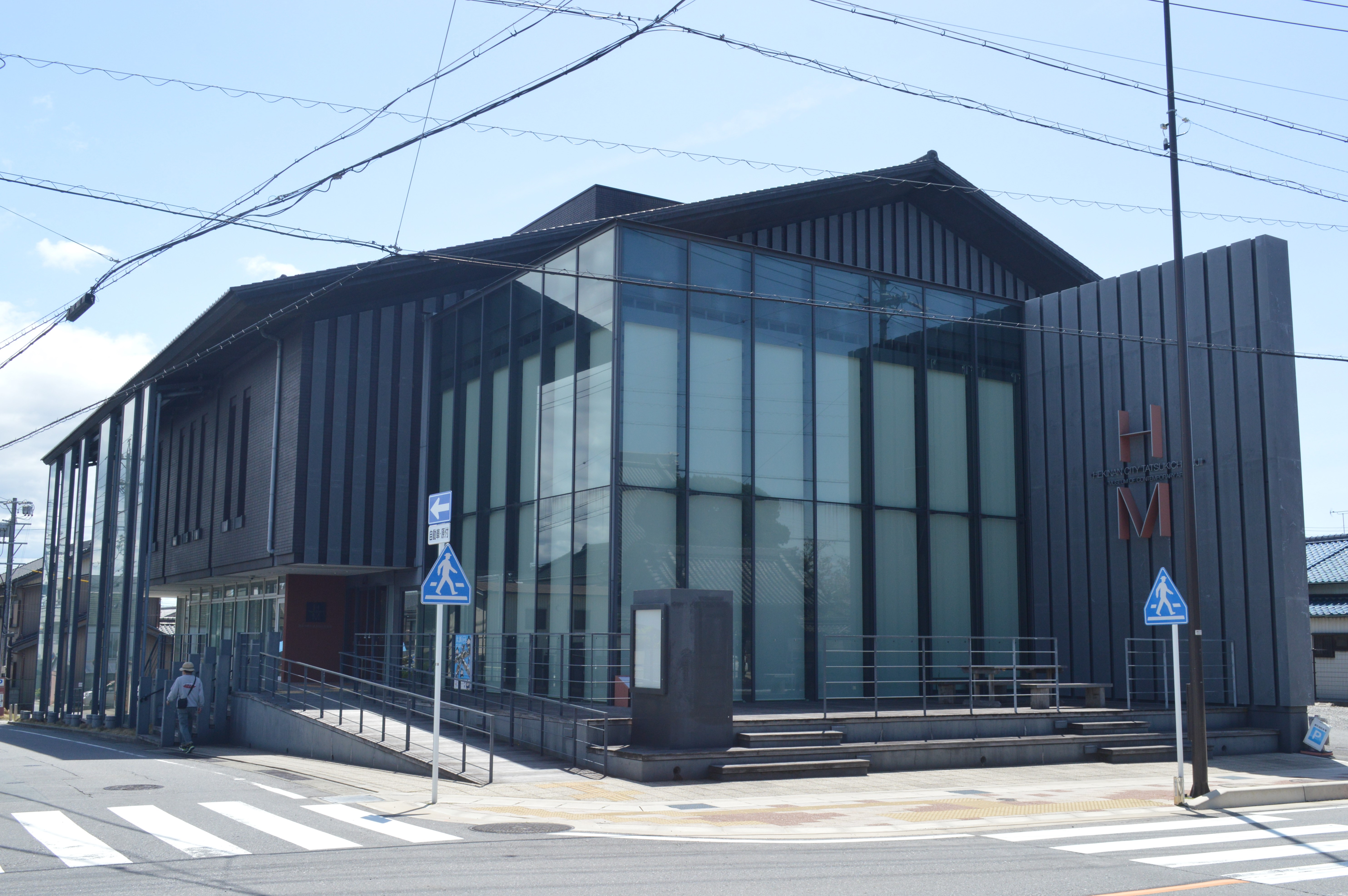
Hekinan Tatsukichi Fujii Museum of Contemporary Art

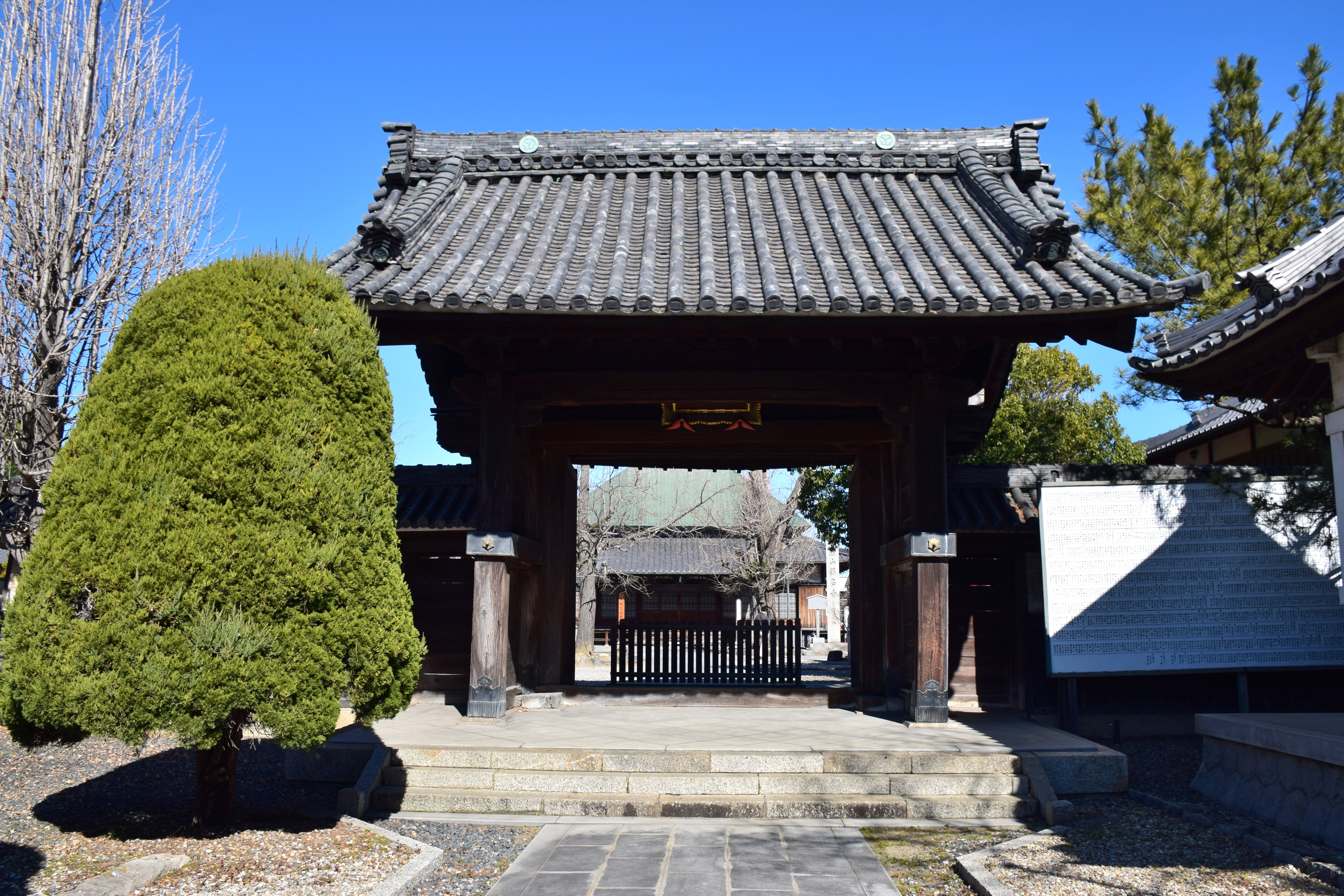
Shōmyō-ji

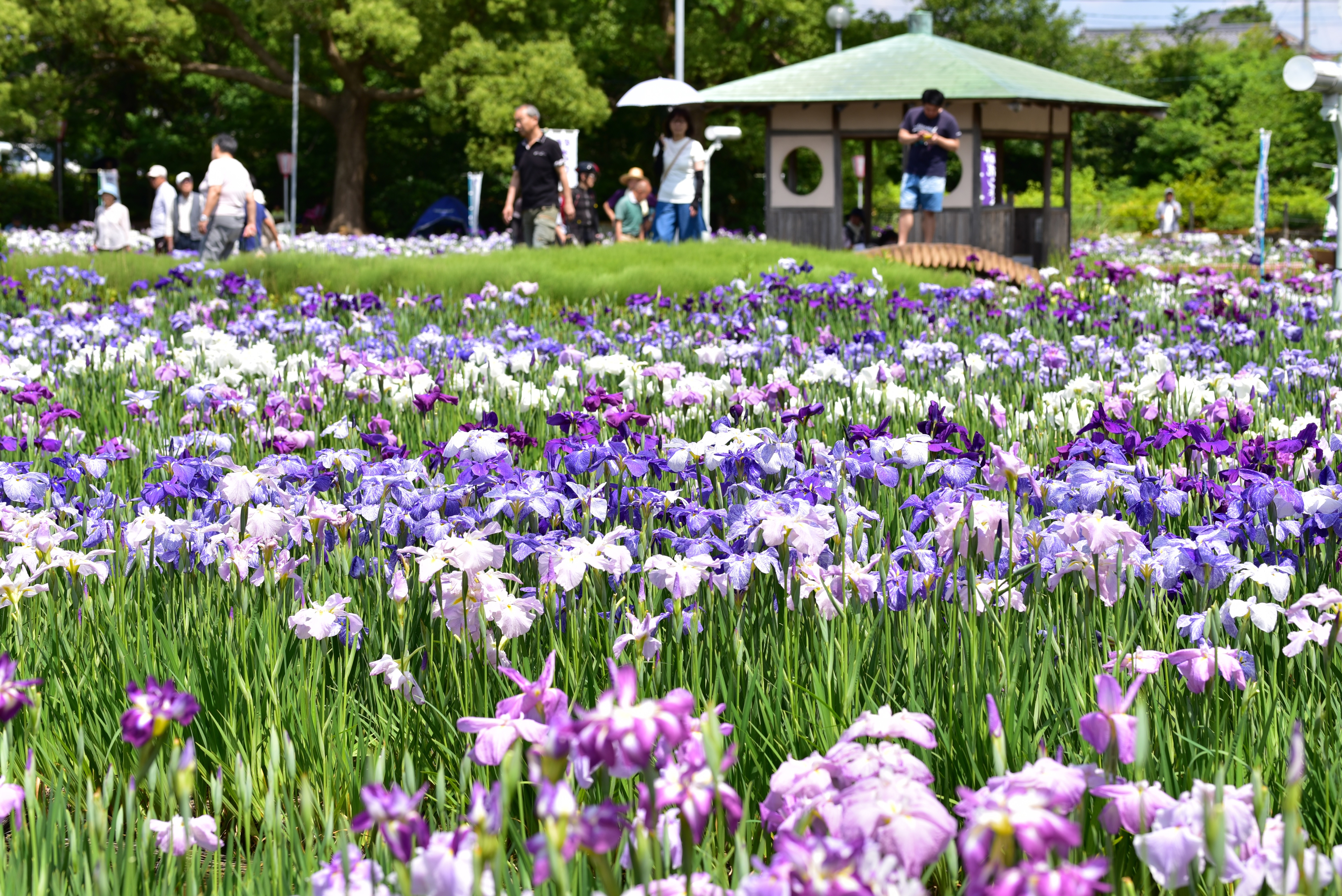
Aburagabuchi park

== Culture ==
=== Festivals ===
Various festivals are held throughout the year in Hekinan.

Schedule of Festivals
Name	Date	Location	Details
Cherry Blossom Festival	From March to April	Onin-ji, Akashi Park, Nakayamashinmei shrine, Yahagi river	Many events related to cherry blossoms. During nighttime, the trees are illuminated along the Yahagi River.
Shiki Bishamonten Spring Festival	April 3	Myōfuku-ji (妙福寺/志貴毘沙門天)	Pray for your and your family's happiness.
Nishiōninji Rennyohi	From April 19 to 25	Ōnin-ji	Buddhist event. Tea ceremony and other events held.
Spring Rennyo walking	April	Ōnin-ji	"Walk-rally", Haiku contests, etc. are held.
Kōtō Garden Wisteria Festival	From April to May	Kōtō Garden	Enjoy Wistaria. There are a tea ceremony, which costs 500 yen including Japanese snack. During the night time, wistaria is illuminated by paper lanterns.
Shōmyō-ji Tōshō-gū Festival	May 5	Shōmyō-ji	A lot of cultural assets, especially assets that related to Tokugawa, are treasured. Tokugawa Ieyasu's ancestor's graves exist in the temple. Variety of the events are held.
Henjō-in Three faces Jikokuten Spring Festival	May 5	Henjō-in	Pay for success in business, etc.
Hekinan Lake Aburagafuchi Oak Festival	From May to June	Lake Aburagafuchi and Ōnin-ji	Art contests, Tea ceremony, etc. are held. There are about 3 million oak trees, more than 100 types of oak tree illuminated by paper lanterns at night.
Saigu Jinja Hydrangea Festival	Second Sunday of June	Saigu Jinja	Selling Hydrangea, Nagashi Sōmen events are held.
Abacus Festival	August 8 (8-8 pronounce like abacus' sound so August 8 is Abacus day)	Shōmyō-ji	Thanksgiving for old abacus.
Lake Aburagafuchi fishing contests	Second Sunday of September	Lake Aburagafuchi	Free fishing contest at Lake Aburagafuch
Ōhama Teramachi "Haiking" (Haiku Festival)	Third Sunday of October	Ōhama	Haiku contests. The theme of Haiku is town. Participants walk around Ōhama and writing haiku poetry.
Shiki Bishamonten Fall Festival	November 3	Myōfuku-ji (妙福寺/志貴毘沙門天)	Pray for your and your family's happiness.
Henjō-in Three faces Daikokuten Fall Festival	November 11	Henjō-in	Pay for success in business, etc.

== Notable people from Hekinan ==
- Hideaki Ōmura, politician
- Kenzo Suzuki, professional wrestler
