= Kariya Domain =

Coordinates: 34°59′19″N 136°59′0.4″E

Kariya Domain 刈屋藩
- Domain of Japan
- 1600–1871
- Capital: Kariya Castle
  - Type: Daimyō
- Historical era: Edo period
  - Established: 1600
  - Disestablished: 1871
- Today part of: Aichi Prefecture

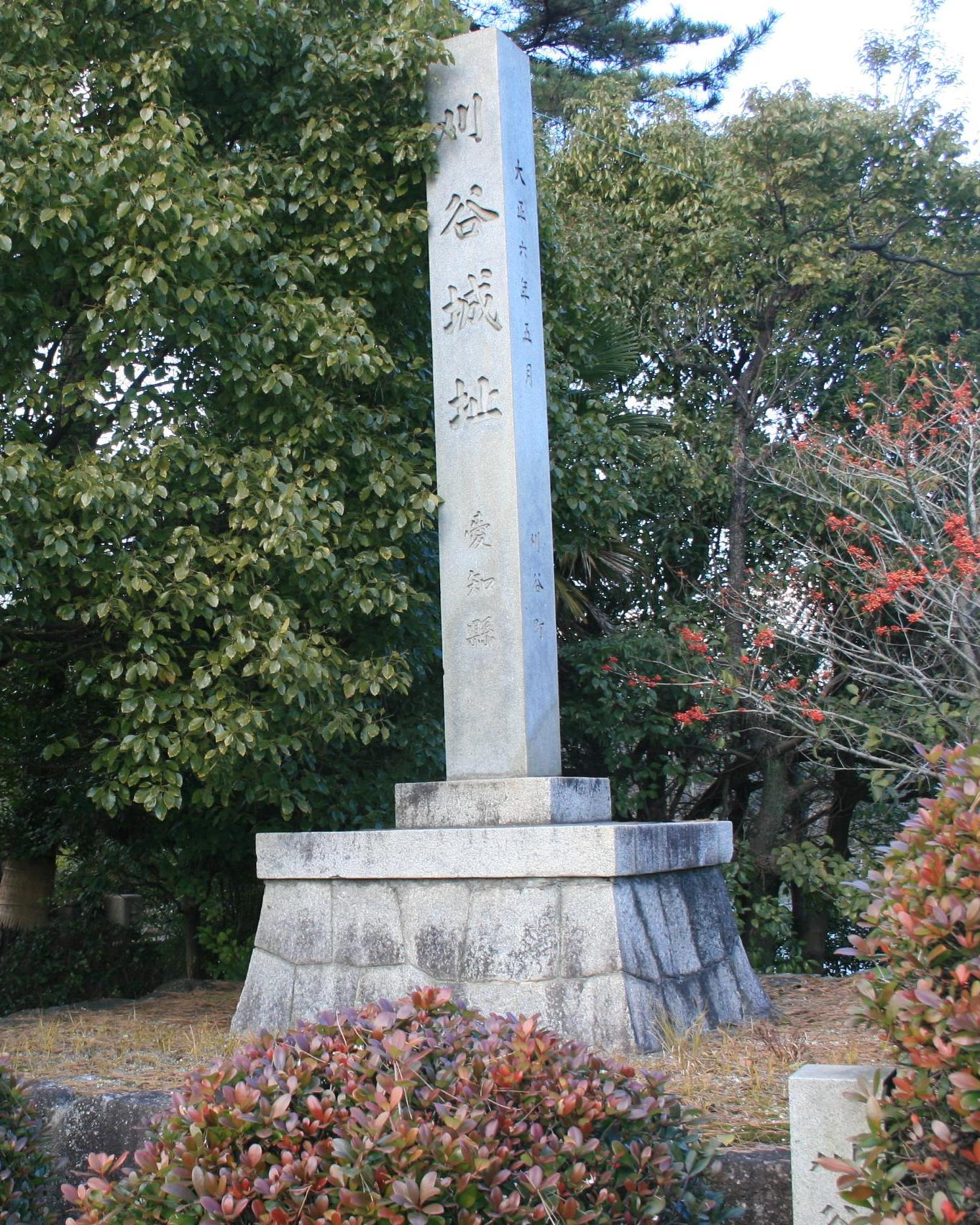
Monument marking the location of Kariya Castle, administrative center of Kariya Domain

Kariya Domain (刈屋藩, Kariya han) was a feudal domain of the Edo period Tokugawa shogunate located in Mikawa Province (modern-day Aichi Prefecture), Japan, what is now part of the modern-day cities of Kariya and Anjō. It was centered on Kariya Castle, which was located in what is now the city of Kariya.

== History ==
During the Sengoku period, the area of Kariya Domain was part of the territory of Tokugawa Ieyasu’s mother’s family, the Mizuno clan. Ieyasu’s maternal grandfather Mizuno Tadamasa built Kariya Castle. The Mizuno clan shifted allegiances adroitly between the Imagawa clan to Oda Nobunaga and to Toyotomi Hideyoshi, who relocated the clan to Ise Province. However, Mizuno Katsunari, the grandson of Tadamasa was allowed to return to the clan’s ancestral territories by Ieyasu after the Battle of Sekigahara. He was later awarded with more lucrative territories in western Japan, and replaced by Mizuno Tadakiyo from another branch of the clan based at Obata Domain in Kōzuke Province. In 1632, he was transferred to nearby Yoshida Domain, and was replaced by Matsudaira Tadafusa to 1647, followed by Matsudaira Sadamasa (from a different branch of the Matsudaira clan) to 1651. The domain was thereafter in the hands of the Inagaki clan, Abe clan, Honda clan, Miura clan and finally the Doi clan from 1734 until the Meiji restoration.

The next-to-last daimyō of Kariya Domain, Doi Toshiyoshi, despite holding several important posts within the administration of the Tokugawa shogunate, gave shelter to the rebels from the Tenchūgumi Incident and was forced to resign. His adopted son Doi Toshinori presided over a domain in a state of civil war between pro-shogunate and pro-sonnō jōi forces during the Boshin War and was unable to fulfill his assigned duty to hold Sumpu Castle for the shogunate. After the abolition of the han system in July 1871, the domain became “Kariya Prefecture”, which later became part of Aichi Prefecture.

Kariya Domain was not a single contiguous territory, but consisted of 22 villages in Hekikai District in Mikawa and 11 villages in Date District, Mutsu Province at the time of the Bakumatsu period. The domain had a population of 19,850 people in 4927 households per the 1870 census. The domain maintained its primary residence (kamiyashiki) in Edo at Akasaka.

== List of daimyō ==
| # | Name | Tenure | Courtesy title | Court Rank | kokudaka |
|---|---|---|---|---|---|
Mizuno clan (fudai) 1600–1615
| 1 | Mizuno Katsunari (水野勝成) | 1600–1615 | Hyuga-no-kami (日向守) | Lower 5th (従五位下) | 30,000 koku |
Mizuno clan (fudai) 1616–1632
| 1 | Mizuno Tadakiyo (水野忠清) | 1616–1632 | Hayato-no-kami (隼人正) | Lower 5th (従五位下) | 20,000 koku |
Matsudaira clan (fudai) 1632–1649
| 1 | Matsudaira Tadafusa (松平(深溝)忠房) | 1632–1649 | Tonomo-no-kami (主殿頭) | Lower 5th (従五位下) | 30,000 koku |
Matsudaira clan (fudai) 1649–1651
| 1 | Matsudaira Tadamasa (松平(久松)定政) | 1649–1651 | Noto-no-kami (能登守) | Lower 5th (従五位下) | 20,000 koku |
Inagaki clan (fudai) 1651-1702
| 1 | Inagaki Shigetsuna (稲垣重綱) | 1651–1654 | Settsu-no-kami (摂津守) | Lower 5th (従五位下) | 23,000 koku |
| 2 | Inagaki Shigeaki (稲垣重昭) | 1654–1687 | Shinano-no-kami (信濃守) | Lower 5th (従五位下) | 23,000 koku |
| 3 | Inagaki Shigetomi (稲垣重富) | 1687–1702 | Izumi-no-kami (和泉守) | Lower 5th (従五位下) | 23,000 koku |
Abe clan (fudai) 1702-1710
| 1 | Abe Masaharu (阿部正春) | 1702–1709 | Iyo-no-kami (伊予守) | Lower 5th (従五位下) | 16,000 koku |
| 2 | Abe Masatane (阿部正鎮) | 1709–1710 | Inaba-no-kami (因幡守) | Lower 5th (従五位下) | 16,000 koku |
Honda clan (fudai) 1710–1712
| 1 | Honda Tadayoshi (本多忠良) | 1710–1712 | Nakatsukasa-no-taifu (中務大輔); Jiju (侍従) | Lower 4th (従四位下) | 50,000 koku |
Miura clan (fudai) 1712-1747
| 1 | Miura Akihiro (三浦明敬) | 1712–1724 | Iki-no-kami (壱岐守) | Lower 5th (従五位下) | 23,000 koku |
| 2 | Miura Akitaka (三浦明喬) | 1724–1726 | Iki-no-kami (壱岐守) | Lower 5th (従五位下) | 23,000 koku |
| 3 | Miura Yoshisato (三浦義理) | 1726–1747 | Shima-no-kami (志摩守) | Lower 5th (従五位下) | 23,000 koku |
Doi clan (fudai) 1747-1871
| 1 | Doi Toshinobu (土井利信) | 1747–1767 | Iyo-no-kami (伊予守) | Lower 5th (従五位下) | 23,000 koku |
| 2 | Doi Toshinari (土井利徳) | 1767–1787 | Yamashiro-no-kami (山城守) | Lower 5th (従五位下) | 23,000 koku |
| 3 | Doi Toshinori (土井利制) | 1787–1794 | Hyobu-no-kami (兵庫頭) | Lower 5th (従五位下) | 23,000 koku |
| 4 | Doi Toshikata (土井利謙) | 1794–1813 | Iyo-no-kami (伊予守) | Lower 5th (従五位下) | 23,000 koku |
| 5 | Doi Toshimochi (土井利以) | 1813–1829 | Awaji-no-kami (淡路守) | Lower 5th (従五位下) | 23,000 koku |
| 6 | Doi Toshiharu (土井利行) | 1830–1838 | Osumi-no-kami (大隈守) | Lower 5th (従五位下) | 23,000 koku |
| 7 | Doi Toshisuke (土井利祐) | 1838–1846 | Awaji-no-kami (淡路守) | Lower 5th (従五位下) | 23,000 koku |
| 8 | Doi Toshiyoshi (土井利善) | 1847–1866 | Osumi-no-kami (大隈守) | Lower 5th (従五位下) | 23,000 koku |
| 9 | Doi Toshinori (土井利教) | 1866-1871 | Awaji-no-kami (淡路守) | Lower 5th (従五位下) | 23,000 koku |
