= Mitsuhiro =

- Gender: Male

Origin
- Origin: Japanese
- Meaning: Different meanings depending on the kanji used

Mitsuhiro (written: 光洋, 光尋, 光弘, 光浩, 光博, 光広, 光寛, 光裕, 光宏, 光啓, 充洋 or 充弘) is a masculine Japanese given name. Notable people with the name include:

- Mitsuhiro Adachi (足立 光宏; born 1940), Japanese baseball player
- Mitsuhiro Hidaka (日高 光啓; born 1986), Japanese singer, rapper, actor and dancer
- Mitsuhiro Ichiki (市来 光弘; born 1982), Japanese voice actor
- Mitsuhiro Ishida (石田 光洋; born 1978), Japanese mixed martial artist
- Mitsuhiro Kawamoto (河本 充弘; born 1971), Japanese footballer
- Mitsuhiro Kitta (born 1942), Japanese golfer
- Mitsuhiro Mihara (三原 光尋; born 1964), Japanese film director
- Mitsuhiro Misaki (見崎 充洋; born 1970), Japanese footballer
- Mitsuhiro Miyakoshi (宮腰 光寛; born 1950), Japanese politician
- Mitsuhiro Murata (村田 光弘; born 1970), Japanese figure skater and coach
- Mitsuhiro Nakamura (中村 光宏; born 1984), Japanese announcer
- Mitsuhiro Sato (佐藤 光浩; born 1980), Japanese sprinter
- Mitsuhiro Seki (関 光博; born 1982), Japanese footballer
- Mitsuhiro Shishikura (宍倉 光広; born 1960), Japanese mathematician
- Mitsuhiro Takemura (武邑 光裕; born 1954), Japanese academic
- Mitsuhiro Toda (戸田 光洋; born 1977), Japanese footballer
- Mitsuhiro Yanagida (柳田 充弘; born 1941), Japanese biologist
- Mitsuhiro Yoshimura (born 1973), Japanese musician
