= Takemura =

Takemura (written: 竹村 or, more rarely, 武村, 竹邑 or 武邑) is a Japanese surname. Notable people with the surname include:

- Hiroshi Takemura, Japanese voice actor
- Katsushi Takemura, Japanese professional wrestler
- Kiriko Takemura, Japanese singer and model, known under the pseudonym Kyary Pamyu Pamyu
- Masayoshi Takemura, Japanese politician
- Mitsuhiro Takemura, Japanese scholar
- Nobukazu Takemura, Japanese musician
- Takemura Yoemon, Japanese swordsman
- Yoshiya Takemura, Japanese football player

== See also ==
- Takemura Station, a railway station in Toyota, Aichi Prefecture, Japan
