= Tsuchihashi =

Tsuchihashi (written: 土橋) is a Japanese surname. Notable people with the surname include:

- Masaki Tsuchihashi (土橋 正樹, born 1972), Japanese footballer
- Paul Tsuchihashi (1866–1965), Japanese lexicographer
- Toshihisa Tsuchihashi (土橋 登志久, born 1966), Japanese tennis player
- Yuitsu Tsuchihashi (土橋勇逸, 1891–1975), Japanese general

== See also ==
- Tsuchihashi Station (土橋駅, Tsuchihashi-eki), a railway station in Toyota, Aichi Prefecture, Japan
