= 2024 World Series =

Major League Baseball's championship series

Team (Wins)	Managers	Season
Los Angeles Dodgers (4)	Dave Roberts	98–64 (.605), GA: 5
New York Yankees (1)	Aaron Boone	94–68 (.580), GA: 3
- Dates: October 25–30
- Venue(s): Dodger Stadium (Los Angeles); Yankee Stadium (New York)
- MVP: Freddie Freeman (Los Angeles)
- Umpires: Mark Carlson (crew chief), Doug Eddings, Chad Fairchild, Andy Fletcher, Mark Ripperger, Todd Tichenor, Carlos Torres

Broadcast
- Television: Fox (United States – English); Fox Deportes (United States – Spanish); Univision (United States – Spanish) (Game 1); MLB International (International); Fuji TV (Japan – Japanese); NHK BS (Japan – Japanese); J Sports (Japan – Japanese); SPOTV (Japan – Japanese)
- TV announcers: Joe Davis, John Smoltz, Ken Rosenthal, and Tom Verducci (Fox); Adrián García Márquez, Edgar González, Carlos Álvarez, and Jaime Motta (Fox Deportes); Antonio de Valdés, Enrique Burak, Nelson Cruz, Daniel Nohra, and Luis Alberto Martínez (Univision); Dave Flemming and Ryan Spilborghs (MLB International – English); Mitsuhiro Nakamura (Games 1 and 5), Shinichi Tanioka (Game 2), Tatsuki Okawa (Game 3), and Yohei Takeshita (Game 4) (Fuji – Japanese); Ken Ikeno, Kensuke Tanaka, and Shigetoshi Hasegawa (Games 3-5) (NHK BS – Japanese); Munenori Kawasaki and Yoshio Itoi (SPOTV – Japanese)
- Radio: ESPN (United States – English); TUDN (United States – Spanish); KLAC, KFI (LAD – English); KTNQ (LAD – Spanish); WFAN (NYY – English); WADO (NYY – Spanish)
- Radio announcers: Jon Sciambi, Jessica Mendoza, Eduardo Pérez, and Buster Olney (ESPN); Alberto Ferreiro and Luis Quiñones (TUDN); Stephen Nelson and Rick Monday (KLAC); Pepe Yñiguez and José Mota (KTNQ); John Sterling and Suzyn Waldman (WFAN); Rickie Ricardo and Francisco Rivera (WADO)
- ALCS: New York Yankees over Cleveland Guardians (4–1)
- NLCS: Los Angeles Dodgers over New York Mets (4–2)

The 2024 World Series (branded as the 2024 World Series presented by Capital One) was the championship series of Major League Baseball's (MLB) 2024 season. The 120th edition of the World Series, it was a best-of-seven playoff between the American League (AL) champion New York Yankees and the National League (NL) champion Los Angeles Dodgers. It was the Yankees' first World Series appearance since 2009 (and 41st in franchise history) and the Dodgers' first World Series appearance since 2020 (25th overall). It was also the 12th time in the Dodgers–Yankees rivalry that the teams met in the World Series, and the first instance since 1981. The series began on October 25 and ended on October 30 with the Dodgers defeating the Yankees in five games. Freddie Freeman was named the MVP of the series, tying a World Series record with 12 runs batted in (RBIs) and hitting home runs in the first four games of the series, including Game 1 when he hit the first walk-off grand slam in World Series history.

The Yankees and Dodgers entered the 2024 MLB postseason as the top seeds in their respective leagues. The Dodgers had home-field advantage in the series due to their better regular season win-loss record. Superstar players Aaron Judge and Shohei Ohtani had also made their World Series debuts this Series. Coming into the series, the two teams had played 66 World Series games against each other all-time, the most for any two teams by far, with the Yankees having a 37–29 record over the Dodgers. The Yankees had a 6–1 World Series title edge during the Brooklyn Dodgers/Subway Series era, with the two teams tying 2–2 following the Dodgers' relocation to Los Angeles, making the overall record 8–3.

In the 2024 World Series, Freeman's Game 1 walk-off grand slam built momentum for the Dodgers to take a 3–0 series lead, following two subsequent low-scoring wins. The Yankees showed signs of struggle as a Grand Slam put them ahead in game 4 leading to the eventual win, making the series 3–1. At the time many thought this was a change in momentum. In Game 5, the Yankees quickly took a 5–0 lead heading into the 5th inning. However, Game 5 is most remembered for a series of Yankee errors and misplays that enabled the Dodgers to overcome the 5-run deficit and tie the game in the same inning. The Dodgers would eventually retake the lead and clinch the title, ending the series at 4–1 and setting the record for most runs to come from behind in a World Series-clinching game.

It was the Dodgers' eighth World Series title in franchise history following 2020. For the Yankees, it was their 14th World Series loss in franchise history, putting them in a two-way tie for most World Series losses with the Dodgers. In terms of their rivalry, the Dodgers won the series over the Yankees for the fourth time, the record standing at 4–8 following this series, holding a 3–2 edge since their relocation to Los Angeles. The Dodgers would make the World Series again the following year, winning in seven games against the Toronto Blue Jays and becoming the first back-to-back champions since the 1998-2000 Yankees.

== Background ==
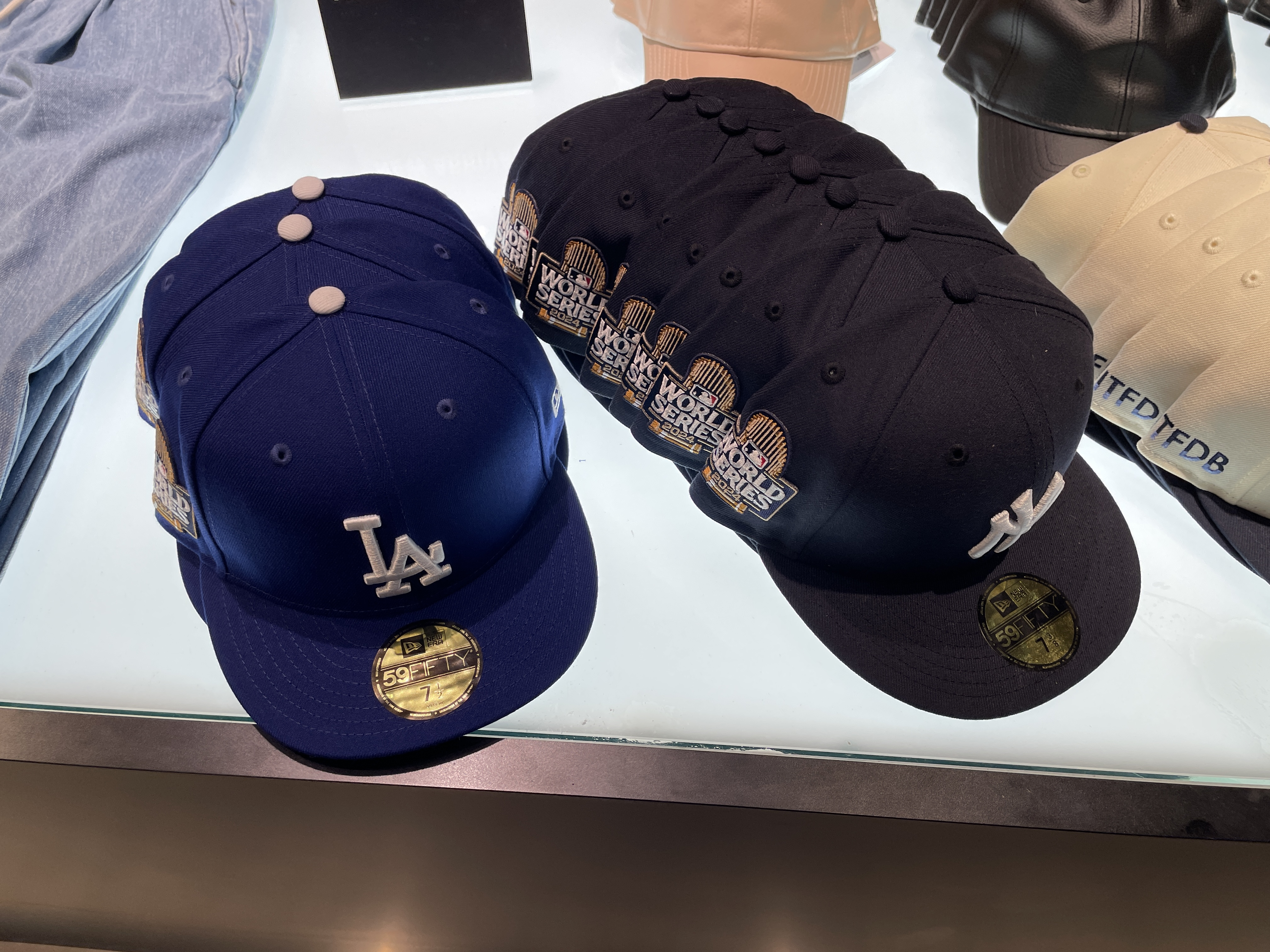
2024 World series caps

This series marked the twelfth World Series meeting between the Dodgers and Yankees and the first since 1981. This was the ninth meeting between teams from New York City and Los Angeles for a major professional sports championship. This previously happened in four World Series (1963, 1977, 1978, 1981), three NBA Finals (1970, 1972, and 1973) and the 2014 Stanley Cup Final. This was also the eighth New York–California matchup in the World Series (1962, 1963, 1973, 1977, 1978, 1981, 1998).

Additionally, this World Series was contested between the two eventual winners of the most valuable player (MVP) awards in their respective leagues: Aaron Judge of the Yankees and Shohei Ohtani of the Dodgers. This was the first World Series since 2012 (when Buster Posey of the San Francisco Giants faced Miguel Cabrera of the Detroit Tigers) to feature the two league MVPs from that season. Judge won the American League (AL) MVP Award in 2022, while Ohtani won two AL MVP awards unanimously with the Los Angeles Angels in 2021 and 2023. During the 2024 regular season, Judge hit 58 home runs while Ohtani hit 54 during his 50–50 season, meaning that this is the first time in Major League Baseball history that two batters who hit 50 home runs in the same regular season are playing against each other in the World Series. Because of the renewal of the rivalry between the two storied franchises, the low ratings of the previous World Series, just the fifth World Series since the Wild Card era began in 1995 to feature the two best teams in the league and the World Series debuts of both Ohtani and Judge, many regarded the matchup as a "dream" World Series in the lead-up to the event.

The Dodgers won a three-game series against the Yankees in June in New York, winning the first two games before dropping the finale, though Juan Soto did not appear in the series.

=== New York Yankees ===
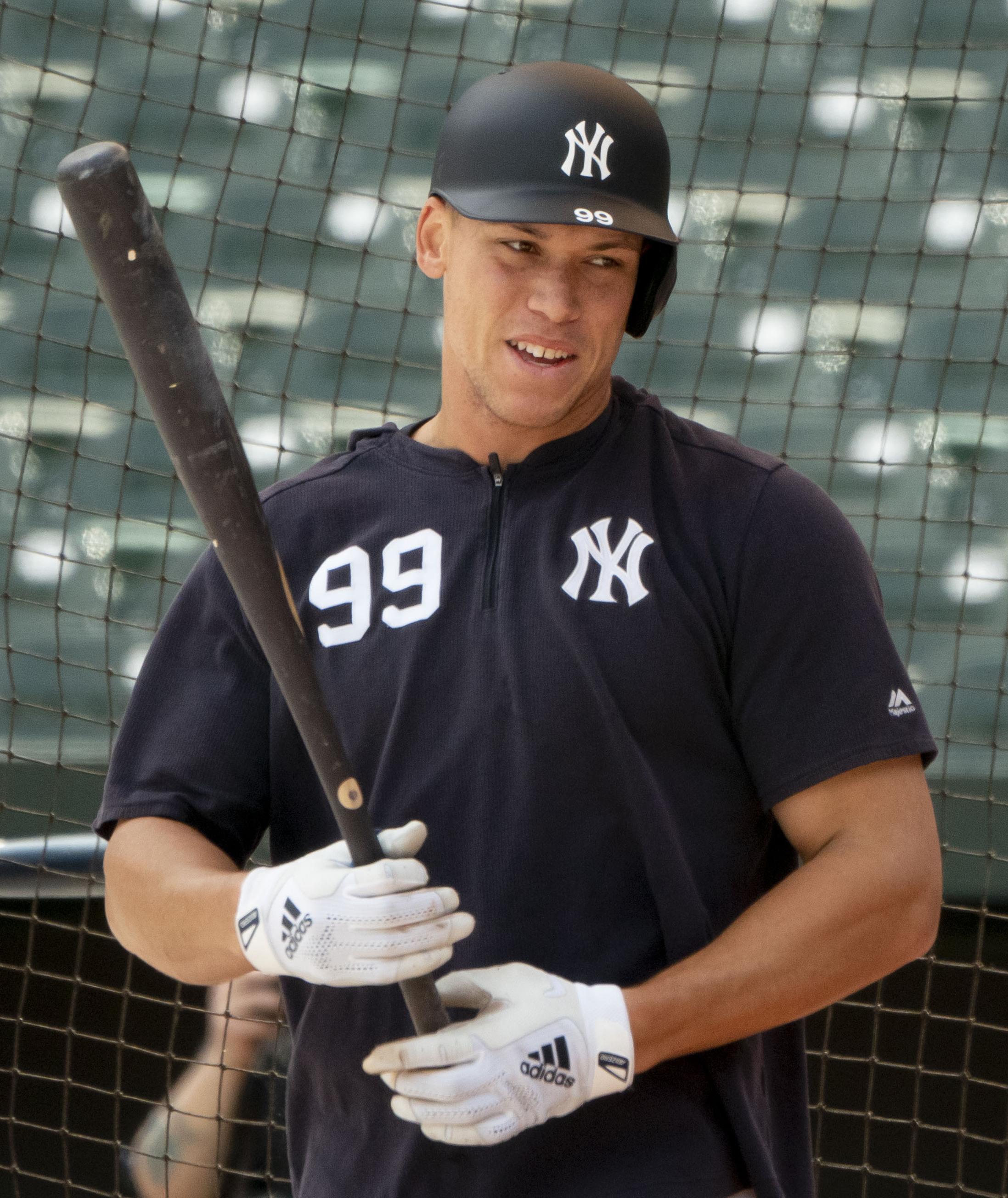
Aaron Judge led MLB in home runs for the second time in his career.

After missing the postseason in 2023, the New York Yankees traded for star outfielder Juan Soto to help bolster their lineup. The Soto and Aaron Judge led Yankees offense finished the American League first in runs and led MLB in home runs. Judge arguably had the finest season of his career, posting a 10.8 wins above replacement (this tied a career-high with his 62 home run season in 2022) and a .701 slugging percentage in 704 plate appearances. Soto, in what turned out to be his lone season with the Yankees, rebounded after a middling year and a half in San Diego, returning to superstar form by posting a 7.9 wins above replacement himself and hitting a career-high 41 home runs. Joining Soto and Judge as All-Stars was relief pitcher Clay Holmes. The Yankees' closer role initially belonged to Holmes, but after recording an MLB-leading 11 blown saves, he lost the position. Luke Weaver took over the role in September and retained it throughout their postseason run. After not appearing in a game until June 19 due a spring training injury, reigning AL Cy Young award winner Gerrit Cole headed a deep rotation of starters including Carlos Rodón, rookie Luis Gil, Nestor Cortes, Marcus Stroman, and Clarke Schmidt. At the trade deadline, the team added Jazz Chisholm Jr. and Mark Leiter Jr.

The New York Yankees qualified for the postseason as the American League East division winner and the league's first seed. In the American League Division Series, they defeated the Kansas City Royals in four games. In the American League Championship Series, they defeated the Cleveland Guardians in five games to win their 41st pennant in franchise history and return to the World Series for the first time since their championship season in 2009, putting an end to their 15-year World Series appearance drought. Giancarlo Stanton won the ALCS MVP award with four home runs and seven RBIs.

This World Series marked the debut of Aaron Judge, Stanton, and Gleyber Torres, while Gerrit Cole, Juan Soto, and Anthony Rizzo returned to the World Series for the second time in their careers. Rizzo and Soto were seeking second career World Series championship, having won with the Chicago Cubs and Washington Nationals, respectively, while Cole was seeking his first championship after the Houston Astros lost in 2019. Aaron Boone, in his seventh season as a manager for the Yankees, was seeking his first World Series win as a manager. The Yankees were looking to win their league-leading 28th World Series championship title.

=== Los Angeles Dodgers ===
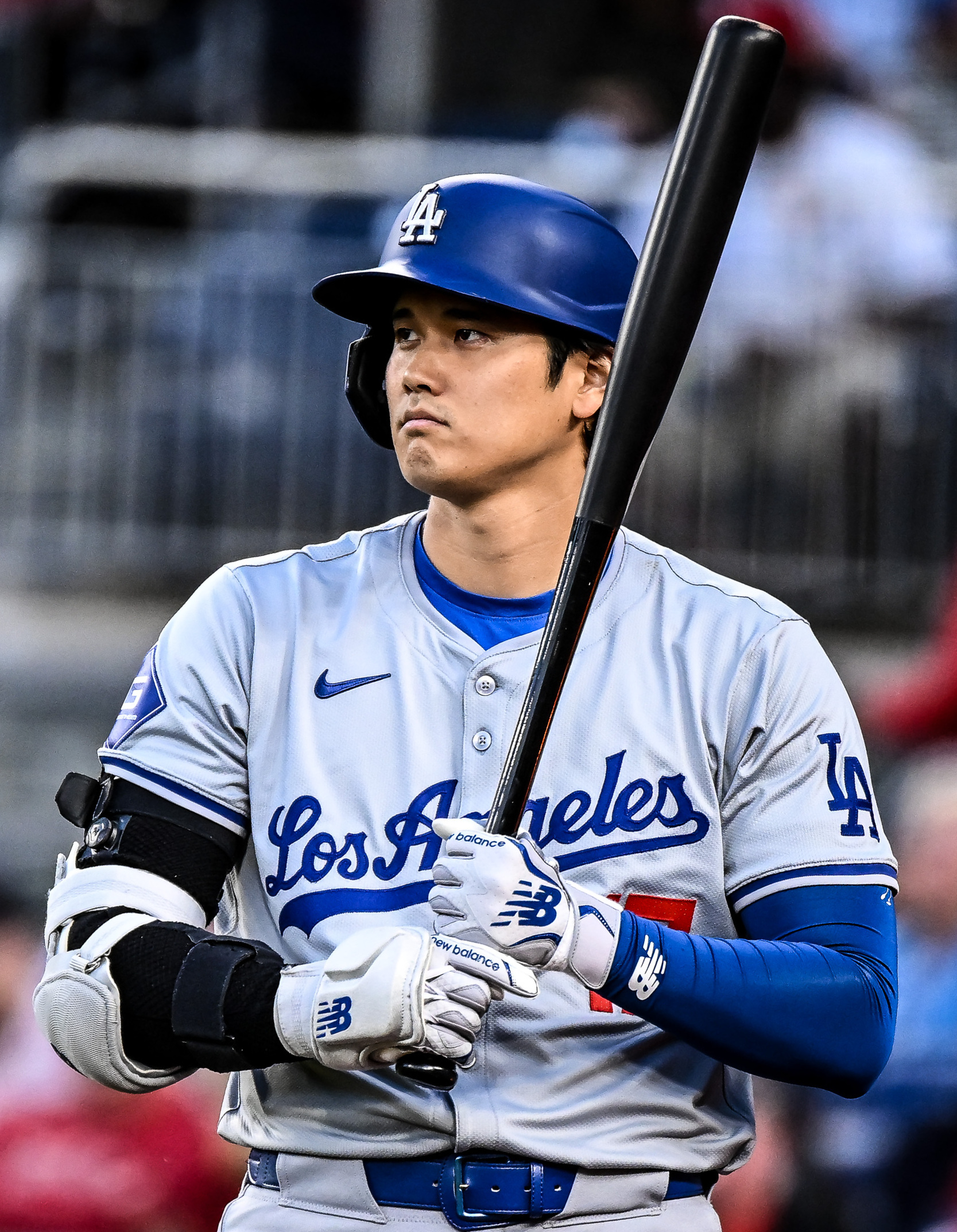
Shohei Ohtani became the first player to hit at least 50 home runs and steal 50 bases in a single season.

After back-to-back upset losses to division rivals in the postseason in 2022 and 2023, the Dodgers looked to reshape their roster. In the off-season, they signed superstar two-way player Shohei Ohtani to a record $700 million, 10 year contract. Other big additions were signing outfielder Teoscar Hernández and pitcher Yoshinobu Yamamoto (from Japan through the posting system) and trading for starting pitcher Tyler Glasnow. Despite heavy opposition from the surging Arizona Diamondbacks and San Diego Padres in their division, and various injuries, such as a season-ending injry to Glasnow in August, a two-month hand injury to Mookie Betts, and a three-month abdominal injury to Max Muncy, the Dodgers still achieved the best win-loss record in the majors and won the National League West. They qualified for the postseason for the 12th consecutive season, dating back to 2013, the third-longest streak in MLB history.

Although Ohtani could not pitch in 2024 due to elbow surgery, he was tremendously successful as a batter and baserunner. Playing at designated hitter, Ohtani became the first player in MLB history to break the 50 home runs, 50 stolen bases barrier in a single season. He also surpassed Shawn Green's Dodgers single-season home run record with 54 home runs. At the All-Star Game, the Dodgers sent six players—Ohtani, Betts, Hernández, Glasnow, Freddie Freeman, and Will Smith. At the trade deadline, the Dodgers added starting pitcher Jack Flaherty, set-up reliever Michael Kopech, and utility player Tommy Edman; Edman would win the NLCS MVP Award after recording 11 runs batted in (RBIs) in the series.

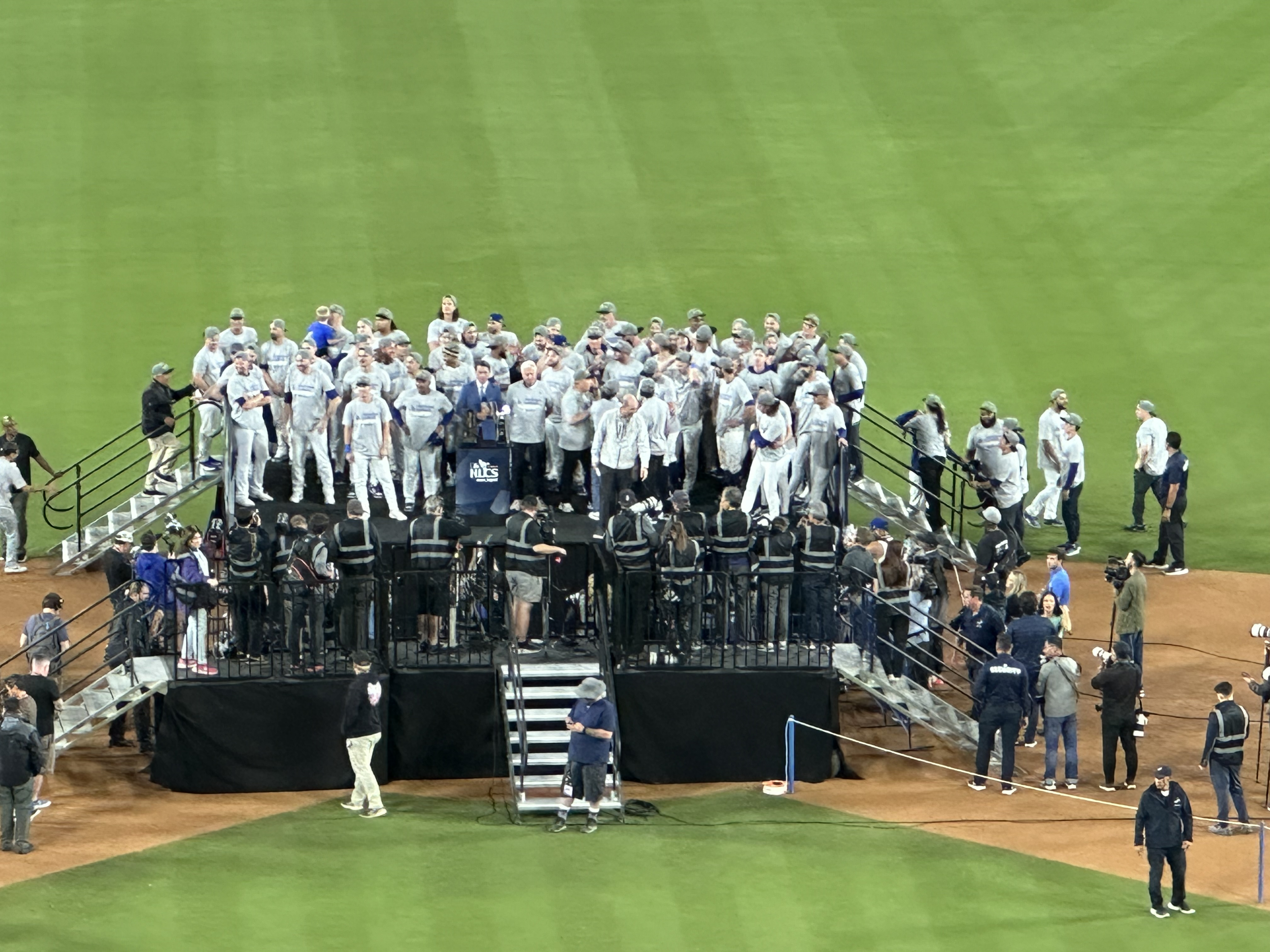
The Dodgers receive the Warren C. Giles Trophy after defeating the Mets in the NLCS

In the National League Division Series, the Dodgers faced a 2–1 deficit to their division rival San Diego Padres before rallying to take the series in five games. In the National League Championship Series, they defeated the New York Mets in six games to win their 25th pennant in franchise history and return to the World Series for the first time since their championship season in 2020, and the fourth time in eight years (2017–2018, 2020, and 2024). The Dodgers were just the second team in MLB history to face the two New York baseball teams in a single postseason, following the 1999 Braves. The Dodgers were looking to win their eighth World Series title.

For the Dodgers, 2024 marked the World Series debuts of Ohtani, Yamamoto, T. Hernández, and Edman. Freddie Freeman and Will Smith made their second World Series appearances. Max Muncy, Mookie Betts, and Walker Buehler made their third World Series appearances. Freeman, Smith, Muncy, and Buehler were seeking their second World Series championships, with the former having won with the Braves in 2021 and the latter two having won with the Dodgers in 2020, while Betts was seeking his third World Series championship and the second with the Dodgers, having won with the Red Sox in 2018 and with the Dodgers in 2020. Dave Roberts, in his ninth year as a manager for the Dodgers, was seeking his second World Series championship as a manager, and third overall.

The Dodgers also announced plans to use the World Series games at Dodger Stadium to pay tribute to former pitcher Fernando Valenzuela, who died shortly before the 2024 World Series and who was vital to the team's 1981 championship season.

== Summary ==
Los Angeles won the series, 4–1.

Game	Date	Score	Location	Time	Attendance
1	October 25	New York Yankees – 3, Los Angeles Dodgers – 6 (10)	Dodger Stadium	3:27	52,394
2	October 26	New York Yankees – 2, Los Angeles Dodgers – 4	Dodger Stadium	2:53	52,725
3	October 28	Los Angeles Dodgers – 4, New York Yankees – 2	Yankee Stadium	3:25	49,368
4	October 29	Los Angeles Dodgers – 4, New York Yankees – 11	Yankee Stadium	3:16	49,354
5	October 30	Los Angeles Dodgers – 7, New York Yankees – 6	Yankee Stadium	3:42	49,263

== Matchups ==
=== Game 1 ===
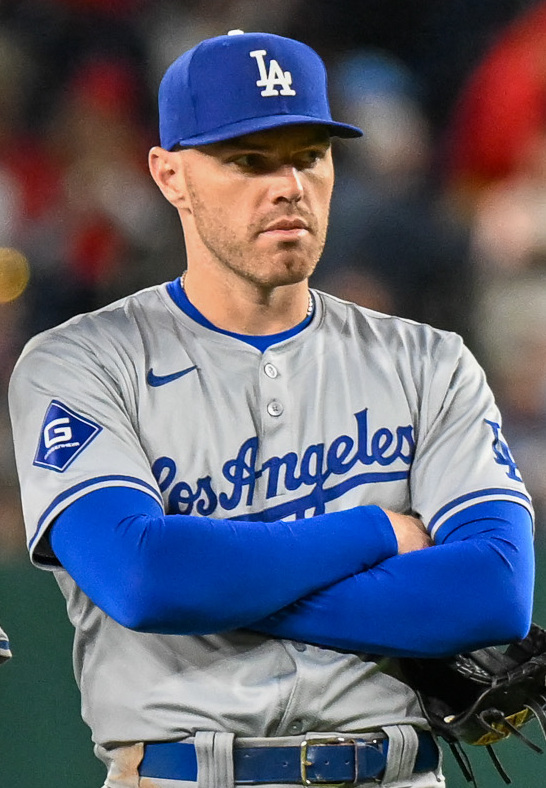
In Game 1, Freddie Freeman hit a walk-off grand slam, the second walk-off grand slam in MLB postseason history.

October 25, 2024 5:11 pm (PDT) at Dodger Stadium in Los Angeles, California 76 °F (24 °C), Clear
Team	1	2	3	4	5	6	7	8	9	10	R	H	E
New York	0	0	0	0	0	2	0	0	0	1	3	10	1
Los Angeles	0	0	0	0	1	0	0	1	0	4	6	7	1
WP: Blake Treinen (1–0) LP: Jake Cousins (0–1); Home runs: NYY: Giancarlo Stanton (1); LAD: Freddie Freeman (1); Attendance: 52,394; Boxscore

External videos
- Game 1 full replay on the MLB's official YouTube channel

Game 1 featured starting pitchers Jack Flaherty for the Dodgers and Gerrit Cole for the Yankees. Country singer Brad Paisley performed "The Star-Spangled Banner". In tribute to Fernando Valenzuela, his former Dodger teammates Orel Hershiser and Steve Yeager placed a ball on the blue No. 34 painted on the pitcher's mound instead of throwing out a ceremonial first pitch.

The two starters, Flaherty and Cole, kept the game scoreless through the first four innings. After Enrique Hernández hit a triple in the bottom of the fifth inning, he scored the game's first run via a sacrifice fly by Will Smith. In the top of the sixth, Giancarlo Stanton hit a two-run home run after a Juan Soto single, giving the Yankees a 2–1 lead and knocking Flaherty out of the game. Cole was removed from the game after giving up a leadoff single to Teoscar Hernández in the seventh. In the bottom of the eighth, Shohei Ohtani hit a ball off the top of the outfield wall and reached second base, but Juan Soto's throw got away from second baseman Gleyber Torres, and Ohtani advanced to third base. The next batter, Mookie Betts, hit a sacrifice fly to score Ohtani and tie the game.

In the top of the ninth, Michael Kopech was sent in by Roberts to close out the ninth inning. He got the first two batters he faced to ground out but then gave up a hit to Torres that was caught at the wall by a fan. Instead of a home run, he was awarded second base on a fan interference call, and the game remained tied at 2–2. After a review, the call was upheld. After intentionally walking Juan Soto, Kopech was removed from the game and replaced by Blake Treinen, who got Aaron Judge to pop out, ending the inning. Yankees closer Luke Weaver pitched a perfect inning in the bottom of the ninth, sending the game into extra innings. In the top of the tenth, Treinen gave up a one-out single to Jazz Chisholm Jr. who then stole second base. Anthony Rizzo was intentionally walked, and Chisholm Jr. stole third. The next batter, Anthony Volpe, hit an RBI force-out that was bobbled by Tommy Edman, allowing Chisholm Jr. to score the go-ahead run, giving the Yankees a 3–2 lead.

With the Yankees leading by a run, reliever Jake Cousins was sent in to pitch the last three outs. He got Smith to fly out, then walked Gavin Lux. Edman followed with an infield single to put runners on first and second with one out. Cousins was then removed from the game and replaced with Nestor Cortés Jr., who hadn't pitched since September 18. Cortés Jr. first faced Ohtani, who hit a ball into foul territory that was caught by a leaping Alex Verdugo, who toppled into the front row of the stands. Because Verdugo went out of play with the ball, the runners were awarded one base, advancing them to second and third. With the Dodgers down to their final out, the Yankees intentionally walked Betts, thus loading the bases and bringing Freddie Freeman to the plate. On the first pitch, Freeman hit a walk-off grand slam over the right field wall, winning Game 1 for Los Angeles. This was the third consecutive World Series Game 1 to be decided in extra innings, after it previously occurred in 2022 and 2023.

Freeman's home run was the first walk-off grand slam in World Series history as well as the third Series walk-off home run of any kind for a team that was trailing, following Joe Carter's World Series-winning home run for the Toronto Blue Jays in 1993 and Kirk Gibson's Game 1-winning home run for the Dodgers in 1988. In particular, Freeman's home run was widely compared to Gibson's off the Athletics' Dennis Eckersley, as both players were playing through injuries at the time and the Dodgers were down by a run and down to their last out in Game 1 of the World Series. Fox broadcaster Joe Davis' call of "...she is gone!" echoed that of legendary Dodgers and then-NBC broadcaster Vin Scully for Gibson's home run, as well; and Davis also added, "Gibby, meet Freddie!". After his colleague Smoltz expressed his disbelief over the final at-bat, Davis also referenced Jack Buck's well-known call of the Gibson home run by asking Smoltz, "Would you say you don't believe what you just saw?".

Game 1 has been widely referred to as one of the greatest World Series games of all time.

=== Game 2 ===
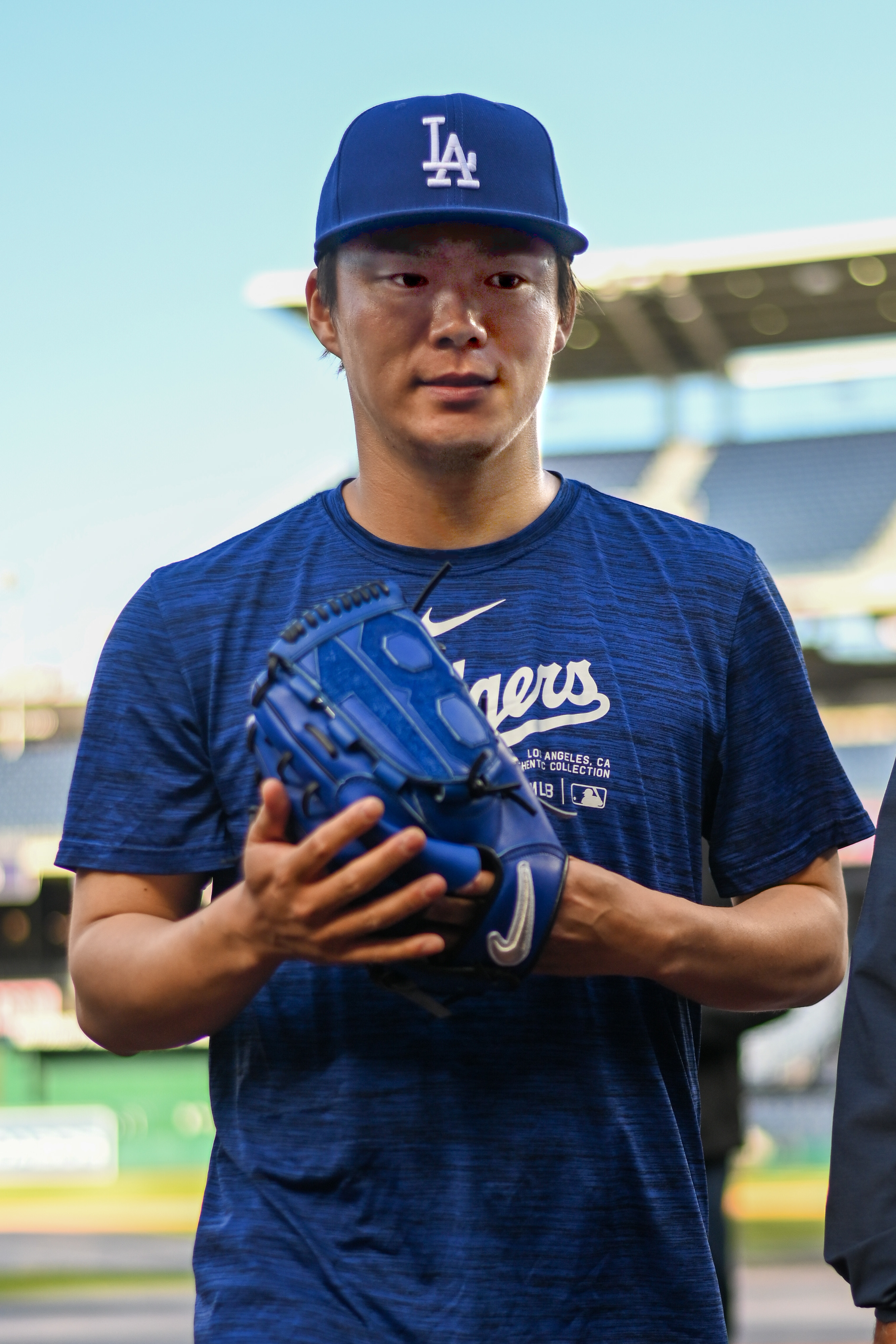
Yoshinobu Yamamoto gave up only one hit through six innings in his World Series debut

October 26, 2024 5:15 pm (PDT) at Dodger Stadium in Los Angeles, California 77 °F (25 °C), Partly Cloudy
Team	1	2	3	4	5	6	7	8	9	R	H	E
New York	0	0	1	0	0	0	0	0	1	2	4	0
Los Angeles	0	1	3	0	0	0	0	0	X	4	8	0
WP: Yoshinobu Yamamoto (1–0) LP: Carlos Rodón (0–1) Sv: Alex Vesia (1); Home runs: NYY: Juan Soto (1); LAD: Tommy Edman (1), Teoscar Hernández (1), Freddie Freeman (2); Attendance: 52,725; Boxscore

American rapper and Los Angeles native Ice Cube performed "Bow Down" and "It Was a Good Day" before Game 2. Pearle Peterson, a 19-year-old, sang the national anthem, accompanied by organist Dieter Ruehle. Game 2 featured starting pitchers Yoshinobu Yamamoto for the Dodgers and Carlos Rodón for the Yankees. Matt Kemp and Andre Ethier threw out the ceremonial first pitch.

In the bottom of the second inning, Tommy Edman hit a solo home run off Rodón as the Dodgers took a 1–0 lead. Juan Soto hit a solo home run off Yamamoto in the top of the third inning to tie the game. In the bottom of the inning, Mookie Betts hit a single followed by a Teoscar Hernández two-run home run and a solo home run by Freddie Freeman to give the Dodgers a 4–1 lead. Yamamoto allowed only one hit in 6 1/3 innings in his start. In the bottom of the seventh inning with two outs, Shohei Ohtani had a left shoulder subluxation when he slid in his steal attempt at second base, as he was caught stealing to end the seventh inning; he lay at second base in pain until his trainer tended him to leave the field. With the Dodgers leading by three runs, Blake Treinen was sent in to close out the game in the top of the ninth. He gave up a leadoff single to Soto, who advanced to second on a wild pitch. After Aaron Judge struck out, Giancarlo Stanton hit a ground ball that bounced off the third base bag and into the outfield, scoring Soto. The Yankees then loaded the bases with an Anthony Rizzo hit-by-pitch and Jazz Chisholm Jr. single, but Volpe struck out for the second out. After the Volpe at-bat, Treinen was replaced with Alex Vesia, who got pinch-hitter Jose Trevino to fly out on the first pitch, ending the game and giving Los Angeles a 2–0 series lead.

=== Game 3 ===
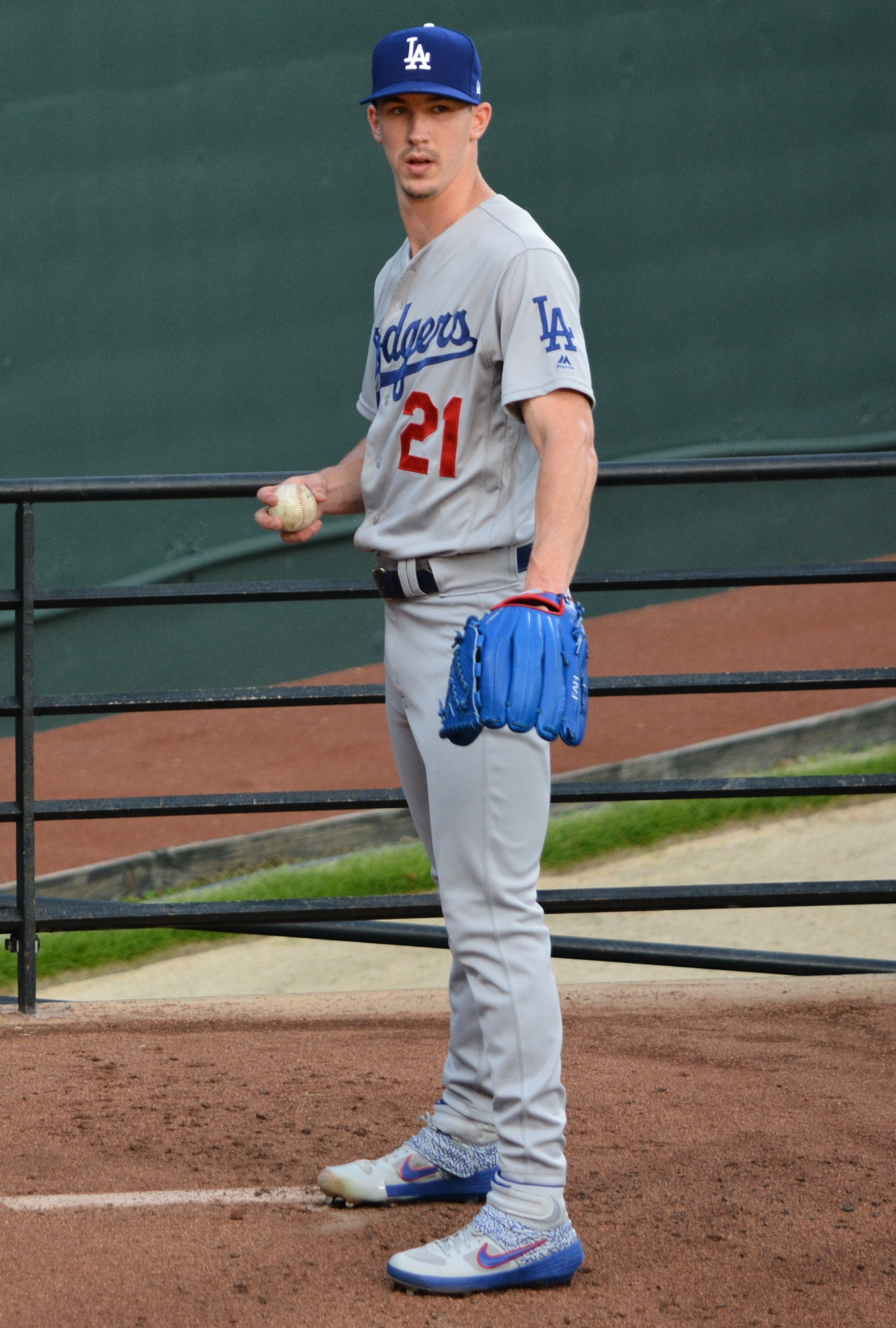
Walker Buehler pitched five scoreless innings in Game 3.

October 28, 2024 8:17 pm (EDT) at Yankee Stadium in The Bronx, New York 52 °F (11 °C), Clear
Team	1	2	3	4	5	6	7	8	9	R	H	E
Los Angeles	2	0	1	0	0	1	0	0	0	4	5	0
New York	0	0	0	0	0	0	0	0	2	2	5	1
WP: Walker Buehler (1–0) LP: Clarke Schmidt (0–1); Home runs: LAD: Freddie Freeman (3); NYY: Alex Verdugo (1); Attendance: 49,368; Boxscore

Fat Joe performed "New York" and "All the Way Up" prior to Game 3. Joe's performance was mostly panned by fans on social media. New York native Leslie Odom Jr. sang the national anthem and Derek Jeter threw the ceremonial first pitch. Aaron Tveit sang "God Bless America" during the seventh inning stretch. Clarke Schmidt was the starting pitcher for the Yankees and Walker Buehler for the Dodgers.

In the top of the first inning, after Shohei Ohtani's leadoff walk, Freddie Freeman hit a two-run home run, tying a record by homering in his fifth straight World Series game going back to the 2021 World Series, where he appeared as a member of the Atlanta Braves. In the top of the third inning, Tommy Edman led off with a walk, advanced on a groundout and then scored on a single by Mookie Betts. The Dodgers threatened again in the fourth with runners at first and third and no outs, but the rally was thwarted when Gavin Lux was tagged out on a close play at home on an attempted squeeze bunt by Edman. In the bottom half of the inning, Giancarlo Stanton doubled and tried to score on Anthony Volpe's single, but he was also cut down at the plate via an accurate throw by left fielder Teoscar Hernandez to keep the Yankees off the board.

The Dodgers added another run in the sixth inning when Gavin Lux was hit by a Jake Cousins pitch, stole second base, and scored on a single by Enrique Hernández. The Yankees left five runners on base over the next three innings before Alex Verdugo followed an Anthony Rizzo single with a two-out, two-run home run in the bottom of the ninth to cut the Los Angeles lead in half at 4–2. However, the next batter, Gleyber Torres, grounded out to end the game and give the Dodgers a 3–0 series lead. Buehler pitched five scoreless innings in the game for the Dodgers to receive the win.

=== Game 4 ===
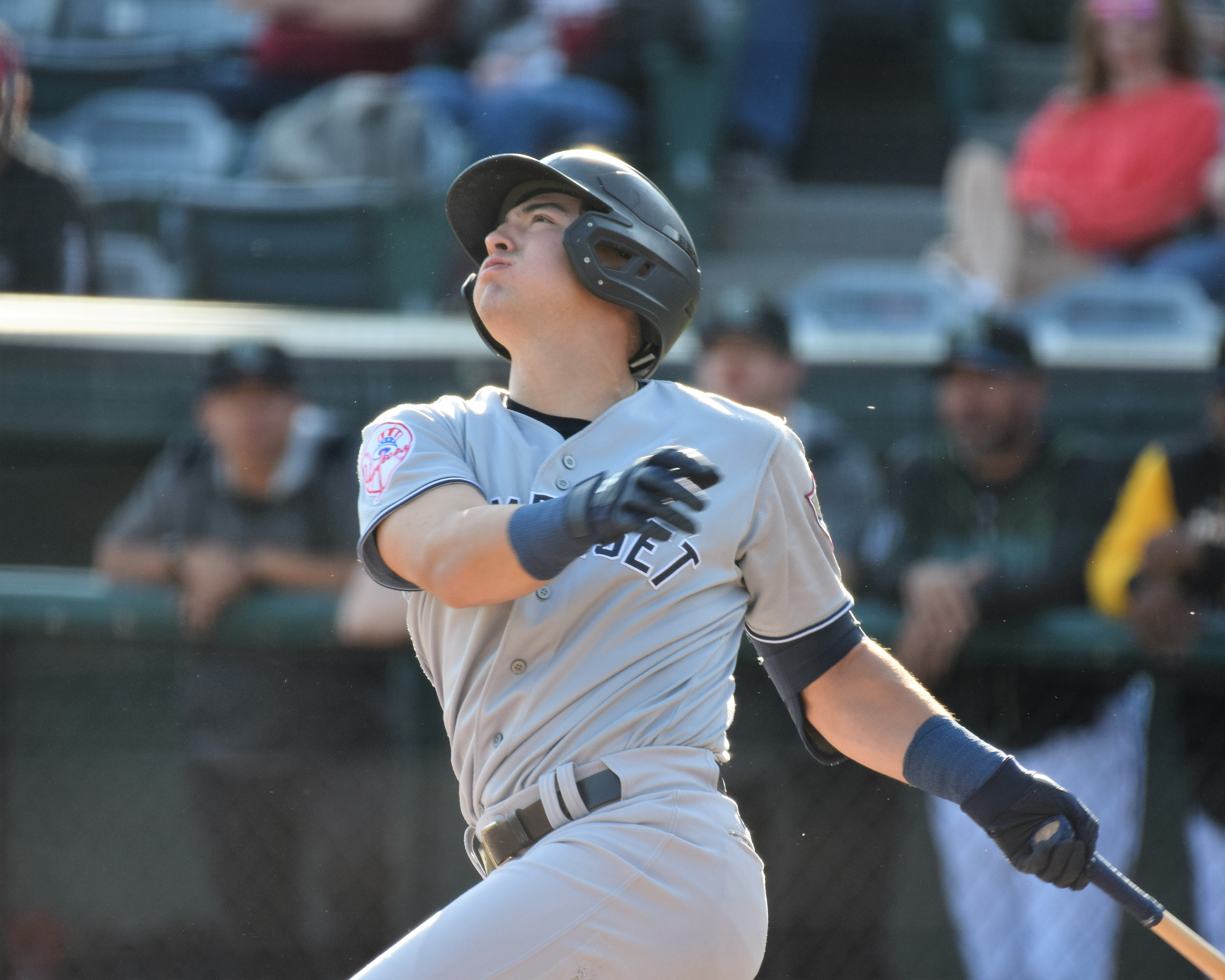
Anthony Volpe hit a grand slam and stole two bases in Game 4, the first time in World Series history the feat was accomplished.

October 29, 2024 8:08 pm (EDT) at Yankee Stadium in The Bronx, New York 61 °F (16 °C), Cloudy
Team	1	2	3	4	5	6	7	8	9	R	H	E
Los Angeles	2	0	0	0	2	0	0	0	0	4	6	1
New York	0	1	4	0	0	1	0	5	X	11	9	0
WP: Clay Holmes (1–0) LP: Daniel Hudson (0–1); Home runs: LAD: Freddie Freeman (4), Will Smith (1); NYY: Anthony Volpe (1), Austin Wells (1), Gleyber Torres (1); Attendance: 49,354; Boxscore

R&B singer and New York native Ashanti performed the national anthem before Game 4 and Paul O'Neill threw the ceremonial first pitch to A. J. Burnett. Shoshana Bean sang "God Bless America" during the seventh inning stretch. Luis Gil was the starting pitcher in Game 4 for the Yankees. The Dodgers employed a bullpen game with Ben Casparius as the opener.

In the top of the first inning, Freddie Freeman hit a two-run home run, breaking the record he had tied in the previous game with the sixth consecutive World Series game he had homered in. In the bottom of the first inning, Gleyber Torres flied out to right fielder Mookie Betts in foul territory for the first out of the inning. As he leapt to make the catch against the wall, Betts was accosted by two Yankees fans who attempted to strip the ball from his glove. The fans were ejected from the stadium and banned indefinitely from all MLB stadiums. The Yankees scored a run in the bottom of the second inning after Anthony Volpe drew a walk, Austin Wells hit a double, and Alex Verdugo hit an RBI groundout. In the bottom of the third inning, Volpe hit a two-out grand slam off of Daniel Hudson to give the Yankees a 5–2 lead. Will Smith hit a home run for the Dodgers in the fifth inning to cut the lead to two runs. Later that inning, Tommy Edman scored when Freeman beat out a fielder's choice to first base after the Dodgers won a review challenge on what had originally been called an inning-ending double play. Wells hit a solo home run for the Yankees in the sixth inning to increase the lead to two. The Yankees scored five more runs in the bottom of the eighth inning off Dodger reliever Brent Honeywell Jr. on an RBI fielder's choice by Verdugo, a three-run home run by Gleyber Torres, and an RBI single by Aaron Judge, extending the lead to 11–4. Tim Mayza closed out Game 4 to make the Yankees the first team since the Cincinnati Reds in 1970 to force a fifth game and avoid being swept after having lost the first three games in a World Series.

=== Game 5 ===
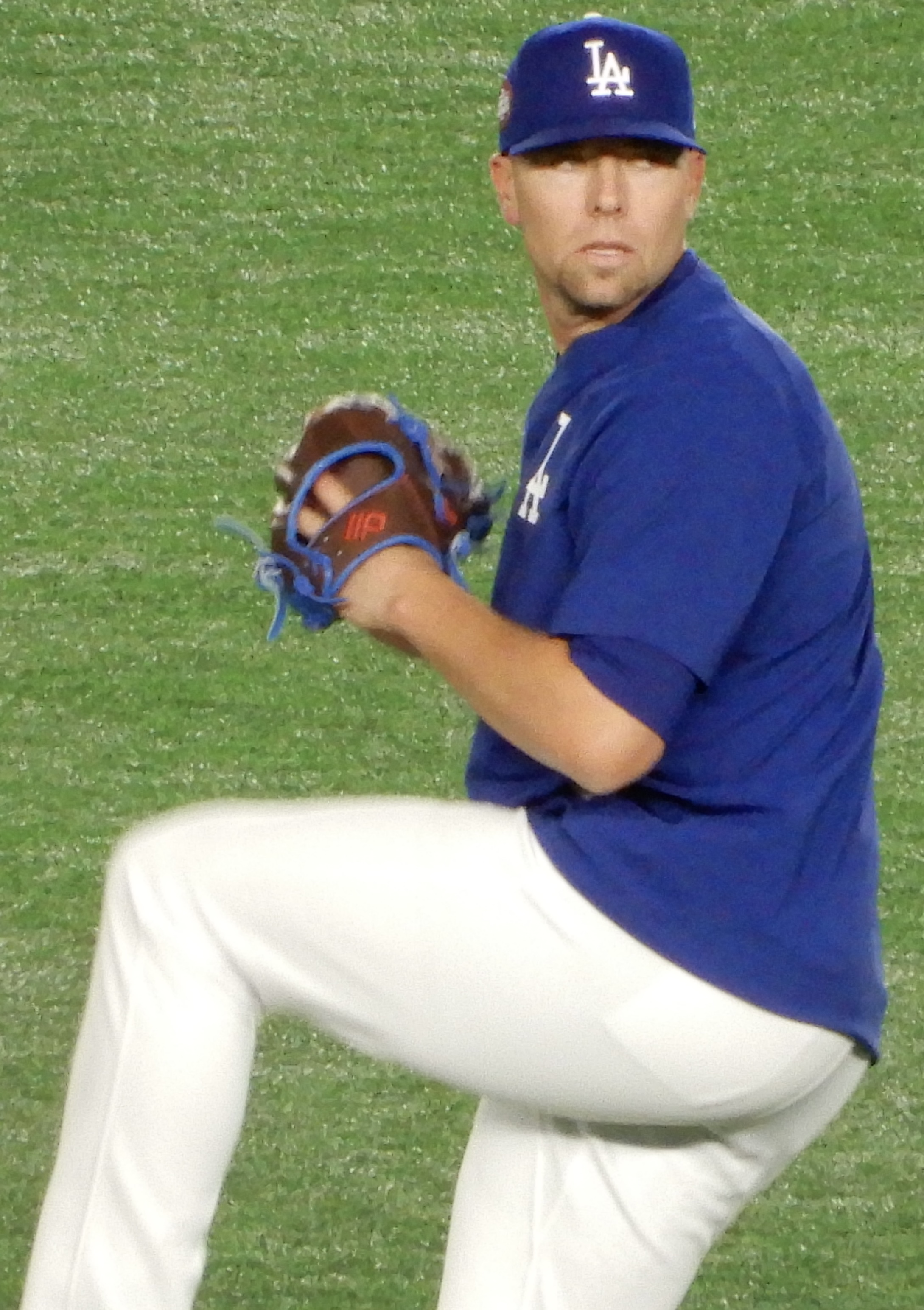
Game 5's winning pitcher Blake Treinen pitched 2 1/3 innings of relief, the most innings he had pitched in a game since 2018.

October 30, 2024 8:08 pm (EDT) at Yankee Stadium in The Bronx, New York 67 °F (19 °C), Partly Cloudy
Team	1	2	3	4	5	6	7	8	9	R	H	E
Los Angeles	0	0	0	0	5	0	0	2	0	7	7	0
New York	3	1	1	0	0	1	0	0	0	6	8	3
WP: Blake Treinen (2–0) LP: Tommy Kahnle (0–1) Sv: Walker Buehler (1); Home runs: LAD: None; NYY: Aaron Judge (1), Jazz Chisholm Jr. (1), Giancarlo Stanton (2); Attendance: 49,263; Boxscore

R&B singer Babyface sang the national anthem before Game 5 and Hideki Matsui threw the ceremonial first pitch to Jose Trevino. Kelli O'Hara sang "God Bless America" during the seventh inning stretch. The game featured a pitching rematch of Game 1 between Gerrit Cole for the Yankees and Jack Flaherty for the Dodgers.

After being limited by Flaherty in Game 1, the Yankees' offense started very quickly in Game 5, scoring the first runs for the first time in the series. In the bottom of the first inning, Juan Soto drew a walk, which was followed by a first-pitch two-run home run by Aaron Judge and a solo home run by Jazz Chisholm Jr. to give the Yankees an early 3–0 advantage. In the bottom of the second, Anthony Volpe hit a double and scored on an RBI single by Alex Verdugo, extending the Yankees' lead to 4–0, and chasing Flaherty from the game after just four outs. Giancarlo Stanton led off the third inning with a first-pitch solo home run off Ryan Brasier, pushing the Yankees' lead to 5–0. Through four innings, Cole held the Dodgers hitless and allowed just two walks.

In the fifth, the Yankees committed a series of errors and defensive mistakes that allowed the Dodgers to tie the score. After a leadoff single by Kiké Hernandez, Judge committed his first error of the season, dropping a routine fly ball off the bat of Tommy Edman that put runners on first and second. Anthony Volpe then committed a throwing error while trying to throw out Hernandez at third on Will Smith's ground ball, which loaded the bases with no outs. Cole responded by striking out Gavin Lux and Shohei Ohtani, but a slow ground ball from Mookie Betts resulted in an RBI infield single when first baseman Anthony Rizzo did not charge the bag after fielding the ball and Cole did not cover first base; had this play been made, the inning would have ended with no runs scored. With the Dodgers' deficit now 5–1 and the bases still loaded, Freddie Freeman then hit a two-run single and Teoscar Hernández a two-run double, tying the game at 5–5, with all five runs unearned.

The Yankees continued to put traffic on, forcing the Dodgers to burn through relievers. In the bottom of the fifth, Alex Vesia escaped a two-out bases-loaded jam to keep the game tied at 5–5. In the bottom of the sixth, Brusdar Graterol allowed the first two Yankees to reach on walks, with the lead runner Soto scoring two batters later on a Stanton sacrifice fly to give the Yankees the lead again at 6–5. Blake Treinen, the Dodgers' closer, entered to record the final out of the sixth and retire the side in the seventh. On the other side, Cole remained in for the Yankees for another 1 2/3 innings to help the Yankees reach the eighth inning with the lead.

In the top of the eighth, the Yankees sent in reliever Tommy Kahnle, who had not allowed an earned run in eight postseason games. Hernandez once again led off with a single, Edman followed with a broken-bat infield single, and Will Smith followed with a four-pitch walk. With the bases loaded, Kahnle was relieved by Luke Weaver, pitching in his third straight game. Weaver allowed a Gavin Lux sacrifice fly that scored Hernández, tying the game at 6–6, which moved Edman to third. Shohei Ohtani next reached on a catcher's interference, once again loading the bases. On the first pitch of his at-bat, Betts hit a sacrifice fly to score Edman, giving the Dodgers a 7–6 lead.

In the bottom of the inning, Treinen allowed a one-out double to Judge and a walk, but induced a flyout to Stanton and struck out Rizzo to complete 2 1/3 scoreless innings of relief in his longest outing of the season. With the Dodgers still maintaining a one-run lead heading into the bottom of the ninth, and with very few remaining bullpen options available, Dave Roberts called on Game 3 starter Walker Buehler to close out the game and season. Buehler, on one day's rest, pitched a perfect ninth inning, striking out Austin Wells and Alex Verdugo for the final two outs and clinching the title for Los Angeles. The Dodgers set the record for most runs to come from behind from in a clinching game.

The World Series MVP Award went to Freeman, the first player to homer in the first four games and hit a walk-off grand slam in the World Series. His 12 RBIs tied the World Series record set in 1960 by Bobby Richardson. Freeman became the 12th player to win regular season MVP and World Series MVP in a career, having previously won a regular season MVP in 2020.

With the win, the Dodgers won their eighth World Series championship in franchise history, tying their longtime rivals the San Francisco Giants for the second-most among National League clubs and the fifth-most overall. The Dodgers joined their 2020 team, the 2018 Red Sox, 2016 Cubs, 2013 Red Sox, 2009 Yankees, 2007 Red Sox, and 1998 Yankees as teams to win a World Series after having the best regular-season record in MLB in the wild card era.

=== Composite line score ===
2024 World Series (4–1): Los Angeles Dodgers beat New York Yankees.

Team	1	2	3	4	5	6	7	8	9	10	R	H	E
New York Yankees	3	2	6	0	0	4	0	5	3	1	24	36	5
Los Angeles Dodgers	4	1	4	0	8	1	0	3	0	4	25	33	2
Home runs: NYY: Giancarlo Stanton (2), Jazz Chisholm Jr. (1), Aaron Judge (1), Juan Soto (1), Gleyber Torres (1), Alex Verdugo (1), Anthony Volpe (1), Austin Wells (1); LAD: Freddie Freeman (4), Tommy Edman (1), Teoscar Hernández (1), Will Smith (1); Total attendance: 253,104 Average attendance: 50,620; Winning player's share: $477,441 Losing player's share: $354,572

== Broadcasting ==
=== Television ===
For the 25th consecutive year, the World Series was televised in the United States by Fox. Play-by-play announcer Joe Davis (who was the Dodgers' lead television announcer on Spectrum SportsNet LA during the regular season) called the games, along with Baseball Hall of Famer John Smoltz as color analyst and Ken Rosenthal and Tom Verducci as field reporters. Kevin Burkhardt hosted the pregame and postgame shows, joined by analysts Derek Jeter, Alex Rodriguez, and David Ortiz. Fox Deportes aired the Spanish-language telecasts, with play-by-play announcer Adrian Garcia Marquez, analyst Edgar Gonzalez, and reporters Carlos Alvarez and Jaime Motta.

MLB International provided television coverage outside of the United States, using feeds remotely produced by MLB Network. Dave Flemming (play-by-play) and Ryan Spilborghs (color commentator) were the English-language commentators. Univision aired Game 1 in Spanish for its first World Series telecast, after its sister network UniMás carried both the ALDS and ALCS in their entirety.

==== Fuji TV's punishment ====
The 2024 World Series is the only World Series that was televised by Fuji TV in Japan, with Fuji commentators Mitsuhiro Nakamura hosting Games 1 and 5, Shinichi Tanioka hosting Game 2, Tatsuki Okawa hosting Game 3, and Yohei Takeshita hosting Game 4. Ken Ikeno and Kensuke Tanaka commentated all five NHK coverages, with Shigetoshi Hasegawa joining in the last three games.

Following the country's successful coverage of the series, Fuji TV immediately faced consequences for conflicting with the Nippon Professional Baseball Organization during that year's Japan Series, which aired on other major Japanese networks, because of the World Series being played around the same time as the Japan Series. Because of Fuji TV's anti-monopoly law violation by unjustly interfering with its transaction with Major League Baseball, both the Nippon Professional Baseball Organization and the Fair Trade Commission canceled Fuji TV's press credentials for the Japan Series, and the network was immediately banned from covering the Japan Series as a "punishment".

Fuji Television President Koichi Minato released in a statement following its termination, that the evening digest broadcast was for viewers who were unable to watch the morning live broadcast of the World Series, while NPB Secretary General Atsushi Ihara criticized it as undermining the four-way cooperative relationship between television stations, sponsoring companies, all NPB teams and its organization, while NPB confiscated that the Japan Series press credentials from Fuji and further refused to issue press credentials to the network, saying that "the relationship of trust is damaged".

==== Ratings ====
Fox announced that the World Series delivered a combined average domestic viewership (on Fox, Fox Deportes, and streaming) of 15.8 million, a 67% increase from the previous year. The figures included a 53 share in Los Angeles, a 41 share in New York, and a 41 share in San Diego. The 2024 World Series was the most watched World Series since 2017.

Through the first two games, Japan, which aired the series on four networks (Fuji TV, NHK BS, J Sports, and SPOTV), averaged about 15 million viewers per game (with Game 2 averaging the most with 15.33 million viewers), exceeding the United States. Game 1 averaged 8.246 million Fuji viewers and 5.691 million NHK viewers, and Game 2 averaged 9.291 million Fuji viewers and 6.039 million NHK viewers. Interest was driven by Ohtani, who won his first World Series in his first MLB playoff appearance after six playoff-less seasons with the Los Angeles Angels. Japanese ratings fell during Games 3-5, with Game 3 averaging 5.226 million Fuji viewers and 4.762 million NHK viewers, and Games 4 and 5 averaging 5.575 million Fuji viewers and 4.297 million NHK viewers, but the World Series still drew an average of 12.9 million Japanese viewers.

The U.S. viewership numbers in the game-by-game table below do not include Fox Deportes.

Game	Ratings (households)	U.S. English audience (in millions)	U.S. Spanish audience (in millions)	Japan television audience (in millions)	Ref
1	6.62	14.163	1.290	13.937	
2	6.16	13.713	.385	15.330	
3	6.58	13.208	.429	9.988	
4	8.18	16.275	.419	9.872	
5	9.02	18.152	.447	9.872	

=== Radio ===
For the 27th consecutive year, ESPN Radio broadcast the series in the United States. Jon Sciambi did play-by-play, while Jessica Mendoza (who was part of the Dodgers' television crew on Spectrum SportsNet LA during the regular season) and Eduardo Pérez provided color commentary and Buster Olney reported from the field. TUDN Radio broadcast the series in Spanish.

The flagship radio stations for both teams also produced local broadcasts of each game. In Los Angeles, KLAC and KTNQ broadcast in English and Spanish respectively, while in New York, WFAN (in English) and WADO (in Spanish) aired the games. The series marked the last broadcasts for longtime Yankees radio play-by-play announcer John Sterling of WFAN, as he had announced his retirement in April 2024.

== Sponsorship ==
The 2024 World Series was sponsored by Capital One, as part of a five-year, reported $125 million deal that included advertising in the stadium and commercials during Fox's telecasts of the games.

== Series overview and aftermath ==
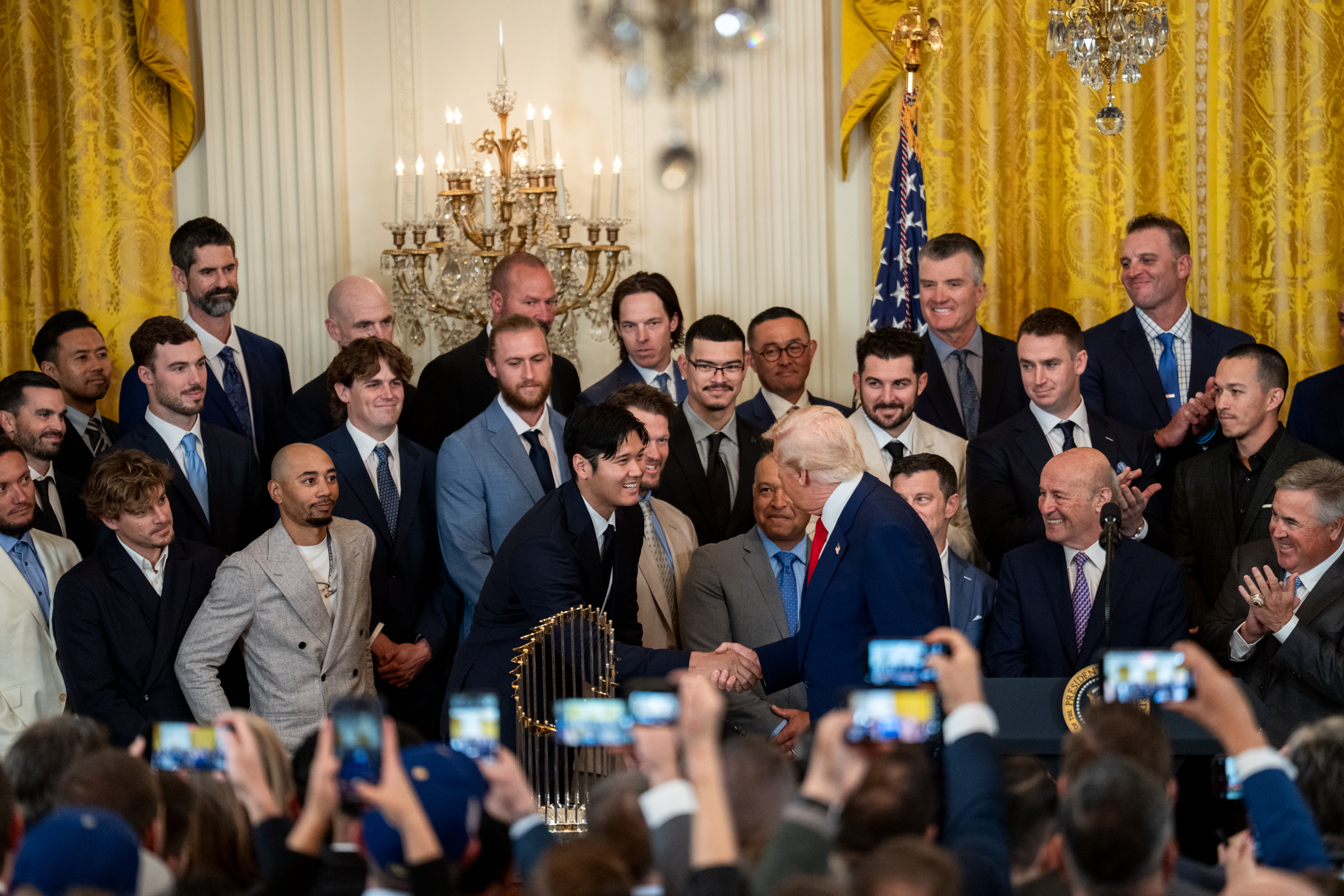
Shohei Ohtani shaking hands with President Donald Trump at the White House with the 2024 Dodgers championship team.

Instead of issuing its customary World Series video recap on Blu-Ray and DVD, MLB commissioned a three-part streaming docuseries from Apple TV+, which was produced by Derek Jeter's Cap 2 Productions, Ron Howard's and Brian Grazer's Imagine Documentaries, and R.J. Cutler's This Machine Filmworks. Fight For Glory: 2024 World Series was released on Apple TV+ in March, around the start of the 2025 season.

One month later, another Los Angeles area team defeated a New York City area team for a league championship: the LA Galaxy over the New York Red Bulls in the MLS Cup 2024, 2–1.

On January 10, 2025, MLB announced that the punishment for the two Yankees fans ejected for their Game 4 interference—Austin Capobianco and John "Peter" Hansen—had been increased to a permanent ban from every Major League Baseball facility and stadium.

=== Dodgers ===
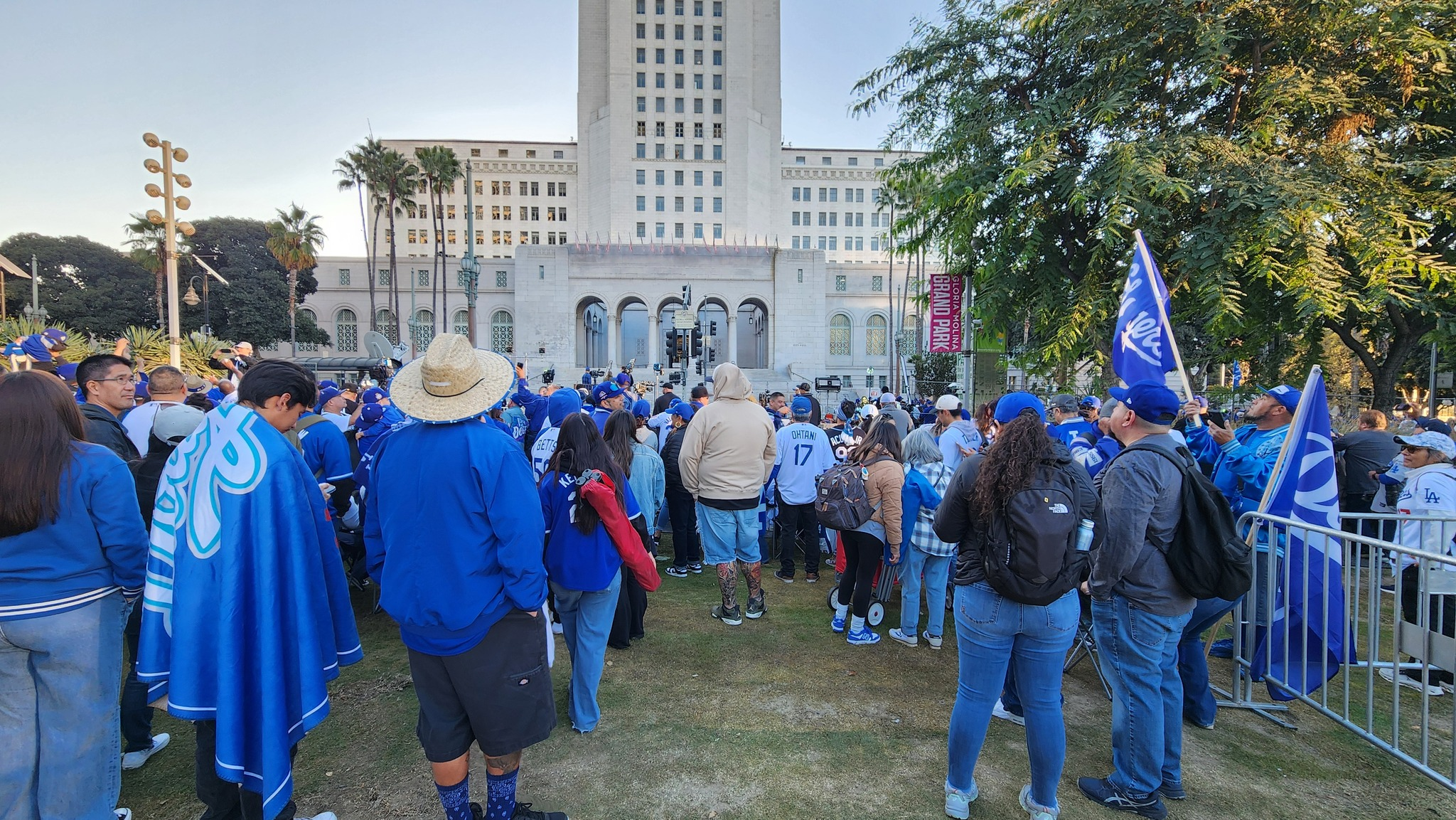
Fans begin to assemble in front of Los Angeles City Hall before the start of the November 1, 2024 victory parade.

With the win, the Dodgers broke a tie with the Cardinals (1926, 1942) to become the only visiting franchise to clinch three World Series championships (1955, 1981, 2024) on the Yankees' home field, and were the first road team to clinch the championship at Yankee Stadium since the Florida Marlins did so in 2003. They also joined the Houston Astros as the only teams to defeat the Yankees in four separate postseasons. As they also defeated the New York Mets in the NLCS, the Dodgers became the first team in MLB history to eliminate two teams from the same city in one postseason.

In the hours after the Game 5 win, there were isolated incidents in Los Angeles, such as fans spray-painting graffiti on an occupied Metro bus and then lighting it on fire, and others looting a Nike store in Downtown Los Angeles. Los Angeles Police called a tactical alert. A fan sustained a serious injury to his hand lighting a firework. On November 1, 2024, the Dodgers held a parade from Los Angeles City Hall to L.A. Central Public Library along Grand Avenue, then a celebration at Dodger Stadium. The celebrations also included fan tributes to former Dodgers star pitcher Fernando Valenzuela, who would have turned 64 years old on the day of the parade. An estimated two million fans attended the parade.

In December 2024, Freeman's walk-off grand slam ball would sell for $1.56 million, the third-highest price of any baseball at the time of the sale, behind only Shohei Ohtani's 50-50 home run ball from September and Mark McGwire's 70th home run ball from 1998.

The Dodgers would successfully defend their World Series title in 2025, defeating the Toronto Blue Jays in seven games. They were the first back-to-back champions since the Yankees three-peat from 1998–2000.

=== Yankees ===
"I think falling short in the World Series will stick with me until I die"

— Yankees star Aaron Judge, in spring training the following season

Despite losing in five games, the Yankees had more hits, more home runs, more stolen bases, and more walks over the course of the series. On the pitching side, they allowed far fewer base runners and held a lower ERA than the Dodgers. New York even outscored Los Angeles through nine innings throughout the five games. The Yankees, however, also played poor defense throughout the series compared to the Dodgers, which was highlighted by the five-run fifth inning in Game 5 that saw New York not convert three routine plays into outs. New York baseball sportswriter Bill Madden would call the Yankees 2024 World Series loss one of the worst in franchise history, while fellow New York sportswriter Joel Sherman referred to the series as a dark cloud over the Aaron Boone and Aaron Judge era, who fell to 1-7 to non-AL Central teams in the postseason since 2017.

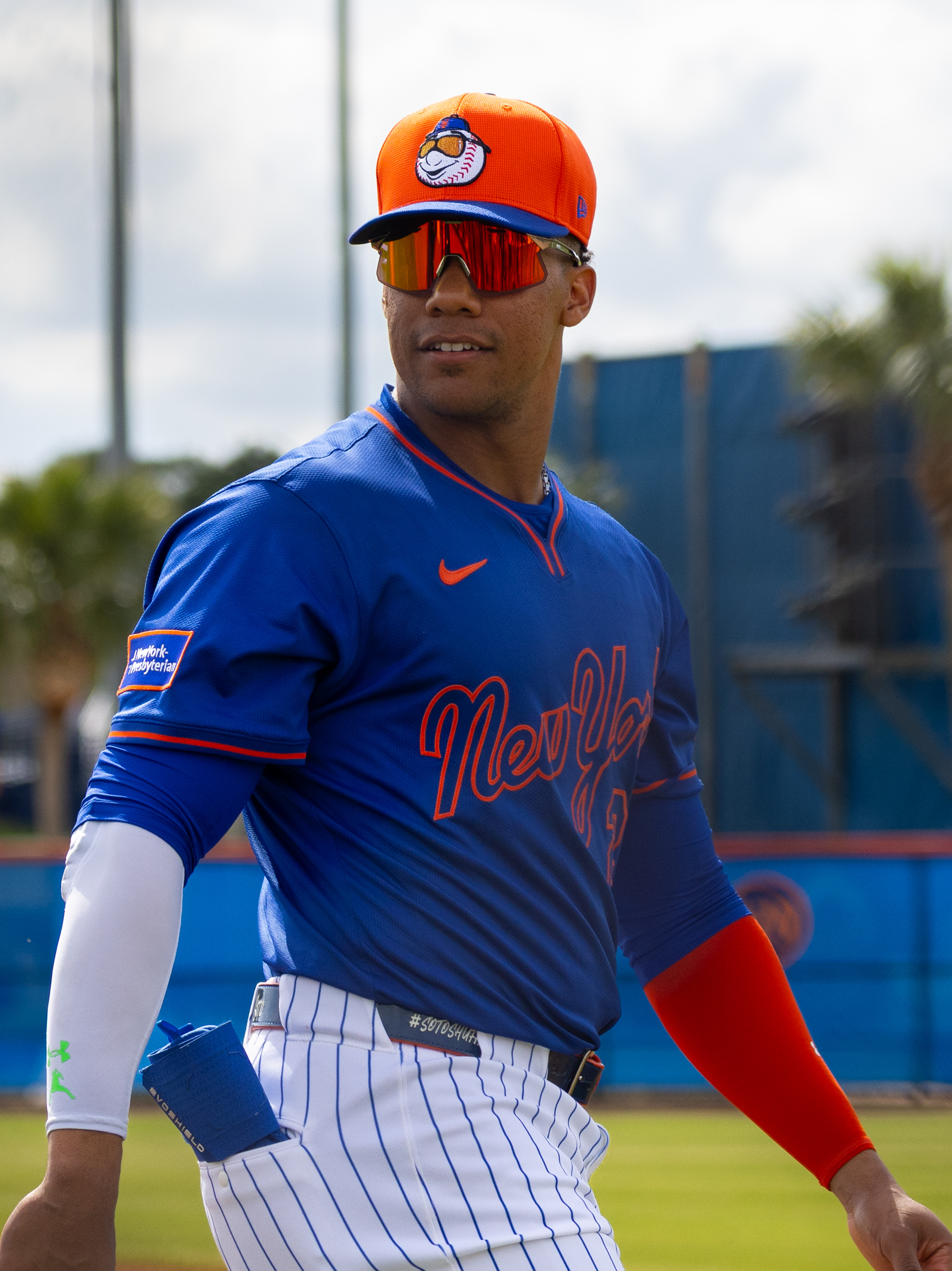
The New York Mets outbid the Yankees for Juan Soto's services in the off-season.

In the lead-up to the series, Dodgers' scouts told their players to put the ball in play and make the Yankees execute (this in reference to New York's sloppy defense throughout the season). Summarizing it, Jeff Passan of ESPN noted that although the Dodgers "scored 25 runs to the Yankees' 24 ... the Dodgers won the World Series in convincing fashion, over five games, because they were better in close contests and more fundamentally sound."

In addition, Boone specifically was criticized heavily for his Game 1 bullpen usage, in particular the decision to go to Nestor Cortes in a save situation with the bases loaded against Freddie Freeman in extra innings instead of Tim Hill. Cortes had been injured since the end of the regular season and had not pitched in the postseason prior to this moment.

Game 5 turned out to be Yankees' ace Gerrit Cole's last start for at least a year and a half, as he underwent Tommy John Surgery in spring training the following season. Despite Cole's unavailability and losing co-star Juan Soto to the New York Mets in free agency, the Yankees were AL favorites to return to the World Series the following season, thanks to spreading the money offered to Soto around to fill up other needs (trading for closer Devin Williams and outfielder Cody Bellinger, and signing ace pitcher Max Fried). However, they experienced a summer slump, which the NY Post would call it the "Boone Swoon", referring to the Yankees' slumps in recent years in June and July under manager Aaron Boone. This slump, coupled with a hot streak from the Toronto Blue Jays, ultimately cost them the American League East title, as they finished tied with the division-winning Blue Jays, but played poorly against them in the summer, which allowed Toronto to win the tie-breaker. They defeated their rival, the Boston Red Sox, in the Wild Card Series, but lost to the Blue Jays the next round in four games.

== See also ==
- 2024 Japan Series
- 2024 Korean Series
- Dodgers–Yankees rivalry
