= Uwa Goromo Station =

Railway station in Toyota, Aichi Prefecture, Japan

Uwa Goromo Station 上挙母駅

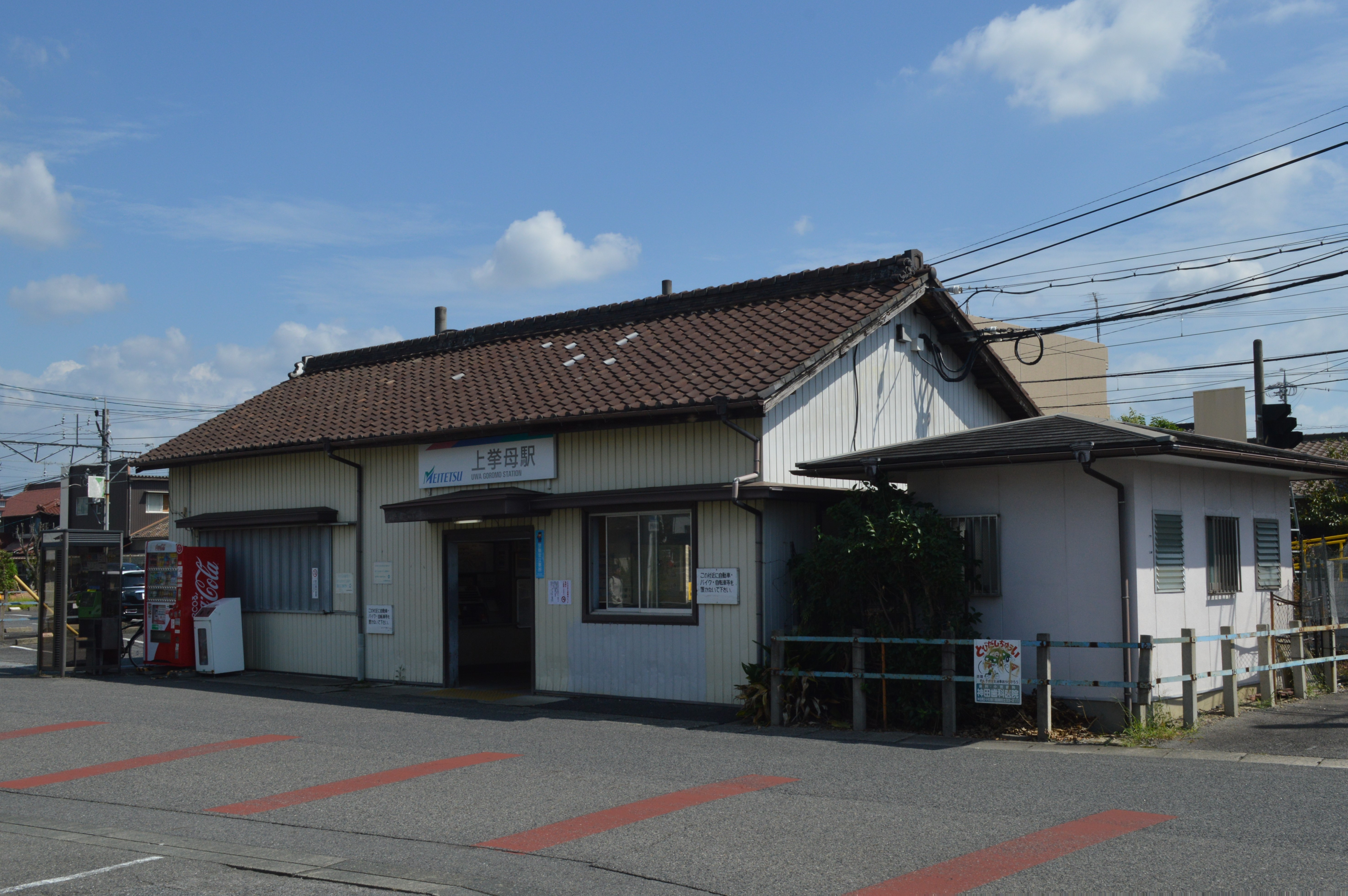
- Uwa Goromo Station, 2021

General information
- Location: 2-96 Kanayachō, Toyota-shi, Aichi-ken 471-0876; Japan
- Coordinates: 35.0721°N 137.1544°E
- Operator: Meitetsu
- Line: ■ Meitetsu Mikawa Line
- Distance: 13.9 kilometers from Chiryū
- Platforms: 1 island platform

Other information
- Status: Unstaffed
- Station code: MY06
- Website: Official website

History
- Opened: August 31, 1920

Passengers
- FY2017: 4438 daily

Services
Preceding station	Meitetsu	Following station
Toyotashi towards Sanage	Mikawa Line Sanage–Chiryū	Tsuchihashi towards Chiryū
Location
- Location within Aichi Prefecture Location within Japan

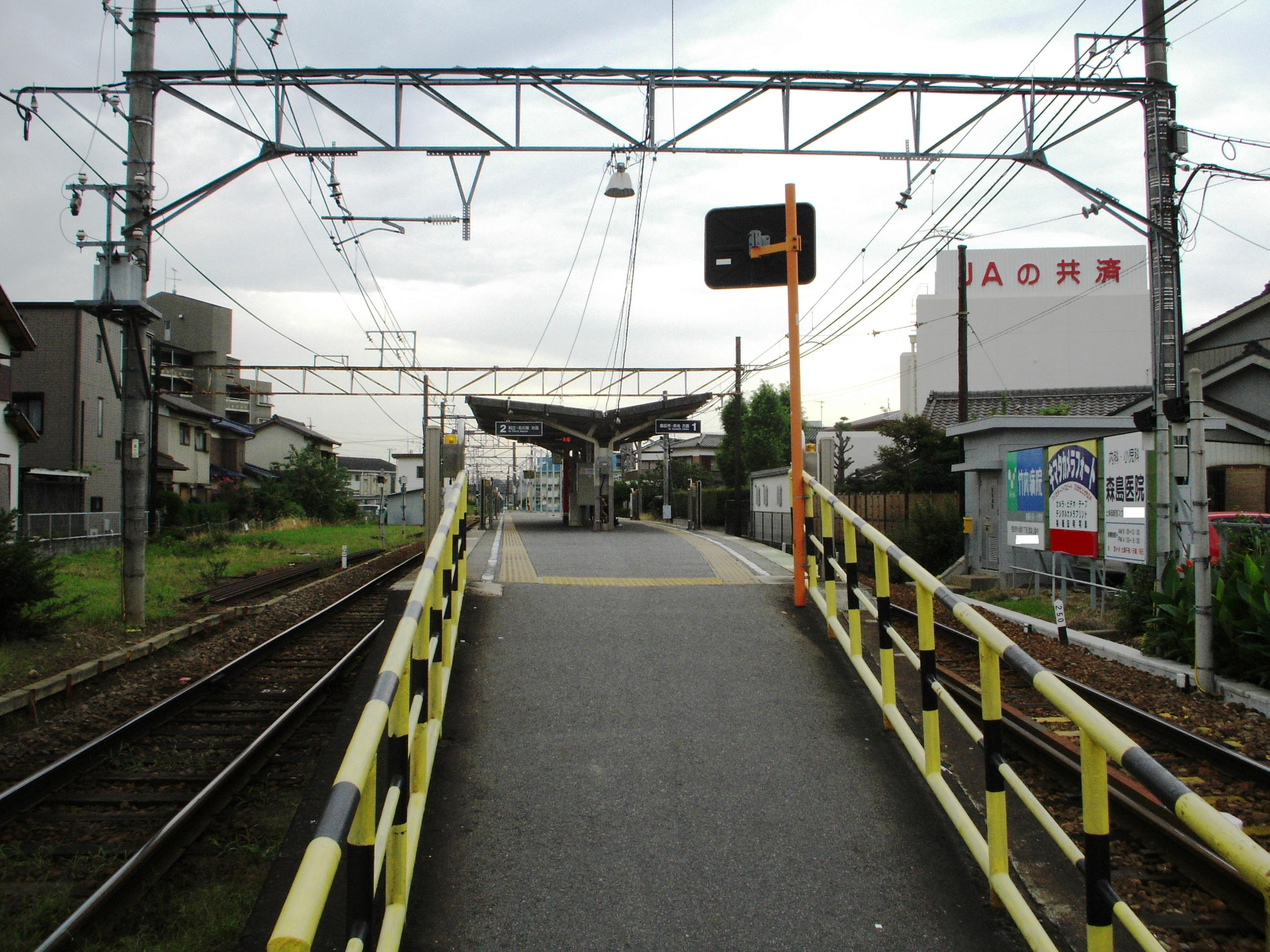
Platforms

Track Layout

Uwa Goromo Station (上挙母駅, Uwa Goromo-eki) is a railway station in the city of Toyota, Aichi, Japan operated by Meitetsu.

== Lines ==
Uwa Goromo Station is served by the Meitetsu Mikawa Line and is 13.9 km (8.6 mi) from the terminus of the line at Chiryū Station.

== Station layout ==
The station has a single island platform connected to the station building by a level crossing. The station has automated ticket machines, Manaca automated turnstiles and is unattended.

=== Platforms ===
1	■ Mikawa Line	For Toyotashi and Sanage
2	■ Mikawa Line	For Chiryū and Meitetsu-Nagoya

== Station history ==
Uwa Goromo Station was opened on August 31, 1920, as a station on the privately owned Mikawa Railway. On December 18, 1929, the Okazaki Line began operations to the station. The Mikawa Railway was merged with Meitetsu on June 1, 1941. Operations of the Okazaki Line (renamed the Koromo Line) were discontinued on March 4, 1973. The station has been unattended since June 16, 2001.

== Passenger statistics ==
In fiscal 2017, the station was used by an average of 4438 passengers daily (boarding passengers only).

== Surrounding area ==
- Sumitomo Rubber, Toyota factory
- Dojiyama Elementary School
- Japan National Route 155

== See also ==
- List of railway stations in Japan
