= Wakabayashi Station (Aichi) =

Railway station in Toyota, Aichi Prefecture, Japan

Wakabayashi Station 若林駅

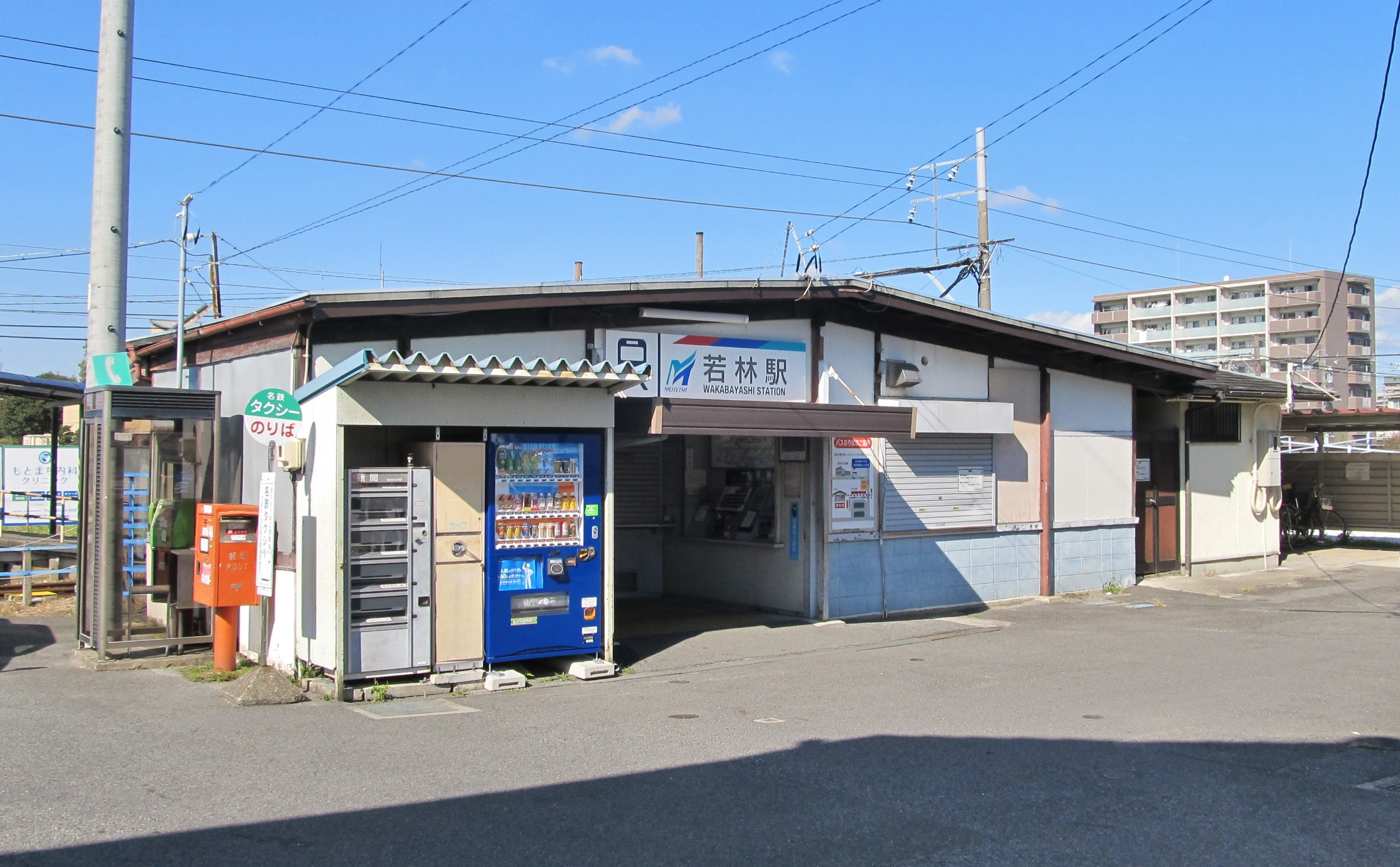
- Wakabayashi Station in October 2018

General information
- Location: Wakabashiya-Higashi-cho Okida 7-banchi, Toyota-shi, Aichi-ken 473-0914; Japan
- Coordinates: 35°01′36″N 137°05′49″E
- Operator: Meitetsu
- Line: ■ Meitetsu Mikawa Line
- Distance: 6.2 kilometers from Chiryū
- Platforms: 1 island platform

Other information
- Status: Unstaffed
- Station code: MY03
- Website: Official website

History
- Opened: 5 July 1920

Passengers
- FY2017: 6051 daily

Services
Preceding station	Meitetsu	Following station
Takemura towards Sanage	Mikawa Line Sanage–Chiryū	Mikawa Yatsuhashi towards Chiryū
Location
- Location within Aichi Prefecture Location within Japan

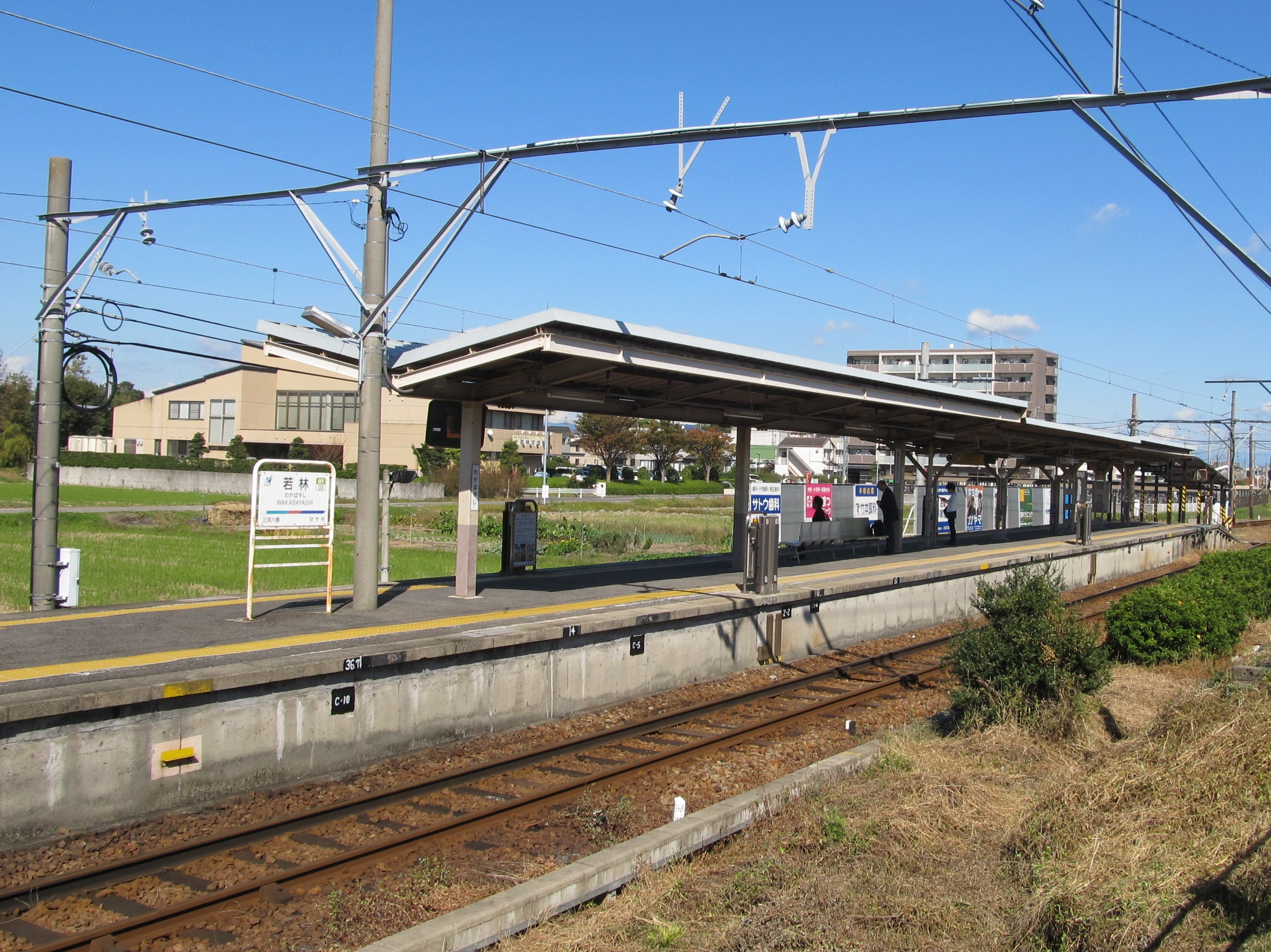
Platforms

Track Layout

Wakabayashi Station (若林駅, Wakabayashi-eki) is a railway station in the city of Toyota, Aichi, Japan, operated by Meitetsu.

== Lines ==
Wakabayashi Station is served by the Meitetsu Mikawa Line and is 6.2 km (3.9 mi) from the terminus of the line at Chiryū Station.

== Station layout ==
The station has a single island platform connected to the station building by a level crossing. The station has automated ticket machines, Manaca automated turnstiles and is unattended.

=== Platforms ===
1	■ Mikawa Line	For Chiryū and Meitetsu-Nagoya
2	■ Mikawa Line	For Toyotashi and Sanage

== Station history ==
Wakabayashi Station was opened on July 5, 1920, as a station on the privately owned Mikawa Railway. The Mikawa Railway was merged with Meitetsu on 1 June, 1941.

In 2021, Meitetsu began construction on a replacement station building, including the relocation of 2.2 km (1.4 mi) of track around the station onto an elevated guideway. The new elevated station is scheduled to begin operations on 28 March 2026.

== Passenger statistics ==
In fiscal 2017, the station was used by an average of 6051 passengers daily (boarding passengers only).

== Surrounding area ==
- Toyota Minami High School
- Wakabayashi Nishi Elementary School
- Wakabayashi Higashi Elementary School

== See also ==
- List of railway stations in Japan
