= Tsuchihashi Station =

Railway station in Toyota, Aichi Prefecture, Japan

Tsuchihashi Station 土橋駅

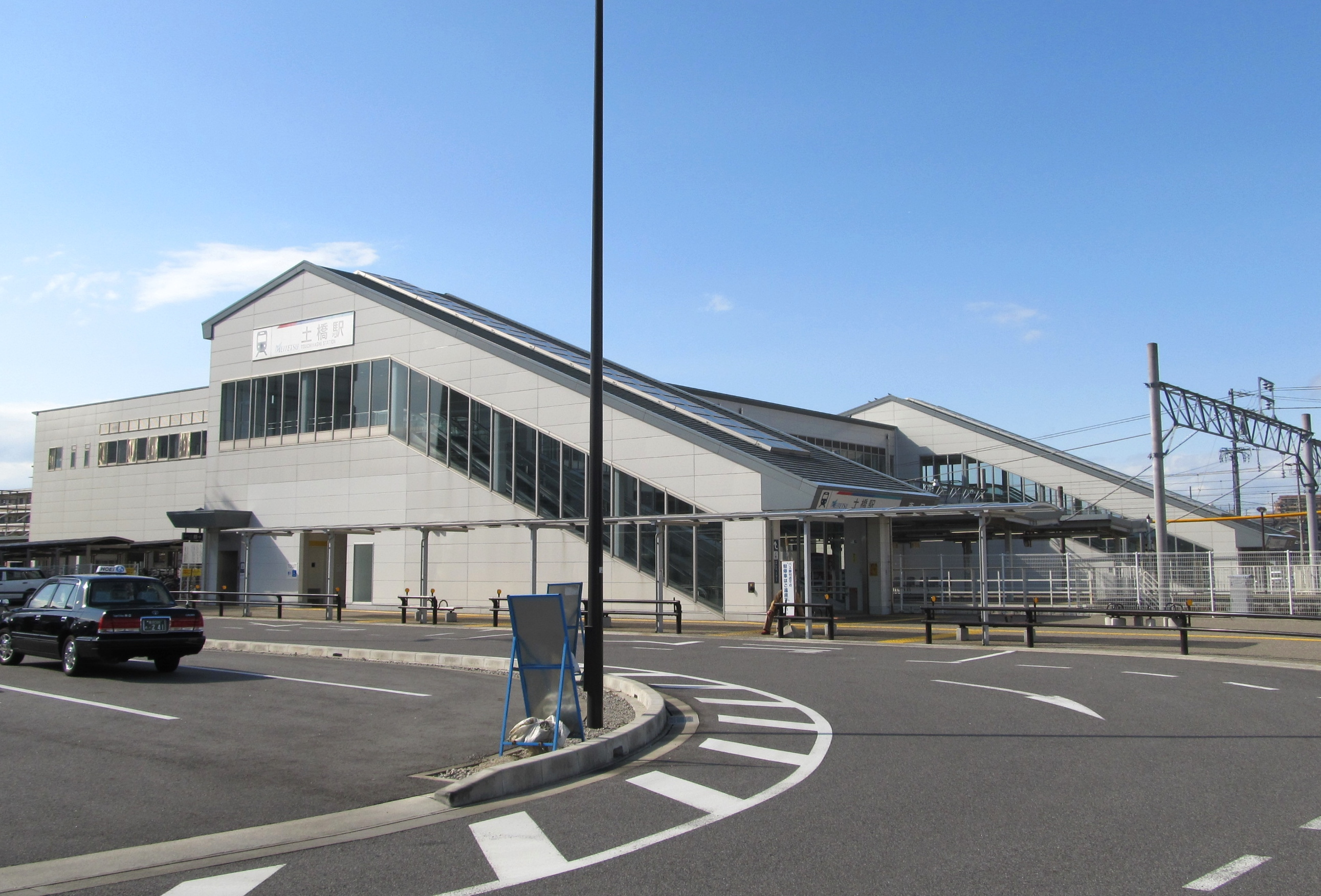
- Tsuchihashi Station, South exit, February 2019

General information
- Location: 8-145 Tsuchihashichō, Toyota-shi, Aichi-ken 471-0842; Japan
- Coordinates: 35.0583°N 137.13°E
- Operator: Meitetsu
- Line: ■ Meitetsu Mikawa Line
- Distance: 11.1 kilometers from Chiryū
- Platforms: 1 side + 1 island platform

Other information
- Status: Staffed
- Station code: MY05
- Website: Official website

History
- Opened: July 5, 1920

Passengers
- FY2017: 8023 daily

Services
Preceding station	Meitetsu	Following station
Uwa Goromo towards Sanage	Mikawa Line Sanage–Chiryū	Takemura towards Chiryū
Location
- Location within Aichi Prefecture Location within Japan

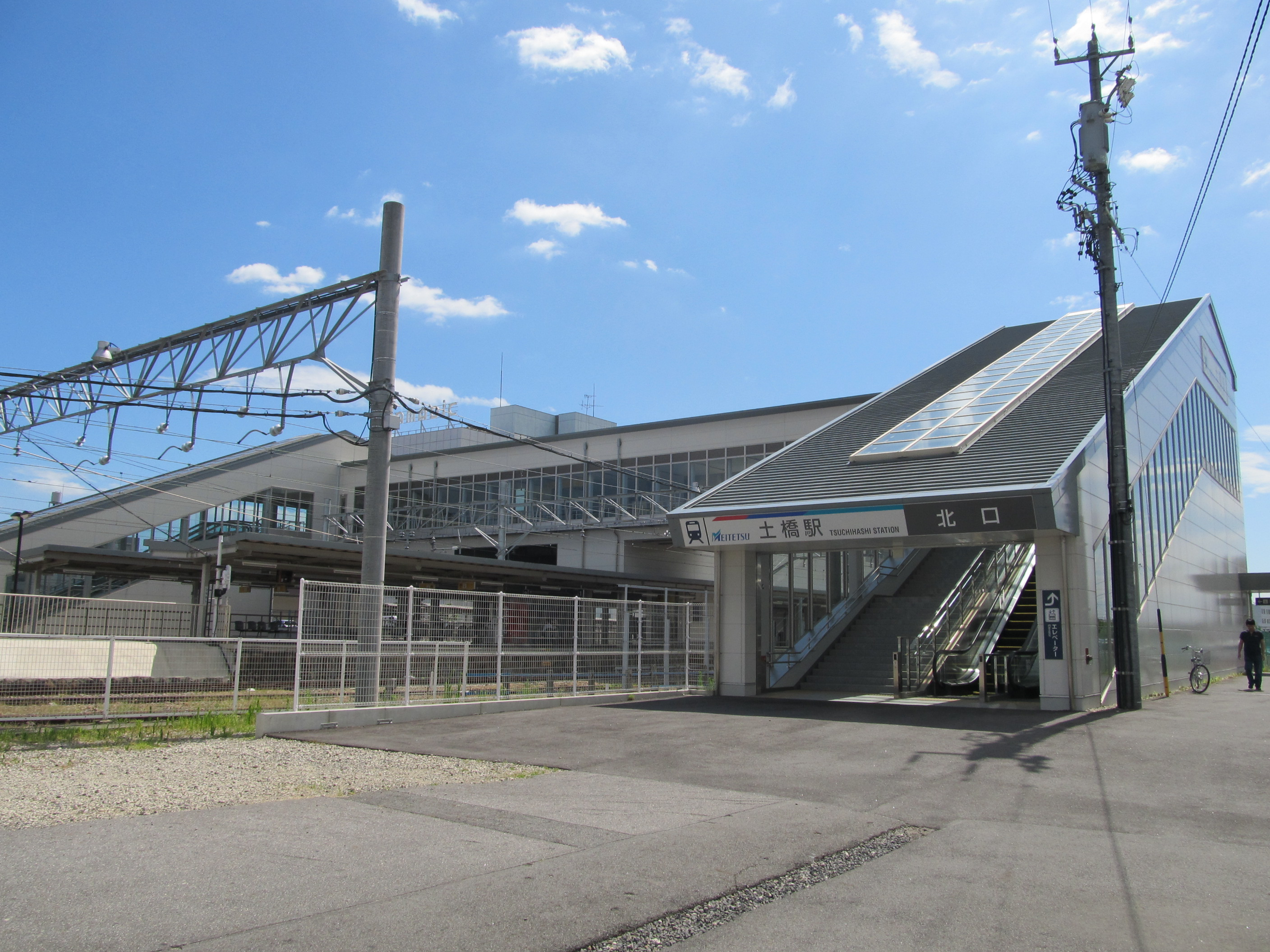
North exit

Track Layout

Tsuchihashi Station (土橋駅, Tsuchihashi-eki) is a railway station in the city of Toyota, Aichi, Japan, operated by Meitetsu.

== Lines ==
Tsuchihashi Station is served by the Meitetsu Mikawa Line and is 11.1 km (6.9 mi) from the terminus of the line at Chiryū Station.

== Station layout ==
The station has one side platform and one island platform, connected by an elevated station building. The station has automated ticket machines, Manaca automated turnstiles and is staffed.

=== Platforms ===
1, 2	■ Mikawa Line	ForToyotashi and Sanage
3	■ Mikawa Line	For Chiryū and Meitetsu-Nagoya

== Station history ==
Tsuchihashi Station was opened on July 5, 1920, as a station on the privately owned Mikawa Railway. The Mikawa Railway was merged with Meitetsu on June 1, 1941. All freight operations were discontinued in December 1983. A new station building was completed in 1994, and expanded in 2010.

== Passenger statistics ==
In fiscal 2017, the station was used by an average of 8023 passengers daily.

== Surrounding area ==
- Toyota Motomachi factory

== See also ==
- List of railway stations in Japan
