= Takemura Station =

Railway station in Toyota, Aichi Prefecture, Japan

Takemura Station 竹村駅

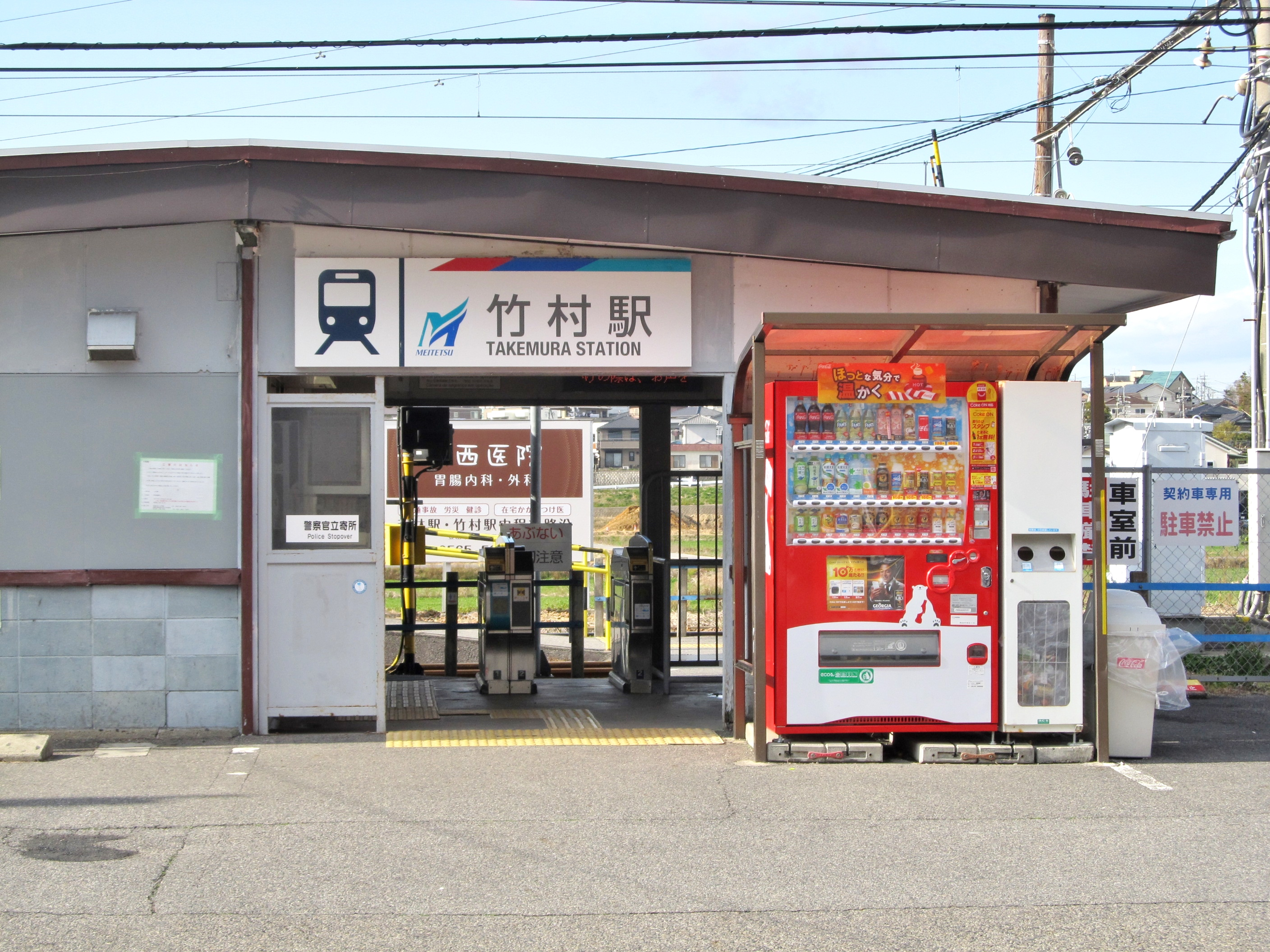
- Takemura Station, February 2019

General information
- Location: Miyashita-16 Takechō, Toyota-shi, Aichi-ken 473-0906; Japan
- Coordinates: 35.0402°N 137.1146°E
- Operator: Meitetsu
- Line: ■ Meitetsu Mikawa Line
- Distance: 8.5 kilometers from Chiryū
- Platforms: 1 island platform

Other information
- Status: Unstaffed
- Station code: MY004
- Website: Official website

History
- Opened: July 5, 1920

Passengers
- FY2017: 3216 daily

Services
Preceding station	Meitetsu	Following station
Tsuchihashi towards Sanage	Mikawa Line Sanage–Chiryū	Wakabayashi towards Chiryū
Location
- Location within Aichi Prefecture Location within Japan

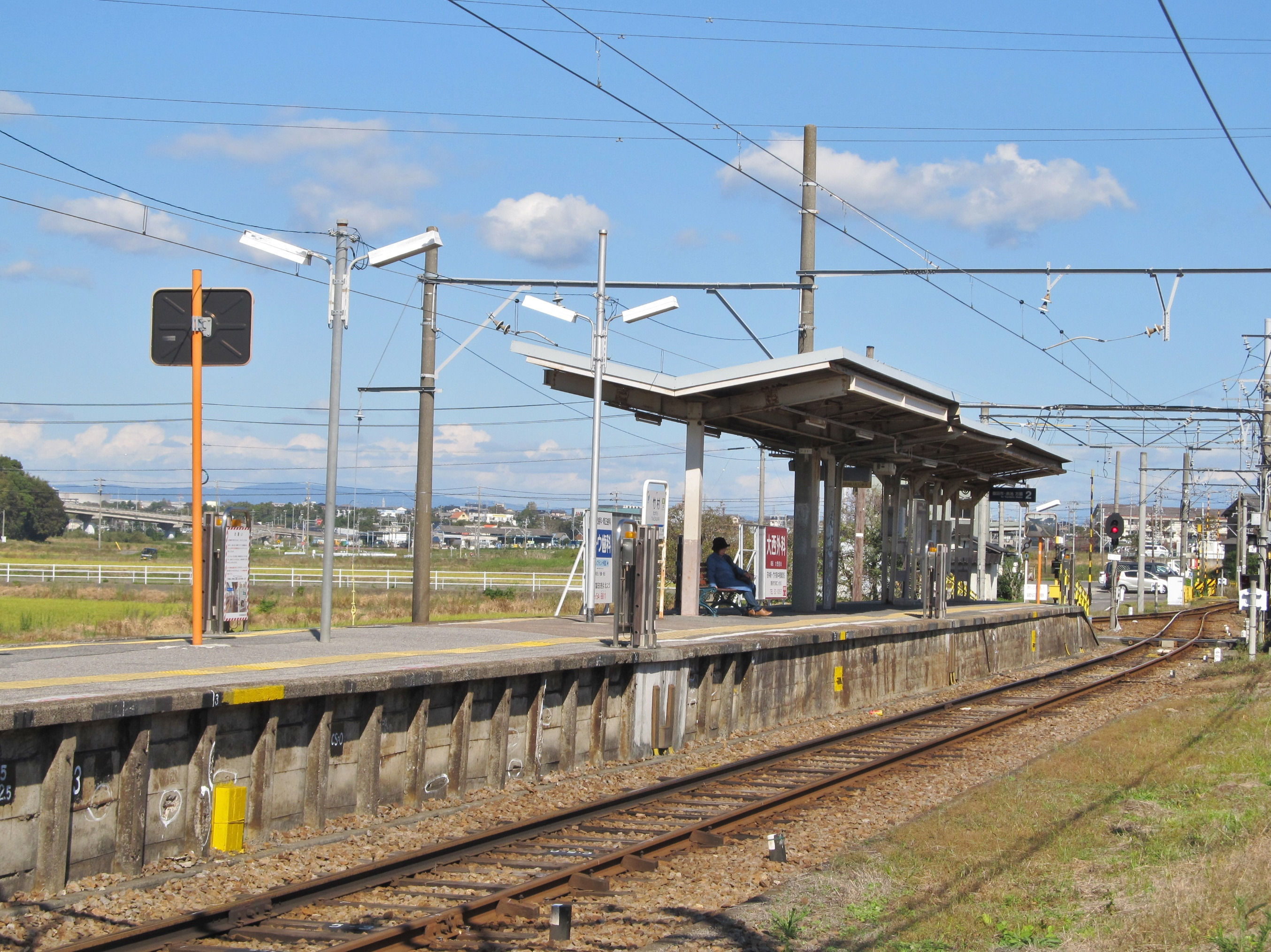
Platform

Takemura Station (竹村駅, Takemura-eki) is a railway station in the city of Toyota, Aichi, Japan, operated by Meitetsu.

== Lines ==
Takemura Station is served by the Meitetsu Mikawa Line and is 8.5 km (5.3 mi) from the terminus of the line at Chiryū Station.

== Station layout ==
The station has a single island platform connected to the station building by a level crossing. The station has automated ticket machines, Manaca automated turnstiles and is unattended.

=== Platforms ===
1	■ Mikawa Line	For Chiryū and Meitetsu-Nagoya
2	■ Mikawa Line	For Toyotashi and Sanage

== Station history ==
Takemura Station was opened on July 5, 1920, as a station on the privately owned Mikawa Railway. The Mikawa Railway was merged with Meitetsu on June 1, 1941.

== Passenger statistics ==
In fiscal 2017, the station was used by an average of 3216 passengers daily.

== Surrounding area ==
- Toyota Technical High School
- Takemura Elementary School
- Ryujin Junior High School

== See also ==
- List of railway stations in Japan
