= Mitsuhiro Nakamura =

Japanese announcer for Fuji Television (born 1984)

- 中村 光宏
- Born: 28 August 1984 (age 42); Shinagawa, Tokyo, Japan
- Other names: Mitsu (みつ); Mitchan (みっちゃん)
- Education: Keio University Law school Department of Political Science
- Occupation: Announcer
- Years active: 2007–
- Employer: Fuji Television
- Television: Current'; Your Time; VS Arashi; Former; Mezamashi TV; Sports Life Hero's
- Spouse: Yoko Shono (m. 2014)
- Website: Mitsuhiro Nakamura

Mitsuhiro Nakamura (中村 光宏, Nakamura Mitsuhiro; born 28 August 1984, in Tokyo) is a Japanese announcer for Fuji Television.

== Current programmes in charge ==
(As of 1 April 2017)

Title	Days	Notes
Your Time	Weekdays	In charge of sports
Majo ni Iwa retai Yoru	Mondays	Late nights
VS Arashi	Thursdays	Voice of the sky
CS Wareme De Pon		Live condition
CS AKB Kankō Taishi		Narration
Figure Skate-Yakyū-Soccer-Volleyball Hitoshi		Relays

=== Irregular programmes in charge ===
Dates	Title	Notes	Ref.
12 Apr 2012 – 4 Apr 2013, 2 Jul 2015 – 20 Oct 2016	VS Arashi	Voice of the second generation (live commentary). From July 2015, he appeared irregularly with a special project narration and until 20 October 2016 he was in charge of substitution when Hiroyuki Amano was absent. (Broadcasting minutes on 24 November 2016 and 9 March 2017, broadcasting department responsible on 1 December 2016 and 19 January, 2 and 9 February 2017, and broadcasting charge on 23 March 2017 (guest appearance)) Irregular cast appearances are in charge of the fifth generation (live commentaries) by male announcers of Fuji TV on a weekly basis.	

=== Former programmes in charge ===
Dates	Title	Days	Notes	Ref.
14 Jul 2007	Hakken!! "Junk News"			
14 Jul, 8, 9 Sep 2007	FNN Super News Weekend		Reported "Chiba prefectural life forest resort Tarzania" on 14 July, hit on the sports corner on 8 and 9 September; From October 2007 to March 2008, appeared on "Nichiyō Tokushū Itsuka wa Tatsujin" (appeared once a month)	
14 Jul 2007 –	Fuji Ana Stadium Marunama		Occasionally	
29 Jul 2007	FNS 27-Jikan TV: Minna "Namaka" da'! Ukkī! Happy! Saiyūki!			
23 Sep 2007	Owarai Champion Bowling		Member of the Fuji announcer team	
15 Oct 2007 – 25 Sep 2008	Shopan		Narration, occasionally	
Oct 2007 – Sep 2012	Sweet Den of Premiere			
	Ana Ban!			
1 Jan 2008	Dai 41-kai Hatsumōde! Bakushō Hit Parade		Relaying of Sayaka Aoki and Taishakuten	
1 Jan 2008	Shinshun Kakushigei Taikai		"Ikemen Jumpers"	
Jan–Sep 2008	FNN Rainbow Hatsu			
5 Apr 2008 – Mar 2012, 7 Apr 2012 – 29 Mar 2014	Mezamashi Saturday		Sports caster, later Information caster	
26 Apr 2008	GW Super Quiz Week Chokuzen SP		Challenged the quiz with fellow announcers Yukari Oshima and Yoko Shono	
Apr–Sep	Mezamashi TV		Coco-chō	
12 Jul 2008 – 25 Sep 2010	Mezamashi Saturday Mega			
18 Jul 2008 –	Honjitsu Kenkoku! United States of Odaiba: Mezamashi Manatsu no Dai Chūkei			
25 Aug 2008 –	Hey! Hey! Hey! Music Champ		Occasionally	
30 Aug 2008	Bakushō Pink Carpet		MC	
13 Oct 2008 –	Atarashī Nami 16		Narrator	
Oct 2008 –	Gentei-hin Collabonese II		MC	
1 Jan 2009	Dai 42-kai Hatsumōde! Bakushō Hit Parade		Helicopter relay	
1 Apr 2009 – 29 Sep 2010	Waratte Iitomo!		Telephone announcer in charge of Wednesdays	
21 Apr 2009 –	Fukuramu Scrum!!		Narrator	
1 Jan 2010	Dai 43-kai Hatsumōde! Bakushō Hit Parade		Helicopter relay	
10 Mar 2010	Quiz! Hexagon II		Announcer Team	
24 Mar 2010 –	Super GT Complete		MC	
24, 25 Jul 2010	FNS 26-jikan TV		In charge of the real situation analyst of "Hexagon Family 24-Jikan Ekiden -Kizuna-"; For the two days, he rode in outside broadcasting and chat with director and commentator Masako Chiba	
1 Jan 2011	Dai 44-kai Hatsumōde! Bakushō Hit Parade		Helicopter relay	
10 Apr 2011 – Mar 2012	Waratte Iitomo! Zōkan-gō		Extra number issue; from 5 Apr 2009 to 3 Oct 2010, Wednesday regular (VTR)	
	Waratte Iitomo! Tokudai-gō		Fuji TV Kaikyoku 50-shūnen Waratte Iitomo! Tokudai-gō; Waratte Iitomo! Toshiwasure Tokudai-gō!; Waratte Iitomo! Toshiwasure Tokudai-gō! Kitto Rainen wa Iitomo Low SP	
1 Jan 2012	Dai 45-kai Hatsumōde! Bakushō Hit Parade		Helicopter relay	
Apr 2012 – Mar 2013	Non Stop!		In charge of Mondays	
14 Apr 2012 –	Premium Saturday Bakushō Red Carpet		Replacement for announcer Hitomi Nakamura	
1 Apr – 27 Sep 2013	Ageru TV		Information Caster	
30 Sep 2013 – 24 Mar 2017	Mezamashi TV		Information caster (Thursdays and Fridays), later Sports caster (Thursdays and Fridays, later Mondays to Wednesdays, and back to Thursdays and Fridays)	
3 Apr 2014 – 27 Mar 2015	Mezamashi TV Aqua	Thursdays and Fridays	Main caster	
5 Apr 2014 – 10 Jan 2015 –	Sport!	Saturdays	Sub-caster, later main caster	
2 Apr 2016 – 25 Mar 2017	Sports Life Hero's	Saturdays	Caster	
	Mājan Saikyō-sen		Aired on Fuji TV Next; from live commentary in 2013	
	KinKi Kids no Bumbobourg	Sundays	Narration	
