= Mitsuhiro Takemura =

Japanese scholar

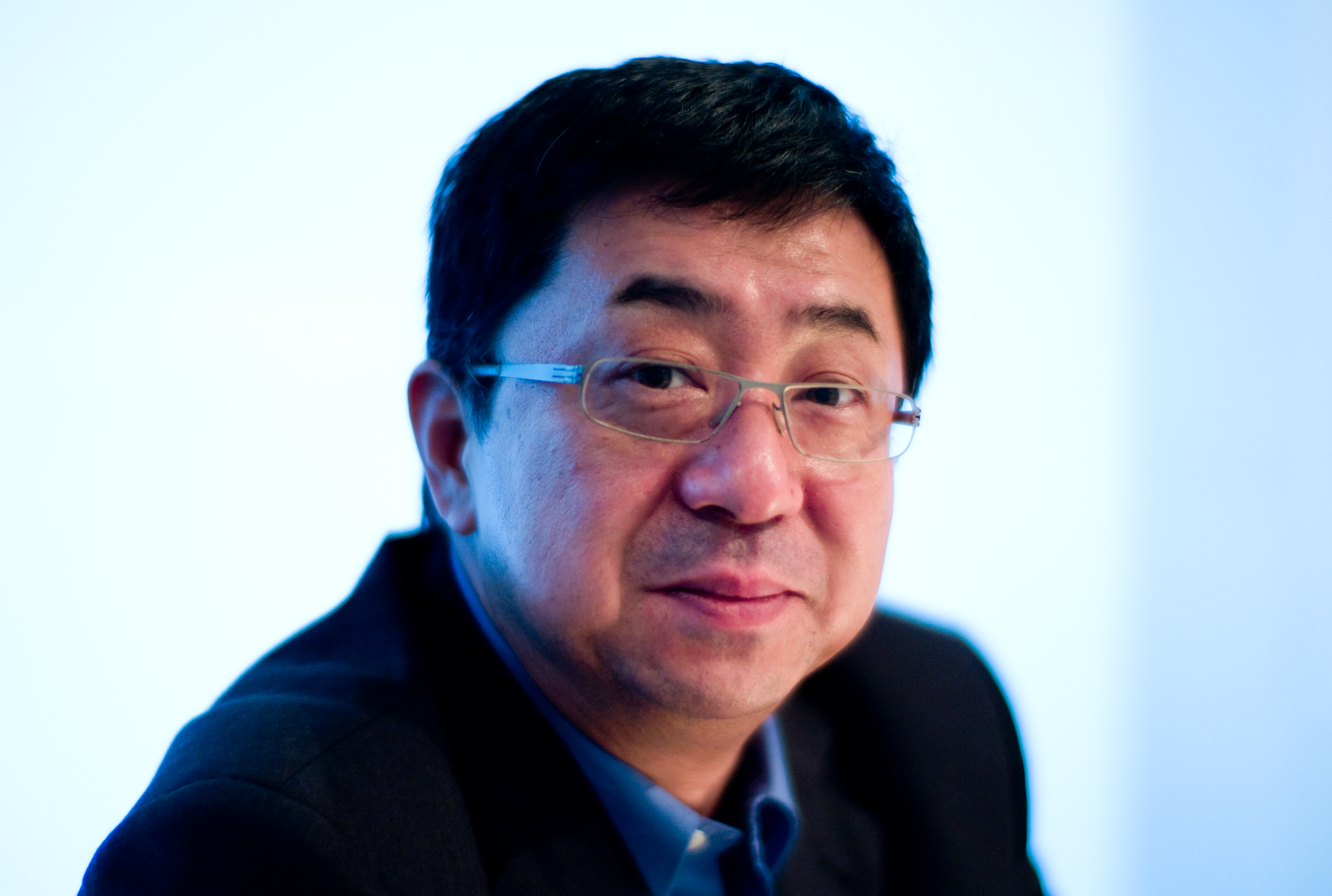
Mitsuhiro Takemura

Mitsuhiro Takemura (武邑 光裕; born 1954-10-25 in Tokyo) is a Japanese scholar specializing in the study of media design, professor at Sapporo City University.

Takemura graduated from Nihon University in 1976 and received a master's degree from the same school in 1978.
