= February 1914 =

Month of 1914

<<	February 1914					>>
Su	Mo	Tu	We	Th	Fr	Sa
1	2	3	4	5	6	7
8	9	10	11	12	13	14
15	16	17	18	19	20	21
22	23	24	25	26	27	28

The following events occurred in February 1914:

Prince Wilhelm assumes the throne of the Principality of Albania.

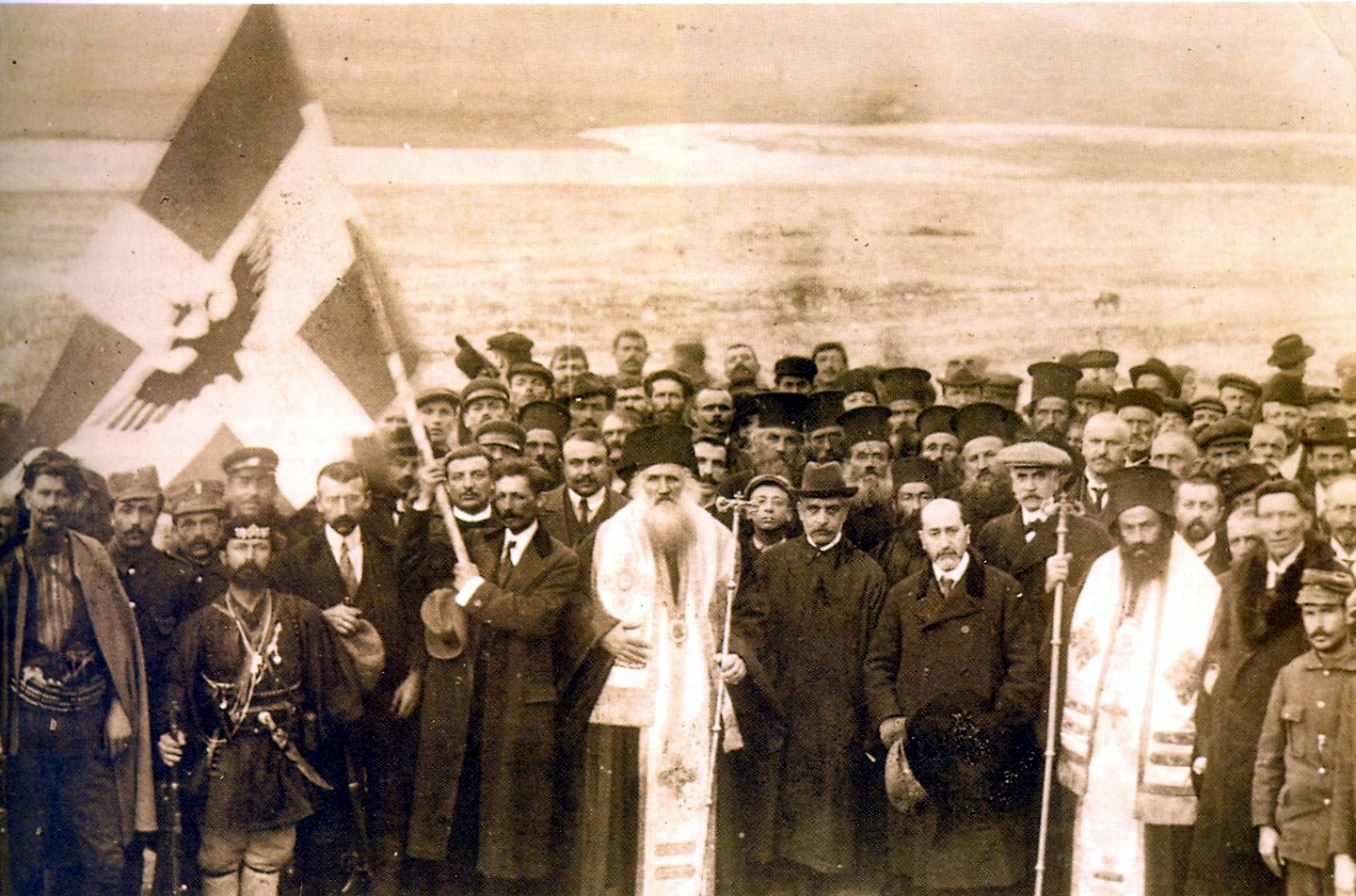
Northern Epirus declares independence.

== February 1, 1914 (Sunday) ==
- The Imperial Japanese Navy set up a commission to investigate allegations of the Vice Admiral and other receiving illicit commissions on foreign contracts.
- The Tanganyika Railway reached Kigoma, German East Africa, (now part of Tanzania).
- The Aero Club of America announced plans to sponsor an around-the-world airplane race.
- Canadian Arctic Expedition – Alistair Mackay, the expedition's medical doctor, along with three other members of the expedition crew, wrote and signed a letter dated February 1 for Karluk captain Robert Bartlett stating their desire to leave "Shipwreck Camp" – the temporary site the crew made shortly before the polar exploration ship sank in January: "We, the undersigned, in consideration of the present critical situation, desire to make an attempt to reach the land." The letter requested appropriate supplies, and concluded by emphasizing that the journey was on their own initiative and absolving Bartlett from all responsibilities.
- World Baseball Tour – The tour reached Cairo where the New York Giants and Chicago White Sox played to a tie of 3-3 after 10 innings when the game was called on account of darkness.
- The Argentinian association football club Patronato was formed in Paraná, Entre Ríos, Argentina.
- Born:
  - A. K. Hangal, Indian freedom fighter and character actor in Hindi language films; as Avtar Kishan Hangal, in Sialkot, Punjab, British India (present-day India) (d. 2012)
  - Jale İnan, Turkish archaeologist, led excavations of Perga and Side, Turkey; in Istanbul, Ottoman Empire (present-day Turkey) (d. 2001)
- Died:
  - Albert Günther, German-British biologist, credited with identifying close to 350 reptiles (b. 1830)
  - James Grant Wilson, Scottish-American publisher and author, president of the New York Genealogical and Biographical Society (b. 1832)

== February 2, 1914 (Monday) ==
- The Union Party of the Faroe Islands retained power in following partial elections held in the southern part of the island nation, with 12 of the 20 seats in the Løgting.
- World Baseball Tour – Players with the New York Giants and Chicago White Sox toured the ancient Egyptian wonders of Alexandria in their baseball uniforms before the Giants trounced the White Sox 6-3 during an exhibition game of 5,000, more than double the crowd in Cairo.
- Members of an association football club in Belém, Brazil protested against a decision of the national football federation by terminating the team and refounding it as the Paysandu Sport Club, which won three national titles in the late 1990s and 2000s.
- Charlie Chaplin made his film debut in Making a Living, where he played Edgar English, a lady-charming swindler who ran afoul with the Keystone Cops. The film was written and directed by Henry Lehrman.
- James Joyce's semi-autobiographical novel A Portrait of the Artist as a Young Man commenced serialization in The Egoist, a new London literary magazine founded by Dora Marsden.
- The song "Too Ra Loo Ra Loo Ral", also known as "The Irish Lullaby," by Irish-American composer James Royce Shannon debuted in the Chauncey Olcott musical Shameen Dhu in New York City. The song became famous again when sung by Bing Crosby in Going My Way.
- The cartoon Abie the Agent by Harry Hershfield debuted in the New York Journal.

== February 3, 1914 (Tuesday) ==
- American engineer Willis Carrier patented the design for the air conditioner.
- Royal Navy destroyer HMS Legion was launched by William Denny and Brothers and would serve in the Battle off Texel during World War I.
- German aviator Bruno Langer set a new flight endurance record, flying nonstop for 14 hours 7 minutes.
- The association football club Santa Cruz was founded as a society by a group of teens who group up playing football (soccer) on the street in front of the Santa Cruz Church in Recife, Brazil. The football society was eventually accepted into the Pernambucan Sport League in 1917. The club plays regularly at the Arruda Stadium in Recife.
- Born:
  - George Nissen, American gymnast and inventor of the trampoline; in Blairstown, Iowa, United States (d. 2010)
  - Etti Plesch, Austro-Hungarian noble, famous socialite and racehorse owner; as Countess Maria Anna Paula Ferdinandine von Wurmbrand-Stuppach, in Vienna, Austria-Hungary (present-day Austria) (d. 2003)
  - Felix Kelly, New Zealand artist, known for his cartoon and illustration work under the alias Fix; in Auckland, New Zealand (d. 1994)
  - Michel Thomas, Polish-French linguist and Resistance fighter, patented the Michel Thomas Method for teaching languages; as Moniek Krostof, in Łódź, Russian Empire (present-day Poland) (d. 2005)

== February 4, 1914 (Wednesday) ==
- Canadian Arctic Expedition – Bjarne Mamen, who scouted for a four-man team led by the (sunken) Karluk's first officer Alexander Anderson to the north shore of Wrangel Island in the Beaufort Sea, returned to "Shipwreck Camp" and reported to Karluk captain Robert Bartlett that he had left the group a few miles short of land that was evidently not Wrangel Island, and was probably Herald Island, 38 miles (61 km) from their intended destination. Mamen was the last to see the Anderson party alive; their ultimate fate was not established until ten years later, when their remains were found on Herald Island.
- The same day of Mamen's return to Shipwreck Camp, the expedition's medical officer Alistair Mackay presented a letter to Barlett that he and three other members signed, expressing desire to leave camp and seek land. In a decision later censured by an admiralty commission as questionable leadership, Bartlett allowed Mackay and his group to leave and allocated them a sledge, a tent, and food supplies for up to 50 days.
- Lens manufacturer LOMO was established in Saint Petersburg.
- A staging of George A. Birmingham's comedy General John Regan at Westport Town Hall in Ireland provoked a riot.
- Cuban chess player José Raúl Capablanca won against Ossip Bernstein of Russia during an exhibition game in Moscow, the first of several noted victories against other fellow chess masters before competition at the St. Petersburg chess tournament in April.
- Born:
  - Alfred Andersch, German writer, author of The Father of a Murderer; in Munich, German Empire (present-day Germany) (d. 1980)
  - João Hogan, Portuguese painter, famous for his neo-figurative landscapes; in Lisbon, Portugal (d. 1988)
- Died:
  - Frederick Lorz, American long-distance runner, cheated during the men's marathon at the 1904 Summer Olympics (b. 1884)
  - Sigmund Mogulesko, Yiddish-American actor, founder of the Rumanian Opera House in New York City (b. 1858)

== February 5, 1914 (Thursday) ==
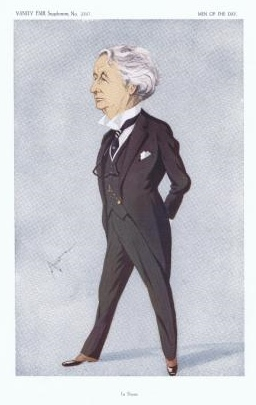
Caricature of English actor Charles Wyndham from the January 7, 1914, issue of Vanity Fair, one of the last before the British magazine folded.

- Prince Abdullah I bin al-Hussein, son of Hussein bin Ali, Sharif of Mecca, met with Herbert Kitchener, British Governor General of Egypt and the Sudan, in Cairo to discuss British support against potential Turkish military movement against Hejaz region in what is now Saudi Arabia. While Kitchener made no immediate pledges of support, talks between Britain and the Sharif continued, resulting in a firm alliance during the outbreak of World War I and incentive for Arabia to side with the Allies.
- Canadian Arctic Expedition – Alistair Mackay and three other members of the expedition left "Shipwreck Camp" with a sled fully stocked with supplies in an attempt to find land. They were last seen a few days later by Karluk ship steward Ernest Chafe and the Inuit members of the party who were on a return mission from Herald Island to check on the four-man scouting team that left for the island about two weeks earlier. Open water prevented Chafe's team from reaching the island, forcing them back and running into Mackay's party who were struggling to make headway. Despite some members showing signs of hypothermia, Mackay's group refused assistance and rejected Chafe's pleas that they return with him to Shipwreck Camp. The group was never seen alive after that although there was evidence they might have been crushed by shifting surface ice or else had fallen through.
- Adolf Hitler failed his physical exam in Salzburg and was declared unfit for military service.
- The Mikawa railroad opened in Aichi Prefecture, Japan, with stations Ōhama-minat, Kariyamachi, Kita Shinkawa, Ogakie, Shinkawa-machi, Takahama-minato, and Yoshihama serving the line.
- The final issue of the British weekly magazine Vanity Fair was published, after which it merged with the magazine Hearth and Home.
- The village of Empress, Alberta was established.
- Born:
  - William S. Burroughs, American Beat Generation writer, author of Naked Lunch; in St. Louis, United States (d. 1997)
  - Alan Hodgkin, British physiologist, recipient of the 1963 Nobel Prize in Physiology or Medicine for his research into neurons; in Banbury, England (d. 1998)
- Died: William Rhodes, American football player and manager, tackle and coach for the Yale University football team (b. 1840)

== February 6, 1914 (Friday) ==
- A protest march of 32,000 farmers, organized by Conservative opponents of the Liberal government of Prime Minister of Sweden Karl Staaff, gathered in the courtyard of Stockholm Palace to demand higher defense spending that reflected growing political tension in Europe. In what became known as the Courtyard Crisis, Swedish monarch King Gustaf declared to the demonstrators that he shared their concerns, violating Sweden's constitution for the monarchy to be non-partisan.
- The Roman Catholic Diocese of Cajazeiras was established in Brazil.
- The United Suffragists was established in Great Britain.
- Born:
  - Thurl Ravenscroft, American voice actor, best known as the voice of Tony the Tiger for Kellogg's Frosted Flakes; in Norfolk, Nebraska, United States (d. 2005)
  - Forrest Towns, American runner, gold medalist at the 1936 Summer Olympics, in Fitzgerald, Georgia (d. 1991)
- Died: Albert Neuhuys, Dutch painter, associated with the Hague School that flourished between 1860 and 1890 (b. 1844)

== February 7, 1914 (Saturday) ==
- Royal Navy destroyer Landrail was launched at Yarrow shipyard in Glasgow. It would participate in many of the naval battles in World War I including the Battle of Jutland.
- German pilot Karl Ingold set a new world flight endurance record, flying nonstop for 16 hours 20 minutes in an Aviatik biplane. The flight, from Mulhouse to Munich, Germany, covered a distance of 1,700 km (1,056 miles).
- Steel work was completed on the Exposition Auditorium, now the Bill Graham Civic Auditorium in San Francisco, for the Panama–Pacific International Exposition in 1915. The auditorium was designed to accommodate up to 7,000 people for events.
- The Swedish association football club Halmstad was formed in Halmstad, Sweden.
- Charlie Chaplin introduced to film audiences his trademark character The Tramp in his second film, in the Keystone comedy Kid Auto Races at Venice, (although first filmed in Mabel's Strange Predicament, released two days later).
- Died:
  - Joseph Auguste Émile Vaudremer, French architect, recipient of the Prix de Rome (b. 1829)
  - John Parker Hawkins, American army officer, Commissioner General of the Army of the Tennessee during the American Civil War (b. 1830)

== February 8, 1914 (Sunday) ==
- The Armenian reform package was signed between the Ottoman Empire and Imperial Russia, which envisaged the creation of two provinces in Turkish Armenia (now Western Armenia) under the supervision of two European inspector generals.
- Oreste Zamor became the 24th President of Haiti after he and his brother Charles ousted president Michel Oreste from office in January. His term would be "short and extremely chaotic," ending on October 29.
- German ballooner Hans Berliner, along with two companions, flew a record 3,053 km (1,896 statute miles) over three days in a free balloon from Bitterfeld, Germany to Perm, Russia.
- The Luxembourg national football team had its first victory, beating France 5–4 in a friendly match, for the first and only time in football history.
- Austrian figure skater Fritz Kachler won the gold medal in the European Figure Skating Championships in Vienna.
- The 12-minute animated film Gertie the Dinosaur by Winsor McCay was released. Considered the first animated film produced, the film featured a prehistoric animal that performed tricks under the direction of a human named McCay. The film was part of McCay's live vaudeville act, but within a month the act was halted by news publisher William Randolph Hearst since McCay's touring schedule came in conflict with his illustrating contract with one of the newspapers Hearst owned. The animated film would be marketed later in the year by film producer William Fox.
- Born: Bill Finger, American comic book artist, noted for his collaboration with Bob Kane on Batman and Green Lantern; as Milton Finger, in Denver, United States (d. 1974)

== February 9, 1914 (Monday) ==
- Bernardino Machado took over as Prime Minister of Portugal after Afonso Costa.
- Lieutenant Henry Post of the U.S. Army Signal Corps plunged to his death in San Diego Bay after the right wing of his Wright Model C airplane crumpled, shortly after reaching a record altitude of 12,120 feet (3,694 metres).
- The New York Times reported that playwright J. M. Barrie – creator of Peter Pan – confidentially donated $50,000 (about £10,000) to polar explorer Ernest Shackleton's proposed Imperial Trans-Antarctic Expedition.
- The Abitibi Power and Paper Company, a Quebec forest products business, was incorporated under the Dominion Companies Act, in order to raise adequate capital for its plant and operations and to transfer its head office to Montreal.
- The Pantages Playhouse Theatre officially opened in Winnipeg as a vaudevillian theater, and would host famous guests including Harry Houdini, Laurel and Hardy and Buster Keaton. The theater was eventually purchased by the city after its last vaudeville show in 1923 where it would be home to the Royal Winnipeg Ballet until 1967. The theater was restored in recent years and continues to be a live event venue in Winnipeg.
- Born:
  - Ernest Tubb, American country singer and songwriter, known for songs such as "Blue Christmas" and "Walking the Floor Over You"; in Crisp, Texas, United States (d. 1984)
  - Thanat Khoman, Thai politician, Foreign Minister from 1959 to 1971 and Deputy Prime Minister from 1980 to 1982; in Bangkok, Siam (present-day Thailand) (d. 2016)
  - Bill Veeck, American sports executive, owner of the Cleveland Indians, St. Louis Browns and Chicago White Sox from 1946 to 1980; as William Veeck Jr., in Chicago, United States (d. 1986)
- Died: Bart van Hove, Dutch sculptor, sculpted the statue of St. Nicolas on top of the Basilica of Saint Nicholas in Amsterdam (b. 1850)

== February 10, 1914 (Tuesday) ==
- The cabinet under Swedish Prime Minister Karl Staaff resigned in light of King Gustaf refusing stop speaking out against the government's defense policy, even though it was in violation of Sweden's constitution: "I will not deprive myself the right to speak without restraint to the Swedish people."
- Colombia held the first direct presidential elections since 1860, José Vicente Concha of the Colombian Conservative Party winning in a landslide against Nicolás Esguerra of the Liberal-Republican Party with 89 per cent of the vote. He would take office of the President in August.
- Ongoing large-scale demonstrations in Tokyo against the Yamamoto Gonnohyōe administration turned violent, following weeks of news coverage of major corruption in the Japanese navy coinciding with news that naval expansion had eaten up most of the budget, resulting in proposed tax increases.
- Mary Pickford's name was displayed for the first time on movie marquees above the film's title for Hearts Adrift.
- British author Thomas Hardy, then 73, married his secretary Florence Dugdale, 39 years his junior, at St Andrew's, Enfield, England.
- Born:
  - Larry Adler, American musician, considered the world's most skilled harmonica player; as Lawrence Adler, in Baltimore, United States (d. 2001)
  - Bob Lilley, British commando, founding member of the British Special Air Service; as Ernest Thomas Lilley, in Wolverhampton, England (d. 1981)

== February 11, 1914 (Wednesday) ==
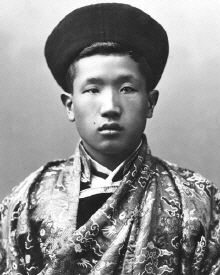
Sidkeong Tulku Namgyal, ruler of Sikkim

- Sidkeong Tulku Namgyal became Maharaja (Sanskrit for "high king") for the kingdom of Sikkim (now a state in modern India) after his father Thutob Namgyal died, but only after he was recognized as the reincarnation of his uncle Maharaja Sidkeong Namgyal by the abbot of Phodong Monastery.
- The British tanker SS San Wilfrido was launched by Armstrong, Whitworth & Co Ltd, Low Walker in the Low Walker Yard. The ship was operated by Eagle Oil Transport Co Ltd. and was sunk barely four months later by a German U-boat one day before Britain officially entered World War I.
- The Katsuyama Eiheiji Line opened in Fukui Prefecture, Japan, with stations Shin-Fukui, Fukuiguchi, Fujishima, Shimabashi, Ichiarakawa, Kannonmachi, Matsuoka, Shiizakai, Eiheijiguchi, Kōmyōji, Domeki, Sannō, Kobunato, Hossaka, Katsuyama and Mimata opened to serve the line.
- The first large power plant in the Ottoman Empire – the Silahtarağa Power Station – began generation in Istanbul. The coal-firing generation station remained in operation until 1983, when the plant was shut down. After sitting derelict for 20 years, the site was converted as a campus facility for the Istanbul Bilgi University.
- The second Sikorsky Ilya Muromets prototype took off for its first demonstration flight and set a load-to-altitude record, lifting 16 passengers aboard to 2,000 metres (6,562 ft).
- German aviator Bruno Langer attempted to break the flight endurance record Karl Ingold days earlier while flying an LFG Roland Pfeilflieger biplane, but fell 20 minutes short and landed at Kreuz, Germany after 16 continuous hours in the air.
- World Baseball Tour – Exhibition games between the New York Giants and Chicago White Sox in Italy were cancelled due to heavy rain, allowing members from both teams – with most of them identifying themselves as Catholic – to meet with Pope Pius X.
- Born:
  - Hans Hermann Junge, German SS officer, special aide to Adolf Hitler; in Preetz, German Empire (present-day Germany) (killed in combat, 1944)
  - Luigi Durand de la Penne, Italian naval diver, took part in human torpedo attacks on HMS Valiant during World War II; in Genoa, Kingdom of Italy (present-day Italy) (d. 1992)
  - Josh White, American blues musician, noted promoter of the Piedmont blues and country blues genres; as Joshua White, in Greenville, South Carolina, United States (d. 1969)
- Died: Alexander Ross Clarke, British geographer and mathematician, best known for the Principal Triangulation of Great Britain and the Figure of the Earth (b. 1828)

== February 12, 1914 (Thursday) ==
- Tsar Nicholas called Ivan Goremykin back into service to form a cabinet and again sit as Chairman of the Government of the Russian Federation (a sort of prime ministerial position), replacing Vladimir Kokovtsov.
- Former Kentucky Senator Joseph Clay Stiles Blackburn turned the first sod at a dedication ceremony on the future site of the Lincoln Memorial in Washington, D.C. "The memorial will show that (President Abraham) Lincoln is now regarded as the greatest of all Americans," Blackburn said in his speech at the ceremony, which was only attended by a small group of dignitaries.
- The silent western The Squaw Man starring Dustin Farnum and directed by Cecil B. DeMille and Oscar Apfel was released. The movie would become the second-highest grossing release in 1914 at $244,700. DeMille would remake the film two more times, in 1918 and finally in 1931.
- Born: Tex Beneke, American bandleader, famous for collaborations with Glenn Miller including "In the Mood"; as Gordon Lee Beneke, in Fort Worth, Texas, United States (d. 2000)
- Died: Augustus Jessopp, English cleric and writer, major contributor to The Nineteenth Century (b. 1823)

== February 13, 1914 (Friday) ==
- American composer Victor Herbert formed the American Society of Composers, Authors and Publishers at the Hotel Claridge in New York City to protect the copyrighted musical compositions of its members, which would include such musical artists as Irving Berlin, Otto Harbach, James Weldon Johnson, Jerome Kern and John Philip Sousa.
- Five men were killed in an explosion while packing explosive powder at a warehouse in Kenvil, New Jersey.
- Rancher Clemente Vergara, of Laredo, Texas, was taken into custody by Mexican federal troops on the Rio Grande river. Vergara had filed complaints to the Webb County sheriff over allegations of Mexican federal troops stealing horses he allowed to graze on the banks on either side of the river that bordered the United States with Mexico. Vergara had arranged to meet with the commanding officer of a garrison in Hidalgo, Coahuila, on the Mexican side of the river to discuss the matter. His nephew, who accompanied Vergara to the meeting, witnessed five soldiers ambushing Vergara as he crossed the river on a skiff, knocking him out and carrying him away as the youth escaped.
- Died: Alphonse Bertillon, French police investigator and forensics pioneer who applied anthropometry to crime investigation (b. 1853)

== February 14, 1914 (Saturday) ==
- More riots broke out in Tokyo over protests against tax increases, in part caused by the burgeoning naval expansion budget and major corruption allegations that resulted in the Imperial Japanese Navy dismissing several officers.
- The tugboat USS Potomac was iced in during a rescue mission for other entrapped fishing vessels off the coast of Newfoundland.
- Iona College opened as an all-girls preparatory school in Hawke's Bay, New Zealand.
- Babe Ruth signed his first Minor League Baseball Contract with the Baltimore Orioles.
- The first court sessions was held in the new Oregon Supreme Court Building in Salem, Oregon.
- Born:
  - Norman Von Nida, Australian professional golfer, winner of the 1948 British Masters; in Strathfield, New South Wales, Australia (d. 2007)
  - Nancy Harkness Love, American Air Force pilot, first commander of the Women Airforce Service Pilots, recipient of the Air Medal; in Houghton, Michigan, United States (d. 1976)
- Died: Augustus Octavius Bacon, U.S. Senator from Georgia from 1895 to 1914 (b. 1839)

== February 15, 1914 (Sunday) ==
- Norwegian speedskater Oscar Mathisen won his fifth World Allround Speed Skating Championship at Frogner stadion in Oslo.
- The Uruguayan football association club Sud América was formed near Montevideo.
- Born:
  - Kevin McCarthy, American actor, best known for leading roles in Invasion of the Body Snatchers and Death of a Salesman; in Seattle, United States (d. 2010)
  - Hale Boggs, American politician, U.S. Representative from Louisiana from 1947 to 1973, House Majority Leader from 1971 to 1973, member of the Warren Commission; as Thomas Hale Boggs, in Long Beach, Mississippi, United States (presumedly killed in plane crash, 1972)
- Died:
  - Roswell Park, American surgeon, founder of the Gratwick Research Laboratory (now Roswell Park Comprehensive Cancer Center), operated on mortally wounded U.S. President William McKinley following his assassination (b. 1852)
  - Juan Pedro Aladro Kastriota, Albanian noble, pretender to the throne of Albania (b. 1845)
  - Kate Brownlee Sherwood, American poet and journalist, founder of the Woman's Relief Corps (b. 1841)

== February 16, 1914 (Monday) ==
- World Baseball Tour – During the exhibition game in front of 5,000 spectators in Nice, France, the New York Giants led the Chicago White Sox 7–3 in the fourth inning, but a ninth inning rally helped the Sox squeak a 10–9 win over the Giants.
- Born: Jimmy Wakely, American country-western singer and actor, known for songs such as "Signed Sealed and Delivered"; as James Wakely, in Howard County, Arkansas, United States (d. 1982)
- Died:
  - Maria Maximilianovna, Russian noble, eldest daughter of Maximilian de Beauharnais and Maria Nikolaevna (b. 1841)
  - Aoki Shūzō, Japanese diplomat, served as Foreign Minister in Meiji Japan (b. 1844)

== February 17, 1914 (Tuesday) ==
- Karl Staaff stepped down as Prime Minister of Sweden in protest after Sweden's sitting monarch King Gustaf publicly denounced the Staaff administration's defense policies during a peasant armament support march at the Royal castle's court in Stockholm, in what became known as the Courtyard Crisis. The King's public remarks violated Sweden's constitution where the monarchy was not to interfere with politics. Hjalmar Hammarskjöld, county governor of Uppsala, took over as head of non-parliamentarian government.
- The American barquentine W. H. Dimond ran aground on Bird Island, Alaska while carrying general cargo from San Francisco to Unga Island for Alaska Codfish Co.
- The Georgia Supreme Court denied convicted murderer Leo Frank a new trial by a 4–2 vote.
- The Sopwith Sociable airplane was given its first test flight at Brookside, Telford, England, before it was delivered to Hendon two days later.
- The first smørrebrød shop opened in Copenhagen.
- Born: Julia de Burgos, Puerto Rican poet and activist, known for works including El Rio Grande de Loiza, advocated for Puerto Rico independence; as Julia Burgos García, in Carolina, Puerto Rico (d. 1953)

== February 18, 1914 (Wednesday) ==
- Pancho Villa insured his life for $500,000 as a favor of his wife ahead of his plans to lay siege to Torreón.
- Born:
  - Jan Nisar Akhtar, Indian poet of Urdu, member of the Progressive Writers' Movement; in Gwalior, British India (present-day India) (d. 1976)
  - Pee Wee King, country musician, best known for co-writing "Tennessee Waltz"; as Julius Frank Anthony Kuczynski, in Abrams, Wisconsin, United States (d. 2000)
  - Ferdinand J. Chesarek, American army general, commanding officer for artillery divisions in World War II and the Korean War; in Calumet, Michigan, United States (d. 1993)
- Died: Fanny Stevenson, American writer, wife to novelist Robert Louis Stevenson (b. 1840)

== February 19, 1914 (Thursday) ==
- Torrential rain in Southern California caused massive flooding in seven counties, killing two people and causing damages estimated between $500,000 and $1 million US.
- Canadian Arctic Expedition – Robert Bartlett, captain of the sunken polar exploration ship Karluk, completed plans to disband "Shipwreck Camp" that sat on ice floes in the Beaufort Sea and move the remaining expedition crew to Wrangel Island 40 miles (64 km) west. Bartlett had sent out scouts to blaze a trail, set up supply depots along the way, and prepare a camp site on the island for his team, many of whom were inexperienced with ice travel.
- The Times Literary Supplement was published separately for the first time (in London).
- The opera Francesca da Rimini by Italian composer Riccardo Zandonai premiered at the Teatro Regio in Turin, Italy.
- Died: Tom Jeffords, American army scout, noted for his partnership with Apache leader Cochise in ending the Apache Wars (b. 1832)

== February 20, 1914 (Friday) ==
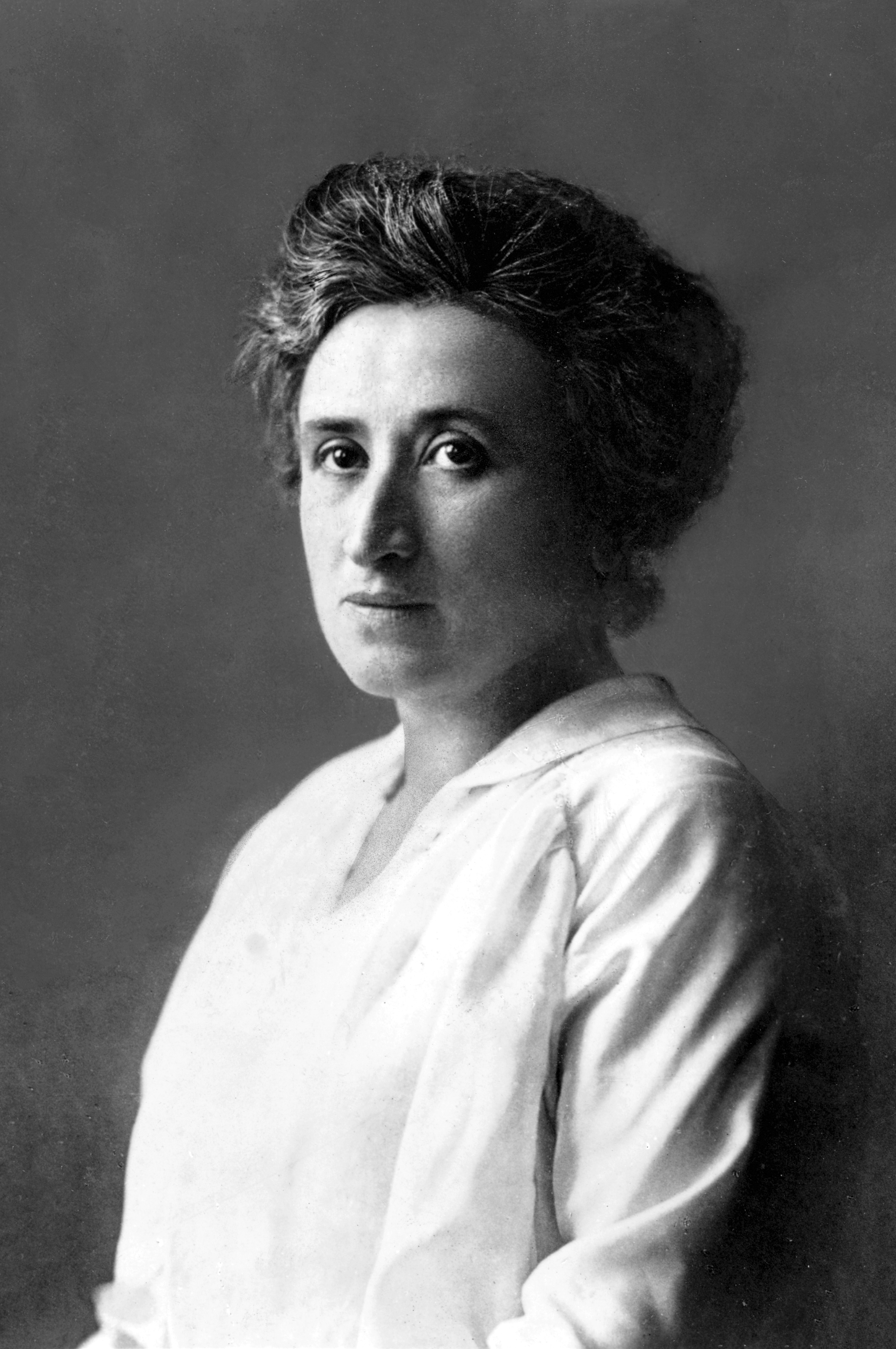
Rosa Luxemburg

- German socialist activist Rosa Luxemburg stood on trial at the Frankfurt Criminal Court on charges of encouraging public disobedience stemming from anti-war speeches she made across Germany. During the trial, Luxemburg declared, "When, as I say, the majority of people come to the conclusion that wars are nothing but a barbaric, unsocial, reactionary phenomenon, entirely against the interests of the people, then wars will have become impossible." She was sentenced to one year in prison, which she served during the second year of World War I.
- British rancher William S. Benton, who owned land in Chihuahua under control of Mexican revolutionary Pancho Villa, was reported executed by firing squad in Juarez following a court martial where he was convicted of making an attempt on the revolutionary leader's life. However, friends and acquaintances of Benton claimed he had never taken sides in the Mexican Revolution nor had any motivation to harm Villa.
- James William Humphrys Scotland made the first substantial cross-country flight in New Zealand. He flew from Invercargill to Gore, a distance of 61 kilometres (38 mi), in 40 minutes in a Caudron biplane. He continued on to Dunedin, Timaru and Christchurch where he arrived on 6 March.
- The Fethard-on-Sea life-boat capsized on service off the cost of County Wexford, Ireland, with nine men lost.
- Winston Churchill, First Lord of the Admiralty, flew as a passenger in a Sopwith Sociable airplane at Hendon, England, three days after the aircraft's test flight.
- The Jōhana railroad was extended in Toyama Prefecture, Japan, with stations Takaoka, Futatsuka, Toide, Aburaden, Demachi, Takagi, Fukuno, and Jōhana serving the line.
- The Norwegian sports club Rollon was formed in Ålesund, Norway, and remains the oldest sports club in the city to offer association football.
- The village of Legal, Alberta was established.
- Born:
  - Peter Rogers, British film-maker, producer of the Carry On series; in Rochester, Kent, England (d. 2009)
  - John Charles Daly, American television personality, host of What's My Line?; in Johannesburg, South Africa (d. 1991)
  - Joey Archibald, American boxer, world featherweight champion in 1938 to 1941; as Joseph Archibald, in Providence, Rhode Island, United States (d. 1998)
- Died:
  - Federico Degetau, Puerto Rican politician, first Resident Commissioner of Puerto Rico from 1901 to 1905 (b. 1862)
  - Dev Shumsher Jang Bahadur Rana, Nepalese state leader, 12th Prime Minister of Nepal (b. 1862)

== February 21, 1914 (Saturday) ==
- The Principality of Albania was formally established to be ruled under Prince William, ending about two years of Albanian independence.
- Tsar Nicholas concluded a special conference of military and other advisers to discuss the possibility of the Bosporus and the Dardanelles straits being forced open to allow the Imperial Russian Navy to leave the Black Sea if needed during military conflict, contrary to the Treaty of Berlin in 1878 that banned Russia from sending warships through the Dardanelles, even in times of peace.
- Imperial German Navy battleship SMS Kronprinz was launched in Kiel, Germany. It would serve all of World War I before it was scuttled in 1919 in Scapa Flow along with other German navy vessels.
- Bai Lang Rebellion – Rebel troops under command of Bai Lang, known as the "White Wolf" attacked Zhanjiang, China.
- While imprisoned in Calton Jail, Edinburgh for attempted fire-raising, suffragette Ethel Moorhead became the first in Scotland to suffer force-feeding while on hunger strike; she was released four days on health grounds.
- Turkish bank Milli Aydın was established in Aydın, Turkey.
- Born:
  - Arnold Denker, American Grandmaster chess player, U.S. Chess Champion in 1945 and 1946; in New York City, United States (d. 2005)
  - Zachary Scott, American actor, best known for film roles such as Mildred Pierce; in Austin, Texas, United States (d. 1965)
  - Juliette Hampton Morgan, American librarian and activist, known for her letter-writing campaign to the Montgomery Advertiser supporting civil rights; in Montgomery, Alabama, United States (suicide, 1957)
  - Jean Tatlock, American physician, noted for her relationship with J. Robert Oppenheimer and investigation into her membership with Communist Party USA; in Ann Arbor, Michigan, United States (suicide, 1944)
- Died: Joseph William Sutton, Australian shipbuilder and inventor, founder of the J. W. Sutton and Company shipbuilding and engineering works in Sydney (b. 1844)

== February 22, 1914 (Sunday) ==
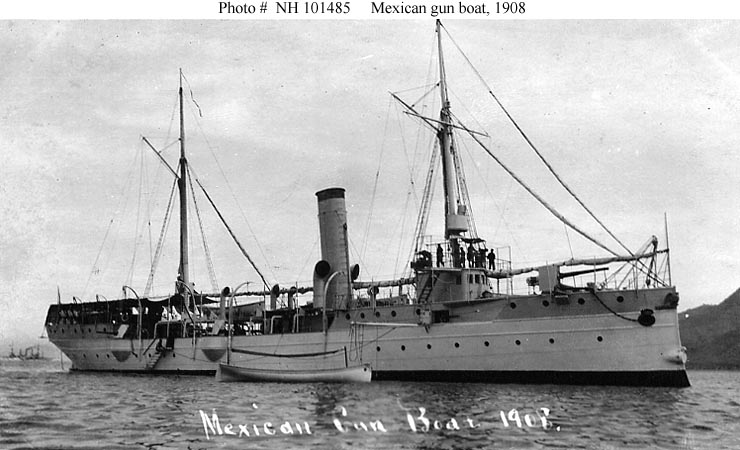
Mexican Navy gunboat Tampico

- Executive Officer Lieutenant Hilario Rodríguez Malpica and three other officers lead a mutiny on the Mexican Navy gunboat Tampico while it was refitting for a cruise off Guaymas, Mexico. The mutinous crew arrested Captain Manuel Azueta, who was informed the Tampico would set sail to join up with rebel forces in the region. A nearby gunboat tried to intercept the Tampico but Malpica order his ship to steam straight at the opposing vessel, hoping to ram and sink her. The gunboat's steering gear malfunctioned and Tampico was forced to turn and head to Topolobampo, where Azueta was transferred to a merchant vessel.
- Arctic explorer Robert Peary was awarded honorary membership to the Geographical Society of St. Gall in Switzerland for his accomplishments in polar exploration.
- World Figure Skating Championships – Swedish figure skater Gösta Sandahl won gold in the men's competition.
- Born:
  - Renato Dulbecco, Italian virologist, recipient of the 1975 Nobel Prize in Physiology or Medicine; in Catanzaro, Kingdom of Italy (present-day Italy) (d. 2012)
  - Karl Otto Götz, German painter, part of the Tachisme abstract painters of the 1940s and 1950s; in Aachen, German Empire (present-day Germany) (d. 2017)
- Died: Mariano Trías, Filipino politician, first Vice President of the Philippines (b. 1868)

== February 23, 1914 (Monday) ==
- Parliamentary elections were held in Bulgaria, with the Liberal Concentration, an alliance of the Liberal Party, the People's Liberal Party and the Young Liberals Party, winning 126 of the 245 parliament seats.
- Mexican revolutionary leader Pancho Villa told news media that his alleged altercation with British rancher William S. Benton was not fatal. Villa said Benton had quarreled with him in his private quarters in Juarez then reached for what Villa alleged was a pistol in his hip pocket. Villa said he had thrust his own pistol into Benton's belly but did not fire his weapon, instead turning the man over to his guards. The official report maintained Benton was tried by court-martial and executed for making an attempt on Villa's life.
- Royal Navy cruiser HMS Cordelia was launched at Pembroke Dockyard and would serve in World War I and the Irish Civil War.
- The Bristol Scout airplane completed its first test flight at Larkhill, England.
- The opera Cléopâtre by Jules Massenet premiered at the Opéra de Monte-Carlo in Monaco, two years after the French composer's death.
- Died: Henry M. Teller, American politician, 15th United States Secretary of the Interior, U.S. Senator from Colorado from 1876 till 1882 and from 1885 till 1909 (b. 1830)

== February 24, 1914 (Tuesday) ==
- Mexican revolutionary leader Pancho Villa refused to deliver the body of British rancher William S. Benton, who had been killed in Juarez Mexico while in Villa's custody, to U.S. and British authorities, but would allow relatives to visit the burial site under escort. Speculation ran that Villa shot Benton during a scuffle and was refusing to exhume the body as it would reveal forensic evidence connecting Benton's death to him.
- Ulster Unionist Party leader Edward Carson distributed posters throughout Ulster, Ireland to address public concerns about the Ulster Volunteer Force, a unionist militia formed in January, 1913 by the party based in the Ulster province to help the region resist Home Rule in Dublin: "Our quarrel is with the Government alone, and we desire that the Religious and Political views of our opponents should be everywhere respected."
- Canadian Arctic Expedition – Captain Robert Bartlett led the last survivors from "Shipwreck Camp" to Wrangel Island, leaving a note of the party's location in a copper drum in case the campsite drifted into an inhabited area. Unknown that the ship had sunk, famed polar explorer Robert Peary speculated to The New York Times that the Karluk had set up a winter camp near the Alaskan Arctic coastline.
- The Boat Mail ferry-rail service began operating between the Indian port of Madras and Colombo.
- The Pamban Bridge opened in Rameswaram, India, as the country's first sea bridge and its longest until the Bandra–Worli Sea Link opened in 2010.
- Born:
  - Weldon Kees, American writer, author of collected works including Fall Quarter; as Harry Weldon Kees, in Beatrice, Nebraska, United States (disappeared, 1955)
  - Ralph Erskine, British-born architect who primarily worked in Sweden; best known for The Ark; in London, England (d. 2005)
  - Irwin Abrams, history professor of Antioch College, author of The Nobel Peace Prize and the Laureates, considered the authoritative reference work to the Nobel Prize; in San Francisco, United States (d. 2010)
- Died:
  - Joshua Chamberlain, American army officer, awarded the Medal of Honor for his command during the Battle of Gettysburg (b. 1828)
  - Francis I. McKenna, American real estate and land developer, major civic developer and advocate for Portland, Oregon (b. 1859)

== February 25, 1914 (Wednesday) ==
- The British destroyer HMS Lance was launched from shipyards owned by John I. Thornycroft & Company in Woolston, Southampton, England.
- The White House Correspondents' Association was founded by journalists in response to an unfounded rumor that a congressional committee would select which journalists could attend press conferences of President Woodrow Wilson.
- Investigations by Texas state officials confirmed rancher Clemente Vergara was dead, with witnesses reporting he had been hanged by Mexican soldiers in Hidalgo, Coahuila, Mexico as early as February 15. Vergara was missing since his wife and daughter found him injured from a beating in Mexican community's garrison on February 14. It took several more weeks before his body was recovered and transported stateside to family in Laredo, Texas.
- Snack food manufacturer Tasty Baking Company was established in Philadelphia, eventually evolving to become Tastykake.
- An annular solar eclipse covered most of the Antarctic and could be observed in New Zealand.
- Born:
  - John Arlott, English poet and cricket commentator for BBC's Test Match Special, author Of Period and Place; as Leslie Thomas John Arlott, in Basingstoke, England (d. 1991)
  - James Cameron, American civil rights activist, founder of the America's Black Holocaust Museum; in La Crosse, Wisconsin, United States (d. 2006)
  - Alan Marre, British civil servant, first Parliamentary and Health Service Ombudsman of England (d. 1990)
- Died: John Tenniel, English illustrator associated with Lewis Carroll (b. 1820)

== February 26, 1914 (Thursday) ==
- Texas Governor Oscar Branch Colquitt implied in a telegram to United States Secretary of State William Jennings Bryan Texas Rangers on the U.S.-Mexico border could cross and retrieve the body of Texas rancher Clemente Vergara, who had been reportedly hanged (later confirmed shot) by Mexican federal soldiers on February 15. The U.S. Government responded such an act would constitute an act of war and refused the governor's request.
- The ocean liner that would become HMHS Britannic, sister to the RMS Titanic, was launched at the Harland and Wolff shipyards in Belfast.
- The British destroyer HMS Lydiard was launched at the Fairfield Shipbuilding and Engineering Company. The naval ship would later be credited with torpedoing the German light cruiser SMS Mainz at the Battle of Heligoland Bight during the first month of World War I.
- World Baseball Tour – At the 46th and final game between the globetrotting New York Giants and the Chicago White Sox in London, a record 20,000 to 35,000 spectators attended (based on word King George V was attending) and witnessed the White Sox slaying the Giants 5–4 in 11 innings. Since the start of the tour in October back in the United States, the Giants and White Sox played 46 games, with the White Sox winning 24, the Giants winning 20, with only two games ending in ties.
- Sixteen passengers and a pilot flew 18 minutes on an "omnibus" developed by aviation engineer Igor Sikorsky in Saint Petersburg. The aircraft was the Ilya Muromets, a four-engine biplane with an enclosed, heated passenger cabin and accommodation for eating and sleeping. Although it may initially have been intended for civilian use, it was subsequently developed for military service and became the basis of the first four-engine bombers used in the First World War. The aeroplane had an enclosed, lighted and heated cabin for passengers' comfort.
- A reconstituted Detroit Symphony Orchestra made their first performance in the Detroit Opera House.
- Hotel Victoria in officially closed its doors in New York City to make way for new office development.
- Born:
  - Victor Khain, Russian geologist, academician of USSR Academy of Sciences; in Baku, Russian Empire (present-day Azerbaijan) (d. 2009)
  - Malcolm Wilson, American politician, 50th Governor of New York; as Charles Malcolm Wilson, in New York City, United States (d. 2000)
  - William Stratton, American politician, 32nd Governor of Illinois; in Ingleside, Illinois, United States (d. 2001)
  - Robert Alda, American actor, father to Alan Alda, known for playing George Gershwin in Rhapsody in Blue; as Alfonso Giuseppe Giovanni Roberto D'Bruzzo, in New York City, United States (d. 1986)
  - Caesar Hull, British air force officer, commander of the No. 43 Squadron during World War II, recipient of the Distinguished Flying Cross; in Shangani, Rhodesia (present-day Zimbabwe) (killed in action, 1940)
- Died: Zhao Bingjun, Chinese state leader, third Premier of the Republic of China (assassinated) (b. 1859)

== February 27, 1914 (Friday) ==
- Mexican president Victoriano Huerta promised to investigate the death of Texan rancher Clemente Vergara while in custody at a federal garrison near Hidalgo, Mexico, following public pressure by United States Secretary of State William Jennings Bryan. At the same time, Bryan said the State Department would not entertain the idea of permitting Texas Rangers to cross the border into Mexico to arrest suspected federal soldiers who allegedly shot Vergara on February 15, despite a request by Texas governor Oscar Branch Colquitt (who retracted in a statement to the press the same day).
- Roosevelt–Rondon Scientific Expedition – Former U.S. President Theodore Roosevelt and Brazilian explorer Cândido Rondon and their expedition team reached Caceres, Brazil, to begin exploration of the Rio da Dúvida (River of Doubt, later renamed Roosevelt River), a 400-mile (640 km) river that winded deep into the Amazon rainforest, then unseen by non-indigenous peoples. The 58-day expedition would prove grueling for all participants, resulting in three deaths before the team reached the mouth of the river in late April.
- The Huntingdonshire Cyclist Battalion of the British Army was established in Huntingdon, England.
- Italian racer Ralph DePalma won the 9th Vanderbilt Cup at Santa Monica, California, driving a Mercedes GP.
- Bohemia beat host country Germany 2–0 to win the European Hockey Championship in Berlin, with Czech player Jaroslav Jirkovský scoring the most goals (seven in total) during the three-day tournament.
- The comedic operetta Szibill by Hungarian composer Victor Jacobi debuted at the Király Színház (King's Theatre) in Budapest.

== February 28, 1914 (Saturday) ==
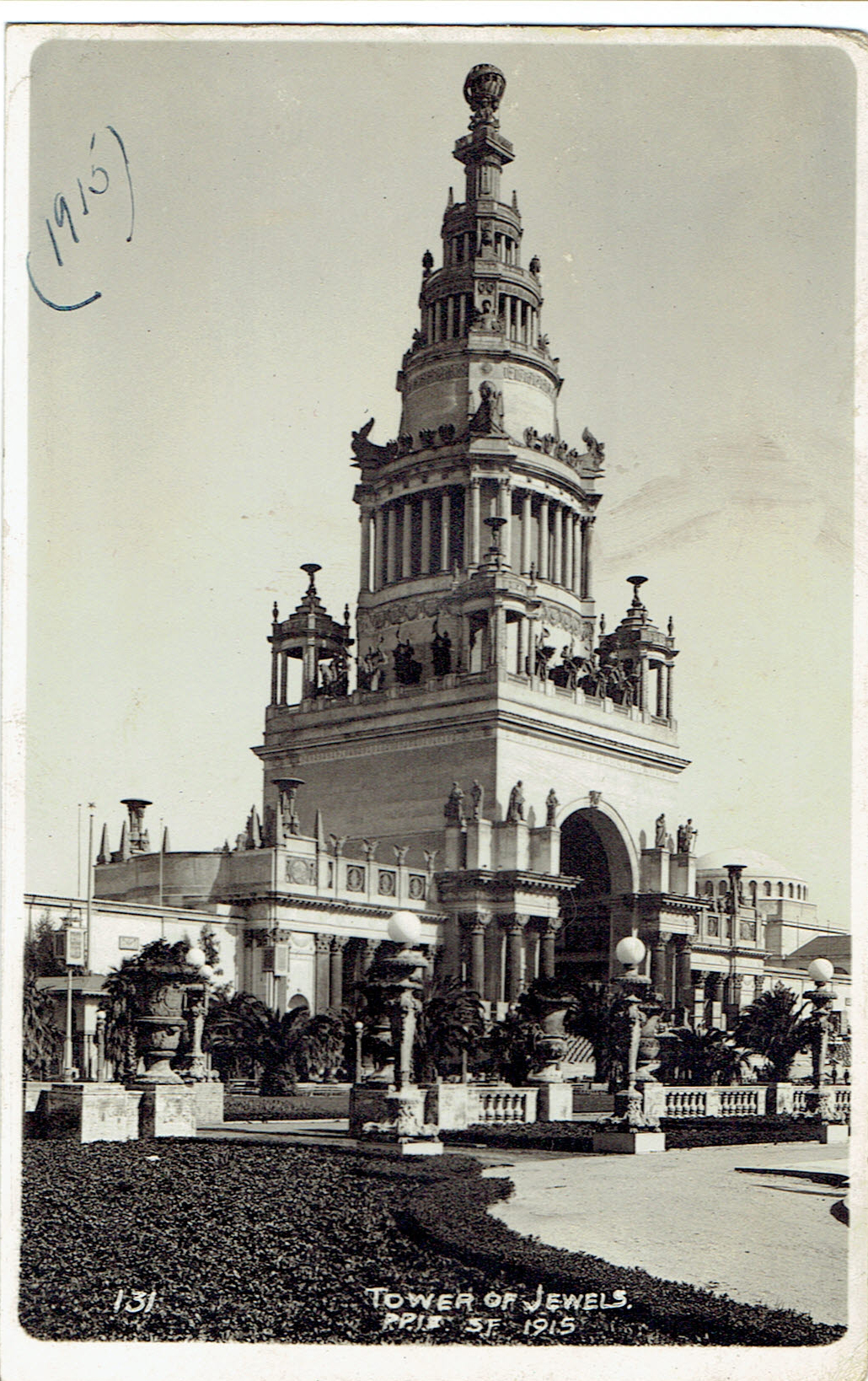
The Tower of Jewels

- A declaration of independence for the Autonomous Republic of Northern Epirus was proclaimed by ethnic Greeks in Northern Epirus.
- Bandit soldiers associated with Bai Yung-chang, commonly referred to as Bai Lang or the "White Wolf" in the press, eluded soldiers under command of General Taun Chi-Jui following a defeat at the Honan-Anhui border in China.
- An "official" report released by the British government reported there was sufficient forensic evidence to conclude British rancher William S. Benton had been shot and killed in Pancho Villa's office and not in front of a firing squad as originally stated.
- Canadian Arctic Expedition – All ice-trekking groups from the shipwrecked Karluk polar ship rendezvoused on the open ice for a 130 km (80 miles) march to Wrangel Island, located in the Arctic Ocean. High ridges of ice measuring 25 to 100 feet (7.6 to 30.5 m) in height halted their progress. Three members returned to Shipwreck Camp to pick up more supplies while the rest chopped and cut a pathway through the towering ridges. When both groups reunited a week later, the path had only advanced forward by three miles (5 km). However, the worst of the ridges were behind them and the group was able to reach land by March.
- Royal Navy destroyer HMS Laverock ran aground off the coast of west England but was refloated a month later.
- Construction began on the Tower of Jewels for the Panama–Pacific International Exposition in San Francisco. The combination triumphal arch-and-tower would eventually stand 435 feet (132.59 m) tall, and be covered with more than 100,000 cut glass pieces that would sparkle in the sunlight, giving its signature name.
- Formed by city council, the Cape Town Philharmonic Orchestra held its inaugural performance at City Hall in Cape Town.
- American racer Eddie Pullen won the 5th American Grand Prize at Santa Monica, California, with over 648.934 km (13.519 km x 48 laps) completed in 5 hours, 13 minutes, 30 seconds while driving a Mercer 35-R.
- The German football association club Wissen was formed in Wissen, Germany.
- Born: Mirosław Iringh, Polish military officer, participated in the Warsaw Uprising during World War II, in Warsaw (d. 1985)
- Died: Sebhat Aregawi, Ras of Ethiopia from 1892 to 1914 (assassinated) (date of birth unknown)
