= List of shipwrecks in February 1914 =

The list of shipwrecks in February 1914 includes ships sunk, foundered, grounded, or otherwise lost during February 1914.

== 1 February ==
List of shipwrecks: 1 February 1914
Ship	State	Description
Duncan	United Kingdom	The 114.8-foot (35.0 m), 216-ton steam trawler was wrecked on St. Patricks causeway, Pwllheli in Cardigan Bay and was declared a constructive total loss.

== 3 February ==
List of shipwrecks: 3 February 1914
Ship	State	Description
Biessard	France	The barque departed Le Havre, Seine-Inférieure for Tchio, New Caledonia. No further trace, presumed foundered with the loss of all hands.
Snipe	United Kingdom	The cutter foundered in the Thames Estuary 3.5 nautical miles (6.5 km) of the Gunfleet Lighthouse with the loss of a crew member.
W. H. Dimond	United States	While the 390-gross register ton, 155-foot (47 m) cod fishing schooner was anchored off Bird Island in the Shumagin Islands during a voyage from San Francisco, California, to Unga, Territory of Alaska, with 12 fishermen, a 500-ton cargo consisting of a 26-foot (7.9 m) boat, general merchandise, coal, and salt, and a crew of 10 aboard, a storm with hurricane-force winds struck. Her anchor cables broke and she was stranded on rocks. There was no loss of life, but by the following morning she had been dashed to pieces, leaving behind only wood, pieces of timber, and provisions that washed ashore.

== 5 February ==
List of shipwrecks: 5 February 1914
Ship	State	Description
Camberwarra	Netherlands	The self-propelled floating crane struck a rock and sank in the Indian Ocean 10.8 miles (17.4 km) southwest of Green Head, Western Australia, with no loss of life.

== 6 February ==
List of shipwrecks: 6 February 1914
Ship	State	Description
Helen H. Benedict	United States	The schooner ran aground in thick fog strong winds and high seas 2 1/2 miles (4.0 km) south south east of the Nags Head Life Saving Station, a total loss. Her crew was rescued by the United States Life Saving Service.

== 7 February ==
List of shipwrecks: 7 February 1914
Ship	State	Description
Queen Louise	United Kingdom	The steamer ran aground in thick fog and rain north of the Squan Beach Life-Saving Station, New Jersey. She refloated on her own with no damage on 10 February.

== 9 February ==
List of shipwrecks: 9 February 1914
Ship	State	Description
Elmer D. Walling	United States	The canal boat sank at Noank, Connecticut.

== 10 February ==
List of shipwrecks: 10 February 1914
Ship	State	Description
Queen City	United States	The packet struck a rock and sank at the top of the waterfalls at Louisville, Kentucky saving her from going over the falls after losing steering control in strong current. Her 70 crew and 125 passengers were rescued by the United States Life Saving Service. Her cargo was lightered, she was pumped out and pulled off on 1 March.

== 11 February ==
List of shipwrecks: 11 February 1914
Ship	State	Description
Harriet	United States	The tug struck rocks in the Mystic River near Groton Long Point, Connecticut.

== 12 February ==
List of shipwrecks: 12 February 1914
Ship	State	Description
Arnside	United Kingdom	The coaster foundered in the Atlantic Ocean off Land's End, Cornwall with the loss of all twelve of her crew.
Dolphin	United States	The 16-gross register ton, 45-foot (13.7 m) fishing steamer sank at a location identified in the wreck report as "Active Pass, Alaska," probably a mistaken reference to Active Pass in British Columbia, Canada. All three people aboard survived.
Liniers	United Kingdom	The tug was driven ashore at Dungeness, Kent and wrecked. Her crew survived.
Miown	United Kingdom	The coaster foundered in the English Channel 2 nautical miles (3.7 km) off Shoreham-by-Sea, Sussex with the loss of eight of her nine crew.

== 14 February ==
List of shipwrecks: 14 February 1914
Ship	State	Description
Dom Pedro II	United States	The schooner was wrecked/foundered on tail of the horseshoe 6 1/2 miles (10.5 km) east of Thimble Shoal Light. The wreck was destroyed by USRC Onondaga ( United States Revenue Marine).
Gem	United States	The steamer caught fire in the Mississippi River and was beached near Hahnville, Louisiana and was destroyed by the fire. Five crew and one or two passengers were killed.

== 17 February ==
List of shipwrecks: 17 February 1914
Ship	State	Description
Castagna	Italy	The barque was wrecked in a snowstorm on Cape Cod 3 1/2 miles (5.6 km) south of the Cahoons Hollow Life-Saving Station, a total loss. Five people aboard froze to death and eight were rescued by the United States Life Saving Service.
John H. Hanson	United States	The schooner sprang a leak and was abandoned in the Atlantic Ocean whilst on a voyage from San Juan, Puerto Rico to Boston, Massachusetts.
Queen City	United States	The steamer was wrecked/sank at the Falls of the Ohio, Louisville, Kentucky.
W. H. Dimond	United States	The schooner foundered in the Pacific Ocean off the coast of Alaska.

== 18 February ==
List of shipwrecks: 18 February 1914
Ship	State	Description
Romeu	Brazil	The cargo ship foundered in a tributary of the Amazon River.

== 20 February ==
List of shipwrecks: 20 February 1914
Ship	State	Description
Mexico	Norway	The schooner was driven ashore and wrecked on the coast of the Keeragh Islands, United Kingdom on 20 February.
Riversdale	United Kingdom	The steamer ran aground in a snowstorm near the Little Island Life Saving Station, Virginia. Refloated by wreckers on 3 March. Her crew was rescued by the United States Life Saving Service.

== 22 February ==
List of shipwrecks: 22 February 1914
Ship	State	Description
Elizabeth Crouch	United Kingdom	The ketch foundered in the Bristol Channel. Her two crew were rescued by the cutter Dawn (United Kingdom).
Itucuman	Brazil	The coaster sank at Manaus.

== 23 February ==
List of shipwrecks: 23 February 1914
Ship	State	Description
Ekliptika	Denmark	The cargo ship foundered in the Bay of Biscay with the loss of twelve of the 23 people on board. The survivors were rescued by Wildenfels (Germany).

== 24 February ==
List of shipwrecks: 24 February 1914
Ship	State	Description
James H. Hogan	United States	The tugboat sank at Belle Dock in New Haven, Connecticut.

== 25 February ==
List of shipwrecks: 25 February 1914
Ship	State	Description
Kalxten	Russia	The schooner was driven ashore and wrecked at Casablanca, Morocco. Her crew were rescued.

== 26 February ==
List of shipwrecks: 26 February 1914
Ship	State	Description
Connie Castle	United Kingdom	Connie Castle The steamship ran aground.
Maria	Greece	The schooner was wrecked in the Mediterranean Sea off Hyères, Var, France.

== 27 February ==
List of shipwrecks: 27 February 1914
Ship	State	Description
S. G. Haskell	United States	The schooner foundered off the coast of Savannah, Georgia (30°01′N 74°00′W).

== 28 February ==
List of shipwrecks: 28 February 1914
Ship	State	Description
HMS Laverock	Royal Navy	The Laforey-class destroyer ran aground at Skelmorlie, Ayrshire. She was refloated on 30 March.
Nokomis	United States	The schooner was wrecked on Perton Island. Her crew were rescued.

== Unknown February ==
List of shipwrecks: unknown February 1914
Ship	State	Description
Clara Bella	United Kingdom	The 130.5-foot (39.8 m), trawler was last seen sheltering in Onundafjord, Iceland from storms on 10 February. Wasn't visible in a gap in storms later that day. Severe storms the next 10 days, but probably sunk with all hands in a snowstorm on 10 February.
