= Yoshihama Station =

Yoshihama Station (吉浜駅) is the name of two train stations in Japan:

- Yoshihama Station (Aichi)
- Yoshihama Station (Iwate)
