= 535th Slovak Platoon =

- Ensign
- Dates active: 1943 – 1944
- Active regions: Warsaw
- Part of: Armia Krajowa
- Wars: World War II

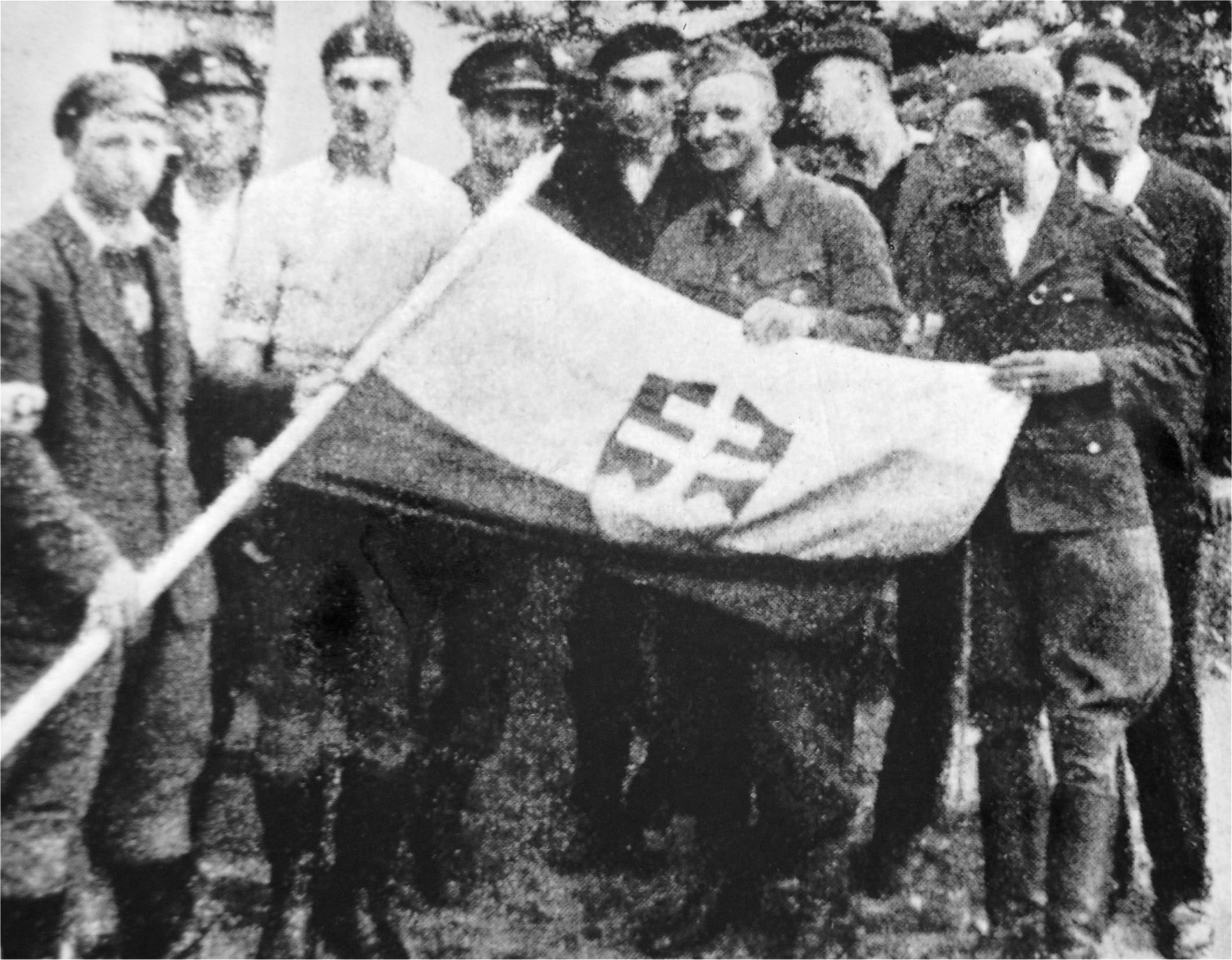
The Slovak Platoon in 1944

The 535th Slovak Platoon (Polish: 535 pluton Słowaków) was a unit under the command of the Polish Home Army (AK) which fought in the Warsaw Uprising as part of the 1st Company of Battalion "Tur", Group "Kryska", during World War II. It was commanded by lieutenant Mirosław Iringh ("Stanko").

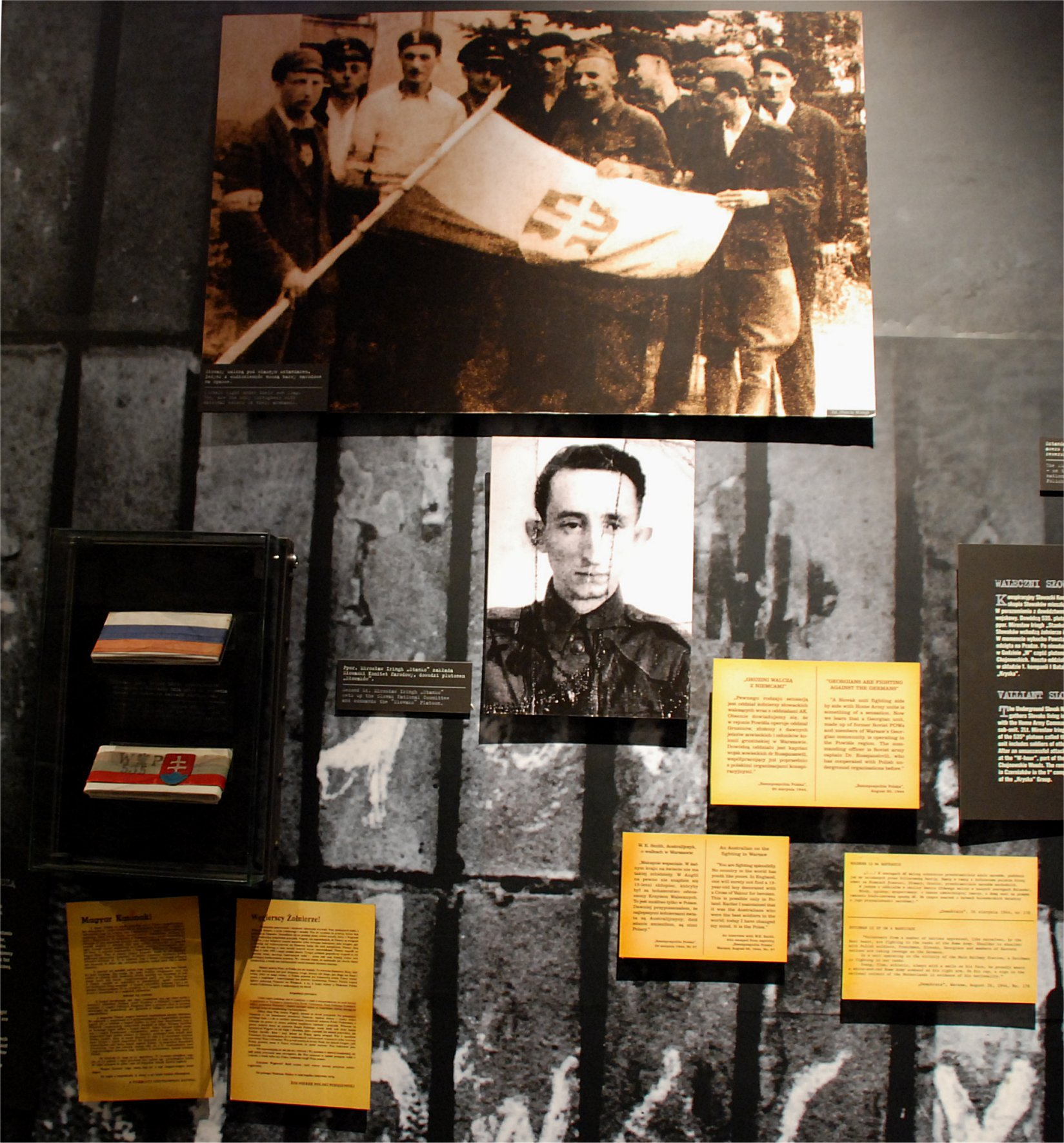
Fragment of the exhibit dedicated to the Platoon at the Warsaw Uprising Museum; bottom photograph Mirosław Iringh

== Formation ==
The unit was formed on the orders of the Underground Slovak National Council in 1943. Initially the unit had around 57 soldiers: 28 Slovaks, around 11 Poles, 6 Georgians, 4 French, 3 Hungarians, 2 Armenians, 1 Ukrainian, 1 Czech and 1 Azeri. As such it was the most international unit that fought for the Polish anti-Nazi resistance and in the Warsaw Uprising.

== The Slovak platoon ==
The platoon was also unique among all the insurgent units during the uprising, in that it wore a different armband from all other AK soldiers (the armband was the distinguishing feature of the insurgents as it clearly marked them as combatants and thus served as a "uniform"). The usual AK armband was red and white, the colors of the Polish flag, occasionally with a Kotwica inscribed upon it. Platoon 535 however, wore red-white-blue armbands, in the national colors of Slovakia, with the number of the platoon and the Slovak coat of arms. The platoon also had its own standard, resembling the Slovak national flag, which was made by the Courier Janina Szczudłowska ("Santorek").

Formally, the right of the platoon to wear different "uniforms" (armbands) was set forth in a specific previous agreement between the Home Army command and Mirosław Iringh, and was meant to underlie the fact that while fighting alongside the Poles, and under the direction of the Home Army, the platoon was an autonomous, independent unit. Unfortunately, at the beginning of the uprising, not all local commanders were aware of the agreement and the different armbands caused some confusion. At one point, the soldiers of the platoon were mistaken for Frenchmen (the national colors of Slovakia and France are the same).

== Major engagements ==
Initially the platoon was assigned to the 2nd Region of the 5th Area "Mokotow" and was part of the company "Leugna" (named after the company commander). However, at "W hour" (the break out of the Warsaw Uprising) only a portion of the platoon managed to assemble for this action. On the first day of the Warsaw Uprising this part of the unit took part in the attack on Belweder Palace, after which, due to heavy casualties (out of twenty something soldiers, only seven survived), it was forced to retreat to the Chojnowski forest together with all other units of the 5th area. Other parts of the platoon, upon the initiation of the uprising found themselves in Old Town and in Śródmieście (City Center).

The largest portion of the platoon, under Iringh operated in the Czerniakow area, where their strength was supplemented with escaped Soviet POWs (mostly Georgians and Armenians). Initially Iringh did not trust them, but soon changed his mind as they proved themselves in battle. The last names of these soldiers are known from Home Army records: Tamaradze, Bibilaszwili, Nazarow, Gasparian, Galustjan, Alchazaszwili. It is known, according to the nurse of the platoon, that Tamaradze died while single-handedly defending a position against attacking Germans on September 15. Some of these former Soviet POWs survived the uprising, managed to cross the Vistula river and reached the inactive Soviet army on the other side, which was standing by as the Germans crushed the uprising. Their fates are unknown (the Soviets routinely executed or exiled their own soldiers who had been captured on the grounds of "treason", even if they had managed to escape from the German captivity), although Iringh, after the war made numerous efforts to find out their fates.

The platoon took part in heavy fighting in the Czerniakow suburb until September 23, 1944. After suffering heavy casualties, along with the entire Group "Kryska" it was incorporated into the Radosław Group, under the command of Jan Mazurkiewicz. Afterward the remainder of the platoon evacuated to the right bank of the Vistula on makeshift pantoons. Overall, in all of the fighting during the uprising, 75% of the platoon soldiers had been killed in action. Although Iringh was successfully evacuated, his wife Waleria had been trapped in a different part of Warsaw. They were reunited after the war.

Once the remainder of the platoon had made it to the zone controlled by the Red Army where they were quartered in an abandoned villa. According to one of the nurses of the platoon ("Aga") they were well treated and well fed but the building was surrounded by wire. Soon, Iringh arrived and told the nurses of the platoon to leave the place; apparently at this time the former Soviet POWs that were part of the platoon were "disappeared" and Iringh, wanted to make sure nothing happened to the nurses. One of the nurses made her way to her family in Lublin where eventually she found that Iringh had also made his way there and was in the hospital.

== Partial list of soldiers of the platoon ==
The names marked with a cross indicate those who were killed during the Warsaw Uprising. Not all pseudonyms and ranks are known.

- Pvt. Jurij Alhazaszwili †
- Pvt. Iwan Babilaszwili
- Pvt. Georgij Bubalaszwili (ps. "Grysza") †
- Pvt. W. Bajak † (ps. "New")
- Pvt. J. Bargar † (ps. "Sloboda")
- Pvt. Czesław Borkowski (ps. "Sokół")
- Pvt. G. Ćako † (ps. "Star")
- Sgt. Zenon Dąbrowski † (ps. "Żaba")
- Cpl. Edward Długosz † (ps. "Kaktus")
- Cpl. Rajmund Fiksiński (ps. "Szach")
- (rank unknown) Sasza Galustian
- Cpl. Michał Gasparian
- LSgt. Jan Kołdoński (ps. "Vis")
- Nurse Józefa Kotowska (ps. "Kama")
- Nurse Danuta Kozłowska (ps. "Aga")
- LSgt. NN † (ps. "Valdek")
- Pvt. Władysław Krzykowski † (ps. "Arab")
- 2Lt. Tadeusz Leider † (ps. "Lech")
- Sgt. Czesław Łabęda † (ps. "Jurek")
- 2Lt. Wacław Ławryniuk † (ps. "Wacek")
- LSgt. Czesław Matuszewski † (ps. Reflektor")
- Pvt. Stefan Naghy † (ps. "Madziar")
- Pvt. Edward Nalewajski † (ps. "Sokół")
- Pvt. Nazarow Michał
- Pvt. A. Omyčka †
- Pvt. Andrzej Orszagh † (ps. "Miecz")
- Pvt. Edward Sindakiewicz † (ps. "Kolejarz")
- Pvt. Stano Surik † (ps. Ruka")
- Pvt. Jerzy Suszjanszwili †
- LSgt. Hieronim Swaradzki (ps. "Kogut")
- An officer of the Red Army Józef Tamaradze †
- Nurse Halina Wojtyś (ps. "Ryta")
- Pvt. Mieczysław Zakrzewski † (ps. "Bomba")
- Courier Barbara Zamełłka (ps. "Pagoda")
- Pvt. Zelimir Zawadzki † (ps. "Hermes")
