= Ogakie Station =

Railway station in Chiryū, Aichi Prefecture, Japan

Ogakie Station 小垣江駅

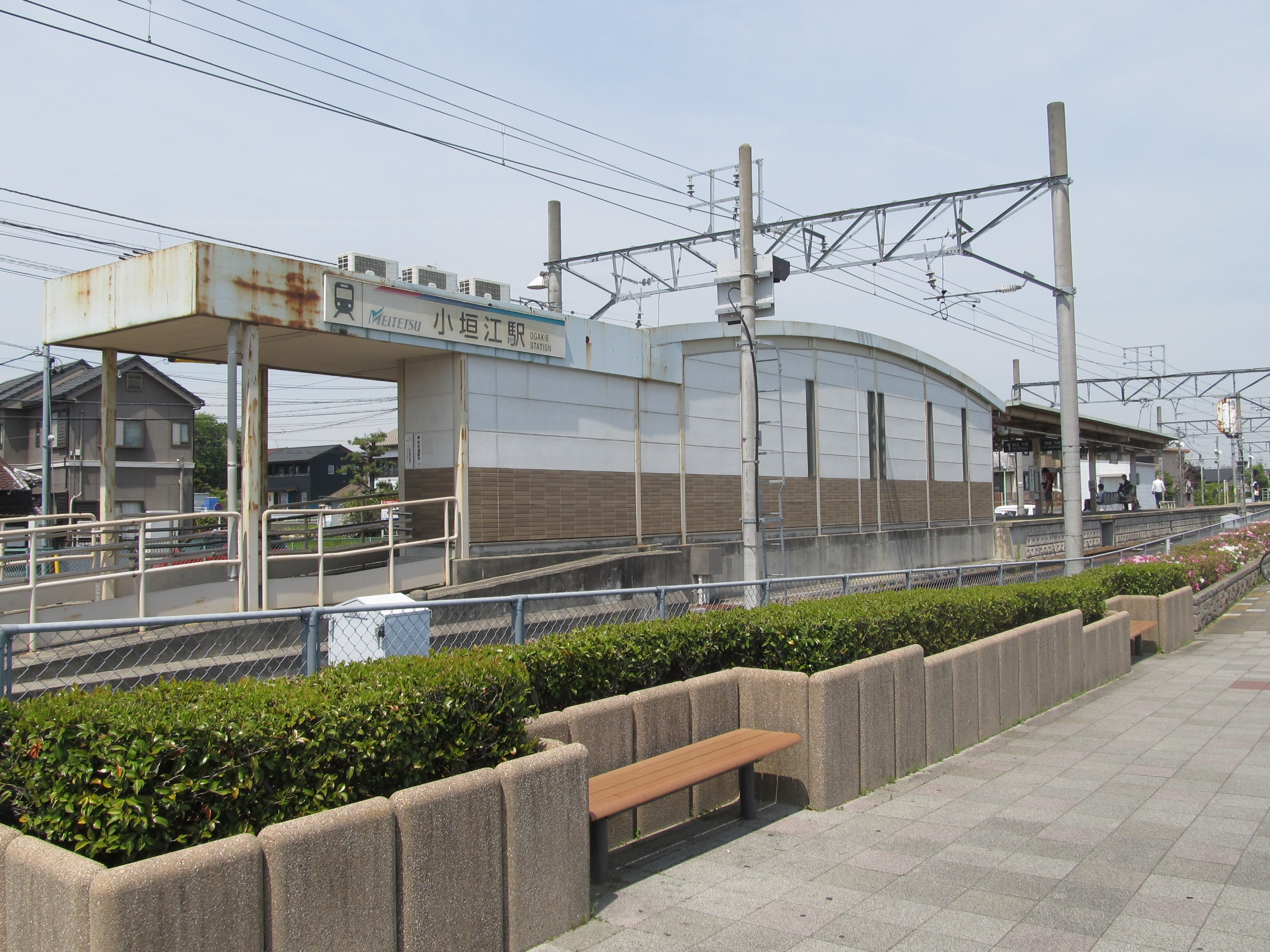
- Ogakie Station in April 2018

General information
- Location: Shimohannoki-20 Ogakiechō, Kariya-shi, Aichi-ken 448-0813; Japan
- Coordinates: 34.9638°N 136.9955°E
- Operator: Meitetsu
- Line: ■ Meitetsu Mikawa Line
- Distance: 29.4 kilometers from Sanage
- Platforms: 1 island platform

Other information
- Status: Unstaffed
- Station code: MU04
- Website: Official website

History
- Opened: February 5, 1914

Passengers
- FY2017: 3604

Services
Preceding station	Meitetsu	Following station
Kariyashi towards Chiryū	Mikawa Line Chiryū–Hekinan	Yoshihama towards Hekinan
Location
- Location within Aichi Prefecture Location within Japan

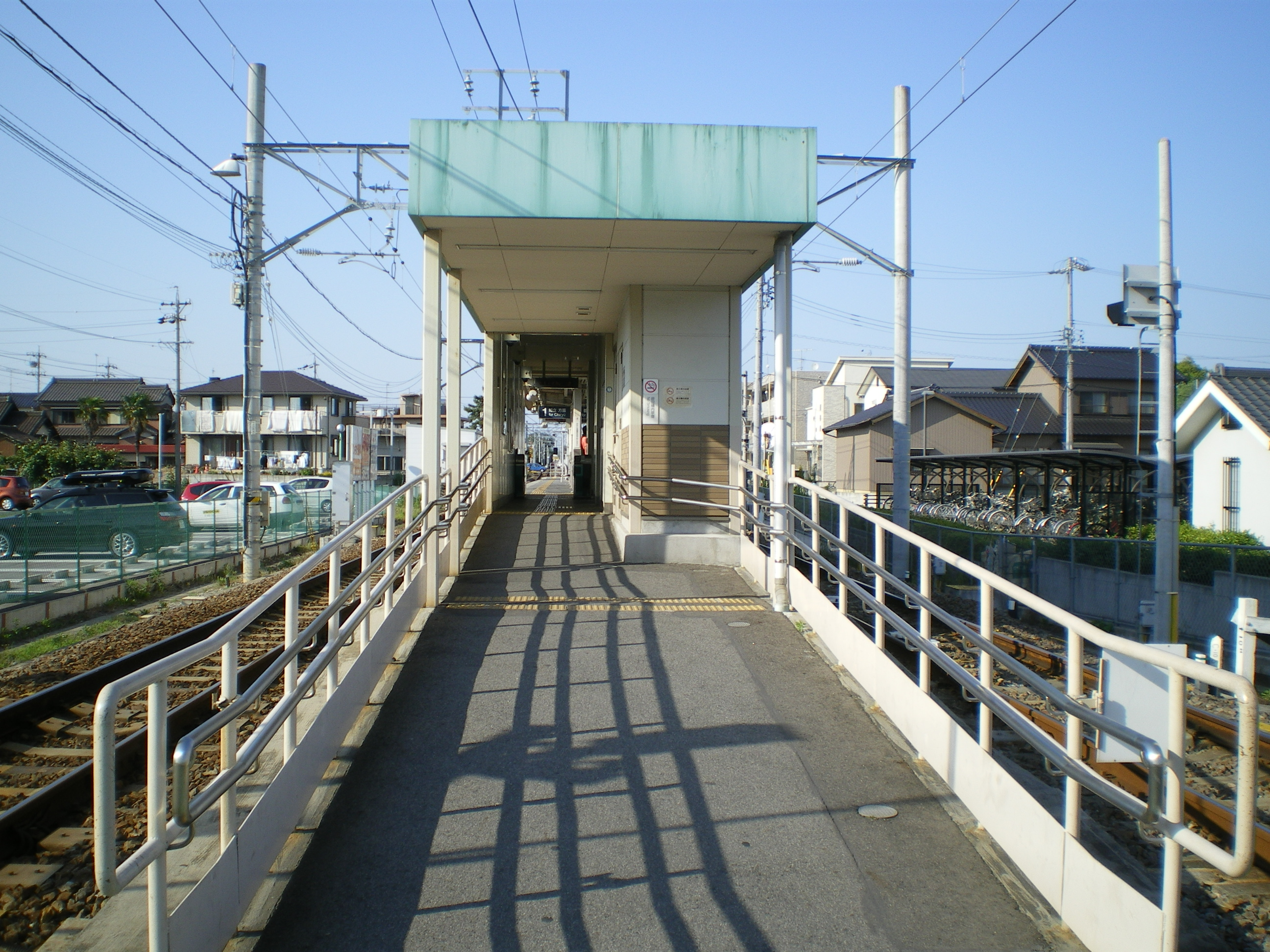
Platform

Ogakie Station (小垣江駅, Ogakie-eki) is a railway station in the city of Kariya, Aichi Prefecture, Japan, operated by Meitetsu.

== Lines ==
Ogakie Station is served by the Meitetsu Mikawa Line, and is located 29.7 km (18.5 mi) from the starting point of the line at Sanage and 5.5 km (3.4 mi) from Chiryū.

== Station layout ==
The station has a single island platform connected to the road by a level crossing. The station has automatic turnstiles for the Tranpass system of magnetic fare cards, and is unattended.

=== Platforms ===
1	■ Mikawa Line	For Kariya and Chiryū
2	■ Mikawa Line	For Mikawa Takahama and Hekinan

== Station history ==
Ogakie Station was opened on February 5, 1914, as a station on the privately owned Mikawa Railway Company. The Mikawa Railway Company was taken over by Meitetsu on June 1, 1941. The station has been unattended since 2005.

== Passenger statistics ==
In fiscal 2017, the station was used by an average of 3604 passengers daily.

== Surrounding area ==
- Ogakie Elementary School

== See also ==
- List of railway stations in Japan
