= Kariyashi Station =

Railway station in Kariya, Aichi Prefecture, Japan

Kariyashi Station 刈谷市駅

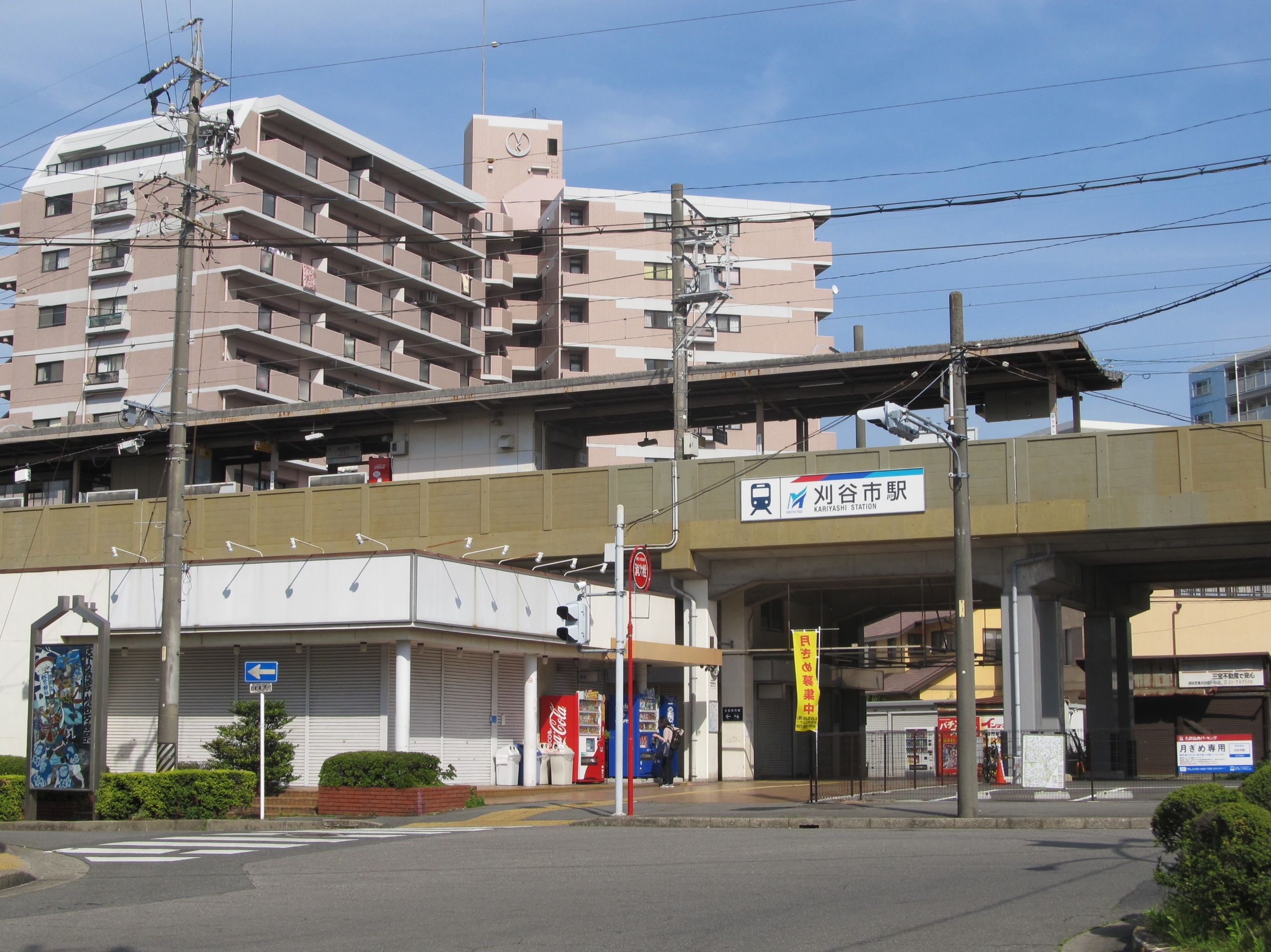
- Kariyashi Station in February 2018

General information
- Location: 3-504 Hirokōji, Kariya-shi, Aichi-ken 448-0844; Japan
- Coordinates: 34.9846°N 136.9938°E
- Operator: Meitetsu
- Line: ■ Meitetsu Mikawa Line
- Distance: 29.4 kilometers from Sanage
- Platforms: 1 island platform

Other information
- Status: Unstaffed
- Station code: MU03
- Website: Official website

History
- Opened: February 5, 1914
- Former names: Kariyamachi (to 1952)

Passengers
- FY2017: 6602

Services
Preceding station	Meitetsu	Following station
Kariya towards Chiryū	Mikawa Line Chiryū–Hekinan	Ogakie towards Hekinan
Location
- Location within Aichi Prefecture Location within Japan

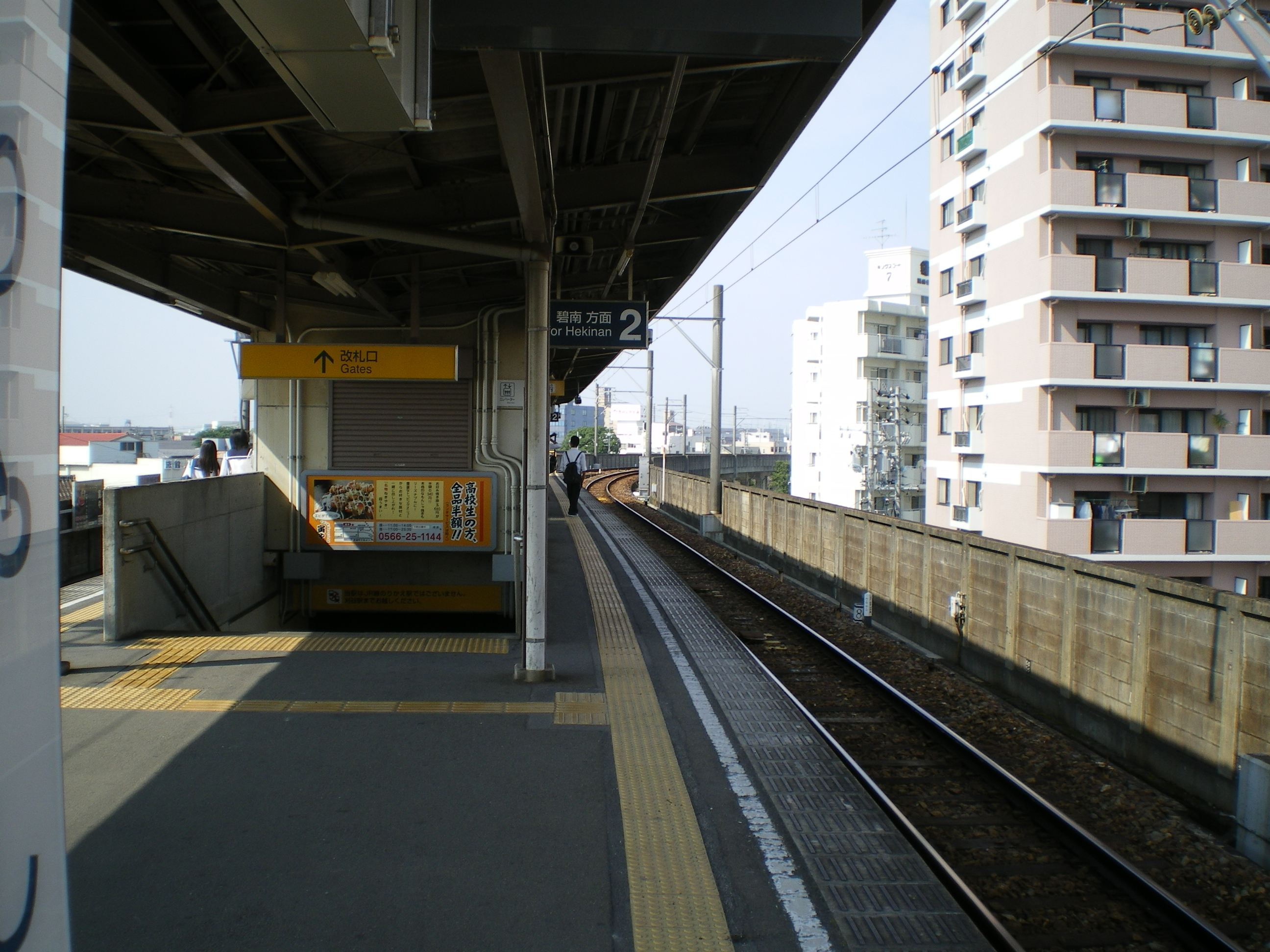
Platform

Kariyashi Station (刈谷市駅, Kariyashi-eki) is a railway station in the city of Kariya, Aichi Prefecture, Japan, operated by Meitetsu.

== Lines ==
Kariyashi Station is served by the Meitetsu Mikawa Line and is located 26.8 km (16.7 mi) from the starting point of the line at Sanage and 5.5 km (3.4 mi) from Chiryū.

== Station layout ==
The station has a single elevated island platform, with the station building located underneath. The station has automatic turnstiles for the Tranpass system of magnetic fare cards and is unattended.

=== Platforms ===
1	■ Mikawa Line	For Chiryū
2	■ Mikawa Line	For Mikawa Takahama and Hekinan

== Station history ==
Kariyashi Station was opened on February 5, 1914, as a Kariyamachi Station (刈谷町駅, Kariyamachi-eki) on the privately owned Mikawa Railway Company. The Mikawa Railway Company was taken over by Meitetsu on June 1, 1941. The station was renamed to its present name on March 1, 1952. The tracks were elevated and the station building rebuilt in 1980.

== Passenger statistics ==
In fiscal 2017, the station was used by an average of 6602 passengers daily.

== Surrounding area ==
- Kariya Castle
- Kariya High School

== See also ==
- List of railway stations in Japan
