= Kannonmachi Station =

Railway station in Eiheiji, Fukui Prefecture, Japan

Kannonmachi Station 観音町駅
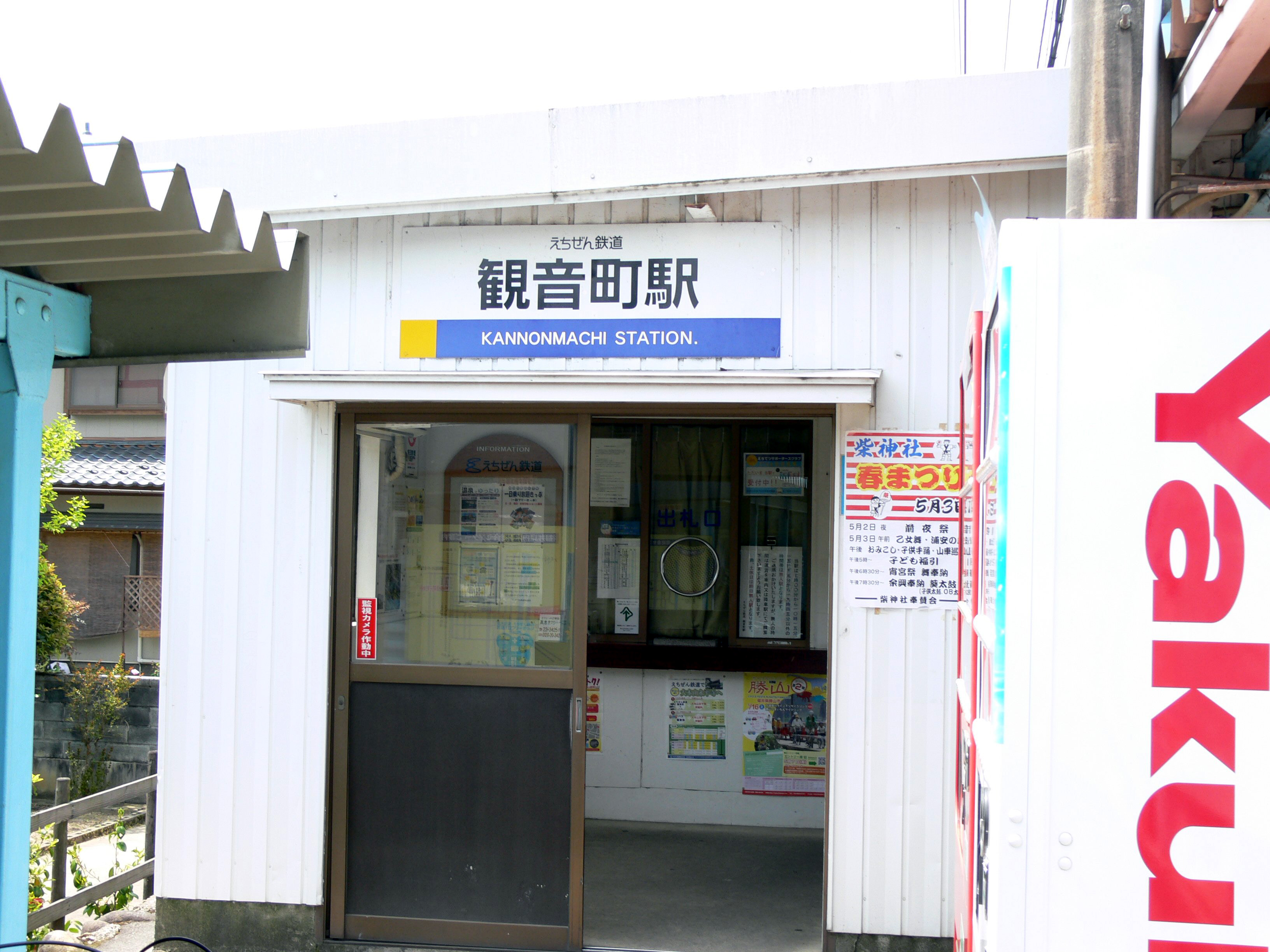
- Station building

General information
- Location: Matsuoka Shibahara 3-chome, Eiheiji, Fukui Prefecture; Japan
- Coordinates: 36°5′30.2″N 136°17′24″E
- System: Railway station
- Operator: Echizen Railway
- Line: Katsuyama Eiheiji Line
- Distance: 7.3 km (4.5 mi) from Fukui Station
- Platforms: 1 side platform
- Tracks: 1

Construction
- Structure type: At-grade

Other information
- Station code: E9

History
- Opened: March 11, 1914

Passengers
- 616 daily (2018)
Location

Kannonmachi Station (観音町駅, Kannonmachi-eki) is a railway station on the Katsuyama Eiheiji Line operated by Echizen Railway in Eiheiji, Fukui Prefecture, Japan. The station is numbered E9.

== History ==
- March 11, 1914: Opened as part of the Kyoto Electric Railway's Echizen Electric Railway line.
- March 2, 1942: Became part of Keifuku Electric Railway following the company's establishment.
- September 1, 1952: Ceased freight operations.
- June 1, 1961: Station operations were outsourced.
- June 24, 2001: Operations suspended due to the Keifuku Electric Railway Echizen Main Line accident.
- February 1, 2003: Echizen Railway acquired the station facilities from Keifuku Railway.
- July 20, 2003: Operations resumed as part of the Echizen Railway's Katsuyama Eiheiji Line.

== Station layout ==
The station consists of a single side platform serving one track. It is an at-grade station. Station staff are present only during weekday mornings and evenings.

Platform	Line	Direction	Destination
Side platform	Katsuyama Eiheiji Line	Down	Katsuyama
	Katsuyama Eiheiji Line	Up	Fukui

== Passenger statistics ==
In fiscal year 2018, the station was used by an average of 616 passengers daily.

== Surrounding area ==
- Sesshu-ji Temple, which features the "Kannon Hall" that inspired the station's name.
- National Route 416
- Hokuriku Electric Power Distribution Matsuoka Substation
- Fukui Inland Water Comprehensive Center
- Hokuriku Expressway Fukui Kita Junction and Chubu Jukan Expressway Matsuoka Interchange

== Adjacent stations ==
Line	Preceding station	Distance	Following station
Katsuyama Eiheiji Line	Echizen-Shimabashi Station (E8)	1.3 km (0.81 mi)	Matsuoka Station (E10)
