= Karl Ingold =

German aviator and bicycle racer

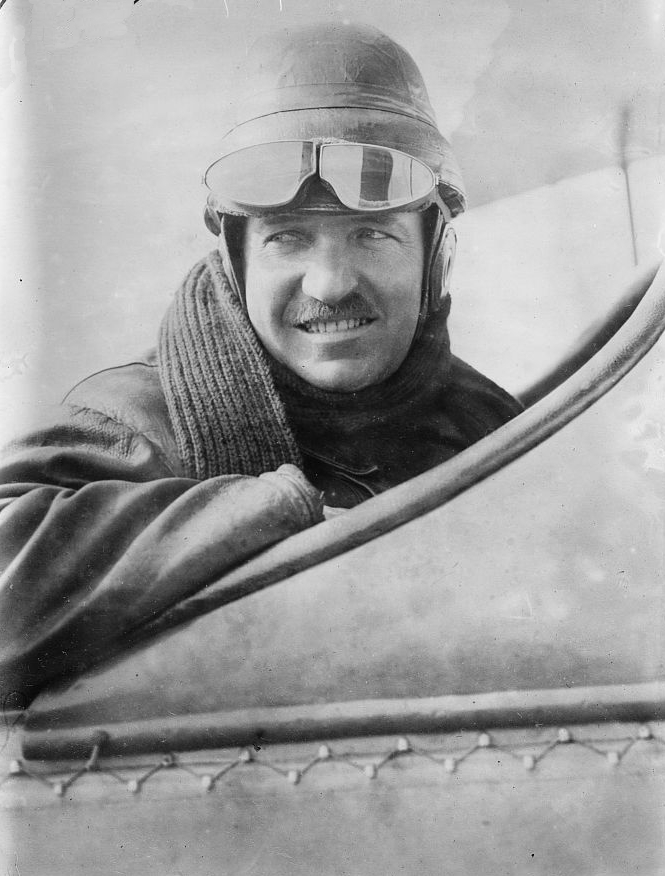
- Born: 1880
- Died: 1956 (aged 75–76)

Karl Ingold was a record-setting pioneer aviator.

== Biography ==
Ingold was born in 1880.

On 7 February 1914, he flew continuously from 7:35 am until 11:55 pm covering 1,056 miles in 16 hours and 20 minutes, besting the previous nonstop record set three days before by Bruno Langer.

== See also ==
- Flight distance record
