= Mirosław Iringh =

Slovak publicist and soldier (1914–1985)

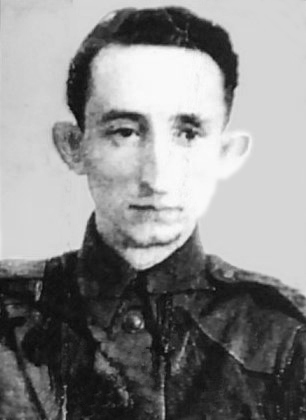
- Mirosław Iringh
- Born: 28 February 1914; Warsaw, Congress Poland
- Died: 28 May 1985 (aged 71); Warsaw, Poland
- Military career
- Service years: 1939–1944
- Rank: Lieutenant
- Nickname: Stanko
- Unit: 535th Slovak Platoon
- Conflicts: Warsaw Uprising
- Awards: Order of Ľudovít Štúr
- Other work: Journalist, photographer

Mirosław "Stanko" Iringh (28 February 1914 – 28 May 1985) was a Polish-Slovak lieutenant and a commander of the 535th Slovak Platoon unit, serving under the command of the Polish Home Army (AK), part of the 1st Company of the Battalion "Tur", "Kryska" Group, Mokotów region, which took part in the Warsaw Uprising, in particular in the heavy fighting in Czerniaków and in Praga.

== Background ==
Mirosław Iringh was born on 28 February 1914 in Warsaw. He came from a mixed Polish-Slovak family. His father moved to Warsaw from Slovakia, supposedly because of "political reasons" (at the time Slovakia was part of Austria-Hungary) and married a Polish woman, Helena Perzanowska.

== September campaign ==
In September 1939, after the Nazi invasion of Poland, together with his father Stanisław, he took part in the defense of Warsaw in the ranks of the Czech and Slovak Volunteer Legion. After his father died in this battle, Mirosław took the conspiratorial name "Stanko" in honor of his father.

== Joining the resistance ==
At the beginning of 1943, together with Adam Chalupec, Mirosław Iringh organized the "Underground Slovak National Committee" (SKN), which made contact with the representatives of the Home Army, and established civilian and military relations.< At the end of 1943 an agreement was reached between the SKN and the Home Army command, which called for the formation of a separate Slovak military unit within the structure of the Home Army – Platoon 535. The unit was to be distinguished by armbands and a regimental standard in Slovak national colors, white-blue-red, as opposed to the red and white colors of the rest of the Home Army soldiers. Iringh's armband was made by the wife of one of the Polish members of SKN, Jadwiga Szantarek-Szczudłowska. She sewed it out of a French broad riband military decoration which had been bestowed on her husband (Col. Mieczysław Szczudłowski) by Marshal Foch – the colors of the French flag are the same as that of the Slovak one. Because of the similarity in colors, during the Warsaw Uprising, the civilians of Warsaw sometimes mistook the Slovak partisans for Frenchmen.

During the Nazi occupation Iringh held a Slovak passport which allowed him certain "privileges" unavailable to Poles, which he used for anti-Nazi underground activity. For example, he was allowed to own a radio (ownership of these by Poles was illegal) which he used to monitor Allied news reports from the West which he then used as basis for articles in the underground newspapers. The Slovak passport also saved him from being taken in so called Łapankas (street round up), which made him a natural choice for a smuggler and distributor of the Bibula (Polish underground press). According to the memoirs of his wife, Waleria (who was also active in the underground) on one occasion the Łapanka took place on a tram, while Iringh was carrying a brief case full of illegal newspapers. Iringh approached the German policeman in charge and stated that he was a foreigner and in turn he was asked for his documents. Mirosław handed the suitcase full of illegal contraband to the policeman and calmly looked for his passport. Once he had produced it, the suitcase was handed back and he was free to leave. Iringh also prepared anti-Nazi pamphlets in Slovak which were distributed to the Slovak communities in Warsaw and Lwów, as well as to Hungarian soldiers stationed in Warsaw, who although serving as allies of Germany were often quite sympathetic to the Polish resistance (and many of whom were of Slovak background).

Iringh was also a photographer of the fighting and civilian everyday life during the insurrection. Many of his photographs are part of the collection of the National Library of Poland. Before the war, Iringh was a journalist, a profession which he tried to resume after the war. He wrote for the newspapers Život (the newspaper of the Slovak Community in Poland, which Iringh helped to organize), Gazeta Lubelska, and Życie Warszawy.

== Warsaw Uprising and 535th Slovak Platoon ==
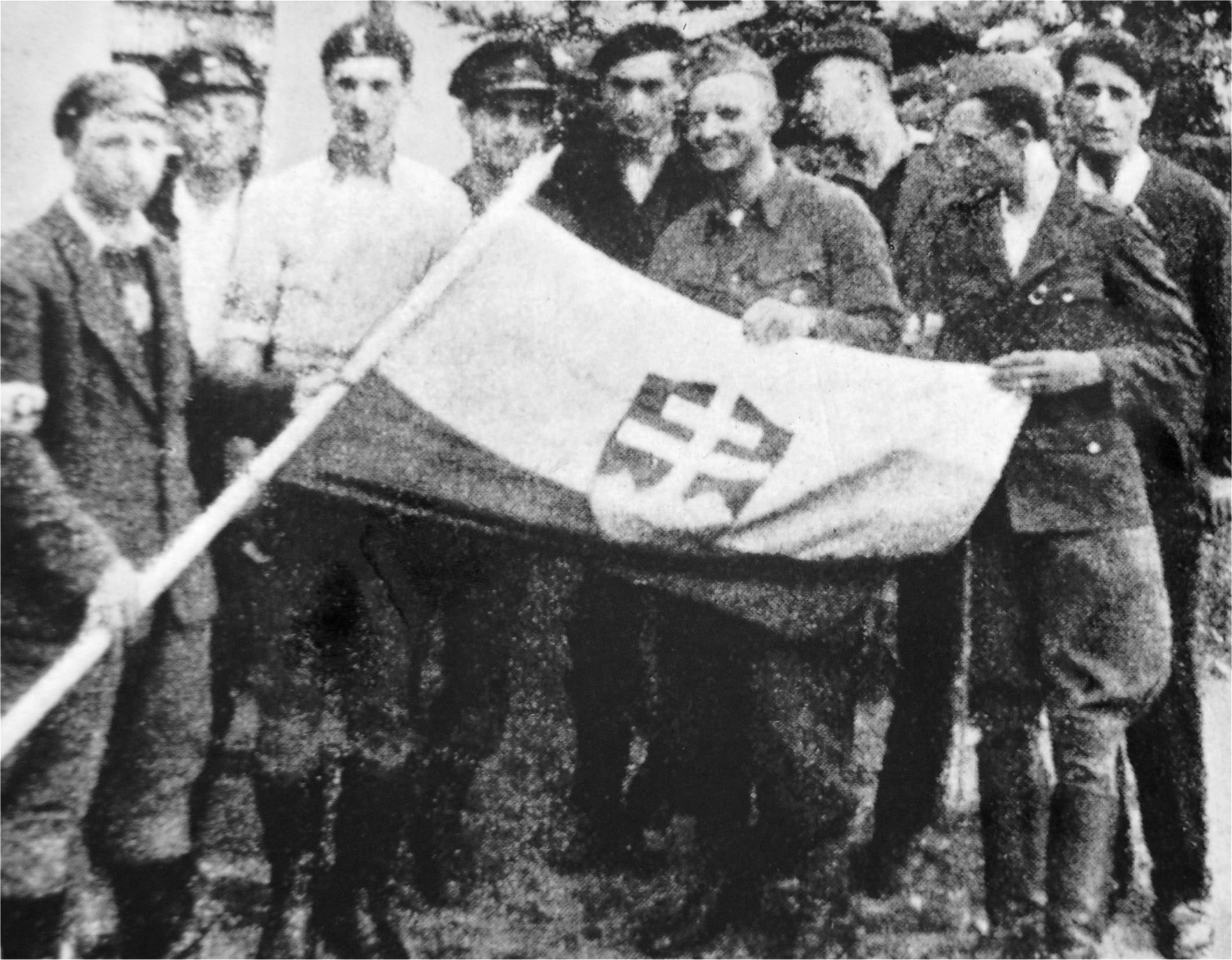
The "Slovak Platoon" in 1944 (photo by Maria Budzanowska). Note the Slovak flag and armbands.

During the Warsaw Uprising Mirosław led his platoon in heavy fighting in the Czerniaków district (although some soldiers of the platoon got trapped in other parts of Warsaw and were unable to join the main group – instead they fought independently in Praga). Iringh's unit was strengthened by a number of foreign, non-Slovak, soldiers who were present in Warsaw and who also wanted to fight the Germans, and additionally by several escaped Soviet POWs. According to the memoirs of former platoon members, Iringh was a commander noted for his frankness and directness, he always looked serious and never made jokes, which enabled him to enforce strict discipline in his unit. At the same time he cared greatly for his soldiers, took part in direct fighting himself, even though at the time he was sick with pneumonia. One of the AK nurses assigned to his unit, Danuta Pietraszak (now Michałowska) remembers him as "Emaciated, in a hard hat instead of a helmet, always with a cigarette, constantly coughing. He was in control of everyone, even our Georgians" (the last being a reference to the escaped Soviet POWs who were part of the unit).

== After the war ==
He was persecuted by communist authorities for having been a member of the AK and was refused employment for many years. Initially he worked as a freelance writer for various newspapers. However, in 1951 he lost his job due to his past membership in the Home Army. His wife was given a choice of either divorcing him, or also losing her job. She refused, and they both became unemployed. As a result, Iringh tried to support his family, even though by this time he was quite ill, by taking photographs and selling them on the street to passers-by. In 1956 he started to work for the Association of Czechs and Slovaks in Poland although he was soon once again fired on the basis of an absurd accusation that he was plotting to separate the Orava and Polish Spisz regions from Poland and join them to Czechoslovakia.

He died of lung cancer in 1985 and is buried in Warsaw's Powązki Cemetery.

== Legacy ==
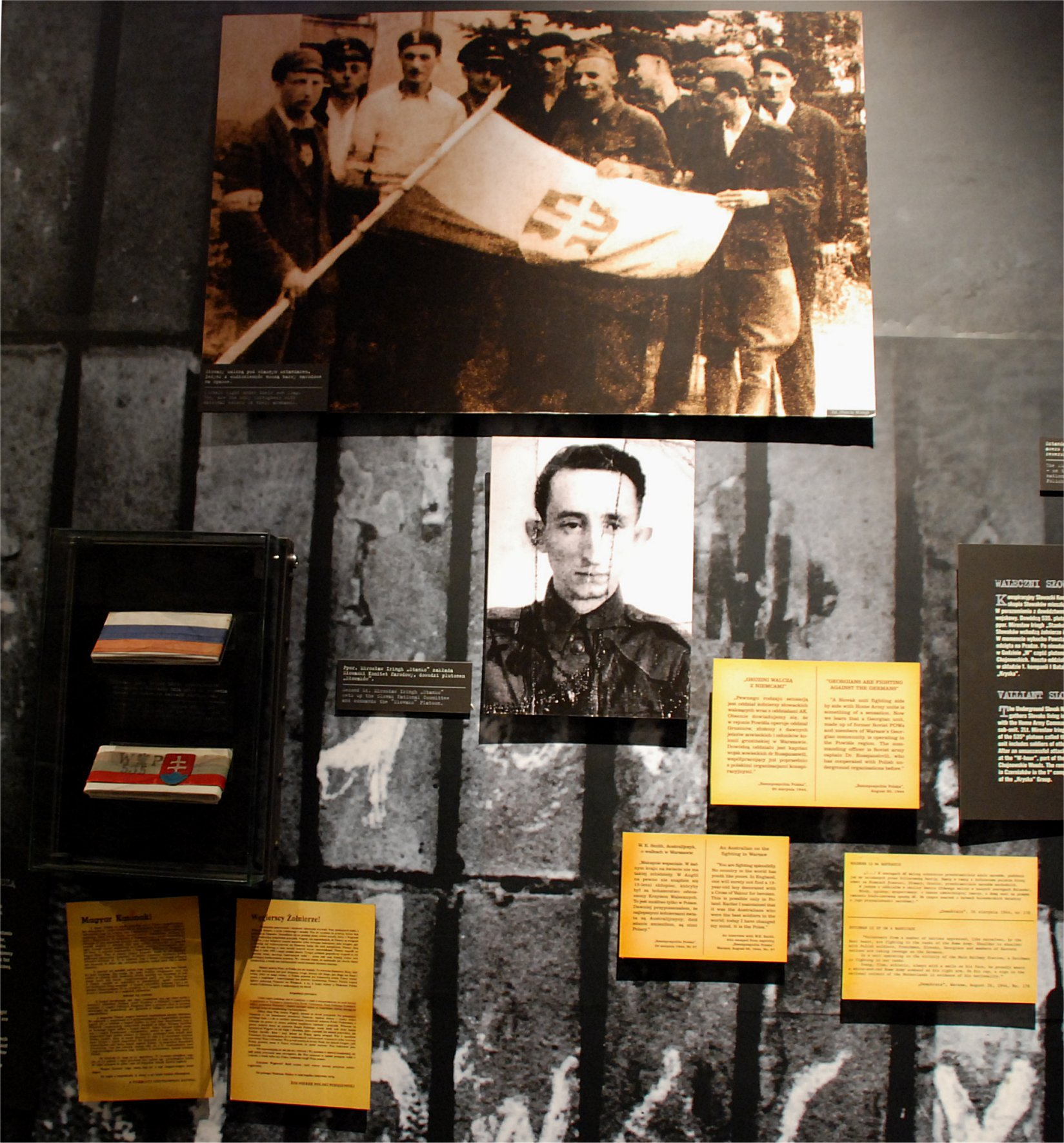
Portion of the exhibit dedicated to Platoon 535 led by Mirosław Iringh at the Warsaw Uprising Museum

In June 2005, Mirosław Iringh's daughters transferred a collection of memorabilia about Iringh and Platoon 535 to the Warsaw Uprising Museum in Warsaw where they are currently on display. On 31 August 2007 Iringh's daughter, Bogusława Iringh–Nagórska, accepted in her father's name the decoration of the Order of Order of Ľudovít Štúr, 2nd Class, bestowed upon him posthumously by the President of Slovakia Ivan Gašparovič.

For his wartime achievements, he also received the following medals: Warsaw Cross of the Uprising, Partisan Cross, Armia Krajowa Cross, Cross of Valor (four times), Cross of Merit (twice), Order of Polonia Restituta (Officer's Cross), and Virtuti Militari (V class).

One of the squares in the Czerniaków part of Warsaw, where his unit engaged in heavy fighting with the Germans is named after him.
