= Matsuoka Station =

Railway station in Eiheiji, Fukui Prefecture, Japan

Matsuoka Station 松岡駅
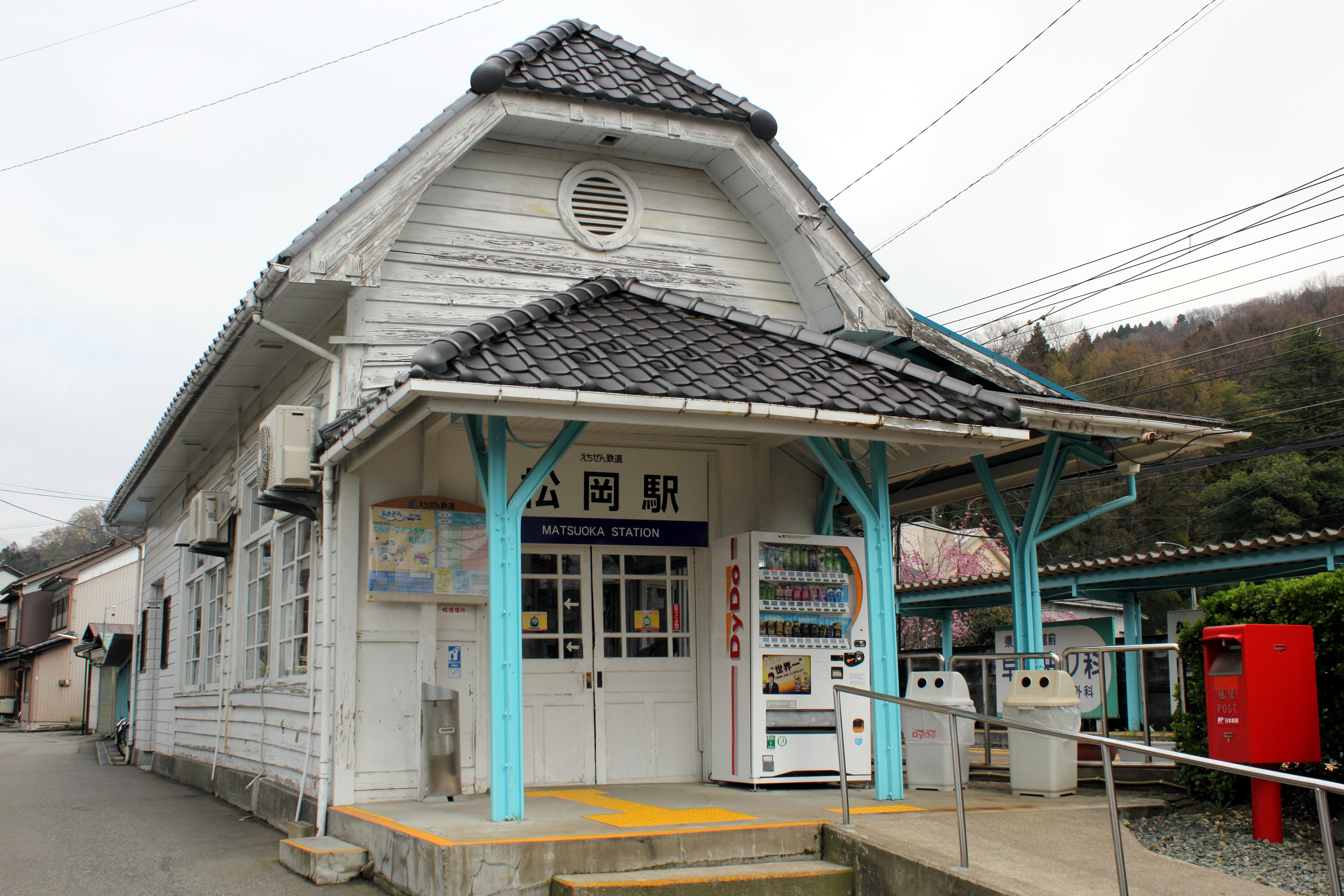
- Matsuoka Station in April 2015

General information
- Location: 1 Matsuoka-Shinmei, Eiheiji-machi, Yoshida-gun, Fukui-ken 910-1117; Japan
- Coordinates: 36°05′38″N 136°18′07″E
- Operator: Echizen Railway
- Line: ■ Katsuyama Eiheiji Line
- Distance: 8.4 km from Fukui
- Platforms: 2 side platforms
- Tracks: 2

Other information
- Status: Staffed
- Station code: E10
- Website: Official website

History
- Opened: February 11, 1914
Location
- Location within Japan

Matsuoka Station (松岡駅, Matsuoka-eki) is an Echizen Railway Katsuyama Eiheiji Line railway station located in the town of Eiheiji, Yoshida District, Fukui Prefecture, Japan.

== Lines ==
Matsuoka Station is served by the Katsuyama Eiheiji Line, and is located 8.4 kilometers from the terminus of the line at Fukui.

== Station layout ==
The station consists of two opposed side platforms connected by a level crossing. The station is staffed. The wooden station building is protected by the government as a Registered Tangible Cultural Property.

== Adjacent stations ==
«	Service	»
Katsuyama Eiheiji Line
Kannonmachi	Express	Eiheijiguchi (in direction of Fukui only)
Kannonmachi	Local	Shiizakai

== History ==
Matsuoka Station was opened on February 11, 1914. Operations were halted from June 25, 2001. The station reopened on July 20, 2003 as an Echizen Railway station.

== Surrounding area ==
- The station is in the midst of a residential and commercial area on the edge of Eiheiji Town's central area.
- Eiheiji Town Hall is a short distance west of the station.
- National Route 416 passes to the south.

== See also ==
- List of railway stations in Japan
