= Sopwith Sociable =

Sociable

General information
- Type: Two-seat tractor biplane
- National origin: United Kingdom
- Manufacturer: Sopwith Aviation Company
- Primary user: Royal Naval Air Service
- Number built: 1

History
- Introduction date: 1914
- First flight: 17 February 1914
- Retired: 1914

The Sopwith Sociable (or sometimes Churchill or Tweenie) was a British single-engined two-seat tractor configuration biplane designed and built by Sopwith for the Royal Naval Air Service.

== Design and development ==
The Sociable, so called because the crew were seated side-by side rather than in tandem, was ordered by the British Admiralty for use as a training aircraft by the Royal Naval Air Service. It was two-bay biplane powered by a 100 hp (75 kW) Gnome Monosoupape radial. The Sociable was given serial number 149 by the Admiralty and first flew from Brooklands on 17 February 1914.

== Operational history ==
Two days after its first flight, the Sociable was delivered to Hendon on 19 February 1914. The next day the First Lord of the Admiralty Winston Churchill flew in it as a passenger; it afterwards gained the nickname the "Sopwith Churchill". It was based at Eastchurch when on 25 March 1914 it spun into the ground on take-off.

Repaired by Sopwith it was delivered to No. 3 Squadron RNAS in Belgium in September 1914. It was fitted with an additional fuel tank and a bomb rack and was used on an abortive attempt to bomb a German airship shed at Cologne on 22 September 1914. It was transferred to No. 1 Squadron RNAS but broke an axle on take-off from Antwerp, damaging the landing gear and badly damaging the upper wing. While awaiting repair at Antwerp it was abandoned following the advance of German troops.

== Operators ==
United Kingdom

- Royal Naval Air Service

== Specifications ==
Data from Sopwith - The Man and His Aircraft

General characteristics

- Crew: 2
- Length: 24 ft 3 in (7.39 m)
- Wingspan: 36 ft 0 in (10.97 m)
- Height: 9 ft 0 in (2.74 m)
- Empty weight: 960 lb (435 kg)
- Gross weight: 1,640 lb (744 kg)
- Fuel capacity: 25 imp gal (110 L)
- Powerplant: 1 × Gnome Monosoupape rotary engine, 100 hp (75 kW)
- Propellers: 2-bladed, 8 ft 6 in (2.59 m) diameter

Performance

- Maximum speed: 90 mph (140 km/h, 78 kn)
- Endurance: 3 hr

== See also ==
Related lists

- List of aircraft of the Royal Naval Air Service
