= Yoshihama Station (Aichi) =

Railway station in Takahama, Aichi Prefecture, Japan

Yoshihama Station 吉浜駅

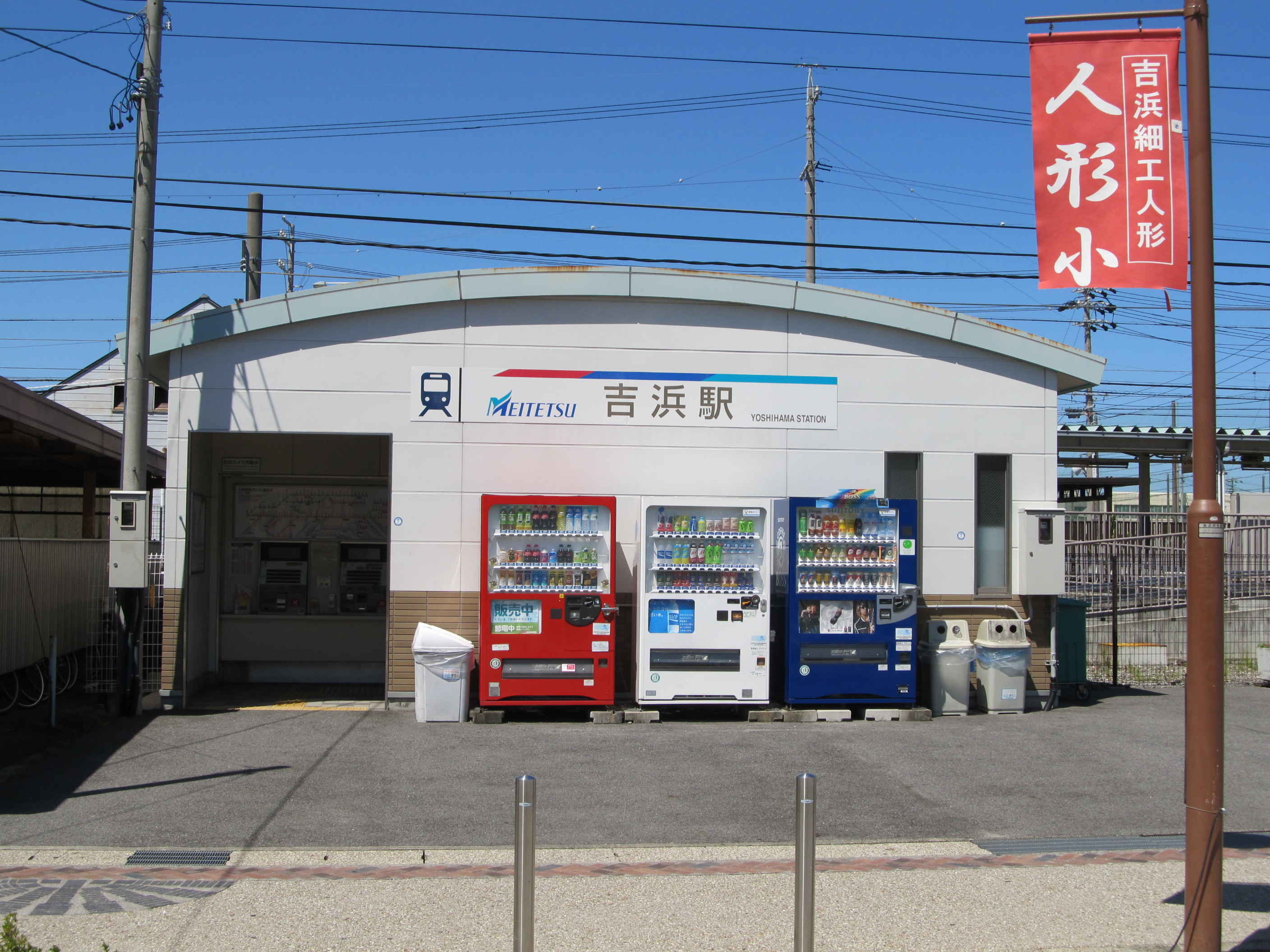
- Yoshihama Station

General information
- Location: 1-2-30 Yashikichō, Takahama-shi, Aichi-kan 444-1331; Japan
- Coordinates: 34.9466°N 136.989°E
- Operator: Meitetsu
- Line: ■ Meitetsu Toyota Line
- Distance: 34.1 kilometers from Sanage
- Platforms: 1 side platform

Other information
- Status: Unstaffed
- Station code: MU05
- Website: Official website

History
- Opened: February 5, 1914

Passengers
- FY2017: 2997

Services
| Preceding station | Meitetsu | Following station |
|---|---|---|
| Ogakie towards Chiryū | Mikawa Line Chiryū–Hekinan | Mikawa Takahama towards Hekinan |
Location
- Location within Aichi Prefecture Location within Japan

Yoshihama Station (吉浜駅, Yoshihama-eki) is a train station in the city of Takahama, Aichi Prefecture, Japan, operated by Meitetsu.

== Lines ==
Yoshihama Station is served by the Meitetsu Mikawa Line, and is located 10.1 km (6.3 mi) from the starting point of the line at Chiryu and 34.1 km (21.2 mi) from Sanage.

== Station layout ==
The station has one side platform serving a single bi-directional track. The station has automated ticket machines, Manaca automated turnstiles and is unattended.

== Station history ==
Yoshihama Station was opened on February 5, 1914, as a station on the privately owned Mikawa Railway Company. The Mikawa Railway Company was taken over by Meitetsu on June 1, 1941.

== Passenger statistics ==
In fiscal 2017, the station was used by an average of 2,997 passengers daily.

== Surrounding area ==
- Yoshihama Post Office

== See also ==
- List of railway stations in Japan
